= 1994–95 AFC Ajax season =

Dutch football club season

Ajax
1994–95 season
- Manager: Louis van Gaal
- Stadium: Olympic Stadium; De Meer Stadion
- Eredivisie: 1st
- Johan Cruijff Shield: Winners
- KNVB Cup: Quarter-finals
- Champions League: Winners
- Top goalscorer: League: Patrick Kluivert (18); All: Jari Litmanen (27)
- Highest home attendance: 42,000
- Average home league attendance: 23,587
Home colours	Away colours

During the 1994–95 Dutch football season, Ajax competed in the Eredivisie. Ajax won a league-cup double. They won their 25th Dutch title in style, not losing a single match all season and scoring 106 goals. Ajax also won their fourth European Cup, defeating A.C. Milan 1–0 in the final. This Ajax squad is considered to be one of the best teams in football history.

== Overview ==
Competition	Record								Result	Top scorer
Competition	G	W	D	L	GF	GA	GD	Win %	Result	Top scorer
Eredivisie	34	27	7	0	106	28	+78	79.41	Winners	(Netherlands) Patrick Kluivert, 18
KNVB Cup	3	2	0	1	7	3	+4	66.67	Quarter-finals	(Netherlands) Ronald de Boer, 4
Dutch Supercup	1	1	0	0	3	0	+3	100.00	Winners	3 players, 1
UEFA Champions League	11	7	4	0	18	4	+14	63.64	Winners	(Finland) Jari Litmanen, 6
Total	49	37	11	1	134	35	+99	75.51		(Finland) Jari Litmanen, 25

== Players ==
=== First-team squad ===
Note: Flags indicate national team as defined under FIFA eligibility rules; some limited exceptions apply. Players may hold more than one non-FIFA nationality.

No.	Pos.	Nation	Player
12	GK	NED	Fred Grim
1	GK	NED	Edwin van der Sar
3	DF	NED	Danny Blind (captain)
15	DF	NED	Winston Bogarde
5	DF	NED	Frank de Boer
2	DF	NED	Michael Reiziger
13	DF	NED	Sonny Silooy
6	MF	NED	Ronald de Boer
22	MF	NED	Edgar Davids
16	MF	NED	Kiki Musampa
—	MF	NED	Tarik Oulida

No.	Pos.	Nation	Player
23	MF	NED	Martijn Reuser
4	MF	NED	Frank Rijkaard
20	MF	NED	Clarence Seedorf
21	MF	NED	John van den Brom
19	MF	NED	Nordin Wooter
7	FW	NGA	Finidi George
10	FW	FIN	Jari Litmanen
11	FW	NED	Marc Overmars
4	FW	NGA	Nwankwo Kanu
9	FW	NED	Patrick Kluivert
11	FW	NED	Peter van Vossen
—	FW	NED	Clyde Wijnhard

=== Transfers ===
In
Pos.	Name	from	Type
DF	Michael Reiziger	Groningen	loan ended
DF	Winston Bogarde	Sparta Rotterdam	
GK	Fred Grim	Cambuur	
FW	Clyde Wijnhard	Groningen	loan ended

Out
Pos.	Name	To	Type
MF	Michel Kreek	Padova	
MF	Stefan Pettersson	IFK Göteborg	
GK	Stanley Menzo	PSV	
DF	Dan Petersen	OB	

== Results ==
Between 1994 and 1996, Ajax completed an unbeaten run of 52 domestic matches + 19 UEFA Champions League matches, while the 1995 year is considered as the peak of that. The 1995 Ajax team remained unbeaten for a full year, in Europe and in domestic league, a run of 48 matches overall. The feat of winning simultaneously both the Champions League and domestic league without a single defeat is a historical achievement unmatched by any other team.

== Competitions ==
=== Eredivisie ===
==== League table ====
Pos	Team	Pld	W	D	L	GF	GA	GD	Pts	Qualification or relegation
1	Ajax (C)	34	27	7	0	106	28	+78	61	Qualification to Champions League group stage
2	Roda JC	34	22	10	2	70	28	+42	54	Qualification to UEFA Cup first round
3	PSV	34	20	7	7	85	46	+39	47	Qualification to UEFA Cup first round
4	Feyenoord	34	19	5	10	66	56	+10	43 (Note: Winners KNVB Cup.)	Qualification to Cup Winners' Cup first round
5	FC Twente	34	17	8	9	66	50	+16	42	

Source: , RSSSF.com,
Rules for classification: 1) Points; 2) Head-to-head points; 3) Head-to-head goal difference; 4) Goal difference; 5) Goals scored; 6) Draw. (Note: Head-to-head record is used only after all the matches between the teams in question have been played).
(C) Champions

==== Matches ====
27 August 1994 1	Ajax	3–1	RKC Waalwijk	Amsterdam
	Kluivert 14'; Blind 38'; Wooter 64'		Decheiver 74'	Stadium: De Meer Stadion; Attendance: 17,200; Referee: René Temmink

10 September 1994 2	Ajax	5–0	Vitesse	Amsterdam
	F. de Boer 10'; Kluivert 29'; George 39'; Rijkaard 69' van Vossen 84'			Stadium: De Meer Stadion; Attendance: 19,200; Referee: Dick Jol

21 September 1994 3	Roda JC	1–1	Ajax	Kerkrade
	Huiberts 35'		Kluivert 51'	Stadium: Sportpark Kaalheide; Attendance: 13,000; Referee: Mario van der Ende

23 September 1994 4	Ajax	3–0	FC Dordrecht	Amsterdam
	Kluivert 4', 82'; Overmars 90'			Stadium: De Meer Stadion; Attendance: 19,738; Referee: Hugo Luyten

2 October 1994 5	Sparta Rotterdam	0–2	Ajax	Rotterdam
			R. de Boer 36'; George 57' (pen.)	Stadium: Het Kasteel; Attendance: 12,500; Referee: Jef van Vliet

16 October 1994 6	Ajax	4–0	Go Ahead Eagles	Amsterdam
	Overmars 48'; Blind 50'; Litmanen 59'; Kluivert 90' (pen.)			Stadium: Olympisch Stadion; Attendance: 24,543; Referee: Jan Wegereef

23 October 1994 7	PSV Eindhoven	1–4	Ajax	Eindhoven
	Nilis 74'		F. de Boer 7'; Davids 14'; Seedorf 16' van Vossen 56'	Stadium: Philips Stadion; Attendance: 27,000; Referee: Mario van der Ende

25 October 1994 8	Ajax	5–1	Heerenveen	Amsterdam
	Rijkaard 15'; Litmanen 25', 32'; Kluivert 70', 90'		Oosterveer 74'	Stadium: De Meer Stadion; Attendance: 19,474; Referee: Ab Schuurmans

6 November 1994 9	Willem II	1–4	Ajax	Tilburg
	van Gastel 59'		van Vossen 13'; Litmanen 18'; George 49'; Davids 80'	Stadium: Willem II Stadion; Attendance: 13,500; Referee: John Blankenstein

9 November 1994 10	Ajax	3–1	Groningen	Amsterdam
	Litmanen 79'; Kluivert 80', 90'		Beerens 2'	Stadium: De Meer Stadion; Attendance: 18,751; Referee: Dick Jol

20 November 1994 11	Utrecht	0–0	Ajax	Utrecht
				Stadium: Stadion Galgenwaard; Attendance: 14,000; Referee: Jaap Uilenberg

26 November 1994 12	Ajax	3–1	MVV	Amsterdam
	Litmanen 5'; Overmars 65', 66'		Visser 39'	Stadium: De Meer Stadion; Attendance: 19,501; Referee: Jef van Vliet

4 December 1994 13	Volendam	2–2	Ajax	Volendam
	Smeets 4'; Ooijer 34'		Kanu 1'; Seedorf 3'	Stadium: Kras Stadion; Attendance: 8,100; Referee: René Temmink

17 December 1994 14	NAC Breda	2–2	Ajax	Breda
	Gerritsen 8'; Lammers 90'		Gaasbeek 23' (o.g.); R. de Boer 78'	Stadium: NAC Stadion; Attendance: 10,845; Referee: Roelof Luinge

20 December 1994 15	NEC	0–2	Ajax	Nijmegen
			van den Brom 16', 60'	Stadium: Goffertstadion; Attendance: 21,000; Referee: Herman van Dijk

13 January 1995 16	RKC	1–1	Ajax	Waalwijk
	van Rijswijk 7'		Kluivert 9'	Stadium: Sportpark Olympia; Attendance: 6,100; Referee: Jef van Vliet

21 January 1995 17	Ajax	1–0	PSV	Amsterdam
	Kluivert 80'			Stadium: Olympisch Stadion; Attendance: 40,000; Referee: Roelof Luinge

28 January 1995 18	Vitesse	2–3	Ajax	Arnhem
	Helder 29'; Cocu 51'		F. de Boer 30'; Kluivert 64' van den Brom 84'	Stadium: Nieuw Monnikenhuize; Attendance: 12,400; Referee: Jaap Uilenberg

4 February 1995 19	Ajax	3–1	NAC Breda	Amsterdam
	Kluivert 13', 24' van den Brom 34'		Remie 45'	Stadium: De Meer Stadion; Attendance: 19,400; Referee: Herman van Dijk

11 February 1995 20	Ajax	4–1	Feyenoord	Amsterdam
	George 34'; F. de Boer 49' van Vossen 57'; Blind 62'		Larsson 27'	Stadium: Olympisch Stadion; Attendance: 39,481; Referee: John Blankenstein

15 February 1995 21	Ajax	1–1	Roda JC	Amsterdam
	Kluivert 63'		Graef 38'	Stadium: De Meer Stadion; Attendance: 19,007; Referee: Jan Wegereef

19 February 1995 22	FC Dordrecht	1–3	Ajax	Dordrecht
	Koswal 13'		F. de Boer 35'; Overmars 41'; Kanu 85'	Stadium: Riwal Hoogwerkers Stadion; Attendance: 8,160; Referee: Hugo Luyten

11 March 1995 23	Go Ahead Eagles	1–2	Ajax	Deventer
	Schenning 49'		Litmanen 74'; Kanu 90'	Stadium: Adelaarshorst; Attendance: 10,000; Referee: Jan Wegereef

18 March 1995 24	Ajax	5–1	NEC	Amsterdam
	Litmanen 18', 22', 88'; Kanu 74'; Seedorf 78'		Pothuizen 55'	Stadium: De Meer Stadion; Attendance: 18,743; Referee: Roelof Luinge

21 March 1995 25	Ajax	8–0	Sparta Rotterdam	Amsterdam
	Seedorf 2'; Kanu 14'; F. de Boer 18', 30'; Litmanen 37', 47' van Eck 57' (o.g.); Blind 81'			Stadium: De Meer Stadion; Attendance: 18,741; Referee: René Temmink

26 March 1995 26	Twente	0–1	Ajax	Enschede
			Kanu 16'	Stadium: Diekman Stadion; Attendance: 13,500; Referee: Hans Reygwart

1 April 1995 27	Heerenveen	3–3	Ajax	Heerenveen
	Regtop 6'; Tomasson 12'; Alberda 52'		Litmanen 17', 44'; Kanu 72'	Stadium: Abe Lenstra Stadion; Attendance: 13,500; Referee: Jaap Uilenberg

8 April 1995 28	Ajax	7–0	Willem II	Amsterdam
	Litmanen 6', 21'; Kanu 8'; George 13'; Seedorf 24'; F. de Boer 75'; R. de Boer 77'			Stadium: De Meer Stadion; Attendance: 18,875; Referee: Wout Schaap

15 April 1995 29	Groningen	2–4	Ajax	Groningen
	Gorré 63'; Sion 76'		Kluivert 13', 39'; F. de Boer 22'; Overmars 70'	Stadium: Stadion Oosterpark; Attendance: 16,280; Referee: René Temmink

2 May 1995 30	MVV	0–3	Ajax	Maastricht
			George 35'; Overmars 58'; Davids 72'	Stadium: De Geusselt; Attendance: 11,000; Referee: John Blankenstein

10 May 1995 31	Ajax	2–1	Utrecht	Amsterdam
	Seedorf 69' van den Brom 75'		Gorter 19'	Stadium: Olympisch Stadion; Attendance: 27,310; Referee: Herman van Dijk

13 May 1995 32	Ajax	4–1	Volendam	Amsterdam
	F. de Boer 19'; Blind 48'; R. de Boer 67'; Litmanen 82'		Stefanović 27'	Stadium: Olympisch Stadion; Attendance: 42,000; Referee: Roelof Luinge

17 May 1995 33	Feyenoord	0–5	Ajax	Rotterdam
			Overmars 38'; Kanu 46', 76' (pen.); Davids 83' van Vossen 89'	Stadium: De Kuip; Attendance: 40,000; Referee: Dick Jol

27 May 1995 34	Ajax	3–1	Twente	Amsterdam
	George 12', 48'; Davids 79'		Bruggink 56'	Stadium: De Meer Stadion; Attendance: 19,231; Referee: Hugo Luyten

=== KNVB Cup ===
5 October 1994 First Round	Ajax	3–0	Den Bosch	Olympisch Stadion, Amsterdam
	Litmanen 52'; R. de Boer 84'; Davids 89'		Van Helmond 88'

30 November 1994 Second Round	NEC	0–3	Ajax	Goffertstadion, Nijmegen
			Kanu 30'; R. de Boer 69', 85'

8 March 1995 Quarter-finals	Ajax	1–2 (a.e.t.)	Feyenoord	Olympisch Stadion, Amsterdam
	R. de Boer 26'		Heus 79'; Obiku 95'

=== Dutch Supercup ===
21 August 1994	Ajax	3–0	Feyenoord	Olympisch Stadion, Amsterdam
	Litmanen 13'; Oulida 21'; Kluivert 25'			Attendance: 23,500; Referee: John Blankenstein (Den Haag)

=== UEFA Champions League ===
==== Group stage ====
Pos	Team	Pld	W	D	L	GF	GA	GD	Pts	Qualification	AJX	MIL	SAL	AEK
1	(Netherlands) Ajax	6	4	2	0	9	2	+7	10	Advance to knockout stage	—	2–0	1–1	2–0
2	(Italy) Milan	6	3	1	2	6	5	+1	5 (Note: Milan were docked two points for crowd trouble against Casino Salzburg on matchday 2. This occurred after Casino Salzburg goalkeeper Otto Konrad was hit on the head with a plastic bottle thrown from the stands, sustaining an injury for which he had to be substituted and taken to the hospital.)	Advance to knockout stage	0–2	—	3–0	2–1
3	(Austria) Casino Salzburg	6	1	3	2	4	6	−2	5		0–0	0–1	—	0–0
4	(Greece) AEK Athens	6	0	2	4	3	9	−6	2		1–2	0–0	1–3	—

Source: UEFA
Notes:

14 September 1994 1	Ajax (Netherlands)	2–0	(Italy) Milan	Amsterdam
20:30	R. de Boer 51'; Litmanen 65'	Report		Stadium: Olympisch Stadium; Attendance: 35,000; Referee: Antonio López Nieto (Spain)

28 September 1994 2	AEK Athens (Greece)	1–2	(Netherlands) Ajax	Nea Filadelfeia
21:30	Savevski 30'	Report	33' Litmanen; 59' Kluivert	Stadium: Nikos Goumas Stadium; Attendance: 24,747; Referee: Markus Merk (Germany)

19 October 1994 3	Casino Salzburg (Austria)	0–0	(Netherlands) Ajax	Vienna
20:30		Report		Stadium: Ernst-Happel-Stadion; Attendance: 19,500; Referee: Kurt Röthlisberger (Switzerland)

2 November 1994 4	Ajax (Netherlands)	1–1	(Austria) Casino Salzburg	Amsterdam
20:30	Litmanen 85'	Report	Kocijan 63'	Stadium: Olympisch Stadion; Attendance: 41,000; Referee: Les Mottram (Scotland)

23 November 1994 5	Milan (Italy)	0–2	(Netherlands) Ajax	Trieste
20:30		Report	2' Litmanen; 66' (o.g.)Baresi	Stadium: Stadio Nereo Rocco; Attendance: 29,764; Referee: Peter Mikkelsen (Denmark)

7 December 1994 6	Ajax (Netherlands)	2–0	(Greece) AEK Athens	Amsterdam
20:30	Oulida 7', 81'	Report		Stadium: Olympisch Stadion; Attendance: 39,138; Referee: Jorge Coroado (Portugal)

==== Knockout phase ====
===== Quarter-finals =====
1 March 1995 First Leg	Hajduk Split (Croatia)	0–0	(Netherlands) Ajax	Poljud, Split
19:00		Report		Attendance: 34,250; Referee: Ryszard Wójcik (Poland)

15 March 1995 Second Leg	Ajax (Netherlands)	3–0	(Croatia) Hajduk Split	Olympisch Stadion, Amsterdam
18:45	Kanu 39'; F. de Boer 43', 67'	Report		Attendance: 40,000; Referee: Ion Crăciunescu (Romania)

===== Semi-finals =====
5 April 1995 First Leg	Bayern Munich (Germany)	0–0	(Netherlands) Ajax	Olympiastadion, Munich
20:30		Report		Attendance: 60,000; Referee: Ahmet Çakar (Turkey)

19 April 1995 Second Leg	Ajax (Netherlands)	5–2	(Germany) Bayern Munich	Olympisch Stadion, Amsterdam
20:30	Litmanen 12', 46'; Finidi 41'; R. de Boer 44'; Overmars 88'	Report	Witeczek 36'; Scholl 75' (pen.)	Attendance: 42,000; Referee: Sándor Puhl (Hungary)

===== Final =====
24 May 1995	Ajax (Netherlands)	1–0	(Italy) Milan	Ernst Happel Stadion, Vienna
20:30	Kluivert 85'	Report		Attendance: 49,730; Referee: Ion Crăciunescu (Romania)

== Statistics ==
=== Appearances and goals ===
As of 27 May 1995

No.	Pos	Nat	Player	Total		Eredivisie		Cup		Champions League	
No.	Pos	Nat	Player	Apps	Goals	Apps	Goals	Apps	Goals	Apps	Goals
--	GK	(Netherlands) NED	van der Sar	47	0	33	0	3	0	11	0
--	DF	(Netherlands) NED	Reiziger	48	0	34	0	3	0	11	0
--	DF	(Netherlands) NED	Blind	46	5	34	5	2	0	10	0
--	DF	(Netherlands) NED	F. de Boer	47	11	34	9	3	0	10	2
--	MF	(Netherlands) NED	R. de Boer	38	11	24+1	5	3	4	10	2
--	MF	(Netherlands) NED	Rijkaard	38	2	26	2	2	0	10	0
--	MF	(Netherlands) NED	Davids	30	6	19+3	5	1	1	6+1	0
--	MF	(Netherlands) NED	Seedorf	48	6	29+5	6	3	0	10+1	0
--	FW	(Nigeria) NGA	Finidi George	43	9	30	8	3	0	10	1
--	FW	(Finland) FIN	Litmanen	41	24	26+1	17	3	1	11	6
--	FW	(Netherlands) NED	Overmars	42	9	23+5	8	3	0	10+1	1
--	GK	(Netherlands) NED	Grim	1	0	1	0	0	0	0	0
--	FW	(Netherlands) NED	Kluivert	35	20	16+9	18	0	0	5+5	2
--	FW	(Netherlands) NED	van Vossen	34	5	15+11	5	1	0	2+5	0
--	FW	(Nigeria) NGA	Kanu	26	12	11+7	10	1	1	3+4	1
--	MF	(Netherlands) NED	van den Brom	17	5	8+9	5	0	0	0	0
--	DF	(Netherlands) NED	Bogarde	19	0	7+7	0	1	0	1+3	0
--	MF	(Netherlands) NED	Oulida	4	2	2	0	0+1	0	1	2
--	MF	(Netherlands) NED	Wooter	5	1	1+4	1	0	0	0	0
--	MF	(Netherlands) NED	Reuser	2	0	1+1	0	0	0	0	0
--	DF	(Netherlands) NED	Silooy	1	0	0	0	1	0	0	0
--	MF	(Netherlands) NED	Musampa	1	0	0+1	0	0	0	0	0
--	DF	(Netherlands) NED	Kreek	3	0	0+1	0	0	0	0+2	0

== See also ==
- List of unbeaten football club seasons
