= 1994–95 AC Milan season =

Milan
1994–95 season
- President: Silvio Berlusconi
- Manager: Fabio Capello
- Stadium: San Siro
- Serie A: 4th (in UEFA Cup)
- Coppa Italia: Round of 16
- UEFA Champions League: Runners-up
- Supercoppa Italiana: Winners
- European Super Cup: Winners
- Intercontinental Cup: Runners-up
- Top goalscorer: League: Marco Simone (17); All: Marco Simone (21)
- Average home league attendance: 56,659
| Home colours | Away colours | Third colours |

Associazione Calcio Milan lost their supremacy of Italian football, finishing just fourth in Serie A, also losing the Champions League final to Ajax. Marco van Basten was forced to end his career due to an ankle injury, and the lack of goals scored was the main difference between Milan and champions Juventus, and even though Milan scored more goals than in 1993–94, the defensive line was not as unassailable as the season before.

== Squad ==
Note: Flags indicate national team as defined under FIFA eligibility rules; some limited exceptions apply. Players may hold more than one non-FIFA nationality.

| Pos. | Nation | Player |
|---|---|---|
| GK | ITA | Sebastiano Rossi |
| GK | ITA | Mario Ielpo |
| GK | ITA | Carlo Cudicini |
| DF | ITA | Christian Panucci |
| DF | ITA | Mauro Tassotti |
| DF | ITA | Franco Baresi |
| DF | ITA | Alessandro Costacurta |
| DF | ITA | Filippo Galli |
| DF | ITA | Stefano Nava |
| DF | ITA | Paolo Maldini |
| MF | ITA | Roberto Donadoni |
| MF | ITA | Stefano Eranio |
| MF | ITA | Demetrio Albertini |

| Pos. | Nation | Player |
|---|---|---|
| MF | FRA | Marcel Desailly |
| MF | ITA | Massimo Orlando |
| MF | ITA | Gianluca Sordo |
| MF | ITA | Giovanni Stroppa |
| MF | ITA | Francesco De Francesco |
| MF | CRO | Zvonimir Boban |
| MF | ITA | Gianluigi Lentini |
| FW | YUG | Dejan Savićević |
| FW | ITA | Paolo Di Canio |
| FW | NED | Ruud Gullit |
| FW | ITA | Marco Simone |
| FW | ITA | Daniele Massaro |
| FW | ITA | Alessandro Melli |
| FW | NED | Marco van Basten |

=== Transfers ===
In
| Pos. | Name | from | Type |
|---|---|---|---|
| FW | Ruud Gullit | Sampdoria | loan ended |
| MF | Massimo Orlando | Fiorentina | |
| DF | Gianluca Sordo | Torino | £2,5m |
| MF | Giovanni Stroppa | Foggia | |
| GK | Carlo Cudicini | Calcio Como | loan ended |
| DF | Roberto Lorenzini | Genoa | loan ended |
| DF | Enzo Gambaro | Napoli | loan ended |

Out
| Pos. | Name | To | Type |
|---|---|---|---|
| FW | Jean-Pierre Papin | Bayern München | |
| FW | Brian Laudrup | Glasgow Rangers | |
| FW | Florin Răducioiu | RCD Espanyol | |
| GK | Francesco Antonioli | Reggiana | |
| MF | Fernando De Napoli | Reggiana | |
| FW | Daniele Guerzoni | Monza Calcio | |
| DF | Mirco Sadotti | Cesena | |
| MF | Francesco Cozza | A.C. Reggiana | loan |
| DF | Enzo Gambaro | Fiorentina | loan |
| MF | Angelo Carbone | Fiorentina | loan |

==== Winter ====
In
| Pos. | Name | from | Type |
|---|---|---|---|
| FW | Paolo Di Canio | SSC Napoli | |
| FW | Alessandro Melli | Sampdoria | loan |

Out
| Pos. | Name | To | Type |
|---|---|---|---|
| FW | Ruud Gullit | Sampdoria | |
| DF | Alessandro Orlando | Juventus | |
| MF | Francesco Cozza | Vicenza | loan |
| DF | Enzo Gambaro | A.C. Reggiana | loan |
| DF | Roberto Lorenzini | Torino | loan |

== Competitions ==
=== Serie A ===
==== League table ====
| Pos | Team | Pld | W | D | L | GF | GA | GD | Pts | Qualification or relegation |
|---|---|---|---|---|---|---|---|---|---|---|
| 2 | Parma | 34 | 18 | 9 | 7 | 51 | 31 | +20 | 63 | Qualification to Cup Winners' Cup |
| 3 | Lazio | 34 | 19 | 6 | 9 | 69 | 34 | +35 | 63 | Qualification to UEFA Cup |
| 4 | Milan | 34 | 17 | 9 | 8 | 53 | 32 | +21 | 60 | Qualification to UEFA Cup |
| 5 | Roma | 34 | 16 | 11 | 7 | 46 | 25 | +21 | 59 | Qualification to UEFA Cup |
| 6 | Internazionale | 34 | 14 | 10 | 10 | 39 | 34 | +5 | 52 | Qualification to UEFA Cup |

Source: Serie A, RSSSF.com, Soccerway
Rules for classification: 1) Points; 2) Head-to-head points; 3) Head-to-head goal difference; 4) Goal difference; 5) Goals scored; 6) Draw. (Note: Head-to-head record is used only after all the matches between the teams in question have been played).

==== Results summary ====
| Overall | | | | | | | | Home | | | | | | Away | | | | | |
| Pld | W | D | L | GF | GA | GD | Pts | W | D | L | GF | GA | GD | W | D | L | GF | GA | GD |
|---|---|---|---|---|---|---|---|---|---|---|---|---|---|---|---|---|---|---|---|
| 34 | 17 | 9 | 8 | 53 | 32 | +21 | 60 | 10 | 5 | 2 | 25 | 11 | +14 | 7 | 4 | 6 | 28 | 21 | +7 |

Source: Competitive matches

==== Results by round ====
| Round | 1 | 2 | 3 | 4 | 5 | 6 | 7 | 8 | 9 | 10 | 11 | 12 | 13 | 14 | 15 | 16 | 17 | 18 | 19 | 20 | 21 | 22 | 23 | 24 | 25 | 26 | 27 | 28 | 29 | 30 | 31 | 32 | 33 | 34 | 35 | 36 | 37 |
|---|---|---|---|---|---|---|---|---|---|---|---|---|---|---|---|---|---|---|---|---|---|---|---|---|---|---|---|---|---|---|---|---|---|---|---|---|---|
| Ground | H | A | H | A | H | A | H | A | H | H | A | H | A | A | A | H | H | A | H | A | H | A | H | A | H | A | A | H | A | A | H | A | H | H | A | H | A |
| Result | W | D | W | L | W | L | D | L | D | D | - | - | W | D | D | D | W | W | W | - | D | D | L | W | W | W | W | L | W | L | W | W | W | W | L | L | W |
| Position | 1 | 4 | 2 | 4 | 4 | 6 | 7 | 11 | 8 | 9 | 11 | 11 | 11 | 9 | 8 | 9 | 7 | 6 | 4 | 5 | 7 | 6 | 7 | 5 | 5 | 3 | 3 | 4 | 3 | 4 | 3 | 3 | 3 | 3 | 3 | 4 | 4 |

Source: Competitive matches
A = Away; H = Home; W = Win; D = Draw; L = Loss; = 1995–96 UEFA Champions League; = 1995–96 UEFA Cup

==== Matches ====
| 4 September 1994 1 | Milan | 1–0 | Genoa | Milan |
| | Simone 53' | Report | | Stadium: San Siro; Attendance: 53,602; Referee: Quartuccio |

| 11 September 1994 2 | Cagliari | 1–1 | Milan | Cagliari |
| | Dely Valdés 34' | Report | Gullit 12' | Stadium: Stadio Sant'Elia; Attendance: 14,842; Referee: Stafoggia |

| 18 September 1994 3 | Milan | 2–1 | Lazio | Milan |
| | Gullit 77', 90' | Report | Bokšić 88' | Stadium: San Siro; Attendance: 63,725; Referee: Pairetto |

| 25 September 1994 4 | Cremonese | 1–0 | Milan | Cremona |
| | Gualco 61' | Report | | Stadium: Stadio Giovanni Zini; Attendance: 13,484; Referee: Bettin |

| 2 October 1994 5 | Milan | 1–0 | Brescia | Milan |
| | Simone 50' | Report | | Stadium: San Siro; Attendance: 54,985; Referee: Bazzoli |

| 16 October 1994 6 | Padova | 2–0 | Milan | Padua |
| | Lalas 23'; Gabrieli 60' | Report | | Stadium: Stadio Euganeo; Attendance: 19,349; Referee: Trentalange |

| 23 October 1994 7 | Milan | 0–0 | Sampdoria | Milan |
| | | Report | | Stadium: San Siro; Attendance: 56,140; Referee: Boggi |

| 30 October 1994 8 | Juventus | 1–0 | Milan | Turin |
| | R. Baggio 43' | Report | | Stadium: Stadio delle Alpi; Attendance: 60,429; Referee: Collina |

| 6 November 1994 9 | Milan | 1–1 | Parma | Milan |
| | Massaro 33' | Report | Crippa 74' | Stadium: San Siro; Attendance: 62,082; Referee: Ceccarini |

| 20 November 1994 10 | Milan | 1–1 | Inter | Milan |
| | Maldini 50' | Report | Fontolan 4' | Stadium: San Siro; Attendance: 71,364; Referee: Stafoggia |

| 11 December 1994 13 | Foggia | 1–3 | Milan | Foggia |
| | Di Biagio 36' | Report | Simone 14', 73'; Savićević 15' | Stadium: Stadio Pino Zaccheria; Attendance: 15,322; Referee: Pairetto |

| 18 December 1994 14 | Roma | 0–0 | Milan | Rome |
| | | Report | | Stadium: Stadio Olimpico; Attendance: 64,439; Referee: Collina |

| 21 December 1994 11 | Torino | 0–0 | Milan | Turin |
| | | Report | | Stadium: Stadio delle Alpi; Attendance: 21,444; Referee: Cinciripini |
Note: Match rescheduled from 27 November 1994 due to the 1994 Intercontinental Cup.

| 8 January 1995 15 | Milan | 1–1 | Napoli | Milan |
| | Simone 73' | Report | Cannavaro 87' | Stadium: San Siro; Attendance: 54,176; Referee: Treossi |

| 11 January 1995 12 | Milan | 2–1 | Reggiana | Milan |
| | Simone 1'; Savićević 88' | | Simutenkov 67' | Stadium: San Siro; Attendance: 48,752; Referee: Borriello |
Note: Match rescheduled from 4 December 1994 due to the 1994 Intercontinental Cup.

| 15 January 1995 16 | Bari | 3–5 | Milan | Bari |
| | Tovalieri 30', 66'; Pedone 73' | Report | Massaro 11'; Savićević 40', 52', 56', 84' | Stadium: Stadio San Nicola; Attendance: 42,000; Referee: Braschi |

| 22 January 1995 17 | Milan | 2–0 | Fiorentina | Milan |
| | Desailly 78'; Di Canio 84' | Report | | Stadium: San Siro; Attendance: 63,236; Referee: Cinciripini |

| 12 February 1995 19 | Milan | 1–1 | Cagliari | Milan |
| | Panucci 53' | Report | Muzzi 14' | Stadium: San Siro; Attendance: 50,581; Referee: Rosica |

| 15 February 1995 18 | Genoa | 1–1 | Milan | Genoa |
| | Skuhravý 45' (pen.) | Report | Panucci 83' | Stadium: Stadio Luigi Ferraris; Attendance: 21,933; Referee: Beschin |
Note: Match suspended on 29 January 1995 after the first half due to the dead of Genovian fan Vincenzo Spagnolo:

| 19 February 1995 20 | Lazio | 4–0 | Milan | Rome |
| | Casiraghi 18'; Signori 52', 64' (pen.); Baresi 79' (o.g.) | Report | | Stadium: Stadio Olimpico; Attendance: 49,729; Referee: Cesari |

| 26 February 1995 21 | Milan | 3–1 | Cremonese | Milan |
| | Boban 2'; Stroppa 35'; Massaro 86' | Report | Chiesa 90' | Stadium: San Siro; Attendance: 49,416; Referee: Rodomonti |

| 5 March 1995 22 | Brescia | 0–5 | Milan | Brescia |
| | | Report | Simone 45', 56', 69'; Maldini 73'; Stroppa 84' | Stadium: Stadio Mario Rigamonti; Attendance: 15,430; Referee: Pellegrino |

| 12 March 1995 23 | Milan | 1–0 | Padova | Milan |
| | Simone 28' | Report | | Stadium: San Siro; Attendance: 52,150; Referee: Braschi |

| 19 March 1995 24 | Sampdoria | 0–3 | Milan | Genoa |
| | | Report | Simone 11'; Albertini 71', 90' | Stadium: Stadio Luigi Ferraris; Attendance: 26,280; Referee: Bettin |

| 1 April 1995 25 | Milan | 0–2 | Juventus | Milan |
| | | Report | Ravanelli 41'; Vialli 81' | Stadium: San Siro; Attendance: 81,550; Referee: Boggi |

| 9 April 1995 26 | Parma | 2–3 | Milan | Parma |
| | Zola 41' (pen.), 84' (pen.) | Report | Lentini 3'; Simone 14' (pen.), 53' | Stadium: Stadio Ennio Tardini; Attendance: 24,446; Referee: Stafoggia |

| 15 April 1995 27 | Inter | 3–1 | Milan | Milan |
| | Seno 43'; Jonk 69'; S. Rossi 87' (o.g.) | Report | Stroppa 85' | Stadium: San Siro; Attendance: 57,962; Referee: Pairetto |

| 23 April 1995 28 | Milan | 5–1 | Torino | Bologna |
| | Savićević 20'; Simone 22'; Lentini 62'; Donadoni 69', 85' | Report | Rizzitelli 32' | Stadium: Stadio Renato Dall'Ara; Attendance: 48,998; Referee: Quartuccio |

| 30 April 1995 29 | Reggiana | 0–4 | Milan | Reggio Emilia |
| | | Report | Lentini 6'; De Napoli 31' (o.g.); Savićević 66'; Simone 82' | Stadium: Stadio Giglio; Attendance: 14,424; Referee: Tombolini |

| 7 May 1995 30 | Milan | 3–0 | Foggia | Milan |
| | Lentini 43'; Savićević 56'; Simone 79' | Report | | Stadium: San Siro; Attendance: 49,959; Referee: Amendolia |

| 14 May 1995 31 | Milan | 1–0 | Roma | Milan |
| | Lentini 34' | Report | | Stadium: San Siro; Attendance: 53,184; Referee: Cesari |

| 18 May 1995 32 | Napoli | 1–0 | Milan | Naples |
| | Agostini 45' | Report | | Stadium: Stadio San Paolo; Attendance: 33,000; Referee: Bazzoli |

| 28 May 1995 33 | Milan | 0–1 | Bari | Milan |
| | | Report | Tovalieri 64' | Stadium: San Siro; Attendance: 50,912; Referee: Pellegrino |

| 4 June 1995 34 | Fiorentina | 1–2 | Milan | Florence |
| | Batistuta 42' | Report | Melli 5'; Simone 79' (pen.) | Stadium: Stadio Artemio Franchi; Attendance: 34,273; Referee: Quartuccio |

=== Coppa Italia ===
==== Second round ====
| 31 August 1994 First Leg | Milan | 0–1 | Palermo | San Siro, Milan |
| 20:30 | | | Iachini 42' | Referee: Giuseppe Rosica |

| 21 September 1994 Second Leg | Palermo | 0–1 (a.e.t.) (1–1 agg.) (2–3 p) | Milan | Stadio La Favorita, Palermo |
| 20:30 | | | Stroppa 25' | Referee: Piero Ceccarini |
| | Penalties |
| | Campilongo (penalty scored); Cicconi (penalty scored); Criniti (penalty missed); Taccola (penalty missed); Biffi (penalty missed) | | (penalty missed) Stroppa; (penalty scored) Albertini; (penalty scored) Sordo; (penalty scored) Galli; (penalty missed) Panucci |

==== Third round ====
| 12 October 1994 First Leg | Milan | 1–2 | Inter | San Siro, Milan |
| 20:30 | Lentini 38' | | Orlandini 56' (pen.); Bergomi 64' | Referee: Pierluigi Collina |

| 26 October 1994 Second Leg | Inter | 2–1 (4–2 agg.) | Milan | San Siro, Milan |
| 20:30 | Sosa 64'; Orlandini 78' | | Donadoni 46' | Referee: Pierluigi Pairetto |

=== Supercoppa Italiana ===
| 28 August 1994 | Milan | 1–1 (a.e.t.) (4–3 p) | Sampdoria | San Siro, Milan |
| 20:30 | Gullit 83' | Report | Mihajlović 35' | Referee: Pierluigi Pairetto |
| | Penalties |
| | Albertini (penalty scored); Boban (penalty scored); Simone (penalty scored); Costacurta (penalty scored) | | (penalty scored) Platt; (penalty scored) Vierchowod; (penalty scored) Jugović; (penalty missed) Evani; (penalty missed) Mihajlović |

=== UEFA Champions League ===
==== Group stage ====
| Pos | Team | Pld | W | D | L | GF | GA | GD | Pts | Qualification |
|---|---|---|---|---|---|---|---|---|---|---|
| 1 | (Netherlands) Ajax | 6 | 4 | 2 | 0 | 9 | 2 | +7 | 10 | Advance to knockout stage |
| 2 | (Italy) Milan | 6 | 3 | 1 | 2 | 6 | 5 | +1 | 5 (Note: Milan were docked two points for crowd trouble against Casino Salzburg on matchday 2. This occurred after Casino Salzburg goalkeeper Otto Konrad was hit on the head with a plastic bottle thrown from the stands, sustaining an injury for which he had to be substituted and taken to the hospital.) | Advance to knockout stage |
| 3 | (Austria) Casino Salzburg | 6 | 1 | 3 | 2 | 4 | 6 | −2 | 5 | |
| 4 | (Greece) AEK Athens | 6 | 0 | 2 | 4 | 3 | 9 | −6 | 2 | |

Source: UEFA
Notes:

| 14 September 1994 1 | Ajax (Netherlands) | 2–0 | (Italy) Milan | Amsterdam |
| 20:30 | R. de Boer 51'; Litmanen 65' | Report | | Stadium: Olympisch Stadium; Attendance: 35,000; Referee: (Spain) Antonio López Nieto |

| 28 September 1994 2 | Milan (Italy) | 3–0 | (Austria) Casino Salzburg | Milan |
| 20:30 | Stroppa 40'; Simone 59', 64' | Report | | Stadium: San Siro; Attendance: 23,000; Referee: (Sweden) Leif Sundell |
Note: Salzburg goalkeeper Otto Konrad was hit on the head with a plastic bottle thrown from the stands and had to be substituted and sent to hospital. Milan were docked two points and were banned from playing their next two home matches at the San Siro.

| 19 October 1994 3 | AEK Athens (Greece) | 0–0 | (Italy) Milan | Nikos Goumas Stadium, Nea Filadelfeia |
| 21:30 | | Report | | Attendance: 19,699; Referee: Sándor Puhl (Hungary) |

| 2 November 1994 4 | Milan (Italy) | 2–1 | (Greece) AEK Athens | Stadio Nereo Rocco, Trieste |
| 20:30 | Panucci 68', 74' | Report | Savevski 16' | Attendance: 17,264; Referee: Vadim Zhuk (Belarus) |

| 23 November 1994 5 | Milan (Italy) | 0–2 | (Netherlands) Ajax | Stadio Nereo Rocco, Trieste |
| 20:30 | | Report | Litmanen 2'; Baresi 66' (o.g.) | Attendance: 29,764; Referee: Peter Mikkelsen (Denmark) |

| 7 December 1994 6 | Casino Salzburg (Austria) | 0–1 | (Italy) Milan | Ernst-Happel-Stadion, Vienna |
| 20:30 | | Report | Massaro 26' | Attendance: 48,000; Referee: Ion Crăciunescu (Romania) |

==== Knockout phase ====
===== Quarter-finals =====
| 1 March 1995 1 | Milan (Italy) | 2–0 | (Portugal) Benfica | San Siro, Milan |
| 21:00 | Simone 63', 75' | Report | | Attendance: 60,000; Referee: Ahmet Çakar (Turkey) |

| 15 March 1995 2 | Benfica (Portugal) | 0–0 (0–2 agg.) | (Italy) Milan | Estádio da Luz, Lisbon |
| 20:15 | | Report | | Attendance: 60,000; Referee: Guy Goethals (Belgium) |

===== Semi-finals =====
| 5 April 1995 1 | Paris Saint-Germain (France) | 0–1 | (Italy) Milan | Parc des Princes, Paris |
| 20:30 | | Report | Boban 90+1' | Attendance: 44,000; Referee: Serge Muhmenthaler (Switzerland) |

| 19 April 1995 2 | Milan (Italy) | 2–0 (3–0 agg.) | (France) Paris Saint-Germain | San Siro, Milan |
| 20:30 | Savićević 21', 68' | Report | | Attendance: 79,855; Referee: Leslie Mottram (Scotland) |

===== Final =====
| 24 May 1995 | Ajax (Netherlands) | 1–0 | (Italy) Milan | Ernst Happel Stadion, Vienna |
| 20:30 | Kluivert 85' | Report | | Attendance: 49,730; Referee: Ion Crăciunescu (Romania) |

=== Intercontinental Cup ===
| 1 December 1994 | Milan (Italy) | 0–2 | (Argentina) Vélez Sársfield | National Stadium, Tokyo |
| 18:15 | | Report | Roberto Trotta 50' (pen.); Omar Asad 57' | Attendance: 47,886; Referee: José Torres Cadena (Colombia) |

=== European Super Cup ===
| 1 February 1995 1 | Arsenal (England) | 0–0 | (Italy) Milan | Highbury, London |
| 20:00 | | | | Attendance: 38,044; Referee: Mario van der Ende (Netherlands) |

| 8 February 1995 2 | Milan (Italy) | 2–0 (2–0 agg.) | (England) Arsenal | San Siro, Milan |
| 20:30 | Boban 41'; Massaro 67' | | | Attendance: 23,953; Referee: Hellmut Krug (Germany) |

== Statistics ==
=== Players statistics ===
| No. | Pos | Nat | Player | Total | | Serie A | | Champions League | | Coppa | |
| No. | Pos | Nat | Player | Apps | Goals | Apps | Goals | Apps | Goals | Apps | Goals |
|---|---|---|---|---|---|---|---|---|---|---|---|
| | GK | (Italy) ITA | Rossi | 45 | -38 | 34 | -32 | 11 | -6 | 0 | 0 |
| | DF | (Italy) ITA | Panucci | 42 | 4 | 28 | 2 | 9+1 | 2 | 4 | 0 |
| | DF | (Italy) ITA | Costacurta | 36 | 0 | 27 | 0 | 5+1 | 0 | 3 | 0 |
| | DF | (Italy) ITA | Baresi | 39 | 0 | 28 | 0 | 11 | 0 | 0 | 0 |
| | DF | (Italy) ITA | Maldini | 41 | 2 | 29 | 2 | 11 | 0 | 1 | 0 |
| | MF | (Italy) ITA | Donadoni | 40 | 3 | 24+6 | 2 | 7+1 | 0 | 2 | 1 |
| | MF | (Italy) ITA | Albertini | 43 | 2 | 28+2 | 2 | 9 | 0 | 4 | 0 |
| | MF | (France) FRA | Desailly | 33 | 1 | 22 | 1 | 10 | 0 | 1 | 0 |
| | MF | (Croatia) CRO | Boban | 32 | 2 | 20+1 | 1 | 9 | 1 | 2 | 0 |
| | FW | (Federal Republic of Yugoslavia) YUG | Savicevic | 26 | 11 | 18+1 | 9 | 6 | 2 | 1 | 0 |
| | FW | (Italy) ITA | Simone | 42 | 21 | 29+1 | 17 | 9 | 4 | 3 | 0 |
| | GK | (Italy) ITA | Ielpo | 4 | -5 | 0 | 0 | 0 | 0 | 4 | -5 |
| | DF | (Italy) ITA | Galli | 28 | 0 | 13+6 | 0 | 4+2 | 0 | 3 | 0 |
| | FW | (Italy) ITA | Massaro | 28 | 4 | 13+6 | 3 | 6+2 | 1 | 1 | 0 |
| | MF | (Italy) ITA | Stroppa | 28 | 5 | 10+9 | 3 | 1+6 | 1 | 2 | 1 |
| | MF | (Italy) ITA | Lentini | 25 | 6 | 14+3 | 5 | 0+4 | 0 | 4 | 1 |
| | MF | (Italy) ITA | Eranio | 15 | 0 | 10+1 | 0 | 3+1 | 0 | 0 | 0 |
| | FW | (Netherlands) NED | Gullit | 13 | 3 | 8 | 3 | 3 | 0 | 2 | 0 |
| | FW | (Italy) ITA | Di Canio | 17 | 1 | 4+11 | 1 | 0 | 0 | 2 | 0 |
| | DF | (Italy) ITA | Tassotti | 21 | 0 | 9+3 | 0 | 4+1 | 0 | 4 | 0 |
| | MF | (Italy) ITA | Sordo | 12 | 0 | 2+5 | 0 | 1+1 | 0 | 3 | 0 |
| | FW | (Italy) ITA | Melli | 6 | 1 | 2+4 | 1 | 0 | 0 | 0 | 0 |
| | MF | (Italy) ITA | M.Orlando | 3 | 0 | 2 | 0 | 1 | 0 | 0 | 0 |
| | DF | (Italy) ITA | Orlando | 2 | 0 | 0+2 | 0 | 0 | 0 | 0 | 0 |
| | DF | (Italy) ITA | Nava | 5 | 0 | 0+2 | 0 | 1 | 0 | 2 | 0 |
| | GK | (Italy) ITA | Cudicini | 0 | 0 | 0 | 0 | 0 | 0 | 0 | 0 |
| | MF | (Italy) ITA | De Francesco | 0 | 0 | 0 | 0 | 0 | 0 | 0 | 0 |
| | FW | (Netherlands) NED | Van Basten | 0 | 0 | 0 | 0 | 0 | 0 | 0 | 0 |

- Source: https://www.bdfutbol.com/en/t/t1994-953015.html

== Sources ==
- Panini, Edizioni (2005). Almanacco Illustrato del Calcio – La Storia 1898-2004 (in Italian). Panini.
- RSSSF – Italy 1994/95
