= 1994–95 UEFA Champions League qualifying round =

European football tournament

Qualifying round for the 1994–95 UEFA Champions League.

== Teams ==
The sixteen lowest-ranked teams that qualified for the Champions League entered the qualifying round.

Key to colours
Winners of qualifying round advanced to group stage

Qualifying round participants
Team	Coeff.
(France) Paris Saint-Germain	1.426
(Scotland) Rangers	1.400
(Poland) Legia Warsaw	1.400
(Austria) Casino Salzburg	1.214
(Sweden) IFK Göteborg	1.187
(Ukraine) Dynamo Kyiv	1.178
(Turkey) Galatasaray	1.125
(Romania) Steaua București	1.125
(Czech Republic) Sparta Prague	1.115
(Greece) AEK Athens	1.000
(Croatia) Hajduk Split	1.000
(Israel) Maccabi Haifa	1.000
(Switzerland) Servette	0.906
(Hungary) Vác Samsung	0.875
(Denmark) Silkeborg	0.803
(Luxembourg) Avenir Beggen	0.750

== Seeding ==
The sixteen teams were divided into seeded and unseeded pots, each containing eight teams, for the draw based on their club seeding coefficient.

Seeded	Unseeded
(France) Paris Saint-Germain; (Scotland) Rangers; (Poland) Legia Warsaw; (Austria) Casino Salzburg; (Sweden) IFK Göteborg; (Ukraine) Dynamo Kyiv; (Turkey) Galatasaray; (Romania) Steaua București	(Czech Republic) Sparta Prague; (Greece) AEK Athens; (Croatia) Hajduk Split; (Israel) Maccabi Haifa; (Switzerland) Servette; (Hungary) Vác Samsung; (Denmark) Silkeborg; (Luxembourg) Avenir Beggen

== Summary ==
Team 1	Agg.	Team 2	1st leg	2nd leg
Group A
Avenir Beggen (Luxembourg)	1–9	(Turkey) Galatasaray	1–5	0–4
Sparta Prague (Czech Republic)	1–2	(Sweden) IFK Göteborg	1–0	0–2
Group B
Silkeborg (Denmark)	1–3	(Ukraine) Dynamo Kyiv	0–0	1–3
Paris Saint-Germain (France)	5–1	(Hungary) Vác Samsung	3–0	2–1
Group C
Legia Warsaw (Poland)	0–5	(Croatia) Hajduk Split	0–1	0–4
Steaua București (Romania)	5–2	(Switzerland) Servette	4–1	1–1
Group D
AEK Athens (Greece)	3–0	(Scotland) Rangers	2–0	1–0
Maccabi Haifa (Israel)	2–5	(Austria) Casino Salzburg	1–2	1–3

== Matches ==
=== Group A ===
10 August 1994
20:30

Avenir Beggen (Luxembourg)	1–5	(Turkey) Galatasaray
Zaritskiy 49'	Report	Türkyilmaz 29'; Saffet 34'; Hakan 71'; Arif 75', 89'

Stade rue Henri Dunant, Luxembourg City
Attendance: 6,200
Referee: Kenny Clark (Scotland)
24 August 1994
20:00

Galatasaray (Turkey)	4–0	(Luxembourg) Avenir Beggen
Hakan 53', 70', 85' (pen.); Saffet 63'	Report

İzmir Atatürk Stadium, İzmir
Attendance: 61,810
Referee: Dimitar Momirov (Bulgaria)

Galatasaray won 9–1 on aggregate.

10 August 1994
17:00

Sparta Prague (Czech Republic)	1–0	(Sweden) IFK Göteborg
Budka 88'	Report

Stadion Střelnice, Jablonec nad Nisou
Attendance: 9,600
Referee: Serge Muhmenthaler (Switzerland)
24 August 1994
19:05

IFK Göteborg (Sweden)	2–0	(Czech Republic) Sparta Prague
Blomqvist 22'; Rehn 64'	Report

Gamla Ullevi, Gothenburg
Attendance: 13,969
Referee: Vadim Zhuk (Belarus)

IFK Göteborg won 2–1 on aggregate.

=== Group B ===
10 August 1994
20:05

Silkeborg (Denmark)	0–0	(Ukraine) Dynamo Kyiv
	Report

Silkeborg Stadion, Silkeborg
Attendance: 4,298
Referee: Éric Blareau (Belgium)
24 August 1994
19:00

Dynamo Kyiv (Ukraine)	3–1	(Denmark) Silkeborg
Skachenko 19'; Kovalets 26'; Kosovskyi 89'	Report	Fernandez 73'

Respublikanskiy Stadium, Kyiv
Attendance: 60,000
Referee: Jaap Uilenberg (Netherlands)

Dynamo Kyiv won 3–1 on aggregate.

10 August 1994
20:30

Paris Saint-Germain (France)	3–0	(Hungary) Vác Samsung
Ricardo Gomes 29'; Weah 48'; Roche 83'	Report

Parc des Princes, Paris
Attendance: 29,637
Referee: Antonio López Nieto (Spain)
24 August 1994
20:00

Vác Samsung (Hungary)	1–2	(France) Paris Saint-Germain
Füle 31'	Report	Mboma 20', 66'

Fáy utcai Stadion, Budapest
Attendance: 1,500
Referee: Angelo Amendolia (Italy)

Paris Saint-Germain won 5–1 on aggregate.

=== Group C ===
10 August 1994
20:15

Legia Warsaw (Poland)	0–1	(Croatia) Hajduk Split
	Report	Rapaić 22'

Stadion Wojska Polskiego, Warsaw
Attendance: 7,249
Referee: Gerd Grabher (Austria)
24 August 1994
20:15

Hajduk Split (Croatia)	4–0	(Poland) Legia Warsaw
Asanović 49', 60'; Rapaić 77'; Erceg 88'	Report

Stadion Poljud, Split
Attendance: 16,183
Referee: David Elleray (England)

Hajduk Split won 5–0 on aggregate.

10 August 1994
20:30

Steaua București (Romania)	4–1	(Switzerland) Servette
Ilie 1'; Stan 16' (pen.); Pârvu 25'; Lăcătuș 49'	Report	Sinval 71'

Stadionul Steaua, Bucharest
Attendance: 8,000
Referee: Vassilios Nikakis (Greece)
24 August 1994
20:15

Servette (Switzerland)	1–1	(Romania) Steaua București
Schepull 13'	Report	Pârvu 51'

Stade des Charmilles, Geneva
Attendance: 5,800
Referee: Markus Merk (Germany)

Steaua București won 5–2 on aggregate.

=== Group D ===
10 August 1994
21:00

AEK Athens (Greece)	2–0	(Scotland) Rangers
Saravakos 44', 65'	Report

Nikos Goumas Stadium, Nea Filadelfeia
Attendance: 21,994
Referee: Peter Mikkelsen (Denmark)
24 August 1994
20:00

Rangers (Scotland)	0–1	(Greece) AEK Athens
	Report	Savevski 43'

Ibrox Park, Glasgow
Attendance: 44,789
Referee: Leif Sundell (Sweden)

AEK Athens won 3–0 on aggregate.

10 August 1994
19:00

Maccabi Haifa (Israel)	1–2	(Austria) Casino Salzburg
Revivo 68' (pen.)	Report	Hütter 82'; Mladenović 89' (pen.)

Kiryat Eliezer Stadium, Haifa
Attendance: 6,500
Referee: Ahmet Çakar (Turkey)
24 August 1994
20:20

Casino Salzburg (Austria)	3–1	(Israel) Maccabi Haifa
Mladenović 48', 53'; Jurčević 78'	Report	Hazan 90'

Ernst-Happel-Stadion, Vienna
Attendance: 13,500
Referee: Václav Krondl (Czech Republic)

Casino Salzburg won 5–2 on aggregate.
