= 1994–95 UEFA Champions League group stage =

European football competition group stage

The group stage of the 1994–95 UEFA Champions League began on 14 September 1994 and ended on 7 December 1994. Eight teams qualified automatically for the group stage, while eight more qualified via a preliminary round. The 16 teams were divided into four groups of four, and the teams in each group played against each other on a home-and-away basis, meaning that each team played a total of six group matches. For each win, teams were awarded two points (the last time this would be used), with one point awarded for each draw. At the end of the group stage, the two teams in each group with the most points advanced to the quarter-finals.

== Groups ==
=== Group A ===
Pos	Team	Pld	W	D	L	GF	GA	GD	Pts	Qualification	GOT	BAR	MUN	GAL
1	(Sweden) IFK Göteborg	6	4	1	1	10	7	+3	9	Advance to knockout stage	—	2–1	3–1	1–0
2	(Spain) Barcelona	6	2	2	2	11	8	+3	6	Advance to knockout stage	1–1	—	4–0	2–1
3	(England) Manchester United	6	2	2	2	11	11	0	6		4–2	2–2	—	4–0
4	(Turkey) Galatasaray	6	1	1	4	3	9	−6	3		0–1	2–1	0–0	—

Source: UEFA
14 September 1994
20:30

Barcelona (Spain)	2–1	(Turkey) Galatasaray
Koeman 30'; Amor 50'	Report	Türkyilmaz 14'

Camp Nou, Barcelona
Attendance: 80,000
Referee: Piero Ceccarini (Italy)
14 September 1994
19:30

Manchester United (England)	4–2	(Sweden) IFK Göteborg
Giggs 33', 65'; Kanchelskis 48'; Sharpe 70'	Report	Pettersson 27'; Rehn 50'

Old Trafford, Manchester
Attendance: 33,625
Referee: Guy Goethals (Belgium)

28 September 1994
21:30

Galatasaray (Turkey)	0–0	(England) Manchester United
	Report

Ali Sami Yen Stadium, Istanbul
Attendance: 24,385
Referee: Mario van der Ende (Netherlands)
28 September 1994
20:30

IFK Göteborg (Sweden)	2–1	(Spain) Barcelona
Erlingmark 74'; Blomqvist 89'	Report	Stoichkov 10'

Ullevi, Gothenburg
Attendance: 32,215
Referee: Bernd Heynemann (Germany)

19 October 1994
20:30

IFK Göteborg (Sweden)	1–0	(Turkey) Galatasaray
Erlingmark 76'	Report

Ullevi, Gothenburg
Attendance: 26,412
Referee: Gerd Grabher (Austria)
19 October 1994
19:30

Manchester United (England)	2–2	(Spain) Barcelona
Hughes 19'; Sharpe 80'	Report	Romário 34'; Bakero 49'

Old Trafford, Manchester
Attendance: 40,064
Referee: Ion Crăciunescu (Romania)

2 November 1994
20:30

Barcelona (Spain)	4–0	(England) Manchester United
Stoichkov 9', 52'; Romário 45'; Ferrer 88'	Report

Camp Nou, Barcelona
Attendance: 114,273
Referee: Joël Quiniou (France)
2 November 1994
21:30

Galatasaray (Turkey)	0–1	(Sweden) IFK Göteborg
	Report	Erlingmark 86'

Ali Sami Yen Stadium, Istanbul
Attendance: 27,300
Referee: Václav Krondl (Czech Republic)

23 November 1994
21:30

Galatasaray (Turkey)	2–1	(Spain) Barcelona
Şükür 72' (pen.); Arif 88'	Report	Romário 15'

Ali Sami Yen Stadium, Istanbul
Attendance: 18,375
Referee: Vadim Zhuk (Belarus)
23 November 1994
20:30

IFK Göteborg (Sweden)	3–1	(England) Manchester United
Blomqvist 11'; Erlingmark 65'; Kåmark 72' (pen.)	Report	Hughes 64'

Ullevi, Gothenburg
Attendance: 36,385
Referee: Alfredo Trentalange (Italy)

7 December 1994
20:30

Barcelona (Spain)	1–1	(Sweden) IFK Göteborg
Bakero 81'	Report	Rehn 90'

Camp Nou, Barcelona
Attendance: 76,000
Referee: Frans Van Den Wijngaert (Belgium)
7 December 1994
19:30

Manchester United (England)	4–0	(Turkey) Galatasaray
Davies 2'; Beckham 37'; Keane 48'; Bülent 87' (o.g.)	Report

Old Trafford, Manchester
Attendance: 39,220
Referee: Ryszard Wójcik (Poland)

=== Group B ===
Pos	Team	Pld	W	D	L	GF	GA	GD	Pts	Qualification	PAR	BAY	SPM	DKV
1	(France) Paris Saint-Germain	6	6	0	0	12	3	+9	12	Advance to knockout stage	—	2–0	4–1	1–0
2	(Germany) Bayern Munich	6	2	2	2	8	7	+1	6	Advance to knockout stage	0–1	—	2–2	1–0
3	(Russia) Spartak Moscow	6	1	2	3	8	12	−4	4		1–2	1–1	—	1–0
4	(Ukraine) Dynamo Kyiv	6	1	0	5	5	11	−6	2		1–2	1–4	3–2	—

Source: UEFA
14 September 1994
21:30

Dynamo Kyiv (Ukraine)	3–2	(Russia) Spartak Moscow
Leonenko 48', 76'; Rebrov 86'	Report	Pisarev 12'; Tikhonov 38'

Respublikanskiy Stadium, Kyiv
Attendance: 90,500
Referee: Gerd Grabher (Austria)
14 September 1994
20:30

Paris Saint-Germain (France)	2–0	(Germany) Bayern Munich
Weah 41'; Bravo 83'	Report

Parc des Princes, Paris
Attendance: 36,924
Referee: David Elleray (England)

28 September 1994
20:30

Bayern Munich (Germany)	1–0	(Ukraine) Dynamo Kyiv
Scholl 9'	Report

Olympiastadion, Munich
Attendance: 26,000
Referee: Ion Crăciunescu (Romania)
28 September 1994
19:15

Spartak Moscow (Russia)	1–2	(France) Paris Saint-Germain
Rakhimov 40'	Report	Le Guen 52'; Valdo 60'

Luzhniki Stadium, Moscow
Attendance: 30,000
Referee: Bo Karlsson (Sweden)

19 October 1994
21:30

Dynamo Kyiv (Ukraine)	1–2	(France) Paris Saint-Germain
Leonenko 33' (pen.)	Report	Guérin 26'; Weah 75'

Respublikanskiy Stadium, Kyiv
Attendance: 93,700
Referee: Piero Ceccarini (Italy)
19 October 1994
19:15

Spartak Moscow (Russia)	1–1	(Germany) Bayern Munich
Pisarev 77'	Report	Babbel 90'

Luzhniki Stadium, Moscow
Attendance: 11,752
Referee: Guy Goethals (Belgium)

2 November 1994
20:30

Bayern Munich (Germany)	2–2	(Russia) Spartak Moscow
Nerlinger 28'; Kuffour 36'	Report	Tikhonov 4'; Alenichev 32'

Olympiastadion, Munich
Attendance: 31,000
Referee: Mario van der Ende (Netherlands)
2 November 1994
20:30

Paris Saint-Germain (France)	1–0	(Ukraine) Dynamo Kyiv
Weah 68'	Report

Parc des Princes, Paris
Attendance: 33,741
Referee: Ahmet Çakar (Turkey)

23 November 1994
20:30

Bayern Munich (Germany)	0–1	(France) Paris Saint-Germain
	Report	Weah 80'

Olympiastadion, Munich
Attendance: 46,000
Referee: Manuel Díaz Vega (Spain)
23 November 1994
18:00

Spartak Moscow (Russia)	1–0	(Ukraine) Dynamo Kyiv
Mukhamadiev 51'	Report

Luzhniki Stadium, Moscow
Attendance: 18,500
Referee: Rune Pedersen (Norway)

7 December 1994
21:30

Dynamo Kyiv (Ukraine)	1–4	(Germany) Bayern Munich
Shevchenko 38'	Report	Nerlinger 45'; Papin 57', 82'; Scholl 87'

Respublikanskiy Stadium, Kyiv
Attendance: 44,000
Referee: Václav Krondl (Czech Republic)
7 December 1994
20:30

Paris Saint-Germain (France)	4–1	(Russia) Spartak Moscow
Weah 30', 52'; Ginola 42'; Raí 59'	Report	Rodionov 67'

Parc des Princes, Paris
Attendance: 31,461
Referee: Atanas Uzunov (Bulgaria)

=== Group C ===
Pos	Team	Pld	W	D	L	GF	GA	GD	Pts	Qualification	BEN	HAJ	STE	AND
1	(Portugal) Benfica	6	3	3	0	9	5	+4	9	Advance to knockout stage	—	2–1	2–1	3–1
2	(Croatia) Hajduk Split	6	2	2	2	5	7	−2	6	Advance to knockout stage	0–0	—	1–4	2–1
3	(Romania) Steaua București	6	1	3	2	7	6	+1	5		1–1	0–1	—	1–1
4	(Belgium) Anderlecht	6	0	4	2	4	7	−3	4		1–1	0–0	0–0	—

Source: UEFA
14 September 1994
20:30

Anderlecht (Belgium)	0–0	(Romania) Steaua București
	Report

Constant Vanden Stock Stadium, Brussels
Attendance: 13,053
Referee: Leslie Mottram (Scotland)
14 September 1994
20:30

Hajduk Split (Croatia)	0–0	(Portugal) Benfica
	Report

Stadion Poljud, Split
Attendance: 26,000
Referee: Serge Muhmenthaler (Switzerland)

28 September 1994
20:30

Benfica (Portugal)	3–1	(Belgium) Anderlecht
Caniggia 26', 40'; Tavares 72'	Report	Madeira 88' (o.g.)

Estádio da Luz, Lisbon
Attendance: 32,000
Referee: Vadim Zhuk (Belarus)
28 September 1994
21:30

Steaua București (Romania)	0–1	(Croatia) Hajduk Split
	Report	Asanović 89'

Stadionul Steaua, Bucharest
Attendance: 20,000
Referee: Václav Krondl (Czech Republic)

19 October 1994
20:30

Benfica (Portugal)	2–1	(Romania) Steaua București
Caniggia 44' (pen.); João Pinto 60'	Report	Militaru 89'

Estádio da Luz, Lisbon
Attendance: 18,100
Referee: David Elleray (England)
19 October 1994
20:30

Hajduk Split (Croatia)	2–1	(Belgium) Anderlecht
Pralija 34'; Butorović 86'	Report	Weber 88'

Stadion Poljud, Split
Attendance: 28,000
Referee: Antonio López Nieto (Spain)

2 November 1994
21:30

Steaua București (Romania)	1–1	(Portugal) Benfica
Panduru 27'	Report	Hélder 63'

Stadionul Steaua, Bucharest
Attendance: 17,000
Referee: Leif Sundell (Sweden)
2 November 1994
20:30

Anderlecht (Belgium)	0–0	(Croatia) Hajduk Split
	Report

Constant Vanden Stock Stadium, Brussels
Attendance: 20,399
Referee: Markus Merk (Germany)

23 November 1994
20:30

Benfica (Portugal)	2–1	(Croatia) Hajduk Split
Isaías 32'; João Pinto 76'	Report	Andrijašević 71'

Estádio da Luz, Lisbon
Attendance: 31,200
Referee: John Blankenstein (Netherlands)
23 November 1994
21:30

Steaua București (Romania)	1–1	(Belgium) Anderlecht
Doboș 54'	Report	Bosman 43'

Stadionul Steaua, Bucharest
Attendance: 10,200
Referee: Ilkka Koho (Finland)

7 December 1994
20:30

Anderlecht (Belgium)	1–1	(Portugal) Benfica
Rutjes 48'	Report	Edílson 82'

Constant Vanden Stock Stadium, Brussels
Attendance: 18,300
Referee: Marc Batta (France)
7 December 1994
20:30

Hajduk Split (Croatia)	1–4	(Romania) Steaua București
Andrijašević 48'	Report	Ilie 11', 31'; Lăcătuș 23'; Gâlcă 90'

Stadion Poljud, Split
Attendance: 15,000
Referee: Jim McCluskey (Scotland)

=== Group D ===
Pos	Team	Pld	W	D	L	GF	GA	GD	Pts	Qualification	AJX	MIL	SAL	AEK
1	(Netherlands) Ajax	6	4	2	0	9	2	+7	10	Advance to knockout stage	—	2–0	1–1	2–0
2	(Italy) Milan	6	3	1	2	6	5	+1	5 (Note: Milan were docked two points for crowd trouble against Casino Salzburg on matchday 2. This occurred after Casino Salzburg goalkeeper Otto Konrad was hit on the head with a plastic bottle thrown from the stands, sustaining an injury for which he had to be substituted and taken to the hospital.)	Advance to knockout stage	0–2	—	3–0	2–1
3	(Austria) Casino Salzburg	6	1	3	2	4	6	−2	5		0–0	0–1	—	0–0
4	(Greece) AEK Athens	6	0	2	4	3	9	−6	2		1–2	0–0	1–3	—

Source: UEFA
Notes:
14 September 1994
20:30

Ajax (Netherlands)	2–0	(Italy) Milan
R. de Boer 51'; Litmanen 65'	Report

Olympisch Stadion, Amsterdam
Attendance: 35,000
Referee: Antonio López Nieto (Spain)
14 September 1994
20:30

Casino Salzburg (Austria)	0–0	(Greece) AEK Athens
	Report

Ernst-Happel-Stadion, Vienna
Attendance: 23,000
Referee: Rémi Harrel (France)

28 September 1994
21:30

AEK Athens (Greece)	1–2	(Netherlands) Ajax
Savevski 30'	Report	Litmanen 33'; Kluivert 63'

Nikos Goumas Stadium, Nea Filadelfeia
Attendance: 24,747
Referee: Markus Merk (Germany)
28 September 1994
20:30

Milan (Italy)	3–0	(Austria) Casino Salzburg
Stroppa 39'; Simone 59', 64'	Report

San Siro, Milan
Attendance: 22,475
Referee: Leif Sundell (Sweden)

19 October 1994
21:30

AEK Athens (Greece)	0–0	(Italy) Milan
	Report

Nikos Goumas Stadium, Nea Filadelfeia
Attendance: 19,699
Referee: Sándor Puhl (Hungary)
19 October 1994
20:30

Casino Salzburg (Austria)	0–0	(Netherlands) Ajax
	Report

Ernst-Happel-Stadion, Vienna
Attendance: 18,200
Referee: Kurt Röthlisberger (Switzerland)

2 November 1994
20:30

Ajax (Netherlands)	1–1	(Austria) Casino Salzburg
Litmanen 85'	Report	Kocijan 63'

Olympisch Stadion, Amsterdam
Attendance: 39,200
Referee: Leslie Mottram (Scotland)
2 November 1994
20:30

Milan (Italy)	2–1	(Greece) AEK Athens
Panucci 68', 73'	Report	Savevski 15'

Stadio Nereo Rocco, Trieste (Note: Milan were banned from playing two home matches at their home ground, San Siro, due to crowd trouble against Casino Salzburg on matchday 2.)
Attendance: 17,264
Referee: Vadim Zhuk (Belarus)

23 November 1994
21:30

AEK Athens (Greece)	1–3	(Austria) Casino Salzburg
Vlachos 28'	Report	Pfeifenberger 7', 9'; Hasenhüttl 77'

Nikos Goumas Stadium, Nea Filadelfeia
Attendance: 15,000
Referee: Guy Goethals (Belgium)
23 November 1994
20:30

Milan (Italy)	0–2	(Netherlands) Ajax
	Report	Litmanen 2'; Baresi 66' (o.g.)

Stadio Nereo Rocco, Trieste
Attendance: 29,764
Referee: Peter Mikkelsen (Denmark)

7 December 1994
20:30

Ajax (Netherlands)	2–0	(Greece) AEK Athens
Oulida 7', 81'	Report

Olympisch Stadion, Amsterdam
Attendance: 39,138
Referee: Jorge Coroado (Portugal)
7 December 1994
20:30

Casino Salzburg (Austria)	0–1	(Italy) Milan
	Report	Massaro 26'

Ernst-Happel-Stadion, Vienna
Attendance: 48,000
Referee: Ion Crăciunescu (Romania)
