= 1994–95 UEFA Champions League knockout stage =

European football competition stage

The knockout stage of the 1994–95 UEFA Champions League began on 1 March 1995 and ended with the final at the Ernst-Happel-Stadion in Vienna, Austria, on 24 May 1995. The top two teams from each of the four groups in the group stage competed in the knockout stage. For the quarter-finals, each group winner was randomly drawn against the runner-up from another group, with the group winner hosting the second leg. The four quarter-final winners were then drawn together for the semi-finals, the winners of which contested the final.

== Qualified teams ==
The knockout stage involved the eight teams which qualified as winners and runners-up of all four groups in the group stage.

Group	Winners (seeded in quarter-final draw)	Runners-up (unseeded in quarter-final draw)
A	(Sweden) IFK Göteborg	(Spain) Barcelona
B	(France) Paris Saint-Germain	(Germany) Bayern Munich
C	(Portugal) Benfica	(Croatia) Hajduk Split
D	(Netherlands) Ajax	(Italy) Milan

== Format ==
Each quarter-final and semi-final was played over two legs, with each team playing one leg at home; the team that scored the most goals over the two legs qualified for the following round. In the event that the two teams scored the same number of goals over the two legs, the team that scored more goals away from home qualified for the next round; if both teams scored the same number of away goals, matches would go to extra time and then penalties if the teams could not be separated after extra time.

== Bracket ==
Quarter-finals
(Germany) Bayern Munich (a)	0	2	2
(Sweden) IFK Göteborg	0	2	2
(Croatia) Hajduk Split	0	0	0
(Netherlands) Ajax	0	3	3
(Spain) Barcelona	1	1	2
(France) Paris Saint-Germain	1	2	3
(Italy) Milan	2	0	2
(Portugal) Benfica	0	0	0

Semi-finals
(Germany) Bayern Munich	0	2	2
(Netherlands) Ajax	0	5	5
(France) Paris Saint-Germain	0	0	0
(Italy) Milan	1	2	3

Final
24 May – Vienna
(Netherlands) Ajax	1
(Italy) Milan	0

== Quarter-finals ==
=== Summary ===
Team 1	Agg.	Team 2	1st leg	2nd leg
Bayern Munich (Germany)	2–2 (a)	(Sweden) IFK Göteborg	0–0	2–2
Hajduk Split (Croatia)	0–3	(Netherlands) Ajax	0–0	0–3
Barcelona (Spain)	2–3	(France) Paris Saint-Germain	1–1	1–2
Milan (Italy)	2–0	(Portugal) Benfica	2–0	0–0

=== Matches ===
1 March 1995
19:00

Bayern Munich (Germany)	0–0	(Sweden) IFK Göteborg
	Report

Olympiastadion, Munich
Attendance: 46,000
Referee: Sergei Khusainov (Russia)
15 March 1995
18:45

IFK Göteborg (Sweden)	2–2	(Germany) Bayern Munich
Lilienberg 79'; Martinsson 90'	Report	Zickler 64'; Nerlinger 72'

Ullevi, Gothenburg
Attendance: 36,525
Referee: Leslie Mottram (Scotland)

2–2 on aggregate; Bayern Munich won on away goals.

1 March 1995
19:00

Hajduk Split (Croatia)	0–0	(Netherlands) Ajax
	Report

Stadion Poljud, Split
Attendance: 34,250
Referee: Ryszard Wójcik (Poland)
15 March 1995
18:45

Ajax (Netherlands)	3–0	(Croatia) Hajduk Split
Kanu 34'; F. de Boer 43', 67'	Report

Olympisch Stadion, Amsterdam
Attendance: 42,000
Referee: Ion Crăciunescu (Romania)

Ajax won 3–0 on aggregate.

1 March 1995
21:00

Barcelona (Spain)	1–1	(France) Paris Saint-Germain
Korneev 47'	Report	Weah 54'

Camp Nou, Barcelona
Attendance: 115,500
Referee: Václav Krondl (Czech Republic)
15 March 1995
21:15

Paris Saint-Germain (France)	2–1	(Spain) Barcelona
Raí 72'; Guérin 83'	Report	Bakero 50'

Parc des Princes, Paris
Attendance: 45,604
Referee: Gerd Grabher (Austria)

Paris Saint-Germain won 3–2 on aggregate.

1 March 1995
21:00

Milan (Italy)	2–0	(Portugal) Benfica
Simone 63', 75'	Report

San Siro, Milan
Attendance: 48,858
Referee: Ahmet Çakar (Turkey)
15 March 1995
21:15

Benfica (Portugal)	0–0	(Italy) Milan
	Report

Estádio da Luz, Lisbon
Attendance: 52,500
Referee: Guy Goethals (Belgium)

Milan won 2–0 on aggregate.

== Semi-finals ==
=== Summary ===
Team 1	Agg.	Team 2	1st leg	2nd leg
Bayern Munich (Germany)	2–5	(Netherlands) Ajax	0–0	2–5
Paris Saint-Germain (France)	0–3	(Italy) Milan	0–1	0–2

=== Matches ===
5 April 1995
20:30

Bayern Munich (Germany)	0–0	(Netherlands) Ajax
	Report

Olympiastadion, Munich
Attendance: 60,000
Referee: Ahmet Çakar (Turkey)
19 April 1995
20:30

Ajax (Netherlands)	5–2	(Germany) Bayern Munich
Litmanen 12', 46'; George 41'; R. de Boer 44'; Overmars 88'	Report	Witeczek 36'; Scholl 75' (pen.)

Olympisch Stadion, Amsterdam
Attendance: 42,000
Referee: Sándor Puhl (Hungary)

Ajax won 5–2 on aggregate.

5 April 1995
20:30

Paris Saint-Germain (France)	0–1	(Italy) Milan
	Report	Boban 90+1'

Parc des Princes, Paris
Attendance: 44,965
Referee: Serge Muhmenthaler (Switzerland)
19 April 1995
20:30

Milan (Italy)	2–0	(France) Paris Saint-Germain
Savićević 21', 68'	Report

San Siro, Milan
Attendance: 79,885
Referee: Leslie Mottram (Scotland)

Milan won 3–0 on aggregate.

== Final ==
The final was played on 24 May 1995 at the Ernst Happel Stadion in Vienna, Austria.

24 May 1995
20:30

Ajax (Netherlands)	1–0	(Italy) Milan
Kluivert 85'	Report

Ernst-Happel-Stadion, Vienna
Attendance: 49,730
Referee: Ion Crăciunescu (Romania)
