= 1995 UEFA Champions League final =

Association football match

- Match programme cover
- Event: 1994–95 UEFA Champions League
Ajax	Milan
(Netherlands)	(Italy)
1	0
- Date: 24 May 1995
- Venue: Ernst-Happel-Stadion, Vienna
- Referee: Ion Crăciunescu (Romania)
- Attendance: 49,730

The 1995 UEFA Champions League final was an association football match played on 24 May 1995 at the Ernst-Happel-Stadion in Vienna, Austria, to determine the winners of the 1994–95 UEFA Champions League, the 40th season of Europe's premier club competition organised by UEFA. It was contested by Dutch side Ajax and title holders Milan of Italy in a rematch of the 1969 final. Milan were appearing in their third consecutive UEFA Champions League final, as well as aiming to win a sixth European Cup/UEFA Champions League title, which would have tied them with Real Madrid's record. However, after 85 minutes, Ajax striker Patrick Kluivert scored the only goal of the game to give Ajax their first title in 22 years and as of 2026 the most recent; at the age of 18 years, 327 days, that made him the youngest player to score in a UEFA Champions League final.

This final marked the first time in the tournament's history that players' names were printed on the back of the shirts along with the debut of the UEFA Champions League starball logo on the sleeves.

== Teams ==
In the following table, finals until 1992 were in the European Cup era, since 1993 were in the UEFA Champions League era.

Team	Previous finals appearances (bold indicates winners)
Ajax	4 (1969, **1971**, **1972**, **1973**)
Milan	7 (1958, **1963**, **1969**, **1989**, **1990**, 1993, **1994**)

== Route to the final ==
(Netherlands) Ajax				Round	(Italy) Milan			
Opponent	Result			Group stage	Opponent	Result		
(Italy) Milan	2–0 (H)			Matchday 1	(Netherlands) Ajax	0–2 (A)		
(Greece) AEK Athens	2–1 (A)			Matchday 2	(Austria) Casino Salzburg	3–0 (H)		
(Austria) Casino Salzburg	0–0 (A)			Matchday 3	(Greece) AEK Athens	0–0 (A)		
(Austria) Casino Salzburg	1–1 (H)			Matchday 4	(Greece) AEK Athens	2–1 (H)		
(Italy) Milan	2–0 (A)			Matchday 5	(Netherlands) Ajax	0–2 (H)		
(Greece) AEK Athens	2–0 (H)			Matchday 6	(Austria) Casino Salzburg	1–0 (A)		
**Group D winner**: Pos / Team / Pld / Pts; **1** / (Netherlands) Ajax / **6** / **10**; 2 / (Italy) Milan / 6 / **5**; 3 / (Austria) Casino Salzburg / 6 / **5**; 4 / (Greece) AEK Athens / 6 / **2**; Source: UEFA				Final standings	**Group D runners-up** (Note: Milan were docked two points for crowd trouble against Casino Salzburg on matchday 2.): Pos / Team / Pld / Pts; 1 / (Netherlands) Ajax / 6 / **10**; **2** / (Italy) Milan / **6** / **5**; 3 / (Austria) Casino Salzburg / 6 / **5**; 4 / (Greece) AEK Athens / 6 / **2**; Source: UEFA			
Opponent	Agg.	1st leg	2nd leg	Knockout phase	Opponent	Agg.	1st leg	2nd leg
(Croatia) Hajduk Split	3–0	0–0 (A)	3–0 (H)	Quarter-finals	(Portugal) Benfica	2–0	2–0 (H)	0–0 (A)
(Germany) Bayern Munich	5–2	0–0 (A)	5–2 (H)	Semi-finals	(France) Paris Saint-Germain	3–0	1–0 (A)	2–0 (H)

== Match ==
=== Details ===
24 May 1995
20:30 UTC+2

Ajax (Netherlands)	1–0	(Italy) Milan
Kluivert 85'	Report

Ernst-Happel-Stadion, Vienna
Attendance: 49,730
Referee: Ion Crăciunescu (Romania)

**Ajax**	**Milan**

GK	1	(Netherlands) Edwin van der Sar
RB	2	(Netherlands) Michael Reiziger
CB	3	(Netherlands) Danny Blind (c)	(yellow card) 44'
DM	4	(Netherlands) Frank Rijkaard
LB	5	(Netherlands) Frank de Boer
RM	6	(Netherlands) Clarence Seedorf		(substituted off) 53'
RF	7	(Nigeria) Finidi George
LM	8	(Netherlands) Edgar Davids
CF	9	(Netherlands) Ronald de Boer
AM	10	(Finland) Jari Litmanen		(substituted off) 70'
LF	11	(Netherlands) Marc Overmars	(yellow card) 33'
Substitutions:
GK	12	(Netherlands) Fred Grim
DF	13	(Netherlands) Winston Bogarde
FW	14	(Nigeria) Nwankwo Kanu		(substituted on) 53'
FW	15	(Netherlands) Patrick Kluivert		(substituted on) 70'
FW	16	(Netherlands) Peter van Vossen
Manager:
(Netherlands) Louis van Gaal

GK	1	(Italy) Sebastiano Rossi
RB	2	(Italy) Christian Panucci
CB	5	(Italy) Alessandro Costacurta
CB	6	(Italy) Franco Baresi (c)
LB	3	(Italy) Paolo Maldini
DM	4	(Italy) Demetrio Albertini
DM	8	(France) Marcel Desailly
RM	7	(Italy) Roberto Donadoni
LM	10	(Croatia) Zvonimir Boban	(substituted off) 84'
SS	11	(Italy) Marco Simone
CF	9	(Italy) Daniele Massaro	(substituted off) 88'
Substitutions:
GK	12	(Italy) Mario Ielpo
CB	13	(Italy) Filippo Galli
RM	14	(Italy) Stefano Eranio	(substituted on) 88'
RM	15	(Italy) Gianluigi Lentini	(substituted on) 84'
CM	16	(Italy) Giovanni Stroppa
Manager:
(Italy) Fabio Capello

Linesmen:
Nicolae Grigorescu (Romania)
Tudor Constantinescu (Romania)
Fourth official:
Adrian Porumboiu (Romania)

== See also ==
- 1969 European Cup final – contested by the same teams
- 1995 UEFA Super Cup
- 1995 UEFA Cup Winners' Cup final
- 1995 UEFA Cup final
- 1994–95 AC Milan season
- 1994–95 AFC Ajax season
- AC Milan in international football
- AFC Ajax in international football
