= Erlingmark =

Erlingmark is a surname. Notable people with the surname include:

- August Erlingmark (born 1998), Swedish footballer
- Magnus Erlingmark (born 1968), Swedish footballer, father of August
