= Nwankwo Kanu =

Nigerian footballer (born 1976)

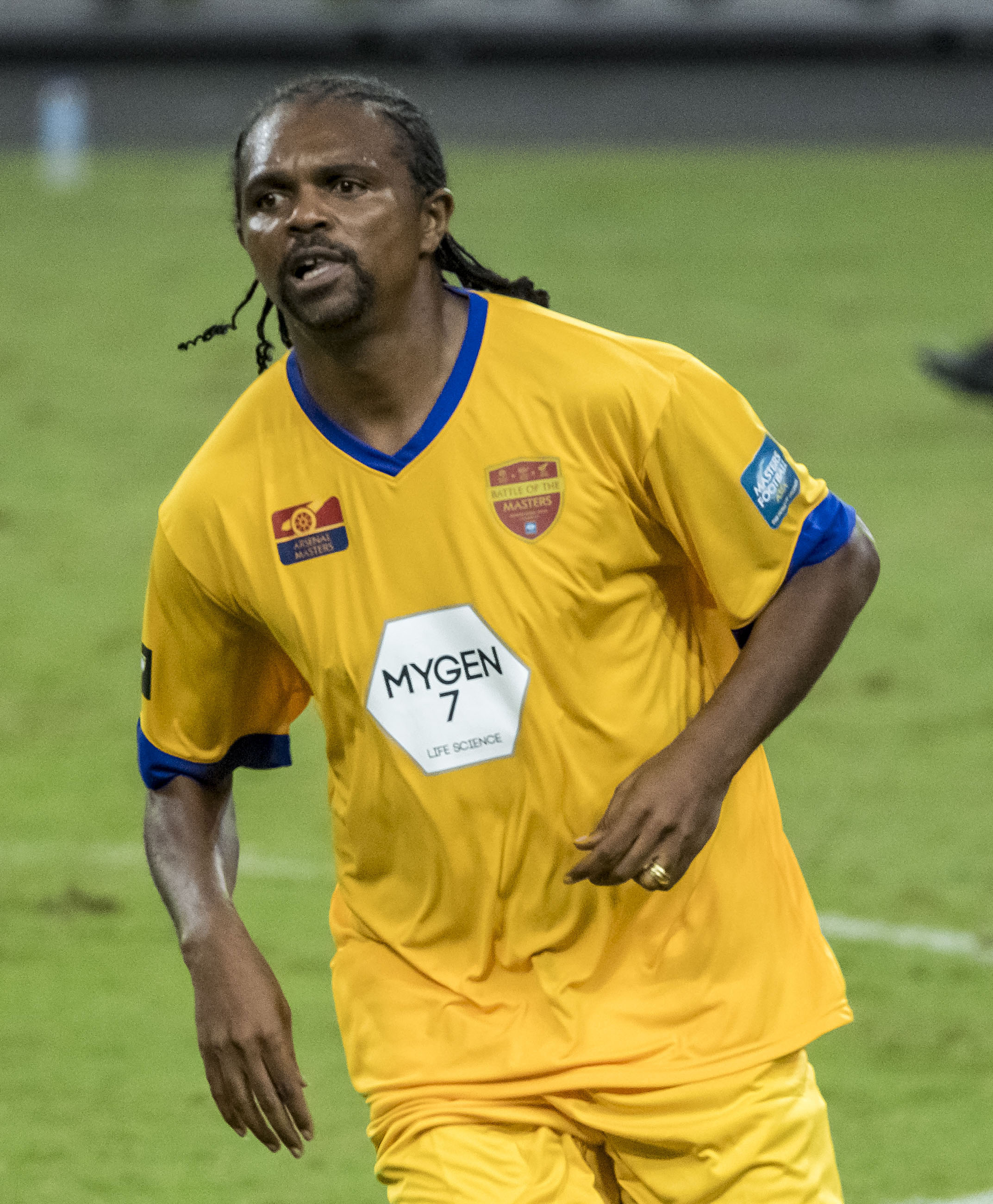
- Kanu in a friendly in 2017

Personal information
- Full name: Nwankwo Christian Kanu
- Date of birth: 1 August 1976 (age 50)
- Place of birth: Owerri, Imo State, Nigeria
- Height: 1.97 m (6 ft 6 in)
- Position: Forward

Youth career
- –1992: Federation Works

Senior career*
Years	Team	Apps	(Gls)
1992–1993	Iwuanyanwu Nationale	25	(15)
1993–1996	Ajax	54	(25)
1996–1999	Inter Milan	12	(1)
1999–2004	Arsenal	119	(30)
2004–2006	West Bromwich Albion	53	(7)
2006–2012	Portsmouth	143	(20)
Total		406	(98)

International career
1993	Nigeria U17	6	(5)
1996	Nigeria U23	6	(3)
1994–2011	Nigeria	86	(12)
Medal record
Men's Football
Representing Nigeria
Olympic Games
Winner	1996 Atlanta
Africa Cup of Nations
Runner-up	2000
FIFA U-17 World Cup
Winner	1993
- * Club domestic league appearances and goals

Nwankwo Christian Kanu (born 1 August 1976) is a Nigerian former professional footballer who played as a forward. A member of the Arsenal 'Invincibles', Kanu is widely regarded as one of the greatest Arsenal players in history and one of the greatest African footballers of all time.

He was a member of the Nigeria national team, and played for Iwuanyanwu Nationale in his native Nigeria. Kanu also played for Ajax and Inter Milan before spending the rest of his career in England, playing for Arsenal, West Bromwich Albion and Portsmouth.

Kanu won a UEFA Champions League medal, an Intercontinental Cup, two Premier League titles, three Eredivisie, three FA Cup medals and two African Player of the Year awards amongst others. He is one of few players to have won the Premier League, FA Cup, Champions League, and an Olympic gold medal.

He is also a UNICEF Goodwill Ambassador, and African brand ambassador for digital TV operator StarTimes.

== Early life ==
Nwankwo Christian Kanu was born on 1 August 1976 in Owerri, Imo State.

== Club career ==
=== Early career ===
Kanu began his career at local side Federation Works before moving to Iwuanyanwu Nationale. After a notable performance in Nigeria's victorious U-17 World Championship campaign, he was signed by Dutch giants Ajax in 1993 for an undisclosed fee. He made his Ajax debut that year and went on to score 25 goals in 54 appearances. Kanu also came on as a sub in Ajax's 1995 UEFA Champions League final 1–0 win over AC Milan. The next year, Ajax reached the final again, but lost to Juventus on penalties. Kanu started and played the entirety of that match.

=== Inter Milan ===
In 1996, Ajax sold Kanu to Serie A side Inter Milan for around $4.7 million. That summer he captained the Nigeria national team that won gold at the Olympics, and scored two late goals in the semi-finals against powerhouses Brazil to overturn a 2–3 scoreline into a 4–3 win in extra time. Kanu was also named African Footballer of the Year for that year.

However, soon after returning from the Olympics, Kanu underwent a medical examination at Inter, which revealed a serious heart defect, and it was believed by doctors that his career was over. Inter could have resolved the contract for not having passed the medical test, but instead Inter president Massimo Moratti decided to keep the player and paid for the risky operation in the best clinic for chirurgical heart operations in Cleveland to replace an aortic valve caused by an innate malformation.

He underwent successful surgery in November and did not return to his club until April 1997. In interviews, Kanu frequently cites his faith as a Christian, and to be grateful to Moratti, he has often mentioned this trying time of his career as an occasion when he prayed to God. Kanu's experience also led to his founding the Kanu Heart Foundation, an organisation that helps predominantly young African children who suffer heart defects and whose work was expanded to provide aid for homeless children in 2008.

=== Arsenal ===
In February 1999, after just twelve league games and one goal for Inter, Kanu was signed by Arsenal for approximately £4.15 million. He made his debut for Arsenal, against Sheffield United in the FA Cup. With the score 1–1 and ten minutes to go, the Sheffield United goalkeeper Alan Kelly kicked the ball out of touch so that treatment could be given to Lee Morris. When the ball was thrown back into play by Ray Parlour, although it was intended for Kelly, Kanu chased the throw-in down the right wing unchallenged and centered the ball for Marc Overmars, who scored to make the match 2–1. After the match, Arsenal manager Arsène Wenger accepted that it was not correct sportsmanship and offered to re-play the match which was again won by Arsenal.

Despite the events overshadowing his debut, Kanu's career was quickly revived at Arsenal. He scored his first goal for the club in the next round of the cup against Derby County, coming off the bench to net the only goal of the game. He quickly became known for his goal scoring prowess from the bench, scoring important goals against Sheffield Wednesday, Tottenham Hotspur and Aston Villa as a substitute. He became very popular among the fans for his two-fingered salute which started in 1999 against Middlesbrough – something that he later explained was based on the team's nickname, The Gunners.

Kanu was named African Footballer of the Year for the second time in 1999. In the 1999–2000 season, he scored 17 times in 50 matches for the Gunners, including a hat-trick in fifteen minutes against Chelsea in October 1999 to turn a 2–0 deficit into a 3–2 victory. In August 2001, Arsenal rejected a bid from Fulham of around £7m for Kanu. However, Kanu's appearances for Arsenal gradually became less frequent, particularly after the emergence of Thierry Henry as Arsenal's first choice striker with Kanu being mainly used as a substitute. Kanu then won the 2003 FA Cup with Arsenal. Along with other famous players, such as Henry and Robert Pires, Kanu is a member of the "Invincibles", the Arsenal side that finished the 2003–04 season of the Premier League undefeated. He played 197 games for Arsenal, scoring 44 goals. In the summer of 2004, after his contract with Arsenal ended, he moved to West Bromwich Albion on a free transfer. In 2008, Kanu was voted 13th in the "Gunners' Greatest 50 Players" poll.

In the summer of 2006, Kanu played as a guest for Arsenal in Dennis Bergkamp's testimonial game, the first match to be played in Arsenal's new Emirates Stadium. The game was tied 1–1 when Kanu scored the winning goal, making him the third person to score in the stadium. At the end of the match, Kanu joined the rest of the Arsenal side in hoisting the retired Dutchman on their shoulders as fans gave him a standing ovation. He remains a popular figure at Arsenal, being applauded when he appears at the Emirates Stadium. During his time with the club, he wore the number 25 shirt.

=== West Bromwich Albion ===
West Bromwich Albion had just been promoted to the Premier League for the second time in the space of two years. Kanu started as a regular for the club, making his debut in a 1–1 draw away at Blackburn Rovers on 14 August 2004. He scored his first goal for Albion on 18 September 2004, an 88th-minute equalizer in a 1–1 home draw against Fulham. In a match against Middlesbrough on 14 November 2004, Kanu was guilty of an incredible miss in injury time, with Albion 2–1 down. Kanu had sent a low cross over the bar from a yard away from the goal line. Manager Bryan Robson was seen in TV footage mouthing the words "How did he miss that?", and Kanu's howler was crowned "Miss of the Season" by many media outlets in their end-of-season reviews. Nevertheless, the 2004–05 season was ultimately a memorable one for West Bromwich Albion, as they became the first club to avoid relegation from the Premier League after being bottom of the table at Christmas.

One of the most memorable games of the 2005–06 season for Kanu came with the visit of his former club Arsenal to The Hawthorns on 15 October 2005. Philippe Senderos put the visitors ahead in the 17th minute, but Kanu equalised shortly before half time. West Brom went on to win the match 2–1 with a spectacular strike from Darren Carter. It was their first home win over Arsenal since 1973, and the first time that they had come from behind to win a Premier League game. But such highlights were rare for Albion that season, and the club was relegated at the end of 2005–06. Kanu's contract had expired, and he chose not to renew it. In his two years at The Hawthorns he made a total of 58 appearances – 16 of them as a substitute – and scored nine goals.

=== Portsmouth ===
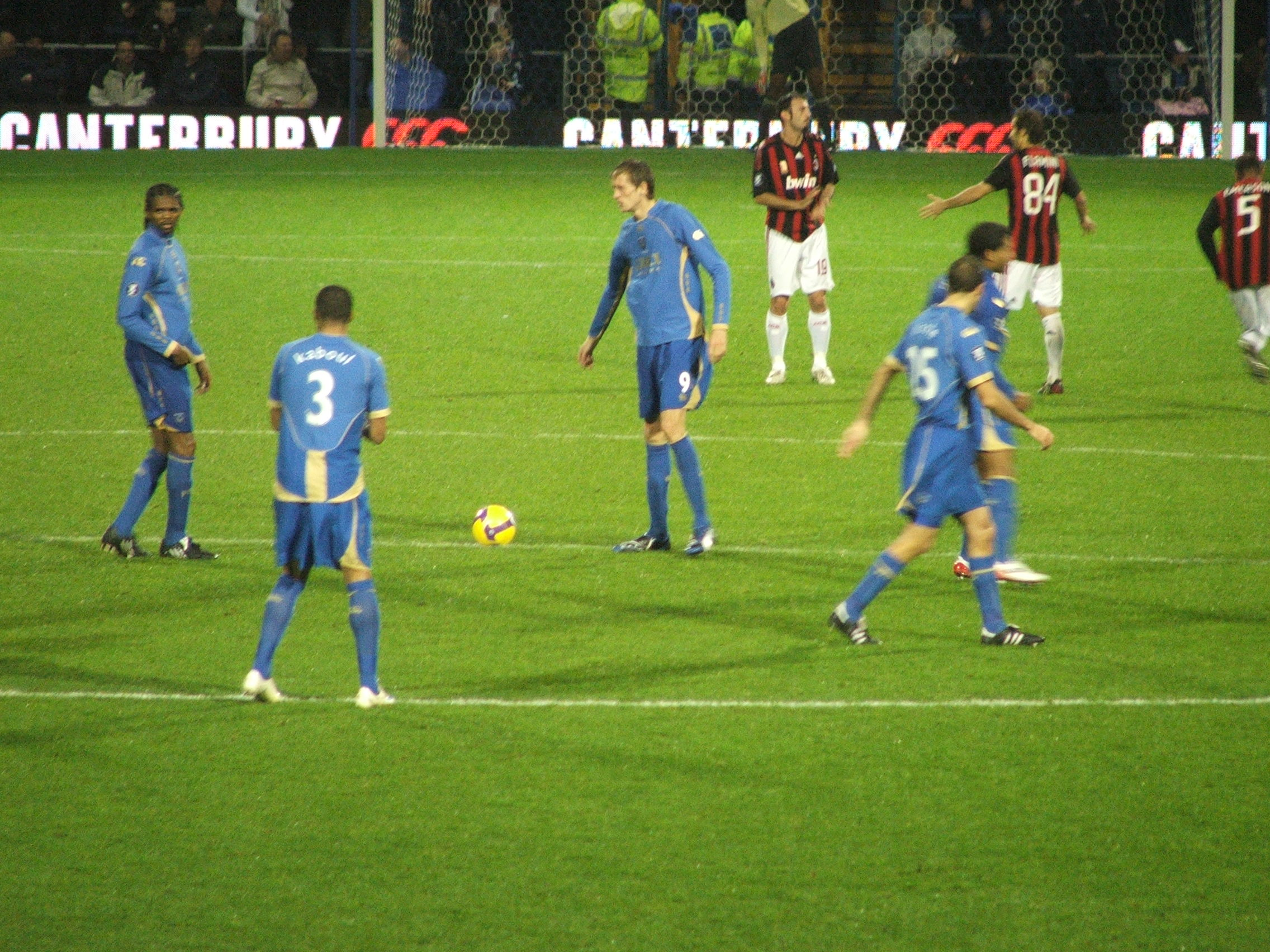
Kanu (left) playing for Portsmouth in 2008

Kanu was a free agent following his departure from West Brom, and he signed for Portsmouth on a one-year deal shortly before the start of the 2006–07 season. Pompey had undergone a revival in the second half of the previous campaign, following the return of Harry Redknapp as manager, avoiding relegation by four points after being in serious danger at the turn of the year. At the start of the 2006–07 season, they were undefeated in their first five games, during which they did not concede a single goal. Kanu made his debut for Portsmouth as a substitute against Blackburn Rovers on 19 August 2006, the opening day of the 2006–07 Premier League season. He scored twice and missed a penalty. Kanu went on to finish the season as the top goal scorer for Portsmouth, with 12 goals altogether. He then signed a new one-year deal with the club.

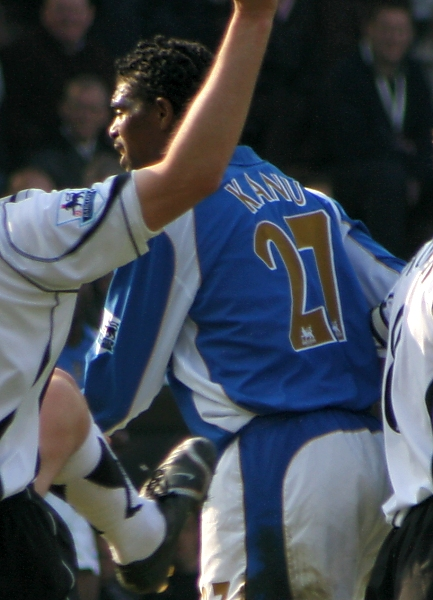
Kanu playing for Portsmouth in 2007

In his second season at Portsmouth, Kanu scored in both the FA Cup 1–0 semi-final win against West Bromwich Albion and the 1–0 win in the final against Cardiff City, earning him a third FA Cup winner's medal.

His first goal of the 2008–09 season put Portsmouth 2–0 up in their eventual 2–2 UEFA Cup draw with Italian club AC Milan. He later scored the winning goal against Bolton Wanderers, which ensured Pompey's safety. It was his only Premier League goal of 2008–09. He re-signed with Pompey in August 2010, with an eye on becoming a coach when he retired. Kanu signed a three-year deal and kept the number 27 shirt, but was not a regular starter throughout the course of the season and only managed two goals.

During the 2011–12 season, his playing time was reduced, appearing only from the bench. After the departure of Steve Cotterill, and the arrival of Michael Appleton, he was also removed from the bench, due to fitness and injury problems. By May 2012, aided by a point deduction for entering administration Portsmouth had found themselves in a relegation battle which eventually ended in them relegated to League One. To cut costs the Administrator hoped to reach agreement to terminate the contracts of Kanu along with six other players due to them being the highest-earning players at the club. On 9 July 2012, it was announced that Kanu and Aaron Mokoena were expected to leave the club after failing to attend the first day back at pre-season training. Kanu threatened to sue Portsmouth for unpaid back wages. On 30 July, Kanu agreed to leave Portsmouth, but he reiterated that he was still in a dispute over the unpaid wages that the club owed him. In April 2013 he confirmed that he had dropped the case and let the club off the £3 million he claimed he was owed.

== International career ==
Kanu was a member of the Nigeria national team from 1994 to 2011, making his debut in a friendly against Sweden. Earlier on at the start of his career, Kanu was instrumental in Nigeria's overall success at the 1993 FIFA U-17 World Championship in Japan and their subsequent 2–1 victory over Ghana in the final. With five goals, he was the second joint-scorer in the tournament with Peter Anosike and Manuel Neira, behind compatriot and captain Wilson Oruma.

As well as winning the Olympic gold in the football event at the 1996 Olympics in Atlanta, where he scored the winning goal in the 4–3 semi-final win over Brazil, his second goal of the match, Kanu participated at the 1998 and 2002 FIFA World Cups. On 24 June 2010, Kanu ended his international career following Nigeria's exit from the 2010 World Cup in South Africa. The Super Eagles lost their group matches against Argentina and Greece, before drawing 2–2 with South Korea. He won 86 caps and scored 13 goals for his country and was the joint most capped Nigerian player of all-time alongside Muda Lawal, until Joseph Yobo surpassed both players in 2012, winning his 87th cap. Despite being a striker, he wore the number 4 shirt for the national team.

== Player profile ==
Despite his physical strength, slender frame, and large stature of 1.97 m (6 ft 6 in), Kanu was a talented player, who was quick and elegant in possession, and who possessed an excellent touch on the ball and nimble footwork; he was also highly regarded in the media for his technical skills, dribbling ability, and close control, as well as his flair and use of feints, which made him an unpredictable player on the pitch. He was also an intelligent player, who possessed good vision and movement, as well as being a good passer, who had the ability to read the game and an eye for the final ball, which – along with his timing and finishing ability – allowed him both to score and create goals; however, he also lacked significant pace, and drew criticism at times in the media over his work-rate, "languid" playing style, and occasional tendency to miss easy goalscoring opportunities.

Although he was often deployed as a striker, his creativity also allowed him to operate in a more withdrawn attacking role behind or supporting the main striker, or even in an advanced playmaking role. Although his height made him a strong presence in the air, he was more adept at scoring with his feet than with his head, despite his size, although he improved upon his aerial game in his later career. He was also known for his determination and ability to hold-up the ball with his back to goal. Moreover, his ability to score decisive goals when coming off the bench earned him a reputation as a "super-sub" in the media during his time with Arsenal. However, despite being a gifted player, he was also known for being inconsistent, and his congenital heart defect is thought to have had a negative impact on his career and fitness, although he was able to improve his stamina following corrective surgery through his training. He is considered by pundits to be one of the greatest African players of all time, and by some, as the greatest Nigerian player ever.

== Personal life ==
Kanu is a native of Abia State, southeast Nigeria, and a member of the Aro sub-group of the Igbo ethnic group. Nwankwo means "Child born on Nkwo market day" in the Igbo language.

Kanu's younger brother, Christopher, was also a footballer, who played as a defender; he also has another younger brother, Ogbonna. Kanu is a Christian.

Kanu was born with a congenital heart defect, which impeded his aortic valve from closing properly; it was discovered and operated on in 1996. Although it was feared that he would not play again, and that it would affect his career, he made a full recovery. He undergoes an annual medical check-up for the condition. In March 2014, he successfully underwent corrective heart surgery once again, in the United States.

== Philanthropy ==
Kanu's own experience with a congenital heart defect moved him to set up the "Kanu Heart Foundation" in 2000, a foundation which aims to tackle homelessness, and which also built five hospitals in Africa to treat children with undiagnosed heart disease and provide them surgery.

The Kanu Heart Foundation has spent about $4.2 million, an average of $10,000.00 per person, on surgeries outside Nigeria. Tackling homelessness in Africa, Kanu Heart Foundation has to date funded the construction of five hospitals across the continent to treat children with undiagnosed heart disease and provide them life-changing medical care.

== Career statistics ==
=== Club ===
Appearances and goals by club, season and competition
Club	Season	League			National Cup		League Cup		Continental		Other		Total	
Club	Season	Division	Apps	Goals	Apps	Goals	Apps	Goals	Apps	Goals	Apps	Goals	Apps	Goals
Iwuanyanwu Nationale	1992–93	Nigerian Premier League	25	15							–		25	15
Ajax	1993–94	Eredivisie	6	2	0	0	–				–		6	2
Ajax	1994–95	Eredivisie	18	10	1	1	–		7 (Note: Appearances in UEFA Champions League)	1	–		26	12
Ajax	1995–96	Eredivisie	30	13	0	0	–		9	0	3 (Note: One appearance in 1995 Intercontinental Cup, one appearance in 1995 UEFA Super Cup, one appearance in 1995 Dutch Supercup)	0	42	13
Ajax	Total		54	25	1	1	0	0	16	1	3	0	74	27
Inter Milan	1996–97	Serie A	0	0			–		0	0	–		0	0
Inter Milan	1997–98	Serie A	11	1	2	0	–		5 (Note: Appearances in UEFA Cup)	0	–		18	1
Inter Milan	1998–99	Serie A	1	0	1	0	–				–		2	0
Inter Milan	Total		12	1	3	0	0	0	5	0	0	0	20	1
Arsenal	1998–99	Premier League	12	6	5	1	0	0	0	0	–		17	7
Arsenal	1999–2000	Premier League	31	12	2	0	1	1	15 (Note: Appearances in UEFA Champions League and UEFA Cup)	3	1 (Note: One appearance in 1999 FA Charity Shield)	1	50	17
Arsenal	2000–01	Premier League	27	3	1	0	0	0	14	2	–		42	5
Arsenal	2001–02	Premier League	23	3	5	2	2	1	9	0	–		39	6
Arsenal	2002–03	Premier League	16	5	1	0	1	0	8	1	–		26	6
Arsenal	2003–04	Premier League	10	1	3	0	4	2	7	0	–		24	3
Arsenal	Total		119	30	17	3	8	4	53	6	1	1	198	44
West Bromwich Albion	2004–05	Premier League	28	2	2	1	0	0	–		–		30	3
West Bromwich Albion	2005–06	Premier League	25	5	1	0	2	1	–		–		28	6
West Bromwich Albion	Total		53	7	3	1	2	1	0	0	0	0	58	9
Portsmouth	2006–07	Premier League	36	10	2	2	0	0	–		–		38	12
Portsmouth	2007–08	Premier League	25	4	5	2	1	1	–		–		31	7
Portsmouth	2008–09	Premier League	17	1	2	0	1	0	5	1	–		25	2
Portsmouth	2009–10	Premier League	23	2	1	0	4	2	–		–		28	4
Portsmouth	2010–11	Championship	32	2	1	0	1	0	–		–		34	2
Portsmouth	2011–12	Championship	10	1	0	0	1	0	–		–		11	1
Portsmouth	Total		143	20	11	4	8	3	5	1	0	0	167	28
Career total			406	98	35	9	18	8	79	8	4	1	542	124

=== International ===
Appearances and goals by national team and year
National team	Year	Apps	Goals
Nigeria	1994	3	0
Nigeria	1995	2	1
Nigeria	1996	0	0
Nigeria	1997	1	0
Nigeria	1998	5	1
Nigeria	1999	0	0
Nigeria	2000	10	1
Nigeria	2001	6	2
Nigeria	2002	11	0
Nigeria	2003	4	3
Nigeria	2004	7	0
Nigeria	2005	6	2
Nigeria	2006	8	0
Nigeria	2007	6	2
Nigeria	2008	6	0
Nigeria	2009	5	0
Nigeria	2010	5	0
Nigeria	2011	1	0
Total		86	12

Scores and results list Nigeria's goal tally first, score column indicates score after each Kanu goal.

List of international goals scored by Nwankwo Kanu
No.	Date	Venue	Opponent	Score	Result	Competition
1	21 October 1995	Pakhtakor Markaziy Stadium, Tashkent, Uzbekistan	Uzbekistan	3–1	3–2	1995 Afro-Asian Cup of Nations
2	5 June 1998	Amsterdam Arena, Amsterdam, Netherlands	Netherlands	1–3	1–5	Friendly
3	22 April 2000	Lagos National Stadium, Lagos, Nigeria	Eritrea	4–0	4–0	2002 FIFA World Cup qualification
4	27 January 2001	Liberation Stadium, Port Harcourt, Nigeria	Sudan	3–0	3–0	2002 FIFA World Cup qualification
5	5 May 2001	Liberation Stadium, Port Harcourt, Nigeria	Liberia	1–0	2–0	2002 FIFA World Cup qualification
6	25 May 2003	Independence Park, Kingston, Jamaica	Jamaica	2–2	2–3	Friendly
7	7 June 2003	Abuja Stadium, Abuja, Nigeria	Malawi	3–1	4–1	2004 African Cup of Nations qualification
8	7 June 2003	Abuja Stadium, Abuja, Nigeria	Malawi	4–1	4–1	2004 African Cup of Nations qualification
9	26 March 2005	Liberation Stadium, Port Harcourt, Nigeria	Gabon	2–0	2–0	2006 FIFA World Cup qualification
10	8 October 2005	Abuja Stadium, Abuja, Nigeria	Zimbabwe	4–1	5–1	2006 FIFA World Cup qualification
11	24 March 2007	MKO Abiola Stadium, Abeokuta, Nigeria	Uganda	1–0	1–0	2008 Africa Cup of Nations qualification
12	17 June 2007	Stade Général Seyni Kountché, Niamey, Niger	Niger	1–0	3–1	2008 Africa Cup of Nations qualification

== Honours ==
Iwuanyanwu Nationale

- Nigerian Premier League: 1992–93

Ajax

- Eredivisie: 1993–94, 1994–95, 1995–96
- UEFA Champions League: 1994–95; runner-up: 1995–96
- UEFA Super Cup: 1995
- Intercontinental Cup: 1995

Inter Milan

- UEFA Cup: 1997–98

Arsenal

- Premier League: 2001–02, 2003–04
- FA Cup: 2001–02, 2002–03; runner-up: 2000–01
- FA Charity Shield: 1999
- UEFA Cup runner-up: 1999–2000

Portsmouth

- FA Cup: 2007–08; runner-up: 2009–10

Nigeria U17

- FIFA U-17 World Championship: 1993

Nigeria U23

- Summer Olympics: 1996

Nigeria

- Afro-Asian Cup of Nations: 1995
- African Cup of Nations runner-up: 2000
- African Cup of Nations Bronze: 2002, 2004, 2006, 2008

Individual

- Ajax Talent of the Year (Marco van Basten Award): 1994–95
- African Footballer of the Year: 1996, 1999
- BBC African Footballer of the Year: 1997, 1999
- FA Cup final Man of the Match: 2008
- IFFHS Legends
- IFFHS All-time Africa Men's Dream Team: 2021
