= Leo Koswal =

Dutch footballer

Leo Koswal (born 13 October 1975) is a Dutch former professional footballer who played as a forward. He made his Eredivisie debut with club FC Dordrecht during the 1994–95 season. Koswal also played for clubs Vitesse Arnhem, MVV Maastricht, TOP Oss, FC Emmen, and SBV Excelsior.
