= Magnus Erlingmark =

Swedish footballer (born 1968)

Personal information
- Full name: Per Magnus Erlingmark
- Date of birth: 8 July 1968 (age 58)
- Place of birth: Jönköping, Sweden
- Height: 1.88 m (6 ft 2 in)
- Position: Defensive midfielder

Youth career
- –1984: BK Forward

Senior career*
Years	Team	Apps	(Gls)
1985–1988	BK Forward	71	(10)
1989–1992	Örebro SK	102	(11)
1993–2004	IFK Göteborg	278	(42)
2005	BK Häcken	0	(0)
Total		451	(63)

International career
1989–1990	Sweden U21	10	(1)
1990–1998	Sweden	37	(1)
Medal record
Sweden
FIFA World Cup
Bronze medal – third place	1994
- * Club domestic league appearances and goals

Per Magnus Erlingmark (born 8 July 1968) is a Swedish former professional footballer who mainly played as a defensive midfielder. A prime example of a utility player in football, he is best known for his time with IFK Göteborg with which he won four Allsvenskan titles between 1993 and 2004. A full international between 1990 and 1998, he made 37 appearances for the Sweden national team and appeared at two international tournaments: UEFA Euro 1992 on home soil and the 1994 FIFA World Cup, where Sweden finished third.

== Club career ==
=== Early career ===
Erlingmark started off his career with BK Forward before signing with the Allsvenskan club Örebro SK in 1989. After having appeared in more than 100 Allsvenskan games for Örebro, he signed with IFK Göteborg ahead of the 1993 Allsvenskan season.

=== IFK Göteborg ===
Erlingmark helped IFK Göteborg to four straight Allsvenskan titles between 1993 and 1996. His most memorable time with the club came during the 1994–95 UEFA Champions League season, where he helped Göteborg win their group ahead of FC Barcelona, Manchester United, and Galatasaray by scoring four goals. He played a total of 471 games for the club from 1993 until his retirement in 2004.

=== BK Häcken ===
Erlingmark came out of his retirement ahead of the 2005 Allsvenskan and signed for BK Häcken as a back-up player, but never appeared in any competitive game during his lone season with the club.

== International career ==
=== Youth ===
Erlingmark represented the Sweden U21 team at the 1990 UEFA European Under-21 Championship where Sweden reached the semi-finals before being eliminated by the Soviet Union. He appeared a total of 10 times for the Swedish U21 team and scored one goal.

=== Senior ===
Erlingmark made his senior debut for the Sweden national team in a friendly game against the United Arab Emirates which ended in a 1–2 loss for Sweden. On 17 April 1991, he scored his first international goal for Sweden in a friendly 2–2 draw with Greece.

He was a squad player for Sweden at UEFA Euro 1992 in which Sweden progressed to the semi-finals, and made his only appearance in the tournament as a substitute for Anders Limpar in a 1–0 group stage win against the eventual UEFA Euro 1992 champions Denmark. Two years later, Erlingmark represented Sweden at the 1994 FIFA World Cup in which Sweden finished third. He made his only appearance in the tournament coming in as a substitute for Joachim Björklund in a 3–1 group stage win against Russia.

Erlingmark played his last international game on 14 October 1998, coming on as a late substitute in a UEFA Euro 2000 qualifier against Bulgaria, which Sweden won 1–0. He won a total of 37 caps for Sweden between 1990 and 1998, scoring one goal.

== Personal life ==
He is the father of professional footballer August Erlingmark.

== Career statistics ==
=== Club ===
Appearances and goals by club, season and competition
Club	Season	League			Svenska Cupen		Other*		Total	
Club	Season	Division	Apps	Goals	Apps	Goals	Apps	Goals	Apps	Goals
BK Forward	1985	Division 3 Västra Svealand	3	0					3	0
BK Forward	1986	Division 3 Västra Svealand	18	4					18	4
BK Forward	1987	Division 1 Norra	26	2					26	2
BK Forward	1988	Division 1 Norra	24	4					24	4
BK Forward	Total		71	10					71	10
Örebro SK	1989	Allsvenskan	22	2					22	2
Örebro SK	1990	Allsvenskan	22	2					22	2
Örebro SK	1991	Allsvenskan	27	4					27	4
Örebro SK	1992	Allsvenskan	31	3					31	3
Örebro SK	Total		102	11					102	11
IFK Göteborg	1993	Allsvenskan	19	9	3	3	0	0	22	12
IFK Göteborg	1994	Allsvenskan	25	9	1	0	8	4	34	13
IFK Göteborg	1995	Allsvenskan	26	5	6	5	4	0	36	10
IFK Göteborg	1996	Allsvenskan	22	6	7	2	7	2	36	10
IFK Göteborg	1997	Allsvenskan	24	0	3	3	7	0	34	3
IFK Göteborg	1998	Allsvenskan	23	2	4	1	4	0	31	3
IFK Göteborg	1999	Allsvenskan	26	1	8	1	6	0	40	2
IFK Göteborg	2000	Allsvenskan	20	1	5	1	0	0	25	2
IFK Göteborg	2001	Allsvenskan	24	3	3	0	0	0	27	3
IFK Göteborg	2002	Allsvenskan	25	2	3	0	4	0	32	2
IFK Göteborg	2003	Allsvenskan	25	2	3	0	0	0	28	2
IFK Göteborg	2004	Allsvenskan	19	2	3	0	2	0	24	2
IFK Göteborg	Total		278	42	49	16	42	6	369	64
BK Häcken	2005	Allsvenskan	0	0	0	0	–		0	0
Career total			451	63	49	16	42	6	542	85

*Appearance(s) in the UEFA Champions League, the UEFA Cup, Allsvenskan qualifiers, and Svenska Mästerskapsserien.

=== International ===
Appearances and goals by national team and year
National team	Year	Apps	Goals
Sweden	1990	5	0
Sweden	1991	8	1
Sweden	1992	6	0
Sweden	1993	0	0
Sweden	1994	7	0
Sweden	1995	5	0
Sweden	1996	3	0
Sweden	1997	0	0
Sweden	1998	3	0
Total		37	1

Scores and results list Sweden's goal tally first, score column indicates score after each Erlingmark goal.

List of international goals scored by Magnus Erlingmark
No.	Date	Venue	Opponent	Score	Result	Competition	Ref.
1	17 April 1991	Nikos Goumas Stadium, Athens, Greece	Greece	1–1	2–2	Friendly	

== Honours ==
BK Forward

- Division 3 Västra Svealand: 1986

IFK Göteborg

- Allsvenskan: 1993, 1994, 1995, 1996

Sweden

- FIFA World Cup third place: 1994

Individual

- Stor Grabb: 1994
- Årets ärkeängel: 1997
