= 1994–95 UEFA Champions League =

European football tournament

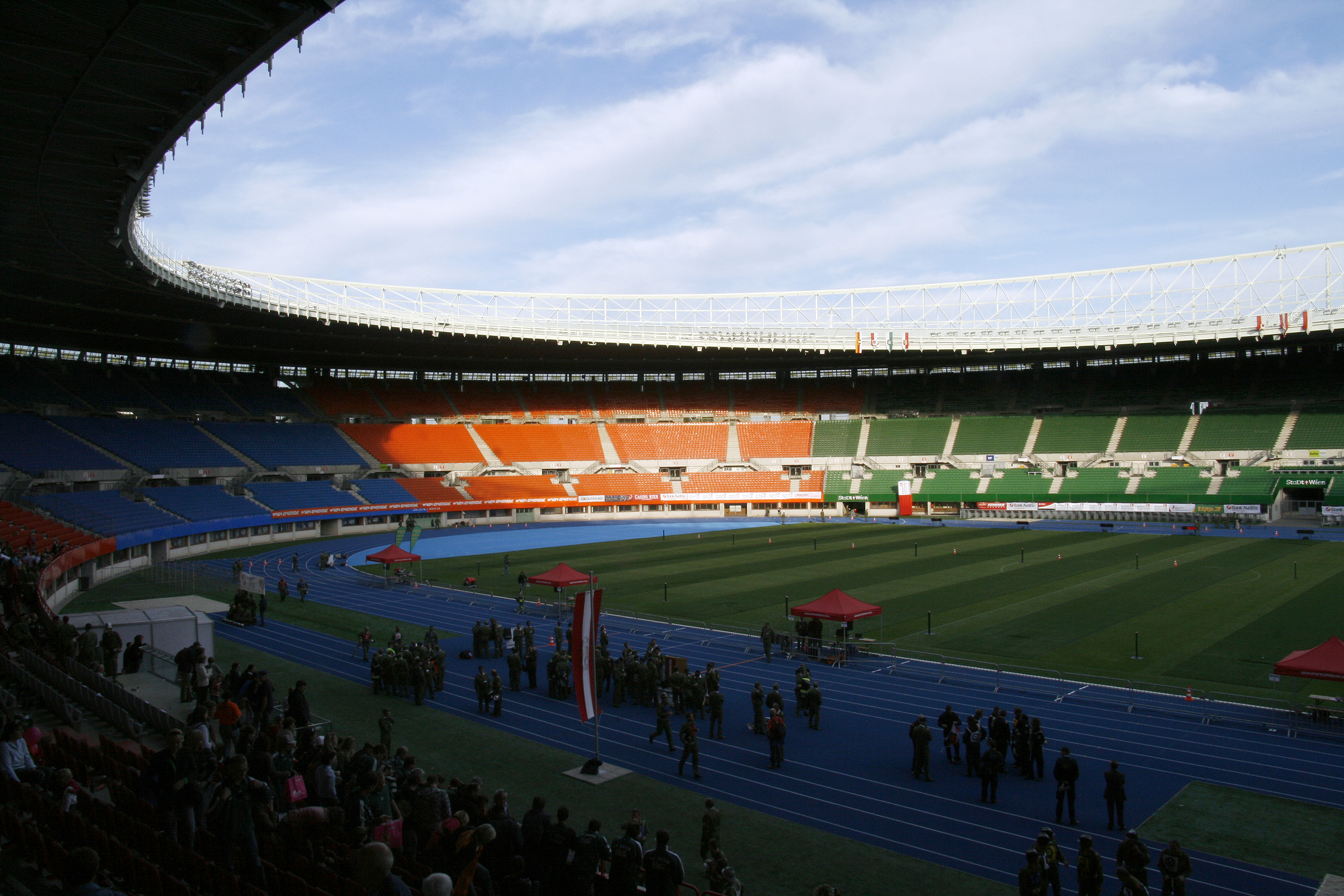
- The Ernst-Happel-Stadion in Vienna held the final.

Tournament details
- Dates: Qualifying: 10–24 August 1994; Competition proper: 14 September 1994 – 24 May 1995
- Teams: Competition proper: 16; Total: 24

Final positions
- Champions: (Netherlands) Ajax (4th title)
- Runners-up: (Italy) Milan

Tournament statistics
- Matches played: 61
- Goals scored: 140 (2.3 per match)
- Attendance: 2,328,515 (38,172 per match)
- Top scorer(s): George Weah (Paris Saint-Germain); 7 goals

The 1994–95 UEFA Champions League was the 40th edition of UEFA's premier European club football tournament, and the third since its rebranding as the UEFA Champions League. The tournament was won by Ajax of the Netherlands with a late goal in the final against defending champions Milan of Italy. Ajax won the competition without losing a game, either in the group or the knock-out stage, clinching the title for the first time since 1973.

Compared to the previous edition of the European Cup, radical changes were made to the format of the tournament, due to a recently expired contract that bound UEFA to the EBU for the transmission of the final. This gave occasion for a general review of the format, which attracted the interest of new and financially well-off private television companies. This edition included four groups of four teams each in the group stage, up from two groups of four teams each in 1993–94. It was also the first year in which eight teams advanced to the knock-out stage and the first of three years in which the champions of smaller nations entered the UEFA Cup instead of the Champions League. It was also the first time that this competition was known as the UEFA Champions League from the first to the last match of the competition: in two previous seasons, the UEFA Champions League involved the matches played between the second round and the European Cup final.

Federal Republic of Yugoslavia's entrants were unable to participate for the third season in a row due to the UN economic sanctions. Milan were the defending champions, but were defeated by Ajax in the final.

UEFA allowed official sponsor patches on shirts for the first time.

== Teams ==
24 teams entered the competition: the UEFA Champions League holders, Milan, who also won their domestic league, as well as the 23 best-ranked national champions according to the 1994 UEFA club seeding coefficients. The title holders and the other 7 best-ranked national champions received a bye to the group stage, while the national champions ranked 9–24 entered in the qualifying round. The remaining national champions were only allowed to participate in the 1994–95 UEFA Cup.

=== Distribution ===
Round	Teams entering in this round	Teams advancing from the previous round
Qualifying round (16 teams)	16 champions ranked 9–24 by seeding coefficient	
Group stage (16 teams)	8 champions ranked 1–8 by seeding coefficient (including title holders)	8 winners from the qualifying round
Knockout stage (8 teams)		4 group winners from the group stage; 4 group runners-up from the group stage

Since the title holders (Milan) qualified via their domestic league and club seeding coefficient, the title holder spot was vacated and the following changes to the default access list were made:

- The champions ranked 8th (Anderlecht) were promoted from the qualifying round to the group stage.
- The champions ranked 24th (Avenir Beggen) were promoted from the UEFA Cup preliminary round to the Champions League qualifying round.

=== Ranking ===
The teams were ranked according to their 1995 UEFA seeding coefficients, which took into account performances in European competitions from 1989–90 to 1993–94. Each club and national association had a seeding coefficient calculated (total points divided by total matches), with clubs taking the higher of these values as their final coefficient. This ranking then determined the competition (Champions League or UEFA Cup) and round (group stage or qualifying round) the teams would enter. Therefore, which associations had a participating team in the 1994–95 Champions League was partially dependent upon which club won the national championship.

Key to colours
Teams ranked 1 to 24 qualified
Teams ranked 25 and below did not qualify

Ranking of national champions for 1994–95 UEFA competitions
Rank	Association	Team	Coeff.
Group stage
1	Italy	Milan (1st)^{TH}	1.861
2	Netherlands	Ajax (1st)	1.642
3	England	Manchester United (1st)	1.631
4	Germany	Bayern Munich (1st)	1.625
5	Spain	Barcelona (1st)	1.575
6	Portugal	Benfica (1st)	1.567
7	Russia	Spartak Moscow (1st)	1.470
8	Belgium	Anderlecht (1st)	1.441
Qualifying round
9	France	Paris Saint-Germain (1st)	1.426
10	Scotland	Rangers (1st)	1.400
10	Poland	Legia Warsaw (1st)	1.400
12	Austria	Casino Salzburg (1st)	1.214
13	Sweden	IFK Göteborg (1st)	1.187
14	Ukraine	Dynamo Kyiv (1st)	1.178
15	Turkey	Galatasaray (1st)	1.125
15	Romania	Steaua București (1st)	1.125
17	Czech Republic	Sparta Prague (1st)	1.115
18	Greece	AEK Athens (1st)	1.000
18	Croatia	Hajduk Split (1st)	1.000
18	Israel	Maccabi Haifa (1st)	1.000
21	Switzerland	Servette (1st)	0.906
22	Hungary	Vác Samsung (1st)	0.875
23	Denmark	Silkeborg (1st)	0.803
24	Luxembourg	Avenir Beggen (1st)	0.750
Entered UEFA Cup preliminary round
25	Norway	Rosenborg (1st)	0.700
25	Slovakia	Slovan Bratislava (1st)	0.700
27	Bulgaria	Levski Sofia (1st)	0.652
28	Cyprus	Apollon Limassol (1st)	0.500
28	Belarus	Dinamo Minsk (1st)	0.500
28	Iceland	ÍA (1st)	0.500
28	Northern Ireland	Linfield (1st)	0.500
32	Finland	Jazz (1st)	0.475
33	Slovenia	Olimpija Ljubljana (1st)	0.400
33	Albania	Teuta (1st)	0.400
35	Latvia	Skonto (1st)	0.250
36	Republic of Ireland	Shamrock Rovers (1st)	0.208
37	Malta	Hibernians (1st)	0.166
38	Armenia	Ararat Yerevan (1st)	0.000
38	Wales	Bangor City (1st)	0.000
38	Georgia	Dinamo Tbilisi (1st)	0.000
38	Estonia	Flora (1st)	0.000
38	Faroe Islands	GÍ (1st)	0.000
38	Lithuania	ROMAR Mažeikiai (1st)	0.000
38	Azerbaijan	Turan Tovuz (1st)	0.000
38	Macedonia	Vardar (1st)	0.000
38	Moldova	Zimbru Chișinău (1st)	0.000

Associations without a participating team
- FR Yugoslavia
- Liechtenstein
- San Marino

1. Liechtenstein (LIE): The teams affiliated with the Liechtenstein Football Association (LFV) played in the Swiss football league system, and thus were ineligible for a spot regardless of the association ranking. The only competition organised by the LFV was the Liechtenstein Football Cup – the winners of which qualified for the 1994–95 UEFA Cup Winners' Cup.
2. FR Yugoslavia (YUG): Due to the breakup of the country and the ensuing warfare, Yugoslavia was still disqualified from European club competitions. Thus, Partizan, champions of the 1993–94 First League of FR Yugoslavia, did not participate.

== Round and draw dates ==
The schedule of the competition was as follows. The draw was held in Geneva, Switzerland on 20 July 1994, where qualifying round pairs as well as group formations were drawn. The knockout phase pairs were made automatically by a predetermined bracket.

Phase	Round	Draw date	First leg	Second leg
Qualifying round		20 July 1994	10 August 1994	24 August 1994
Group stage	Matchday 1	20 July 1994	14 September 1994	
Group stage	Matchday 2	20 July 1994	28 September 1994	
Group stage	Matchday 3	20 July 1994	19 October 1994	
Group stage	Matchday 4	20 July 1994	2 November 1994	
Group stage	Matchday 5	20 July 1994	23 November 1994	
Group stage	Matchday 6	20 July 1994	7 December 1994	
Knockout phase	Quarter-finals	20 July 1994	1 March 1995	15 March 1995
Knockout phase	Semi-finals	20 July 1994	5 April 1995	19 April 1995
Knockout phase	Final	20 July 1994	24 May 1995 at Ernst-Happel-Stadion, Vienna	

== Qualifying round ==
Team 1	Agg.	Team 2	1st leg	2nd leg
Group A
Avenir Beggen (Luxembourg)	1–9	(Turkey) Galatasaray	1–5	0–4
Sparta Prague (Czech Republic)	1–2	(Sweden) IFK Göteborg	1–0	0–2
Group B
Silkeborg (Denmark)	1–3	(Ukraine) Dynamo Kyiv	0–0	1–3
Paris Saint-Germain (France)	5–1	(Hungary) Vác Samsung	3–0	2–1
Group C
Legia Warsaw (Poland)	0–5	(Croatia) Hajduk Split	0–1	0–4
Steaua București (Romania)	5–2	(Switzerland) Servette	4–1	1–1
Group D
AEK Athens (Greece)	3–0	(Scotland) Rangers	2–0	1–0
Maccabi Haifa (Israel)	2–5	(Austria) Casino Salzburg	1–2	1–3

== Group stage ==
Location of teams of the 1994–95 UEFA Champions League group stage.
Brown: Group A; Red: Group B; Orange: Group C; Yellow: Group D.

Ten of the sixteen participating teams made their UEFA Champions League group stage debut: AEK Athens, Ajax, Bayern Munich, Benfica, Casino Salzburg, Dynamo Kyiv, Hajduk Split, Manchester United, Paris Saint-Germain and Steaua București. Two of these teams, Benfica and Dynamo Kyiv, had previously contested the 1991–92 European Cup group stage. Casino Salzburg, Hajduk Split, Manchester United and Steaua București were the first teams to qualify for group stage from Austria, Croatia, England and Romania respectively.

It was also the last edition of the Champions League that saw teams in the group stage awarded two points for each win, with one point awarded for each draw.

=== Group A ===
Pos	Team	Pld	W	D	L	GF	GA	GD	Pts	Qualification	GOT	BAR	MUN	GAL
1	(Sweden) IFK Göteborg	6	4	1	1	10	7	+3	9	Advance to knockout stage	—	2–1	3–1	1–0
2	(Spain) Barcelona	6	2	2	2	11	8	+3	6	Advance to knockout stage	1–1	—	4–0	2–1
3	(England) Manchester United	6	2	2	2	11	11	0	6		4–2	2–2	—	4–0
4	(Turkey) Galatasaray	6	1	1	4	3	9	−6	3		0–1	2–1	0–0	—

Source: UEFA

=== Group B ===
Pos	Team	Pld	W	D	L	GF	GA	GD	Pts	Qualification	PAR	BAY	SPM	DKV
1	(France) Paris Saint-Germain	6	6	0	0	12	3	+9	12	Advance to knockout stage	—	2–0	4–1	1–0
2	(Germany) Bayern Munich	6	2	2	2	8	7	+1	6	Advance to knockout stage	0–1	—	2–2	1–0
3	(Russia) Spartak Moscow	6	1	2	3	8	12	−4	4		1–2	1–1	—	1–0
4	(Ukraine) Dynamo Kyiv	6	1	0	5	5	11	−6	2		1–2	1–4	3–2	—

Source: UEFA

=== Group C ===
Pos	Team	Pld	W	D	L	GF	GA	GD	Pts	Qualification	BEN	HAJ	STE	AND
1	(Portugal) Benfica	6	3	3	0	9	5	+4	9	Advance to knockout stage	—	2–1	2–1	3–1
2	(Croatia) Hajduk Split	6	2	2	2	5	7	−2	6	Advance to knockout stage	0–0	—	1–4	2–1
3	(Romania) Steaua București	6	1	3	2	7	6	+1	5		1–1	0–1	—	1–1
4	(Belgium) Anderlecht	6	0	4	2	4	7	−3	4		1–1	0–0	0–0	—

Source: UEFA

=== Group D ===
Pos	Team	Pld	W	D	L	GF	GA	GD	Pts	Qualification	AJX	MIL	SAL	AEK
1	(Netherlands) Ajax	6	4	2	0	9	2	+7	10	Advance to knockout stage	—	2–0	1–1	2–0
2	(Italy) Milan	6	3	1	2	6	5	+1	5 (Note: Milan were docked two points for crowd trouble against Casino Salzburg on matchday 2. This occurred after Casino Salzburg goalkeeper Otto Konrad was hit on the head with a plastic bottle thrown from the stands, sustaining an injury for which he had to be substituted and taken to the hospital.)	Advance to knockout stage	0–2	—	3–0	2–1
3	(Austria) Casino Salzburg	6	1	3	2	4	6	−2	5		0–0	0–1	—	0–0
4	(Greece) AEK Athens	6	0	2	4	3	9	−6	2		1–2	0–0	1–3	—

Source: UEFA

== Knockout stage ==
=== Bracket ===
Quarter-finals
(Germany) Bayern Munich (a)	0	2	2
(Sweden) IFK Göteborg	0	2	2
(Croatia) Hajduk Split	0	0	0
(Netherlands) Ajax	0	3	3
(Spain) Barcelona	1	1	2
(France) Paris Saint-Germain	1	2	3
(Italy) Milan	2	0	2
(Portugal) Benfica	0	0	0

Semi-finals
(Germany) Bayern Munich	0	2	2
(Netherlands) Ajax	0	5	5
(France) Paris Saint-Germain	0	0	0
(Italy) Milan	1	2	3

Final
24 May – Vienna
(Netherlands) Ajax	1
(Italy) Milan	0

=== Quarter-finals ===
Team 1	Agg.	Team 2	1st leg	2nd leg
Bayern Munich (Germany)	2–2 (a)	(Sweden) IFK Göteborg	0–0	2–2
Hajduk Split (Croatia)	0–3	(Netherlands) Ajax	0–0	0–3
Barcelona (Spain)	2–3	(France) Paris Saint-Germain	1–1	1–2
Milan (Italy)	2–0	(Portugal) Benfica	2–0	0–0

=== Semi-finals ===
Team 1	Agg.	Team 2	1st leg	2nd leg
Bayern Munich (Germany)	2–5	(Netherlands) Ajax	0–0	2–5
Paris Saint-Germain (France)	0–3	(Italy) Milan	0–1	0–2

=== Final ===
The final was played on 24 May 1995 at the Ernst Happel Stadion in Vienna, Austria.

24 May 1995
20:30 UTC+2

Ajax (Netherlands)	1–0	(Italy) Milan
Kluivert 85'	Report

Ernst-Happel-Stadion, Vienna
Attendance: 49,730
Referee: Ion Crăciunescu (Romania)

== Top goalscorers ==
Rank	Name	Team	Goals
1	(Liberia) George Weah	(France) Paris Saint-Germain	7
2	(Finland) Jari Litmanen	(Netherlands) Ajax	6
3	(Sweden) Magnus Erlingmark	(Sweden) IFK Göteborg	4
3	(Italy) Marco Simone	(Italy) Milan	4
5	(Spain) José Mari Bakero	(Spain) Barcelona	3
5	(Brazil) Romário	(Spain) Barcelona	3
5	(Bulgaria) Hristo Stoichkov	(Spain) Barcelona	3
5	(Argentina) Claudio Caniggia	(Portugal) Benfica	3
5	(Germany) Christian Nerlinger	(Germany) Bayern Munich	3
5	(Germany) Mehmet Scholl	(Germany) Bayern Munich	3
5	(Ukraine) Viktor Leonenko	(Ukraine) Dynamo Kyiv	3

== See also ==
- 1994–95 UEFA Cup Winners' Cup
- 1994–95 UEFA Cup
