= Stadio Nereo Rocco =

Italian in football stadium in Trieste

Coordinates: 45°37′21″N 13°47′34″E

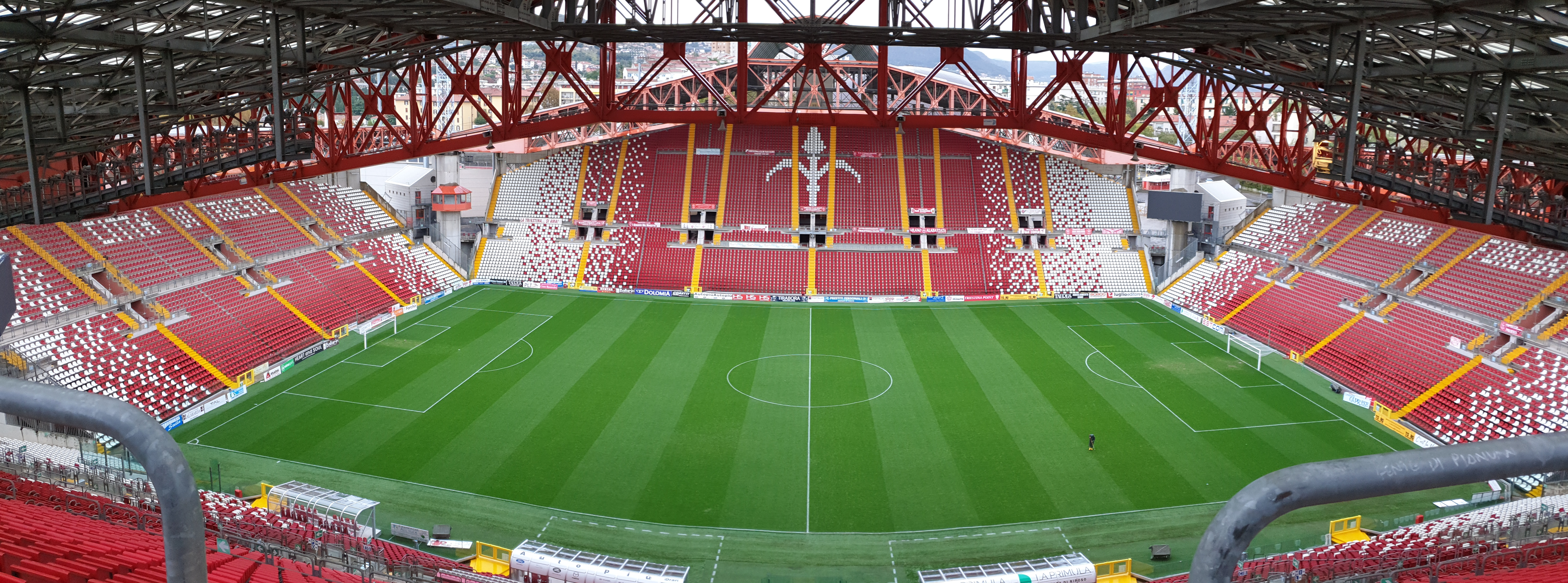
- Interactive map of Stadio Nereo Rocco
- Location: Via dei Macelli 5, Trieste, Italy
- Owner: Municipality of Trieste
- Capacity: 26,566
- Surface: Grass

Construction
- Groundbreaking: 1987
- Opened: 18 October 1992
- Renovated: 2018
- Cost: ITL100 billion

Tenants
- Triestina (1992–present); Italy national football team (selected matches); Cagliari (2012)

Stadio Nereo Rocco is a football stadium in Trieste, Italy. Opened in 1992, it is the home of Triestina, named after the club's former player and manager Nereo Rocco. The stadium is located in the Valmaura district on the southern outskirts of the city, close to the club's former venue Stadio Giuseppe Grezar.

Originally built with a capacity of 26,000, renovations done in 2018 before the venue hosted matches of the 2019 UEFA European Under-21 Championship reduced the capacity to 21,000.

Cagliari played their final home games of the 2011–12 Serie A season at the ground, due to restoration of their Stadio Sant'Elia.

== International matches ==
Stadio Nereo Rocco hosted four matches of the Italy national football team.

#	Date	Competition	Opponent	Score	Att.	Italy scorers	Ref
1.	14 April 1993	1994 World Cup qualifying	Estonia	2–0	22,279	R. Baggio, Signori	
2.	29 March 1997	1998 World Cup qualifying	Moldova	3–0	17,677	Maldini, Zola, Vieri	
3.	28 March 2001	2002 World Cup qualifying	Lithuania	4–0	14,593	Inzaghi (2), Del Piero (2)	
4.	21 August 2002	Friendly	Slovenia	0–1	11,080	—	

== Entertainment events ==
English pop singer Robbie Williams performed at the stadium on 17 July 2025 as part of his Britpop Tour.

== See also ==
- Football in Italy
- Lists of stadiums
