= Václav Krondl =

Czech football referee

- Born: 5 February 1953 (age 73)

Domestic
Years	League	Role
1989–1999	Gambrinus Liga	Referee

International
Years	League	Role
1992–1999	FIFA-listed	Referee

Václav Krondl (born 5 February 1953) is a retired Czech football referee. He is known for being the referee of the 1994 European Cup Winners' Cup Final. He also refereed one match in the 1996 UEFA European Football Championship in England.

Preceded by UEFA Cup Winners' Cup Final 1993 (Germany) Karl-Josef Assenmacher	UEFA Cup Winners' Cup Final Referees; Final 1994 (Czech Republic) Václav Krondl	Succeeded by UEFA Cup Winners' Cup Final 1995 (Italy) Piero Ceccarini
