= Gerd Grabher =

Austrian football referee

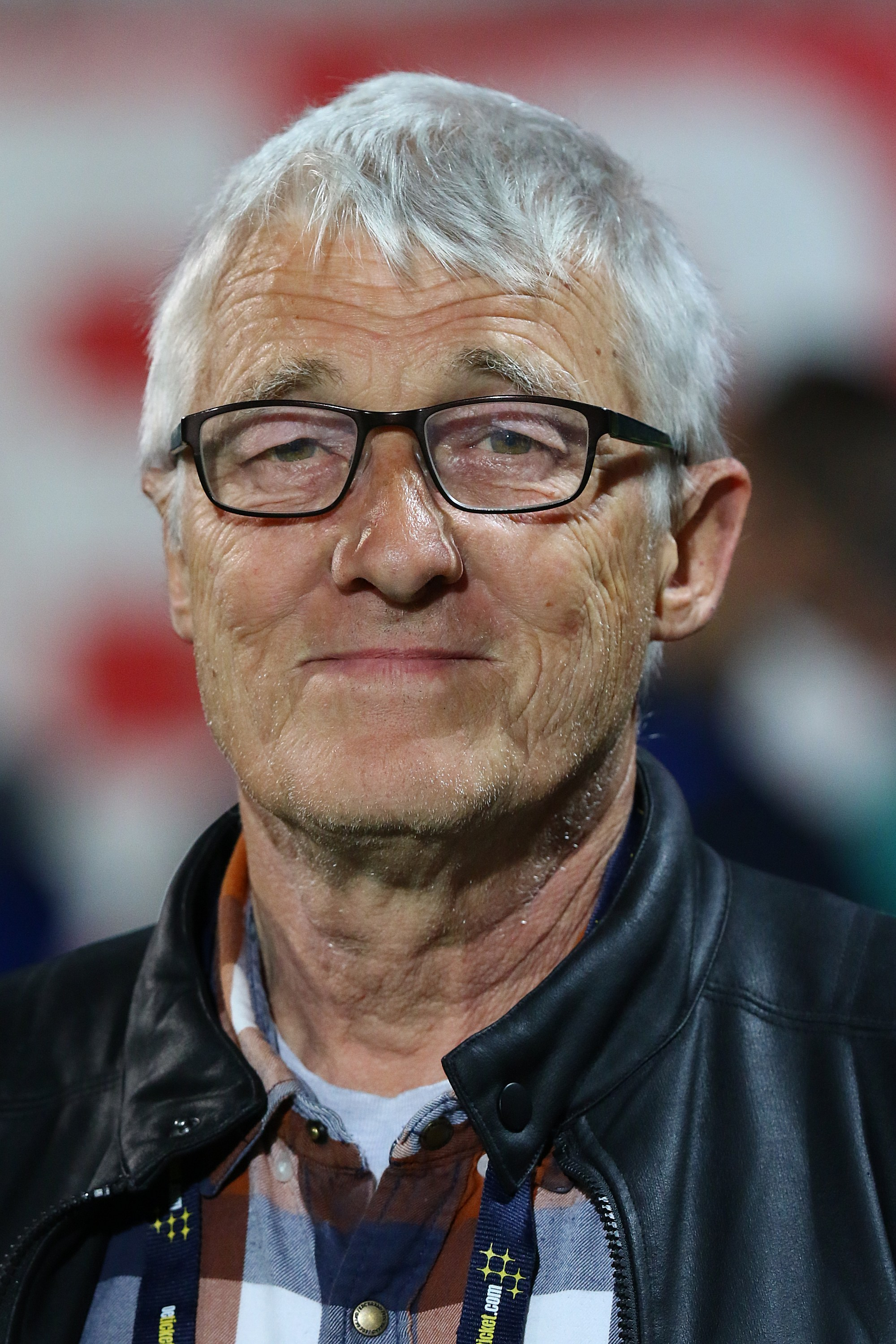
- Gerd Grabher in April 2018
- Born: 2 November 1953 (age 72); Lustenau, Austria

Domestic
Years	League	Role
1989–2000	Bundesliga	referee

International
Years	League	Role
1991–2000	FIFA-listed	Referee

Gerd Grabher (born 2 November 1953 in Lustenau) is a retired Austrian football referee. He is known for having refereed one match in the 1996 UEFA European Football Championship in England.

A former FIFA referee, Grabher is known to have served as a referee in international matches during the period from 1991 to 1998. Grabher also officiated in 1994 and 1998 World Cup qualifiers and qualifying matches for the 1992, 1996, and 2000 European Championships.
