= Leslie Mottram =

Scottish football referee

Les Mottram
- Full name: Leslie William Mottram
- Born: 5 March 1951 (age 75)

Domestic
Years	League	Role
1989–1996	Scottish Football League	Referee
1996–2002	J. League	Referee

International
Years	League	Role
1991–1996	FIFA-listed	Referee

Leslie William Mottram (born 5 March 1951) is a Scottish retired football referee best known for supervising two matches in the 1994 FIFA World Cup in the United States. Mottram also officiated at UEFA Euro 1996 in England, including the semifinal match between France and the Czech Republic. He is known to have served as a FIFA referee during the period from 1991 to 1996.

Mottram turned to refereeing after a brief professional playing career at Airdrie.

He became a professional referee when he left Scotland to officiate in the Japanese J. League in 1996. Although his original contract was only for three-months, J. League organisers, who were impressed by his refereeing ability, offered long term contracts. He refereed 147 matches in J1, 15 in J2 and 25 in the J. League Cup from 1996 to 2001, including each playoff game from 1997 to 2001, and received four "most excellent referee" awards in the 1998 to 2002 seasons.

He retired from refereeing top league matches in 2002 and was appointed as the chief refereeing instructor by the Japan Football Association. He worked in this job for next four years and also had a seat on the discipline committee of the league for a short time. He was awarded a merit medal in the 2005 seasonal ceremony, then left Japan and went back to Scotland.
