= Peter Mikkelsen (referee) =

Danish football referee (1960–2019)

- Mikkelsen during the 1990 FIFA World Cup
- Born: 1 May 1960; Amager, Denmark
- Died: 30 January 2019 (aged 58)
- Other occupation: Teacher

Domestic
Years	League	Role
1985–1998	Danish Superliga	Referee

International
Years	League	Role
1985–1996	FIFA-listed	Referee

Peter Mikkelsen (1 May 1960 – 30 January 2019) was a Danish football referee, once the youngest referee to be selected to officiate at the FIFA World Cup. He refereed five matches at FIFA World Cups: two in 1990 and three in 1994. He also refereed at two UEFA European Championship tournaments: in 1992 and 1996.

From 2008 to his death, Mikkelsen worked in the Human Resources department of the Danish company F-Group.

== Honours ==
- IFFHS World's Best Referee (2): 1991, 1993
