= Ion Crăciunescu =

Romanian footballer and referee

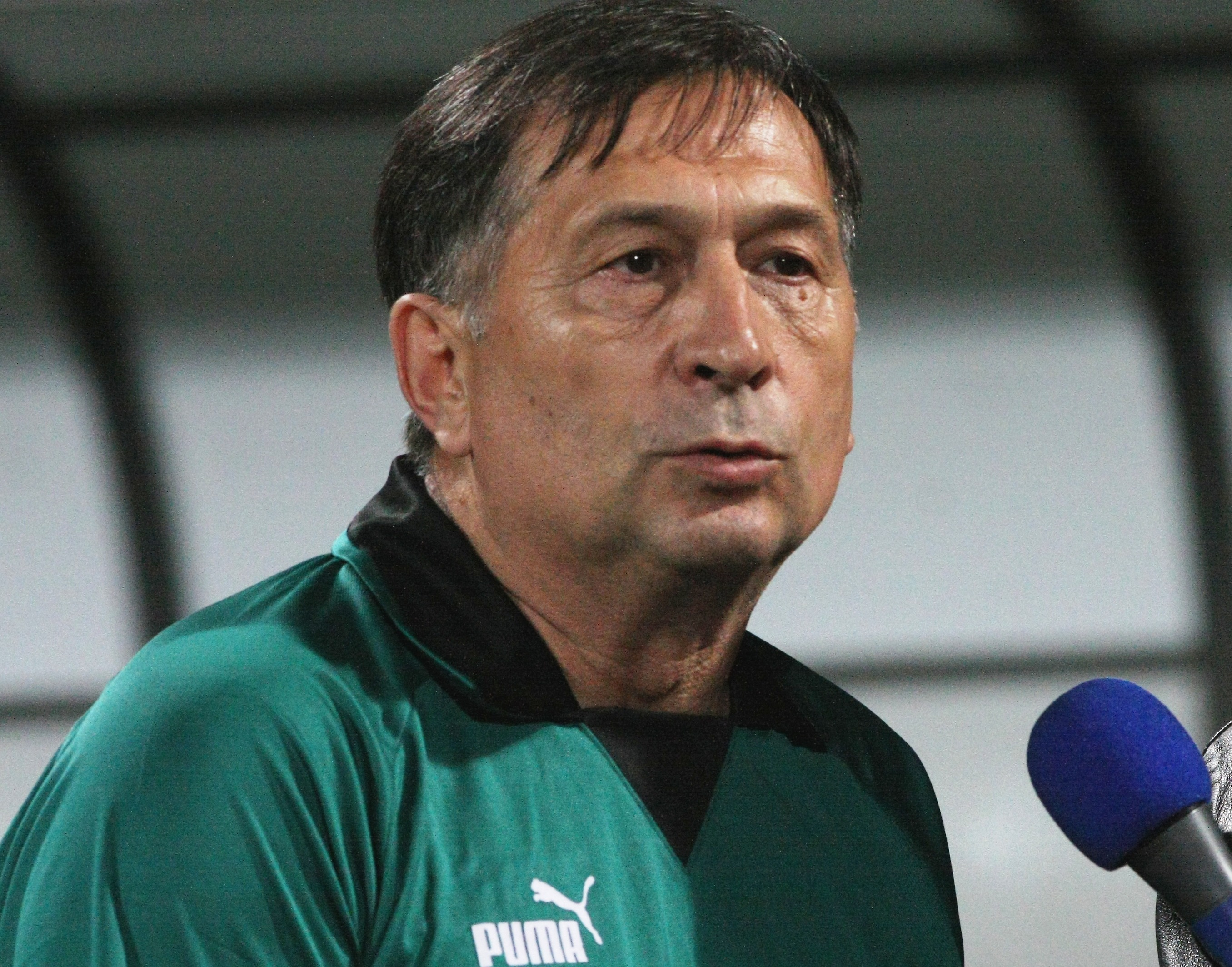
- Crăciunescu in 2010
- Born: 27 September 1950 (age 76); Craiova, Romania
- Other occupation: Footballer

Domestic
Years	League	Role
1981–1996	Liga I	Referee

International
Years	League	Role
1984–1996	FIFA-listed	Referee

Ion Crăciunescu (born 27 September 1950) is a Romanian former football referee and player. Born in Craiova, he comes from the town of Râmnicu Vâlcea. Crăciunescu was a footballer at Chimia Râmnicu Vâlcea and Universitatea Craiova until he retired in 1975, choosing to start a new career as a referee. He became an international referee in 1984. Although he never refereed at a World Cup or European Championship finals, he was selected as one of five referees for the 1995 King Fahd Cup (later known as the FIFA Confederations Cup). He is best known for officiating the 1995 UEFA Champions League Final between Ajax and Milan. He retired as a professional later that year. From 2003 to 2005, he was the president of the Romanian Referees Committee. His son, Theodor Crăciunescu was also a football referee.

== Honours ==
=== Player ===
Chimia Râmnicu Vâlcea

- Cupa României: 1972–73

Universitatea Craiova

- Liga I: 1973–74
