= 1995–96 AFC Ajax season =

Dutch football club season

Ajax
1995–96 season
- Manager: Louis van Gaal
- Stadium: De Meer Stadion; Olympisch Stadion (selected matches)
- Eredivisie: 1st
- KNVB Cup: Round of 16
- Johan Cruijff Shield: Winners
- Champions League: Runners-up
- UEFA Super Cup: Winners
- Intercontinental Cup: Winners
- Top goalscorer: League: Patrick Kluivert (15); All: Patrick Kluivert, Jari Litmanen (23 each)
Home colours	Away colours

During the 1995–96 Dutch football season, Ajax competed in the Eredivisie.

== Players ==
=== First-team squad ===
Note: Flags indicate national team as defined under FIFA eligibility rules; some limited exceptions apply. Players may hold more than one non-FIFA nationality.

No.	Pos.	Nation	Player
—	GK	NED	Fred Grim
—	GK	NED	Edwin van der Sar
—	DF	NED	Danny Blind (captain)
—	DF	NED	Winston Bogarde
—	DF	NED	Frank de Boer (vice captain)
—	DF	NED	Michael Reiziger
—	DF	NED	Arnold Scholten
—	DF	NED	Sonny Silooy
—	DF	BRA	Márcio Santos
—	MF	NED	Ronald de Boer
—	MF	NED	Edgar Davids (Note: Davids was born in Paramaribo, Suriname, but also qualified to represent the Netherlands internationally and made his international debut for the Netherlands in April 1994.)
—	MF	NED	Rob Gehring
—	MF	NED	Denny Landzaat

No.	Pos.	Nation	Player
—	MF	NED	Peter Hoekstra (from January 1996)
—	MF	ZAI	Kiki Musampa (Note: Musampa was born in Kinshasa, Zaire (now Democratic Republic of the Congo), but also qualified to represent the Netherlands internationally and represented the Netherlands at U-20 and U-21 level.)
—	MF	NED	Marc Overmars
—	MF	NED	Martijn Reuser
—	MF	NED	Dennis Schulp
—	MF	NED	Ignacio Tuhuteru
—	MF	NED	Dave van den Bergh
—	MF	NED	Nordin Wooter (Note: Wooter was born in Paramaribo, Suriname, but also qualified to represent the Netherlands internationally and represented the Netherlands at U-18 and U-21 level.)
—	MF	NGA	Finidi George
—	FW	NED	Patrick Kluivert
—	FW	FIN	Jari Litmanen
—	FW	RUS	Andriy Demchenko (Note: Demchenko was born in Zaporizhzhia, Ukrainian SSR, Soviet Union (now Ukraine), but also qualified to represent Russia internationally and represented Russia at U-19, U-20 and U-21 level.)
—	FW	NGA	Nwankwo Kanu

=== Reserve squad ===
Note: Flags indicate national team as defined under FIFA eligibility rules; some limited exceptions apply. Players may hold more than one non-FIFA nationality.

No.	Pos.	Nation	Player
—	DF	AUS	Hayden Foxe
—	MF	USA	John O'Brien
—	DF	NED	Arno Splinter

=== Transfers ===
In
Pos.	Name	from	Type
DF	Marcio Santos	Fiorentina	
MF	Arnold Scholten	Feyenoord	
MF	Andriy Demchenko	CSKA Moscow	

Out
Pos.	Name	To	Type
MF	Clarence Seedorf	Sampdoria	
MF	Frank Rijkaard		retired
MF	John van den Brom	İstanbulspor	
MF	Tarik Oulida	Sevilla	
FW	Peter van Vossen	İstanbulspor	
FW	Clyde Wijnhard	RKC Waalwijk	

==== Winter ====
In
Pos.	Name	from	Type
MF	Peter Hoekstra	PSV Eindhoven	

Out
Pos.	Name	To	Type

== Competitions ==
=== Eredivisie ===
==== League table ====
Pos	Team	Pld	W	D	L	GF	GA	GD	Pts	Qualification or relegation
1	Ajax (C)	34	26	5	3	97	24	+73	83	Qualification to Champions League group stage
2	PSV (Note: Winners KNVB Cup.)	34	24	5	5	97	25	+72	77	Qualification to Cup Winners' Cup first round
3	Feyenoord	34	18	9	7	66	36	+30	63	Qualification to UEFA Cup first round
4	Roda JC	34	15	12	7	51	35	+16	57	Qualification to UEFA Cup first round
5	Vitesse Arnhem	34	15	8	11	48	44	+4	53	

(C) Champions

==== Results by round ====
Round	1	2	3	4	5	6	7	8	9	10	11	12	13	14	15	16	17	18	19	20	21	22	23	24	25	26	27	28	29	30	31	32	33	34
Ground	A	A	H	A	H	A	H	A	H	H	A	H	A	H	A	H	H	A	H	A	H	A	H	A	H	A	A	A	H	H	A	H	A	H
Result	W	W	W	W	W	W	W	W	W	W	W	W	D	W	W	W	W	W	L	D	W	L	W	W	D	W	W	L	W	D	W	W	W	D
Position	1	1	1	1	1	1	1	1	1	1	1	1	1	1	1	1	1	1	1	1	1	1	1	1	2	1	1	1	1	1	1	1	1	1

Source: Competitive matches
A = Away; H = Home; W = Win; D = Draw; L = Loss; = Leader, 1996–97 UEFA Champions League Group stage; = 1996–97 UEFA Cup

==== Matches ====
20 August 1995 1	Ajax	4–0	Utrecht	Amsterdam
	Davids 48'; Kluivert 59'; Blind 62'; Reuser 73'; Blind (yellow card)	Report	(yellow card) 76' (yellow-red card) Vierklau; (yellow card) Ten Hag	Stadium: De Meer Stadion; Referee: Roelof Luinge

25 August 1995 2	NEC	0–6	Ajax	Nijmegen
	Stock (yellow card)	Report	7' Finidi; 31' Davids; 33' Overmars; 50' Reuser; 55' Finidi; 72' Overmars	Stadium: Goffertstadion; Referee: Jan Wegereef

10 September 1995 3	Ajax	4–0	Sparta	Amsterdam
	Kanu 6'; Kanu 23'; Overmars 40'; Reuser 89'	Report	(yellow card) Smith	Stadium: De Meer Stadion; Referee: Jaap Uilenberg

17 September 1995 4	Go Ahead Eagles	0–4	Ajax	Deventer
	Hulshoff (yellow card); Verkuyl (yellow card); Michels (yellow card)		57' (o.g.) Marbus; 65' Kanu; 76' (pen.)Kanu; 81' Davids	Stadium: Adelaarshorst; Referee: John Blankenstein

20 September 1995 5	Ajax	4–0	Fortuna Sittard	Amsterdam
	Frank de Boer 17'; Kanu 20'; Ronald de Boer 26'; Overmars 85'	Report	(yellow card) Lee	Stadium: De Meer Stadion; Referee: Jeff van Vliet

24 September 1995 6	NAC	0–1	Ajax	Breda
	Lokhoff (yellow card)	Report	63' Kluivert; (yellow card) Bogarde	Stadium: NAC Stadion; Referee: Dick Jol

01 October 1995 7	Heerenveen	0–4	Ajax	Heerenveen
	Doesburg (yellow card)	Report	12' Davids; 57' (o.g.) Straal; 67' Litmanen; 73' Kluivert	Stadium: Abe Lenstra Stadion; Referee: Jaap Uilenberg

04 October 1995 8	Ajax	3–0	Vitesse	Amsterdam
	Kluivert 23', (yellow card); Davids 53'; R De Boer 71'		(yellow card) Van Wanrooy	Stadium: De Meer Stadion; Referee: Jan Wegereef

15 October 1995 9	Twente	0–3	Ajax	Twente
		Report	26' Litmanen; 31' Overmars; 60' Overmars	Stadium: Diekman Stadion; Referee: Mario van der Ende

22 October 1995 10	Feyenoord	2–4	Ajax	Rotterdam
	Zwijnenberg 2'; Larsson 7' van Gobbel (yellow card)	Report	13' Bogarde; 29' Litmanen; 37' Overmars; 57' Overmars	Stadium: De Kuip; Referee: Jaap Uilenberg

25 October 1995 11	Ajax	4–0	Volendam	Amsterdam
	F de Boer 15'; R de Boer 18'; R de Boer 51'; Wooter 79'	Report	(red card) 58' Nijholt; (yellow card) 90' (yellow-red card) Kromheer; (yellow card) Persijn	Stadium: De Meer Stadion; Referee: Herman van Dijk

28 October 1995 12	Ajax	6–1	Roda JC	Amsterdam
	Kluivert 13'; Litmanen 16'; Blind 22'; Davids 37'; Kluivert 56'; Kanu 67'	Report	53' Roelofsen	Stadium: De Meer Stadion; Referee: Roelof Luinge

05 November 1995 14	Ajax	1–1	PSV	Amsterdam
	Kanu 34'	Report	32' Ronaldo	Stadium: Olympisch Stadion; Referee: John Blankenstein

08 November 1995 13	RKC	0–3	Ajax	Waalwijk
		Report	21'Kluivert; 59' Kluivert; 89' (pen.) Litmanen	Stadium: Sportpark Olympia; Referee: Mario van der Ende

19 November 1995 15	Ajax	4–1	Groningen	Amsterdam
	Kluivert 11'; Litmanen 20' (pen.); Kanu 69'; Overmars 82'		90' De Jong	Stadium: De Meer Stadion; Referee: Jef van Vliet

17 December 1995 18	Utrecht	0–3	Ajax	Utrecht
			10' Overmars; 25' (pen.) Litmanen; 38' Litmanen	Stadium: Stadion Galgenwaard; Referee: Hugo Luijten

20 December 1995 17	Ajax	1–0	De Graafschap	Amsterdam
	Litmanen 45'; Overmars 59'			Stadium: Olympisch Stadion; Referee: Jaap Uilenberg

24 December 1995 19	Ajax	3–1	NEC	Amsterdam
	Litmanen 12'; Finidi 39'; R de Boer 73' (pen.)		48' Sumiala	Stadium: De Meer Stadion; Referee: Wout Schaap

14 January 1996 16	Willem II	1–0	Ajax	Tilburg
	Van der Vegt 56'	Report		Stadium: Willem II Stadion; Referee: Wegeref

21 January 1996 20	Sparta	3–3	Ajax	Rotterdam
	Jalink 7'; Krijgsman 20'; De Nooijer 31'	Report	16' Bogarde; 19' Scholten; 62' Hoekstra	Stadium: Stadion Spangen; Referee: Mario van der Ende

25 February 1996 24	Ajax	6–2	Heerenveen	Amsterdam
	Kluivert 20'; R de Boer 23'; Hoekstra 46'; Kanu 54'; Blind 56'; Kluivert 71'	Report	84' Wouden; 87' Wouden	Stadium: De Meer Stadion; Referee: Rene Temmink

03 March 1996 25	Vitesse	2–1	Ajax	Arnhem
	Laros 9'; Laros 70'	Report	87' Kluivert	Stadium: Nieuw Monnikenhuize; Referee: Wegeref

10 March 1996 26	Ajax	6–1	Twente	Amsterdam
	F De Boer 37'; Davids 39'; Kluivert 50'; Ayupov 54' (o.g.); Musampa 65'; Hoekstra 66'	Report	67' Ten Caat	Stadium: De Meer Stadion; Referee: Luinge

13 March 1996 22	Fortuna Sittard	1–2	Ajax	Sittard
	Jeffrey 75'; Roest (red card) 76'		72' Kanu; 81' Kluivert	Stadium: Fortuna Sittard Stadion; Referee: Herman van Dijk

17 March 1996 27	Volendam	0–0	Ajax	Volendam
				Stadium: Kras Stadion

24 March 1996 28	Ajax	2–0	Feyenoord	Amsterdam
	Litmanen 25'; Kluivert 54'			Stadium: Olympisch Stadion; Referee: Uilenberg

27 March 1996 21	Ajax	2–1	Go Ahead Eagles	Amsterdam
	Hoekstra 31'; Kanu 61'		88' Verkuyl	Stadium: De Meer Stadion; Referee: Bossen

30 March 1996 29	Roda JC	2–0	Ajax	Kerkrade
	Babangida 18'; Doomernik 35'			Stadium: Sportpark Kaalheide; Referee: Luinge

06 April 1996 23	Ajax	2–0	NAC	Amsterdam
	R. de Boer 19'; Kanu 45'			Stadium: De Meer Stadion; Referee: Dick van Egmond

08 April 1996 31	PSV	1–1	Ajax	Eindhoven
	Nilis 40'; Wouters (yellow card)		53', (yellow card) Hoekstra	Stadium: Philips Stadion; Referee: Mario van der Ende

13 April 1996 30	Ajax	1–0	RKC	Amsterdam
	Reiziger 60'			Stadium: De Meer Stadion; Referee: Fred Sterk

21 April 1996 32	Groningen	3–4	Ajax	Groningen
	Sion 24'; Bombarda 40'; Sion 78'		32' (pen.) Litmanen; 44' Litmanen; 47' Kanu; 90' Wooter	Stadium: Stadion Oosterpark; Referee: Temmink

28 April 1996 33	Ajax	5–1	Willem II	Amsterdam
	Litmanen 18' van Fessen 32' (o.g.); Finidi 34'; Finidi 70'; Finidi 71'		82' De Gier	Stadium: De Meer Stadion; Referee: Hugo Luitjen

05 May 1996 34	De Graafschap	0–0	Ajax	Doetinchem
				Stadium: De Vijverberg; Referee: Luinge

=== KNVB Cup ===
24 January 1996 First Round	Heracles‘74	0–3	Ajax	Bornsestraat, Almelo

30 January 1996 Second Round	Cambuur	2–0	Ajax	Cambuur Stadion, Leeuwarden

=== Dutch Supercup ===
16 August 1995	Ajax	2–1 (a.e.t.)	Feyenoord	De Kuip, Rotterdam
	R. de Boer 25'; Kluivert 102' (pen.)		Larsson 27'	Attendance: 25,000; Referee: Mario van der Ende

=== UEFA Champions League ===
==== Group stage ====
Pos	Team	Pld	W	D	L	GF	GA	GD	Pts	Qualification	AJX	RMA	FER	GRA
1	(Netherlands) Ajax	6	5	1	0	15	1	+14	16	Advance to knockout stage	—	1–0	4–0	3–0
2	(Spain) Real Madrid	6	3	1	2	11	5	+6	10	Advance to knockout stage	0–2	—	6–1	2–0
3	(Hungary) Ferencváros	6	1	2	3	9	19	−10	5		1–5	1–1	—	3–3
4	(Switzerland) Grasshopper	6	0	2	4	3	13	−10	2		0–0	0–2	0–3	—

Source: UEFA

13 September 1995 1	Ajax (Netherlands)	1–0	(Spain) Real Madrid	Amsterdam
20:30	Overmars 14'	Report		Stadium: Olympic Stadium; Attendance: 38,000; Referee: Piero Ceccarini (Italy)

27 September 1995 2	Ferencváros (Hungary)	1–5	(Netherlands) Ajax	Budapest
20:30	Nyilas 59' (pen.)	Report	Litmanen 57', 80' (pen.), 88'; Kluivert 67'; F. de Boer 85'	Stadium: Űllői út Attendance: 18,000; Referee: Vassilios Nikakis (Greece)

18 October 1995 3	Ajax (Netherlands)	3–0	(Switzerland) Grasshopper	Amsterdam
20:30	Kluivert 10', 68'; Finidi 87'	Report		Stadium: Olympic Stadium; Attendance: 41,000; Referee: Adrian Porumboiu (Romania)

1 November 1995 4	Grasshopper (Switzerland)	0–0	(Netherlands) Ajax	Zürich
20:30		Report		Stadium: Hardturm; Attendance: 20,100; Referee: Nikolay Levnikov (Russia)

22 November 1995 5	Real Madrid (Spain)	0–2	(Netherlands) Ajax	Madrid
20:30		Report	64' Litmanen; 76' Kluivert	Stadium: Santiago Bernabéu; Attendance: 72,000; Referee: Hellmut Krug (Germany)

6 December 1995 6	Ajax (Netherlands)	4–0	(Hungary) Ferencváros	Amsterdam
20:30	Overmars 17'; R. de Boer 22'; Litmanen 62', 66'	Report		Stadium: Olympic Stadium; Attendance: 42,319; Referee: Ilkka Koho (Finland)

==== Knockout phase ====
===== Quarter-finals =====
6 March 1996 First Leg	Borussia Dortmund (Germany)	0–2	(Netherlands) Ajax	Dortmund, Germany
20:30		Report	Davids 8'; Kluivert 85'	Stadium: Westfalenstadion; Attendance: 35,800; Referee: Dermot Gallagher (England)

20 March 1996 Second Leg	Ajax (Netherlands)	1–0	(Germany) Borussia Dortmund	Amsterdam, Netherlands
20:30	Musampa 75'	Report		Stadium: Olympic Stadium; Attendance: 43,000; Referee: Vaclav Krondl (Czech Republic)

===== Semi-finals =====
3 April 1996 First Leg	Ajax (Netherlands)	0–1	(Greece) Panathinaikos	Olympic Stadium, Amsterdam
20:30		Report	Warzycha 87'	Attendance: 42,000; Referee: László Vágner (Hungary)

17 April 1996 Second Leg	Panathinaikos (Greece)	0–3	(Netherlands) Ajax	Spyros Louis, Athens
21:30		Report	Litmanen 4', 77'; Wooter 86'	Attendance: 74,000; Referee: José María García-Aranda (Spain)

===== Final =====
22 May 1996	Ajax (Netherlands)	1–1 (a.e.t.) (2–4 p)	(Italy) Juventus	Stadio Olimpico, Rome
20:30	Litmanen 41'	Report	Ravanelli 13'	Attendance: 67,000; Referee: Manuel Díaz Vega (Spain)
	Penalties
	Davids (penalty missed); Litmanen (penalty scored); Scholten (penalty scored); Silooy (penalty missed)		(penalty scored) Ferrara; (penalty scored) Pessotto; (penalty scored) Padovano; (penalty scored) Jugović

=== Intercontinental Cup ===
28 November 1995	Ajax (Netherlands)	0–0 (a.e.t.) (4–3 p)	(Brazil) Grêmio	National Stadium, Tokyo
18:15		Report		Attendance: 47,129; Referee: David Elleray (England)
	Penalties
	Kluivert (penalty missed); R. de Boer (penalty scored); F. de Boer (penalty scored); George (penalty scored); Blind (penalty scored)		(penalty missed) Dinho; (penalty missed) Arce; (penalty scored) Magno; (penalty scored) Gélson; (penalty scored) Adílson

=== UEFA Super Cup ===
6 February 1996 First Leg	Real Zaragoza (Spain)	1–1	(Netherlands) Ajax	La Romareda, Zaragoza
	Aguado 28'		Kluivert 70'	Attendance: 17,500; Referee: Rémi Harrel (France)

28 February 1996 Second Leg	Ajax (Netherlands)	4–0	(Spain) Real Zaragoza	Olympic Stadium, Amsterdam
	Bogarde 43'; George 54'; Blind 65' (pen.), 69' (pen.)			Attendance: 23,000; Referee: Leslie Mottram (Scotland)

== Statistics ==
=== Appearances and goals ===
As of 22 May 1996

No.	Pos	Nat	Player	Total		Eredivisie		KNBV		Champions League		Dutch Supercup UEFA Supercup & Intercontinental Cup	
No.	Pos	Nat	Player	Apps	Goals	Apps	Goals	Apps	Goals	Apps	Goals	Apps	Goals
--	GK	(Netherlands) NED	Van der Sar	50	-3	33	0	2	0	11	-3	4	0
--	DF	(Netherlands) NED	Reiziger	41	1	26	1	2	0	9	0	4	0
--	DF	(Netherlands) NED	F. de Boer	47	4	32	3	2	0	9	1	4	0
--	DF	(Netherlands) NED	Blind	44	5	31	3	2	0	8	0	3	2
--	DF	(Netherlands) NED	Bogarde	50	3	31+2	2	2	0	11	0	4	1
--	MF	(Nigeria) NGA	Finidi	44	9	28+1	6	1	1	10	1	4	1
--	MF	(Netherlands) NED	Davids	42	8	28	7	0	0	11	1	3	0
--	MF	(Netherlands) NED	R. de Boer	46	10	30	7	2	1	11	1	3	1
--	FW	(Nigeria) NGA	Kanu	40	13	18+10	13	0	0	7+2	0	2+1	0
--	FW	(Finland) FIN	Litmanen	40	23	22+4	14	2	0	10	9	2	0
--	FW	(Netherlands) NED	Kluivert	42	23	26+2	15	2	1	6+2	5	4	2
--	GK	(Netherlands) NED	Grim	1	0	1	0	0	0	0	0	0	0
--	MF	(Netherlands) NED	Hoekstra	18	5	16	5	2	0	0	0	0	0
--	MF	(Netherlands) NED	Overmars	23	12	15	10	0	0	6	2	2	0
--	DF	(Netherlands) NED	Silooy	16	0	9+2	0	0	0	4	0	1	0
--	MF	(Netherlands) NED	Wooter	35	3	7+18	2	1+1	0	2+4	1	0+2	0
--	DF	(Netherlands) NED	Scholten	27	1	6+10	1	2	0	2+4	0	3	0
--	MF	(Netherlands) NED	Reuser	24	3	5+13	3	0	0	1+3	0	0+2	0
--	DF	(Brazil) BRA	Márcio Santos	7	0	4+3	0	0	0	0	0	0	0
--	MF	(Zaire) ZAI	Musampa	26	2	3+13	1	0+2	0	3+4	1	1	0
--	DF	(Nigeria) NGA	C. Kanu	2	0	2	0	0	0	0	0	0	0
--	FW	(Russia) RUS	Demchenko	3	0	1+1	0	0	0	0	0	0+1	0
--	MF	(Netherlands) NED	van den Bergh	4	0	0+2	0	0	0	0	0	0+2	0
--	MF	(Netherlands) NED	Landzaat	2	0	0+1	0	0	0	0+1	0	0	0
--	MF	(Netherlands) NED	Schulp	1	0	0+1	0	0	0	0	0	0	0
--	MF	(Netherlands) NED	Tuhuteru	1	0	0	0	0	0	0+1	0	0	0
--	MF	(Netherlands) NED	Gehring	1	0	0	0	0	0	0	0	0+1	0
