= 1995–96 Rangers F.C. season =

Rangers
1995–96 season
- Chairman: David Murray
- Manager: Walter Smith
- Ground: Ibrox Stadium
- Scottish Premier Division: 1st (champions)
- Scottish Cup: Winners
- League Cup: Semi-finals
- Champions League: Group stage
- Top goalscorer: League: Gordon Durie (17); All: Gordon Durie (23)
Home colours	Away colours

The 1995–96 season was the 116th season of competitive football by Rangers.

== Overview ==
Rangers played a total of 53 competitive matches during the 1995–96 season. The team finished first in the Scottish Premier Division and won its eighth consecutive league title.

In the cup competitions, the team won the Scottish Cup, beating Heart of Midlothian 5–1. Rangers were knocked out the Scottish League Cup by Aberdeen at the semi-final stage, losing 2–1.

The side reached the group stages of the UEFA Champions League this season and were drawn into a group with Juventus, Borussia Dortmund and Romanian side Steaua București. After six matches, three draws and three defeats, Rangers were bottom of the table and exited the competition.

Aided by the sale of Duncan Ferguson the previous season, between July and February manager Walter Smith spent nearly £12 million on rebuilding his squad by signing the likes of Peter van Vossen, Paul Gascoigne (a then Scottish record signing at £4.3 million), Stephen Wright and Gordan Petrić. Basile Boli and Oleg Salenko left the club.

Gascoigne was voted player of the year having scored a total of 19 goals in all competitions.

November saw the departure of Mark Hateley as he returned to England in a £1.5 million move to Queen's Park Rangers – the largest fee paid for a 34-year-old at this time. Hateley had lost his place in the first team to Gordon Durie who partnered Ally McCoist after two seasons mostly spent on the sidelines due to injuries.

== Transfers ==
=== In ===
Date	Player	From	Fee
5 July 1995	(Scotland) Stephen Wright	(Scotland) Aberdeen	£1,500,000
10 July 1995	(England) Paul Gascoigne	(Italy) Lazio	£4,300,000
26 July 1995	(Federal Republic of Yugoslavia) Gordan Petrić	(Scotland) Dundee United	£1,500,000
28 July 1995	(Russia) Oleg Salenko	(Spain) Valencia	£2,500,000
13 November 1995	(Scotland) Derek McInnes	(Scotland) Greenock Morton	£300,000
16 January 1996	(Netherlands) Peter van Vossen	(Turkey) İstanbulspor	Swap
29 February 1996	(Denmark) Erik Bo Andersen	(Denmark) Aalborg Bk	£1,200,000
29 March 1996	(Netherlands) Theo Snelders	(Scotland) Aberdeen	£200,000

=== Out ===
Date	Player	To	Fee
16 June 1995	(Scotland) Ally Maxwell	(Scotland) Dundee United	£250,000
15 August 1995	(France) Basile Boli	(France) AS Monaco	£2,000,000
25 September 1995	(England) Mark Hateley	(England) Queens Park Rangers	£1,500,000
16 January 1996	(Russia) Oleg Salenko	(Turkey) İstanbulspor	Swap
11 March 1996	(Scotland) Brian Reid	(Scotland) Greenock Morton	£150,000

- Expenditure: ▼£11,500,000
- Income: ▲£3,900,000
- Total loss/gain: ▼£7,600,000

== Results ==
All results are written with Rangers' score first.

=== Ibrox International Challenge Trophy ===
Date	Opponent	Venue	Result	Attendance	Scorers
29 July 1995	(Romania) Steaua București	H	4–0		Ferguson, Gascoigne, Hateley, McCoist
30 July 1995	(Italy) Sampdoria	H	2–0		Durie, McCoist

=== Scottish Premier Division ===
Date	Opponent	Venue	Result	Attendance	Scorers
26 August 1995	Kilmarnock	H	1–0	44,686	McCall
9 September 1995	Raith Rovers	H	4–0	43,535	McCoist (2), Miller, Robertson
16 September 1995	Falkirk	A	2–0	11,445	Salenko, Robertson
23 September 1995	Hibernian	H	0–1	44,364	
30 September 1995	Celtic	A	2–0	34,500	Cleland, Gascoigne
3 October 1995	Motherwell	H	2–1	37,348	Gascoigne, McCoist
7 October 1995	Aberdeen	A	1–0	22,500	Moore
14 October 1995	Partick Thistle	A	4–0	16,346	Durie (3), Gough
21 October 1995	Heart of Midlothian	H	4–1	45,155	Salenko (2), Gascoigne, Durie
28 October 1995	Raith Rovers	A	2–2	9,200	Gough, Petric
4 November 1995	Falkirk	H	2–0	42,059	McCoist (2)
8 November 1995	Kilmarnock	A	2–0	14,823	McLaren, Salenko
11 November 1995	Aberdeen	H	1–1	45,427	Salenko
19 November 1995	Celtic	H	3–3	46,640	Laudrup, McCoist, McKinlay (o.g.)
25 November 1995	Hibernian	A	4–1	13,558	McCoist, Miller, Durie, Dods (o.g.)
2 December 1995	Heart of Midlothian	A	2–0	15,105	McCoist (pen.), Gascoigne
9 December 1995	Partick Thistle	H	1–0	43,173	Durie
19 December 1995	Motherwell	A	0–0	10,179	
26 December 1995	Kilmarnock	H	3–0	45,173	Salenko, Durie (pen.), Gascoigne
30 December 1995	Hibernian	H	7–0	44,692	Durie (4), Miller, Gascoigne, Salenko
3 January 1996	Celtic	A	0–0	37,000	
6 January 1996	Falkirk	A	4–0	10,581	McCoist (2, 1 (pen.)), Durie, Robertson
13 January 1996	Raith Rovers	H	4–0	42,498	Durie (2), McCoist, Ferguson
20 January 1996	Heart of Midlothian	H	0–3	45,096	
3 February 1996	Partick Thistle	A	2–1	16,253	Gascoigne (2)
10 February 1996	Motherwell	H	3–2	45,566	Ferguson, McLaren, McCoist (pen.)
25 February 1996	Aberdeen	A	1–0	21,000	Gascoigne (pen.)
3 March 1996	Hibernian	A	2–0	11,954	Laudrup (pen.), Mitchell (o.g.)
17 March 1996	Celtic	H	1–1	47,312	McLaren
23 March 1996	Falkirk	H	3–2	46,014	Andersen (2), Gascoigne
30 March 1996	Raith Rovers	A	4–2	9,300	McCoist (3, 1 (pen.)), Durie (pen.)
10 April 1996	Heart of Midlothian	A	0–2	15,350	
13 April 1996	Partick Thistle	H	5–0	46,438	Andersen (3), McCall, Gough
20 April 1996	Motherwell	A	3–1	13,128	McCall, Andersen, Gascoigne
28 April 1996	Aberdeen	H	3–1	47,247	Gascoigne (3, 1 (pen.))
4 May 1996	Kilmarnock	A	3–0	17,056	Durie (2), McCoist

=== Scottish League Cup ===
Date	Round	Opponent	Venue	Result	Attendance	Scorers
19 August 1995	R2	Greenock Morton	H	3–0	42,941	McCoist, Hateley, Gascoigne
30 August 1995	R3	Stirling Albion	H	3–2	46,686	Hateley, McCall, McCoist
19 September 1995	QF	Celtic	A	1–0	32,789	McCoist
24 October 1995	SF	Aberdeen	N	1–2	26,131	Salenko

=== Scottish Cup ===
Date	Round	Opponent	Venue	Result	Attendance	Scorers
27 January 1996	R3	Keith	N	10–1	15,461	Ferguson (3), Cleland (3), Durie (pen.), Robertson, Miller, Mikhailichenko
15 February 1996	R4	Clyde	A	4–1	5,722	Miller (2), Van Vossen, Gascoigne
9 March 1996	QF	Caledonian Thistle	N	3–0	11,296	Gascoigne (2), Thomson (o.g.)
7 April 1996	SF	Celtic	N	2–1	36,333	McCoist, Laudrup
18 May 1996	F	Heart of Midlothian	N	5–1	37,760	Durie (3), Laudrup (2)

=== UEFA Champions League ===
Date	Round	Opponent	Venue	Result	Attendance	Scorers
9 August 1995	QR	(Cyprus) Anorthosis Famagusta	H	1–0	43,519	Durie
23 August 1995	QR	(Cyprus) Anorthosis Famagusta	A	0–0	12,000	
13 September 1995	GS	(Romania) Steaua Bucharest	A	0–1	26,000	
27 September 1995	GS	(Germany) Borussia Dortmund	H	2–2	33,209	Gough, Ferguson
18 October 1995	GS	(Italy) Juventus	A	1–4	49,825	Gough
1 November 1995	GS	(Italy) Juventus	H	0–4	42,523	
22 November 1995	GS	(Romania) Steaua Bucharest	H	1–1	30,800	Gascoigne
6 December 1995	GS	(Germany) Borussia Dortmund	A	2–2	35,800	Laudrup, Durie

== Appearances ==
Player	Position	Appearances	Goals
(Scotland) Andy Goram	GK	47	0
(Scotland) Colin Scott	GK	3	0
(Netherlands) Theo Snelders	GK	2	0
(Scotland) Billy Thomson	GK	2	0
(Scotland) Alec Cleland	DF	36	4
(Scotland) Gary Bollan	DF	7	0
(Scotland) John Brown	DF	22	0
(Scotland) Richard Gough	DF	42	5
(Scotland) Alan McLaren	DF	49	3
(Australia) Craig Moore	DF	16	1
(Federal Republic of Yugoslavia) Gordan Petrić	DF	46	1
(Scotland) David Robertson	DF	38	3
(Scotland) Brian Reid	DF	1	0
(Scotland) Greg Shields	DF	1	0
(Scotland) Stephen Wright	DF	16	0
(Scotland) Ian Durrant	MF	26	0
(Scotland) Ian Ferguson	MF	25	6
(England) Paul Gascoigne	MF	42	19
(Denmark) Brian Laudrup	MF	33	6
(Scotland) Stuart McCall	MF	33	4
(Scotland) Brian McGinty	MF	2	0
(Scotland) Derek McInnes	MF	6	0
(Scotland) Charlie Miller	MF	36	3
(Ukraine) Oleksiy Mykhaylychenko	MF	15	1
(Scotland) Neil Murray	MF	9	0
(England) Trevor Steven	MF	7	0
(Denmark) Erik Bo Andersen	FW	6	6
(Scotland) Gordon Durie	FW	38	23
(England) Mark Hateley	FW	4	2
(Scotland) Ally McCoist	FW	37	20
(Russia) Oleg Salenko	FW	20	8
(Netherlands) Peter van Vossen	FW	9	1

== Competitions ==
=== Overall ===
Competition	First match	Last match	Starting round	Final position	Record							
Competition	First match	Last match	Starting round	Final position	Pld	W	D	L	GF	GA	GD	Win %
Scottish Premier Division	26 August	4 May		Winners	36	27	6	3	85	25	+60	75.00
UEFA Champions League	9 August	6 December	Qualifying round	Group stage	8	1	4	3	6	14	−8	12.50
Scottish Cup	27 January	18 May	Third round	Winners	5	5	0	0	24	4	+20	100.00
Scottish League Cup	19 August	24 October	Second round	Semi–finals	4	3	0	1	8	4	+4	75.00
Total					53	36	10	7	123	47	+76	67.92

Source: Competitions

=== Scottish Premier Division ===
Pos	Team	Pld	W	D	L	GF	GA	GD	Pts	Qualification or relegation
1	Rangers (C)	36	27	6	3	85	25	+60	87	Qualification for the Champions League qualifying round
2	Celtic	36	24	11	1	74	25	+49	83	Qualification for the UEFA Cup qualifying round (Note: Aberdeen qualified for the UEFA Cup by winning the League Cup.)
3	Aberdeen	36	16	7	13	52	45	+7	55	Qualification for the UEFA Cup qualifying round
4	Heart of Midlothian	36	16	7	13	55	53	+2	55	Qualification for the Cup Winners' Cup qualifying round (Note: As Rangers, the winners of the Scottish Cup, qualified for the Champions League via their league position, the place in the Cup Winners' Cup was passed to the cup runner-up, Heart of Midlothian.)
5	Hibernian	36	11	10	15	43	57	−14	43	

Source: Soccerbase
Rules for classification: 1) Points; 2) Goal difference; 3) Goals scored
(C) Champions

=== UEFA Champions league ===
Pos	Team	Pld	W	D	L	GF	GA	GD	Pts	Qualification	JUV	DOR	STE	RAN
1	(Italy) Juventus	6	4	1	1	15	4	+11	13	Advance to knockout stage	—	1–2	3–0	4–1
2	(Germany) Borussia Dortmund	6	2	3	1	8	8	0	9	Advance to knockout stage	1–3	—	1–0	2–2
3	(Romania) Steaua București	6	1	3	2	2	5	−3	6		0–0	0–0	—	1–0
4	(Scotland) Rangers	6	0	3	3	6	14	−8	3		0–4	2–2	1–1	—

Source: UEFA

== See also ==
- Nine in a row
