= 1995–96 Real Madrid CF season =

94th season in existence of Real Madrid CF

Real Madrid C.F.
1995–96 season
- President: Ramón Mendoza (until 20 November 1995); Lorenzo Sanz
- Head coach: Jorge Valdano (until 21 January 1996); Vicente del Bosque (Until 24 January 1996); Arsenio Iglesias
- Stadium: Santiago Bernabéu
- La Liga: 6th
- Copa del Rey: Round of 16
- Supercopa de España: Runners-up
- UEFA Champions League: Quarter-finals
- Top goalscorer: League: Raúl (19 goals); All: Raúl (26 goals)
Home colours	Away colours

The 1995-96 season was the 65th season for Real Madrid CF in La Liga.

== Summary ==
Real Madrid finished its most tumultuous and disastrous domestic season since 1976–77 by finishing in a lowly 6th place. Contrary to the previous nine seasons under the guidance of Leo Beenhakker, John Toshack, Alfredo Di Stéfano, Radomir Antić, Benito Floro, Vicente del Bosque, and Jorge Valdano, Real Madrid's offense malfunctioned as a result of systemic injuries of key players. In November, Ramón Mendoza resigned as president due to economic, social, and sporting problems plaguing the club, with successful Real Madrid director Lorenzo Sanz being promoted to the presidency and tasked with overseeing the club's recovery. Three months later, Jorge Valdano was sacked as a consequence of the team's bad league form and an early Copa del Rey exit, having been eliminated by Espanyol in the round of 16. Former Deportivo La Coruña manager Arsenio Iglesias took over on 24 January 1996.

With Iglesias at the helm, Real Madrid managed to salvage some respectability by reaching the quarter-finals of the Champions League, where they were eliminated by Juventus 2–1 on aggregate, and finishing sixth in the league. The latter technically allowed Madrid to enter the following season's Intertoto Cup (which was staged in the summer and served as a qualifier for the UEFA Cup), but they passed on the opportunity, meaning there would be no European football for Real next season for the first time since 1977.

== Squad ==
Note: Flags indicate national team as defined under FIFA eligibility rules; some limited exceptions apply. Players may hold more than one non-FIFA nationality.

No.	Pos.	Nation	Player
1	GK	ESP	Francisco Buyo
2	DF	ESP	Chendo
3	DF	ESP	Quique Sánchez Flores
4	DF	ESP	Fernando Hierro
5	DF	ESP	Manolo Sanchís
6	MF	ARG	Fernando Redondo
7	FW	ARG	Juan Eduardo Esnáider
8	MF	ESP	Míchel
9	FW	CHI	Iván Zamorano
10	MF	DEN	Michael Laudrup
11	MF	ESP	José Amavisca
12	GK	ESP	Pedro Contreras
13	GK	ESP	Santiago Cañizares
14	MF	ESP	Luis Milla

No.	Pos.	Nation	Player
15	DF	ESP	Nando
17	FW	ESP	Raul
18	DF	ESP	Rafael Alkorta
19	DF	ESP	Mikel Lasa
20	FW	COL	Freddy Rincón
21	MF	ESP	Luis Enrique
22	DF	ESP	Miquel Soler
23	MF	ESP	Sandro
24	MF	ESP	Álvaro
25	MF	ESP	Antonio Gómez
26	MF	ESP	Guti
28	DF	ESP	José García Calvo
29	DF	ESP	Fernando Sanz
31	MF	ESP	Víctor

=== Transfers ===
In
Pos.	Name	from	Type
FW	Juan Eduardo Esnáider	Real Zaragoza	
MF	Freddy Rincón	S.S.C. Napoli	
DF	Miquel Soler	Sevilla FC	
MF	Álvaro Benito	Real Madrid C	
MF	Víctor Sánchez	Real Madrid C	

Out
Pos.	Name	To	Type
FW	Emilio Butragueño	Club Celaya	
FW	Robert Prosinecki	FC Barcelona	
FW	Alfonso Pérez	Real Betis	loan
FW	Dani	Real Zaragoza	loan
MF	Peter Dubovský	Real Oviedo	
MF	Alberto Marcos	Real Valladolid	
MF	Martin Vazquez	Deportivo La Coruña	

==== Winter ====
In
Pos.	Name	from	Type
MF	Dejan Petković	Crvena Zvezda	€2,200,000

Out
Pos.	Name	To	Type
DF	Nando	RCD Espanyol	
MF	Dejan Petković	Sevilla FC	loan

== Competitions ==
=== La Liga ===
==== League table ====
Pos	Team	Pld	W	D	L	GF	GA	GD	Pts	Qualification or relegation
4	Espanyol	42	20	14	8	63	36	+27	74	Qualification for the UEFA Cup first round
5	Tenerife	42	20	12	10	69	54	+15	72	Qualification for the UEFA Cup first round
6	Real Madrid	42	20	10	12	75	51	+24	70	
7	Real Sociedad	42	17	12	13	62	53	+9	63	
8	Real Betis	42	16	14	12	61	54	+7	62	

Source: LFP
Rules for classification: 1) points; 2) head-to-head points; 3) head-to-head goal difference; 4) head-to-head goals scored; 5) goal difference; 6) number of goals scored.

==== Results by round ====
Round	1	2	3	4	5	6	7	8	9	10	11	12	13	14	15	16	17	18	19	20	21	22	23	24	25	26	27	28	29	30	31	32	33	34	35	36	37	38	39	40	41	42
Ground	A	H	A	H	A	H	A	H	A	H	A	H	A	H	A	H	A	A	H	H	A	H	A	H	A	H	A	H	A	H	A	H	A	H	A	H	H	A	H	A	H	H
Result	W	L	L	D	D	L	W	W	W	D	W	L	W	D	W	L	W	L	W	D	D	L	W	W	W	L	D	D	W	L	W	D	L	W	L	W	L	D	W	W	W	W
Position	1	7	13	13	13	15	13	11	6	8	6	7	5	6	5	7	6	7	6	6	7	8	7	6	6	6	7	6	6	8	8	7	8	7	7	7	8	8	6	6	6	6

Source: Competitive matches
A = Away; H = Home; W = Win; D = Draw; L = Loss; = Leader, 1996–97 UEFA Champions League; = 1996–97 UEFA Cup; = 1996 UEFA Intertoto Cup (Real Madrid refused berth)

==== Matches ====
2 September 1995 1	Rayo Vallecano	1–5	Real Madrid	Madrid
	Alves 77' (yellow card); Cortillo (yellow card) 52' (yellow-red card); Cota (yellow card) 84' (yellow-red card); González (yellow card); Lema (yellow card)	Report	Amavisca 29'; Sandro 54'; Hierro 66'; Hierro 71'; Quique Sánchez Flores 86'; Luis Enrique (yellow card); Luis Milla (yellow card); Juan Esnáider (yellow card)	Stadium: Vallecas; Referee: Juan Arqueo

9 September 1995 2	Real Madrid	1–2	Athletic Bilbao	Madrid
	Raúl 49'; Sanchís (yellow card); Hierro (yellow card); Lasa (yellow card); Amavisca (yellow card); Esnaider (yellow card)	Report	Etxeberria 79'; Ziganda 87'; Tabuenko (yellow card); Goicoechea (yellow card)	Stadium: Estadio Santiago Bernabéu; Referee: Arturo Ibañez

16 September 1995 3	Real Madrid	2–3	Real Oviedo	Madrid
	Zamorano 2' (yellow card); Zamorano 29'; Amavisca (yellow card)	Report	González 9'; González 43'; Rivas 47'; Ania (yellow card); Manel (yellow card); Cano (yellow card); Yercan (yellow card); Alvarez (yellow card)	Stadium: Estadio Santiago Bernabéu; Referee: Eduardo González

22 September 1995 4	Real Betis	0–0	Real Madrid	Seville
	Josete (yellow card); José Mari (yellow card); Merino (yellow card)	Report	Quique Sánchez Flores (yellow card) 63' (yellow-red card); Sanchís (yellow card); Redondo (yellow card)	Stadium: Estadio Benito Villamarin; Referee: Cesar Montero

30 September 1995 5	Real Madrid	1–1	FC Barcelona	Madrid
	Raúl 12'; Luis Enrique (yellow card); Sanchís (yellow card); Hierro (yellow card)	Report	García 31'; Sergi (yellow card) 89' (yellow-red card); Bakero (yellow card); Kodro (yellow card); Carreras (yellow card); Guardiola (yellow card); Celades (yellow card)	Stadium: Estadio Santiago Bernabéu; Referee: Antonio López Nieto

4 October 1995 6	Valencia CF	4–3	Real Madrid	Valencia
	Galvez 24'; Fernando 29'; Mijatović 39'; Arroyo 83'; Ferreira (yellow card) 67' (yellow-red card); Zubizarreta (yellow card); Engonga (yellow card)	Report	Laudrup 51' (pen.) (yellow card); Alkorta 65' (yellow card); Míchel 89'; Redondo (yellow card)	Stadium: Mestalla; Referee: Jose Azurmendi

8 October 1995 7	Real Madrid	2–1	SD Compostela	Madrid
	Hierro 27'; Zamorano 28'; Amavisca (yellow card)	Report	Ramón 10'; Villena (yellow card); Eraña (yellow card)	Stadium: Estadio Santiago Bernabéu; Referee: Juan Roca

15 October 1995 8	UD Salamanca	0–2	Real Madrid	Villares de la Reina
	Tamiz (yellow card)	Report	Zamorano 12'; Amavisca 72'; Luis Milla (yellow card) 44' (yellow-red card); Soler (yellow card); Hierro (yellow card); Raúl (yellow card)	Stadium: Estadio El Helmántico; Referee: José García

22 October 1995 9	Real Madrid	2–0	CD Tenerife	Madrid
	Esnáider 10'; Sandro 83'; Sanchís (yellow card); Hierro (yellow card)	Report	Miñambres (yellow card); Chano (yellow card)	Stadium: Estadio Santiago Bernabéu; Referee: Juan Marin

27 October 1995 10	Albacete Balompié	1–1	Real Madrid	Albacete
	Maqueda 87' (yellow card); Salvador (yellow card); Bjelica (yellow card); Luque (yellow card)	Report	Raúl 44'; Alkorta (yellow card) 82' (yellow-red card); Chendo (yellow card)	Stadium: Estadio Carlos Belmonte; Referee: José Sevilla

3 November 1995 11	Real Madrid	3–2	Real Sociedad	Madrid
	Raúl 39'; Laudrup 52'; Michel 85' (pen.)	Report	De Pedro 75'; Idiakez 83'; De Paula (yellow card)	Stadium: Estadio Santiago Bernabéu; Referee: Miguel Lopez

11 November 1995 12	Racing Santander	2–0	Real Madrid	Santander
	Moreno 25'; Adepojou 79'; Billabona (yellow card); Merino (yellow card)	Report	Rincón (yellow card); Esnáider (yellow card)	Stadium: El Sardinero; Referee: Celino Redondo

17 November 1995 13	Real Madrid	1–0	Atlético de Madrid	Madrid
	Raúl 9'; Sanchís (yellow card); Alkorta (yellow card); Luis Enrique (yellow card); Zamorano (yellow card)	Report	Caminero (yellow card) (yellow-red card); Santi Denia (yellow card); Simeone (yellow card); Penev (yellow card)	Stadium: Santiago Bernabéu; Referee: Díaz Vega

25 November 1995 14	Sporting Gijón	0–0	Real Madrid	Gijón
	Prendes (yellow card); Pérez (yellow card)	Report	Chendo (yellow card); Nando (yellow card); Esnáider (yellow card)	Stadium: Estadio El Molinón; Referee: José Fuente

1 December 1995 15	Real Madrid	4–1	Sevilla FC	Madrid
	Alkorta 1'; Alvaro Benito 13'; Raúl 21'; Raúl 58'; Mikel Lasa (yellow card); Luis Milla (yellow card)	Report	Suker (red card) 40'; Moya 49'; Tevenet (yellow card); Pedro (yellow card); Prieto (yellow card)	Stadium: Estadio Santiago Bernabéu; Referee: Fernando Mendez

9 December 1995 16	RCD Espanyol	3–1	Real Madrid	Barcelona
	Alfaro 16'; Benitez 75' (yellow card); Lardín 83'; Herrera (yellow card); Parralo (yellow card); Pochettino (yellow card)	Report	Laudrup 88'; Sanchís (yellow card); Sánchez Flores (yellow card); Lasa (yellow card)	Stadium: Sarrià; Referee: Manuel González

16 December 1995 17	Real Madrid	1–0	Celta Vigo	Madrid
	Alvaro Benito 29'; Hierro (yellow card)	Report	Salgado (yellow card) 88' (yellow-red card); Hoyas (yellow card); Aguirrechu (yellow card); Indias (yellow card); Alvarez (yellow card)	Stadium: Estadio Santiago Bernabéu; Referee: Arturo Ibañez

20 December 1995 18	Deportivo La Coruña	3–0	Real Madrid	A Coruña
	Bebeto 13'; Bebeto 41'; Bebeto 43'; Nando (yellow card)	Report	Amavisca (yellow card); Luis Milla (yellow card); Lasa (yellow card)	Stadium: Estadio Riazor; Referee: José Valdivieso

2 January 1996 19	Real Madrid	4–1	Real Valladolid	Madrid
	Gómez 35'; Hierro 40' (pen.); Hierro 43' (pen.) (yellow card); Zamorano 50'	Report	Fernando 26'; Sanchez (yellow card); Peternac (yellow card); Marcos (red card) 44'	Stadium: Estadio Santiago Bernabéu; Referee: Selino Redondo

6 January 1996 20	CP Mérida	2–2	Real Madrid	Mérida
	Prieto 28'; Luis 54'; Sierra (yellow card); Lopez (yellow card); Correa (yellow card)	Report	5' (yellow card) Gómez; (yellow card) Hierro	Stadium: Estadio Romano; Referee: Eduardo Gonzalez

13 January 1996 21	Real Madrid	2–2	Real Zaragoza	Madrid
	Zamorano 83'; Amavisca 89'; Rincón (yellow card)	Report	41'Morientes; 67'Rambert; (yellow card) Aragón; (yellow card) Poyet; (yellow card) Fernandez	Stadium: Estadio Santiago Bernabéu; Referee: Jose Azurmendi

20 January 1996 22	Real Madrid	1–2	Rayo Vallecano	Madrid
	Raúl 4'; Laudrup (yellow card); Rincón (yellow card); Lasa (yellow card); Alkorta (yellow card)	Report	1' Guilherme; 63' Guilherme; (yellow card) Baroha; (yellow card) Cortillo; (yellow card) Palacios; (yellow card) Andrajevic; (yellow card) Castillo	Stadium: Estadio Santiago Bernabéu; Referee: Juan Roca

23 January 1996 23	Athletic Bilbao	0–5	Real Madrid	Bilbao
		Report	14' Zamorano; 58', 77' Laudrup; 74' Raúl; 88' Luis Milla; (yellow card) Alkorta	Stadium: San Mamés; Referee: Manuel Díaz Vega

27 January 1996 24	Real Oviedo	1–2	Real Madrid	Oviedo
	Carlos 37'; Suarez (yellow card); Cano (yellow card)	Report	7', 83' Raúl; (yellow card) Lasa; (red card) 33'Luis Enrique	Stadium: Carlos Tartiere; Referee: Evaristo Leira

3 February 1996 25	Real Madrid	4–2	Real Betis	Madrid
	Sanchis 7'; Raúl 39'; Zamorano 53'; Redondo 74'; Michel (yellow card); Lasa (yellow card); Hierro (yellow card); Buyo (yellow card)	Report	28' (yellow card) Stosic; 33' Alfonso; (yellow card) Cuyesada; (yellow card) Merino; (yellow card) Jarni	Stadium: Estadio Santiago Bernabéu; Referee: Juan Arqueo

9 February 1996 26	FC Barcelona	3–0	Real Madrid	Barcelona
	Kodro 36'; Kodro 89'; Figo 71'; (yellow card) Popescu	Report		Stadium: Camp Nou; Referee: Miguel Lopez

16 February 1996 27	Real Madrid	0–0	Valencia CF	Madrid
	Sanchís (yellow card)	Report	(yellow card) Poyatos	Stadium: Estadio Santiago Bernabéu; Referee: Manuel González

24 February 1996 28	SD Compostela	3–3	Real Madrid	Santiago de Compostela
	Fabiano 45'; Christensen 61' (yellow card); Ramon (yellow card) 87' (yellow-red card); Hernández 89'; Nacho (yellow card); García (yellow card)	Report	16' (yellow card) Zamorano; 48' (yellow card) Raúl; 55' (yellow card) 89' (yellow-red card) Hierro; (yellow card) Sanchís; (yellow card) Redondo; (yellow card) Luis Enrique	Stadium: Multiusos de San Lázaro; Referee: José García

1 March 1996 29	Real Madrid	5–0	UD Salamanca	Madrid
	Raúl 26'; Zamorano 41'; Zamorano 78'; Laudrup 78'; Luis Enrique 89'; Luis Milla (yellow card)	Report	(yellow card) Del Solar; (yellow card) Medina	Stadium: Estadio Santiago Bernabéu; Referee: Jose Sevilla

9 March 1996 30	CD Tenerife	3–0	Real Madrid	Santa Cruz de Tenerife
	Robaina 44' (yellow card); Pizzi 54'; Pizzi 87'; Miñambres (yellow card)	Report	(yellow card) 42' (yellow-red card) Alkorta; (yellow card) García Calvo; (yellow card) Raúl; (yellow card) Luis Milla; (red card) 57' Hierro	Stadium: Estadio Heliodoro Rodriguez; Referee: Arturo Ibañez

15 March 1996 31	Real Madrid	2–0	Albacete Balompié	Madrid
	Luis Enrique 29'; Buyo 64'; Raúl 89'; García Calvo (yellow card); Fernando Sanz (yellow card); Laudrup (yellow card); Rincón (yellow card)	Report	(yellow card) Verdu; (yellow card) Bjelitsa	Stadium: Estadio Santiago Bernabéu; Referee: Juan Marin

23 March 1996 32	Real Sociedad	1–1	Real Madrid	San Sebastián
	García (yellow card); Pikabea (yellow card)	Report	32' Raúl; (yellow card) Fernando Sanz	Stadium: Estadio Anoeta; Referee: Manuel Vega

26 March 1996 33	Real Madrid	1–2	Racing Santander	Madrid
	Michel 67' (pen.); Fernando Sanz (yellow card)	Report	56' Álvaro Cervera; 86' (yellow card) Merino; (yellow card) Ceballos; (yellow card) Chema; Torre (yellow card)	Stadium: Estadio Santiago Bernabéu; Referee: Evaristo Leira

29 March 1996 34	Atlético de Madrid	1–2	Real Madrid	Madrid
	Simeone (red card) 55'; Pantic 84'; Santi Denia (yellow card)	Report	26' (yellow card) Soler; 63' (yellow card) Laudrup; (yellow card) García Calvo; (yellow card) Fernando Sanz; (yellow card) 83' (yellow-red card) Hierro	Stadium: Estadio Vicente Calderón; Referee: Fernando Mendez

5 April 1996 35	Real Madrid	0–1	Sporting Gijón	Madrid
		Report	13' (yellow card) Velasco; Acebal (yellow card); Banjo (yellow card); Riopedre (yellow card)	Stadium: Estadio Santiago Bernabéu; Referee: Eduardo González

12 April 1996 36	Sevilla FC	0–1	Real Madrid	Seville
	Galván (yellow card); Martagon (yellow card); Suker (yellow card)	Report	Laudrup 82'; Luis Enrique (yellow card)	Stadium: Estadio Sánchez Pizjuán; Referee: Jose Azurmendi

20 April 1996 37	Real Madrid	1–2	RCD Espanyol	Madrid
	Raúl 52'; Sanz (yellow card); García Calvo (yellow card)	Report	Lardín 50', 53'; Bogdanovic (yellow card); Arteaga (yellow card); Pochettino (yellow card)	Stadium: Estadio Santiago Bernabéu; Referee: Antonio Nieto

27 April 1996 38	Celta Vigo	1–1	Real Madrid	Vigo
	Ginés Sánchez 12'; Aguirretxu (yellow card) 36' (yellow-red card); Salinas (yellow card); Indias (yellow card)	Report	Zamorano 11'; Alkorta (yellow card)	Stadium: Estadio Balaídos; Referee: Juan Roca

4 May 1996 39	Real Madrid	1–0	Deportivo La Coruña	Madrid
	Luis Enrique 61'; Raúl (yellow card); Quique Sánchez Flores (yellow card)	Report	Voro (yellow card); Da Silva (yellow card)	Stadium: Estadio Santiago Bernabéu; Referee: Jose Garcia

11 May 1996 40	Real Valladolid	0–3	Real Madrid	Valladolid
	Gutierrez (yellow card); Ibañez (yellow card)	Report	Lasa 78' (yellow card); Raúl 80'; Guti 84'; Hierro (yellow card)	Stadium: Estadio José Zorrilla; Referee: Manuel Vega

18 May 1996 41	Real Madrid	4–0	CP Mérida	Madrid
	Míchel 13' (pen.); Raúl 27'; Ivan Perez 29'; Míchel 72'; Quique Sánchez Flores (yellow card); Laudrup (yellow card)	Report	Corino (yellow card) 35' (yellow-red card); Correa (yellow card); Leal (yellow card)	Stadium: Estadio Santiago Bernabéu; Referee: Juan Roca

24 May 1996 42	Real Zaragoza	0–1	Real Madrid	Zaragoza
	Poyet (yellow card); Nayim (yellow card); Sanjuan (yellow card); Cáceres (yellow card); Belsué (yellow card); Juanmi (yellow card)	Report	19' (pen.) Hierro; Sanchís (yellow card); Alkorta (yellow card)	Stadium: Estadio La Romareda; Referee: Juan Marin

=== Copa del Rey ===
==== Round of 16 ====
11 January 1996	RCD Espanyol	4–1	Real Madrid	Barcelona
20:30 CET		Report		Stadium: Estadio Sarriá

18 January 1996	Real Madrid	2–1	RCD Espanyol	Madrid
20:30 CET				Stadium: Estadio Santiago Bernabéu

=== UEFA Champions League ===
==== Group D ====
Pos	Team	Pld	W	D	L	GF	GA	GD	Pts	Qualification	AJX	RMA	FER	GRA
1	(Netherlands) Ajax	6	5	1	0	15	1	+14	16	Advance to knockout stage	—	1–0	4–0	3–0
2	(Spain) Real Madrid	6	3	1	2	11	5	+6	10	Advance to knockout stage	0–2	—	6–1	2–0
3	(Hungary) Ferencváros	6	1	2	3	9	19	−10	5		1–5	1–1	—	3–3
4	(Switzerland) Grasshopper	6	0	2	4	3	13	−10	2		0–0	0–2	0–3	—

Source: UEFA

12 September 1995	AFC Ajax (Netherlands)	1–0	(Spain) Real Madrid	Amsterdam
		Report

27 September 1995	Real Madrid (Spain)	2–0	(Switzerland) Grasshopper Club Zürich	Madrid
		Report		Stadium: Estadio Santiago Bernabéu

18 October 1995	Real Madrid (Spain)	6–1	(Hungary) Ferencvárosi TC	Madrid
		Report		Stadium: Estadio Santiago Bernabéu

1 November 1995	Ferencvárosi TC (Hungary)	1–1	(Spain) Real Madrid	Budapest
		Report

22 November 1995	Real Madrid (Spain)	0–2	(Netherlands) AFC Ajax	Madrid
		Report		Stadium: Estadio Santiago Bernabéu

5 December 1995	Grasshopper Club Zürich (Switzerland)	0–2	(Spain) Real Madrid	Zürich
		Report

==== Quarter-finals ====
6 March 1996	Real Madrid (Spain)	1–0	(Italy) Juventus	Madrid
20:30	Raúl 20'	Report		Stadium: Santiago Bernabéu Stadium; Attendance: 65,000; Referee: (Switzerland) Kurt Röthlisberger

20 March 1996	Juventus (Italy)	2–0 (2–1 agg.)	(Spain) Real Madrid	Turin
20:30	Del Piero 17'; Padovano 54'	Report		Stadium: Stadio delle Alpi; Attendance: 69,041; Referee: (Netherlands) Mario van der Ende

=== Supercopa de España ===
24 August 1995	Deportivo La Coruña	3–0	Real Madrid	A Coruña
22:00 CET	Donato 55' (pen.); Fran 60'; Bebeto 65'			Stadium: Riazor; Attendance: 25,000; Referee: Ansuátegui Roca

27 August 1995	Real Madrid	1–2	Deportivo La Coruña	Madrid
22:00 CET	Hierro 30'		Manjarín 81'; Begiristain 87'	Stadium: Santiago Bernabéu; Attendance: 25,000; Referee: López Nieto

== Statistics ==
=== Squad statistics ===
No.	Pos	Nat	Player	Total		La Liga		Copa		Champions League	
No.	Pos	Nat	Player	Apps	Goals	Apps	Goals	Apps	Goals	Apps	Goals
1	GK	(Spain) ESP	Buyo	40	-53	31	-43	2	-5	7	-5
3	DF	(Spain) ESP	Quique Sánchez	42	1	26+7	1	2	0	6+1	0
4	DF	(Spain) ESP	Hierro	38	8	31	7	2	0	5	1
18	DF	(Spain) ESP	Alkorta	31	2	22+4	2	0	0	4+1	0
5	DF	(Spain) ESP	Sanchis	40	1	32	1	2	0	6	0
6	DM	(Argentina) ARG	Redondo	29	2	21+2	2	2	0	4	0
21	MF	(Spain) ESP	Luis Enrique	39	3	28+3	3	0	0	5+3	0
14	MF	(Spain) ESP	Milla	37	0	24+8	0	0	0	4+1	0
10	AM	(Denmark) DEN	Laudrup	35	8	26+2	8	0	0	7	0
9	FW	(Chile) CHI	Zamorano	36	16	27+2	12	2	0	5	4
17	FW	(Spain) ESP	Raúl	50	26	40	19	2	1	8	6
13	GK	(Spain) ESP	Cañizares	14	-10	11+1	-8	0+1	0	1	-2
11	MF	(Spain) ESP	Amavisca	33	3	20+5	3	0+2	0	6	0
2	DF	(Spain) ESP	Chendo	27	0	20+3	0	0	0	4	0
19	DF	(Spain) ESP	Lasa	29	1	19+4	1	2	0	4	0
22	DF	(Spain) ESP	Soler	18	1	14	1	0	0	3+1	0
29	DF	(Spain) ESP	Sanz	13	0	11+2	0	0	0	0	0
28	DF	(Spain) ESP	García Calvo	12	0	10	0	0	0	2	0
24	MF	(Spain) ESP	Alvaro	16	2	9+5	2	2	0	0	0
20	MF	(Colombia) COL	Rincón	19	0	9+5	0	1	0	1+3	0
8	MF	(Spain) ESP	Míchel	42	8	8+25	6	0+1	1	3+5	1
7	FW	(Argentina) ARG	Esnáider	26	1	8+12	1	1+1	0	2+2	0
23	MF	(Spain) ESP	Sandro	10	2	5+4	2	0	0	1	0
26	MF	(Spain) ESP	Guti	9	1	4+5	1	0	0	0	0
27	MF	(Spain) ESP	Gomez	8	2	3+3	2	2	0	0	0
15	DF	(Spain) ESP	Nando	3	0	2	0	0	0	0+1	0
30	FW	(Spain) ESP	Ivan	3	1	1+2	1	0	0	0	0
31	MF	(Spain) ESP	Víctor	1	0	0+1	0	0	0	0	0
12	MF	(Federal Republic of Yugoslavia) YUG	Petkovic	3	0	0+3	0	0	0	0	0
25	GK	(Spain) ESP	Contreras	0	0	0	0	0	0	0	0

- Source: https://www.bdfutbol.com/en/t/t1995-962.html
