= 1996 UEFA Champions League final =

Association football match

- Match programme cover
- Event: 1995–96 UEFA Champions League
Ajax	Juventus
(Netherlands)	(Italy)
1	1
- After extra time Juventus won 4–2 on penalties
- Date: 22 May 1996
- Venue: Stadio Olimpico, Rome
- Referee: Manuel Díaz Vega (Spain)
- Attendance: 70,000

The 1996 UEFA Champions League final was a football match played on 22 May 1996 between title holders Ajax of the Netherlands and Juventus of Italy. The match ended in a 1–1 draw after extra time, forcing a penalty shoot-out, which Juventus won 4–2. It was the club's second and most recent triumph in the competition. As of 2026, this is the last time a Dutch team appeared in a Champions League final.

== Background ==
The match was a repeat of the 1973 final, making it the fourth repeated final pairing. Ajax won the 1973 final 1–0. Ajax was defending the title, having won in 1995 when they defeated Milan 1–0.

Juventus had not featured in the Champions League for nine years until this edition of the tournament. Juventus reached their fourth final. In the semi-finals, Juventus eliminated French side Nantes, with a 2-0 victory in the first leg at home, and 3–2 defeat in the return leg. Previously Juventus won the final in 1985, and lost in 1973 and 1983.

Ajax reached their sixth final. In the semi-finals, Ajax eliminated Greek side Panathinaikos; they lost the first leg 1–0 at home, but won 3–0 in the second leg. Previously Ajax won the finals in 1971, 1972, 1973 and 1995, and lost in 1969.

Juventus entered the final as 1995–96 Serie A runners-up to Milan, as well as 1995 Supercoppa Italiana winners. Ajax entered the final as 1995–96 Eredivisie champions, 1995 Dutch Supercup winners, 1995 UEFA Super Cup and 1995 Intercontinental Cup winners.

== Route to the final ==
(Netherlands) Ajax				Round	(Italy) Juventus			
Opponent	Result			Group stage	Opponent	Result		
(Spain) Real Madrid	1–0 (H)			Matchday 1	(Germany) Borussia Dortmund	3–1 (A)		
(Hungary) Ferencváros	5–1 (A)			Matchday 2	(Romania) Steaua București	3–0 (H)		
(Switzerland) Grasshopper	3–0 (H)			Matchday 3	(Scotland) Rangers	4–1 (H)		
(Switzerland) Grasshopper	0–0 (A)			Matchday 4	(Scotland) Rangers	4–0 (A)		
(Spain) Real Madrid	2–0 (A)			Matchday 5	(Germany) Borussia Dortmund	1–2 (H)		
(Hungary) Ferencváros	4–0 (H)			Matchday 6	(Romania) Steaua București	0–0 (A)		
Group D winner: Pos / Team / Pld / Pts; 1 / (Netherlands) Ajax / 6 / 16; 2 / (Spain) Real Madrid / 6 / 10; 3 / (Hungary) Ferencváros / 6 / 5; 4 / (Switzerland) Grasshopper / 6 / 2; Source: UEFA				Final standings	Group C winner: Pos / Team / Pld / Pts; 1 / (Italy) Juventus / 6 / 13; 2 / (Germany) Borussia Dortmund / 6 / 9; 3 / (Romania) Steaua București / 6 / 6; 4 / (Scotland) Rangers / 6 / 3; Source: UEFA			
Opponent	Agg.	1st leg	2nd leg	Knockout phase	Opponent	Agg.	1st leg	2nd leg
(Germany) Borussia Dortmund	3–0	2–0 (A)	1–0 (H)	Quarter-finals	(Spain) Real Madrid	2–1	0–1 (A)	2–0 (H)
(Greece) Panathinaikos	3–1	0–1 (H)	3–0 (A)	Semi-finals	(France) Nantes	4–3	2–0 (H)	2–3 (A)

== Match ==
=== Summary ===
The start of the match was dominated by Juventus, while some of the young Ajax players committed various errors in this phase. In the 12th minute, Ajax defender Frank de Boer clumsily headed the ball while falling back, allowing Juventus striker Fabrizio Ravanelli to quickly get between de Boer and goalkeeper Edwin van der Sar, who was coming out of his net, and despite the very angled position, slid in the net to give Juventus the lead.

Ajax responded well, pushing further towards Juventus' half, taking advantage of their physical strength. From a corner kick, Nwankwo Kanu forced the Juventus goalkeeper Angelo Peruzzi to make a tough save, only for Ajax to later get a free kick in the 41st minute that surprised Peruzzi who only managed to block the ball which fell at the feet of Jari Litmanen to tap in to equalise. Just before half-time, Antonio Conte was subbed out due to injury, replaced with Vladimir Jugović.

The two teams went into half-time at 1–1, a score that remained unchanged in the second half where the only clear chance was for Juventus captain Gianluca Vialli, who from a very good position shot just wide of the net, as well as a miss from Angelo Di Livio.

After extra-time, the match remained 1–1 and went to penalty shoot-out. The only clear chance in the extra-time was an opportunity missed by Juventus player Alessandro Del Piero in the second half. In the penalty shoot-out, all four Juventus penalty takers scored, with those being Ciro Ferrara, Gianluca Pessotto, Michele Padovano and Jugović. For Ajax, Edgar Davids the first penalty taker's shot was saved by Peruzzi. The next two players scored, those being Litmanen and Arnold Scholten. Their final penalty taken by Sonny Silooy was also saved. Jugović's goal was the decisive penalty that gave Juventus its second title in the competition; Juventus won by a score of 4–2.

=== Details ===
22 May 1996
20:30 UTC+2

Ajax (Netherlands)	1–1 (a.e.t.)	(Italy) Juventus
Litmanen 41'	Report	Ravanelli 12'
Penalties
Davids (penalty missed); Litmanen (penalty scored); Scholten (penalty scored); Silooy (penalty missed)	2–4	(penalty scored) Ferrara; (penalty scored) Pessotto; (penalty scored) Padovano; (penalty scored) Jugović

Stadio Olimpico, Rome
Attendance: 70,000
Referee: Manuel Díaz Vega (Spain)

Ajax	Juventus

GK	1	(Netherlands) Edwin van der Sar
RB	2	(Netherlands) Sonny Silooy
CB	3	(Netherlands) Danny Blind (c)	(yellow card) 83'
DM	4	(Netherlands) Frank de Boer		(substituted off) 69'
LB	5	(Netherlands) Winston Bogarde
RM	6	(Netherlands) Ronald de Boer		(substituted off) 91'
RW	7	(Nigeria) Finidi George	(yellow card) 22'
LM	8	(Netherlands) Edgar Davids
CF	9	(Nigeria) Nwankwo Kanu
AM	10	(Finland) Jari Litmanen
LW	11	(Netherlands) Kiki Musampa		(substituted off) 46'
Substitutions:
GK	12	(Netherlands) Fred Grim
MF	13	(Netherlands) Arnold Scholten		(substituted on) 69'
MF	14	(Netherlands) Dave van den Bergh
FW	15	(Netherlands) Patrick Kluivert		(substituted on) 46'
MF	16	(Netherlands) Nordin Wooter	(yellow card) 92'	(substituted on) 91'
Manager:
(Netherlands) Louis van Gaal

GK	1	(Italy) Angelo Peruzzi
RB	4	(Italy) Moreno Torricelli	(yellow card) 102'
CB	2	(Italy) Ciro Ferrara
CB	5	(Italy) Pietro Vierchowod
LB	3	(Italy) Gianluca Pessotto
CM	7	(France) Didier Deschamps	(yellow card) 87'
DM	6	(Portugal) Paulo Sousa		(substituted off) 57'
CM	8	(Italy) Antonio Conte		(substituted off) 44'
RW	11	(Italy) Fabrizio Ravanelli		(substituted off) 77'
CF	9	(Italy) Gianluca Vialli (c)
LW	10	(Italy) Alessandro Del Piero
Substitutions:
GK	12	(Italy) Michelangelo Rampulla
CB	13	(Italy) Sergio Porrini
LM	14	(Federal Republic of Yugoslavia) Vladimir Jugović	(yellow card) 50'	(substituted on) 44'
RM	15	(Italy) Angelo Di Livio	(yellow card) 106'	(substituted on) 57'
CF	16	(Italy) Michele Padovano		(substituted on) 77'
Manager:
(Italy) Marcello Lippi

Linesmen:
Joaquín Olmos González (Spain)
Manuel Fernando Tresaco Gracia (Spain)
Fourth official:
José María García-Aranda (Spain)

== Post-match ==
Although Juventus won the 1996 Champions League final, the victory remains controversial because of accusations of doping. The Juventus team has been accused of using erythropoietin (EPO) and the matter went to trial in 2004. In November 2004, club doctor Riccardo Agricola was given a 22-month prison sentence and fined €2,000 for sporting fraud by providing performance-enhancing drugs, specifically EPO, to players between 1994 and 1998, Leading hematologist Giuseppe d'Onofrio said that it was "practically certain" that midfielders Antonio Conte and Alessio Tacchinardi had taken EPO to overcome brief bouts of anemia, and that it was "very probable" that seven other players – Alessandro Birindelli, Alessandro Del Piero, Didier Deschamps, Dimas, Paolo Montero, Gianluca Pessotto and Moreno Torricelli – had taken EPO in small doses.

In April 2005, the Court of Arbitration for Sport gave the following advisory opinion, in part: "The use of pharmaceutical substances which are not expressly prohibited by sports law, and which cannot be considered as substances similar or related to those expressly prohibited, is not to be sanctioned by disciplinary measures. However, regardless of the existence or not of any judgement rendered by a State court, sports authorities are under the obligation to prosecute the use of pharmaceutical substances which are prohibited by sports law or any other anti-doping rule violation in order to adopt disciplinary measures." In December 2005, Agricola was acquitted of the charges by Turin's court of appeal. In March 2007, in the final verdict by the Supreme Court of Cassation, stated that "in the years of 1994 to 1998 there was no ascertained positive case of doping substances by Juventus players, that the purchase of erythropoietin or its administration to the athletes of the club does not emerge from any act of the trial, and that the same expert had identified the possibility of an administration of erythropoietin in distant terms from the sure evidence ("very probable" and in two cases "practically certain"): it is that therefore, the judgement of probability and not of certainty, did not allow for a statement of responsibility." The verdict also went on to say: "In response to the conclusion taken, the territorial court notes that there were no deferred values higher than the limits set in the various antidoping protocols and that the situation of the Juventus players, both with reference to the average hematological values, and in relation to that of material balance, did not differ from the national average population.

== See also ==
- 1973 European Cup final – contested by the same teams
- 1996 UEFA Cup Winners' Cup final
- 1996 UEFA Cup final
- 1995–96 AFC Ajax season
- 1995–96 Juventus FC season
- AFC Ajax in international football
- Juventus FC in international football
