= 1995–96 UEFA Champions League =

European football tournament

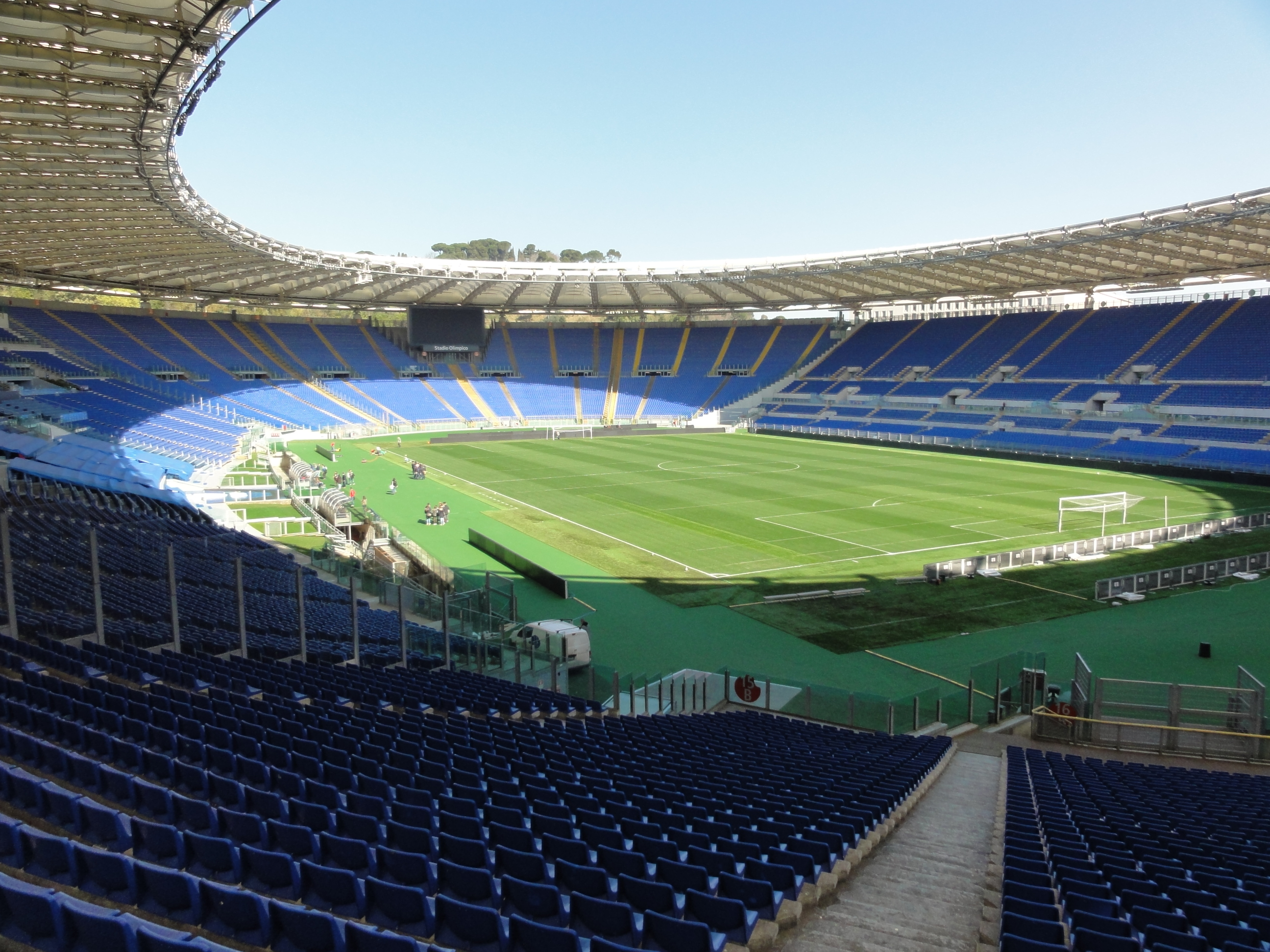
- Stadio Olimpico in Rome held the final.

Tournament details
- Dates: Qualifying: 9–23 August 1995; Competition proper: 13 September 1995 – 22 May 1996
- Teams: Competition proper: 16; Total: 24

Final positions
- Champions: (Italy) Juventus (2nd title)
- Runners-up: (Netherlands) Ajax

Tournament statistics
- Matches played: 61
- Goals scored: 159 (2.61 per match)
- Attendance: 1,870,462 (30,663 per match)
- Top scorer(s): Jari Litmanen (Ajax); 9 goals

The 1995–96 UEFA Champions League was the 41st season of UEFA's premier European club football tournament, and the fourth since its rebranding as the UEFA Champions League. The tournament was won by Juventus, who beat defending champions Ajax on penalties in the final for their first European Cup since 1985, and their second overall. It was the only Champions League title that Juventus won in the 1990s, despite reaching the next two finals, and one of only three Italian wins in the final, despite there being a Serie A club in every final for seven consecutive years from 1992 to 1998.

It was the first tournament in which three points were awarded for a win instead of two.

== Association team allocation ==
24 teams entered the competition – the national champions of each of the top 24 nations in the UEFA coefficient rankings, including UEFA Champions League holders, Ajax. The national champions of the associations ranked 1–7, plus the title holders, all received a bye to the group stage, while the national champions of the associations ranked 8–24 entered in the qualifying round. The remaining national champions from the associations ranked 25–47 were only allowed to participate in the UEFA Cup.

=== Association ranking ===
For the 1995–96 UEFA Champions League, the associations were allocated places according to their 1995 UEFA association coefficients, which took into account their performance in European competitions from 1990–91 to 1994–95.

Association ranking for 1995–96 UEFA Champions League

Rank	Association	Coeff.	Teams	Notes
1	Italy	63.884	1	
2	France	45.283	1	
3	Germany	40.307	1	
4	Spain	39.098	1	
5	England	38.333	1	
6	Portugal	34.000	1	
7	Russia	31.300	1	
8	Belgium	30.400	1	
9	Netherlands	28.450	1	
10	Turkey	23.749	1	
11	Austria	21.450	1	
12	FR Yugoslavia	21.000	0	
13	Greece	20.500	1	
14	Denmark	20.000	1	
15	Sweden	18.000	1	
16	Scotland	16.550	1	
17	Switzerland	15.500	1	

Rank	Association	Coeff.	Teams	Notes
18	Poland	14.916	1	
19	Romania	14.150	1	
20	Norway	12.332	1	
21	Israel	12.166	1	
22	Hungary	11.916	1	
23	Croatia	11.500	1	
24	Cyprus	10.665	1	
25	Ukraine	10.332	1	
26	Georgia	9.000	0	
27	Iceland	8.666	0	
28	Latvia	8.500	0	
29	Finland	8.416	0	
30	Slovakia	7.999	0	
31	Slovenia	7.666	0	
32	Bulgaria	7.583	0	
33	Czech Republic	5.000	0	

Rank	Association	Coeff.	Teams	Notes
34	Wales	5.000	0	
35	Northern Ireland	4.998	0	
36	Republic of Ireland	4.665	0	
37	Belarus	4.000	0	
38	Malta	3.998	0	
39	Albania	3.333	0	
40	Liechtenstein	3.000	0	
41	Lithuania	2.500	0	
42	Luxembourg	1.999	0	
43	Faroe Islands	1.500	0	
44	Macedonia	1.000	0	
45	Armenia	1.000	0	
46	Moldova	1.000	0	
47	Estonia	0.500	0	
48	Azerbaijan	0.000	0	
49	San Marino	0.000	0	

=== Distribution ===
Round	Teams entering in this round	Teams advancing from the previous round
Qualifying round (16 teams)	16 champions from associations 8–25 (except title holders and FR Yugoslavia)	
Group stage (16 teams)	Title holders; 7 champions from associations 1–7	8 winners from the qualifying round
Knockout stage (8 teams)		4 group winners from the group stage; 4 group runners-up from the group stage

Since the title holders (Ajax) qualified for the Champions League qualifying round through their domestic league and entered the group stage automatically, their spot in the qualifying round was vacated. Due to this, as well as Yugoslavia's exclusion, the following changes to the default access list were made:

- The champions of association 24 and 25 (Cyprus and Ukraine) were promoted from the UEFA Cup preliminary round to the Champions League qualifying round.

=== Teams ===
The labels in the parentheses show how each team qualified for the place of its starting round:

- TH: Champions League title holders
- 1st: League position of the previous season

Group stage
(Netherlands) Ajax (1st)^{TH}	(France) Nantes (1st)	(Spain) Real Madrid (1st)	(Portugal) Porto (1st)
(Italy) Juventus (1st)	(Germany) Borussia Dortmund (1st)	(England) Blackburn Rovers (1st)	(Russia) Spartak Moscow (1st)
Qualifying round
(Belgium) Anderlecht (1st)	(Denmark) AaB (1st)	(Poland) Legia Warsaw (1st)	(Hungary) Ferencváros (1st)
(Turkey) Beşiktaş (1st)	(Sweden) IFK Göteborg (1st)	(Romania) Steaua București (1st)	(Croatia) Hajduk Split (1st)
(Austria) Casino Salzburg (1st)	(Scotland) Rangers (1st)	(Norway) Rosenborg (1st)	(Cyprus) Anorthosis Famagusta (1st)
(Greece) Panathinaikos (1st)	(Switzerland) Grasshopper (1st)	(Israel) Maccabi Tel Aviv (1st)	(Ukraine) Dynamo Kyiv (1st)

1. Liechtenstein (LIE): The teams affiliated with the Liechtenstein Football Association (LFV) played in the Swiss football league system, and thus were ineligible for a spot regardless of the association ranking. The only competition organised by the LFV was the Liechtenstein Football Cup – the winners of which qualified for the 1995–96 UEFA Cup Winners' Cup.
2. FR Yugoslavia (YUG): While Yugoslavia's disqualification from European club competitions was lifted, their association coefficient was considered irregular and therefore their champions were not admitted. As a result, the winners of the 1994–95 First League of FR Yugoslavia, Red Star Belgrade, were instead admitted to the 1995–96 UEFA Cup.

== Round and draw dates ==
The schedule of the competition was as follows (all draws were held in Geneva, Switzerland).

Phase	Round	Draw date	First leg	Second leg
Qualifying round		12 July 1995	9 August 1995	23 August 1995
Group stage	Matchday 1	25 August 1995	13 September 1995	
Group stage	Matchday 2	25 August 1995	27 September 1995	
Group stage	Matchday 3	25 August 1995	18 October 1995	
Group stage	Matchday 4	25 August 1995	1 November 1995	
Group stage	Matchday 5	25 August 1995	22 November 1995	
Group stage	Matchday 6	25 August 1995	6 December 1995	
Knockout phase	Quarter-finals	25 August 1995	6 March 1996	20 March 1996
Knockout phase	Semi-finals	25 August 1995	3 April 1996	17 April 1996
Knockout phase	Final	25 August 1995	22 May 1996 at Stadio Olimpico, Rome	

== Qualifying round ==
Dynamo Kyiv won their tie against AaB, but, in their first group game against Panathinaikos, they were accused of a failed attempt to bribe the referee, Antonio López Nieto, to get a win. Despite an appeal, they were ejected from the competition and banned for two years, with AaB replacing them in the group stage. Dynamo's ban was eventually reduced to one season.

Team 1	Agg.	Team 2	1st leg	2nd leg
Grasshopper (Switzerland)	2–1	(Israel) Maccabi Tel Aviv	1–1	1–0
Rangers (Scotland)	1–0	(Cyprus) Anorthosis Famagusta	1–0	0–0
Legia Warsaw (Poland)	3–1	(Sweden) IFK Göteborg	1–0	2–1
Casino Salzburg (Austria)	0–1	(Romania) Steaua București	0–0	0–1
Dynamo Kyiv (Ukraine)	4–1	(Denmark) AaB	1–0	3–1
Rosenborg (Norway)	4–3	(Turkey) Beşiktaş	3–0	1–3
Anderlecht (Belgium)	1–2	(Hungary) Ferencváros	0–1	1–1
Panathinaikos (Greece)	1–1 (a)	(Croatia) Hajduk Split	0–0	1–1

== Group stage ==
Location of teams of the 1995–96 UEFA Champions League group stage.
Brown: Group A; Red: Group B; Orange: Group C; Yellow: Group D.

11 teams of 16 made their debut in the UEFA Champions League group stage: AaB, Blackburn Rovers, Borussia Dortmund, Ferencváros, Grasshopper, Juventus, Legia Warsaw, Nantes, Panathinaikos, Real Madrid and Rosenborg. Panathinaikos had already played in the group stage of the 1991–92 European Cup. AaB, Ferencvaros, Grasshopper, Legia and Rosenborg were the first teams to play in group stage from Denmark, Hungary, Switzerland, Poland and Norway respectively.

=== Group A ===
Pos	Team	Pld	W	D	L	GF	GA	GD	Pts	Qualification	PAN	NAN	POR	AAB
1	(Greece) Panathinaikos	6	3	2	1	7	3	+4	11	Advance to knockout stage	—	3–1	0–0	2–0
2	(France) Nantes	6	2	3	1	8	6	+2	9	Advance to knockout stage	0–0	—	0–0	3–1
3	(Portugal) Porto	6	1	4	1	6	5	+1	7		0–1	2–2	—	2–0
4	(Denmark) AaB (Note: After matchday 1 in the group, AaB replaced Dynamo Kyiv, who were banned following a failed attempt to bribe a referee.)	6	1	1	4	5	12	−7	4		2–1	0–2	2–2	—

Source: UEFA

=== Group B ===
Pos	Team	Pld	W	D	L	GF	GA	GD	Pts	Qualification	SPM	LEG	ROS	BLA
1	(Russia) Spartak Moscow	6	6	0	0	15	4	+11	18	Advance to knockout stage	—	2–1	4–1	3–0
2	(Poland) Legia Warsaw	6	2	1	3	5	8	−3	7	Advance to knockout stage	0–1	—	3–1	1–0
3	(Norway) Rosenborg	6	2	0	4	11	16	−5	6		2–4	4–0	—	2–1
4	(England) Blackburn Rovers	6	1	1	4	5	8	−3	4		0–1	0–0	4–1	—

Source: UEFA

=== Group C ===
Pos	Team	Pld	W	D	L	GF	GA	GD	Pts	Qualification	JUV	DOR	STE	RAN
1	(Italy) Juventus	6	4	1	1	15	4	+11	13	Advance to knockout stage	—	1–2	3–0	4–1
2	(Germany) Borussia Dortmund	6	2	3	1	8	8	0	9	Advance to knockout stage	1–3	—	1–0	2–2
3	(Romania) Steaua București	6	1	3	2	2	5	−3	6		0–0	0–0	—	1–0
4	(Scotland) Rangers	6	0	3	3	6	14	−8	3		0–4	2–2	1–1	—

Source: UEFA

=== Group D ===
Pos	Team	Pld	W	D	L	GF	GA	GD	Pts	Qualification	AJX	RMA	FER	GRA
1	(Netherlands) Ajax	6	5	1	0	15	1	+14	16	Advance to knockout stage	—	1–0	4–0	3–0
2	(Spain) Real Madrid	6	3	1	2	11	5	+6	10	Advance to knockout stage	0–2	—	6–1	2–0
3	(Hungary) Ferencváros	6	1	2	3	9	19	−10	5		1–5	1–1	—	3–3
4	(Switzerland) Grasshopper	6	0	2	4	3	13	−10	2		0–0	0–2	0–3	—

Source: UEFA

== Knockout stage ==
=== Bracket ===
Quarter-finals
(Germany) Borussia Dortmund	0	0	0
(Netherlands) Ajax	2	1	3
(Poland) Legia Warsaw	0	0	0
(Greece) Panathinaikos	0	3	3
(Spain) Real Madrid	1	0	1
(Italy) Juventus	0	2	2
(France) Nantes	2	2	4
(Russia) Spartak Moscow	0	2	2

Semi-finals
(Netherlands) Ajax	0	3	3
(Greece) Panathinaikos	1	0	1
(Italy) Juventus	2	2	4
(France) Nantes	0	3	3

Final
22 May – Rome
(Netherlands) Ajax	1 (2)
(Italy) Juventus (p)	1 (4)

=== Quarter-finals ===
Team 1	Agg.	Team 2	1st leg	2nd leg
Real Madrid (Spain)	1–2	(Italy) Juventus	1–0	0–2
Nantes (France)	4–2	(Russia) Spartak Moscow	2–0	2–2
Borussia Dortmund (Germany)	0–3	(Netherlands) Ajax	0–2	0–1
Legia Warsaw (Poland)	0–3	(Greece) Panathinaikos	0–0	0–3

=== Semi-finals ===
Team 1	Agg.	Team 2	1st leg	2nd leg
Juventus (Italy)	4–3	(France) Nantes	2–0	2–3
Ajax (Netherlands)	3–1	(Greece) Panathinaikos	0–1	3–0

=== Final ===
The final was played on 22 May 1996 at the Stadio Olimpico in Rome, Italy.

22 May 1996
20:30 UTC+2

Ajax (Netherlands)	1–1 (a.e.t.)	(Italy) Juventus
Litmanen 41'	Report	Ravanelli 12'
Penalties
Davids (penalty missed); Litmanen (penalty scored); Scholten (penalty scored); Silooy (penalty missed)	2–4	(penalty scored) Ferrara; (penalty scored) Pessotto; (penalty scored) Padovano; (penalty scored) Jugović

Stadio Olimpico, Rome
Attendance: 70,000
Referee: Manuel Díaz Vega (Spain)

== Top goalscorers ==
Rank	Name	Team	Goals
1	(Finland) Jari Litmanen	(Netherlands) Ajax	9
2	(Italy) Alessandro Del Piero	(Italy) Juventus	6
2	(Spain) Raúl	(Spain) Real Madrid	6
2	(Poland) Krzysztof Warzycha	(Greece) Panathinaikos	6
5	(Netherlands) Patrick Kluivert	(Netherlands) Ajax	5
5	(Russia) Yuriy Nikiforov	(Russia) Spartak Moscow	5
5	(France) Nicolas Ouédec	(France) Nantes	5
5	(Italy) Fabrizio Ravanelli	(Italy) Juventus	5
9	(England) Mike Newell	(England) Blackburn Rovers	4
9	(Chile) Iván Zamorano	(Spain) Real Madrid	4
11	(Denmark) Erik Bo Andersen	(Denmark) AaB	3
11	(Norway) Karl Petter Løken	(Norway) Rosenborg	3
11	(France) Reynald Pedros	(France) Nantes	3
11	(Russia) Sergei Yuran	(Russia) Spartak Moscow	3
11	(Chad) Japhet N'Doram	(France) Nantes	3

== See also ==
- 1995–96 UEFA Cup Winners' Cup
- 1995–96 UEFA Cup
- 1995 UEFA Intertoto Cup
