= Flórián Albert (disambiguation) =

Flórián Albert (1941–2011) was a Hungarian footballer.

Flórián Albert may also refer to:

- Flórián Albert Jr. (born 1967), Hungarian footballer, son of Flórián Albert
- Stadion Albert Flórián, former Hungarian football stadium
