= 1995–96 UEFA Champions League knockout stage =

International football competition

The knockout stage of the 1995–96 UEFA Champions League began on 6 March 1996 and ended with the final at the Stadio Olimpico in Rome on 22 May 1996. The top two teams from each of the four groups in the group stage competed in the knockout stage. The quarter-finals were predetermined with pairings being Group A vs Group B and Group C vs. Group D. A group winner played the runners-up from the other group, with the group winner host the second leg. For the semi-final, the fixtures were also predetermined, with the ties containing the group winners of A and D playing each other, as well as those of groups B and C. The order of matches from the semifinals onward was decided by a draw.

== Qualified teams ==
The knockout stage involved the eight teams which qualified as winners and runners-up of all four groups in the group stage.

Group	Winners (seeded in quarter-final draw)	Runners-up (unseeded in quarter-final draw)
A	(Greece) Panathinaikos	(France) Nantes
B	(Russia) Spartak Moscow	(Poland) Legia Warsaw
C	(Italy) Juventus	(Germany) Borussia Dortmund
D	(Netherlands) Ajax	(Spain) Real Madrid

== Format ==
Each quarter-final and semi-final was played over two legs, with each team playing one leg at home; the team that scored the most goals over the two legs qualified for the following round. In the event that the two teams scored the same number of goals over the two legs, the team that scored more goals away from home qualified for the next round; if both teams scored the same number of away goals, matches would go to extra time and then penalties if the teams could not be separated after extra time.

== Bracket ==
Quarter-finals
(Germany) Borussia Dortmund	0	0	0
(Netherlands) Ajax	2	1	3
(Poland) Legia Warsaw	0	0	0
(Greece) Panathinaikos	0	3	3
(Spain) Real Madrid	1	0	1
(Italy) Juventus	0	2	2
(France) Nantes	2	2	4
(Russia) Spartak Moscow	0	2	2

Semi-finals
(Netherlands) Ajax	0	3	3
(Greece) Panathinaikos	1	0	1
(Italy) Juventus	2	2	4
(France) Nantes	0	3	3

Final
22 May – Rome
(Netherlands) Ajax	1 (2)
(Italy) Juventus (p)	1 (4)

== Quarter-finals ==
=== Summary ===
Team 1	Agg.	Team 2	1st leg	2nd leg
Real Madrid (Spain)	1–2	(Italy) Juventus	1–0	0–2
Nantes (France)	4–2	(Russia) Spartak Moscow	2–0	2–2
Borussia Dortmund (Germany)	0–3	(Netherlands) Ajax	0–2	0–1
Legia Warsaw (Poland)	0–3	(Greece) Panathinaikos	0–0	0–3

=== Matches ===
6 March 1996
20:30

Real Madrid (Spain)	1–0	(Italy) Juventus
Raúl 20'	Report

Estadio Santiago Bernabéu, Madrid
Attendance: 65,000
Referee: Kurt Röthlisberger (Switzerland)
20 March 1996
20:30

Juventus (Italy)	2–0	(Spain) Real Madrid
Del Piero 17'; Padovano 53'	Report

Stadio delle Alpi, Turin
Attendance: 62,783
Referee: Mario van der Ende (Netherlands)

Juventus won 2–1 on aggregate.

6 March 1996
20:30

Nantes (France)	2–0	(Russia) Spartak Moscow
N'Doram 28'; Ouédec 67'	Report

Stade de la Beaujoire, Nantes
Attendance: 29,523
Referee: Hellmut Krug (Germany)
20 March 1996
15:30

Spartak Moscow (Russia)	2–2	(France) Nantes
Nikiforov 32', 38'	Report	Ouédec 63', 86'

Lokomotiv Stadium, Moscow
Attendance: 17,000
Referee: Serge Muhmenthaler (Switzerland)

Nantes won 4–2 on aggregate.

6 March 1996
20:30

Borussia Dortmund (Germany)	0–2	(Netherlands) Ajax
	Report	Davids 8'; Kluivert 85'

Westfalenstadion, Dortmund
Attendance: 34,937
Referee: Dermot Gallagher (England)
20 March 1996
20:30

Ajax (Netherlands)	1–0	(Germany) Borussia Dortmund
Musampa 75'	Report

Olympisch Stadion, Amsterdam
Attendance: 39,300
Referee: Václav Krondl (Czech Republic)

Ajax won 3–0 on aggregate.

6 March 1996
20:30

Legia Warsaw (Poland)	0–0	(Greece) Panathinaikos
	Report

Polish Army Stadium, Warsaw
Attendance: 12,000
Referee: Manuel Díaz Vega (Spain)
20 March 1996
19:30

Panathinaikos (Greece)	3–0	(Poland) Legia Warsaw
Warzycha 33', 57'; Borrelli 71'	Report

O.A.K.A., Athens
Attendance: 70,039
Referee: Sergei Khusainov (Russia)

Panathinaikos won 3–0 on aggregate.

== Semi-finals ==
=== Summary ===
Team 1	Agg.	Team 2	1st leg	2nd leg
Juventus (Italy)	4–3	(France) Nantes	2–0	2–3
Ajax (Netherlands)	3–1	(Greece) Panathinaikos	0–1	3–0

=== Matches ===
3 April 1996
20:30

Juventus (Italy)	2–0	(France) Nantes
Vialli 49'; Jugović 66'	Report

Stadio delle Alpi, Turin
Attendance: 50,425
Referee: Dermot Gallagher (England)
17 April 1996
20:30

Nantes (France)	3–2	(Italy) Juventus
Capron 44'; N'Doram 69'; Renou 82'	Report	Vialli 17'; Sousa 50'

Stade de la Beaujoire, Nantes
Attendance: 39,150
Referee: Sándor Puhl (Hungary)

Juventus won 4–3 on aggregate.

3 April 1996
20:30

Ajax (Netherlands)	0–1	(Greece) Panathinaikos
	Report	Warzycha 87'

Olympisch Stadion, Amsterdam
Attendance: 30,507
Referee: László Vágner (Hungary)
17 April 1996
19:30

Panathinaikos (Greece)	0–3	(Netherlands) Ajax
	Report	Litmanen 4', 77'; Wooter 86'

O.A.K.A., Athens
Attendance: 73,529
Referee: José María García-Aranda (Spain)

Ajax won 3–1 on aggregate.

== Final ==
The final was played on 22 May 1996 at the Stadio Olimpico in Rome, Italy.

22 May 1996
20:30

Ajax (Netherlands)	1–1 (a.e.t.)	(Italy) Juventus
Litmanen 41'	Report	Ravanelli 12'
Penalties
Davids (penalty missed); Litmanen (penalty scored); Scholten (penalty scored); Silooy (penalty missed)	2–4	(penalty scored) Ferrara; (penalty scored) Pessotto; (penalty scored) Padovano; (penalty scored) Jugović

Stadio Olimpico, Rome
Attendance: 70,000
Referee: Manuel Díaz Vega (Spain)
