= 1995–96 UEFA Champions League group stage =

International football competition

The group stage of the 1995–96 UEFA Champions League began on 13 September 1995 and ended on 6 December 1995. Eight teams qualified automatically for the group stage, while eight more qualified via a preliminary round. The 16 teams were divided into four groups of four, and the teams in each group played against each other on a home-and-away basis, meaning that each team played a total of six group matches. For each win, teams were awarded three points (the first time this was in place), with one point awarded for each draw. At the end of the group stage, the two teams in each group with the most points advanced to the quarter-finals.

== Groups ==
=== Group A ===
| Pos | Team | Pld | W | D | L | GF | GA | GD | Pts | Qualification | PAN | NAN | POR | AAB |
|---|---|---|---|---|---|---|---|---|---|---|---|---|---|---|
| 1 | (Greece) Panathinaikos | 6 | 3 | 2 | 1 | 7 | 3 | +4 | 11 | Advance to knockout stage | — | 3–1 | 0–0 | 2–0 |
| 2 | (France) Nantes | 6 | 2 | 3 | 1 | 8 | 6 | +2 | 9 | Advance to knockout stage | 0–0 | — | 0–0 | 3–1 |
| 3 | (Portugal) Porto | 6 | 1 | 4 | 1 | 6 | 5 | +1 | 7 | | 0–1 | 2–2 | — | 2–0 |
| 4 | (Denmark) AaB (Note: After matchday 1 in the group, AaB replaced Dynamo Kyiv, who were banned following a failed attempt to bribe a referee.) | 6 | 1 | 1 | 4 | 5 | 12 | −7 | 4 | | 2–1 | 0–2 | 2–2 | — |

Source: UEFA
Notes:
13 September 1995
20:30

| Nantes (France) | 0–0 | (Portugal) Porto |
|---|---|---|
| | Report |

Stade de la Beaujoire, Nantes
Attendance: 16,873
Referee: Hans-Jürgen Weber (Germany)
13 September 1995
20:30 (21:30 UTC+3)

| Dynamo Kyiv (Ukraine) | Annulled (Note: Dynamo Kyiv initially beat Panathinaikos 1–0 on matchday 1. This result was annulled when Dynamo Kyiv were expelled from the competition and AaB were allowed to play a replacement fixture.) (1–0) | (Greece) Panathinaikos |
|---|---|---|
| Kosovskyi 61' | Report |

Republican Stadium, Kyiv
Attendance: 98,000
Referee: Antonio López Nieto (Spain)

27 September 1995
19:30

| Panathinaikos (Greece) | 3–1 | (France) Nantes |
|---|---|---|
| G. C. Georgiadis 17'; Warzycha 30', 46' | Report | N'Doram 88' |

O.A.K.A., Athens
Attendance: 58,656
Referee: Vadzim Zhuk (Belarus)
27 September 1995
21:30

| Porto (Portugal) | 2–0 | (Denmark) AaB |
|---|---|---|
| Rui Barros 41', 62' | Report |

Estádio das Antas, Porto
Attendance: 10,170
Referee: Leslie Mottram (Scotland)

18 October 1995
20:30

| Nantes (France) | 3–1 | (Denmark) AaB |
|---|---|---|
| Ouédec 5'; Pedros 55'; Kosecki 75' | Report | E. Andersen 46' |

Stade de la Beaujoire, Nantes
Attendance: 29,603
Referee: László Vágner (Hungary)
18 October 1995
21:30

| Porto (Portugal) | 0–1 | (Greece) Panathinaikos |
|---|---|---|
| | Report | Markos 41' |

Estádio das Antas, Porto
Attendance: 17,920
Referee: Alfredo Trentalange (Italy)

25 October 1995
20:30

| AaB (Denmark) | 2–1 | (Greece) Panathinaikos |
|---|---|---|
| E. Andersen 7'; Madsen 90' | Report | Warzycha 41' |

Aalborg Stadion, Aalborg
Attendance: 6,100
Referee: Hellmut Krug (Germany)

1 November 1995
20:30

| AaB (Denmark) | 0–2 | (France) Nantes |
|---|---|---|
| | Report | Guyot 10'; Ouédec 68' |

Aalborg Stadion, Aalborg
Attendance: 6,800
Referee: David Elleray (England)
1 November 1995
19:30

| Panathinaikos (Greece) | 0–0 | (Portugal) Porto |
|---|---|---|
| | Report |

O.A.K.A., Athens
Attendance: 59,336
Referee: Guy Goethals (Belgium)

22 November 1995
21:30

| Porto (Portugal) | 2–2 | (France) Nantes |
|---|---|---|
| Drulović 10'; Zé Carlos 56' | Report | Pedros 3', 34' |

Estádio das Antas, Porto
Attendance: 14,867
Referee: Jaap Uilenberg (Netherlands)
22 November 1995
19:30

| Panathinaikos (Greece) | 2–0 | (Denmark) AaB |
|---|---|---|
| Alexoudis 1'; G. S. Georgiadis 39' | Report |

O.A.K.A., Athens
Attendance: 32,532
Referee: Václav Krondl (Czech Republic)

6 December 1995
20:30

| Nantes (France) | 0–0 | (Greece) Panathinaikos |
|---|---|---|
| | Report |

Stade de la Beaujoire, Nantes
Attendance: 30,000
Referee: Leif Sundell (Sweden)
6 December 1995
20:30

| AaB (Denmark) | 2–2 | (Portugal) Porto |
|---|---|---|
| E. Andersen 11'; Madsen 69' | Report | Emerson 62', 75' |

Aalborg Stadion, Aalborg
Attendance: 3,950
Referee: Ion Crăciunescu (Romania)

=== Group B ===
| Pos | Team | Pld | W | D | L | GF | GA | GD | Pts | Qualification | SPM | LEG | ROS | BLA |
|---|---|---|---|---|---|---|---|---|---|---|---|---|---|---|
| 1 | (Russia) Spartak Moscow | 6 | 6 | 0 | 0 | 15 | 4 | +11 | 18 | Advance to knockout stage | — | 2–1 | 4–1 | 3–0 |
| 2 | (Poland) Legia Warsaw | 6 | 2 | 1 | 3 | 5 | 8 | −3 | 7 | Advance to knockout stage | 0–1 | — | 3–1 | 1–0 |
| 3 | (Norway) Rosenborg | 6 | 2 | 0 | 4 | 11 | 16 | −5 | 6 | | 2–4 | 4–0 | — | 2–1 |
| 4 | (England) Blackburn Rovers | 6 | 1 | 1 | 4 | 5 | 8 | −3 | 4 | | 0–1 | 0–0 | 4–1 | — |

Source: UEFA
13 September 1995
20:30

| Legia Warsaw (Poland) | 3–1 | (Norway) Rosenborg |
|---|---|---|
| Pisz 65', 74'; Staniek 69' | Report | Jakobsen 64' (pen.) |

Polish Army Stadium, Warsaw
Attendance: 8,184
Referee: Adrian Porumboiu (Romania)
13 September 1995
19:30

| Blackburn Rovers (England) | 0–1 | (Russia) Spartak Moscow |
|---|---|---|
| | Report | Yuran 41' |

Ewood Park, Blackburn
Attendance: 20,940
Referee: Michel Piraux (Belgium)

27 September 1995
16:30

| Spartak Moscow (Russia) | 2–1 | (Poland) Legia Warsaw |
|---|---|---|
| Nikiforov 13' (pen.); Yuran 52' | Report | Jóźwiak 82' |

Luzhniki Stadium, Moscow
Attendance: 18,000
Referee: László Vágner (Hungary)
27 September 1995
20:30

| Rosenborg (Norway) | 2–1 | (England) Blackburn Rovers |
|---|---|---|
| Løken 29'; Stensaas 86' | Report | Newell 62' |

Lerkendal Stadion, Trondheim
Attendance: 12,210
Referee: Günter Benkö (Austria)

18 October 1995
20:30

| Legia Warsaw (Poland) | 1–0 | (England) Blackburn Rovers |
|---|---|---|
| Podbrożny 26' | Report |

Polish Army Stadium, Warsaw
Attendance: 15,000
Referee: Anders Frisk (Sweden)
18 October 1995
20:30

| Rosenborg (Norway) | 2–4 | (Russia) Spartak Moscow |
|---|---|---|
| Løken 2'; Brattbakk 44' | Report | Alenichev 58'; Nikiforov 67'; Kechinov 76', 83' |

Lerkendal Stadion, Trondheim
Attendance: 12,216
Referee: José María García-Aranda (Spain)

1 November 1995
19:30

| Blackburn Rovers (England) | 0–0 | (Poland) Legia Warsaw |
|---|---|---|
| | Report |

Ewood Park, Blackburn
Attendance: 20,897
Referee: Urs Meier (Switzerland)
1 November 1995
16:30

| Spartak Moscow (Russia) | 4–1 | (Norway) Rosenborg |
|---|---|---|
| Shmarov 2'; Yuran 9'; Tsymbalar 19'; Tikhonov 80' | Report | Løken 90' |

Luzhniki Stadium, Moscow
Attendance: 42,500
Referee: Václav Krondl (Czech Republic)

22 November 1995
20:30

| Rosenborg (Norway) | 4–0 | (Poland) Legia Warsaw |
|---|---|---|
| Strand 17'; Brattbakk 44'; Jakobsen 63'; Heggem 88' | Report |

Lerkendal Stadion, Trondheim
Attendance: 11,480
Referee: Hans-Jürgen Weber (Germany)
22 November 1995
20:30

| Spartak Moscow (Russia) | 3–0 | (England) Blackburn Rovers |
|---|---|---|
| Alenichev 23'; Nikiforov 47'; Mamedov 54' | Report |

Luzhniki Stadium, Moscow
Attendance: 25,000
Referee: Pierluigi Pairetto (Italy)

6 December 1995
20:30

| Legia Warsaw (Poland) | 0–1 | (Russia) Spartak Moscow |
|---|---|---|
| | Report | Mamedov 41' |

Polish Army Stadium, Warsaw
Attendance: 5,972
Referee: Leslie Mottram (Scotland)
6 December 1995
19:30

| Blackburn Rovers (England) | 4–1 | (Norway) Rosenborg |
|---|---|---|
| Shearer 16' (pen.); Newell 31', 37', 40' | Report | Iversen 30' |

Ewood Park, Blackburn
Attendance: 20,677
Referee: Didier Pauchard (France)

=== Group C ===
| Pos | Team | Pld | W | D | L | GF | GA | GD | Pts | Qualification | JUV | DOR | STE | RAN |
|---|---|---|---|---|---|---|---|---|---|---|---|---|---|---|
| 1 | (Italy) Juventus | 6 | 4 | 1 | 1 | 15 | 4 | +11 | 13 | Advance to knockout stage | — | 1–2 | 3–0 | 4–1 |
| 2 | (Germany) Borussia Dortmund | 6 | 2 | 3 | 1 | 8 | 8 | 0 | 9 | Advance to knockout stage | 1–3 | — | 1–0 | 2–2 |
| 3 | (Romania) Steaua București | 6 | 1 | 3 | 2 | 2 | 5 | −3 | 6 | | 0–0 | 0–0 | — | 1–0 |
| 4 | (Scotland) Rangers | 6 | 0 | 3 | 3 | 6 | 14 | −8 | 3 | | 0–4 | 2–2 | 1–1 | — |

Source: UEFA
13 September 1995
21:30

| Steaua București (Romania) | 1–0 | (Scotland) Rangers |
|---|---|---|
| Prodan 85' | Report |

Stadionul Steaua, Bucharest
Attendance: 18,420
Referee: Alain Sars (France)
13 September 1995
20:30

| Borussia Dortmund (Germany) | 1–3 | (Italy) Juventus |
|---|---|---|
| Möller 1' | Report | Padovano 11'; Del Piero 36'; Conte 68' |

Westfalenstadion, Dortmund
Attendance: 35,800
Referee: Kurt Röthlisberger (Switzerland)

27 September 1995
20:30

| Juventus (Italy) | 3–0 | (Romania) Steaua București |
|---|---|---|
| Di Livio 34'; Del Piero 39'; Ravanelli 48' | Report |

Stadio delle Alpi, Turin
Attendance: 34,501
Referee: Dermot Gallagher (England)
27 September 1995
19:30

| Rangers (Scotland) | 2–2 | (Germany) Borussia Dortmund |
|---|---|---|
| Gough 63'; Ferguson 73' | Report | Herrlich 19'; Kree 70' |

Ibrox Park, Glasgow
Attendance: 33,209
Referee: Jaap Uilenberg (Netherlands)

18 October 1995
20:30

| Borussia Dortmund (Germany) | 1–0 | (Romania) Steaua București |
|---|---|---|
| Ricken 58' | Report |

Westfalenstadion, Dortmund
Attendance: 35,800
Referee: Peter Mikkelsen (Denmark)
18 October 1995
20:30

| Juventus (Italy) | 4–1 | (Scotland) Rangers |
|---|---|---|
| Ravanelli 15', 76'; Conte 17'; Del Piero 23' | Report | Gough 79' |

Stadio delle Alpi, Turin
Attendance: 49,625
Referee: Vadzim Zhuk (Belarus)

1 November 1995
19:30

| Steaua București (Romania) | 0–0 | (Germany) Borussia Dortmund |
|---|---|---|
| | Report |

Stadionul Steaua, Bucharest
Attendance: 10,253
Referee: Michel Piraux (Belgium)
1 November 1995
21:30

| Rangers (Scotland) | 0–4 | (Italy) Juventus |
|---|---|---|
| | Report | Del Piero 11'; Torricelli 65'; Ravanelli 88'; Marocchi 90' |

Ibrox Park, Glasgow
Attendance: 42,523
Referee: Ahmet Çakar (Turkey)

22 November 1995
21:30

| Rangers (Scotland) | 1–1 | (Romania) Steaua București |
|---|---|---|
| Gascoigne 33' | Report | A. Ilie 55' |

Ibrox Park, Glasgow
Attendance: 30,882
Referee: Nikolai Levnikov (Russia)
22 November 1995
20:30

| Juventus (Italy) | 1–2 | (Germany) Borussia Dortmund |
|---|---|---|
| Del Piero 90' | Report | Zorc 30'; Ricken 65' |

Stadio delle Alpi, Turin
Attendance: 25,621
Referee: Anders Frisk (Sweden)

6 December 1995
19:30

| Steaua București (Romania) | 0–0 | (Italy) Juventus |
|---|---|---|
| | Report |

Stadionul Steaua, Bucharest
Attendance: 2,700
Referee: Gerd Grabher (Austria)
6 December 1995
20:30

| Borussia Dortmund (Germany) | 2–2 | (Scotland) Rangers |
|---|---|---|
| Möller 17'; Riedle 49' | Report | Laudrup 11'; Durie 85' |

Westfalenstadion, Dortmund
Attendance: 35,800
Referee: Manuel Díaz Vega (Spain)

=== Group D ===
| Pos | Team | Pld | W | D | L | GF | GA | GD | Pts | Qualification | AJX | RMA | FER | GRA |
|---|---|---|---|---|---|---|---|---|---|---|---|---|---|---|
| 1 | (Netherlands) Ajax | 6 | 5 | 1 | 0 | 15 | 1 | +14 | 16 | Advance to knockout stage | — | 1–0 | 4–0 | 3–0 |
| 2 | (Spain) Real Madrid | 6 | 3 | 1 | 2 | 11 | 5 | +6 | 10 | Advance to knockout stage | 0–2 | — | 6–1 | 2–0 |
| 3 | (Hungary) Ferencváros | 6 | 1 | 2 | 3 | 9 | 19 | −10 | 5 | | 1–5 | 1–1 | — | 3–3 |
| 4 | (Switzerland) Grasshopper | 6 | 0 | 2 | 4 | 3 | 13 | −10 | 2 | | 0–0 | 0–2 | 0–3 | — |

Source: UEFA
13 September 1995
20:30

| Grasshopper (Switzerland) | 0–3 | (Hungary) Ferencváros |
|---|---|---|
| | Report | Lisztes 61'; O. Vincze 81', 90' |

Hardturm, Zurich
Attendance: 15,530
Referee: Rune Pedersen (Norway)
13 September 1995
20:30

| Ajax (Netherlands) | 1–0 | (Spain) Real Madrid |
|---|---|---|
| Overmars 14' | Report |

Olympisch Stadion, Amsterdam
Attendance: 38,000
Referee: Piero Ceccarini (Italy)

27 September 1995
20:30

| Ferencváros (Hungary) | 1–5 | (Netherlands) Ajax |
|---|---|---|
| Nyilas 59' (pen.) | Report | Litmanen 57', 80' (pen.), 87'; Kluivert 67'; F. de Boer 85' |

Üllői úti Stadion, Budapest
Attendance: 17,743
Referee: Vassilios Nikakis (Greece)
27 September 1995
20:30

| Real Madrid (Spain) | 2–0 | (Switzerland) Grasshopper |
|---|---|---|
| Zamorano 69', 88' | Report |

Estadio Santiago Bernabéu, Madrid
Attendance: 62,000
Referee: Zbigniew Przesmycki (Poland)

18 October 1995
20:30

| Real Madrid (Spain) | 6–1 | (Hungary) Ferencváros |
|---|---|---|
| Raúl 23', 24', 84'; Zamorano 33', 47'; Hierro 54' | Report | Kopunović 64' |

Estadio Santiago Bernabéu, Madrid
Attendance: 55,000
Referee: Atanas Uzunov (Bulgaria)
18 October 1995
20:30

| Ajax (Netherlands) | 3–0 | (Switzerland) Grasshopper |
|---|---|---|
| Kluivert 12', 68'; George 87' | Report |

Olympisch Stadion, Amsterdam
Attendance: 41,000
Referee: Adrian Porumboiu (Romania)

1 November 1995
20:30

| Ferencváros (Hungary) | 1–1 | (Spain) Real Madrid |
|---|---|---|
| Albert 36' | Report | Raúl 74' |

Üllői úti Stadion, Budapest
Attendance: 17,117
Referee: Paul Durkin (England)
1 November 1995
20:30

| Grasshopper (Switzerland) | 0–0 | (Netherlands) Ajax |
|---|---|---|
| | Report |

Hardturm, Zurich
Attendance: 20,100
Referee: Nikolai Levnikov (Russia)

22 November 1995
20:30

| Ferencváros (Hungary) | 3–3 | (Switzerland) Grasshopper |
|---|---|---|
| Albert 20'; Lisztes 24'; Nyilas 85' (pen.) | Report | Subiat 21'; Comisetti 47'; Ibrahim 64' |

Üllői úti Stadion, Budapest
Attendance: 14,864
Referee: Kim Milton Nielsen (Denmark)
22 November 1995
20:30

| Real Madrid (Spain) | 0–2 | (Netherlands) Ajax |
|---|---|---|
| | Report | Litmanen 64'; Kluivert 76' |

Estadio Santiago Bernabéu, Madrid
Attendance: 72,000
Referee: Hellmut Krug (Germany)

6 December 1995
20:30

| Ajax (Netherlands) | 4–0 | (Hungary) Ferencváros |
|---|---|---|
| Overmars 17'; R. de Boer 22'; Litmanen 62', 66' | Report |

Olympisch Stadion, Amsterdam
Attendance: 42,319
Referee: Ilkka Koho (Finland)
6 December 1995
20:30

| Grasshopper (Switzerland) | 0–2 | (Spain) Real Madrid |
|---|---|---|
| | Report | Raúl 56'; Míchel 67' |

Hardturm, Zurich
Attendance: 20,100
Referee: Jim McCluskey (Scotland)
