= Dennis Schulp =

Dutch footballer (born 1978)

Personal information
- Date of birth: 18 January 1978 (age 48)
- Place of birth: Amsterdam, Netherlands
- Height: 1.76 m (5 ft 9 in)
- Position: Striker

Senior career*
Years	Team	Apps	(Gls)
1996–1997	Ajax	5	(1)
1997–1998	FC Volendam	26	(4)
1998–2000	Willem II	43	(10)
2001	NEC Nijmegen	20	(3)
2001–2003	De Graafschap	50	(9)
2004	Helmond Sport	13	(5)
2004–2005	FC Den Bosch	22	(3)
2005–2007	SC Paderborn	44	(3)
2008	Wuppertaler SV	14	(0)
2008	Wuppertaler SV II	10	(2)
2009–2010	DOVO		

International career
1998	Netherlands U21	2	(0)
- * Club domestic league appearances and goals

Dennis Schulp (born 18 January 1978) is a Dutch former professional footballer who played as a striker.

== Career ==
Born in Amsterdam, North Holland, Schulp made his professional debut for Ajax on 27 March 1996 replacing Patrick Kluivert after 78 minutes. He later played for FC Volendam, Willem II Tilburg, NEC Nijmegen, De Graafschap, Helmond Sport, FC Den Bosch and SC Paderborn 07 (Germany). Schulp joined Wuppertal in January 2008, six months after leaving SC Paderborn and left the club again on 31 December 2010.
