= Flórián Albert Jr. =

Hungarian footballer

Personal information
- Date of birth: 12 December 1967 (age 58)
- Place of birth: Budapest, Hungary
- Height: 1.87 m (6 ft 2 in)
- Position: Midfielder

Senior career*
Years	Team	Apps	(Gls)
1987–1996	Ferencváros	141	(27)
1996–1997	Maccabi Petah Tikva	19	(0)
1997–1998	Ferencváros	25	(3)
1998–1999	Red Star	6	(0)
1999–2000	BKV Előre	26	(2)
Total		217	(32)

International career
1993–1996	Hungary	6	(0)

Managerial career
- 2013–2015: Budaörs
- 2015: Soroksár
- 2021–2023: BKV Előre
- * Club domestic league appearances and goals

Flórián Albert Jr. (born 12 December 1967) is a Hungarian football coach and former player.

== Playing career ==
The son of Ballon d'Or-winning footballer Flórián Albert Sr., Albert played professional club football in Hungary, Israel, and France for Ferencváros, Maccabi Petah Tikva, Red Star and BKV Előre SC. He also earned six caps for Hungary between 1993 and 1996.

== Coaching career ==
After working at Tököl and as operational director of Puskás Akadémia, he became manager of Budaörs. After two seasons he left the club and went to Soroksár, before becoming the manager of BKV Előre, leaving the club after the 2022–23 season.
