= Fabrizio Ravanelli =

Italian football player and manager

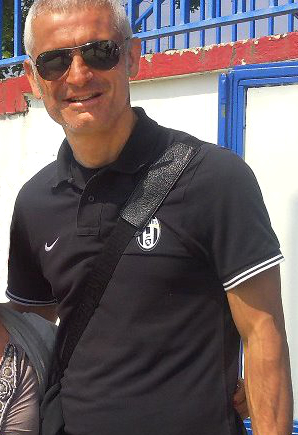
- Ravanelli in 2012

Personal information
- Date of birth: 11 December 1968 (age 57)
- Place of birth: Perugia, Italy
- Height: 1.88 m (6 ft 2 in)
- Position: Striker

Senior career*
Years	Team	Apps	(Gls)
1986–1989	Perugia	90	(41)
1989	Avellino	7	(0)
1989–1990	Casertana	27	(12)
1990–1992	Reggiana	66	(24)
1992–1996	Juventus	111	(41)
1996–1997	Middlesbrough	35	(17)
1997–1999	Marseille	64	(28)
1999–2001	Lazio	27	(4)
2001–2003	Derby County	50	(14)
2003–2004	Dundee	5	(0)
2004–2005	Perugia	39	(9)
Total		521	(190)

International career
1995–1998	Italy	22	(8)

Managerial career
- 2013: Ajaccio
- 2018: Arsenal Kyiv
- * Club domestic league appearances and goals

Fabrizio Ravanelli (Italian pronunciation: [faˈbrittsjo ravaˈnɛlli]; born 11 December 1968) is an Italian football manager and former player.

A former striker, Ravanelli started and ended his playing career at hometown club Perugia, and also played for Middlesbrough, Juventus and Marseille. He won trophies with Juventus including the Serie A in 1995 and the Champions League in 1996 where he scored in the final. In all, during his career he played with twelve clubs from four countries; his native Italy, England, France and Scotland. Nicknamed "The White Feather", he earned 22 caps for the Italy national team, scoring 8 goals, and was a member of the Italian squad that took part at UEFA Euro 1996.

== Club career ==
=== Early career in Italy ===
Ravanelli began his club career with his hometown club Perugia in 1986, where he remained until 1989. He had a spell with Avellino later that year, and subsequently played with Casertana for a season. In 1990, he moved to Reggiana, where he remained for two seasons.

=== Juventus ===
After joining Juventus in 1992, he formed a formidable offensive line alongside players such as Roberto Baggio, Gianluca Vialli, Paolo Di Canio, Pierluigi Casiraghi, Andreas Möller and Alessandro Del Piero. Affectionately known as the "White Feather" (in Italian: Penna Bianca) in recognition of his prematurely white hair (a nickname which had also previously belonged to former Juventus legend Roberto Bettega), he was one of Europe's top goalscorers in the mid-1990s. After initially struggling to obtain a starting spot under Giovanni Trapattoni, due to competition from several other strikers, he eventually managed to break into the starting line-up. During the 1994–95 season, under Marcello Lippi, he played a key role as the club claimed a domestic double, playing in an attacking trident, alongside Vialli, and either Baggio or Del Piero. With the Turin club, Ravanelli won one Serie A title (1994–95), one Coppa Italia (1994–95), one Supercoppa Italiana (1995), one Champions League (1995–96), where he scored in the final against Ajax, and one UEFA Cup (1992–93). On 27 September 1994, he memorably scored all five goals for Juventus against CSKA Sofia in a 5–1 win. In the 1996 UEFA Champions League Final, he put Juventus 1–0 up at the Stadio Olimpico in Rome. Ajax subsequently equalised, but Juventus still won the game through a penalty shootout.

=== Middlesbrough ===
Ravanelli made an immediate positive impact on moving to the Premier League with Bryan Robson's Middlesbrough on a £7 million transfer in 1996, where his success was sustained. He scored a hat-trick on his league debut against Liverpool on the opening day of the 1996–97 season. Despite being one of the league's top scorers, Middlesbrough were relegated in the year that he joined. He did, however, help them to the final of both domestic cup competitions that season. He started both finals, as Middlesbrough lost 2–0 against Chelsea in the FA Cup Final, and Leicester City 1–0 in the replay of the League Cup Final. Against Leicester, he scored the first goal in the final of the first meeting, only for Emile Heskey to equalise and send the game to a replay, which Leicester subsequently won. He alienated himself from teammates and fans, with his constant complaints and criticisms of the club's training regime and facilities, as well as the town itself, despite being the highest paid footballer in the Premiership at the time. Whilst at the club, he resided in the local small North Yorkshire village of Hutton Rudby, where Middlesbrough football associates such as Paul Merson, Gordon McQueen and several other notable individuals have had residences.

=== Marseille ===
After Middlesbrough's relegation, Ravanelli moved to Marseille. In the 1998–99 season, Marseille finished in second place in the French Division 1, one point behind Bordeaux. The following season l'OM competed in the 1999–2000 UEFA Champions League, with Ravanelli scoring once against Sturm Graz at the Stade Vélodrome.

=== Lazio ===
In December 1999, Ravanelli returned to Italy to sign for Lazio. Ravanelli won his second Scudetto as Lazio ended the 1999–2000 season as champions, also winning the Coppa Italia, and the Supercoppa Italiana.

=== Derby County ===
In July 2001, Ravanelli joined Derby County on a free transfer, signing a two-year deal, but could not save the club from relegation in 2002. Due to Derby's financial problems, they had to defer his wage payments which they paid for several years.

=== Dundee ===
He then joined Dundee, following the end of his Derby contract, but was sacked after the club released all of their top earners. The only game in which Ravanelli scored for Dundee was against Clyde in a League Cup match, when he scored a hat-trick.

=== Perugia ===
After the experience in Scotland, he returned to Italy to finish his career with his hometown club Perugia, with whom he had also started his professional career, with the aim of trying to save the club from relegation.

== International career ==
Ravanelli earned 22 caps for the Italy national team between 1995 and 1999, under managers Arrigo Sacchi, Cesare Maldini, and Dino Zoff, scoring eight goals. He made his international debut under Sacchi on 25 March 1995, in a 4–1 home victory over Estonia, in an UEFA Euro 1996 qualifying fixture in Salerno, also scoring his first international goal during the match. He was a member of the Italian squad that took part at UEFA Euro 1996, and made two appearances throughout the tournament, which came in Italy's opening two group matches, a 2–1 win over Russia, and a 2–1 loss against the Czech Republic, as Italy were eliminated in the first round. He missed out on a spot at the 1998 FIFA World Cup, however, as striker Enrico Chiesa was selected by Maldini in his place.

== Player profile ==
=== Style of play ===
Ravanelli was a left-footed striker.

A prolific goalscorer, who was good in the air, and who possessed a powerful and accurate shot, in addition to his ability to score goals, Ravanelli was also capable of playing off his teammates, due to his link-up play, which, combined with his other skills, made him a complete forward. This also enabled him to play in a supporting role, as a second striker or even as a winger, positions in which he often utilised his ability in the air to get on the end of high balls and create chances for other strikers by providing them with headed assists from knockdowns.

=== Goal celebrations ===
Ravanelli's signature goal celebration involved him pulling his shirt over his head and running around the field. He was therefore a strong opposer of the new FIFA regulation, which impeded players from removing their shirts during post goal-celebrations, and which punished any violators with a yellow card.

== Managerial career ==
=== Juventus ===
Ravanelli started his coaching career with the Juventus youth team. He joined the club's coaching staff in July 2011 and remained there until 2013.

=== Ajaccio ===
On 8 June 2013, Ravanelli signed a two-year contract as the new head coach of Ligue 1 club Ajaccio.

On 2 November 2013, he was sacked from his post after his club had suffered its fifth consecutive Ligue 1 defeat (this time losing 3–1 at home against Valenciennes) on the same day that left them in 19th (second from bottom) position (one win, four draws and seven defeats in 12 Ligue 1 matches) in the Ligue 1 standings. "It is not an easy decision (to sack Ravanelli) for a number of reasons. I really appreciated Fabrizio Ravanelli, I really wanted it to work. I do not remember seeing a staff work that much, from morning till night without stopping. You know what football is like. If things are not going well, the only solution is to change the staff," said Alain Orsoni, the president of Ajaccio.

=== Arsenal Kyiv ===
On 22 June 2018, Ravanelli signed contract with Ukrainian Premier League club Arsenal Kyiv. On 22 September 2018, Ravanelli resigned after the string of unsuccessful results.

== Media career ==
Following his retirement, Ravanelli also worked as a football pundit for Sky Italia, Fox Sports and Mediaset.

== Personal life ==
It has been mistakenly reported in some sources that Luca Ravanelli, a defender, is Fabrizio's son. According to Luca, he is not.

== Career statistics ==
=== Club ===
Appearances and goals by club, season and competition
Club	Season	League			National cup		League cup		Continental		Other		Total	
Club	Season	Division	Apps	Goals	Apps	Goals	Apps	Goals	Apps	Goals	Apps	Goals	Apps	Goals
Perugia	1986–87	Serie C2	26	5			–		–		–		26	5
Perugia	1987–88	Serie C2	32	23			–		–		–		32	23
Perugia	1988–89	Serie B	32	13			–		–		–		32	13
Perugia	Total		90	41			0	0	0	0	0	0	90	41
Avellino	1989–90	Serie B	7	0			–		–		–		7	0
Casertana	1989–90	Serie C1	27	12			–		–		–		27	12
Reggiana	1990–91	Serie B	34	16			–		–		–		34	16
Reggiana	1991–92	Serie B	32	8			–		–		–		32	8
Reggiana	Total		66	24			0	0	0	0	0	0	66	24
Juventus	1992–93	Serie A	22	5	3	1	–		8	3	–		33	9
Juventus	1993–94	Serie A	30	9	2	0	–		6	3	–		38	12
Juventus	1994–95	Serie A	33	15	9	6	0	0	11	9	–		53	30
Juventus	1995–96	Serie A	26	12	2	1	–		7	5	–		36	18
Juventus	Total		111	41	16	8	0	0	32	20	0	0	159	69
Middlesbrough	1996–97	Premier League	33	16	7	6	8	9	–		–		48	31
Middlesbrough	1997–98	First Division	2	1	0	0	0	0	–		–		2	1
Middlesbrough	Total		35	17	7	6	8	9	0	0	0	0	50	32
Marseille	1997–98	Ligue 1	21	9	1	0	3	0	–		–		25	9
Marseille	1998–99	Ligue 1	29	13	1	1	1	0	7	1	–		38	15
Marseille	1999–2000	Ligue 1	14	6	0	0	0	0	4	1	–		18	7
Marseille	Total		64	28	2	1	4	0	11	2	0	0	81	31
Lazio	1999–2000	Serie A	16	2	5	2	0	0	0	0	–		21	4
Lazio	2000–01	Serie A	11	2	4	2	0	0	6	2	–		21	6
Lazio	Total		27	4	9	4	0	0	6	2	0	0	42	10
Derby County	2001–02	Premier League	31	9	1	1	2	1	–		–		34	11
Derby County	2002–03	First Division	19	5	0	0	0	0	–		–		19	5
Derby County	Total		50	14	1	1	2	1	0	0	0	0	53	16
Dundee	2003–04	Scottish Premier League	5	0	0	0	1	3	–		–		6	3
Perugia	2003–04	Serie A	15	6	2	0	–		1	0	–		18	6
Perugia	2004–05	Serie B	24	3	0	0	0	0	–		3	0	27	3
Perugia	Total		39	9	2	0	0	0	1	0	3	0	42	9
Career total			521	190	37	20	15	13	50	24	3	0	626	247

=== International ===
Appearances and goals by national team and year
National team	Year	Apps	Goals
Italy	1995	6	4
Italy	1996	8	4
Italy	1997	5	0
Italy	1998	3	0
Total		22	8

Scores and results list Italy's goal tally first, score column indicates score after each Ravanelli goal.

List of international goals scored by Fabrizio Ravanelli
No.	Date	Venue	Opponent	Score	Result	Competition
1	25 March 1995	Stadio Arechi, Salerno, Italy	Estonia	4–1	4–1	Euro 1996 qualifier
2	6 September 1995	Stadio Friuli, Udine, Italy	Slovenia	1–0	1–0	Euro 1996 qualifier
3	11 November 1995	Stadio San Nicola, Bari, Italy	Ukraine	1–1	3–1	Euro 1996 qualifier
4	11 November 1995	Stadio San Nicola, Bari, Italy	Ukraine	2–1	3–1	Euro 1996 qualifier
5	24 January 1996	Stadio Libero Liberati, Terni, Italy	Wales	2–0	3–0	Friendly
6	5 October 1996	Stadionul Republican, Chişinău, Moldova	Moldova	1–0	3–1	1998 World Cup qualifier
7	5 October 1996	Stadionul Republican, Chişinău, Moldova	Moldova	3–1	3–1	1998 World Cup qualifier
8	9 October 1996	Stadio Renato Curi, Perugia, Italy	Georgia	1–0	1–0	1998 World Cup qualifier

=== Manager ===
As of 22 September 2018.

Team	Nat	From	To	Record							
Team	Nat	From	To	G	W	D	L	GF	GA	GD	Win %
Ajaccio	(France)	8 June 2013	2 November 2013	13	1	4	8	8	19	−11	7.69
Arsenal Kyiv	(Ukraine)	22 June 2018	22 September 2018	9	1	1	7	5	19	−14	11.11
Total				22	2	5	15	13	38	−25	9.09

== Honours ==
Juventus

- Serie A: 1994–95
- Coppa Italia: 1994–95
- Supercoppa Italiana: 1995
- UEFA Champions League: 1995–96
- UEFA Cup: 1992–93; runner-up: 1994–95

Middlesbrough

- FA Cup runner-up: 1996–97
- Football League Cup runner-up: 1996–97

Marseille

- UEFA Cup runner-up: 1998–99

Lazio

- Serie A: 1999–2000
- Coppa Italia: 1999–2000
- Supercoppa Italiana: 2000

Individual

- Coppa Italia top scorer: 1994–95 (6 goals)
- Serie C2 top scorer: 1987–88 (23 goals)
- EFL Cup top scorer: 1996–97 (9 goals)
- FA Cup top scorer: 1996–97 (6 goals)
