= Arnold Scholten =

Dutch footballer

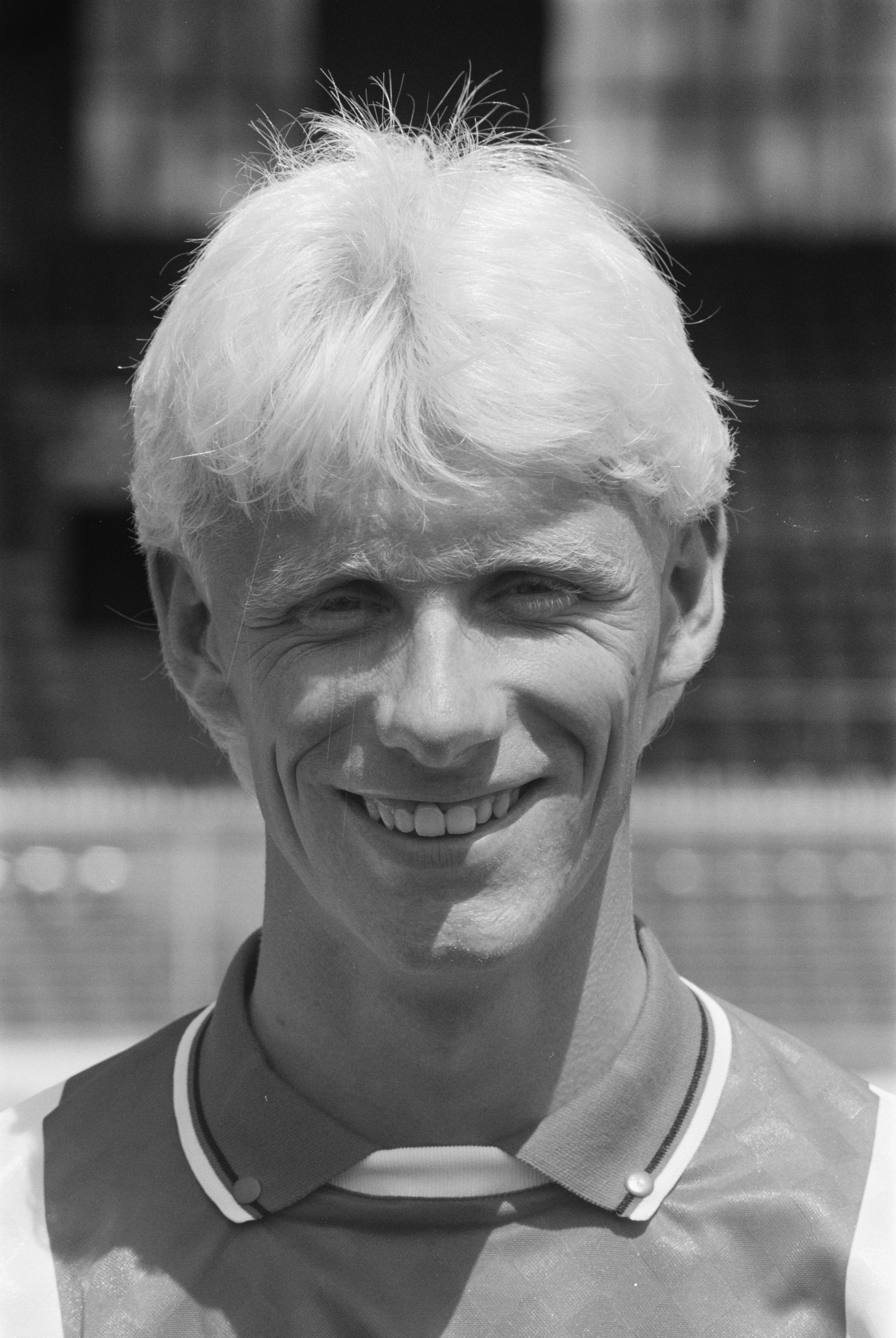
- Scholten in 1989

Personal information
- Date of birth: 5 December 1962 (age 63)
- Place of birth: Den Bosch, Netherlands
- Height: 1.86 m (6 ft 1 in)
- Position: Midfielder

Youth career
- BVV

Senior career*
Years	Team	Apps	(Gls)
1983–1986	Den Bosch	74	(10)
1986–1990	Ajax	69	(5)
1990–1995	Feyenoord	165	(20)
1995–1997	Ajax	44	(3)
1997–1998	JEF United Ichihara	48	(2)
1999–2001	Den Bosch	65	(2)
Total		465	(42)

Managerial career
- 2001–2002: Den Bosch (technical director)
- 2002–2006: RKC Waalwijk (youth coach)
- 2006–2007: Feyenoord (youth coach)
- 2009–2017: Den Bosch (youth coach)
- 2017–: Feyenoord (youth coach)
- 2019–2020: Jong Feyenoord
- * Club domestic league appearances and goals

Arnold Scholten (born 5 December 1962) is a Dutch football coach and former player who works as youth coach at Feyenoord. He played as a midfielder for Den Bosch, Ajax, Feyenoord and JEF United Ichihara (Japan). Because of his white-blonde haircolor, Scholten was nicknamed The White Socrates after Brazilian playmaker Sócrates.

== Career statistics ==
Appearances and goals by club, season and competition
Club	Season	League		
Club	Season	Division	Apps	Goals
Den Bosch	1983–84	Eredivisie	9	1
Den Bosch	1984–85	Eredivisie	31	1
Den Bosch	1985–86	Eredivisie	34	8
Den Bosch	Total		74	10
Ajax	1986–87	Eredivisie	18	1
Ajax	1987–88	Eredivisie	17	2
Ajax	1988–89	Eredivisie	28	2
Ajax	1989–90	Eredivisie	6	0
Ajax	Total		69	5
Feyenoord	1989–90	Eredivisie	16	2
Feyenoord	1990–91	Eredivisie	33	1
Feyenoord	1991–92	Eredivisie	33	1
Feyenoord	1992–93	Eredivisie	25	4
Feyenoord	1993–94	Eredivisie	30	6
Feyenoord	1994–95	Eredivisie	28	6
Feyenoord	Total		165	20
Ajax	1995–96	Eredivisie	16	1
Ajax	1996–97	Eredivisie	28	2
Ajax	Total		44	3
JEF United Ichihara	1997	J1 League	15	0
JEF United Ichihara	1998	J1 League	33	2
JEF United Ichihara	Total		48	2
Den Bosch	1998–99	Eerste Divisie	16	1
Den Bosch	1999–00	Eredivisie	21	1
Den Bosch	2000–01	Eerste Divisie	28	0
Den Bosch	Total		65	2
Career total			465	42

== Honours ==
Ajax

- Eredivisie: 1995–96
- KNVB Cup: 1986–87
- UEFA Cup Winners' Cup: 1986–87
- Johan Cruijff Schaal: 1995
- UEFA Super Cup: 1995
- Intercontinental Cup: 1995
- UEFA Champions League runner-up: 1995-96

Feyenoord

- Eredivisie: 1992–93
- KNVB Cup: 1990–91, 1991–92, 1993–94, 1994–95
- Johan Cruijff Schaal: 1991

Den Bosch

- Eerste Divisie: 1998–99, 2000–01
