= Erik Bo Andersen =

Danish footballer (born 1970)

Personal information
- Full name: Erik Bo Andersen
- Date of birth: 14 November 1970 (age 55)
- Place of birth: Dronningborg, Denmark
- Height: 1.89 m (6 ft 2 in)
- Position: Striker

Youth career
- Dronningborg Boldklub

Senior career*
| Years | Team | Apps | (Gls) |
| 1992–1996 | AaB | 98 | (50) |
| 1996–1997 | Rangers | 23 | (15) |
| 1997–1998 | OB | 16 | (6) |
| 1998–2000 | MSV Duisburg | 25 | (2) |
| 2000 | → Vejle (loan) | 14 | (7) |
| 2000–2001 | Odd Grenland | 13 | (0) |
| 2002–2003 | AaB | 11 | (0) |
| Total | | 200 | (80) |

International career
| 1995–1996 | Denmark | 6 | (0) |
- * Club domestic league appearances and goals

Erik Bo Andersen (born 14 November 1970) is a Danish former professional footballer who played six matches for the Denmark national team and represented Denmark at UEFA Euro 1996. He played in the striker position and won the 1995 Danish Superliga championship with Aalborg Boldspilklub, the Scottish Premier Division twice with Rangers F.C., and the Norwegian Cup with Odd Grenland. Andersen also played for German club MSV Duisburg, as well as Odense BK and Vejle Boldklub in Denmark.

In November 2005, Andersen was elected to represent the Danish Liberal Party in the Randers Municipality council.

== Club career ==
=== AaB ===
Born in Dronningborg near Randers, Erik Bo Andersen started his career at the local amateur team Dronningborg Boldklub. He moved to Aalborg Boldspilklub (AaB) in the top-flight Danish Superliga championship in January 1992 and made his Superliga debut in April 1992.

In his first year at AaB, Andersen spent his time in the reserve team improving his technique, before he got his national breakthrough when he scored two goals in a Danish Cup game against BK Frem in March 1993. He soon displayed his goal scoring abilities, which earned him the nickname Red Romario, alluding to Brazilian striker Romario and Andersen's red hair. In the 1994–95 Superliga season, Andersen scored two hat-tricks, and even scored four goals in a 5–0 win against AGF Aarhus. He was league topscorer with 24 goals as AaB won the 1994–95 Superliga championship, the first championship in club history. He played the first half of the 1995–96 Superliga season, scoring 13 goals in 20 games, including another two hat-tricks. In February 1996, Andersen was bought in a transfer deal worth £1.2 million by Rangers in the Scottish Premier Division.

=== Rangers ===
At Rangers, Andersen played alongside fellow Dane Brian Laudrup. During his time at Rangers, Andersen's technical shortcomings and awkward playing style earned him the nickname Bambi. His best Rangers moment was when he came on as a substitute and scored twice in the 3–1 victory over arch-rivals Celtic at Ibrox Stadium. It was the goals to make it 2–1 and 3–1, which he delivered. Rangers won the Premier Division titles in both 1995/96 and 1996/97, but he could not establish himself in the Rangers starting line-up, and was eventually not allowed to train with the first team.

When Rangers bought striker Marco Negri in the summer 1997, Andersen left the club shortly thereafter. He scored 15 goals in 23 league games for the club. A number of clubs were interested in Andersen, but the transfer fee demands of Rangers proved too high, and Andersen had to rescind the sign-on fee of £300,000 Rangers still owed him from the Aalborg BK transfer, before an offer was accepted. He later regretted having caved in to Rangers, claiming he should have played hard-ball in order to get the money owed to him, inspired by the approach of Peter Møller.

=== Plagued by injury ===
Superliga relegation battlers Odense Boldklub (OB) honoured the Rangers demand, and paid £800,000 for Andersen in October 1997. Andersen scored six goals in 16 Superliga games, but could not prevent Odense from being relegated at the end of the season. Andersen moved abroad once more, as OB sold him for DKK 9.6 million to MSV Duisburg in the German Bundesliga in July 1998, to play alongside fellow Dane Stig Tøfting. Andersen suffered an injury during the pre-season training, and had to undergo a one-and-a-half month recovery. When he recovered he was relegated to a substitute role, and Andersen never found his goal scoring form in Duisburg. Following two goals in 25 games, Andersen was loaned out to Superliga relegation battlers Vejle Boldklub from January to and including June 2000, to play under his former AaB coach Poul Erik Andreasen. Despite seven goals in 14 games from Andersen, Vejle were relegated at the end of the season. Andersen did not want to return to Duisburg, and moved to Odd Grenland in the Norwegian Premier League in July 2000.

At Odd Grenland, Andersen was seen as the replacement of Norwegian international Frode Johnsen who had just been sold, and Andersen joined former AaB teammate Christian Flindt Bjerg at the club. He was bought for DKK 2.8 million, a transfer fee record for Odd Grenland. After a few games for Odd Grenland, including winning the 2000 Norwegian Cup tournament, Andersen suffered a knee injury in fall 2000. He did not return to playing football until August 2001. After complications with the injured knee, he underwent another half year of recovery. During his injuries, Grenland did not have the medical staff to care for Andersen, and he was left to tend to the injuries himself, and was helped by his former club AaB. He eventually paid Odd Grenland to let him go in December 2001, and returned to play for AaB in January 2002. He did not become a part of the starting line-up due injuries, and when he suffered yet another knee injury in spring 2003, he decided to end his career. Andersen played a combined total of 142 games and scored 66 goals for AaB in all competitions.

== International career ==
Andersen was called up for the Denmark national team and made his international debut in an April 1995 match against Macedonia, when he replaced AaB teammate Peter Rasmussen at half time. While at Rangers, he was selected for the Danish squad at the 1996 European Championship. He played in the last third game of the group stage matches, where Denmark won 3–0 against Turkey. In this game Andersen performed very well as he provided two assists to teammate Brian Laudrup. This was his last national team game. Erik Bo Andersen played a total six national team games but did not score any goals.

While at Odense BK, Andersen was once more in the periphery of the national team for a short period of time, as he played four games for the Danish league national football team, a selection of the best Danish Superliga players in January 1998.

== Post-playing career ==
At his retirement, Andersen moved back to coach his childhood club Dronningborg Boldklub in the lower leagues of Danish football.

In the 2005 Danish municipality elections, Andersen was a candidate for the Danish Liberal Party in the Randers municipality. He received 217 personal votes, and was elected for the Randers municipality council by a margin of 13 votes.

He started the developing company EBA Invest, and invested in a real estate development project near Dronningborg. In 2004, Andersen staked all his football earnings in buying a field outside Randers, which he developed into a fully working residential area, before selling it off in 65 building plots.

== Honours ==
AaB

- Danish Superliga: 1995

Rangers

- Scottish Premier Division: 1995–96 and 1996–97
- Scottish Cup: 1995–96

Odd Grenland

- Norwegian Cup: 2000
