= Nordin Wooter =

Dutch footballer (born 1976)

Personal information
- Date of birth: 24 August 1976 (age 50)
- Place of birth: Breda, Netherlands
- Height: 1.72 m (5 ft 8 in)
- Position: Winger

Youth career
- OSV
- Zeeburgia

Senior career*
| Years | Team | Apps | (Gls) |
| 1994–1997 | Ajax | 58 | (6) |
| 1997–1999 | Zaragoza | 32 | (1) |
| 1999–2002 | Watford | 63 | (3) |
| 2002–2003 | RBC | 29 | (2) |
| 2003–2004 | Braga | 19 | (0) |
| 2004 | Anorthosis Famagusta | 14 | (7) |
| 2004–2006 | Panathinaikos | 21 | (1) |
| 2006–2007 | Sivasspor | 10 | (3) |
| 2007–2008 | AEK Larnaca | 11 | (2) |
| Total | | 257 | (25) |

International career
| | Netherlands U17 | 8 | (2) |
| | Netherlands U19 | 23 | (7) |
| | Netherlands U21 | 15 | (5) |
- * Club domestic league appearances and goals

Nordin Sibadich Wooter (born 24 August 1976) is a Dutch former professional footballer who played as a winger.

== Club career ==
Wooter was born in Breda, and started playing at OSV and AVV Zeeburgia before joining the youth academy of Ajax. He entered the Ajax first team at the time of the successes between 1994 and 1996 where he became the national champion twice and won the UEFA Champions League with the team. On 17 April 1996, he became the first teenager ever to score in a UEFA Champions League semi-final. This happened during the 1995–96 season in an away match against Panathinaikos, in which Wooter scored the third and last goal after two previous goals by Jari Litmanen.

A spell at La Liga side Real Zaragoza followed, before in 1999 Wooter joined English Premier League club Watford for a then club-record fee of £950,000. He made his debut for Watford in a memorable 1–0 win over Chelsea, and went on to score three goals for the club, against Leicester City, Norwich City and Wimbledon.

After short periods at RBC Roosendaal and Braga, he was successful in 2004 with Anorthosis Famagusta in Cyprus. He was taken over by Panathinaikos during the 2004–05 season. In the 2006–07 season he played for Sivasspor and a season later he ended his playing career with AEK Larnaca.

== International career ==
Wooter was a member of the Dutch squad at the 1995 FIFA World Youth Championship. For the Netherlands U17 he made eight appearances scoring two goals. For the Netherlands U19 he made 23 appearances scoring seven goals. For the Netherlands U21 he made 15 appearances scoring five goals.

== Post-playing career ==
From 2010 to 2012 Wooter was chairman of FC New Amsterdam, which emerged from SC Nieuwendam, which was formed in 2004 from a merger, and his organization 'Masters of the Game', where he works together with his former Ajax teammates Kiki Musampa and Tarik Oulida. He was declared bankrupt in 2011 and the club followed suit a year later. Since 2012, he has been working as a technique trainer for the youngest youth players at Ajax. In January 2019, he was appointed coach of FC Lienden.

By the end of 2014, Wooter together with David Endt managed a FIFA supported project for the Surinamese Football Association (S.V.B.) where the football school of Wooter in the Netherlands has the delegated authority from the S.V.B. to map out players of Surinamese descent and to interest them in coming out for the Suriname national team.
