= Manuel Díaz Vega =

Spanish football referee

- Born: 1 September 1954 (age 72); Salas, Spain

Domestic
Years	League	Role
1987–2000	La Liga	Referee

International
Years	League	Role
1991–1999	FIFA-listed	Referee

Manuel Díaz Vega (born 1 September 1954 in Salas, Asturias) is a Spanish retired football referee. He officiated one match in both the 1994 FIFA World Cup and UEFA Euro 1996. He also refereed the 1996 UEFA Champions League final between Juventus and Ajax at the Stadio Olimpico in Rome, which the Italian side won 4–2 on penalties following a 1–1 draw after extra time.

== Major matches refereed ==
Date	Match	Tournament	Venue	Result	Ref
22 May 1996	Ajax vs. Juventus	1996 UEFA Champions League final	Stadio Olimpico, Rome	1–1 (2–4 on penalties)	
