= 1996–97 Juventus FC season =

Italian football club season

Juventus
1996–97 season
- President: Vittorio Chiusano
- Manager: Marcello Lippi
- Stadium: Stadio delle Alpi
- Serie A: 1st
- Coppa Italia: Quarter-finals
- UEFA Champions League: Runners-up
- UEFA Super Cup: Winners
- Intercontinental Cup: Winners
- Top goalscorer: League: Alessandro Del Piero; Michele Padovano; Christian Vieri (8 each); All: Alessandro Del Piero (15)
Home colours	Away colours	Third colours

Juventus Football Club won the domestic title and reached a second consecutive Champions League final, where Karl-Heinz Riedle scored twice for Borussia Dortmund in a 3–1 defeat of Juventus.

== Overview ==
Competition	Record								Result	Top Scorer
Competition	G	W	D	L	GF	GA	GD	Win %	Result	Top Scorer
Serie A	34	17	14	3	51	24	+27	50.00	Winners	(Italy) Alessandro Del Piero, 8 (Italy) Michele Padovano, 8 (Italy) Christian Vieri, 8
Coppa Italia	5	2	2	1	5	5	+0	40.00	Quarter Finals	4 Players, 1
UEFA Champions League	11	8	2	1	21	7	+14	72.73	Runners-up	4 Players, 4
UEFA Super Cup	2	2	0	0	9	2	+7	100.00	Winners	(Italy) Alessandro Del Piero, 2 (Italy) Michele Padovano, 2
Intercontinental Cup	1	1	0	0	1	0	+1	100.00	Winners	(Italy) Alessandro Del Piero, 1
Total	53	30	18	5	87	49	+38	56.60		(Italy) Alessandro Del Piero, 15

== Players ==
=== Squad information ===
Squad at end of season

Note: Flags indicate national team as defined under FIFA eligibility rules; some limited exceptions apply. Players may hold more than one non-FIFA nationality.

No.	Pos.	Nation	Player
1	GK	ITA	Angelo Peruzzi (vice-captain)
2	DF	ITA	Ciro Ferrara
3	DF	ITA	Moreno Torricelli
4	DF	URU	Paolo Montero
5	DF	ITA	Sergio Porrini
6	DF	POR	Dimas
7	MF	ITA	Angelo Di Livio
8	MF	ITA	Antonio Conte (captain)
9	FW	CRO	Alen Bokšić
10	FW	ITA	Alessandro Del Piero
11	FW	ITA	Michele Padovano
12	GK	ITA	Michelangelo Rampulla
13	DF	ITA	Mark Iuliano

No.	Pos.	Nation	Player
14	MF	FRA	Didier Deschamps
15	FW	ITA	Christian Vieri
16	FW	ITA	Nicola Amoruso
17	GK	ITA	Davide Falcioni
18	MF	YUG	Vladimir Jugović
19	MF	ITA	Attilio Lombardo
20	MF	ITA	Alessio Tacchinardi
21	MF	FRA	Zinedine Zidane
22	DF	ITA	Gianluca Pessotto
28	MF	ITA	Ivano Trotta
29	MF	ITA	Davide Andorno
30	MF	ITA	Nicola Cingolani
31	MF	ITA	Paolo Chivaroli

=== Transfers ===
In
Pos.	Name	from	Type
MF	Zinedine Zidane	Bordeaux	
FW	Alen Bokšić	SS Lazio	
DF	Paolo Montero	Atalanta	
FW	Christian Vieri	Atalanta	
FW	Nicola Amoruso	Padova	
MF	Raffaele Ametrano	Udinese	
DF	Dimas Teixeira	Benfica	
DF	Mark Iuliano	Salernitana	
DF	Juan Pablo Sorín	River Plate	loan ended
GK	Davide Falcioni	Olbia	

Out
Pos.	Name	To	Type
FW	Gianluca Vialli	Chelsea F.C.	free
FW	Fabrizio Ravanelli	Middlesbrough F.C.	
DF	Pietro Vierchowod	Perugia Calcio	
MF	Paulo Sousa	Borussia Dortmund	
MF	Giancarlo Marocchi	Bologna F.C.	free
DF	Massimo Carrera	Atalanta B.C.	free
DF	Juan Pablo Sorín	River Plate	
GK	Nicola Visentin	U.S. Viterbese	loan

==== Winter ====
In
Pos.	Name	from	Type

Out
Pos.	Name	To	Type
MF	Raffaele Ametrano	Hellas Verona	loan

== Competitions ==
Times from 1 July to 27 October 1996 and from 30 March to 30 June 1997 are UTC+2, from 27 October 1996 to 30 March 1997 UTC+1.

=== Serie A ===
==== League table ====
Pos	Team	Pld	W	D	L	GF	GA	GD	Pts	Qualification or relegation
1	Juventus (C)	34	17	14	3	51	24	+27	65	Qualified to Champions League group stage
2	Parma	34	18	9	7	41	26	+15	63	Qualified to Champions League qualifying round
3	Internazionale	34	15	14	5	51	35	+16	59	Qualification to UEFA Cup
4	Lazio	34	15	10	9	54	37	+17	55	Qualification to UEFA Cup
5	Udinese	34	15	9	10	53	41	+12	54	Qualification to UEFA Cup

Source: Serie A, RSSSF.com, Soccerway
Rules for classification: 1) Points; 2) Head-to-head points; 3) Head-to-head goal difference; 4) Goal difference; 5) Goals scored; 6) Draw. (Note: Head-to-head record is used only after all the matches between the teams in question have been played).
(C) Champions

==== Results by round ====
Round	1	2	3	4	5	6	7	8	9	10	11	12	13	14	15	16	17	18	19	20	21	22	23	24	25	26	27	28	29	30	31	32	33	34
Ground	A	H	A	H	A	H	A	H	H	A	H	A	H	A	A	H	A	H	A	H	A	H	A	H	A	A	H	A	H	A	H	H	A	H
Result	D	W	W	W	L	W	D	D	D	W	W	W	W	D	L	D	W	W	D	W	D	W	D	W	D	W	L	W	D	W	W	D	D	D
Position	9	5	2	1	5	1	1	3	3	4	3	1	1	1	1	1	1	1	1	1	1	1	1	1	1	1	1	1	1	1	1	1	1	1

Updated to match(es) played on 1 June 1997. Source: Competitive matches
A = Away; H = Home; W = Win; D = Draw; L = Loss; = Leader, 1997–98 UEFA Champions League Group stage; = 1997–98 UEFA Champions League Second Qualifying round; = 1997–98 UEFA Cup First round; = Relegated to 1997–98 Serie B

==== Matches ====
8 September 1996 1	Reggiana	1–1	Juventus	Reggio Emilia
16:00 CEST (UTC+02:00)	Tovalieri 9'	Report	Vieri 7'	Stadium: Stadio Giglio; Referee: Stefano Farina

15 September 1996 2	Juventus	2–1	Cagliari	Turin
16:00 CEST (UTC+02:00)	Bokšić 9'; Ferrara 58'	Report	Villa 62'	Stadium: Stadio delle Alpi; Referee: Gennaro Borriello

22 September 1996 3	Perugia	1–2	Juventus	Perugia
16:00 CEST (UTC+02:00)	Negri 90'	Report	Padovano 84'; Del Piero 89'	Stadium: Stadio Renato Curi; Referee: Graziano Cesari

29 September 1996 4	Juventus	1–0	Fiorentina	Turin
20:30 CEST (UTC+02:00)	Padovano 9'	Report		Stadium: Stadio delle Alpi; Referee: Fiorenzo Treossi

13 October 1996 5	Vicenza	2–1	Juventus	Vicenza
15:30 CEST (UTC+02:00)	Otero 19'; Beghetto 71'	Report	Ferrara 46'	Stadium: Stadio Romeo Menti; Referee: Robert Anthony Boggi

20 October 1996 6	Juventus	2–0	Internazionale	Turin
20:30 CEST (UTC+02:00)	Jugović 40'; Zidane 62'	Report		Stadium: Stadio delle Alpi; Referee: Stefano Braschi

26 October 1996 7	Roma	1–1	Juventus	Rome
20:30 CEST (UTC+02:00)	Delvecchio 90'	Report	Padovano 60'	Stadium: Stadio Olimpico; Referee: Livio Bazzoli

3 November 1996 8	Juventus	1–1	Napoli	Turin
14:30 CET (UTC+01:00)	Zidane 42'	Report	Aglietti 53'	Stadium: Stadio delle Alpi; Referee: Emilio Pellegrino

17 November 1996 9	Juventus	0–0	Milan	Turin
20:30 CET (UTC+01:00)		Report		Stadium: Stadio delle Alpi; Referee: Pierluigi Collina

11 December 1996 10	Udinese	1–4	Juventus	Udine
20:30 CET (UTC+01:00)	Cappioli 54'	Report	Bokšić 33'; Del Piero 39' (pen.), 44' (pen.); Deschamps 70'	Stadium: Stadio Friuli; Referee: Fiorenzo Treossi

1 December 1996 11	Juventus	1–0	Bologna	Turin
14:30 CET (UTC+01:00)	Zidane 51'	Report		Stadium: Stadio delle Alpi; Referee: Piero Ceccarini

8 December 1996 12	Sampdoria	0–1	Juventus	Genoa
14:30 CET (UTC+01:00)		Report	Ferrara 33'	Stadium: Stadio Luigi Ferraris; Referee: Stefano Braschi

15 December 1996 13	Juventus	3–2	Hellas Verona	Turin
14:30 CET (UTC+01:00)	Porrini 45'; Del Piero 64' (pen.), 72'	Report	Maniero 24', 44'	Stadium: Stadio delle Alpi; Referee: Angelo Bonfrisco

22 December 1996 14	Piacenza	1–1	Juventus	Piacenza
14:30 CET (UTC+01:00)	Delli Carri 86'	Report	Padovano 59'	Stadium: Stadio Leonardo Garilli; Referee: Salvatore Racalbuto

5 January 1997 15	Parma	1–0	Juventus	Parma
14:30 CET (UTC+01:00)	Chiesa 2'	Report		Stadium: Stadio Ennio Tardini; Referee: Piero Ceccarini

12 January 1997 16	Juventus	0–0	Atalanta	Turin
14:30 CET (UTC+01:00)		Report		Stadium: Stadio delle Alpi; Referee: Pierpaolo Rossi

19 January 1997 17	Lazio	0–2	Juventus	Rome
20:30 CET (UTC+01:00)		Report	Padovano 31', 62'	Stadium: Stadio Olimpico; Referee: Domenico Messina

26 January 1997 18	Juventus	3–1	Reggiana	Turin
14:30 CET (UTC+01:00)	Padovano 5'; Jugović 26'; Tacchinardi 88'	Report	Parente 90'	Stadium: Stadio delle Alpi; Referee: Cosimo Bolognino

2 February 1997 19	Cagliari	0–0	Juventus	Cagliari
14:30 CET (UTC+01:00)		Report		Stadium: Stadio Sant'Elia; Referee: Robert Anthony Boggi

16 February 1997 20	Juventus	2–1	Perugia	Turin
15:00 CET (UTC+01:00)	Del Piero 37', 45' (pen.)	Report	Materazzi 90'	Stadium: Stadio delle Alpi; Referee: Domenico Messina

23 February 1997 21	Fiorentina	1–1	Juventus	Florence
15:00 CET (UTC+01:00)	Robbiati 90'	Report	Del Piero 15'	Stadium: Stadio Artemio Franchi; Referee: Livio Bazzoli

1 March 1997 22	Juventus	2–0	Vicenza	Turin
15:00 CET (UTC+01:00)	Di Livio 22'; Padovano 62' (pen.)	Report		Stadium: Stadio delle Alpi; Referee: Massimo De Santis

9 March 1997 23	Internazionale	0–0	Juventus	Milan
20:30 CET (UTC+01:00)		Report		Stadium: San Siro; Referee: Pierluigi Collina

15 March 1997 24	Juventus	3–0	Roma	Turin
15:00 CET (UTC+01:00)	Vieri 28', 44'; Amoruso 85'	Report		Stadium: Stadio delle Alpi; Referee: Graziano Cesari

23 March 1997 25	Napoli	0–0	Juventus	Naples
15:00 CET (UTC+01:00)		Report		Stadium: Stadio San Paolo; Referee: Emilio Pellegrino

6 April 1997 26	Milan	1–6	Juventus	Milan
20:30 CEST (UTC+02:00)	Simone 76'	Report	Jugović 19', 51'; Zidane 32' (pen.); Vieri 71', 81'; Amoruso 73'	Stadium: San Siro; Referee: Stefano Braschi

13 April 1997 27	Juventus	0–3	Udinese	Turin
16:00 CEST (UTC+02:00)		Report	Amoroso 42' (pen.), 49'; Bierhoff 47'	Stadium: Stadio delle Alpi; Referee: Roberto Bettin

19 April 1997 28	Bologna	0–1	Juventus	Bologna
16:00 CEST (UTC+02:00)		Report	Bokšić 40'	Stadium: Stadio Renato Dall'Ara; Referee: Piero Ceccarini

4 May 1997 29	Juventus	0–0	Sampdoria	Turin
16:00 CEST (UTC+02:00)		Report		Stadium: Stadio delle Alpi; Referee: Domenico Messina

11 May 1997 30	Hellas Verona	0–2	Juventus	Verona
16:00 CEST (UTC+02:00)		Report	Ferrara 44'; Jugović 90'	Stadium: Stadio Marc'Antonio Bentegodi; Referee: Fiorenzo Treossi

15 May 1997 31	Juventus	4–1	Piacenza	Turin
20:30 CEST (UTC+02:00)	Zidane 51'; Vieri 54', 88'; Jugović 76'	Report	Luiso 56'	Stadium: Stadio delle Alpi; Referee: Graziano Cesari

18 May 1997 32	Juventus	1–1	Parma	Turin
16:30 CEST (UTC+02:00)	Amoruso 43' (pen.)	Report	Zidane 29' (o.g.)	Stadium: Stadio delle Alpi; Referee: Pierluigi Collina

23 May 1997 33	Atalanta	1–1	Juventus	Bergamo
20:30 CEST (UTC+02:00)	Inzaghi 19'	Report	Iuliano 54'	Stadium: Stadio Atleti Azzurri d'Italia; Referee: Roberto Bettin

1 June 1997 34	Juventus	2–2	Lazio	Turin
16:30 CEST (UTC+02:00)	Vieri 31'; Amoruso 52'	Report	Casiraghi 73'; Protti 85'	Stadium: Stadio delle Alpi; Referee: Salvatore Racalbuto

=== Coppa Italia ===
==== Second round ====
28 August 1996	Fidelis Andria	0–2	Juventus	Barletta
20:30			Vieri 7'; Conte 38'	Stadium: Stadio degli Ulivi; Referee: Marcello Nicchi

==== Third round ====
23 October 1996	Nocerina	0–0	Juventus	Avellino
20:30			Torricelli (red card) 48'	Stadium: Stadio Partenio; Referee: Roberto Bettin

6 November 1996 Replay	Juventus	2–1	Nocerina	Turin
20:30	Montero 45'; Di Rocco 48' (o.g.); Trotta (red card) 87'		Marchegiani 39'	Stadium: Stadio delle Alpi; Referee: Angelo Bonfrisco

==== Quarterfinals ====
13 November 1996 1	Juventus	0–3	Internazionale	Turin
20:30			Zamorano 32'; Ince 76'; Djorkaeff 89'	Stadium: delle Alpi; Referee: Graziano Cesari

18 December 1996 2	Internazionale	1–1	Juventus	Milan
20:30	Ganz 32'		Amoruso 45'	Stadium: Giuseppe Meazza; Referee: Marcello Nicchi

=== UEFA Champions League ===
==== Group stage ====
Group C
Team	Pld	W	D	L	GF	GA	GD	Pts
(Italy) Juventus	6	5	1	0	11	1	+10	16
(England) Manchester United	6	3	0	3	6	3	+3	9
(Turkey) Fenerbahçe	6	2	1	3	3	6	–3	7
(Austria) Rapid Wien	6	0	2	4	2	12	-10	2

11 September 1996 1	Juventus (Italy)	1–0	(England) Manchester United	Turin, Italy
20:30 CEST (UTC+02:00)	Bokšić 34', (yellow card) 45'; Deschamps (yellow card) 63'; Peruzzi (yellow card) 90'	Report	G. Neville (yellow card) 29'; Cruyff (yellow card) 43'	Stadium: Stadio delle Alpi; Attendance: 50,000; Referee: Markus Merk (Germany)

25 September 1996 2	Fenerbahçe (Turkey)	0–1	(Italy) Juventus	Istanbul, Turkey
20:30 CEST (UTC+02:00)		Report	Bokšić 22'	Stadium: Şükrü Saracoğlu Stadium; Attendance: 29,000; Referee: Serge Muhmenthaler (Switzerland)

16 October 1996 3	Rapid Wien (Austria)	1–1	(Italy) Juventus	Vienna, Austria
20:30 CEST (UTC+02:00)	Lesiak 20'; Mandreko (yellow card) 74'	Report	Vieri 9'; Porrini (yellow card) 83'	Stadium: Ernst-Happel-Stadion; Attendance: 46,500; Referee: Kim Milton Nielsen (Denmark)

30 October 1996 4	Juventus (Italy)	5–0	(Austria) Rapid Wien	Turin, Italy
20:30 CET (UTC+01:00)	Bokšić 5', 59'; Montero 26'; Del Piero 29', 75'	Report	Penksa (yellow card) 13'; Zingler (yellow card) 81'	Stadium: Stadio delle Alpi; Attendance: 26,143; Referee: Hugh Dallas (Scotland)

20 November 1996 5	Manchester United (England)	0–1	(Italy) Juventus	Manchester, England
20:30 CET (UTC+01:00)	Cantona (yellow card) 27'	Report	Del Piero 36' (pen.); Jugović (yellow card) 60'; Torricelli (yellow card) 63'; Ferrara (yellow card) 76'	Stadium: Old Trafford; Attendance: 53,529; Referee: José María García Aranda (Spain)

4 December 1996 6	Juventus (Italy)	2–0	(Turkey) Fenerbahçe	Turin, Italy
20:30 CET (UTC+01:00)	Padovano 42'; Amoruso 85'	Report		Stadium: Stadio delle Alpi; Attendance: 13,000; Referee: Bernd Heynemann (Germany)

==== Knockout phase ====
===== Quarter-finals =====
5 March 1997 First leg	Rosenborg (Norway)	1–1	(Italy) Juventus	Trondheim, Norway
20:30 CET (UTC+01:00)	Soltvedt 51'	Report	Vieri 52'; Iuliano (yellow card) 63'	Stadium: Lerkendal Stadion; Attendance: 20,246; Referee: Marc Batta (France)

19 March 1997 Second leg	Juventus (Italy)	2–0 (3–1 agg.)	(Norway) Rosenborg	Turin, Italy
20:30 CET (UTC+01:00)	Zidane 29'; Amoruso 90' (pen.)	Report	Stensaas (red card) 88'	Stadium: Stadio delle Alpi; Attendance: 35,371; Referee: Vítor Melo Pereira (Portugal)

===== Semi-finals =====
9 April 1997 First leg	Ajax (Netherlands)	1–2	(Italy) Juventus	Amsterdam, Netherlands
20:30 CEST (UTC+02:00)	Litmanen 66'	Report	Amoruso 14'; Vieri 41'; Di Livio (yellow card) 64'; Tacchinardi (yellow card) 70'; Jugović (yellow card) 85'	Stadium: Amsterdam Arena; Attendance: 53,000; Referee: Antonio Jesús López Nieto (Spain)

23 April 1997 Second leg	Juventus (Italy)	4–1 (6–2 agg.)	(Netherlands) Ajax	Turin, Italy
20:30 CEST (UTC+02:00)	Lombardo 34'; Vieri 36', (yellow card) 65'; Amoruso 79'; Zidane 81'	Report	Bogarde (yellow card) 43'; Melchiot 76'	Stadium: Stadio delle Alpi; Attendance: 62,377; Referee: Kim Milton Nielsen (Denmark)

===== Final =====
28 May 1997 Final	Borussia Dortmund (Germany)	3–1	(Italy) Juventus	Munich, Germany
20:30 CEST (UTC+02:00)	Paulo Sousa (yellow card) 23'; Riedle 29', 34'; Ricken (yellow card) 71', (goal) 71'	Report	Porrini (yellow card) 19'; Del Piero 65'; Iuliano (yellow card) 90'	Stadium: Olympiastadion; Attendance: 59,000; Referee: Sándor Puhl (Hungary)

=== Intercontinental Cup ===
26 November 1996	Juventus (Italy)	1–0	(Argentina) River Plate	Tokyo, Japan
11:15	Del Piero 81'	Report		Stadium: National Stadium; Attendance: 48,305; Referee: Márcio Rezende de Freitas (Brazil)

=== UEFA Super Cup ===
15 January 1997 First leg	Paris Saint-Germain (France)	1–6	(Italy) Juventus	Paris, France
20:30	Raí 53' (pen.); Fournier (red card) 64'		Porrini 5'; Padovano 22', 40'; Ferrara 36'; Lombardo 83'; Amoruso 89'	Stadium: Parc des Princes; Attendance: 29,519; Referee: Nikolai Levnikov (Russia)

5 February 1997 Second leg	Juventus (Italy)	3–1 (9–2 agg.)	(France) Paris Saint-Germain	Palermo, Italy
20:30	Del Piero 36', 70'; Vieri 90'		Raí 64' (pen.)	Stadium: Stadio La Favorita; Attendance: 35,100; Referee: Serge Muhmenthaler (Switzerland)

== Statistics ==
=== Players statistics ===
No.	Pos	Nat	Player	Total		Serie A		Coppa Italia		UEFA Champions League	
No.	Pos	Nat	Player	Apps	Goals	Apps	Goals	Apps	Goals	Apps	Goals
1	GK	(Italy) ITA	Peruzzi	40	-26	29	-19	2	-1	9	-6
6	DF	(Portugal) POR	Dimas	18	0	16+1	0	1	0	0	0
2	DF	(Italy) ITA	Ferrara	46	4	32	4	3	0	11	0
4	DF	(Uruguay) URU	Montero	40	2	26	0	3	1	11	1
5	DF	(Italy) ITA	Porrini	37	1	19+4	1	5	0	9	0
7	MF	(Italy) ITA	Di Livio	47	1	27+5	1	4	0	11	0
14	MF	(France) FRA	Deschamps	39	1	26	1	3	0	10	0
21	MF	(France) FRA	Zidane	41	7	28+1	5	2	0	10	2
18	MF	(Federal Republic of Yugoslavia) YUG	Jugovic	40	6	26+4	6	3	0	7	0
15	FW	(Italy) ITA	Vieri	36	13	15+8	8	5	1	8	4
10	FW	(Italy) ITA	Del Piero	32	12	18+4	8	4	0	6	4
12	GK	(Italy) ITA	Rampulla	11	-9	5+1	-4	3	-4	2	-1
9	FW	(Croatia) CRO	Boksic	32	7	20+2	3	2	0	8	4
22	DF	(Italy) ITA	Pessotto	27	0	16+4	0	2	0	5	0
3	DF	(Italy) ITA	Torricelli	25	0	15+2	0	3	0	5	0
20	MF	(Italy) ITA	Tacchinardi	31	1	14+5	1	3	0	9	0
11	FW	(Italy) ITA	Padovano	27	9	12+8	8	2	0	5	1
16	FW	(Italy) ITA	Amoruso	34	9	10+13	4	4	1	7	4
13	DF	(Italy) ITA	Iuliano	32	1	9+12	1	4	0	7	0
19	MF	(Italy) ITA	Lombardo	32	1	8+14	0	4	0	6	1
8	MF	(Italy) ITA	Conte	10	1	3+3	0	1	1	3	0
17	GK	(Italy) ITA	Falcioni	1	-1	0+1	-1	0	0	0	0
28	MF	(Italy) ITA	Trotta	4	0	0+1	0	2	0	1	0
30	MF	(Italy) ITA	Cingolani	2	0	0+1	0	1	0	0	0
31	MF	(Italy) ITA	Ametrano	3	0	0+1	0	2	0	0	0

- Source: http://calcio-seriea.net/presenze/1996/1119/
