= 1996–97 Atlético Madrid season =

91st season in existence of Atlético Madrid

Atlético Madrid
1996–97 season
- President: Jesús Gil
- Head coach: Radomir Antić
- Stadium: Vicente Calderón
- La Liga: 5th (qual. for 1997–98 UEFA Cup)
- Copa del Rey: Quarter-finals
- Supercopa de España: Runners-up
- Champions League: Quarter-finals
- Top goalscorer: League: Esnaider (16); All: Esnaider (19)
Home colours	Away colours	Third colours

The 1996–1997 campaign was the 91st season in Atlético Madrid's history and their 62nd season in La Liga, the top division of Spanish football.

== Squad ==
Squad at end of season

Note: Flags indicate national team as defined under FIFA eligibility rules; some limited exceptions apply. Players may hold more than one non-FIFA nationality.

No.	Pos.	Nation	Player
1	GK	ESP	José Francisco Molina
2	DF	ESP	Pablo Alfaro
3	DF	ESP	Toni
4	DF	ESP	Roberto Solozábal (captain)
5	DF	ESP	Juan Manuel López
6	DF	ESP	Santi
7	FW	ARG	Leonardo Biagini
8	MF	ESP	Juan Vizcaíno
9	FW	ARG	Juan Esnáider
10	MF	YUG	Milinko Pantić
13	GK	ESP	Ricardo
14	MF	ARG	Diego Simeone
17	FW	ESP	Juan Carlos

No.	Pos.	Nation	Player
18	MF	ESP	Roberto
19	FW	ESP	Kiko
20	DF	ESP	Delfí Geli
21	MF	ESP	José Luis Caminero
23	DF	ROU	Daniel Prodan
24	MF	CZE	Radek Bejbl
26	MF	RSA	Quinton Fortune
27	MF	YUG	Veljko Paunović
28	FW	ESP	Santiago Ezquerro
29	MF	YUG	Đorđe Tomić
30	MF	ESP	Ivo
31	FW	ESP	Yordi

=== Transfers ===
In
Pos.	Name	from	Type
FW	Juan Esnaider	Real Madrid	
MF	Radek Bejbl	Slavia Praha	
DF	Carlos Aguilera	CD Tenerife	
MF	Pablo Alfaro	Racing Santander	
MF	Veljko Paunovic	Marbella	

Out
Pos.	Name	To	Type
FW	Lyuboslav Penev	SD Compostela	
FW	Fernando Correa	Sevilla FC	loan
MF	José de la Sagra	FC Barcelona B	
DF	Tomás Reñones	CA Marbella	
MF	Pirri	SD Compostela	

==== Winter ====
In
Pos.	Name	from	Type
DF	Daniel Prodan	Steaua București	
FW	Yordi	Sevilla FC	
DF	Đorđe Tomić	Guingamp	
FW	Santiago Ezquerro	Osasuna	

Out
Pos.	Name	To	Type
DF	Ivan Rocha	CD Logroñes	loan

== Competitions ==
=== La Liga ===
==== League table ====
Pos	Team	Pld	W	D	L	GF	GA	GD	Pts	Qualification or relegation
3	Deportivo La Coruña	42	21	14	7	57	30	+27	77 (Note: BET 1–2 DEP; DEP 3–0 BET)	Qualification for the UEFA Cup first round
4	Real Betis	42	21	14	7	81	46	+35	77	Qualification for the Cup Winners' Cup first round (Note: Since Barcelona, winners of 1996–97 Copa del Rey, was qualified for the 1997–98 UEFA Champions League, losing cup finalists Real Betis earned a spot in the first round of the 1997–98 UEFA Cup Winners' Cup.)
5	Atlético Madrid	42	20	11	11	76	64	+12	71	Qualification for the UEFA Cup first round
6	Athletic Bilbao	42	16	16	10	72	57	+15	64 (Note: VLD 0–0 ATH; ATH 0–0 VLD)	Qualification for the UEFA Cup first round
7	Valladolid	42	18	10	14	57	46	+11	64	Qualification for the UEFA Cup first round

Source: LFP
Rules for classification: 1) points; 2) head-to-head points; 3) head-to-head goal difference; 4) head-to-head goals scored; 5) goal difference; 6) number of goals scored.

==== Results by round ====
Round	1	2	3	4	5	6	7	8	9	10	11	12	13	14	15	16	17	18	19	20	21	22	23	24	25	26	27	28	29	30	31	32	33	34	35	36	37	38	39	40	41	42
Ground	H	A	H	A	H	A	H	A	H	A	H	A	H	A	H	A	H	A	H	H	A	H	A	H	A	H	A	H	A	H	A	H	A	H	A	H	A	A	H	A	A	H
Result	W	L	L	W	W	D	D	L	L	W	W	D	W	W	W	D	D	W	W	L	D	W	D	W	W	W	L	L	W	W	L	L	D	W	D	W	W	D	D	W	L	L
Position	4	9	17	11	6	7	6	10	14	12	6	6	7	5	5	5	5	5	5	6	5	6	4	4	4	4	4	5	5	5	5	5	5	5	5	5	5	5	5	5	5	5

Source: Competitive matches
A = Away; H = Home; W = Win; D = Draw; L = Loss; = Leader, 1997–98 UEFA Champions League Group stage; = 1997–98 UEFA Champions League Second qualifying round; = 1997–98 UEFA Cup First round

==== Matches ====
31 August 1996 1	Atlético de Madrid	2-0	RC Celta	Madrid
	Esnaider 46'; Kiko 49'			Stadium: Santiago Bernabéu; Attendance: 50,000

6 September 1996 2	SD Compostela	3-1	Atlético de Madrid	Santiago de Compostela
	Nacho 28'; Ohen 64'; Viedma 70'		45' Esnaider	Attendance: 12,000

14 September 1996 3	Atlético de Madrid	0-2	Deportivo La Coruña	Madrid
			53' Rivaldo; 74' Martins	Stadium: Vicente Calderón; Attendance: 30,000

21 September 1996 4	CD Logroñés	0-3	Atlético de Madrid	Logroñés
			Bejbl 28'; Esnaider 45'; 70' Kiko	Attendance: 12,000

30 September 1996 5	Atlético de Madrid	3-0	Hércules CF	Madrid
	Toni 3'; Geli 57'; Caminero 90'			Stadium: Vicente Calderón; Attendance: 30,000

2 October 1996 6	Sevilla FC	0-0	Atlético de Madrid	Sevilla
				Stadium: Sanchez Pizjuan

12 October 1996 7	Atlético de Madrid	2-2	Real Betis	Madrid
	Juan Carlos 9'; Simeone 17'		1' Alfonso; 84' Sabas	Stadium: Vicente Calderón; Attendance: 40,000

20 October 1996 8	Valencia CF	3-1	Atlético de Madrid	Valencia
	Poyatos 37'; Vlaovic 50'; Claudio Lopez 90'		88' Esnaider	Stadium: Mestalla; Attendance: 45,000

23 October 1996 9	Atlético de Madrid	1-3	Rayo Vallecano	Madrid
	Juan Carlos 89'		17' Guilherme; 46' Andrijasevic; 70' Cota	Stadium: Vicente Calderón; Attendance: 30,000

25 October 1996 10	Sporting de Gijón	0-1	Atlético de Madrid	Gijón
			78' Roberto	Attendance: 16,900

2 November 1996 11	Atlético de Madrid	3-0	Real Oviedo	Madrid
	Caminero 35'; Esnaider 72'; Esnaider 86' (pen.)			Stadium: Vicente Calderón; Attendance: 35,000

9 November 1996 12	FC Barcelona	3–3	Atlético de Madrid	Barcelona
	Pizzi 15'; Luis Enrique 29'; Giovanni 78'		Caminero 6'; Vizcaíno 61'; Esnaider 73' (pen.)	Stadium: Camp Nou; Attendance: 95,000

16 November 1996 13	Atlético de Madrid	2-1	RCD Espanyol	Madrid
	Caminero 47'; Santi 63'		80' Javi	Stadium: Vicente Calderón; Attendance: 25,000

24 November 1996 14	Real Valladolid	0-3	Atlético	Valladolid
			30' Vizcaino; 53' Caminero; 66' (o.g.) Santamaria	Stadium: José Zorrilla

30 November 1996 15	Atlético de Madrid	1-0	Racing de Santander	Madrid
	Esnaider 22'			Stadium: Vicente Calderón; Attendance: 40,000

7 December 1996 16	Athletic de Bilbao	1-1	Atlético de Madrid	Bilbao
	Etxebarria 67'		40' Pantic	Stadium: San Mamés; Attendance: 40,000

21 December 1996 17	Atlético	2-2	Real Sociedad	Madrid
	Fuentes 32' (o.g.); Kiko 62'		3' Craioveanu; 23' De Paula 23	Stadium: Vicente Calderón; Attendance: 30,000

4 January 1997 18	CF Extremadura	2-4	Atlético de Madrid	Extremadura
	Juanito 80' (pen.); Dure 90'		23' Prodan; 53' Kiko; 68' Kiko; 70' Juan Carlos	Attendance: 10,000

11 January 1997 19	Atlético de Madrid	5-1	Real Zaragoza	Madrid
	Caminero 1'; Paunovic 38'; Kiko 45'; Kiko 54'; Esnaider 67' (pen.)		53' Higuera	Stadium: Vicente Calderón; Referee: 35,000

18 January 1997 20	Atlético de Madrid	1-4	Real Madrid	Madrid
	Kiko 32'		47' Raul; 83' Raul; 85'Seedorf; 90' Victor	Stadium: Vicente Calderón; Attendance: 50,000

1 February 1997 22	RC Celta	1-1	Atlético de Madrid	Vigo
	Ratkovic 60'		84' Prodan	Stadium: Balaídos; Attendance: 20,000

9 February 1997 23	Atlético de Madrid	4-1	SD Compostela	Madrid
	Caminero 31'; Bejbl 38'; Esnaider 55'; Esnaider 63' (pen.)		29'Mauro	Stadium: Vicente Calderón; Attendance: 30,000

15 February 1997 24	Deportivo La Coruña	0-0	Atlético de Madrid	La Coruña
				Stadium: Riazor; Attendance: 12,000

18 February 1997 25	Atlético de Madrid	2–0	CD Logroñés	Madrid
	Biagini 33'; Santi 67'			Stadium: Vicente Calderón; Attendance: 30,000

22 February 1997 26	Hércules CF	0-2	Atlético de Madrid	Alicante
			23' Prodan; 28' Pantic	Attendance: 15,000

1 March 1997 27	Atlético de Madrid	3-2	Sevilla CF	Madrid
	Caminero 21'; Caminero 23'; Kiko 46'		1' Jose Mari; 50' Loren	Stadium: Vicente Calderón; Attendance: 40,000

8 March 1997 28	Real Betis	3-2	Atlético de Madrid	Sevilla
	Alfonso 36'; Alfonso 53'; Alfonso 90'		29' Esnaider; 68' (o.g.) Vidakovic	Attendance: 43,000

15 March 1997 29	Atlético de Madrid	1-4	Valencia CF	Madrid
	Caminero 51'		8' Ortega; 26' Eskurza; 35' Jose Ignacio; 90' Leandro	Stadium: Vicente Calderón

22 March 1997 30	Rayo Vallecano	1-2	Atlético de Madrid	Madrid
	Klimowicz 57'		86' Prodan; 88' (pen.) Pantic	Stadium: Vallecas; Attendance: 9,000

31 March 1997 31	Atlético de Madrid	2-1	Sporting de Gijón	Madrid
	Caminero 11'; Kiko 40'		65' David Cano	Stadium: Vicente Calderón; Attendance: 20,000

5 April 1997 32	Real Oviedo	4-1	Atlético de Madrid	Oviedo
	Oli 3'; Oli 21' (pen.); Ivan Iglesias 25'; Ivan Iglesias 45'		Esnaider 48	Stadium: Carlos Tartierre; Attendance: 13,000

13 April 1997 33	Atlético de Madrid	2–5	FC Barcelona	Madrid
	Kiko 13' Kiko 63' Santi (yellow card) 74' (yellow-red card) Simeone (red card) Pablo Alfaro (yellow card) Prodan (yellow card) Pantic (yellow card) Fortune (yellow card)		De La Peña 40' Ronaldo 42' Ronaldo 58' Ronaldo 74' Figo 88' Popescu (yellow card) Roger Garcia (yellow card)	Stadium: Vicente Calderón; Attendance: 52,00; Referee: Dauden Ibañez

17 April 1997 34	RCD Espanyol	0-0	Atlético de Madrid	Barcelona
				Stadium: Montjuic; Attendance: 15,000

19 April 1997 35	Atlético de Madrid	3–1	Real Valladolid	Madrid
	Aguilera 21'; Caminero 84'; Aguilera 87'		Quevedo 89'	Stadium: Vicente Calderón; Attendance: 15,000

4 May 1997 36	Racing de Santander	1-1	Atlético de Madrid	Santander
	Merino 14'		34' Caminero	Stadium: El Sardinero; Attendance: 20,000

10 May 1997 37	Atlético de Madrid	2-1	Athletic de Bilbao	Madrid
	Karanka 13' (o.g.); Kiko 73'		30' Carlos Garcia	Stadium: Vicente Calderón; Attendance: 40,000

15 May 1997 21	CD Tenerife	2-3	Atlético de Madrid	Tenerife
	Jokanovic 16'; Kodro 30'		13' Pantic 13; 52' Esnaider; 71' Simeone 71	Stadium: Gran Canaria; Attendance: 14,000

17 May 1997 38	Real Sociedad	1–1	Atlético de Madrid	San Sebastián
	Craioveanu 74'		84' Roberto	Attendance: 23,000

24 May 1997 39	Atlético de Madrid	1–1	CF Extremadura	Madrid
	Simeone 50'		20' Pedro Jose	Stadium: Vicente Calderón; Attendance: 22,000

2 June 1997 40	Real Zaragoza	2-3	Atlético de Madrid	Zaragoza
	Morientes 50'; Higuera 72'		20' Esnaider; 28' Pantic; 65'Caminero	Stadium: La Romareda; Attendance: 25,000

13 June 1997 41	Real Madrid	3-1	Atlético de Madrid	Madrid
	Raul 37'; Hierro 44'; Mijatovic 56'		65' Esnaider	Stadium: Santiago Bernabéu; Attendance: 103,000

23 June 1997 42	Atlético de Madrid	0-3	CD Tenerife	Madrid
			2' Felipe; 50' Juanele; 67' Vivar Dorado	Stadium: Vicente Calderón; Attendance: 18,000

=== Copa del Rey ===
Round of 16

29 January 1997	Atlético de Madrid	2-0	SD Compostela	Madrid
				Stadium: Vicente Calderón

4 February 1997	SD Compostela	2-3	Atlético de Madrid	Santiago de Compostela

Quarterfinals

26 February 1997	Atlético de Madrid	2–2	FC Barcelona	Madrid
	Caminero 19' Kiko 72'		Pizzi 43'pen Pizzi 64'	Stadium: Vicente Calderón; Attendance: 45,000; Referee: Mejuto González

12 March 1997	FC Barcelona	5–4	Atlético de Madrid	Barcelona
	Ronaldo 47' Ronaldo 51' Figo 67' Ronaldo 72' Pizzi 81'		Pantic 8' Pantic 28' Pantic 31'pen Pantic 52'	Stadium: Camp Nou; Attendance: 90,000; Referee: Gracia Redondo

=== Supercopa de España ===
25 August 1996	FC Barcelona	5–2	Atlético de Madrid	Barcelona
	Ronaldo 5' Giovanni 31' Pizzi 74' De la Peña 76' Ronaldo 89'		Esnaider 37' Pantic 57'pen	Stadium: Montjuic; Attendance: 37,500; Referee: Fernandez Marin

28 August 1996	Atlético de Madrid	3-1	FC Barcelona	Madrid
	Sergi 32'(o.g) Esnaider 65' Pantic 76'		Stoichkov 58'	Stadium: Vicente Calderón; Attendance: 15,000; Referee: Ansuategui Roca

=== 1996–97 UEFA Champions League ===
==== Group phase ====
Pos	Team	Pld	W	D	L	GF	GA	GD	Pts	Qualification	ATM	DOR	WID	STE
1	(Spain) Atlético Madrid	6	4	1	1	12	4	+8	13	Advance to knockout stage	—	0–1	1–0	4–0
2	(Germany) Borussia Dortmund	6	4	1	1	14	8	+6	13	Advance to knockout stage	1–2	—	2–1	5–3
3	(Poland) Widzew Łódź	6	1	1	4	6	10	−4	4		1–4	2–2	—	2–0
4	(Romania) Steaua București	6	1	1	4	5	15	−10	4		1–1	0–3	1–0	—

Source: UEFA

===== Matches =====
11 September 1996 1	Atlético de Madrid (Spain)	4-0	(Romania) Steaua Bucharest	Madrid
				Stadium: Vicente Calderón; Attendance: 47,000; Referee: (Denmark) Kim Milton Nielsen

25 September 1996 2	Widzew Łódź (Poland)	1-4	(Spain) Atlético de Madrid	Łódź
				Stadium: Ludwika Sobolewskiego; Attendance: 18,000; Referee: (Sweden) Anders Frisk

16 October 1996 3	Atlético de Madrid (Spain)	0-1	(Germany) Borussia Dortmund	Madrid
				Stadium: Vicente Calderón; Attendance: 50,000; Referee: (Belgium) Michel Piraux

30 October 1996 4	Borussia Dortmund (Germany)	1-2	(Spain) Atlético de Madrid	Dortmund
				Stadium: Westfalenstadion; Attendance: 45,000; Referee: (Hungary) Laszlo Vagner

20 November 1996 5	Steaua Bucharest (Romania)	1-1	(Spain) Atlético de Madrid	Bucharest, Romania
				Stadium: Ghencea; Attendance: 10,000; Referee: (Switzerland) Urs Meier

4 December 1996 6	Atlético de Madrid (Spain)	1-0	(Poland) Widzew Łódź	Madrid
				Stadium: Vicente Calderón; Attendance: 40,000; Referee: (Czech Republic) Vaclav Krondl

==== Quarterfinals ====
5 March 1997 1	Ajax (Netherlands)	1–1	(Spain) Atletico Madrid	Amsterdam
20:30	Kluivert 53'	Report	8' Esnáider	Stadium: Amsterdam Arena; Attendance: 51,000; Referee: (Germany) Markus Merk

19 March 1997 2	Atlético Madrid (Spain)	2–3 (a.e.t.)	(Netherlands) Ajax	Madrid
20:30	Kiko 29'; Esnaider (penalty missed) 75'; Pantić 105' (pen.)	Report	49' R. de Boer; 100' Dani; 119' Babangida	Stadium: Vicente Calderon; Attendance: 50,018; Referee: (Switzerland) Serge Muhmenthaler

== Statistics ==
=== Players statistics ===
No.	Pos	Nat	Player	Total		La Liga		Copa del Rey		Champions League	
No.	Pos	Nat	Player	Apps	Goals	Apps	Goals	Apps	Goals	Apps	Goals
1	GK	(Spain) ESP	Molina	53	-79	41	-62	4	-9	8	-8
20	DF	(Spain) ESP	Geli	40	1	29+1	1	2	0	8	0
4	DF	(Spain) ESP	Solozabal	39	0	27+3	0	1+1	0	7	0
6	DF	(Spain) ESP	Santi Denia	47	2	36+1	2	3	0	7	0
3	DF	(Spain) ESP	Toni Munoz	43	2	34	1	3	1	6	0
10	MF	(Federal Republic of Yugoslavia) YUG	Pantic	48	14	37	5	2+1	4	8	5
14	MF	(Argentina) ARG	Simeone	41	7	30+1	3	3	0	7	4
24	MF	(Czech Republic) CZE	Bejbl	45	2	29+4	2	3+1	0	7+1	0
21	MF	(Spain) ESP	Caminero	38	15	27+3	14	4	1	4	0
19	FW	(Spain) ESP	Kiko	47	18	36	13	4	3	7	2
9	FW	(Argentina) ARG	Esnaider	45	19	34+1	16	2	0	8	3
13	GK	(Spain) ESP	Ricardo	1	-2	1	-2	0	0	0	0
15	DF	(Spain) ESP	Carlos Aguilera	43	2	21+10	2	3+1	0	5+3	0
8	MF	(Spain) ESP	Vizcaino	33	2	17+11	2	0+1	0	2+2	0
23	DF	(Romania) ROU	Prodan	19	4	16+1	4	2	0	0	0
5	DF	(Spain) ESP	Juanma López	34	1	11+14	0	2	1	1+6	0
18	MF	(Spain) ESP	Roberto	32	3	8+19	2	1+2	0	1+1	1
27	MF	(Federal Republic of Yugoslavia) YUG	Paunovic	20	1	8+8	1	2+1	0	0+1	0
7	FW	(Argentina) ARG	Biagini	27	2	7+15	1	1+2	1	0+2	0
17	FW	(Spain) ESP	Juan Carlos	24	3	5+15	3	0+1	0	0+3	0
2	DF	(Spain) ESP	Pablo Alfaro	17	0	5+6	0	2	0	2+2	0
28	FW	(Spain) ESP	Ezquerro	4	0	3+1	0	0	0	0	0
30	MF	(Spain) ESP	Ivo	1	0	1	0	0	0	0	0
26	MF	(South Africa) RSA	Fortune	2	0	0+2	0	0	0	0	0
29	MF	(Federal Republic of Yugoslavia) YUG	Tomic	3	0	0+3	0	0	0	0	0
31	FW	(Spain) ESP	Yordi	1	0	0+1	0	0	0	0	0

- Source: https://www.bdfutbol.com/es/t/t1996-977.html

== See also ==
- Atlético Madrid
- 1996–97 La Liga
- 1996–97 Copa del Rey
- 1996–97 UEFA Champions League
- 1996 Supercopa de España
