= 1996–97 FC Barcelona season =

98th season in existence of FC Barcelona

FC Barcelona
1996–97 season
- President: Josep Lluís Núñez
- Head Coach: Bobby Robson
- Stadium: Camp Nou
- La Liga: Runners-up (in UEFA Champions League)
- Copa del Rey: Winners
- Supercopa de España: Winners
- UEFA Cup Winners' Cup: Winners
- Top goalscorer: League: Ronaldo (34); All: Ronaldo (47)
Home colours	Away colours

The 1996–97 season was FC Barcelona's 98th season in existence and 68th consecutive season in the top flight of Spanish football, La Liga.

== Summary ==
Before being dismissed by the club as head coach in May 1996, Johan Cruyff sought to reinforce the club for the upcoming season. While bids for Zinedine Zidane, David Ginola, Ryan Giggs, Aron Winter, and goalkeeper José Francisco Molina all proved unsuccessful, Laurent Blanc, Juan Antonio Pizzi and Luis Enrique did join the club.

The team enjoyed a decent season, winning both Copa del Rey and UEFA Cup Winners' Cup, but extended its run without winning the league title to three years, coming second to Real Madrid. The season's end saw major departures: Bobby Robson was replaced as coach by Louis Van Gaal and Ronaldo, the club's top scorer with 47 goals, made a surprise switch to Inter Milan.

== Squad ==
Squad at end of season

Note: Flags indicate national team as defined under FIFA eligibility rules; some limited exceptions apply. Players may hold more than one non-FIFA nationality.

No.	Pos.	Nation	Player
1	GK	POR	Vítor Baía
2	DF	ESP	Albert Ferrer
3	DF	ESP	Abelardo
4	MF	ESP	Pep Guardiola (vice-captain)
5	MF	ROU	Gheorghe Popescu (captain)
6	MF	ESP	José Mari Bakero (captain)
7	MF	POR	Luís Figo
8	FW	BUL	Hristo Stoichkov
9	FW	BRA	Ronaldo
10	MF	BRA	Giovanni
11	FW	ESP	Ángel Cuéllar
12	DF	ESP	Sergi
13	GK	ESP	Carles Busquets
15	DF	FRA	Laurent Blanc

No.	Pos.	Nation	Player
16	MF	ESP	Óscar
17	MF	NGR	Emmanuel Amunike
18	MF	ESP	Guillermo Amor
19	FW	ESP	Juan Antonio Pizzi
20	DF	ESP	Miguel Ángel Nadal
21	MF	ESP	Luis Enrique
22	MF	CRO	Robert Prosinečki
23	MF	ESP	Iván de la Peña
24	DF	POR	Fernando Couto
25	GK	ESP	Julen Lopetegui
26	MF	ESP	Albert Celades
27	MF	ESP	Roger
28	GK	ESP	Francesc Arnau

=== Transfers ===
In
Pos.	Name	from	Type
FW	Ronaldo	PSV Eindhoven	U$20,0million
DF	Laurent Blanc	AJ Auxerre	free
MF	Luis Enrique	Real Madrid	free
FW	Juan Antonio Pizzi	CD Tenerife	free
FW	Hristo Stoichkov	Parma	€2.4 million
MF	Goran Vucevic	CP Merida	loan ended
MF	Giovanni	Santos FC	€5.5 million
GK	Vítor Baía	FC Porto	€6.5 million
DF	Fernando Couto	Parma FC	€5.5 million

Out
Pos.	Name	To	Type
FW	Jordi Cruyff	Manchester United	-
MF	Gheorghe Hagi	Galatasaray SK	-
FW	Meho Kodro	CD Tenerife	-
MF	Juan Carlos Moreno	Albacete Balompié	-
DF	Thomas Christiansen	Real Oviedo	-
MF	Toni Velamazán	Real Oviedo	-
DF	García Pimienta	CF Extremadura	-

==== Winter ====
In
Pos.	Name	from	Type
MF	Emmanuel Amunike	Sporting Lisboa	€3.0 million

Out
Pos.	Name	To	Type
FW	Robert Prosinecki	Sevilla CF	-
MF	Jose Mari Bakero	CD Veracruz	-

== Competitions ==
=== La Liga ===
==== League table ====
Pos	Team	Pld	W	D	L	GF	GA	GD	Pts	Qualification or relegation
1	Real Madrid (C)	42	27	11	4	85	36	+49	92	Qualification for the Champions League group stage
2	Barcelona	42	28	6	8	102	48	+54	90	Qualification for the Champions League second qualifying round
3	Deportivo La Coruña	42	21	14	7	57	30	+27	77 (Note: BET 1–2 DEP; DEP 3–0 BET)	Qualification for the UEFA Cup first round
4	Real Betis	42	21	14	7	81	46	+35	77	Qualification for the Cup Winners' Cup first round (Note: Since Barcelona, winners of 1996–97 Copa del Rey, was qualified for the 1997–98 UEFA Champions League, losing cup finalists Real Betis earned a spot in the first round of the 1997–98 UEFA Cup Winners' Cup.)
5	Atlético Madrid	42	20	11	11	76	64	+12	71	Qualification for the UEFA Cup first round

Source: LFP
Rules for classification: 1) points; 2) head-to-head points; 3) head-to-head goal difference; 4) head-to-head goals scored; 5) goal difference; 6) number of goals scored.
(C) Champions

==== Results by round ====
Round	1	2	3	4	5	6	7	8	9	10	11	12	13	14	15	16	17	18	19	20	21	22	23	24	25	26	27	28	29	30	31	32	33	34	35	36	37	38	39	40	41	42
Ground	A	H	A	H	A	H	A	H	A	H	A	H	H	A	H	A	H	A	H	A	H	H	A	H	A	H	A	H	A	H	A	H	A	A	H	A	H	A	H	A	H	A
Result	W	W	D	W	W	D	W	W	W	W	D	D	W	L	W	L	W	W	L	W	W	D	L	W	L	W	L	W	W	W	D	W	W	L	W	W	W	W	W	L	W	W
Position	3	3	2	2	1	2	1	1	1	1	1	1	1	2	2	3	2	2	2	2	2	2	3	2	2	2	2	2	2	2	2	2	2	2	2	2	2	2	2	2	2	2

Source: Competitive matches
A = Away; H = Home; W = Win; D = Draw; L = Loss; = Leader, 1997–98 UEFA Champions League Group stage; = 1997–98 UEFA Champions League Qualifying round; = 1997–98 UEFA Cup First round; = 1996–97 La Liga#Relegation playoff; = 1997–98 Segunda División; R = 1997–98 UEFA Cup Winners' Cup

==== Matches ====
1 September 1996 1	Oviedo	2–4	FC Barcelona	Oviedo
	Oli 66'; Barjuán 87' (o.g.)	Report	47' Stoichkov; 50' Stoichkov; 76'Luis Enrique; 89'Luis Enrique	Stadium: Carlos Tartiere; Attendance: 21,000; Referee: Barrenechea Montero

7 September 1996 2	FC Barcelona	2–1	RCD Espanyol	Barcelona
	Giovanni 83'; Pizzi 89'	Report	69' Lardín	Stadium: Camp Nou; Attendance: 90,000; Referee: Megia Davila

15 September 1996 3	Racing	1–1	FC Barcelona	Santander
	Correa 75'	Report	30' Ronaldo	Stadium: Estadio El Sardinero; Attendance: 21,000; Referee: Esquinas Torres

22 September 1996 4	FC Barcelona	3–2	Real Sociedad	Barcelona
	Ronaldo 1'; Pizzi 74'; Ronaldo 88'	Report	57' Albístegui; 89' (pen.)Kovačević	Stadium: Camp Nou; Attendance: 80,000

29 September 1996 5	Real Zaragoza	3–5	FC Barcelona	Zaragoza
	Poyet 10'; Enrique 36' (o.g.); López 46'	Report	21' Figo; 53' Ronaldo; 72' (pen.) Popescu; 81' Luis Enrique; 85'Ronaldo	Stadium: La Romareda; Attendance: 34,000; Referee: Mejuto Gonzalez

2 October 1996 6	FC Barcelona	1–1	Tenerife	Barcelona
	Popescu 78'	Report	81' Juanele	Stadium: Camp Nou; Attendance: 60,000; Referee: Ansuategui Roca

12 October 1996 7	SD Compostela	1–5	FC Barcelona	Santiago de Compostela
	Ohen 73'	Report	1' (o.g.) William; 16' Giovanni; 36' Ronaldo; 46' Ronaldo; 64' Figo	Stadium: San Lázaro; Attendance: 15,000; Referee: Esquinas Torres

20 October 1996 8	FC Barcelona	8–0	CD Logroñés	Barcelona
	Stoichkov 22'; Giovanni 29'; Ronaldo 40'; Giovanni 42'; Stoichkov 55' (pen.); Clotet 77' (o.g.); Pizzi 82'; Ronaldo 87' (pen.)	Report		Stadium: Camp Nou; Attendance: 90,000; Referee: Brito Arceo

23 October 1996 9	Sevilla FC	0–1	FC Barcelona	Sevilla
		Report	77' Luis Enrique	Stadium: Sánchez Pizjuán; Attendance: 60,000

26 October 1996 10	FC Barcelona	3–2	Valencia	Barcelona
	Ronaldo 15'; Ronaldo 35'; Ronaldo 74'	Report	52' Ferreira; 58' Karpin	Stadium: Camp Nou; Attendance: 90,000; Referee: Japon Sevilla

4 November 1996 11	Sporting de Gijón	0–0	FC Barcelona	Gijón
		Report		Stadium: El Molinón; Attendance: 15,000; Referee: Andradas Asurmendi

9 November 1996 12	FC Barcelona	3–3	Atlético Madrid	Barcelona
	Pizzi 15'; Luis Enrique 29'; Giovanni 78'	Report	6' Caminero; 61'Vizcaíno; 73' (pen.) Esnáider	Stadium: Camp Nou; Attendance: 95,000; Referee: Dauden Ibañez

18 November 1996 13	FC Barcelona	6–1	Real Valladolid	Barcelona
	Popescu 10'; Ronaldo 30'; Luis Enrique 36'; Bakero 55'; Figo 75'; Roger 81'	Report	Peternac 58'	Stadium: Camp Nou; Attendance: 80,000; Referee: Nuñez Manrique

23 November 1996 14	Athletic de Bilbao	2–1	FC Barcelona	Bilbao
	Jose Mari 62' (yellow card); Guerrero 76'; Korino (yellow card); Alkiza (yellow card)	Report	25' Abelardo; (yellow card) Sergi Barjuan; (yellow card) Guardiola; (yellow card) Couto	Stadium: San Mamés; Referee: Hernanz Angulo

2 December 1996 15	FC Barcelona	3–0	CF Extremadura	Barcelona
	Giovanni 13'; Popescu 40'; Juanito 44' (o.g.)	Report		Stadium: Camp Nou; Attendance: 70,000; Referee: Lopez de la Fuente

7 December 1996 16	Real Madrid	2–0	FC Barcelona	Madrid
	Šuker 24'; Mijatović 48'	Report		Stadium: Estadio Santiago Bernabéu; Attendance: 106,000; Referee: Juan Manuel Brito Arcero

22 December 1996 17	FC Barcelona	1–0	RC Celta	Barcelona
	Nadal 42'	Report		Stadium: Camp Nou; Attendance: 80,000

4 January 1997 18	Deportivo La Coruña	0–1	FC Barcelona	La Coruña
		Report	88' Pizzi	Stadium: Riazor; Attendance: 35,000

13 January 1997 19	FC Barcelona	2–3	Hércules CF	Barcelona
	Luis Enrique 8'; Ronaldo 15'	Report	32' Pavličić; 42'Višnjić; 55'Rodríguez	Stadium: Camp Nou; Attendance: 75,000; Referee: Losantos Omar

19 January 1997 20	Real Betis	2–4	FC Barcelona	Sevilla
	Jarni 29'; Sergi Barjuán 30' (o.g.)	Report	44' Luis Enrique; 62'Luis Enrique; 73'Ronaldo; 80'Luis Enrique	Stadium: Benito Villamarin; Attendance: 45,000; Referee: Puentes Leiria

26 January 1997 21	FC Barcelona	6–0	Rayo Vallecano	Barcelona
	Luis Enrique 13'; Sergi Barjuán 19'; Contreras 22' (o.g.); Ronaldo 34'; Ronaldo 44' (pen.); Pizzi 74'	Report		Stadium: Camp Nou; Attendance: 80,000; Referee: Carmona Mendez

2 February 1997 22	FC Barcelona	2–2	Real Oviedo	Barcelona
	Pizzi 60'; Ronaldo 67'	Report	75' Oli; 89' Oli	Stadium: Camp Nou; Attendance: 85,000

9 February 1997 23	RCD Espanyol	2–0	FC Barcelona	Barcelona
	Răducioiu 14' (pen.); Răducioiu 50' (pen.)	Report		Stadium: Sarrià; Attendance: 30,000

16 February 1997 24	FC Barcelona	1–0	Racing de Santander	Barcelona
	Luis Enrique 42'	Report		Stadium: Camp Nou; Attendance: 90,000

20 February 1997 25	Real Sociedad	2–0	FC Barcelona	San Sebastián
	de Pedro 41' (pen.) de Pedro 87'	Report		Stadium: Anoeta; Attendance: 29,000

23 February 1997 26	FC Barcelona	4–1	Real Zaragoza	Barcelona
	Abelardo 10'; Ronaldo 40' (pen.); Ronaldo 44'; Ronaldo 72'	Report	81' (pen.) Garitano	Stadium: Camp Nou; Attendance: 90,000

1 March 1997 27	CD Tenerife	4–0	FC Barcelona	Santa Cruz de Tenerife
	Felipe 6'; Jokanović 60' (pen.); Jokanović 73' (pen.); Jokanović 82'; Cesar Gomez (yellow card)	Report	(red card) 36' Nadal; (red card) 59' Abelardo; (yellow card) Guardiola; (yellow card) Luis Enrique	Stadium: Heliodoro Rodríguez López; Attendance: 23,000; Referee: Carmona Mendez

9 March 1997 28	FC Barcelona	3–0	Compostela	Barcelona
	Blanc 5'; Stoichkov 24'; Ronaldo 62'	Report		Stadium: Camp Nou; Attendance: 85,000

16 March 1997 29	CD Logroñés	0–1	FC Barcelona	Logroño
		Report	Amunike 82'	Stadium: Las Gaunas; Attendance: 16,000; Referee: Mejuto Gonzalez

23 March 1997 30	FC Barcelona	4–0	Sevilla CF	Barcelona
	Óscar 56'; Ronaldo 67'; Pizzi 74'; Enrique 79'	Report		Stadium: Camp Nou; Attendance: 80,000

30 March 1997 31	Valencia CF	1–1	FC Barcelona	Valencia
	Machado 40'	Report	Ronaldo 69'	Stadium: Mestalla; Attendance: 45,000

6 April 1997 32	FC Barcelona	4–0	Sporting de Gijón	Barcelona
	Giovanni 13' de la Peña 44'; Ronaldo 61'; Pizzi 89'	Report		Stadium: Camp Nou; Attendance: 90,000

13 April 1997 33	Atlético Madrid	2–5	FC Barcelona	Madrid
	Kiko 13'; Kiko 63'	Report	40' de la Peña; 42'Ronaldo; 58'Ronaldo; 74' (pen.)Ronaldo; 88'Figo	Stadium: Vicente Calderon; Attendance: 52,000; Referee: Dauden Ibañez

16 April 1997 34	Real Valladolid	3–1	FC Barcelona	Valladolid
	Fernando 30'; Víctor 46'; Víctor 77'	Report	5' Ronaldo	Stadium: José Zorrilla; Attendance: 36,000

20 April 1997 35	FC Barcelona	2–0	Athletic de Bilbao	Barcelona
	Abelardo 48'; Ronaldo 64'	Report		Stadium: Camp Nou; Attendance: 65,000; Referee: Puentes Leira

5 May 1997 36	CF Extremadura	1–3	FC Barcelona	Almendralejo
	Silvani 31'	Report	10' Ronaldo; 33' Luis Enrique; Luis Enrique	Stadium: de la Hera; Attendance: 12,000

10 May 1997 37	FC Barcelona	1–0	Real Madrid CF	Barcelona
	Ronaldo 44'	Report		Stadium: Camp Nou; Attendance: 105,000; Referee: Rodriguez Martel

19 May 1997 38	RC Celta de Vigo	1–3	FC Barcelona	Vigo
	Revivo 58'	Report	29' Óscar; 38'Óscar; 64'Ronaldo	Stadium: Balaidos; Attendance: 30,000

24 May 1997 39	FC Barcelona	1–0	Deportivo La Coruña	Barcelona
	Ronaldo 89'	Report		Stadium: Camp Nou; Attendance: 90,000

1 June 1997 40	Hércules CF	2–1	FC Barcelona	Alicante
	Paquito 37'; Pavličić 51'	Report	3' Luis Enrique	Stadium: Estadio José Rico Perez; Attendance: 30,000; Referee: Losantos Omar

15 June 1997 41	FC Barcelona	3–0	Real Betis	Barcelona
	Óscar 43'; Stoichkov 74'; Luis Enrique 82'	Report		Stadium: Camp Nou; Attendance: 70,000

22 June 1997 42	Rayo Vallecano	1–2	FC Barcelona	Madrid
	Klimowicz 44'	Report	8'Stoichkov; 86'Roger	Stadium: Vallecas; Attendance: 12,000; Referee: Fernandez Marin

=== Copa del Rey ===
==== Eightfinals ====
30 January 1997	FC Barcelona	3–2	Real Madrid	Barcelona
21:30	Ronaldo 13'; Nadal 70'; Giovanni 78'; Amunike (yellow card) 25'; Figo (yellow card) 29'; Ronaldo (yellow card) 82'	Report	Šuker 16'; Hierro 67'	Stadium: Camp Nou; Attendance: 95,000; Referee: Lopez Nieto

6 February 1997	Real Madrid	1–1	FC Barcelona	Madrid
21:00	Šuker 79' (pen.)	Report	69' (o.g.) Roberto Carlos; (yellow card) 11' Ferrer; (yellow card) 28' Couto; (yellow card) 46' Popescu; (yellow card) 60' Pizzi; (yellow card) 91' Baia	Stadium: Estadio Santiago Bernabéu; Attendance: 110,000; Referee: Díaz Vega

==== Quarterfinals ====
26 February 1997	Atlético Madrid	2–2	FC Barcelona	Madrid
22:00	Caminero 19'; Kiko 72'		43' (pen.)Pizzi; 64'Pizzi; (yellow card) 22' Figo; (yellow card) 34' Couto	Stadium: Estadio Vicente Calderón; Attendance: 45,000; Referee: Mejuto González

12 March 1997	FC Barcelona	5–4	Atlético Madrid	Barcelona
21:30	Ronaldo 47'; Ronaldo 51'; Figo 67'; Ronaldo 72'; Pizzi 81'; Popescu (yellow card) 19'; Sergi (yellow card); Figo (yellow card)		8' Pantic; 28' Pantic; 31' (pen.)Pantic; 52'Pantic; (yellow card) Prodan	Stadium: Camp Nou; Attendance: 90,000; Referee: Gracia Redondo

==== Semifinals ====
26 March 1997	UD Las Palmas	0–4	FC Barcelona	Las Palmas
22:00			44' (pen.)Ronaldo; 56'Pizzi; 75'de la Peña; 77'Ronaldo; (yellow card) 48' Busquets; (yellow card) 58' Amor; (yellow card) 61' Ferrer	Stadium: Estadio Insular; Attendance: 23,000; Referee: Diaz Vega

3 April 1997	FC Barcelona	3–0	UD Las Palmas	Barcelona
	Óscar 14'; Luis Enrique 28'; Couto 65'			Stadium: Camp Nou; Attendance: 35,000; Referee: Ansuategui Roca

==== Final ====
28 June 1997	FC Barcelona	3–2	Real Betis	Madrid
21:00 MET	Figo 45'; Pizzi 85'; Figo 114'; (yellow card) 54' Ferrer; Figo (yellow card) 41'; De La Peña (yellow card) 72'		Alfonso 11'; Finidi 82'; (yellow card) 77' Jaime; (yellow card) 14' Nadj; (yellow card) 26' Alexis; (yellow card) 89' Finidi George	Stadium: Santiago Bernabéu; Attendance: 82,498; Referee: Ansuategui Roca

=== Supercopa de España ===
25 August 1996	FC Barcelona	5–2	Atlético Madrid	Barcelona
21:30	Ronaldo 5'; Popescu (yellow card) 11'; Giovanni 31'; Figo (yellow card) 34'; Guardiola (yellow card) 35'; Pizzi 74' de la Peña 76'; Luis Enrique (yellow card) 82'; Ronaldo 89'	Report	(yellow card) 7' Simeone; (yellow card) 16' Santi; 37'Esnáider; 57' (pen.)Pantic; (yellow card) 67' Geli; (yellow card) 78' Esnaider; (yellow card) 81' Molina	Stadium: Olímpic; Attendance: 37,500; Referee: Fernandez Marin

28 August 1996	Atlético Madrid	3–1	FC Barcelona	Madrid
22:00	Sergi Barjuan 32' (o.g.); Lopez (yellow card) 42'; Pantic (yellow card) 60'; Esnáider 65'; Bejbl (yellow card) 70'; Pantic 76'	Report	(yellow card) 29' Pizzi; (yellow card) 49' Abelardo; 58' Stoichkov; (yellow card) 78' Sergi	Stadium: La Peineta; Attendance: 15,000; Referee: Ansuategui Roca

=== UEFA Cup Winners' Cup ===
==== First round ====
12 September 1996	FC Barcelona (Spain)	2–0	(Cyprus) AEK Larnaca	Barcelona
21:30	Ronaldo 19'; Figo (yellow card) 70'; Ronaldo 77'	Report	(yellow card) 21' Markou; (yellow card) 86' Kopunovic	Stadium: Estadi Olímpic de Montjuïc; Attendance: 35,000; Referee: (Liechtenstein) Roland Beck

26 September 1996	AEK Larnaca (Cyprus)	0–0	(Spain) FC Barcelona	Larnaca
	Misos (yellow card) 23'	Report	(yellow card) 66' Popescu; (yellow card) 87' Amor	Stadium: GSZ Stadium; Attendance: 6,000; Referee: Claude Colombo (France)

==== Eightfinals ====
17 October 1996	FC Barcelona (Spain)	3–1	(Federal Republic of Yugoslavia) FK Crvena Zvezda	Barcelona
	Giovanni 34'; Giovanni 35'; Figo 54'	Report	Zivkovic 21'	Stadium: Camp Nou; Attendance: 73,000; Referee: (France) Rémi Harrel

31 October 1996	FK Crvena Zvezda (Federal Republic of Yugoslavia)	1–1	(Spain) FC Barcelona	Belgrade
20:30	Jovicic 47'	Report	Giovanni 48'	Stadium: Rajko Mitic Stadium; Attendance: 44,694; Referee: (Austria) Gerd Grabher

==== Quarterfinals ====
6 March 1997	FC Barcelona (Spain)	3–1	(Sweden) AIK	Barcelona
21:00	Popescu 4'; Ronaldo 56'; Pizzi 80'; Blanc (red card) 75'	Report	Simpson 2'	Stadium: Camp Nou; Attendance: 45,000; Referee: (England) David Elleray

20 March 1997	AIK (Sweden)	1–1	(Spain) FC Barcelona	Solna
	Simpson 73'	Report	Ronaldo 12'	Stadium: Rasunda Stadium; Attendance: 35 049; Referee: (France) Gilles Veissière

==== Semifinals ====
10 April 1997	FC Barcelona (Spain)	1–1	(Italy) ACF Fiorentina	Barcelona
21:30	Nadal 43'	Report	Batistuta 63'	Stadium: Camp Nou; Attendance: 105 000; Referee: (Germany) Bernd Heynemann

24 April 1997	ACF Fiorentina (Italy)	0–2	(Spain) FC Barcelona	Florence
20:45		Report	30'Couto; 35' Guardiola; (red card) 82' Nadal	Stadium: Artemio Franchi; Attendance: 43 600; Referee: (Sweden) Anders Frisk

==== Final ====
14 May 1997	FC Barcelona (Spain)	1–0	(France) Paris Saint-Germain	Rotterdam
20:30	Ronaldo 37' (pen.); Couto (yellow card) 16' de la Peña (yellow card) 83'	Report	Fournier (yellow card) 1'; Le Guen (yellow card) 51'; Cauet (yellow card) 82'	Stadium: Feijenoord Stadion; Attendance: 36,802; Referee: (Germany) Markus Merk

=== Friendlies ===
29 July 1996	Sparta Nijkerk	0-4	FC Barcelona

30 July 1996	De Graafschap	1-2	FC Barcelona

1 August 1996	ADO Den Haag	1-0	FC Barcelona

3 August 1996	SC Heerenveen	5-3	FC Barcelona

9 August 1996 Antena 3 Trophy	Atlético Madrid	1-2	FC Barcelona

11 August 1996 ANTENA 3 TROPHY	Real Betis	1-1	FC Barcelona

16 August 1996 CITY OF PALMA TROPHY	RCD Mallorca	1-3	FC Barcelona

18 August 1996 CITY OF PALMA TROPHY	Atlético Madrid	1-0	} FC Barcelona

20 August 1996 Joan Gamper Trophy	FC Barcelona	2-0	San Lorenzo de Almagro
	Giovanni 31'; Pizzi 64'	Report

21 August 1996 Joan Gamper Trophy	FC Barcelona	2-1	Inter
	Guardiola 13'; Pizzi 27'	Report	Ganz 87'

23 August 1996	ŠK Slovan Bratislava	2-1	FC Barcelona

26 November 1996	Celtic F.C.	0-1	FC Barcelona

21 January 1997	Standard Liège	2-2 (4-2 p)	FC Barcelona

28 May 1997 Copa Catalunya	Tarragona	1-3	FC Barcelona

28 May 1997 Copa Catalunya	FC Barcelona	5-0	Mataró

10 June 1997 Copa Catalunya	Europa	3-1	FC Barcelona

== Statistics ==
=== Players statistics ===
No.	Pos	Nat	Player	Total		La Liga		Copa del Rey		UEFA Cup Winners' Cup	
No.	Pos	Nat	Player	Apps	Goals	Apps	Goals	Apps	Goals	Apps	Goals
1	GK	(Portugal) POR	Baia	50	-58	37	-43	5	-11	8	-4
2	DF	(Spain) ESP	Ferrer	28	0	16+2	0	5	0	5	0
20	DF	(Spain) ESP	Nadal	38	2	25+2	1	4+2	0	5	1
15	DF	(France) FRA	Blanc	37	1	25+3	1	4	0	5	0
12	DF	(Spain) ESP	Sergi	47	1	34	1	6	0	7	0
5	DM	(Romania) ROU	Popescu	42	5	26+3	4	4+1	0	8	1
4	DM	(Spain) ESP	Guardiola	51	1	38	0	5+1	0	6+1	1
7	MF	(Portugal) POR	Figo	49	8	34+2	4	5	3	8	1
10	MF	(Brazil) BRA	Giovanni	43	11	24+6	7	1+4	1	6+2	3
21	MF	(Spain) ESP	Luis Enrique	49	18	35	17	6+1	1	7	0
9	FW	(Brazil) BRA	Ronaldo	48	45	37	34	4	6	7	5
13	GK	(Spain) ESP	Busquets	7	-3	4	-2	2	0	1	-1
24	DF	(Portugal) POR	Couto	35	2	23+3	0	5	1	4	1
3	DF	(Spain) ESP	Abelardo	30	3	19+2	3	3	0	5+1	0
23	AM	(Spain) ESP	De la Peña	42	3	17+16	2	3	1	4+2	0
8	FW	(Bulgaria) BUL	Stoichkov	33	7	13+9	7	3+1	0	5+2	0
27	MF	(Spain) ESP	Roger	21	2	12+4	2	1	0	1+3	0
17	MF	(Nigeria) NGR	Amunike	22	1	11+8	1	1+2	0	0	0
18	MF	(Spain) ESP	Amor	35	0	10+16	0	3	0	2+4	0
16	MF	(Spain) ESP	Óscar	18	5	6+8	4	1+3	1	0	0
11	FW	(Spain) ESP	Cuellar	11	0	6+2	0	0+1	0	0+2	0
19	FW	(Argentina) ARG	Pizzi	47	15	5+28	9	5+2	5	2+5	1
26	MF	(Spain) ESP	Celades	6	0	3+1	0	1	0	1	0
6	MF	(Spain) ESP	Bakero	5	1	1+3	1	0	0	0+1	0
28	GK	(Spain) ESP	Arnau	1	-3	1	-3	0	0	0	0
22	MF	(Croatia) CRO	Prosinečki	3	0	0	0	0	0	2+1	0
25	GK	(Spain) ESP	Lopetegui	0	0	0	0	0	0	0	0

== See also ==
- FC Barcelona
- 1996–97 UEFA Cup Winners' Cup
- 1996–97 La Liga
- 1996–97 Copa del Rey
- 1996 Supercopa de España
