= 1996–97 UEFA Champions League group stage =

International football competition

The group stage of the 1996–97 UEFA Champions League began on 11 September 1996 and ended on 4 December 1996. Eight teams qualified automatically for the group stage, while eight more qualified via a preliminary round. The 16 teams were divided into four groups of four, and the teams in each group played against each other on a home-and-away basis, meaning that each team played a total of six group matches. For each win, teams were awarded three points, with one point awarded for each draw. At the end of the group stage, the two teams in each group with the most points advanced to the quarter-finals.

== Groups ==
=== Group A ===
Pos	Team	Pld	W	D	L	GF	GA	GD	Pts	Qualification	AUX	AJX	GRA	RAN
1	(France) Auxerre	6	4	0	2	8	7	+1	12	Advance to knockout stage	—	0–1	1–0	2–1
2	(Netherlands) Ajax	6	4	0	2	8	4	+4	12	Advance to knockout stage	1–2	—	0–1	4–1
3	(Switzerland) Grasshopper	6	3	0	3	8	5	+3	9		3–1	0–1	—	3–0
4	(Scotland) Rangers	6	1	0	5	5	13	−8	3		1–2	0–1	2–1	—

Source: UEFA
11 September 1996
20:30

Auxerre (France)	0–1	(Netherlands) Ajax
	Report	Litmanen 3'

Stade de l'Abbé-Deschamps, Auxerre
Attendance: 18,512
Referee: Piero Ceccarini (Italy)
11 September 1996
20:30

Grasshopper (Switzerland)	3–0	(Scotland) Rangers
Yakin 18'; Türkyilmaz 28', 79'	Report

Hardturm, Zurich
Attendance: 20,030
Referee: José María García-Aranda (Spain)

25 September 1996
19:30

Rangers (Scotland)	1–2	(France) Auxerre
Gascoigne 71'	Report	Deniaud 55', 69'

Ibrox Park, Glasgow
Attendance: 37,344
Referee: Václav Krondl (Czech Republic)
25 September 1996
20:30

Ajax (Netherlands)	0–1	(Switzerland) Grasshopper
	Report	Yakin 60'

Amsterdam Arena, Amsterdam
Attendance: 43,134
Referee: Günter Benkö (Austria)

16 October 1996
20:30

Auxerre (France)	1–0	(Switzerland) Grasshopper
Deniaud 42'	Report

Stade de l'Abbé-Deschamps, Auxerre
Attendance: 17,000
Referee: Rune Pedersen (Norway)
16 October 1996
20:30

Ajax (Netherlands)	4–1	(Scotland) Rangers
Dani 25', 41'; Babangida 83'; Wooter 89'	Report	Durrant 88'

Amsterdam Arena, Amsterdam
Attendance: 48,467
Referee: Hellmut Krug (Germany)

30 October 1996
19:30

Rangers (Scotland)	0–1	(Netherlands) Ajax
	Report	Scholten 38'

Ibrox Park, Glasgow
Attendance: 42,265
Referee: Anders Frisk (Sweden)
30 October 1996
20:30

Grasshopper (Switzerland)	3–1	(France) Auxerre
Moldovan 17', 29' (pen.); Gren 59'	Report	Gren 48' (o.g.)

Hardturm, Zurich
Attendance: 19,200
Referee: Vadzim Zhuk (Belarus)

20 November 1996
19:30

Rangers (Scotland)	2–1	(Switzerland) Grasshopper
McCoist 67' (pen.), 72'	Report	Berger 76'

Ibrox Park, Glasgow
Attendance: 34,192
Referee: László Vágner (Hungary)
20 November 1996
20:30

Ajax (Netherlands)	1–2	(France) Auxerre
Babangida 44'	Report	Diomède 11'; Marlet 56'

Amsterdam Arena, Amsterdam
Attendance: 48,700
Referee: Nikolai Levnikov (Russia)

4 December 1996
20:30

Auxerre (France)	2–1	(Scotland) Rangers
Laslandes 20'; Marlet 32'	Report	Gough 36'

Stade de l'Abbé-Deschamps, Auxerre
Attendance: 21,300
Referee: Kim Milton Nielsen (Denmark)
4 December 1996
20:30

Grasshopper (Switzerland)	0–1	(Netherlands) Ajax
	Report	Kluivert 31'

Hardturm, Zurich
Attendance: 19,200
Referee: Pierluigi Collina (Italy)

=== Group B ===
Pos	Team	Pld	W	D	L	GF	GA	GD	Pts	Qualification	ATM	DOR	WID	STE
1	(Spain) Atlético Madrid	6	4	1	1	12	4	+8	13	Advance to knockout stage	—	0–1	1–0	4–0
2	(Germany) Borussia Dortmund	6	4	1	1	14	8	+6	13	Advance to knockout stage	1–2	—	2–1	5–3
3	(Poland) Widzew Łódź	6	1	1	4	6	10	−4	4		1–4	2–2	—	2–0
4	(Romania) Steaua București	6	1	1	4	5	15	−10	4		1–1	0–3	1–0	—

Source: UEFA
11 September 1996
20:30

Atlético Madrid (Spain)	4–0	(Romania) Steaua București
Esnáider 33', 45'; Simeone 64', 84'	Report

Estadio Vicente Calderón, Madrid
Attendance: 46,000
Referee: Kim Milton Nielsen (Denmark)
11 September 1996
20:30

Borussia Dortmund (Germany)	2–1	(Poland) Widzew Łódź
Herrlich 45', 68'	Report	Citko 84'

Westfalenstadion, Dortmund
Attendance: 39,600
Referee: Robert Ihring (Slovakia)

25 September 1996
20:30

Widzew Łódź (Poland)	1–4	(Spain) Atlético Madrid
Citko 45'	Report	Pantić 25'; Simeone 32', 58'; Kiko 60'

Widzew Łódź Stadium, Łódź
Attendance: 15,450
Referee: Anders Frisk (Sweden)
25 September 1996
21:30

Steaua București (Romania)	0–3	(Germany) Borussia Dortmund
	Report	Ricken 6'; Heinrich 37'; Chapuisat 77'

Stadionul Steaua, Bucharest
Attendance: 15,000
Referee: Paul Durkin (England)

16 October 1996
20:30

Atlético Madrid (Spain)	0–1	(Germany) Borussia Dortmund
	Report	Reuter 51'

Estadio Vicente Calderón, Madrid
Attendance: 50,000
Referee: Michel Piraux (Belgium)
16 October 1996
21:30

Steaua București (Romania)	1–0	(Poland) Widzew Łódź
Bogusz 82' (o.g.)	Report

Stadionul Steaua, Bucharest
Attendance: 10,000
Referee: Giorgos Bikas (Greece)

30 October 1996
20:30

Widzew Łódź (Poland)	2–0	(Romania) Steaua București
Majak 40'; Czerwiec 48'	Report

Widzew Łódź Stadium, Łódź
Attendance: 4,900
Referee: Graziano Cesari (Italy)
30 October 1996
20:30

Borussia Dortmund (Germany)	1–2	(Spain) Atlético Madrid
Herrlich 17'	Report	Roberto 37'; Pantić 42'

Westfalenstadion, Dortmund
Attendance: 45,000
Referee: László Vágner (Hungary)

20 November 1996
20:30

Widzew Łódź (Poland)	2–2	(Germany) Borussia Dortmund
Dembiński 15', 20'	Report	Lambert 14'; Kohler 65'

Widzew Łódź Stadium, Łódź
Attendance: 18,000
Referee: Rune Pedersen (Norway)
20 November 1996
21:30

Steaua București (Romania)	1–1	(Spain) Atlético Madrid
S. Ilie 46'	Report	Pantić 24'

Stadionul Steaua, Bucharest
Attendance: 18,000
Referee: Urs Meier (Switzerland)

4 December 1996
20:30

Atlético Madrid (Spain)	1–0	(Poland) Widzew Łódź
Pantić 83'	Report

Estadio Vicente Calderón, Madrid
Attendance: 23,000
Referee: Václav Krondl (Czech Republic)
4 December 1996
20:30

Borussia Dortmund (Germany)	5–3	(Romania) Steaua București
Chapuisat 13', 22'; Tretschok 43'; Riedle 63'; Zorc 65'	Report	S. Ilie 17' (pen.); Baciu 52'; Călin 79'

Westfalenstadion, Dortmund
Attendance: 37,000
Referee: Hugh Dallas (Scotland)

=== Group C ===
Pos	Team	Pld	W	D	L	GF	GA	GD	Pts	Qualification	JUV	MUN	FEN	RWI
1	(Italy) Juventus	6	5	1	0	11	1	+10	16	Advance to knockout stage	—	1–0	2–0	5–0
2	(England) Manchester United	6	3	0	3	6	3	+3	9	Advance to knockout stage	0–1	—	0–1	2–0
3	(Turkey) Fenerbahçe	6	2	1	3	3	6	−3	7		0–1	0–2	—	1–0
4	(Austria) Rapid Wien	6	0	2	4	2	12	−10	2		1–1	0–2	1–1	—

Source: UEFA
11 September 1996
20:30

Rapid Wien (Austria)	1–1	(Turkey) Fenerbahçe
Stumpf 70'	Report	Bolić 31'

Ernst-Happel-Stadion, Vienna
Attendance: 41,500
Referee: Michel Piraux (Belgium)
11 September 1996
20:30

Juventus (Italy)	1–0	(England) Manchester United
Bokšić 33'	Report

Stadio delle Alpi, Turin
Attendance: 50,000
Referee: Markus Merk (Germany)

25 September 1996
21:30

Fenerbahçe (Turkey)	0–1	(Italy) Juventus
	Report	Bokšić 22'

Şükrü Saracoğlu Stadium, Istanbul
Attendance: 29,000
Referee: Serge Muhmenthaler (Switzerland)
25 September 1996
19:30

Manchester United (England)	2–0	(Austria) Rapid Wien
Solskjær 20'; Beckham 27'	Report

Old Trafford, Manchester
Attendance: 51,831
Referee: Rémi Harrel (France)

16 October 1996
20:30

Rapid Wien (Austria)	1–1	(Italy) Juventus
Lesiak 20'	Report	C. Vieri 9'

Ernst-Happel-Stadion, Vienna
Attendance: 46,500
Referee: Kim Milton Nielsen (Denmark)
16 October 1996
21:30

Fenerbahçe (Turkey)	0–2	(England) Manchester United
	Report	Beckham 55'; Cantona 60'

Şükrü Saracoğlu Stadium, Istanbul
Attendance: 26,000
Referee: Manuel Díaz Vega (Spain)

30 October 1996
20:30

Juventus (Italy)	5–0	(Austria) Rapid Wien
Bokšić 5', 59'; Montero 27'; Del Piero 29', 75'	Report

Stadio delle Alpi, Turin
Attendance: 26,143
Referee: Hugh Dallas (Scotland)
30 October 1996
19:30

Manchester United (England)	0–1	(Turkey) Fenerbahçe
	Report	Bolić 78'

Old Trafford, Manchester
Attendance: 53,297
Referee: Mario van der Ende (Netherlands)

20 November 1996
19:30

Manchester United (England)	0–1	(Italy) Juventus
	Report	Del Piero 37' (pen.)

Old Trafford, Manchester
Attendance: 53,529
Referee: José María García-Aranda (Spain)
20 November 1996
21:30

Fenerbahçe (Turkey)	1–0	(Austria) Rapid Wien
Høgh 78'	Report

Şükrü Saracoğlu Stadium, Istanbul
Attendance: 25,000
Referee: Sándor Puhl (Hungary)

4 December 1996
20:30

Juventus (Italy)	2–0	(Turkey) Fenerbahçe
Padovano 41'; Amoruso 84'	Report

Stadio delle Alpi, Turin
Attendance: 12,900
Referee: Bernd Heynemann (Germany)
4 December 1996
20:30

Rapid Wien (Austria)	0–2	(England) Manchester United
	Report	Giggs 24'; Cantona 72'

Ernst-Happel-Stadion, Vienna
Attendance: 45,000
Referee: Leif Sundell (Sweden)

=== Group D ===
Pos	Team	Pld	W	D	L	GF	GA	GD	Pts	Qualification	POR	ROS	MIL	GOT
1	(Portugal) Porto	6	5	1	0	12	4	+8	16	Advance to knockout stage	—	3–0	1–1	2–1
2	(Norway) Rosenborg	6	3	0	3	7	11	−4	9	Advance to knockout stage	0–1	—	1–4	1–0
3	(Italy) Milan	6	2	1	3	13	11	+2	7		2–3	1–2	—	4–2
4	(Sweden) IFK Göteborg	6	1	0	5	7	13	−6	3		0–2	2–3	2–1	—

Source: UEFA
11 September 1996
20:30

IFK Göteborg (Sweden)	2–3	(Norway) Rosenborg
Erlingmark 38', 49'	Report	Jakobsen 32'; Iversen 52'; Brattbakk 64'

Ullevi, Gothenburg
Attendance: 23,682
Referee: Atanas Uzunov (Bulgaria)
11 September 1996
20:30

Milan (Italy)	2–3	(Portugal) Porto
Simone 14'; Weah 69'	Report	Artur 52'; Jardel 75', 83'

San Siro, Milan
Attendance: 31,769
Referee: Mario van der Ende (Netherlands)

25 September 1996
19:30

Porto (Portugal)	2–1	(Sweden) IFK Göteborg
Artur 27', 51'	Report	Jorge Costa 71' (o.g.)

Estádio das Antas, Porto
Attendance: 30,000
Referee: Ahmet Çakar (Turkey)
25 September 1996
20:30

Rosenborg (Norway)	1–4	(Italy) Milan
Soltvedt 16'	Report	Simone 6', 23', 25'; Weah 56'

Lerkendal Stadion, Trondheim
Attendance: 20,849
Referee: David Elleray (England)

16 October 1996
20:30

IFK Göteborg (Sweden)	2–1	(Italy) Milan
Wahlstedt 75'; Alexandersson 85'	Report	Weah 52'

Ullevi, Gothenburg
Attendance: 42,450
Referee: Ryszard Wójcik (Poland)
16 October 1996
20:30

Rosenborg (Norway)	0–1	(Portugal) Porto
	Report	Jardel 90'

Lerkendal Stadion, Trondheim
Attendance: 20,412
Referee: Charles Agius (Malta)

30 October 1996
19:30

Porto (Portugal)	3–0	(Norway) Rosenborg
Zahovič 32'; Drulović 41'; Artur 60'	Report

Estádio das Antas, Porto
Attendance: 15,000
Referee: Bernd Heynemann (Germany)
30 October 1996
20:30

Milan (Italy)	4–2	(Sweden) IFK Göteborg
Boban 4'; Albertini 14' (pen.); Locatelli 44'; Baggio 90'	Report	Blomqvist 27'; A. Andersson 32'

San Siro, Milan
Attendance: 29,803
Referee: Marc Batta (France)

20 November 1996
19:30

Porto (Portugal)	1–1	(Italy) Milan
Edmílson 71'	Report	Davids 56'

Estádio das Antas, Porto
Attendance: 50,000
Referee: Gerd Grabher (Austria)
20 November 1996
20:30

Rosenborg (Norway)	1–0	(Sweden) IFK Göteborg
Skammelsrud 66' (pen.)	Report

Lerkendal Stadion, Trondheim
Attendance: 19,849
Referee: Éric Blareau (Belgium)

4 December 1996
20:30

IFK Göteborg (Sweden)	0–2	(Portugal) Porto
	Report	Jardel 64'; Edmílson 89'

Ullevi, Gothenburg
Attendance: 19,448
Referee: Dick Jol (Netherlands)
4 December 1996
20:30

Milan (Italy)	1–2	(Norway) Rosenborg
Dugarry 45'	Report	Brattbakk 29'; Heggem 70'

San Siro, Milan
Attendance: 28,965
Referee: Giorgos Bikas (Greece)
