= 1996–97 UEFA Champions League knockout stage =

International football competition

The knockout stage of the 1996–97 UEFA Champions League began on 5 March 1997 and ended with the final at the Olympiastadion in Munich on 28 May 1997. The top two teams from each of the four groups in the group stage competed in the knockout stage. The draw for the quarter-finals was performed before the start of the group stage, with the winners of each group played against the runners-up from another; Group A vs. Group B, and Group C vs. Group D, with the group winner hosting the second leg. For the semi-finals, the winners of each tie between teams from groups A and B played against the winners of the corresponding tie between teams from groups C and D.

== Qualified teams ==
The knockout stage involved the eight teams which qualified as winners and runners-up of all four groups in the group stage.

Group	Winners (seeded in quarter-final draw)	Runners-up (unseeded in quarter-final draw)
A	(France) Auxerre	(Netherlands) Ajax
B	(Spain) Atlético Madrid	(Germany) Borussia Dortmund
C	(Italy) Juventus	(England) Manchester United
D	(Portugal) Porto	(Norway) Rosenborg

== Format ==
Each quarter-final and semi-final was played over two legs, with each team playing one leg at home; the team that scored the most goals over the two legs qualified for the following round. In the event that the two teams scored the same number of goals over the two legs, the team that scored more goals away from home qualified for the next round; if both teams scored the same number of away goals, matches would go to golden goal extra time and then a penalty shoot-out if the teams could not be separated after extra time.

== Bracket ==
Quarter-finals
(Germany) Borussia Dortmund	3	1	4
(France) Auxerre	1	0	1
(England) Manchester United	4	0	4
(Portugal) Porto	0	0	0
(Netherlands) Ajax (a.e.t.)	1	3	4
(Spain) Atlético Madrid	1	2	3
(Norway) Rosenborg	1	0	1
(Italy) Juventus	1	2	3

Semi-finals
(Germany) Borussia Dortmund	1	1	2
(England) Manchester United	0	0	0
(Netherlands) Ajax	1	1	2
(Italy) Juventus	2	4	6

Final
28 May – Munich
(Germany) Borussia Dortmund	3
(Italy) Juventus	1

== Quarter-finals ==
=== Summary ===
Team 1	Agg.	Team 2	1st leg	2nd leg
Borussia Dortmund (Germany)	4–1	(France) Auxerre	3–1	1–0
Manchester United (England)	4–0	(Portugal) Porto	4–0	0–0
Ajax (Netherlands)	4–3	(Spain) Atlético Madrid	1–1	3–2 (a.e.t.)
Rosenborg (Norway)	1–3	(Italy) Juventus	1–1	0–2

=== Matches ===
5 March 1997
20:30

Borussia Dortmund (Germany)	3–1	(France) Auxerre
Riedle 12'; Schneider 54'; Möller 83'	Report	Lamouchi 75'

Westfalenstadion, Dortmund
Attendance: 47,500
Referee: José María García-Aranda (Spain)
19 March 1997
20:30

Auxerre (France)	0–1	(Germany) Borussia Dortmund
	Report	Ricken 61'

Stade de l'Abbé-Deschamps, Auxerre
Attendance: 21,000
Referee: Günter Benkö (Austria)

Borussia Dortmund won 4–1 on aggregate.

5 March 1997
19:30

Manchester United (England)	4–0	(Portugal) Porto
May 22'; Cantona 34'; Giggs 61'; Cole 80'	Report

Old Trafford, Manchester
Attendance: 53,415
Referee: Anders Frisk (Sweden)
19 March 1997
19:30

Porto (Portugal)	0–0	(England) Manchester United
	Report

Estádio das Antas, Porto
Attendance: 38,000
Referee: Kim Milton Nielsen (Denmark)

Manchester United won 4–0 on aggregate.

5 March 1997
20:30

Ajax (Netherlands)	1–1	(Spain) Atlético Madrid
Kluivert 53'	Report	Esnáider 8'

Amsterdam Arena, Amsterdam
Attendance: 51,000
Referee: Markus Merk (Germany)
19 March 1997
20:30

Atlético Madrid (Spain)	2–3 (a.e.t.)	(Netherlands) Ajax
Kiko 29'; Pantić 105' (pen.)	Report	R. de Boer 49'; Dani 100'; Babangida 119'

Estadio Vicente Calderón, Madrid
Attendance: 50,018
Referee: Serge Muhmenthaler (Switzerland)

Ajax won 4–3 on aggregate.

5 March 1997
20:30

Rosenborg (Norway)	1–1	(Italy) Juventus
Soltvedt 51'	Report	C. Vieri 52'

Lerkendal Stadion, Trondheim
Attendance: 20,246
Referee: Marc Batta (France)
19 March 1997
20:30

Juventus (Italy)	2–0	(Norway) Rosenborg
Zidane 29'; Amoruso 90' (pen.)	Report

Stadio delle Alpi, Turin
Attendance: 35,371
Referee: Vítor Melo Pereira (Portugal)

Juventus won 3–1 on aggregate.

== Semi-finals ==
=== Summary ===
Team 1	Agg.	Team 2	1st leg	2nd leg
Borussia Dortmund (Germany)	2–0	(England) Manchester United	1–0	1–0
Ajax (Netherlands)	2–6	(Italy) Juventus	1–2	1–4

=== Matches ===
9 April 1997
20:30

Borussia Dortmund (Germany)	1–0	(England) Manchester United
Tretschok 76'	Report

Westfalenstadion, Dortmund
Attendance: 48,500
Referee: Nikolai Levnikov (Russia)
23 April 1997
19:30

Manchester United (England)	0–1	(Germany) Borussia Dortmund
	Report	Ricken 8'

Old Trafford, Manchester
Attendance: 53,606
Referee: Urs Meier (Switzerland)

Borussia Dortmund won 2–0 on aggregate.

9 April 1997
20:30

Ajax (Netherlands)	1–2	(Italy) Juventus
Litmanen 66'	Report	Amoruso 14'; C. Vieri 41'

Amsterdam Arena, Amsterdam
Attendance: 51,200
Referee: Antonio López Nieto (Spain)
23 April 1997
20:30

Juventus (Italy)	4–1	(Netherlands) Ajax
Lombardo 34'; C. Vieri 36'; Amoruso 79'; Zidane 80'	Report	Melchiot 75'

Stadio delle Alpi, Turin
Attendance: 62,377
Referee: Kim Milton Nielsen (Denmark)

Juventus won 6–2 on aggregate.

== Final ==
The final was played on 28 May 1997 at the Olympiastadion in Munich, Germany.

28 May 1997
20:30

Borussia Dortmund (Germany)	3–1	(Italy) Juventus
Riedle 29', 34'; Ricken 71'	Report	Del Piero 65'

Olympiastadion, Munich
Attendance: 59,000
Referee: Sándor Puhl (Hungary)
