= 1996 Supercopa de España =

Barcelona	Atlético Madrid
6	5
- on aggregate

First leg
Barcelona	Atlético Madrid
5	2
- Date: 25 August 1996
- Venue: Estadi Olímpic de Montjuïc, Barcelona
- Referee: Juan Antonio Fernandez Marín
- Attendance: 37,500

Second leg
Atlético Madrid	Barcelona
3	1
- Date: 28 August 1996
- Venue: Estadio Olímpico de Madrid, Madrid
- Referee: Juan Ansuátegui Roca
- Attendance: 15,000

The 1996 Supercopa de España was a two-leg Spanish football match played on 25 August and 28 August 1996. It was contested by Barcelona, who were Spanish Cup runners-up in 1995–96, and Atlético Madrid, who won the 1995–96 Spanish League and the 1995–96 Spanish Cup. Barcelona won 6–5 on aggregate.

== Match details ==
=== First leg ===
25 August 1996
21:30 CET

Barcelona	5–2	Atlético Madrid
Ronaldo 5', 89'; Giovanni 31'; Pizzi 74'; De la Peña 76'		Esnáider 37'; Pantić 57' (pen.)

Estadi Olímpic de Montjuïc, Barcelona
Attendance: 37,500
Referee: Fernández Marín

Barcelona	Atletico Madrid

GK	1	(Portugal) Vítor Baía
RB	20	(Spain) Miguel Ángel Nadal		(substituted off) 50'
CB	5	(Romania) Gheorghe Popescu (c)	(yellow card) 11'
LB	12	(Spain) Sergi
DM	4	(Spain) Pep Guardiola	(yellow card) 35'
CM	21	(Spain) Luis Enrique	(yellow card) 82'
CM	18	(Spain) Guillermo Amor		(substituted off) 67'
AM	10	(Brazil) Giovanni
RW	7	(Portugal) Luís Figo	(yellow card) 34'
CF	9	(Brazil) Ronaldo
LW	8	(Bulgaria) Hristo Stoichkov		(substituted off) 73'
Substitutes:
DF	3	(Spain) Abelardo		(substituted in) 50'
MF	23	(Spain) Iván de la Peña		(substituted in) 67'
FW	19	(Spain) Juan Antonio Pizzi		(substituted in) 73'
Manager:
(England) Bobby Robson

GK	1	(Spain) José Molina	(yellow card) 81'
RB	20	(Spain) Delfí Geli	(yellow card) 67'
CB	6	(Spain) Santi	(yellow card) 16'
CB	4	(Spain) Roberto Solozábal (c)
LB	3	(Spain) Toni
DM	24	(Czech Republic) Radek Bejbl
DM	14	(Argentina) Diego Simeone	(yellow card) 7'	(substituted off) 46'
AM	10	(Federal Republic of Yugoslavia) Milinko Pantić
AM	18	(Spain) Roberto		(substituted off) 46'
CF	9	(Argentina) Juan Esnáider	(yellow card) 78'
CF	19	(Spain) Kiko
Substitutes:
MF	8	(Spain) Juan Vizcaíno	(yellow card) 60'	(substituted in) 46'
MF	15	(Spain) Carlos Aguilera		(substituted in) 46' (substituted off) 67'
DF	5	(Spain) Juanma López		(substituted in) 67'
Manager:
(Federal Republic of Yugoslavia) Radomir Antić

=== Second leg ===
28 August 1996
22:00 CET

Atlético Madrid	3–1	Barcelona
Sergi 32' (o.g.); Esnáider 65'; Pantić 76'		Stoichkov 58'

Estadio Olímpico de Madrid, Madrid
Attendance: 15,000
Referee: Ansuátegui Roca

Atletico Madrid	Barcelona

GK	1	(Spain) José Molina
RB	5	(Spain) Juanma López	(yellow card) 42'
CB	6	(Spain) Santi
CB	2	(Spain) Pablo Alfaro
LB	3	(Spain) Toni (c)
DM	24	(Czech Republic) Radek Bejbl	(yellow card) 70'	(substituted off) 71'
DM	14	(Argentina) Diego Simeone		(substituted off) 65'
AM	10	(Federal Republic of Yugoslavia) Milinko Pantić	(yellow card) 60'
AM	18	(Spain) Roberto
CF	7	(Argentina) Leonardo Biagini		(substituted off) 25'
CF	19	(Spain) Kiko
Substitutes:
FW	9	(Argentina) Juan Esnáider	(yellow card) 30'	(substituted in) 25'
DF	20	(Spain) Delfí Geli		(substituted in) 65'
MF	8	(Spain) Juan Vizcaíno		(substituted in) 71'
Manager:
(Federal Republic of Yugoslavia) Radomir Antić

GK	25	(Spain) Julen Lopetegui
RB	2	(Spain) Albert Ferrer
CB	3	(Spain) Abelardo	(yellow card) 49'
CB	5	(Romania) Gheorghe Popescu (c)
CB	15	(France) Laurent Blanc
LB	12	(Spain) Sergi	(yellow card) 78'
RM	21	(Spain) Luis Enrique
CM	4	(Spain) Pep Guardiola
LM	18	(Spain) Guillermo Amor		(substituted off) 90+2'
CF	19	(Spain) Juan Antonio Pizzi	(yellow card) 29'
CF	8	(Bulgaria) Hristo Stoichkov		(substituted off) 80'
Substitutes:
FW	11	(Spain) Ángel Cuéllar		(substituted in) 80'
MF	6	(Spain) José Mari Bakero		(substituted in) 90+2'
Manager:
(England) Bobby Robson

== See also ==
- 1996–97 La Liga
- 1996–97 Copa del Rey
- 1996–97 Atlético Madrid season
- 1996–97 FC Barcelona season
