= 1997 UEFA Champions League final =

Association football match

- Match programme cover
- Event: 1996–97 UEFA Champions League
Borussia Dortmund	Juventus
(Germany)	(Italy)
3	1
- Date: 28 May 1997
- Venue: Olympiastadion, Munich
- Referee: Sándor Puhl (Hungary)
- Attendance: 59,000

The 1997 UEFA Champions League final was a football match played at the Olympiastadion in Munich on 28 May 1997 to determine the winner of the 1996–97 UEFA Champions League. The match was contested by Borussia Dortmund of Germany and defending champions Juventus of Italy. Borussia Dortmund won 3–1 with goals from Karl-Heinz Riedle and Lars Ricken; Juventus' only goal was scored by Alessandro Del Piero. This was the third from three consecutive finals featuring the defending champions, all of whom lost to their opponents.

== Route to the final ==
In their first semi-final in Europe's premier tournament since 1964, Dortmund defeated Manchester United, who themselves had not reached that stage since 1969.

In the other half of the draw, Juventus easily overcame Ajax, the same team they had beaten on penalties in the previous year's final.

(Germany) Borussia Dortmund				Round	(Italy) Juventus			
Opponent	Result			Group stage	Opponent	Result		
(Poland) Widzew Łódź	2–1 (H)			Matchday 1	(England) Manchester United	1–0 (H)		
(Romania) Steaua București	3–0 (A)			Matchday 2	(Turkey) Fenerbahçe	1–0 (A)		
(Spain) Atlético Madrid	1–0 (A)			Matchday 3	(Austria) Rapid Wien	1–1 (A)		
(Spain) Atlético Madrid	1–2 (H)			Matchday 4	(Austria) Rapid Wien	5–0 (H)		
(Poland) Widzew Łódź	2–2 (A)			Matchday 5	(England) Manchester United	1–0 (A)		
(Romania) Steaua București	5–3 (H)			Matchday 6	(Turkey) Fenerbahçe	2–0 (H)		
Group B runners-up: Pos / Team / Pld / Pts; 1 / (Spain) Atlético Madrid / 6 / 13; 2 / (Germany) Borussia Dortmund / 6 / 13; 3 / (Poland) Widzew Łódź / 6 / 4; 4 / (Romania) Steaua București / 6 / 4; Source: UEFA				Final standings	Group C winner: Pos / Team / Pld / Pts; 1 / (Italy) Juventus / 6 / 16; 2 / (England) Manchester United / 6 / 9; 3 / (Turkey) Fenerbahçe / 6 / 7; 4 / (Austria) Rapid Wien / 6 / 2; Source: UEFA			
Opponent	Agg.	1st leg	2nd leg	Knockout phase	Opponent	Agg.	1st leg	2nd leg
(France) Auxerre	4–1	3–1 (H)	1–0 (A)	Quarter-finals	(Norway) Rosenborg	3–1	1–1 (A)	2–0 (H)
(England) Manchester United	2–0	1–0 (H)	1–0 (A)	Semi-finals	(Netherlands) Ajax	6–2	2–1 (A)	4–1 (H)

=== Previous meetings ===
The match featured the same teams that competed in the 1993 UEFA Cup final, in which Juventus prevailed 6–1 over two legs. Their two German players in that final, Jürgen Kohler and Andreas Möller, had since moved to Dortmund along with the Brazilian Júlio César (who did not feature in the 1997 final), while another two Dortmund players who did play in Munich – Stefan Reuter and Paulo Sousa – were also former Juventus players, and Matthias Sammer and Karl-Heinz Riedle had previously played in Italy's Serie A (the latter's replacement at Lazio was Alen Bokšić, who by 1997 had moved to Juventus).

Goalkeepers Angelo Peruzzi and his understudy Michelangelo Rampulla were the only Juventus players from 1993 in the squad for the 1997 final (Moreno Torricelli and Antonio Conte were still at the club but were not involved), with the aforementioned Kohler and Möller having switched sides. In the Dortmund squad their goalkeeper Stefan Klos, striker Stéphane Chapuisat and midfielders René Tretschok, Reuter and club captain Michael Zorc remained from four years earlier.

Besides the 1993 showpiece, the clubs had also met in the semi-finals of the 1994–95 UEFA Cup with Juventus progressing to the final which they lost to Parma, and in the group stage of the 1995–96 UEFA Champions League, with each club winning away from home, however Juventus topped the group and went on to win the trophy.

In the years to follow, Juventus and Borussia Dortmund would not meet again until 2014–15 Champions League round of 16 – the Italian club went through, meaning they won all four fixtures (1993, 1995 UEFA Cup, 1995 and 2015 Champions League) at Dortmund's Westfalenstadion, with their only defeat on German soil having been in this final. Juventus reached that season's final; coincidentally that match was again held at an Olympiastadion in Germany, but this time in Berlin, and the outcome was another 3–1 loss, to Barcelona.

== Match ==
=== Summary ===
In the 29th minute, Karl-Heinz Riedle put Dortmund ahead finishing with a low shot from inside the six yard box after Paul Lambert's cross from the right. Five minutes later, Riedle made it 2–0 with a header from a Andreas Möller corner kick from the left. Christian Vieri later had a goal disallowed for Juventus by referee Sándor Puhl for an apparent hand-ball.

In the second half, Juventus forward Alessandro Del Piero, who had come on as a substitute, scored via a back-heel after a cross from the left by Alen Bokšić to make the score 2–1.

In the 71st minute, 20-year-old substitute and Dortmund local boy Lars Ricken latched on to a through-pass by Andreas Möller only 16 seconds after coming onto the pitch. Ricken chipped Angelo Peruzzi in the Juve goal from over 20 yards with his first touch of the ball, to make it 3–1 for Dortmund. Ricken's goal was the fastest ever by a substitute in said event.

With Zinedine Zidane unable to make an impression for Juve against the close marking of Lambert, the 3–1 victory gave Dortmund their first Champions League title.

=== Details ===
28 May 1997
20:30 UTC+2

Borussia Dortmund (Germany)	3–1	(Italy) Juventus
Riedle 29', 34'; Ricken 71'	Report	Del Piero 65'

Olympiastadion, Munich
Attendance: 59,000
Referee: Sándor Puhl (Hungary)

Borussia Dortmund	Juventus

GK	1	(Germany) Stefan Klos
SW	6	(Germany) Matthias Sammer (c)
CB	15	(Germany) Jürgen Kohler
CB	16	(Germany) Martin Kree
RWB	7	(Germany) Stefan Reuter
LWB	17	(Germany) Jörg Heinrich
CM	14	(Scotland) Paul Lambert
CM	19	(Portugal) Paulo Sousa	(yellow card) 23'
AM	10	(Germany) Andreas Möller		(substituted off) 89'
CF	13	(Germany) Karl-Heinz Riedle		(substituted off) 67'
CF	9	(Switzerland) Stéphane Chapuisat		(substituted off) 70'
Substitutes:
GK	12	(Germany) Wolfgang de Beer
MF	8	(Germany) Michael Zorc		(substituted on) 89'
MF	18	(Germany) Lars Ricken	(yellow card) 71'	(substituted on) 70'
MF	23	(Germany) René Tretschok
FW	11	(Germany) Heiko Herrlich		(substituted on) 67'
Manager:
(Germany) Ottmar Hitzfeld

GK	1	(Italy) Angelo Peruzzi (c)
RB	5	(Italy) Sergio Porrini	(yellow card) 19'	(substituted off) 46'
CB	2	(Italy) Ciro Ferrara
CB	4	(Uruguay) Paolo Montero
LB	13	(Italy) Mark Iuliano	(yellow card) 90'
DM	14	(France) Didier Deschamps
RM	7	(Italy) Angelo Di Livio
LM	18	(Federal Republic of Yugoslavia) Vladimir Jugović
AM	21	(France) Zinedine Zidane
CF	15	(Italy) Christian Vieri		(substituted off) 71'
CF	9	(Croatia) Alen Bokšić		(substituted off) 87'
Substitutes:
GK	12	(Italy) Michelangelo Rampulla
DF	22	(Italy) Gianluca Pessotto
MF	20	(Italy) Alessio Tacchinardi		(substituted on) 87'
FW	10	(Italy) Alessandro Del Piero		(substituted on) 46'
FW	16	(Italy) Nicola Amoruso		(substituted on) 71'
Manager:
(Italy) Marcello Lippi

Assistant referees:
László Hamar (Hungary)
Imre Bozóky (Hungary)
Fourth official:
Attila Juhos (Hungary)

Match rules

- 90 minutes.
- 30 minutes of golden goal extra time if necessary.
- Penalty shoot-out if scores still level.
- Five named substitutes.
- Maximum of three substitutions.

== See also ==
- 1993 UEFA Cup final – contested between same teams
- 1997 UEFA Cup Winners' Cup final
- 1997 UEFA Cup final
- 1997 UEFA Super Cup
- 1997 Intercontinental Cup
- 1996–97 Borussia Dortmund season
- 1996–97 Juventus FC season
- Borussia Dortmund in international football
- Juventus FC in international football
