= Ivano Trotta =

Italian footballer and manager

Personal information
- Full name: Ivano Trotta
- Date of birth: 12 December 1977 (age 48)
- Place of birth: Rome, Italy
- Height: 1.77 m (5 ft 9 1/2 in)
- Position: Midfielder

Youth career
- Juventus

Senior career*
Years	Team	Apps	(Gls)
1996–1997	Juventus	1	(0)
1997–1998	Fiorenzuola	6	(0)
1997	Carrarese	21	(1)
1998–1999	Viterbese	29	(6)
1999–2000	Padova	28	(2)
2000–2002	Gualdo	58	(8)
2002–2006	Rimini	116	(13)
2006–2007	Napoli	42	(3)
2007–2008	Treviso	9	(0)
2008–2009	Ravenna	46	(2)
2009–2010	Bellaria Igea Marina	23	(4)

International career
1994	Italy U-16	2	(0)
1995	Italy U-17	7	(2)
1995	Italy U-18	3	(0)
- * Club domestic league appearances and goals

Ivano Trotta (born 12 December 1977 in Rome), is an Italian football manager and former player, who played as a central midfielder.

== Career ==
Trotta began his career with Juventus during the 1996–97 Serie A season, and played for several other Italian clubs in Serie B and Serie C, namely Fiorenzuola, Carrarese, Viterbese, Padova, Gualdo, Rimini, Napoli, Treviso. He later played for Ravenna Calcio in Lega Pro Prima Divisione during the 2008–09 season, and ended his career with Bellaria Igea Marina after the 2009–10 Lega Pro Seconda Divisione season.

== Career statistics ==
=== Club ===
Club performance			League		Cup		Continental		Total	
Season	Club	League	Apps	Goals	Apps	Goals	Apps	Goals	Apps	Goals
Italy			League		Coppa Italia		Europe		Total	
1996–97	Juventus	Serie A	1	0						
1997–98	Fiorenzuola	Serie C1	6	0						
1997–98	Carrarese	Serie C1	21	1						
1998–99	Viterbese	Serie C2	29	6						
1999–2000	Padova	Serie C2	28	2						
2000–01	Gualdo	Serie C2	29	3						
2001–02	Gualdo	Serie C2	29	5						
2002–03	Rimini	Serie C2	31	0						
2003–04	Rimini	Serie C1	32	5						
2004–05	Rimini	Serie C1	34	7						
2005–06	Rimini	Serie B	19	1						
2005–06	Napoli	Serie C1	14	1						
2006–07	Napoli	Serie B	28	2						
2007–08	Treviso	Serie B	9	0						
2007–08	Ravenna Calcio	Serie B	16	1						
2008–09	Ravenna Calcio	Lega Pro Prima Divisione	30	1						
2009–10	Bellaria Igea Marina	Lega Pro Seconda Divisione	23	4						
Country	Italy		379	39						
Total			379	39						
