= René Tretschok =

German footballer

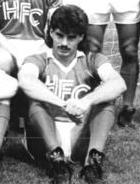
- René Tretschok with Hallescher FC in 1988

Personal information
- Full name: René Tretschok
- Date of birth: 23 December 1968 (age 57)
- Place of birth: Wolfen, East Germany
- Height: 1.78 m (5 ft 10 in)
- Position: Midfielder

Youth career
- 1977–1984: Chemie Wolfen
- 1984–1986: Chemie Halle

Senior career*
Years	Team	Apps	(Gls)
1986–1992	Hallescher FC	118	(10)
1992–1997	Borussia Dortmund	61	(8)
1993–1994	→ Tennis Borussia Berlin (loan)	26	(1)
1997–1998	1. FC Köln	34	(8)
1998–2003	Hertha BSC	82	(7)
2003–2005	Hertha BSC II	19	(2)
2005–2007	SV Babelsberg 03	55	(8)
2008–2009	FC Grün-Weiß Wolfen	4	(0)
Total		399	(44)

Managerial career
- 2005–2012: Hertha BSC U19
- 2012: Hertha BSC (caretaker)
- * Club domestic league appearances and goals

René Tretschok (born 23 December 1968) is a German former professional footballer who played as a midfielder. As a player of Borussia Dortmund he was part of their Champions League victory in 1997. He scored an important goal in the semi-final of their victorious campaign against Manchester United, giving Dortmund a crucial 1–0 lead going into the second leg. He was then rewarded with a place on the bench in the final, however he remained unused for the entire match.

== Coaching career ==
On 25 June 2009, he was named as the new manager of the Hertha BSC Under-19 squad. After Michael Skibbe was sacked as manager of Hertha on 12 February 2012, Tretschok was appointed caretaker.

== Honours ==
Borussia Dortmund

- Bundesliga: 1994–95, 1995–96
- UEFA Champions League: 1996–97
- DFL-Supercup: 1995

Hertha Berlin

- DFL-Ligapokal: 2001, 2002
