= Thomas Deniaud =

French footballer (born 1971)

Personal information
- Full name: Thomas Deniaud
- Date of birth: 31 August 1971 (age 55)
- Place of birth: Nantes, France
- Height: 1.84 m (6 ft 0 in)
- Position: Striker

Senior career*
Years	Team	Apps	(Gls)
1991–1999	AJ Auxerre	68	(11)
1994–1995	→ Angers SCO (loan)	39	(15)
1995–1996	→ Angers SCO (loan)	20	(6)
1999–2002	Le Havre AC	94	(26)
2002–2004	Clermont Foot	64	(13)
2004–2005	USJA Carquefou	21	(4)
2005–2008	AS Yzeure	80	(27)
2008–2009	RC Vichy		
- * Club domestic league appearances and goals

Thomas Deniaud (born 31 August 1971) is a French former professional footballer who played as a striker.
