= Trofeo Ciudad de Marbella =

Summer tournament organized in Marbella

Ciudad de Marbella Trophy is a summer tournament organized by Atlético Marbella in Marbella. In the beginning there used to be three participating teams, but in the last years it has been a two-team tournament. The first edition was in 1963 and was won by the home team. From 1963 to 1978 the tournament was called the Trofeo Semana del Sol (Sun Week Trophy) of 1979–1992 was called Ciudad de Marbella Trophy, in 1993 and 1994 changed the name FORTA Trophy, Antena 3 Marbella Trophy called in 1995, turning to call Ciudad de Marbella Trophy in the last edition of 1997.

== Titles ==
Note that only the winner and runner-up is shown here. Some years there were more than two participating teams.

Year	Champion	Runners-Up	Result
Trofeo Semana del Sol
1963	(Spain) Atlético Marbella	Triangular Trophy.	
1964	(Spain) AD Ceuta	Triangular Trophy.	
1965–1966	Unknown.		
1967	(Spain) Granada CF	Triangular Trophy.	
1968	(Spain) Atlético Marbella	Triangular Trophy.	
1969	(Spain) Atlético Marbella	Triangular Trophy.	
1970	Unknown.		
1971	(Spain) Xerez CD	(Spain) Atlético Marbella	2–1
1972–1973	Unknown.		
1974	(Spain) Atlético Marbella	Triangular Trophy.	
1975	(Spain) Málaga CF	Triangular Trophy.	
1976	(Spain) Granada CF	Triangular Trophy.	
1977	(Morocco) FAR Rabat	Triangular Trophy.	
1978	(Spain) Málaga CF	Triangular Trophy.	
1979	Not played.		
Trofeo Ciudad de Marbella
1980	(Spain) Sevilla FC	(Spain) Real Madrid Castilla	4–0
1981	(Spain) Sevilla FC	(Mexico) CD Puebla	2–1
1982	(Spain) Málaga CF	(England) Liverpool	1–1 (4–2 pen.)
1983	(Spain) Málaga CF	(Spain) Atlético Madrid	2–1
1984	(Portugal) Os Belenenses	(Spain) Real Madrid Castilla	4–2
1985	(Uruguay) Peñarol	(Spain) Real Betis	1–1 (4–3 pen.)
1986	(Spain) Real Betis	(Spain) Real Sociedad	2–1
1987	(Spain) Atlético Marbella	(Spain) Granada CF	x–x
1988	(Spain) Málaga CF	(Spain) Rayo Vallecano	2–1
1989	(Spain) Rayo Vallecano	(Spain) Atlético Marbella	4–0
1990	Unknown.		
1991	(Spain) Málaga CF	(Spain) Atlético Marbella	3–1
1992	(Spain) Atlético Marbella	(Spain) Atlético Madrid	2–1
Trofeo FORTA
1993	(Spain) Barcelona	Triangular Trophy.	
1994	(Spain) Atlético Madrid	(Belgium) Club Brugge	3–0
Trofeo Antena 3 Marbella
1995	(Spain) Atlético Madrid	(Spain) Real Zaragoza	4–0
1996	Unknown.		
Trofeo Ciudad de Marbella
1997	(Spain) Atlético Madrid	(Spain) Real Valladolid	2–2 (x–x pen.)
