= Radek Bejbl =

Czech former professional footballer

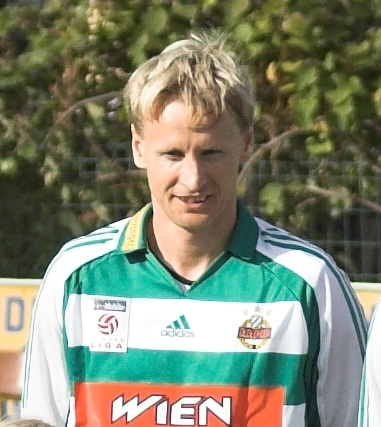
- Bejbl as a Rapid Wien player

Personal information
- Date of birth: 29 August 1972 (age 54)
- Place of birth: Nymburk, Czechoslovakia
- Height: 1.85 m (6 ft 1 in)
- Position: Defensive midfielder

Youth career
- 1982–1988: Lokomotiva Nymburk
- 1988–1989: Mladá Boleslav

Senior career*
Years	Team	Apps	(Gls)
1990–1996	Slavia Prague	154	(28)
1996–2000	Atlético Madrid	105	(2)
2000–2002	Lens	26	(0)
2002–2005	Slavia Prague	83	(2)
2005–2007	Rapid Wien	59	(3)
2007–2008	Slovan Liberec	8	(0)
Total		435	(35)

International career
1993	Czechoslovakia U21	3	(1)
1992–1993	Czechoslovakia	2	(0)
1995–2001	Czech Republic	56	(3)

Managerial career
- 2008–2018: Viktoria Žižkov (youth)
- 2018: Czech Republic U17
- 2019–2020: Czech Republic U16 and U17
- 2021–2022: Czech Republic U18
- 2022–2023: Czech Republic U19
- 2026–: Czech Republic (assistant)
Medal record
Men's football
Representing Czech Republic
UEFA European Championship
Runner-up	1996 England
SK Slavia Prague
Winner	Gambrinus liga	1995–96
- * Club domestic league appearances and goals

Radek Bejbl (born 29 August 1972) is a Czech former professional footballer who played as a defensive midfielder. He notably played four seasons with Atlético Madrid and played in the UEFA Euro 1996 final with the Czech Republic national team.

== Club career ==
=== Early career ===
Bejbl started his careers with Lokomotiva Nymburk and Mladá Boleslav. He made his league debut for Slavia Prague on 8 October 1990 in the 3–1 Czechoslovak First League win against Vítkovice, appearing as a substitute for Milan Šimůnek. Bejbl stayed with Slavia for six years, culminating in winning the Czech First League in 1996.

=== Spanish and French leagues ===
In summer 1996, Bejbl moved to Spain, and signed with Atlético Madrid. He appeared in 33 matches in his first season in La Liga and eventually helped the Colchoneros to consecutive Copa del Rey finals (both lost). Bejbl missed the 2000 Copa del Rey final after the Czech national team refused to release him from international duty. He left the club in 2000, after it suffered relegation.

Subsequently, Bejbl signed with RC Lens in the French Ligue 1, staying at the club for two seasons. During his time at Lens he played in defence as well as his usual position in midfield.

=== Later career ===
In 2002 Bejbl returned to former team Slavia for three additional campaigns.

Bejbl spent two years in Austria with SK Rapid Wien, playing 27 Bundesliga games in his second year to help to a fourth-place finish and qualification to the UEFA Intertoto Cup. Aged 35, he returned to his country signing a one-year contract for one final season with Slovan Liberec. He finished his professional career in 2008 and went on to become a youth coach for Prague side Viktoria Žižkov.

== International career ==
Bejbl played two matches for Czechoslovakia before the nation split. He played 56 matches and scored three goals for Czech Republic, participating at UEFA Euro 1996 and Euro 2000. In the former competition, he started in all the games as the nation reached the final, netting in a 2–1 group stage win against Italy.
