= 1996–97 UEFA Champions League =

European football tournament

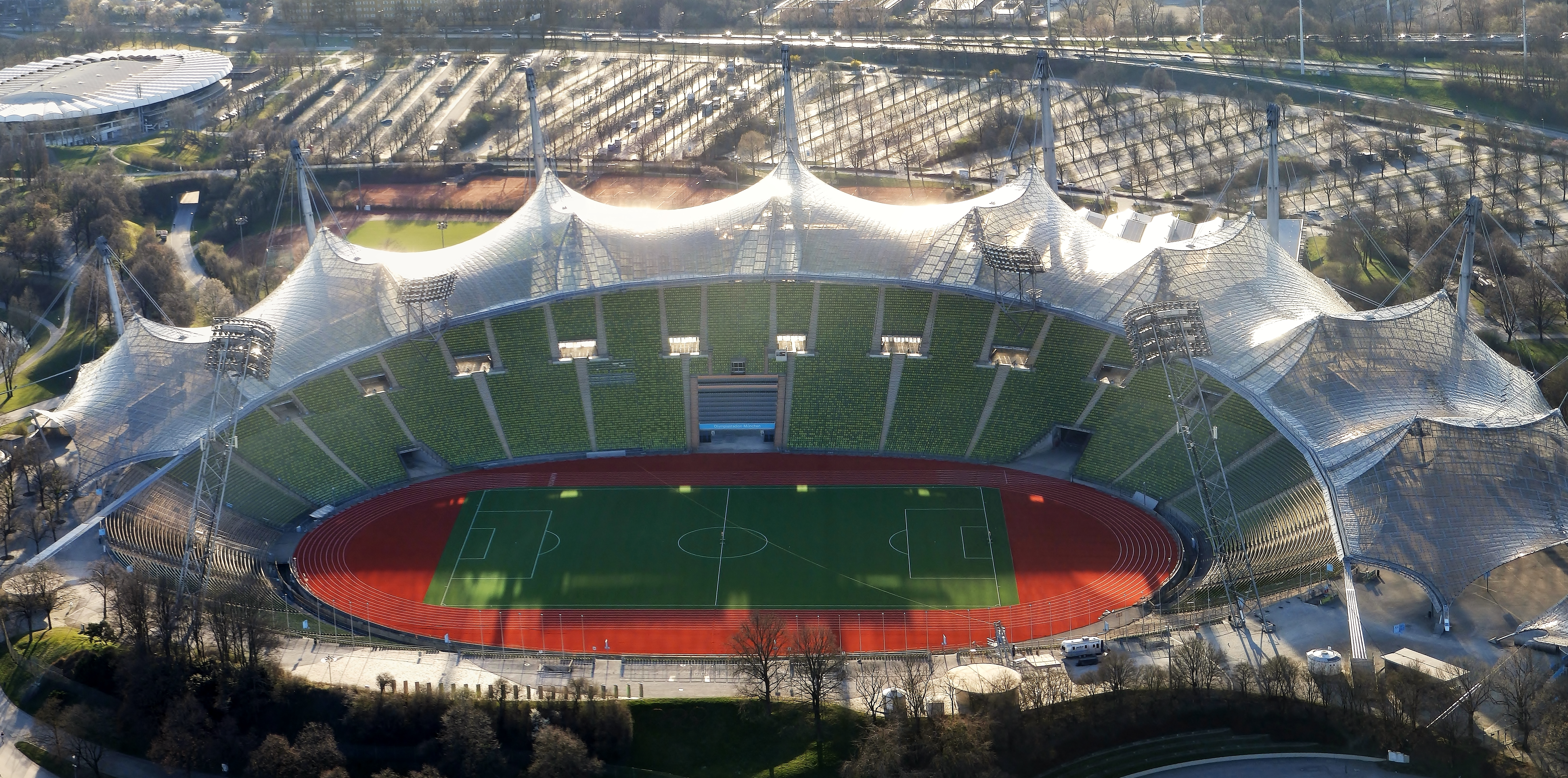
- The Olympiastadion in Munich held the final

Tournament details
- Dates: Qualifying: 7–21 August 1996; Competition proper: 11 September 1996 – 28 May 1997
- Teams: Competition proper: 16; Total: 24

Final positions
- Champions: (Germany) Borussia Dortmund (1st title)
- Runners-up: (Italy) Juventus

Tournament statistics
- Matches played: 61
- Goals scored: 161 (2.64 per match)
- Attendance: 2,093,228 (34,315 per match)
- Top scorer(s): Milinko Pantić (Atlético Madrid); 5 goals

The 1996–97 UEFA Champions League was the 42nd season of UEFA's premier European club football tournament, the fifth since its rebranding as the UEFA Champions League, and the last that involved only clubs that were champions of their domestic leagues or the title holders. Due to the Bosman ruling, restrictions on foreign players in matchday squads were lifted from this season.

The tournament was won by Borussia Dortmund in a 3–1 final victory against defending champions Juventus. It was their only title in the tournament to date, and the first title for Germany since its reunification in 1990.

Starting in this edition, UEFA had ruled that player's names on the back of the shirt as well as fixed squad numbers would become mandatory for all stages of the competition.

== Association team allocation ==
24 teams entered the competition: the national champions of each of the top 23 nations in the UEFA coefficient rankings, and UEFA Champions League holders, Juventus. The national champions of the associations ranked 1–7, plus the title holders, all received a bye to the group stage, while the national champions of the associations ranked 8–23 entered in the qualifying round. The remaining national champions from the associations ranked 24–48 were only allowed to participate in UEFA Cup.

=== Association ranking ===
For the 1996–97 UEFA Champions League, the associations were allocated places according to their 1996 UEFA association coefficients, which took into account their performance in European competitions from 1991–92 to 1995–96.

Apart from the allocation based on the association coefficients, an association could have an additional team participating in the Champions League, as noted below:

- (TH) – Additional berth for UEFA Champions League title holders

Association ranking for 1996–97 UEFA Champions League

Rank	Association	Coeff.	Teams	Notes
1	Italy	61.259	1	+1 (TH)
2	France	45.408	1	
3	Spain	43.932	1	
4	Germany	42.140	1	
5	Netherlands	38.700	1	
6	Portugal	32.800	1	
7	England	30.166	1	
8	Belgium	27.800	1	
9	Greece	27.000	1	
10	Russia	25.200	1	
11	Turkey	22.916	1	
12	Denmark	22.000	1	
13	Austria	21.950	1	
14	Sweden	18.750	1	
15	Switzerland	18.250	1	
16	Czech Republic	17.000	1	
17	Scotland	16.550	1	

Rank	Association	Coeff.	Teams	Notes
18	Norway	15.832	1	
19	Ukraine	15.665	1	
20	Hungary	15.249	1	
21	Romania	15.150	1	
22	Poland	14.916	1	
23	Israel	14.416	1	
24	Cyprus	12.665	0	
25	Croatia	12.500	0	
26	Latvia	11.166	0	
27	Slovakia	10.999	0	
28	Slovenia	10.332	0	
29	Georgia	10.000	0	
30	Iceland	9.666	0	
31	Finland	9.582	0	
32	Bulgaria	9.250	0	
33	Belarus	8.500	0	
34	Northern Ireland	5.332	0	

Rank	Association	Coeff.	Teams	Notes
35	Macedonia	5.000	0	
36	Moldova	5.000	0	
37	Republic of Ireland	4.331	0	
38	Malta	4.331	0	
39	Lithuania	4.000	0	
40	Albania	3.666	0	
41	Luxembourg	3.333	0	
42	Faroe Islands	3.000	0	
43	Liechtenstein	3.000	0	
44	Wales	2.666	0	
45	Armenia	2.500	0	
46	Estonia	2.000	0	
47	FR Yugoslavia	1.000	0	
48	Azerbaijan	0.500	0	
49	Andorra	0.000	0	
50	San Marino	0.000	0	

=== Distribution ===
Round	Teams entering in this round	Teams advancing from the previous round
Qualifying round (16 teams)	16 champions from associations 8–23	
Group stage (16 teams)	Title holders; 7 champions from associations 1–7	8 winners from the qualifying round
Knockout stage (8 teams)		4 group winners from the group stage; 4 group runners-up from the group stage

=== Teams ===
Group stage
(Italy) Juventus (TH)	(France) Auxerre (1st)	(Germany) Borussia Dortmund (1st)	(Portugal) Porto (1st)
(Italy) Milan (1st)	(Spain) Atlético Madrid (1st)	(Netherlands) Ajax (1st)	(England) Manchester United (1st)
Qualifying round
(Belgium) Club Brugge (1st)	(Denmark) Brøndby (1st)	(Czech Republic) Slavia Prague (1st)	(Hungary) Ferencváros (1st)
(Greece) Panathinaikos (1st)	(Austria) Rapid Wien (1st)	(Scotland) Rangers (1st)	(Romania) Steaua București (1st)
(Russia) Alania Vladikavkaz (1st)	(Sweden) IFK Göteborg (1st)	(Norway) Rosenborg (1st)	(Poland) Widzew Łódź (1st)
(Turkey) Fenerbahçe (1st)	(Switzerland) Grasshopper (1st)	(Ukraine) Dynamo Kyiv (1st)	(Israel) Maccabi Tel Aviv (1st)

1. Liechtenstein (LIE): The teams affiliated with the Liechtenstein Football Association (LFV) played in the Swiss football league system, and thus were ineligible for a spot regardless of the association ranking. The only competition organised by the LFV was the Liechtenstein Football Cup – the winners of which qualified for the 1996–97 UEFA Cup Winners' Cup.

== Round and draw dates ==
The schedule of the competition was as follows (all draws were held in Geneva, Switzerland).

Phase	Round	Draw date	First leg	Second leg
Qualifying round		6 July 1996	7 August 1996	21 August 1996
Group stage	Matchday 1	23 August 1996	11 September 1996	
Group stage	Matchday 2	23 August 1996	25 September 1996	
Group stage	Matchday 3	23 August 1996	16 October 1996	
Group stage	Matchday 4	23 August 1996	30 October 1996	
Group stage	Matchday 5	23 August 1996	20 November 1996	
Group stage	Matchday 6	23 August 1996	4 December 1996	
Knockout phase	Quarter-finals	23 August 1996	5 March 1997	19 March 1997
Knockout phase	Semi-finals	23 August 1996	9 April 1997	23 April 1997
Knockout phase	Final	23 August 1996	28 May 1997 at Olympiastadion, Munich	

== Qualifying round ==
The winners of each tie in the preliminary round entered the Champions League group stage, whilst the losers entered the UEFA Cup first round.

Team 1	Agg.	Team 2	1st leg	2nd leg
Maccabi Tel Aviv (Israel)	1–2	(Turkey) Fenerbahçe	0–1	1–1
Rangers (Scotland)	10–3	(Russia) Alania Vladikavkaz	3–1	7–2
Panathinaikos (Greece)	1–3	(Norway) Rosenborg	1–0	0–3 (a.e.t.)
IFK Göteborg (Sweden)	4–1	(Hungary) Ferencváros	3–0	1–1
Widzew Łódź (Poland)	4–4 (a)	(Denmark) Brøndby	2–1	2–3
Grasshopper (Switzerland)	6–0	(Czech Republic) Slavia Prague	5–0	1–0
Club Brugge (Belgium)	2–5	(Romania) Steaua București	2–2	0–3
Rapid Wien (Austria)	6–2	(Ukraine) Dynamo Kyiv	2–0	4–2

== Group stage ==
Location of teams of the 1996–97 UEFA Champions League group stage.
Brown: Group A; Red: Group B; Orange: Group C; Yellow: Group D.

Atlético Madrid, Auxerre, Fenerbahçe, Rapid Wien and Widzew Łódź made their debut in the group stage.

Italy became the first association to have two teams in the Champions League group stage.

=== Group A ===
Pos	Team	Pld	W	D	L	GF	GA	GD	Pts	Qualification	AUX	AJX	GRA	RAN
1	(France) Auxerre	6	4	0	2	8	7	+1	12	Advance to knockout stage	—	0–1	1–0	2–1
2	(Netherlands) Ajax	6	4	0	2	8	4	+4	12	Advance to knockout stage	1–2	—	0–1	4–1
3	(Switzerland) Grasshopper	6	3	0	3	8	5	+3	9		3–1	0–1	—	3–0
4	(Scotland) Rangers	6	1	0	5	5	13	−8	3		1–2	0–1	2–1	—

Source: UEFA

=== Group B ===
Pos	Team	Pld	W	D	L	GF	GA	GD	Pts	Qualification	ATM	DOR	WID	STE
1	(Spain) Atlético Madrid	6	4	1	1	12	4	+8	13	Advance to knockout stage	—	0–1	1–0	4–0
2	(Germany) Borussia Dortmund	6	4	1	1	14	8	+6	13	Advance to knockout stage	1–2	—	2–1	5–3
3	(Poland) Widzew Łódź	6	1	1	4	6	10	−4	4		1–4	2–2	—	2–0
4	(Romania) Steaua București	6	1	1	4	5	15	−10	4		1–1	0–3	1–0	—

Source: UEFA

=== Group C ===
Pos	Team	Pld	W	D	L	GF	GA	GD	Pts	Qualification	JUV	MUN	FEN	RWI
1	(Italy) Juventus	6	5	1	0	11	1	+10	16	Advance to knockout stage	—	1–0	2–0	5–0
2	(England) Manchester United	6	3	0	3	6	3	+3	9	Advance to knockout stage	0–1	—	0–1	2–0
3	(Turkey) Fenerbahçe	6	2	1	3	3	6	−3	7		0–1	0–2	—	1–0
4	(Austria) Rapid Wien	6	0	2	4	2	12	−10	2		1–1	0–2	1–1	—

Source: UEFA

=== Group D ===
Pos	Team	Pld	W	D	L	GF	GA	GD	Pts	Qualification	POR	ROS	MIL	GOT
1	(Portugal) Porto	6	5	1	0	12	4	+8	16	Advance to knockout stage	—	3–0	1–1	2–1
2	(Norway) Rosenborg	6	3	0	3	7	11	−4	9	Advance to knockout stage	0–1	—	1–4	1–0
3	(Italy) Milan	6	2	1	3	13	11	+2	7		2–3	1–2	—	4–2
4	(Sweden) IFK Göteborg	6	1	0	5	7	13	−6	3		0–2	2–3	2–1	—

Source: UEFA

== Knockout stage ==
=== Bracket ===
Quarter-finals
(Germany) Borussia Dortmund	3	1	4
(France) Auxerre	1	0	1
(England) Manchester United	4	0	4
(Portugal) Porto	0	0	0
(Netherlands) Ajax (a.e.t.)	1	3	4
(Spain) Atlético Madrid	1	2	3
(Norway) Rosenborg	1	0	1
(Italy) Juventus	1	2	3

Semi-finals
(Germany) Borussia Dortmund	1	1	2
(England) Manchester United	0	0	0
(Netherlands) Ajax	1	1	2
(Italy) Juventus	2	4	6

Final
28 May – Munich
(Germany) Borussia Dortmund	3
(Italy) Juventus	1

=== Quarter-finals ===
Team 1	Agg.	Team 2	1st leg	2nd leg
Borussia Dortmund (Germany)	4–1	(France) Auxerre	3–1	1–0
Manchester United (England)	4–0	(Portugal) Porto	4–0	0–0
Ajax (Netherlands)	4–3	(Spain) Atlético Madrid	1–1	3–2 (a.e.t.)
Rosenborg (Norway)	1–3	(Italy) Juventus	1–1	0–2

=== Semi-finals ===
Team 1	Agg.	Team 2	1st leg	2nd leg
Borussia Dortmund (Germany)	2–0	(England) Manchester United	1–0	1–0
Ajax (Netherlands)	2–6	(Italy) Juventus	1–2	1–4

=== Final ===
The final was played on 28 May 1997 at the Olympiastadion in Munich, Germany.

28 May 1997
20:30 UTC+2

Borussia Dortmund (Germany)	3–1	(Italy) Juventus
Riedle 29', 34'; Ricken 71'	Report	Del Piero 65'

Olympiastadion, Munich
Attendance: 59,000
Referee: Sándor Puhl (Hungary)

== Top goalscorers ==
Rank	Name	Team	Goals
1	(Federal Republic of Yugoslavia) Milinko Pantić	(Spain) Atlético Madrid	5
2	(Italy) Nicola Amoruso	(Italy) Juventus	4
2	(Brazil) Artur	(Portugal) Porto	4
2	(Croatia) Alen Bokšić	(Italy) Juventus	4
2	(Italy) Alessandro Del Piero	(Italy) Juventus	4
2	(Brazil) Mário Jardel	(Portugal) Porto	4
2	(Germany) Lars Ricken	(Germany) Borussia Dortmund	4
2	(Germany) Karl-Heinz Riedle	(Germany) Borussia Dortmund	4
2	(Italy) Marco Simone	(Italy) Milan	4
2	(Italy) Christian Vieri	(Italy) Juventus	4
2	(Argentina) Diego Simeone	(Spain) Atlético Madrid	4

== See also ==
- 1996 UEFA Intertoto Cup
- 1996–97 UEFA Cup
- 1996–97 UEFA Cup Winners' Cup
