= Nicola Amoruso =

Italian footballer

Personal information
- Date of birth: 29 August 1974 (age 52)
- Place of birth: Cerignola, Italy
- Height: 1.86 m (6 ft 1 in)
- Position: Forward

Senior career*
Years	Team	Apps	(Gls)
1993–1994	Sampdoria	8	(3)
1994–1995	Fidelis Andria	34	(15)
1995–1996	Padova	33	(14)
1996–2002	Juventus	53	(9)
1999–2000	→ Perugia (loan)	25	(11)
2000–2001	→ Napoli (co-ownership)	30	(10)
2002	Perugia	7	(0)
2003	Como	14	(6)
2003–2004	Modena	25	(5)
2004–2005	Messina	22	(5)
2005–2008	Reggina	96	(40)
2008–2009	Torino	20	(4)
2009	→ Siena (loan)	6	(0)
2009–2010	Parma	17	(5)
2010–2011	Atalanta	15	(1)
Total		405	(128)

International career
1995–1996	Italy U21	4	(1)
Medal record
Men's football
Representing Italy
UEFA European Under-21 Championship
Winner	1996 Spain
- * Club domestic league appearances and goals

Nicola Amoruso (born 29 August 1974) is an Italian former professional footballer who played as a forward. An elegant, technically gifted, and agile forward, known for his delicate touch on the ball and use of feints, he usually played in a central role; his nicknames were piede caldo (Hot Foot) and Dinamite (Dynamite), due to his eye for goal. He is currently the sporting director of Palermo.

== Club career ==
=== Early years ===
Amoruso grew up in the Sampdoria youth system, and made his Serie A debut on 12 December 1993, in a 2–0 away defeat to Inter Milan. During his first season with the club he won the Coppa Italia, scoring three goals in eight appearances throughout the competition. He has also later played with Fidelis Andria (1994–95) and Padova (1995–96).

=== Juventus and loans ===
Amoruso joined Juventus in 1996; he scored four goals in Juventus's 1996–97 UEFA Champions League campaign, including one each in both of the semifinal legs against Ajax. He only came on as a late substitute in the final that Juventus lost to Borussia Dortmund, although he was able to capture the 1996 UEFA Super Cup, the 1996 Intercontinental Cup, and the 1996–97 Serie A title with Juventus that season. The following season, he won the 1997 Supercoppa Italiana, and the 1997–98 Serie A title with Juventus. He scored in the return leg of the 1997–98 UEFA Champions League semifinal against Monaco, but was an unused substitute in the final, as Juventus suffered yet another defeat, at the hands of Real Madrid on this occasion. The 1998–99 season was less successful, as Juventus only managed to capture the 1999 UEFA Intertoto Cup.

Amoruso spent the 1999–2000 season on loan with Perugia, and the 2000–01 season on loan with Napoli, beforing returning to Juventus the following season. Amoruso won the 2001–02 Serie A title with Juventus, only making 9 appearances in the league, but helping the club to reach the 2002 Coppa Italia Final, finishing the competition as the top scorer, with 6 goals. In 2002, he moved to Perugia once again for half a season, and in January 2003, he subsequently played with Como, later moving to Modena for the 2003–04 Serie A season, and Messina for the 2004–05 Serie A season.

=== Messina and Reggina ===
In 2004, Amoruso signed with Messina on free transfer, after terminated his contract with Modena.

In 2005 Amoruso signed with Reggina. Along with Rolando Bianchi, they formed an effective striking partner for Reggina's survival battle. In 2007–08 season, Bianchi left the club and Amoruso became the team top scorer, ahead of Franco Brienza and midfielder Francesco Cozza. Reggina almost relegated that season, as ineffective of striker Christian Stuani, Joelson, Stephen Makinwa and Fabio Ceravolo.

=== Torino, Siena, Parma and Atalanta ===
On 8 July 2008, he agreed a move to Torino, signed a two-year contract and reunited with Rolando Bianchi, but during the January 2009 transfer window he transferred on loan with Siena.

After played the opening match of 2009–10 Serie B season for Toro, Amoruso moved to Parma with Julio César de León and Manuel Coppola move to opposite direction on loan on 28 August.

In January 2010, Amoruso signed a contract with Atalanta which last until June 2011. Robert Acquafresca, moved back to Genoa from Atalanta, while Hernán Crespo moved to Parma from Genoa. Atalanta also paid Parma €1 million for the service of Amoruso.

He retired in September 2011.

== International career ==
Amoruso represented the Italy under-21 team on 4 occasions between 1994 and 1996, scoring once. He was the unused member of the Italy Olympic team that won the 1997 Mediterranean Games. He also won the 1996 UEFA European Under-21 Football Championship with Italy.

== Honours ==
Sampdoria

- Coppa Italia: 1993–94

Juventus

- Serie A: 1996–97, 1997–98, 2001–02
- Supercoppa Italiana: 1997
- UEFA Champions League: runner-up: 1996–97, 1997–98
- UEFA Super Cup: 1996

Atalanta

- Serie B: 2010–11

Italy U21

- UEFA European Under-21 Championship: 1996

Individual

- Coppa Italia top scorer: 2001–02 (6 goals)
