= Sándor Puhl =

Hungarian football referee (1955–2021)

- Born: 14 July 1955; Miskolc, Hungary
- Died: 20 May 2021 (aged 65); Budapest, Hungary
- Other occupation: Director

Domestic
Years	League	Role
1984–2000	NB I	Referee

International
Years	League	Role
1988–2000	FIFA–listed	Referee

Sándor Puhl (14 July 1955 – 20 May 2021) was a Hungarian football referee, best known for officiating four matches in the 1994 FIFA World Cup, including the final.

== Career ==
At international level, Puhl officiated the 1993 Artemio Franchi Cup between Argentina and Denmark, at the Estadio José María Minella; following a 1–1 draw, Argentina won the match 5–4 on penalties. The following year, he officiated four matches in the 1994 FIFA World Cup in the United States, including the final. between Brazil and Italy at the Rose Bowl; Brazil won the match 3–2 on penalties after a 0–0 draw. In the quarter-final match between Italy and Spain, he failed to send off Italy's Mauro Tassotti for elbowing Spanish player Luis Enrique in the final minutes of the match, as he did not see the incident; Italy won 2–1.

At club level, he refereed the first leg of the 1993 UEFA Cup final, between Juventus and Borussia Dortmund, with Juventus winning 3–1 at the Westfalenstadion in Dortmund, and later claiming the title 6–1 on aggregate. He also refereed UEFA Champions League matches, including the 1997 UEFA Champions League final, once again between Borussia Dortmund and Juventus at the Olympiastadion in Munich; Dortmund won the match 3–1 on that occasion. During the match, Puhl disallowed a goal by Christian Vieri in the first half for an alleged handball, and was criticised in the Italian media for not awarding two penalties to Juventus.

Sándor Puhl is also well-known for refereeing the second leg of the last World Cup play-off qualifier for the 1998 World Cup in France between Iran and Australia in 1997, where Iran came from 2–0 down to tie the game 2–2 and qualify for the World Cup due to the away goal rule.

He was elected as IFFHS' World's Best Referee of the Year four consecutive times, from 1994 to 1997.

== After retirement ==
After retiring as a referee in 2000, he was deputy chairman of the Hungarian Football Association (2000–2006). He also worked as a co-commentator for a Hungarian sports TV channel.

== Personal life ==
Puhl spoke Hungarian, German, Italian, and English.

Puhl died on 20 May 2021, at the age of 65 from post-COVID-19 complications during the COVID-19 pandemic in Hungary.

== Major matches refereed ==
Date	Match	Tournament	Ref
24 February 1993	Argentina vs. Denmark (1–1; 5–4 on penalties)	1993 Artemio Franchi Cup	
5 May 1993	Borussia Dortmund vs. Juventus (1–3; 1–6 on aggregate)	1993 UEFA Cup final (first leg)	
17 July 1994	Brazil vs. Italy (0–0; 3–2 on penalties)	1994 FIFA World Cup final	
28 May 1997	Borussia Dortmund vs. Juventus (3–1)	1997 UEFA Champions League final	

== Honours ==
- IFFHS' World's Best Referee of the Year (4): 1994, 1995, 1996, 1997

Sporting positions (Hungary) Sándor Puhl
Preceded by 1985 Artemio Franchi Cup (Argentina) Abel Gnecco	1993 Artemio Franchi Cup	Succeeded by 2022 Finalissima (Chile) Piero Maza
Preceded by 1990 FIFA World Cup final (Mexico) Edgardo Codesal Méndez	1994 FIFA World Cup final	Succeeded by 1998 FIFA World Cup final (Morocco) Said Belqola
Preceded by 1996 UEFA Champions League final (Spain) Manuel Díaz Vega	1997 UEFA Champions League final	Succeeded by 1998 UEFA Champions League final (Germany) Hellmut Krug
