= Milinko Pantić =

Serbian footballer and manager

Personal information
- Date of birth: 5 September 1966 (age 60)
- Place of birth: Loznica, SFR Yugoslavia
- Height: 1.78 m (5 ft 10 in)
- Position: Midfielder

Youth career
- Jedinstvo Mali Zvornik

Senior career*
Years	Team	Apps	(Gls)
1985–1991	Partizan	65	(11)
1991	Olimpija Ljubljana	14	(0)
1991–1995	Panionios	120	(51)
1995–1998	Atlético Madrid	106	(18)
1998–1999	Le Havre	19	(2)
1999–2000	Panionios	23	(4)
Total		347	(86)

International career
1996	FR Yugoslavia	2	(0)

Managerial career
- 2011–2012: Atlético Madrid B
- 2013–2014: FC Baku
- 2016: Dalian Yifang
- * Club domestic league appearances and goals

Milinko Pantić (Serbian Cyrillic: Милинко Пантић; born 5 September 1966) is a Serbian retired footballer and current manager.

== Playing career ==
Pantić spent the first six seasons of his professional career with FK Partizan between 1985 and 1991.

He then moved on to Greek Alpha Ethniki league where he played until 1995 for Athens side Panionios.

At almost 29 years of age, he was brought to Atlético Madrid by their new coach Radomir Antić who knew Pantić well from his Partizan days. The move turned out to be a hit as Pantić's creative midfield presence provided the extra edge to Atlético side that won the double (La Liga and Copa del Rey) in the 1995–96 season. Pantić contributed with 10 goals in 41 appearances, including the winner in the 1996 Copa del Rey Final, and countless assists. In the 1996–97 UEFA Champions League he scored five goals, finishing as the top-scorer of the tournament (to this date he is the only Atlético Madrid player to achieve this). He spent two more seasons in Madrid with a total of 18 goals in 106 matches in his career there.

He moved to Le Havre AC during summer 1998 for a season. In the summer of 1999, Pantić transferred back to Panionios where he spent the last year of his playing career.

=== International ===
He earned two caps for the FR Yugoslavia national team in World Cup qualification matches in 1996.

== Coaching career ==
Pantić went back to Atlético Madrid as a coach in Atletico's youth system, working with kids 3 to 9 years of age in the club's training facility in Majadahonda. From there he moved up the ranks coaching different youth squads. He became head of the youth and developing squads at the club while managing certain squads at the same time.

During the summer of 2011 Pantić became coach of Atlético Madrid B (Atlético Madrid reserve squad) after his great success with the youth and developing squads at the club and after just about missing out on being coach of the first team.

He also plays for Atlético Madrid's Indoor-Soccer team, competing in the veteran league which comprises nine clubs that have won the La Liga title throughout history.

Pantić was appointed as manager of Azerbaijan Premier League team FC Baku in June 2013, little over a year later, 24 July 2014, Pantić left the club by mutual consent.

On 5 July 2016, Pantić was announced as the head coach of China League One team Dalian Yifang.

== Accolades ==
Paul Lambert in naming the best one to eleven he played against named Pantic as the direct opponent who gave him his most difficult time during Lambert's playing career.

== Honours ==
Partizan

- Yugoslav First League: 1985-86, 1986–87
- Yugoslav Cup: 1988-89
- Yugoslav Super Cup: 1989

Atlético de Madrid

- La Liga: 1995–96
- Copa del Rey: 1995–96

Individual

- UEFA Champions League Top Scorer: 1996–97
