= 1995–96 Atlético Madrid season =

90th season in existence of Atlético Madrid

Atlético Madrid
1995–96 season
- President: Jesús Gil
- Head coach: Radomir Antić
- Stadium: Vicente Calderón
- La Liga: 1st (in UEFA Champions League)
- Copa del Rey: Winners
- Top goalscorer: League: Lyuboslav Penev (16); All: Lyuboslav Penev (22)
- Highest home attendance: 60,000 vs Albacete Balompié (25 May 1996)
- Lowest home attendance: 3,000 vs Almería CF (8 November 1995)
- Average home league attendance: 45,476
Home colours	Away colours

The 1995–1996 campaign was the 90th season in Atlético Madrid's history and their 60th season in La Liga, the top division of Spanish football. The team won 'The Double' both La Liga and Copa del Rey in a great season for supporters.

== Summary ==
During summer club president Jesus Gil y Gil appointed Real Oviedo manager Radomir Antic as the new head coach. Meanwhile, bids on Real Oviedo midfielders Robert Prosinecki, Slavisa Jokanovic, Spartak Moscow central back Viktor Onopko and young Albacete Forward Fernando Morientes (he chose to play Real Zaragoza instead) were failed to reinforce the squad, meaning that the upcoming arrivals have to take the team for the season. Gil y Gil transferred in Goalkeeper José Francisco Molina and Defender Santi Denia from Albacete, Lubo Penev from Valencia CF, midfielders Milinko Pantic and Roberto Fresnedoso from RCD Espanyol.

The season is best remembered by the club clinching La Liga and Copa del Rey.

== Squad ==
Squad at end of season

Note: Flags indicate national team as defined under FIFA eligibility rules; some limited exceptions apply. Players may hold more than one non-FIFA nationality.

No.	Pos.	Nation	Player
1	GK	ESP	José Francisco Molina
2	DF	ESP	Tomás
3	DF	ESP	Toni
4	DF	ESP	Roberto Solozábal
5	DF	ESP	Juanma López
6	DF	ESP	Santi Denia
7	FW	ARG	Leonardo Biagini
8	MF	ESP	Juan Vizcaíno
9	FW	BUL	Lyuboslav Penev
10	MF	YUG	Milinko Pantić
11	MF	ESP	Pirri
12	FW	URU	Fernando Correa

No.	Pos.	Nation	Player
13	GK	ESP	Ricardo
14	MF	ARG	Diego Simeone
15	MF	RSA	Quinton Fortune
16	MF	ESP	José de la Sagra
17	FW	ESP	Juan Carlos
18	MF	ESP	Roberto
19	FW	ESP	Kiko
20	DF	ESP	Delfí Geli
21	MF	ESP	Jose Luis Perez Caminero
25	DF	BRA	Iván Rocha
26	GK	ESP	Felipe

=== Left club during season ===
Note: Flags indicate national team as defined under FIFA eligibility rules; some limited exceptions apply. Players may hold more than one non-FIFA nationality.

No.	Pos.	Nation	Player
23	MF	ESP	Dani (to Mallorca)

=== Transfers ===
In
Pos.	Name	from	Type
GK	José Molina	Albacete	
DF	Santi Denia	Albacete	
FW	Fernando Correa	River Plate	
MF	Milinko Pantić	Panionios	
FW	Lyuboslav Penev	Valencia	
MF	Roberto Fresnedoso	Espanyol	
FW	Leonardo Biagini	Newell's Old Boys	

Out
Pos.	Name	To	Type
MF	Patxi Ferreira	Valencia	
GK	Abel Resino	Rayo Vallecano	
FW	Adolfo Valencia	Independiente	
FW	Roman Kosecki	Nantes	
MF	Igor Dobrovolski	Fortuna Düsseldorf	
MF	Manel Ruano	Real Valladolid	
DF	Alejandro Sanchez	Albacete	

==== Winter ====
In
Pos.	Name	from	Type
MF	Quinton Fortune	RCD Mallorca	

Out
Pos.	Name	To	Type
DF	Ivan Rocha	Real Valladolid	loan

Source: BDFutbol.com

== Competitions ==
=== La Liga ===
==== League table ====
Pos	Team	Pld	W	D	L	GF	GA	GD	Pts	Qualification or relegation
1	Atlético Madrid (C)	42	26	9	7	75	32	+43	87	Qualification for the Champions League group stage
2	Valencia	42	26	5	11	77	51	+26	83	Qualification for the UEFA Cup first round
3	Barcelona	42	22	14	6	72	39	+33	80	Qualification for the Cup Winners' Cup first round (Note: Since Atlético Madrid, winners of 1995–96 Copa del Rey, was qualified for the 1996–97 UEFA Champions League, losing cup finalists Barcelona earned a spot in the first round of the 1996–97 UEFA Cup Winners' Cup.)
4	Espanyol	42	20	14	8	63	36	+27	74	Qualification for the UEFA Cup first round
5	Tenerife	42	20	12	10	69	54	+15	72	Qualification for the UEFA Cup first round

Source: LFP
Rules for classification: 1) points; 2) head-to-head points; 3) head-to-head goal difference; 4) head-to-head goals scored; 5) goal difference; 6) number of goals scored.
(C) Champions

==== Results by round ====
Round	1	2	3	4	5	6	7	8	9	10	11	12	13	14	15	16	17	18	19	20	21	22	23	24	25	26	27	28	29	30	31	32	33	34	35	36	37	38	39	40	41	42
Ground	H	A	A	H	A	H	A	H	A	H	A	H	A	H	A	H	A	H	A	H	A	A	H	H	A	H	A	H	A	H	A	H	A	H	A	H	A	H	A	H	A	H
Result	W	W	W	W	D	W	W	W	W	D	W	D	L	W	L	W	W	W	W	W	D	L	W	W	W	L	W	W	D	L	W	D	W	L	D	D	W	L	W	W	D	W
Position	3	1	1	1	2	1	1	1	1	1	1	1	2	1	1	1	1	1	1	1	1	1	1	1	1	1	1	1	1	1	1	1	1	1	1	1	1	1	1	1	1	1

Source: Competitive matches
A = Away; H = Home; W = Win; D = Draw; L = Loss; = Leader, 1996–97 UEFA Champions League Group stage; = 1996–97 UEFA Cup First round; = 1996–97 UEFA Cup Winners' Cup

==== Matches ====
2 September 1995 1	Atletico Madrid	4-1	Real Sociedad	Madrid
	Pantic 35'; Penev 65'; Penev 73' (pen.); Simeone 75'	Report	Karpin 24'	Stadium: Vicente Calderon; Attendance: 45,000; Referee: Rubio Valdivieso

9 September 1995 2	Racing de Santander	0–4	Atletico Madrid	Santander
		Report	Penev 46' (pen.); Caminero 50'; Simeone 87'; Penev 90'	Stadium: El Sardinero; Attendance: 16,627; Referee: Prados Garcia

15 September 1995 3	Athletic de Bilbao	0-2	Atletico Madrid	Bilbao
			Kiko 16'; Penev 64'	Stadium: San Mamés; Attendance: 34,000; Referee: Ansuategui Roca

23 September 1995 4	Atletico Madrid	2–0	Sporting de Gijón	Madrid
	Vizcaino 9'; Penev 53' (pen.)			Stadium: Vicente Calderón; Attendance: 55,000; Referee: Andradas Asurmendi

1 October 1995 5	Sevilla FC	0-0	Atletico Madrid	Sevilla
				Stadium: Ramon Sanchez Pizjuan; Attendance: 25,000; Referee: Carmona Mendez

5 October 1995 6	Atletico Madrid	2-1	RCD Espanyol	Madrid
	Kiko 5'; Pantic 65'		Lardin 45'	Stadium: Vicente Calderón; Attendance: 55,000; Referee: Diaz Vega

8 October 1995 7	RC Celta	0-3	Atletico Madrid	Vigo
			Simeone 34'; Kiko 58'; Kiko 67'	Stadium: Balaídos; Attendance: 21,000; Referee: Fernandez Marin

14 October 1995 8	Atletico Madrid	1-0	Deportivo La Coruña	Madrid
	Simeone 45'			Stadium: Vicente Calderón; Attendance: 50,000; Referee: Marin Lopez

21 October 1995 9	Real Valladolid	0-1	Atletico Madrid	Valladolid
			Simeone 52'	Stadium: José Zorrilla; Attendance: 22,000; Referee: Lopez Nieto

28 October 1995 10	Atlético de Madrid	1-1	CP Mérida	Madrid
	Angel Luis 45' (o.g.)		Prieto 1'	Stadium: Vicente Calderón; Attendance: 50,000; Referee: Iturralde Gonzalez

4 November 1995 11	Real Zaragoza	0-1	Atlético de Madrid	Zaragoza
			Simeone 67'	Stadium: La Romareda; Attendance: 30,000; Referee: Mejuto Gonzalez

11 November 1995 12	Atlético de Madrid	0-0	Rayo Vallecano	Madrid
				Stadium: Vicente Calderón; Attendance: 43,000; Referee: Lopez De la Fuente

17 November 1995 13	Real Madrid	1-0	Atlético de Madrid	Madrid
	Raúl 9'; Sanchís (yellow card); Alkorta (yellow card); Luis Enrique (yellow card); Zamorano (yellow card)	Report	Caminero (yellow card) (yellow-red card); Santi Denia (yellow card); Simeone (yellow card); Lubo Penev (yellow card)	Stadium: Santiago Bernabéu; Referee: Díaz Vega

25 November 1995 14	Atlético de Madrid	3-0	Real Oviedo	Madrid
	Vizcaino 21'; Simeone 61'; Lopez 87'			Stadium: Vicente Calderon; Attendance: 35,000; Referee: Barrenechea Montero

2 December 1995 15	Real Betis	2-1	Atlético de Madrid	Sevilla
	Jarni 27'; Pier 38'		Penev 32' (pen.)	Stadium: Benito Villamarin; Attendance: 40,000; Referee: Andradas Asurmendi

9 December 1995 16	Atlético de Madrid	3-1	FC Barcelona	Madrid
	Lubo Penev 3' (pen.); Lubo Penev 12'; Caminero 81'	Report	Velamazan 87'	Stadium: Vicente Calderón; Attendance: 58,000; Referee: Prados Garcia

17 December 1995 17	Valencia CF	0–1	Atlético de Madrid	Valencia
			88' Caminero	Stadium: Mestalla; Attendance: 30,000; Referee: Gracia Redondo

19 December 1995 18	Atlético de Madrid	3-0	SD Compostela	Madrid
	Penev 19'; Simeone 79'; Roberto 83'; Simeone (yellow card)	Report	(yellow card) Mauro; (yellow card) Bellido; (yellow card) Fabiano	Stadium: Vicente Calderon; Referee: Lopez Nieto

2 January 1996 19	UD Salamanca	1-3	Atlético de Madrid	Villares de la Reina
	Vellisca 79'; Sito (yellow card); Torrecilla (yellow card)	Report	54' Caminero; 60' (pen.) Penev; 89' Roberto; (yellow card) Molina; (yellow card) Caminero '73 Kiko	Stadium: Helmántico Stadium; Referee: Carmona Mendez

6 January 1996 20	Atlético de Madrid	3-1	CD Tenerife	Madrid
	Juan Carlos 24'; Lopez 82'; Penev 89'; Geli (yellow card); Vizcaino (yellow card)	Report	52' Juanele; (yellow card) 54' (yellow-red card) Jokanovic; (yellow card) Carlos Aguilera; (yellow card) Llorente	Stadium: Vicente Calderon; Referee: Puentes Leira

12 January 1996 21	Albacete Balompié	1-1	Atlético de Madrid	Albacete
	Solozabal 76' (o.g.); Bjelica (yellow card); Coco (yellow card)	Report	88' (yellow card) Simeone	Stadium: Carlos Belmonte; Referee: Brito Arceo

20 January 1996 22	Real Sociedad	1-0	Atlético de Madrid	San Sebastián
	De Paula 34'; Albistegui (yellow card); Idiakez (yellow card)	Report	(yellow card) Lopez; (yellow card) Santi	Stadium: Nuevo Anoeta; Referee: Mejuto Gonzalez

23 January 1996 23	Atlético de Madrid	2-0	Racing de Santander	Madrid
	Penev 5'; Kiko 89'; Santi (yellow card); Simeone (yellow card); Tomas (yellow card)	Report	(yellow card) Roncal; (yellow card) Pablo Alfaro; (yellow card) 85' (yellow-red card) Esteban Torre; (yellow card) Alberto; (red card) 78' Alvaro Cervera	Stadium: Vicente Calderon; Referee: Ansuategui Roca

27 January 1996 24	Atlético de Madrid	4-1	Athletic de Bilbao	Madrid
	Kiko 16' (yellow card); Pantić 43'; Penev 67' (pen.); Biagini 71'; Santi (yellow card); Caminero (yellow card)	Report	28' Etxeberria; (yellow card) Galdames; (yellow card) Oskar Vales; (yellow card) Goikoetxea	Stadium: Vicente Calderón; Referee: Asurmendi

2 February 1996 25	Sporting de Gijón	1-2	Atlético de Madrid	Gijón
	Ledhiakov 72' (pen.)	Report	25' (yellow card) Pantic; 68' Caminero; (red card) 71' Santi; (yellow card) Pirri Mori; (yellow card) Kiko	Stadium: Estadio El Molinon; Referee: Japon Sevilla

10 February 1996 26	Atlético de Madrid	0-1	Sevilla FC	Madrid
	Geli (yellow card)	Report	77' Moya; (yellow card) Martagon; (yellow card) Jimenez; (yellow card) Suker; (yellow card) Pineda	Stadium: Vicente Calderón; Referee: Gomez Lopez

17 February 1996 27	RCD Espanyol	0-2	Atlético de Madrid	Barcelona
	Arteaga (yellow card); Brnovic (yellow card)	Report	43' (yellow card) Kiko; 75' Penev; (yellow card) 80' (yellow-red card) Santi; (yellow card) Simeone	Stadium: Montjuic; Referee: Brito Arceo

24 February 1996 28	Atlético	3-2	RC Celta	Madrid
	Juan Carlos 15'; Simeone 21' (yellow card); Caminero 72'; Lopez (yellow card); Pantic (yellow card)	Report	7' Gudelj; 44' Gudelj (yellow card); (yellow card) Agirretxu; (yellow card) Berges; (yellow card) Eusebio; (yellow card) Lakabeg	Stadium: Vicente Calderón; Referee: Rodriguez Martel

2 March 1996 29	Deportivo La Coruña	2-2	Atlético	La Coruña
	David 48'; Radchenko 84' (yellow card); Djukic (red card) 74'; Fran (yellow card); Donato (yellow card); Alfredo (yellow card); Manjarin (yellow card)	Report	40' Penev; 59' (pen.) Pantic; (yellow card) Vizcaino; (yellow card) Caminero; (yellow card) Kiko	Stadium: Riazor; Referee: Dauden Ibañez

9 March 1996 30	Atlético	0-2	Real Valladolid	Madrid
	Caminero (yellow card)	Report	78' Peternac; 88' Peternac; (yellow card) Fernando; (yellow card) Gutierrez; (yellow card) Baraja	Stadium: Vicente Calderón; Referee: Puentes Leira

16 March 1996 31	CP Mérida	0–1	Atlético de Madrid	Mérida
	Sierra (yellow card); Monreal (yellow card)	Report	59' Kiko; (yellow card) Solozabal	Stadium: Municipal; Referee: Barrenechea Moreno

23 March 1996 32	Atlético de Madrid	1–1	Real Zaragoza	Madrid
	Pantic 32' (pen.); Solozabal (yellow card); Santi (yellow card); Toni Muñoz (yellow card); Penev (yellow card)	Report	30' Morientes; (yellow card) Aguado; (yellow card) Solana; (yellow card) Poyet; (yellow card) 84' (yellow-red card) Garcia Sanjuan	Stadium: Vicente Calderón; Referee: Prados Garcia

26 March 1996 33	Rayo Vallecano	0-3	Atlético de Madrid	Madrid
	De Quintana (red card) 75'; Calderon (yellow card); Martin Gonzalez (yellow card)	Report	20' (yellow card) 72' (yellow-red card) Biagini; 55' Pantic; 82' (pen.) (yellow card) Pantic; (yellow card) Geli; (yellow card) Tomas; (yellow card) Lopez; (yellow card) Simeone; (yellow card) Kiko	Stadium: Vallecas; Referee: Iturralde Gonzalez

29 March 1996 34	Atlético de Madrid	1-2	Real Madrid	Madrid
	Pantic 84' (pen.); Santi (yellow card); Simeone (red card) 55'	Report	26' (yellow card) Soler; 63' (yellow card) Laudrup; (yellow card) 83' (yellow-red card) Hierro; (yellow card) Sanz; (yellow card) Garcia Calvo	Stadium: Vicente Calderón; Referee: Carmona Mendez

5 April 1996 35	Real Oviedo	1-1	Atlético	Oviedo
	Carlos 59'; Andres (yellow card); Suarez (yellow card); Berto (yellow card)	Report	32' Caminero; (yellow card) Toni Muñoz	Stadium: Carlos Tartiere; Referee: Lopez Nieto

13 April 1996 36	Atlético de Madrid	1-1	Real Betis	Madrid
	Pirri Mori 44'; Solozabal (yellow card); Lopez (yellow card); Toni Muñoz (yellow card); Pirri Mori (yellow card); Simeone (yellow card)	Report	43' Alfonso; (yellow card) 68' (yellow-red card) Olias; (yellow card) Stosic	Stadium: Vicente Calderón; Referee: Mejuto Gonzalez

20 April 1996 37	FC Barcelona	1-3	Atlético	Barcelona
	Jordi Cruyff 25'; Popescu (yellow card); Sergi (yellow card); Hagi (yellow card); De la Peña (yellow card); Amor (yellow card)	Report	10' Roberto; 48' Vizcaíno; 87' Biagini; (yellow card) Geli; (yellow card) Santi; (yellow card) Toni Muñoz; (yellow card) Pantic; (yellow card) Lopez	Stadium: Camp Nou; Attendance: 90,000; Referee: Prados García

26 April 1996 38	Atlético	2–3	Valencia CF	Madrid
	Pantic 44' (yellow card); Geli 57'; Solozabal (yellow card); Santi (yellow card); Simeone (yellow card); Kiko (red card) 76'	Report	11' Mijatovic; 55' (pen.) Mijatovic; 74' Poyatos; (yellow card) Otero; (yellow card) Poyatos; (yellow card) Jose Ignacio; (yellow card) Engonga	Stadium: Vicente Calderón; Referee: Dauden Ibañez

3 May 1996 39	SD Compostela	1-3	Atlético	Santiago de Compostela
	Christensen 87'; Villena (red card) 41'; Jose Ramon (yellow card)	Report	7' Caminero; 48' Simeone; 80' Caminero; (yellow card) Santi; (yellow card) Caminero; (yellow card) Simeone; (yellow card) Vizcaino	Stadium: Multiusos de San Lazaro; Referee: Gracia Redondo

11 May 1996 40	Atlético	2-1	UD Salamanca	Madrid
	Kiko 17'; Kiko 84'	Report	66' (yellow card) Stinga; (yellow card) Luis Manuel	Stadium: Vicente Calderón; Referee: Andradas Asurmendi

17 May 1996 41	CD Tenerife	1-1	Atlético de Madrid	Tenerife
	Pizzi 50'; Felipe (yellow card); Vivar Dorado (yellow card)	Report	88' (o.g.) Cesar Gomez; (yellow card) Solozabal; (yellow card) Simeone	Stadium: Gran Canaria; Referee: Lopez Nieto

25 May 1996 42	Atlético de Madrid	2-0	Albacete Balompié	Madrid
	Simeone 13'; Kiko 31'; Pantic (yellow card); Caminero (yellow card); Biagini (yellow card)	Report	(yellow card) Coco; (red card) 82' Sotero; (yellow card) Josico	Stadium: Estadio Vicente Calderón; Attendance: 60,000; Referee: Diaz Vega

=== Copa del Rey ===
Second Round

24 October 1995	Almería CF	1-4	Atlético de Madrid	Almería

7 November 1995	Atlético de Madrid	2-1	Almería CF	Madrid
				Stadium: Vicente Calderón

Third Round

27 November 1995	Atlético de Madrid	4-1	CP Mérida	Madrid
				Stadium: Vicente Calderón

12 December 1995 4	CP Mérida	4-4	Atlético de Madrid	Mérida

Round of 16

9 January 1996	Atlético de Madrid	1-1	Real Betis	Madrid
				Stadium: Vicente Calderón

16 January 1996	Real Betis	1-2	Atlético de Madrid	Sevilla

==== Quarterfinals ====
31 January 1996	Tenerife	0–0	Atlético Madrid	Santa Cruz de Tenerife
23:00 CET		Report (in Spanish)		Stadium: Heliodoro Rodríguez López; Attendance: 22,000; Referee: Díaz Vega (Asturias)

15 February 1996	Atlético Madrid	3–0	Tenerife	Madrid
21:30 CET	Penev 18', 41', 76'	Report (in Spanish)		Stadium: Vicente Calderón; Attendance: 15,000; Referee: Gracia Redondo (Aragon)

==== Semifinals ====
21 February 1996	Valencia CF	3-5	Atlético de Madrid	Valencia
	Gálvez 6'; Fernando 44'; Mijatović 90'		Pantić 47', 64'; Biagini 72'; Juan Carlos 80'; Roberto 88'	Stadium: Mestalla

29 February 1996	Atlético de Madrid	1-2	Valencia CF	Madrid
	Pantić 45' (pen.)		Viola 20'; Fernando 53'	Stadium: Vicente Calderon

==== Final ====
10 April 1996	FC Barcelona	0–1	Atlético Madrid	Zaragoza
	Celades 17'; Bakero (yellow card) 18'; Sergi Barjuan (yellow card) 17'; Hagi (yellow card) 36'; Nadal (yellow card) 66'; Roger (yellow card) 104'; Sergi Barjuan (yellow card) 117' (yellow-red card)	Report	(yellow card) 25' Santi Denia; (yellow card) 35' Toni; 102' Pantic; (yellow card) 112' Solozabal; (yellow card) 113' Molina; (yellow card) 116' (yellow-red card) Solozabal	Stadium: La Romareda; Attendance: 32,500; Referee: Manuel Díaz Vega

== Statistics ==
=== Players statistics ===
Starts + substitute appearances

No.	Pos	Nat	Player	Total		La Liga		Copa del Rey	
No.	Pos	Nat	Player	Apps	Goals	Apps	Goals	Apps	Goals
1	GK	(Spain) ESP	José Molina	53	-46	42	-32	11	-14
20	DF	(Spain) ESP	Delfí Geli	49	2	39	1	9+1	1
4	DF	(Spain) ESP	Roberto Solozábal	49	0	40	0	9	0
6	DF	(Spain) ESP	Santi Denia	48	0	37	0	11	0
3	DF	(Spain) ESP	Toni Muñoz	50	0	40	0	9+1	0
10	MF	(Federal Republic of Yugoslavia) YUG	Milinko Pantić	50	17	41	10	7+2	7
14	MF	(Argentina) ARG	Diego Simeone	45	12	37	12	8	0
8	MF	(Spain) ESP	Juan Vizcaíno	49	3	34+7	3	7+1	0
21	MF	(Spain) ESP	José Luis Caminero	47	9	35+2	9	9+1	0
9	FW	(Bulgaria) BUL	Lubo Penev	44	22	36+1	16	6+1	6
19	FW	(Spain) ESP	Kiko	40	13	34	11	6	2
13	GK	(Spain) ESP	Ricardo	0	0	0	0	0	0
18	MF	(Spain) ESP	Roberto	39	4	19+12	3	4+4	1
5	DF	(Spain) ESP	Juanma Lopez	42	4	11+21	2	6+4	2
7	FW	(Argentina) ARG	Leonardo Biagini	37	5	5+23	3	5+4	2
11	MF	(Spain) ESP	Pirri Mori	25	2	5+14	1	4+2	1
17	FW	(Spain) ESP	Juan Carlos	16	3	3+10	2	0+3	1
2	DF	(Spain) ESP	Tomás Reñones	17	0	2+10	0	4+1	0
12	FW	(Uruguay) URU	Fernando Correa	14	3	1+8	0	4+1	3
15	MF	(South Africa) RSA	Quinton Fortune	6	0	0+3	0	0+3	0
16	MF	(Spain) ESP	De la Sagra	4	1	0+1	0	1+2	1
25	DF	(Brazil) BRA	Iván Rocha	0	0	0	0	0	0
26	GK	(Spain) ESP	Felipe	0	0	0	0	0	0

- Source: BDfutbol.com

=== Left club during season ===
Note: Flags indicate national team as defined under FIFA eligibility rules; some limited exceptions apply. Players may hold more than one non-FIFA nationality.

No.	Pos.	Nation	Player
23	MF	ESP	Dani (to Mallorca)

== See also ==
- Atlético Madrid
- 1995–96 La Liga
- 1995–96 Copa del Rey
