= 1994–95 Atlético Madrid season =

64th season in existence of Atlético Madrid

Atlético Madrid
1994–95 season
- President: Jesús Gil
- Head coach: Francisco Maturana (to November); Jorge D'Alessandro (November to February); Alfio Basile (February to June); Carlos Sánchez Aguiar
- Stadium: Vicente Calderón
- La Liga: 14th
- Copa del Rey: Quarterfinals
- Top goalscorer: League: José Luis Caminero; Kiko (9); All: José Luis Caminero (11)
Home colours	Away colours

The 1994–95 season was Atlético Madrid's 64th season since foundation in 1903 and the club's 60th season in La Liga, the top league of Spanish football. Atlético competed in La Liga and the Copa del Rey.

== Squad ==
Note: Flags indicate national team as defined under FIFA eligibility rules; some limited exceptions apply. Players may hold more than one non-FIFA nationality.

No.	Pos.	Nation	Player
—	GK	ESP	Diego Díaz
—	GK	ESP	Abel Resino
—	DF	ESP	Esteban
—	DF	ESP	Patxi Ferreira
—	DF	ESP	Delfí Geli
—	DF	ESP	Juan Manuel López
—	DF	BRA	Ivan Rocha
—	DF	ESP	Alejandro Sánchez
—	DF	ESP	Roberto Solozábal
—	DF	ESP	Tomás
—	DF	ESP	Toni
—	MF	ESP	José de la Sagra

No.	Pos.	Nation	Player
—	MF	ESP	José Luis Caminero
—	MF	RUS	Igor Dobrovolski
—	MF	ESP	Pirri
—	MF	ESP	Manuel Ruano
—	MF	ARG	Diego Simeone
—	MF	ESP	Juan Vizcaíno
—	FW	ESP	Kiko
—	FW	POL	Roman Kosecki
—	FW	ESP	Manolo
—	FW	ESP	Paulino
—	FW	ESP	Luis Roa
—	FW	COL	Adolfo Valencia

=== Transfers ===
In
Pos.	Name	from	Type
MF	Diego Simeone	Sevilla	€2.50 million
FW	Adolfo Valencia	Bayern Munich	€2.25 million
DF	Ivan Rocha	Real Valladolid	
DF	Delfí Geli	Albacete Balompié	
DF	Patxi Ferreira	Sevilla	loan ended
DF	Esteban	Atlético Marbella	
MF	Igor Dobrovolski	Dynamo Moscow	
DF	Alejandro Sánchez	Atlético Marbella	

Out
Pos.	Name	To	Type
FW	Luis García	Real Sociedad	
MF	Moacir	Corinthians	
FW	Juan Sabas	Real Betis	
MF	José María Quevedo	Real Valladolid	
DF	Pizo Gómez	Osasuna	
DF	Pedro	Sevilla	
DF	Juanito	Sevilla	
FW	Juan Carlos	Atlético Marbella	loan

==== Winter ====
In
Pos.	Name	from	Type
FW	Paulino	Yeclano	
MF	Manuel Ruano	Gramenet	

Out
Pos.	Name	To	Type
MF	Serge Maguy	ASEC Mimosas	
MF	José Ignacio Soler	Osasuna	loan
FW	Miguel Ángel Benítez	Mérida	loan

== Results ==
=== La Liga ===
==== League table ====
Pos	Team	Pld	W	D	L	GF	GA	GD	Pts
12	Racing Santander	38	13	10	15	42	47	−5	36 (Note: CEL 2–1 RAC; RAC 2–0 CEL)
13	Celta Vigo (Note: On July 31, 1995, Sevilla and Celta Vigo were relegated to Segunda División B for not providing documentation (an audit) nor making their payments to the Royal Spanish Football Federation within the time limit. The two best qualified teams to be relegated, Albacete and Valladolid were readmitted to La Liga. Later, Sevilla and Celta Vigo claimed that according to the law they had another 15 working days because they made allegations days before. Finally, the solution was to not relegate any involved team and expand the league to 22 teams for the next two seasons.)	38	11	14	13	36	48	−12	36
14	Atlético Madrid	38	13	9	16	56	54	+2	35 (Note: TEN 1–0 ATM; ATM 3–1 TEN)
15	Tenerife	38	13	9	16	57	57	0	35
16	Compostela	38	11	12	15	44	56	−12	34 (Note: ALB 1–3 COM; COM 0–0 ALB)

Source: LFP
Rules for classification: 1) points; 2) head-to-head points; 3) head-to-head goal difference; 4) head-to-head goals scored; 5) goal difference; 6) number of goals scored.

==== Position by round ====
Round	1	2	3	4	5	6	7	8	9	10	11	12	13	14	15	16	17	18	19	20	21	22	23	24	25	26	27	28	29	30	31	32	33	34	35	36	37	38
Ground	A	H	H	A	H	A	H	A	H	A	H	A	H	A	H	A	H	A	H	H	A	A	H	A	H	A	H	A	H	A	H	A	H	A	H	A	H	A
Result	L	L	W	L	W	L	D	L	L	L	W	D	W	W	L	L	D	L	D	D	W	L	D	W	W	W	L	L	L	D	W	L	W	D	W	L	W	D
Position	16	20	15	12	14	16	15	17	18	19	16	16	15	12	15	18	17	18	18	17	16	17	17	15	14	12	14	16	18	17	15	15	15	14	14	14	13	14

Source: Competitive matches
A = Away; H = Home; W = Win; D = Draw; L = Loss; = Leader, 1995–96 UEFA Champions League Group stage; = 1995–96 UEFA Cup First round; = 1994–95 Relegation playoff to 1995–96 Segunda Division; = 1995–96 Segunda Division; R = 1995–96 UEFA Cup Winners' Cup

==== Matches ====
Win Draw Loss

4 September 1994 1	Atlético	2–4	Valencia CF	Madrid
	Pirri 44'; Caminero 83'	Report	Mijatović 25', 47', 58'; Salenko 49'	Stadium: Vicente Calderón Stadium; Referee: Miguel Marín López

10 September 1994 2	CD Tenerife	1–0	Atlético	Santa Cruz de Tenerife
	Pizzi 38'	Report		Stadium: Estadio Heliodoro Rodríguez López; Referee: José Rubio Valdivieso

18 September 1994 3	Atlético	2–1	Real Sociedad	Madrid
	Kiko 32'; Caminero 48'	Report	44' Pikabea	Stadium: Vicente Calderon; Referee: Juan Ansuátegui Roca

25 September 1994 4	Real Oviedo	1–0	Atlético	Oviedo
	Armando 73'	Report		Stadium: Carlos Tartiere; Referee: Alonso Gómez López

2 October 1994 5	Atlético	6–0	Real Valladolid	Madrid
	Geli 7'; Pirri 18', 30'; Kiko 28', 53', 66'	Report		Stadium: Vicente Calderón Stadium; Referee: Antonio Martin Navarrete

8 October 1994 6	Barcelona	4–3	Atlético	Barcelona
	Romário 10', 77'; Guardiola 33'; Stoichkov 40'	Report	Pirri 25'; Kiko 80'; Valencia 86'	Stadium: Camp Nou; Referee: Juan Ansuátegui Roca

15 October 1994 7	Atlético	1–1	Deportivo La Coruña	Madrid
	Valencia 44'	Report	Kostadinov 53'	Stadium: Vicente Calderón; Referee: José Pajares Paz

22 October 1994 8	RC Celta de Vigo	1–0	Atlético	Vigo
	Losada 14'	Report		Stadium: Balaídos; Referee: Francisco Santamaría Uzqueda

30 October 1994 9	Atlético	0–2	Real Betis	Madrid
		Report	Aquino 34'; Stošić 78'	Stadium: Vicente Calderón Stadium; Referee: Manuel Díaz Vega

5 November 1994 10	Real Madrid CF	4–2	Atlético	Madrid
	Míchel 20' (pen.); Zamorano 25', 43'; Raúl 36'	Report	Kosecki 27'; Simeone 44' (pen.)	Stadium: Santiago Bernabéu Stadium; Referee: Antonio López Nieto

20 November 1994 11	Atlético	3–0	CD Logroñés	Madrid
	Vizcaíno 38'; Valencia 71'; Caminero 75'	Report		Stadium: Vicente Calderón; Referee: Gonzalo Panadero Martínez

27 November 1994 12	Albacete Balompié	2–2	Atlético	Albacete
	Santi 25'; Cordero 39'	Report	Kiko 67'; Caminero 71'	Stadium: Carlos Belmonte; Referee: Celino Gracia Redondo

3 December 1994 13	Atlético	2–1	Athletic Bilbao	Madrid
	Simeone 36', 65'	Report	Goikoetxea 64'	Stadium: Vicente Calderón Stadium; Referee: Carmelo Rodríguez Martel

11 December 1994 14	Sporting de Gijón	0–2	Atlético	Gijón
		Report	Caminero 8'; Simeone 56'	Stadium: El Molinón; Referee: José Andradas Asurmendi

21 December 1994 15	Atlético	0–1	Racing Santander	Madrid
		Report	Popov 21'	Stadium: Vicente Calderón; Referee: Antonio Martin Navarrete

8 January 1995 16	Español	2–0	Atlético	Barcelona
	Răducioiu 4', 78'	Report		Stadium: Sarrià Stadium; Referee: Miguel Marín López

15 January 1995 17	Atlético	1–1	SD Compostela	Madrid
	Valencia 40'	Report	Abadía 30'	Stadium: Vicente Calderón Stadium; Referee: José Andradas Asurmendi

22 January 1995 18	Real Zaragoza	3–1	Atlético	Zaragoza
	Higuera 20' (pen.); Esnáider 41'; Pardeza 89'	Report	Kiko 67'	Stadium: La Romareda; Referee: Francisco Santamaría Uzqueda

29 January 1995 19	Atlético	2–2	Sevilla FC	Madrid
	Manolo 40'; Sánchez 75'	Report	Bango 9'; Šuker 68'	Stadium: Vicente Calderón; Referee: José Rubio Valdivieso

5 February 1995 20	Valencia CF	0–0	Atlético	Valencia
		Report		Stadium: Mestalla; Referee: Gonzalo Panadero Martínez

11 February 1995 21	Atlético	3–1	CD Tenerife	Madrid
	Caminero 16'; Geli 73'; Valencia 87'	Report	51' Miñambres	Stadium: Vicente Calderón Stadium; Referee: Juan Fernández Marín

19 February 1995 22	Real Sociedad	3–1	Atlético	San Sebastián
	Karpin 26', 88'; Pérez 81'	Report	Caminero 28'	Stadium: Anoeta Stadium; Referee: Juan Brito Arceo

26 February 1995 23	Atlético	3–3	Real Oviedo	Madrid
	Geli 28'; Simeone 54'; Vizcaíno 89'	Report	Oli 32'; Carlos 51'; Prosinečki 72' (pen.)	Stadium: Vicente Calderón Stadium; Referee: Carmelo Rodríguez Martel

5 March 1995 24	Real Valladolid	0–1	Atlético	Valladolid
		Report	Belodedici 77' (o.g.)	Stadium: Estadio José Zorrilla; Referee: José Pajares Paz

11 March 1995 25	Atlético	2–0	Barcelona	Madrid
	Rocha 44' (pen.), 51'	Report		Stadium: Vicente Calderón Stadium; Referee: Manuel Díaz Vega

18 March 1995 26	Deportivo La Coruña	0–1	Atlético	A Coruña
		Report	Manolo 68'	Stadium: Estadio Riazor; Referee: Juan Ansuátegui Roca

2 April 1995 27	Atlético	0–2	Celta Vigo	Madrid
		Report	Hoyas 30'; Gudelj 89'	Stadium: Vicente Calderón Stadium; Referee: Alonso Gómez López

8 April 1995 28	Real Betis	2–0	Atlético	Seville
	Márquez 60'; Trujillo 63' (pen.)	Report		Stadium: Estadio Benito Villamarín; Referee: Arturo Daudén Ibáñez

15 April 1995 29	Atlético	0–2	Real Madrid	Madrid
		Report	Zamorano 30', 71'	Stadium: Vicente Calderón Stadium; Referee: Juan Fernández Marín

23 April 1995 30	Logroñés	0–0	Atlético	Logroño
		Report		Stadium: Estadio Las Gaunas; Referee: José Rubio Valdivieso

30 April 1995 31	Atlético	4–0	Albacete Balompié	Madrid
	Caminero 25'; Kosecki 64', 82'; Geli 69'	Report		Stadium: Vicente Calderón Stadium; Referee: Celino Gracia Redondo

7 May 1995 32	Athletic Bilbao	3–1	Atlético	Bilbao
	Alkiza 17'; Tabuenka 69'; Ziganda 71'	Report	Pirri 16'	Stadium: San Mamés Stadium; Referee: Francisco Santamaría Uzqueda

14 May 1995 33	Atlético	3–2	Sporting de Gijón	Madrid
	Kosecki 11'; Kiko 62'; Dobrovolski 83'	Report	Pier 58'; Morales 65'	Stadium: Vicente Calderón Stadium; Referee: Juan Ansuátegui Roca

21 May 1995 34	Racing Santander	0–0	Atlético	Santander
		Report		Stadium: Campos de Sport de El Sardinero; Referee: José Rubio Valdivieso

28 May 1995 35	Atlético	3–1	Español	Madrid
	López 27'; Geli 57' (pen.); Caminero 88'	Report	Arteaga 28'	Stadium: Vicente Calderón Stadium; Referee: Arturo Daudén Ibáñez

4 June 1995 36	SD Compostela	2–1	Atlético	Santiago de Compostela
	Ohen 47'; Christensen 65'	Report	Valencia 79'	Stadium: Estadio Multiusos de San Lázaro; Referee: Juan Fernández Marín

11 June 1995 37	Atlético	2–0	Zaragoza	Madrid
	Geli 23' (pen.); Manolo 89'	Report		Stadium: Vicente Calderón Stadium; Referee: José Andradas Asurmendi

18 June 1995 38	Sevilla FC	2–2	Atlético	Seville
	Šuker 58'; Monchu 78'	Report	Kiko 21'; Simeone 31'	Stadium: Sánchez Pizjuán; Referee: Juan Brito Arceo

=== Copa del Rey ===
==== Third round ====
4 January 1995 First leg	Mensajero	0–0	Atlético Madrid	Santa Cruz de La Palma
		Report		Stadium: Nuevo Estadio Silvestre Carrillo; Referee: Carmelo Rodríguez Martel

10 January 1995 Second leg	Atlético Madrid	3–1 (3–1 agg.)	Mensajero	Madrid
	Caminero 24'; Geli 75'; Pirri 85'	Report	Engonga 56'	Stadium: Vicente Calderón Stadium; Referee: César Barrenechea Montero

==== Fourth round ====
25 January 1995 First leg	Las Palmas	0–0	Atlético Madrid	Las Palmas
		Report		Stadium: Estadio Insular; Referee: Antonio Martin Navarrete

1 February 1995 Second leg	Atlético Madrid	2–0 (2–0 agg.)	Las Palmas	Madrid
	Simeone 55'; Padrón 72' (o.g.)	Report		Stadium: Vicente Calderón Stadium; Referee: Celino Gracia Redondo

==== Round of 16 ====
7 February 1995 First leg	Barcelona	1–4	Atlético Madrid	Barcelona
20:30	Abelardo 2'	Report	Simeone 13' (pen.); Valencia 53', 90'; Pirri 68'	Stadium: Camp Nou; Attendance: 60,000; Referee: Manuel Díaz Vega

14 February 1995 Second leg	Atlético Madrid	1–3 (5–4 agg.)	Barcelona	Madrid
20:30	Caminero 45'	Report	Hagi 9'; Stoichkov 49', 56'	Stadium: Vicente Calderón Stadium; Attendance: 55,000; Referee: Arturo Daudén Ibáñez

==== Quarter-finals ====
7 March 1995 First leg	Atlético Madrid	1–1	Albacete Balompié	Madrid
20:30	Rocha 5'	Report	López 77'	Stadium: Vicente Calderón Stadium; Attendance: 20,000; Referee: César Barrenechea Montero

23 March 1995 Second leg	Albacete Balompié	1–0 (2–1 agg.)	Atlético Madrid	Albacete
20:30	Bjelica 85'	Report		Stadium: Estadio Carlos Belmonte; Referee: Juan Brito Arceo

== Squad statistics ==
=== Appearances and goals ===
No.	Pos	Nat	Player	Total		La Liga		Copa del Rey	
No.	Pos	Nat	Player	Apps	Goals	Apps	Goals	Apps	Goals
	GK	(Spain) ESP	Abel	30	0	23	0	7	0
	DF	(Spain) ESP	Geli	44	7	33+3	6	6+2	1
	DF	(Spain) ESP	Tomás	32	0	21+4	0	7	0
	DF	(Spain) ESP	Juanma Lopez	27	1	24	1	2+1	0
	DF	(Spain) ESP	Solozabal	39	0	28+4	0	7	0
	DF	(Spain) ESP	Toni	39	0	34	0	5	0
	MF	(Argentina) ARG	Simeone	37	8	29	6	8	2
	MF	(Spain) ESP	Vizcaino	35	2	29	2	6	0
	MF	(Spain) ESP	Caminero	36	11	31	9	5	2
	FW	(Spain) ESP	Kiko	33	9	30	9	3	0
	FW	(Poland) POL	Kosecki	30	4	22+4	4	4	0
	GK	(Spain) ESP	Diego Díaz	17	0	15	0	1+1	0
	DF	(Spain) ESP	Patxi Ferreira	27	0	19+3	0	5	0
	MF	(Spain) ESP	Pirri	26	7	17+4	5	4+1	2
	FW	(Spain) ESP	Manolo	32	3	16+9	3	6+1	0
	FW	(Colombia) COL	Valencia	30	8	15+9	6	4+2	2
	DF	(Brazil) BRA	Ivan Rocha	15	3	12+1	2	2	1
	MF	(Russia) RUS	Dobrovolski	22	1	11+8	1	1+2	0
	MF	(Spain) ESP	Sánchez	11	1	4+4	1	3	0
	MF	(Spain) ESP	de la Sagra	2	0	2	0	0	0
	MF	(Spain) ESP	Ruano	12	0	1+8	0	1+2	0
	MF	(Spain) ESP	Soler	1	0	1	0	0	0
	FW	(Paraguay) PAR	Benitez	3	0	1+2	0	0	0
	DF	(Spain) ESP	Esteban	0	0	0	0	0	0
	FW	(Spain) ESP	Paulino	5	0	0+3	0	1+1	0
	FW	(Spain) ESP	Roa	2	0	0	0	0+2	0

=== Disciplinary record ===
Rank	Nat.	Pos.	Name	La Liga			Copa del Rey			Total		
Rank	Nat.	Pos.	Name	Booked	(yellow card) (yellow-red card)	Sent off (straight red)	Booked	(yellow card) (yellow-red card)	Sent off (straight red)	Booked	(yellow card) (yellow-red card)	Sent off (straight red)
1	(Spain)	DF	Juan Manuel López	8	1	2	1	0	1	9	1	3
2	(Spain)	DF	José Luis Caminero	9	0	1	2	0	0	11	0	1
3	(Spain)	FW	Kiko	8	2	0	0	0	0	8	2	0
4	(Spain)	DF	Tomás	4	0	1	1	0	1	5	0	2
4	(Poland)	FW	Roman Kosecki	5	1	1	1	0	0	6	1	1
4	(Spain)	MF	Pirri	6	2	0	1	0	0	7	2	0
4	(Spain)	DF	Patxi Ferreira	7	0	0	4	0	0	11	0	0
8	(Spain)	DF	Toni	8	1	0	0	0	0	8	1	0
8	(Argentina)	MF	Diego Simeone	7	0	0	3	0	0	10	0	0
10	(Spain)	DF	Delfí Geli	4	1	0	1	0	0	5	1	0
10	(Brazil)	DF	Ivan Rocha	5	0	0	2	0	0	7	0	0
12	(Spain)	DF	Roberto Solozábal	5	0	0	1	0	0	6	0	0
13	(Colombia)	FW	Adolfo Valencia	5	0	0	0	0	0	5	0	0
13	(Spain)	MF	Juan Vizcaíno	4	0	0	1	0	0	5	0	0
15	(Russia)	MF	Igor Dobrovolski	2	1	0	0	0	0	2	1	0
15	(Spain)	FW	Manolo	3	0	0	1	0	0	4	0	0
16	(Spain)	MF	Manuel Ruano	3	0	0	0	0	0	3	0	0
17	(Spain)	GK	Abel Resino	0	0	0	0	1	0	0	1	0
17	(Spain)	MF	José de la Sagra	2	0	0	0	0	0	2	0	0
17	(Spain)	GK	Diego Díaz	2	0	0	0	0	0	2	0	0
20	(Spain)	FW	Paulino	0	0	0	1	0	0	1	0	0
20	(Spain)	DF	Alejandro Sánchez	1	0	0	0	0	0	1	0	0
