= Radomir Antić =

Serbian footballer and manager (1948–2020)

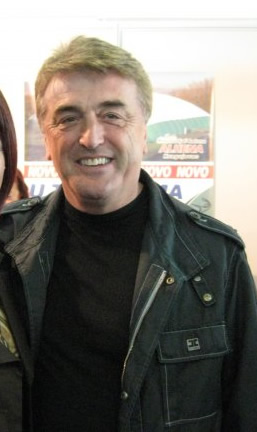
- Antić in 2009

Personal information
- Date of birth: 22 November 1948
- Place of birth: Žitište, PR Serbia, FPR Yugoslavia
- Date of death: 6 April 2020 (aged 71)
- Place of death: Madrid, Spain
- Position: Defender

Senior career*
Years	Team	Apps	(Gls)
1967–1970	Sloboda Titovo Užice	84	(9)
1970–1977	Partizan	181	(9)
1977–1978	Fenerbahçe	28	(2)
1978–1980	Zaragoza	58	(7)
1980–1984	Luton Town	100	(9)
Total		451	(36)

International career
1973	Yugoslavia	1	(0)

Managerial career
- 1985–1988: Partizan (assistant)
- 1988–1990: Zaragoza
- 1991–1992: Real Madrid
- 1992–1995: Real Oviedo
- 1995–1998: Atlético Madrid
- 1999: Atlético Madrid
- 2000: Atlético Madrid
- 2000–2001: Real Oviedo
- 2003: Barcelona
- 2004: Celta Vigo
- 2008–2010: Serbia
- 2012–2013: Shandong Luneng
- 2015: Hebei Zhongji
- * Club domestic league appearances and goals

Radomir Antić (Serbian Cyrillic: Радомир Антић, pronounced [rǎdomiːr âːntitɕ]; 22 November 1948 – 6 April 2020) was a Serbian professional football manager and player.

Following a 17-year playing career as a defender, most of which he spent playing at Partizan, with whom he won the Yugoslav First League, Antić moved into coaching.

He was one of only two men to have managed both Barcelona and Real Madrid, long-time bitter rivals (the other one is Enrique Fernández Viola). With Atlético Madrid, Antić won the double, conquering both La Liga and the Copa del Rey in the 1995–96 season. He is the only man to have coached Barcelona, Real Madrid, and Atletico Madrid.

== Early life ==
Antić was born in Žitište to a Serb family (father Jovo Antić from the Janj area near Šipovo and mother Milka Brkić from the Grmeč region) that had settled in the small Banat town shortly before his birth. Born as the second son in the family, Radomir had an older brother Dragomir, two years his senior. The newborn was named after his maternal uncle Radomir "Rade" Brkić, a notable World War II Partisan guerrilla fighter who, in 1953, would be awarded the Order of the People's Hero gallantry medal for the engagement.

During the mid-1950s, when young Radomir was six years old, the family moved to Titovo Užice, a city where Antić grew up and considered to be his hometown. After the family's arrival to Titovo Užice, another child, daughter Mira, was born.

== Playing career ==
Antić started his playing career with Sloboda Titovo Užice (1967–1970) and then moved to the club where he would play most of his career, Partizan (1970–1977). With Partizan, he won the national Championship in 1976.

In the summer of 1977, Antić signed for Fenerbahçe in Turkey. He spent one season in Istanbul before moving to the Spanish La Liga, where he played for Real Zaragoza.

In 1980, Antić moved on to Luton Town, a team in England's Second Division (which was then the second tier). Known in England as "Raddy", he helped Luton to the Second Division title in 1982, and stayed with the club for two seasons in the top division before leaving in 1984. At the end of the 1982–83 season, he played a key role in saving Luton from relegation, scoring a winning goal four minutes from time in the final League match of the season, away against Manchester City. City, the home team, were themselves relegated as a result. At full-time, Luton manager David Pleat ran across the pitch, hopping and waving his arms wildly in celebration.

Already in his 30s when he arrived at Luton, Antić already looked to coaching as a career option once his playing days are finished. While an active player in England, he enrolled in and completed the coaching college in Belgrade, Viša trenerska škola. In that regard, he often cites Pleat as an influence on his later coaching style.

After helping save Luton's First Division status, Antić spent one more season at Kenilworth Road before retiring at age 36.

Antić made one appearance for the Yugoslavia national team, appearing as a substitute in the 80th minute for injured Franjo Vladić (who himself came on as a sub for Vladimir Petrović Pižon some 18 minutes prior) in a friendly against Hungary on 26 September 1973 in Belgrade.

== Managerial career ==
=== Early career ===
After finishing his playing career at age 36, Antić started a career in coaching as an assistant with Partizan (1985–87), working under head coach Nenad Bjeković. Partizan won the 1985–86 league title amid a match-fixing controversy. They also won the 1986–87 league.

In early July 1987, Fahrudin Jusufi was brought in as the new head coach and initially Antić continued his assistant role. For the pre-season training ahead of the 1987–88 season, the team went abroad where Jusufi and Antić got into a row over player personnel issues that resulted in Antić being essentially demoted to the position of Partizan under-16 youth team (cadet squad) coach.

=== Real Zaragoza ===
Antić's first head coaching position was with Real Zaragoza. In addition to formerly playing for the club, his appointment owed a lot to being recommended for the job by countryman Vujadin Boškov, who had been successfully leading the Italian side Sampdoria at the time while also enjoying a lot of clout in Spain having led Zaragoza (coached Antić there for two years) and other La Liga clubs during the late 1970s and early 1980s.

The squad was a fairly modest one without any really big names; the most notable players being the aging Spanish international midfielder Juan Señor and forward Miguel Pardeza who came up through Real Madrid's youth system as part of La Quinta del Buitre generation. The biggest summer signing was twenty-six-year-old striker Nasko Sirakov from Levski Sofia who had joined shortly before Antić's arrival. The club also had some young assets: a pair of twenty-two-year-olds Francisco Villarroya and Juan Vizcaíno who were well on their way to becoming future Spanish internationals as well as eccentric Paraguayan goalie José Luis Chilavert who came to the club from Argentina's San Lorenzo the same summer Antić did. Antić's made his La Liga coaching debut on 4 September 1988 against Valencia, a 0–0 draw. The initial period was rough, with the club hovering in and around the relegation zone, followed by a period of slight improvement, but still stuck in the lower half of the table. The sudden and somewhat unexpected breakthrough came during last eight league matches of the season as Antić's Zaragoza started posting win after win in a rapid climb up the table, finishing the season in fifth place, thus qualifying for the UEFA Cup.

He ended up spending two full seasons (1988–1990) managing a club he also turned out for as a player.

=== Real Madrid ===
Real Madrid came calling in late March 1991 and Antić took over from club legend Alfredo Di Stéfano following los Merengues' elimination from the European Cup by Oleg Romantsev's Spartak Moscow at the quarter-final stage. Di Stéfano had been on thin ice since the 1–0 league defeat in mid-March away to mid-table Logroñés (Real Madrid's third league loss in a row), but it was the 1–3 return leg quarter-final European Cup home loss against the Russians at the Santiago Bernabéu on 20 March 1991 that served as the last straw that prompted Di Stéfano's removal. In La Liga, at the time, after 26 matches, the club occupied the seventh position in the standings.

Used to winning major trophies, the royal club was in turmoil with Antić coming in as their third head coach of the season after John Toshack and Di Stéfano.

==== 1990–91: Stopping the bleeding ====
After Di Stefano's sacking, Ramón Grosso took over the head coaching reigns on an interim basis for a few days while the club negotiated terms with Antić. Grosso ended up leading the team in only one match, the league contest at home versus against Real Oviedo on 24 March 1991 that ended in a somewhat disappointing 1–1 draw considering Oviedo played with ten men since the 68th minute.

With Emilio Butragueño, Míchel, Fernando Hierro, Manolo Sanchís, Gheorghe Hagi, and the aging Hugo Sánchez as the club's established stars, Antić's debut took place on 31 March 1991 at the Bernabéu with a 0–1 home loss to mid-table Real Burgos, a disappointing way to start his tenure at the club. The rest of the squad Antić found at his disposal included compatriot Predrag Spasić in central defence, defensive stalwart Chendo, central defender Jesús Solana, defensive midfielder Rafael Gordillo, midfielder Francisco Villarroya whom Antić had previously coached at Zaragoza, etc. Still, the league situation would get downright critical the week after as Madrid was beaten 3–1 away at Luis Aragonés' relegation-battling Espanyol by conceding two late goals, dropping los Merengues to the 10th spot in La Liga. After only two league matches, Antić was feeling the full pressure of the Real hotseat.

Things finally started clicking with a 4–0 home win versus Valencia on 14 April 1991, which started a five-match winning streak. The 3–3 away draw at Osasuna ended the streak, but the team quickly put together another three-match winning run to end the season. On 8 June 1991, the season ended on a high note with a 1–0 home win against champions-elect Barcelona in El Clásico. In total, Antić led Real in the final 11 league matches (8 wins, 1 draw and 2 losses) of the 1990–91 season, improving Real's standing to third in the league, and qualifying for the UEFA Cup.

==== 1991–92: Success and sacking ====
During the 1991 summer transfer window, Antić brought in Robert Prosinečki, prominent member of the Red Star Belgrade's 1991 European Cup-winning side, as well as promising 21-year-old Luis Enrique from Sporting de Gijón.

Antić's team began the season in furious fashion with five straight league wins, grabbing the La Liga top spot ahead of El Clásico on 19 October 1991. Playing Johan Cruyff's Barça "dream team" at home at the Bernabéu, Real went ahead via a Prosinečki first half free-kick, one shining moment in the highly rated signing's otherwise disastrous season, before Ronald Koeman equalized courtesy of a second half penalty shot. Real's winning streak in the league had thus been broken, however, with the very next league match, a 3–0 home win over Logroñés, los Merengues commenced another winning streak, this time recording seven straight league wins as they tangibly separated themselves from the pack of chasers atop the La Liga standings.

One player especially excelled under Antić: twenty-three-year-old Hierro, normally a defender, was moved up further into midfield and responded by scoring in numbers, eventually ending the season on 21 league goals, the greatest single-season offensive output of his career. The second winning streak in the league ended with a draw away at Zaragoza in mid-December 1991. This was followed by a slight dip in form as Real recorded another draw the following week at home against Oviedo, before experiencing its first league loss of the season away at cross-town rivals Atlético Madrid, though still retaining top league spot by a comfortable margin. During this three-match period without a league win, club president Ramón Mendoza opted to bring Leo Beenhakker into the organization in a vaguely defined sporting director role, though Antić remained the team's head coach. The three-match winless streak ended with an emphatic 5–2 win at home versus Osasuna, but was then followed by the second league loss of the season when Guus Hiddink's Valencia managed to overturn Real's 0–1 lead with two late goals and record a famous home win over the league leaders. Although Antić's team quickly got back on winning track with a 2–1 home win against Tenerife on 26 January 1992, the forty-three-year-old coach was terminated. At the time of Antić's termination, 19 league matches into the season, Madrid was holding the top spot in La Liga by a seven-point margin and was also smoothly through to the UEFA Cup quarter-finals, having eliminated Slovan Bratislava, Utrecht, and Neuchâtel Xamax in the previous rounds. Information leaked to the club-adjacent media cited the team's play under Antić supposedly not being sufficiently attractive as the reason for the sack.

Led by Beenhakker, Real Madrid squandered its seven-point lead, losing the title to bitter rivals Barcelona on the last matchday of the season. Madrid were also eliminated from UEFA Cup by Torino in the semi-finals.

In an interview two decades later, Antić revealed that Real's club president Mendoza later privately apologized to him for "running me out of the club with the accompanying media campaign of accusations of playing 'ugly football'".

=== Real Oviedo ===
Antić was hired to coach Real Oviedo when the club's brass fired previous longtime coach Javier Irureta after matchday 19 of the 1992–93 season, with the club dangerously close to the relegation zone in 16th spot and a one match stint of caretaker Julio Marigil Marín. Antić took over from matchday 21 and completed the season with the club, managing to avoid relegation by finishing two spots above the relegation zone. He remained at the club for two additional seasons.

During the 1993 summer transfer window, Antić signed Slaviša Jokanović from Partizan, whose midfield presence greatly helped the squad. The expectations at Oviedo were obviously much more modest compared to Real Madrid, with mere top league survival being the main goal. It was therefore no small surprise that a very low budget Antić-led Oviedo team finished the 1993–94 league season in ninth place.

Antić's most notable signing at Oviedo came before the start of 1994–95 season when he brought often injured Robert Prosinečki from Real Madrid, thus reuniting with a player he first signed to Madrid. Oviedo again finished the La Liga season in respectable ninth position, missing a European spot by mere points.

=== Atlético Madrid ===
Antić's greatest coaching successes are tied to Atlético Madrid, a club he ended up coaching in three separate stints.

His achievements with transforming Oviedo's fortunes led to offers from bigger Spanish clubs. Despite having been in final stages of the negotiations with Valencia with even a pre-contract signed, Antić opted to take the offer by Atlético club president Jesús Gil, leading to the Serb's first engagement with the club that ended up lasting three seasons (1995–98). The squad he took over during summer 1995 was a talented one featuring the quality core of José Luis Caminero, Kiko Narváez and Diego Simeone, but with a reputation of continuous underachievement. In the season prior to his arrival, the club finished one point above relegation zone by earning a 2–2 draw versus Sevilla on the last matchday of the season.

==== 1995–96: Double title ====
Out of the 35-player squad he inherited, Antić quickly identified 20 players he was counting on for the upcoming season before setting about adding five to six more players during the transfer window. That meant the end of Atlético days for a slew of players including aging goalie Abel Resino, embattled Colombian striker Adolfo Valencia, Brazilian Iván Rocha, Polish striker Roman Kosecki, and Russian winger Igor Dobrovolski, among others.

However, Antić would experience difficulty getting the players he's interested in to sign for Atlético for a variety of reasons. First on his wish list was defender Viktor Onopko from Spartak Moscow: Atlético and the player agreed terms, however, Oviedo management—who were also after the twenty-six-year-old Russian's signature—protested and the case ended up before a FIFA arbitration commission, which ruled in Oviedo's favour. Antić then tried to sign Fernando Morientes from Albacete, but the talented nineteen-year-old striker instead ended up signing with Zaragoza. Antić was also after Robert Prosinečki—the talented twenty-six-year-old midfield creator he had brought to Real Madrid four year earlier in 1991 and had just coached in Oviedo where also Antić brought him on loan from Real—with the player receptive to joining los Colchoneros and Atlético even reaching an agreement with Real whom Prosinečki was still contracted to. However, Johan Cruyff's Barcelona stepped in and presented Prosinečki's agent Zoran Vekić with a three-year plus two years optional €3 million offer, which Prosinečki accepted thus rejecting Atlético.

Out of the players Antić did manage to sign, the biggest find turned out to be unheralded winger Milinko Pantić, whom Antić plucked from obscurity in Panionios for very little money. The move initially raised eyebrows with many questioning the usefulness of a complete unknown who is about to turn 29 years of age, however over the coming season, Pantić would prove himself to be the missing piece this team needed with key goals and assists. Another key acquisition was the twenty-nine-year-old Bulgarian tall centre forward Luboslav Penev, brought in from Valencia despite questions about his health due to a recent bout with testicular cancer. Other incoming transfers included goalkeeper José Francisco Molina and central defender Santi Denia from Albacete, midfielder Roberto Fresnedoso from Espanyol and young Argentine striker Leo Biagini from Newell's Old Boys, who starred at the 1995 FIFA World Youth Championship.

Playing in La Liga that had just expanded from 20 to 22 teams along with a new points system with three points awarded for a win, under Antić's command, the Atlético squad featuring Molina in goal, Delfí Geli and Santi Denia in central defence, Roberto Solozábal and Toni on right and left back respectively, Juan Vizcaíno (whom Antić previously coached at Zaragoza) and Caminero in centre midfield, Simeone and Pantić on right and left wing respectively, and finally Penev and Kiko upfront gelled together masterfully en route to a historic La Liga/Copa del Rey double in the 1995–96 season. Other players that didn't start as often, but nevertheless contributed significantly throughout the season were Roberto Fresnedoso, Juan Manuel López, Biagini, Pirri Mori, etc.

Antić's Atlético began the league campaign in furious fashion with four impressive wins. Once they took the top league spot after week 2, los Colchoneros gave it up only once (after the week 5 scoreless draw at Sevilla), before reclaiming it the very next week and impressively continuing on top until the end with Penev scoring 16 league goals, Simeone 12, Kiko 11, Pantić 10, and Caminero 9. Atlético also featured a stingy defence that allowed 32 goals – less than any other team in the league. Still, the title wasn't secure until the very last week of fixtures, as Luis Aragonés' Valencia led by the Yugoslav striker Predrag Mijatović stayed in close pursuit until the end. Going into the last round of matches on Saturday 25 May 1996, Atlético was on 84 points with Alabacete to play at home while Valencia had 82 and Celta away. The victory was never in doubt as Simeone and Kiko scored in the first half sparking off jubilant scenes at the Vicente Calderón Stadium.

Month and a half earlier Antić already claimed his first trophy of the season, beating Johan Cruyff's Barça in the Copa del Rey final in Zaragoza after extra time on a goal by Pantić.

Following the win of two titles, Antić remained the coach of Atlético Madrid under president Jesús Gil for three consecutive seasons. This tenure occurred during a period where the club frequently changed coaches.

==== 1996–97: Champions League participation ====
During the 1996 summer transfer window, the squad upgrade was in order ahead of the 1996–97 season that saw Atlético compete in the Champions League in addition to defending the La Liga title.

As replacement for aging Luboslav Penev, who was impressive during the double title season despite simultaneously recovering and also as general statement of intent for the coming season, Atlético was in the market for a marquee forward. Antić wanted to bring in promising 19-year-old Brazilian striker Ronaldo from PSV and pushed hard within the club hierarchy for that to be done. However, he ultimately got overruled by higher instances and Ronaldo signed with Barcelona about a month later. Instead, Atlético acquired 23-year-old Argentine striker Juan Esnáider from Real Madrid. Another big acquisition was 24-year-old Czech defensive midfielder Radek Bejbl from Slavia Prague, who was coming off a great showing at UEFA Euro 1996 where Czechs finished runners-up. The arrival of Bejbl meant that 30-year-old Vizcaíno lost his starting spot in defensive midfield.

Simultaneously playing on two difficult fronts proved to be much more demanding and the team quickly started lagging behind Real and Barcelona in La Liga, while in the Champions League they progressed to the quarter-finals on top of the group featuring Borussia Dortmund, Widzew Łódź and Steaua București. In the second part of the league campaign, Atlético somewhat steadied its form but was unable to make up the minus from early part of the season. Back in the Champions League knockout stage, the quarter-final clash against Ajax turned into an epic battle with tensions often spilling outside the pitch like when Jesús Gil publicly referred to Ajax as "FC Congo" due to the large number of black players of African and Surinamese origin on their team. Atlético achieved a great 1–1 result away as Esnáider scored a header after fine work from Delfí Geli on the right. The return leg in Madrid was a tense affair that saw los Colchoneros go up through Kiko in the first half before Ronald de Boer equalized just after halftime. With the score tied at one a piece and the match heading into extra-time, Antić decided to put Biagini on instead of Esnáider who was not pleased about the substitution and got into a vicious shouting match with the coach as he exited the pitch. Ten minutes into the extra period, Ajax's Portuguese forward Dani scored on a beautiful effort for 1–2, which meant that due to away-goals, Atlético would now have to score twice more to go through. Within five minutes they got a penalty, which Pantić converted, but couldn't manage one more goal despite attacking in waves for the remaining fifteen minutes. Due to Atlético's all out attack, Ajax even scored a third goal on the quick counter-attack through Tijani Babangida.

==== 1997–98: Heavy spending ====
Ahead of the 1997–98 season, Gil invested heavily into the team, bringing twenty-four-year-old Italian superstar striker Christian Vieri fresh from winning the Serie A title and reaching Champions League final with Juventus. He also bought crafty twenty-five-year-old Brazilian Juninho from Middlesbrough for £12 million. In order to somewhat offset the costs, inspirational midfielder Diego Simeone was sold to Internazionale. Naturally the expectations were high, with spotlight especially focused on expensive new signings. Though both struggled with injuries causing them to miss significant chunk of the season, Vieri still managed to produce excellent form when fit to play with 24 goals in 24 league appearances, while Juninho struggled to make similar impact with only 6 goals in 23 league appearances. When Atletico started sputtering in La Liga, the rumblings about Antić's possible dismissal were heard for the first time. When Atlético got eliminated by Lazio at the UEFA Cup semi-final stage, Gil launched into an obscenity-laced tirade against Spanish television for reporting he has lined up an Italian coach to replace Antić.

In the end, that is exactly what happened as he was let go at season's end during the summer of 1998 to make way for Arrigo Sacchi.

=== Return to Atlético ===
Antić, however, would not be away from Atlético for long, as Sacchi got sacked midway through 1998–99 season after matchday 22, and following a five-match stint of caretaker coach Carlos Sánchez Aguiar, the Serb returned for a second spell that lasted from matchday 28 until the end of the season (11 league matches). With Atlético clinging to lowly 13th spot in league standings when Antić returned, the repeat of league success proved elusive as the team recorded three wins, four losses and four draws under his command to finish the season in the same 13th place.

Antić, however, managed to inspire the team to the 1999 Copa del Rey final with a scrappy semifinal win over Javier Irureta's Deportivo La Coruña. In the final match at the newly opened La Cartuja Stadium in Seville, they lost heavily to Claudio Ranieri's Valencia, 0–3.

Antić was again let go at season's end, and eventually replaced with Ranieri.

=== Third time at Atlético ===
Antić's third stint at the club began in February 2000 during the latter part of 1999–2000 season under difficult circumstances. Following Ranieri's dismissal after league matchday 26 with the club in administration due to accumulated debts, Antić took over a squad already in a tailspin, sitting in 17th league spot barely hovering above relegation zone.

Antić's third arrival to the club ahead of matchday 27 did little to change matters as Atlético lost on his return, falling back into the relegation zone and never coming out of it until the end of the season. Despite the goalscoring exploits of Jimmy Floyd Hasselbaink, they were eliminated from 1999–2000 UEFA Cup at the eight-final stage by Lens, but relegation from La Liga several months later came as the most painful blow of all. Antić was terminated after matchday 37 after Atlético was already relegated with one league match left in the season; for the final match, the team was coached by Fernando Zambrano.

Making the Copa del Rey final for the second consecutive season came as one spot in an otherwise disastrous season, but even that was not to be as they were beaten to the trophy by Espanyol.

=== Return to Real Oviedo ===
Antić returned to Real Oviedo in the summer of 2000. His team suffered their first relegation for 13 years, and he was sacked on 6 July 2001.

=== Barcelona ===
After taking a year-and-a-half-long break from coaching, Antić took over Barcelona mid-season in late January 2003 on club president Joan Gaspart's initiative following the sacking of Louis van Gaal. Antić took the reins with the team occupying the 15th spot in La Liga standings with only 23 points from 20 league matches (six wins, five draws and nine losses), but well placed in the Champions League second phase with two wins from as many matches. The club's league position was so weak that mere top-flight survival was put forth as Antić's immediate goal. On the other hand, in Champions League, the expectations were substantial. Some press outlets reported that his six-month €600,000 contract with Barça was incentive-based, stipulating an automatic one-year extension at the end of the season if the club qualifies for the following season's Champions League based on the domestic league finish (top-four).

Antić immediately brought in Juan Pablo Sorín from Lazio. He also started giving regular first team appearances to young goalkeeper Víctor Valdés as well as throwing another youngster, Andrés Iniesta, into the first team. Additionally, Antić moved Xavi further up the field, just behind the line of forwards, thus freeing him up from the defensive duties he had under Van Gaal, which allowed the diminutive midfielder to fully showcase his creativity.

Antić managed to stabilize the squad and lead it to a sixth-place Liga finish, ensuring UEFA Cup qualification. His record with the club in the season since taking over was nine wins, six draws and three losses. In the Champions League, under Antić, Barça dominated their group in the Second Group Stage throughout February and early March, which gave the team a much needed confidence boost for the rest of the season on all fronts. In fact, just his third match in charge of Barça was an important Champions League clash at home versus Inter Milan that the Catalans ended up winning 3–0, thus marking the coach's return to the Champions League after six years and also extending the team's win streak to 11 consecutive Champions League matches, breaking the previous record by A.C. Milan. Antić's Barcelona, however, lost in extra time of the quarter-final to Marcello Lippi's Juventus.

On 23 June 2003, it was announced by new club president Joan Laporta that the optional second year in Antić's contract would not be activated, and Frank Rijkaard was appointed in his place.

=== Celta Vigo ===
On 29 January 2004, Antić succeeded Miguel Ángel Lotina at a Celta Vigo side one point and one place above the relegation places. He lost 1–0 away to Real Betis on his debut. Following this match in which he felt Celta deserved a more positive result, Antić identified overturning the loss of self-confidence among some of his players due to club's weak league position as his biggest challenge.

Exactly two months after his hiring, Antić quit Celta, who were now second from bottom. He took seven points from his nine league games, and was eliminated from the Champions League last 16 by Arsenal.

=== Serbia national team ===
On 19 August 2008, following reported two-day contract negotiations with the Serbian Football Association (FSS), Antić was announced as the new Serbia head coach, six days before being officially presented at the FSS headquarters on 25 August. The appointment marked fifty-nine-year-old Antić's return to coaching after four years and, according to both Antić and FSS president Tomislav Karadžić, the negotiations concluded quickly after Antić's main request of bringing in his own coaching staff led by long-time assistant Rešad Kunovac was accepted. Along with a €500,000 bonus incentive tied to the 2010 FIFA World Cup qualification, Antić's annual salary was reported to be in the €305,000—325,000 range; less than the €360,000 per year salary Javier Clemente commanded during his 2006-2007 tenure when the team failed to qualify for Euro 2008. Furthermore, Antić's appointment came amid turmoil within the FSS as previous seven-month head coach Miroslav Đukić was being released following the disastrous 2008 Olympic appearance and Đukić's public feuding with the FSS president Karadžić.

==== 2010 World Cup qualifying ====
Hired barely two weeks before the start of the 2010 World Cup qualifying, Antić's bench debut took place on 6 September 2008 in a home qualifier against the Faroe Islands in front of fewer than 10,000 spectators. Antić introduced some fresh talent from the domestic league such as midfielders Nenad Milijaš and Zoran Tošić as well as defender Ivan Obradović in addition to bringing back skillful CSKA Moscow attacking midfielder Miloš Krasić who had been ignored by Đukić. With an unconvincing 2–0 win, the focus shifted to the away match at group-favourites France in Saint Denis four days later. Though returning to fielding tried and tested players, Antić still caused a surprise by starting nineteen-year-old Miralem Sulejmani on the left wing as well as leaving out tall target forward Nikola Žigić in favour of starting with only one striker, Marko Pantelić, in 4–5–1 formation. While Serbia lost 2–1 to somewhat wounded France that had just days earlier shockingly lost to Austria, the Serbian press still took some positives from the match at the Stade de France such as a brave attacking approach with a lot of running from the wings.

In October 2008, Serbia faced in-form Lithuania that was coming off defeating Romania and Austria without allowing a goal. Contrary to expectations, Antić's team made easy work of the Lithuanians in front of 20,000 home fans by scoring twice early, and adding one more towards the end for a 3–0 final score. Four days later, the team was away in Vienna to face Austria and again it put in an assured performance, scoring three goals within a ten-minute span during first half as shellshocked Austrians never managed to recover.

At the qualifying winter break, Serbia was sitting atop the group tied on points with Lithuania, but ahead on goal difference. Simultaneously, on the player personnel front, Antić was involved in a battle to secure the national team loyalty of two young, up-and-coming players who grew up outside of the country: twenty-year-old defender Neven Subotić and eighteen-year-old striker Bojan Krkić. Subotić ended up choosing Serbia over the United States and Bosnia and Herzegovina in December 2008 while Bojan chose to represent Spain despite Antić's numerous approaches.

As the qualifying restarted, in late March 2009, Antić's Serbia faced Romania in chilly conditions on a hard surface away at Constanța. In its toughest test of the entire campaign, Serbia came through again with a 2–3 win. Antić's resolve to continue playing attacking football (with two strikers Žigić and Pantelić upfront as well as two offensively minded wingers Krasić and Milan Jovanović just behind them) paid off again as Serbia all but eliminated Romania from the running for top two spots.

In his first qualifying campaign managing Serbia, Antić led the team to first place in their group thus qualifying directly for the 2010 FIFA World Cup.

In the wake of the successful qualification, amid Serbian press reports of icy relations between Antić and FSS president Karadžić, press reports appeared that Antić and the FSS had agreed a new contract. Over the coming weeks, Antić's new base salary became subject of rife press speculation putting the new annual sum anywhere from €528,000 to €1.2 million. Since the contract was not formally signed and announced by mid-December 2009, despite assurances to the contrary by Antić's agent Miško Ražnatović, the reports of Antić–Karadžić feud reignited, including irritated Antić flippantly claiming he did not know anything about a new contract. Eventually, on 18 December 2009, Antić's new contract was announced, extending his term to 2012.

During the early part of 2010, in addition to his regular assistants, Antić added experienced globetrotting Serbian coach Bora Milutinović in an adviser role. Milutinović in turn brought along his long-time assistant, Chilean Julio César Moreno. Antić mostly relied on them for opponent scouting.

In the run-up to the World Cup, out of the players Antić used in qualifying and subsequent friendlies, only the ageing defender Ivica Dragutinović and midfielder Boško Janković were ruled out through injury. Antić announced his 24-man squad in mid-May 2010 with no major surprises and an understanding that one player would be cut on 1 June.

==== Training camp and friendlies ====
The World Cup training camp began with a gathering in Kovilovo on 24 May 2010 with all but one player showing up: captain Dejan Stanković was allowed to join the team in Austria directly due to playing the Champions League final for Inter two days prior. After one light training session on the day of the gathering, the team left for Leogang the next morning. Nikola Žigić was not on the plane to Austria due to being permitted to fly out to England on 26 May 2010 to sign with Birmingham City. The absence of two starters were not the only issues at the beginning of the camp for Antić, as Luković missed the first training session in Austria due to high fever and Krasić had to train separately due to muscle pain ("primicač"). During the training in Austria, Branislav Ivanović was allowed to leave the squad for a short period in order to serve as best man at a wedding back in Serbia.

Despite missing two regulars—Ivanović and captain Stanković—for the first preparation friendly in Klagenfurt against minnows New Zealand, the 0–1 loss was still shocking as lethargic Serbia playing in a 4–4–2 formation created very little offensively, with Antić giving each one of the 18 available outfield players a runout. The next friendly—against Poland in Kufstein in torrential rain on a flooded pitch—also resulted in a surprising 0–0 scoreline, with Serbia missing a host of scoring chances (especially striker Pantelić). The final friendly before the World Cup, the so-called 'dress rehearsal', took place at home in Belgrade against Cameroon, and despite a 4–3 win, it came in nervous fashion as the Africans took the lead twice following lax Serbian defending. Throughout the three friendlies, Antić often rotated the squad giving everyone playing time.

==== 2010 World Cup ====
For the opening group match against Ghana, Antić came out with a 4–4–2 formation that he had often been using in qualifying. In the lacklustre first half, neither team created much—with midfield motor Krasić, as well as Jovanović, completely taken out of the match by the Ghanaian pressure tactics of double-teaming the Serbian wingers in order to cut off the supply from the flanks. Since Milijaš and Stanković also achieved little through the middle, Serbia was quickly reduced to launching long balls from the back thus bypassing its own midfield that was completely disrupted by quick and physical Ghanaians playing in the 3–6–1 formation set up by their Serbian head coach Milovan Rajevac. Hoping to inject some energy in the second half, Antić took out invisible Milijaš and brought on Zdravko Kuzmanović. While some openings were finally created (Žigić latching onto Pantelić's cross and mishitting the ball away from goal in 59th minute), the match was still mostly a sedated and disjointed affair. Swapping forward for forward, Antić took off misfiring Žigić and inserted Danko Lazović. As the match seemed headed for a drab goalless draw, central defender Luković pulled down a Ghana player in the 74th minute and got sent off for a second bookable offence. As a result of going down to ten men, Antić was forced to patch a hole in central defense by bringing on Subotić instead of largely ineffective Jovanović. Surprisingly, Serbia started playing much better, creating two excellent scoring opportunities in quick succession. However, in the 85th minute, following a harmless-looking Ghana cross, Kuzmanović handled in his own penalty area thus gifting Ghanaians the penalty and a 1–0 lead. Forced to chase the result for the remaining 5+ minutes, ten-man Serbia pushed forward in numbers in a desperate attempt of coming up with an equalizer thus leaving itself vulnerable to counterattack from quick Ghanaians and was extremely lucky not to go 0–2 down as Ghana hit the post in a one-on-one situation with goalkeeper Stojković.

Getting no points from the opening match meant that Serbia faced a must-win situation against its next opponent, powerhouse Germany that had destroyed Australia in their first match. Antić decided to switch the tactical formation to 4-3-3, which, when needed, adapted to more defensive 4-5-1 with young Subotić replacing suspended Luković in central defense, the three-man midfield had Ninković, Kuzmanović, and Stanković while upfront tall target-man Žigić got joined by wingers Krasić and Jovanović. After cautious opening, German forward Miroslav Klose got a second yellow card on 37 minutes. Only a minute later, Krasić stormed down the right flank, overrunning Holger Badstuber in the process and looping a high ball into the middle where tall Žigić headed it down for Jovanović who blasted it past Manuel Neuer from close range. Despite being down a man, Germany managed to create some chances in the remaining minutes of the first half with Sami Khedira hitting the crossbar. The first fifteen minutes of the second half featured a complete onslaught by undermanned Germany. With chances coming one after another, confused and disorganized Serbia was completely pushed back despite having an extra player on the pitch. The German offensive culminated in the 60th minute when Vidić needlessly handled the ball in the Serbian penalty area leading to the penalty shot being awarded to Germany. However, Lukas Podolski's low shot was parried by Stojković while Subotić then provided a key clearance to deny Mesut Özil a chance to get a shot away off the rebound. The penalty save provided an injection of confidence for Antić's team as it finally began to play in the second half. Even then, 10-man Germany still had the initiative but Serbia created a few good chances as well such as Žigić's header bouncing off the crossbar. Serbia eventually won the match 1–0, brought back hopes of progressing from the group.

In the final group game against Australia, Serbia only needed a single point to reach the knockout stages and named an unchanged line up from the 1–0 win over Germany. They were defeated by Australia 2–1 in an entertaining match where Serbia's dominance in the first half and in periods of the second half would have made it look like a Serbia victory. Their failure to convert many chances again proved costly with Australia scoring 2 goals in the second half through Tim Cahill and Brett Holman. A late Marko Pantelić goal served only as a consolation. They finished last in the group, missing out by a point.

==== Euro 2012 qualifiers and sacking ====
After the failed world up campaign, Serbia lost to Greece 1–0 at home in a friendly putting pressure on Radomir Antić. He started the campaign strongly with a 3–0 away win over the Faroe Islands. A frustrating 1–1 draw with Slovenia at home resulted in the sacking of Radomir Antić. He left the post with disappointment and sued the Serbian FA not long after.

=== Shandong Luneng Taishan ===
On 25 December 2012, it was announced that Antić signed a two-year contract with Chinese Super League side Shandong Luneng Taishan. with Aleksandar Rogic as his assistant. Although leading Shandong Luneng (which had finished in 12th position in the 2012 season) to second place in the league, he was released by Shandong on 21 December 2013.

=== Hebei Zhongji ===
On 27 January 2015, he signed a three-year contract with China League One side Hebei Zhongji. He was sacked on 18 August after not leading the club into the promotion zone.

== Personal life ==
Antić was married to Vera, with whom he had two children: a daughter Ana (married to basketball player Nikola Lončar) and a son Dušan (who is married to Mirjana). Antić had four grandchildren: two grandsons (Marko and Radomir) and two granddaughters (Ivan and Petra).

Antić lived in Madrid and Marbella in Spain.

=== Defamation suit ===
During the 1995–96 double title season in Spain, Antić had a notable public spat with the Spanish political columnist Hermann Tertsch of El País daily. In an interview with journalist Carmen Rigalt, published on 10 September 1995 in El Mundo, Antić took issue with the views expressed by Tertsch. Seeing Tertsch's views and coverage of the Yugoslav Wars as anti-Serbian, Antić referred to the columnist as a "Nazi". Tertsch in turn sued Antić for slander and received a court ruling in his favour in the amount of ESP2 million. Following appeals, the case even went before the Spanish Supreme Court that confirmed in mid-November 2003 the original ruling in Tertsch's favour, thus ordering Antić to pay the euro equivalent of the originally awarded amount, approximately €12,000.

== Death and legacy ==
He died on 6 April 2020 in Madrid, aged 71, with COVID-19 after having struggled for several years with pancreatitis.

On 12 August 2021, the name of the Sloboda Užice stadium was officially changed to the Radomir Antić Stadium.

== Managerial statistics ==
Managerial record by team and tenure
Team	From	To	Record				
Team	From	To	P	W	D	L	Win %
Zaragoza	1 July 1988	30 June 1990	86	35	24	27	40.70
Real Madrid	21 March 1991	27 January 1992	39	27	6	6	69.23
Real Oviedo	5 February 1993	30 June 1995	112	41	31	40	36.61
Atlético Madrid	1 July 1995	30 June 1998	157	81	41	35	51.59
Atlético Madrid	24 March 1999	30 June 1999	14	4	5	5	28.57
Atlético Madrid	4 March 2000	15 May 2000	15	2	5	8	13.33
Real Oviedo	1 July 2000	30 June 2001	39	11	8	20	28.21
Barcelona	7 February 2003	30 June 2003	24	12	8	4	50.00
Celta Vigo	29 January 2004	29 March 2004	10	1	1	8	10.00
Serbia	20 August 2008	15 September 2010	28	17	3	8	60.71
Shandong Luneng	24 December 2012	21 December 2013	32	19	5	8	59.38
Hebei Zhongji	27 January 2015	18 August 2015	23	11	5	7	47.83
Total			579	261	142	176	45.08

== Honours ==
=== Player ===
Partizan

- Yugoslav First League: 1975–76

Fenerbahçe

- 1. Lig: 1977–78

Luton Town

- Second Division: 1981–82

=== Manager ===
Atlético Madrid

- La Liga: 1995–96
- Copa del Rey: 1995–96

=== Individual ===
- Don Balón Award: Best Coach 1995–96
- Serbian Coach of the Year: 2009
