= 1996 Copa del Rey final =

Copa del Rey 1996 final
- Event: 1995–96 Copa del Rey
Barcelona	Atlético Madrid
0	1
- Date: 10 April 1996
- Venue: La Romareda Stadium, Zaragoza
- Referee: Manuel Díaz Vega
- Attendance: 37,000

The 1996 Copa del Rey final was the 94th final of the Spanish cup competition, the Copa del Rey. The final was played at La Romareda Stadium in Zaragoza on 10 April 1996. The match was won by Atlético Madrid, who beat Barcelona 1–0, meaning Atlético completed the domestic double.

== Details ==
10 April 1996
20:30 CET

Barcelona	0–1 (a.e.t.)	Atlético Madrid
	Report (in Spanish)	Pantić 102'

La Romareda, Zaragoza
Attendance: 32,500
Referee: Manuel Díaz Vega

Barcelona	Atlético Madrid

GK	1	(Spain) Carles Busquets
RB	26	(Spain) Albert Celades		(substituted off) 17'
CB	20	(Spain) Miguel Ángel Nadal	(yellow card) 66'
CB	5	(Romania) Gheorghe Popescu
LB	12	(Spain) Sergi	(yellow card) 27' (red card) 117'
DM	4	(Spain) Pep Guardiola
DM	8	(Spain) Guillermo Amor
RM	11	(Romania) Gheorghe Hagi	(yellow card) 36'
AM	6	(Spain) José Mari Bakero (c)	(yellow card) 18'	(substituted off) 61'
LM	7	(Portugal) Luís Figo		(substituted off) 75'
FW	14	(Netherlands) Jordi Cruyff
Substitutes:
GK	13	(Spain) Jesús Angoy
DF	2	(Spain) Albert Ferrer		(substituted in) 17'
DF	3	(Spain) Abelardo
MF	21	(Croatia) Robert Prosinečki		(substituted in) 75'
MF	24	(Spain) Roger	(yellow card) 104'	(substituted in) 61'
Manager:
(Netherlands) Johan Cruyff

GK	1	(Spain) José Molina	(yellow card) 118'
RB	20	(Spain) Delfí Geli
CB	6	(Spain) Santi	(yellow card) 25'
CB	4	(Spain) Roberto Solozábal	(yellow card) 112' (red card) 116'
LB	3	(Spain) Toni (c)	(yellow card) 35'
RM	10	(Federal Republic of Yugoslavia) Milinko Pantić	(yellow card) 41'
CM	14	(Argentina) Diego Simeone
CM	8	(Spain) Juan Vizcaíno		(substituted off) 82'
LM	21	(Spain) José Luis Caminero
RF	19	(Spain) Kiko		(substituted off) 84'
LF	9	(Bulgaria) Luboslav Penev		(substituted off) 61'
Substitutes:
GK	13	(Spain) Ricardo
DF	2	(Spain) Tomás
DF	5	(Spain) Juanma López		(substituted in) 61'
MF	18	(Spain) Roberto		(substituted in) 84'
FW	7	(Argentina) Leonardo Biagini		(substituted in) 82'
Manager:
(Federal Republic of Yugoslavia) Radomir Antić

MATCH RULES

- 90 minutes.
- 30 minutes of extra-time if necessary.
- Penalty shoot-out if scores still level.
- Five named substitutes.
- Maximum of three substitutions.
