= Pirri (disambiguation) =

Pirri is a Spanish former footballer (born 1945)

Pirri may also refer to:

- Pirri (footballer, born 1970), a Spanish former footballer
- Pirri (surname), Italian surname
- Pirri (Cagliari), district of Cagliari, Italy
