= José de la Sagra =

Spanish footballer

Personal information
- Full name: José Antonio de la Sagra Fermín
- Date of birth: 1 April 1976 (age 50)
- Place of birth: Toledo, Spain
- Height: 1.77 m (5 ft 10 in)
- Position: Midfielder

Team information
- Current team: Lleida Esportiu (assistant)

Youth career
- 1988–1990: Chopera
- 1990–1994: Atlético de Madrid

Senior career*
| Years | Team | Apps | (Gls) |
| 1993–1996 | Atlético Madrid B | 50 | (6) |
| 1994–1996 | Atlético Madrid | 3 | (0) |
| 1996–1997 | Barcelona B | 14 | (0) |
| 1997–1998 | Boavista | 1 | (0) |
| 1998 | → Beira-Mar (loan) | 10 | (0) |
| 1998–1999 | Atlante | | |
| 1998 | → Irapuato (loan) | | |
| 1999 | Cacereño | 18 | (0) |
| 1999–2001 | Nice | 15 | (0) |
| 2001–2002 | Dénia | | |
| 2002–2003 | Yeclano | | |
| 2003 | Eldense | | |
| 2003–2004 | Villarrobledo | | |
| 2004–2005 | Santa Pola | | |
| 2005–2006 | Altea | | |
| 2006–2007 | Polop | | |
| 2007–2008 | Alone de Guardamar | | |
| 2008–2009 | Benidorm B | | |
| 2009–2010 | Calpe | | |
| 2010–2013 | Mutxamel | | |

International career
| 1994 | Spain U18 | 6 | (0) |
| 1995 | Spain U19 | 2 | (1) |

Managerial career
- 2013–2014: Eldense
- 2014: Jove Español
- 2016–2017: Rayo Ibense
- 2017–2020: Roda
- 2019: → Akonangui (loan)
- 2020–2021: Hércules U19
- 2021: Hércules B
- 2021–2022: Hércules (assistant)
- 2022–: Lleida Esportiu (assistant)
- * Club domestic league appearances and goals

José Antonio de la Sagra Fermín (born 1 April 1976), sometimes known simply as Pepe de la Sagra or Dela, is a Spanish football manager and former player who played as a midfielder. He is the current second manager of Lleida Esportiu.

== Playing career ==
As a player, he is a product of the Atlético Madrid school. His good performances at Atlético B, prompted him to be an under-19 international with Spain and form part of the Atlético squad for the "doblete" in the 1995–96 season in which he won La Liga and Copa del Rey. De la Sagra was the number 16 of that great team trained by Radomir Antić with players like Simeone, Kiko, Molina, Penev, Pantić or Caminero.

He continued his progress as a professional at Barcelona B, and from there he made the leap to leagues in Portugal, Mexico and France. Upon his return to Spain, he settled in the province of Alicante, where he played in the fourth and fifth levels in teams from this province.

== Coaching career ==
As a sporting director, he coordinated the different Mutxamel CF teams and subsequently trained at the fourth level, standing out at CD Roda, the Villarreal CF factory. In June, July and August 2019 he signed as head coach of Akonangui FC of Equatorial Guinea to play the qualifying round of the CAF Confederation Cup, where he was eliminated by Ashanti Gold of Ghana. The CD Roda allowed him to spend three months directing Equatorial Guinea team.

In the 2020–21 season he signs for Hércules U19, and his good work makes him finish the season at Hércules B on the fourth level where he manages to escape relegation. With the arrival of Sergio Mora to the bench of the Hércules CF first team, De la Sagra becomes the second manager in the 2021–22 season on Segunda RFEF and director of the football farm of the Alicante-based club.

De la Sagra signed in the 2022–23 season as assistant coach to Pere Martí at Lleida Esportiu.
