= Joan Barbarà =

Spanish footballer and coach

Personal information
- Full name: Joan Barbarà Mata
- Date of birth: 23 July 1966 (age 60)
- Place of birth: L'Hospitalet, Spain
- Height: 1.72 m (5 ft 8 in)
- Position: Forward

Senior career*
Years	Team	Apps	(Gls)
1983–1986	Sants		
1986–1993	Sabadell	209	(43)
1993–2001	Salamanca	224	(54)
2001–2002	Lleida	32	(4)
2002–2003	Hospitalet	38	(6)
Total		503+	(107+)

Managerial career
- 2008–2014: Barcelona B (assistant)
- 2014–2017: Barcelona (auxiliary)
- * Club domestic league appearances and goals

Joan Barbarà Mata (born 23 July 1966) is a Spanish former professional footballer who played as a forward.

He appeared in 295 Segunda División matches over nine seasons, totalling 66 goals for Sabadell and Salamanca. He represented both clubs in La Liga in a 20-year senior career.

== Playing career ==
Born in L'Hospitalet de Llobregat, Barcelona, Catalonia, Barbarà made his senior debut with local amateurs UE Sants. In the 1986 off-season he moved to La Liga with CE Sabadell FC, playing his first game in the competition on 17 December 1986 in a 1–1 home draw against Real Betis where he came on as a 72nd-minute substitute. He scored his first goal the following 17 May, helping the hosts to defeat Cádiz CF 2–0.

In June 1993, after being relegated from Segunda División, Barbarà signed with UD Salamanca. He scored 13 goals in his second season, helping the Castile and León club promote to the top tier after a 12-year absence. He netted a further 12 in the following campaign, but could not prevent his team's relegation; during his stint with the Charros, he was also captain.

In the summer of 2001, aged 35, Barbarà left Salamanca and joined UE Lleida in the Segunda División B. A year later, he moved to CE L'Hospitalet in the same league, and retired at the end of 2002–03.

== Coaching career ==
After retiring, Barbarà started working in FC Barcelona's youth squads. He subsequently served as Barcelona B's scout during Pep Guardiola's spell, and in 2008 was named the reserves' assistant manager.

Barbarà acted as both Luis Enrique and Eusebio Sacristán's assistant and, after the appointment of the former to the main squad in 2014, he was hired as auxiliary coach.
