= Juan Carlos (footballer, born 1973) =

Spanish footballer

Personal information
- Full name: Juan Carlos Gómez Díaz
- Date of birth: 6 April 1973 (age 53)
- Place of birth: Córdoba, Spain
- Height: 1.76 m (5 ft 9 in)
- Position: Forward

Youth career
- Córdoba

Senior career*
Years	Team	Apps	(Gls)
1991–1992	Córdoba B		
1992–1993	Córdoba	31	(7)
1993–1996	Atlético Madrid B	39	(21)
1994–1995	→ Marbella (loan)	30	(11)
1996–1997	Atlético Madrid	33	(5)
1997–1998	Valladolid	9	(2)
1998–2000	Sevilla	67	(25)
2000–2003	Atlético Madrid	12	(1)
2002–2003	→ Getafe (loan)	23	(4)
2003–2004	Elche	7	(1)
2006–2007	Lucena	3	(0)
Total		254	(77)

Managerial career
- 2002–2013: Ciudad Jardín
- 2015: Mairena
- 2015–2018: Écija
- 2019–2020: Xerez
- 2020–2021: Vélez
- 2021: Don Benito
- 2022–2023: Xerez
- * Club domestic league appearances and goals

Juan Carlos Gómez Díaz (born 6 April 1973), known as Juan Carlos, is a Spanish retired footballer who played as a forward. He was most recently the manager of Xerez CD.

== Playing career ==
Born in Córdoba, Andalusia, Carlos made his senior debut with Córdoba CF's reserves in 1991. In 1993, after playing for the first team in Segunda División B, he moved to another reserve team in the same division, Atlético Madrid B.

After scoring a career-best twenty-one goals during the season, Carlos was loaned for one year in July 1994 to Segunda División side CA Marbella. He made his debut in the category on 4 September of that year by starting in a 1–3 away loss against Hércules CF. He scored his first goal fourteen days later in a 4–1 away routing of CD Badajoz.

After scoring eleven goals for Marbella, Carlos returned to Atleti in July 1995, and was subsequently assigned to the first team in La Liga the following January. He made his top-tier debut on 6 January 1996, starting and scoring his team's first in a 3–1 home win against CD Tenerife.

Mainly a backup to Lyuboslav Penev and Kiko during his spell, Carlos was featured sparingly before moving to fellow league team Real Valladolid in 1997. In the following year, after struggling with injuries, he joined Sevilla FC in the second level.

Carlos was an ever-present figure for the club during his two-season stint, achieving top tier promotion as champions but suffering immediate relegation. He spent the remainder of his career in the second level but impaired from his injuries; he represented Atlético Madrid, Getafe CF and Elche CF. He had trials with third-level side CD Villanueva, but nothing came of them.

Carlos retired in 2007, aged 34, after playing for Lucena CF in Tercera División.

== Managerial career ==
Carlos began his managerial career in 2012 with the regional leagues of CD Ciudad Jardín. In February 2015, after more than a year without a club, he took over CD Mairena in the fourth level.

On 17 July 2015, Carlos was appointed manager of Écija Balompié, also in the fourth division.

In July 2019, he became the new manager of Xerez CD in the Tercera División.

After stints at Vélez CF and CD Don Benito, he returned to Xerez CD in October 2022. On 26 February 2023, he was relieved of his duties.

== Honors ==
=== Player ===
Atlético Madrid

- La Liga: 1995–96
- Copa del Rey: 1995–96
- Segunda División: 2001–02
