= Santi Denia =

Spanish footballer and manager

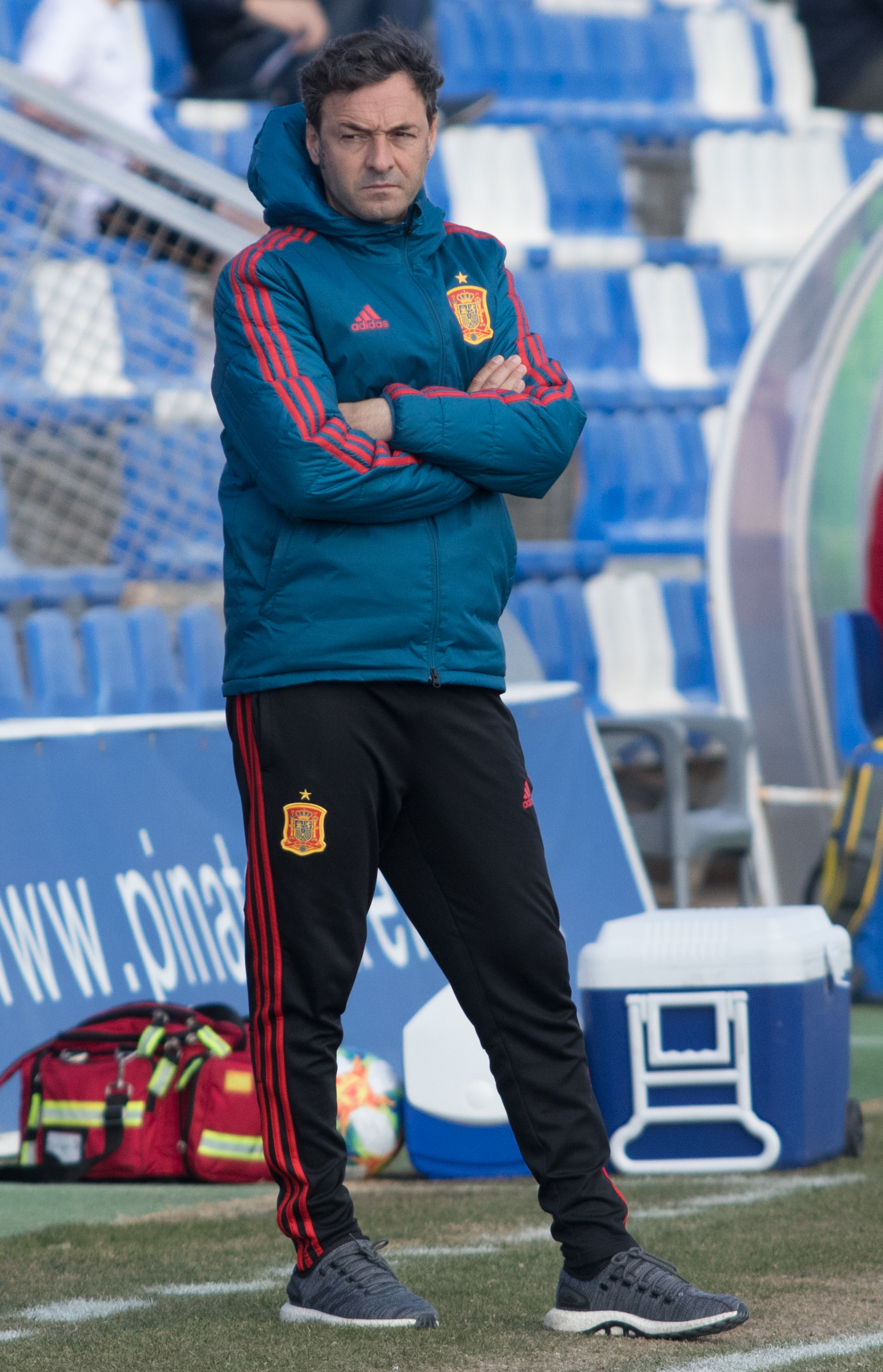
- Santi as Spain U19 manager

Personal information
- Full name: Santiago Denia Sánchez
- Date of birth: 9 March 1974 (age 52)
- Place of birth: Albacete, Spain
- Height: 1.81 m (5 ft 11 in)
- Position: Centre-back

Team information
- Current team: Czech Republic (manager)

Youth career
- Albacete

Senior career*
Years	Team	Apps	(Gls)
1992–1995	Albacete	98	(2)
1995–2005	Atlético Madrid	225	(7)
2005	→ Albacete (loan)	12	(0)
2005–2007	Albacete	26	(1)
Total		361	(10)

International career
1991	Spain U18	1	(0)
1992–1996	Spain U21	27	(0)
1996	Spain U23	3	(1)
1997–1998	Spain	2	(0)

Managerial career
- 2009: Atlético Madrid (assistant)
- 2009: Atlético Madrid (caretaker)
- 2010–2018: Spain U17
- 2018–2022: Spain U19
- 2022–2025: Spain U21
- 2024: Spain U23
- 2025: Al Shahaniya
- 2026–: Czech Republic
Medal record
Men's football
Representing Spain (as manager)
Olympic Games
Gold medal – first place	2024 Paris	Team
FIFA U-17 World Cup
Runner-up	2017 India	Team
UEFA European Under-21 Championship
Runner-up	2023 Georgia–Romania	Team
UEFA European Under-19 Championship
Winner	2019 Armenia	Team
UEFA European Under-17 Championship
Winner	2017 Croatia	Team
Runner-up	2016 Azerbaijan	Team
- * Club domestic league appearances and goals

Santiago Denia Sánchez (born 9 March 1974), commonly known as Santi as a player, is a Spanish former professional footballer who played as a central defender. He is currently manager of the Czech Republic national team.

He appeared in 297 La Liga matches over 11 seasons (eight goals scored), with Albacete and Atlético Madrid. He won the 1996 league championship with the latter club.

Denia started working as a head coach in 2010, being in charge of several Spain youth teams and winning the gold medal at the 2024 Summer Olympics.

== Club career ==
Born in Albacete, Castilla–La Mancha, Santi began playing professionally with his hometown side. He made his La Liga debut at age 18, and immediately became an undisputed starter as they constantly managed to retain their top-flight status.

Santi signed for Atlético Madrid in the summer of 1995, being crowned league and Copa del Rey champion in his first season as part of a defensive line which also included youth graduates Juan Manuel López and Roberto Solozábal. He appeared in 37 league matches during the campaign.

Following Atlético's 2000 relegation (he collected a career-worst 17 yellow cards), Santi gradually lost his importance in the team's plans. In 2004–05, after the signing of Pablo Ibáñez – who also came from Albacete – he featured in no games at all in the first half of the season, and was subsequently allowed to leave on loan in January 2005 to his first club. The move was made permanent in June and he retired after two more years, with Albacete now in the Segunda División.

Santi eventually returned to Atlético Madrid in early February 2009, as assistant to newly-appointed Abel Resino who had replaced Javier Aguirre. He was a caretaker manager for the fixture against Mallorca on 24 October, before the appointment of Quique Sánchez Flores.

== International career ==
Santi was capped twice for Spain, his debut coming on 11 October 1997 in a 1998 FIFA World Cup qualifier against Faroe Islands (3–1 in Gijón, playing the entire match). He still featured in a friendly win over Sweden in March 1998, but did not make the cut for the finals in France.

Previously, Santi appeared for the nation at the 1996 Summer Olympics.

== Coaching career ==
After retiring, Denia acted as head coach to Spain under-17s and under-19s. He led the second age group to the UEFA European Championship in 2019.

In December 2022, after Luis de la Fuente was promoted to the full side following Luis Enrique's resignation, Denia was named the former's replacement at the helm of the under-21s. He won the gold medal at the 2024 Summer Olympics in France, thanks to a Sergio Camello late goal in extra time to beat the hosts.

Denia returned to club duties in summer 2025, being appointed at Qatar Stars League's Al Shahaniya. He was dismissed in November following a poor run of results.

On 31 July 2026, Denia became head coach of Czech Republic, signing a two-year contract and in the process being the first foreigner in history to take charge of the national team; he succeeded Miroslav Koubek, who stepped down following their group-stage exit at the 2026 FIFA World Cup.

== Career statistics ==
Appearances and goals by club, season and competition
Club	Season	League			Copa del Rey		Europe		Other		Total	
Club	Season	Division	Apps	Goals	Apps	Goals	Apps	Goals	Apps	Goals	Apps	Goals
Albacete	1992–93	La Liga	31	0	7	0	—		—		38	0
Albacete	1993–94	La Liga	34	0	0	0	—		—		34	0
Albacete	1994–95	La Liga	33	2	8	0	—		—		41	2
Albacete	Total		98	2	15	0	—		—		113	2
Atlético Madrid	1995–96	La Liga	37	0	11	0	—		—		48	0
Atlético Madrid	1996–97	La Liga	37	2	3	0	7 (Note: Appearances in UEFA Champions League)	0	—		47	2
Atlético Madrid	1997–98	La Liga	33	3	2	0	8 (Note: Appearances in UEFA Cup)	1	—		43	4
Atlético Madrid	1998–99	La Liga	30	0	6	0	8	1	—		44	1
Atlético Madrid	1999–2000	La Liga	28	0	7	0	5	0	—		40	0
Atlético Madrid	2000–01	Segunda División	23	0	4	0	—		—		27	0
Atlético Madrid	2001–02	Segunda División	15	1	0	0	—		—		15	1
Atlético Madrid	2002–03	La Liga	8	1	3	0	—		—		11	1
Atlético Madrid	2003–04	La Liga	14	0	4	0	—		—		18	0
Atlético Madrid	2004–05	La Liga	0	0	2	0	—		1 (Note: Appearance in UEFA Intertoto Cup)	0	3	0
Atlético Madrid	Total		225	7	42	0	28	2	1	0	296	9
Albacete (loan)	2004–05	La Liga	12	0	0	0	—		—		12	0
Albacete	2005–06	Segunda División	21	0	1	0	—		—		22	0
Albacete	2006–07	Segunda División	5	1	—		—		—		5	1
Albacete	Total		38	1	—		—		—		39	1
Career total			361	10	58	0	28	3	1	0	448	13

== Managerial statistics ==
As of match played 15 November 2026

Managerial record by team and tenure
Team	From	To	Record							
Team	From	To	G	W	D	L	GF	GA	GD	Win %
Atlético Madrid (caretaker)	24 October 2009	25 October 2009	1	0	1	0	1	1	+0	0.00
Spain U17	1 July 2010	24 July 2018	90	49	24	17	163	79	+84	54.44
Spain U19	24 July 2018	11 December 2022	37	20	14	3	73	27	+46	54.05
Spain U21	12 December 2022	26 June 2025	30	17	8	5	57	29	+28	56.67
Spain U23	1 July 2024	9 August 2024	6	5	0	1	16	8	+8	83.33
Al-Shahania	1 July 2025	13 November 2025	13	3	2	8	9	18	−9	23.08
Czech Republic	31 July 2026	Present	6	0	0	6	3	14	−11	0.00
Total			183	94	49	40	322	176	+146	51.37

== Honours ==
=== Player ===
Atlético Madrid

- La Liga: 1995–96
- Copa del Rey: 1995–96
- Segunda División: 2001–02

Spain U21

- UEFA European Under-21 Championship runner-up: 1996

=== Manager ===
Spain U17

- UEFA European Under-17 Championship: 2017; runner-up: 2016
- FIFA U-17 World Cup runner-up: 2017

Spain U19

- UEFA European Under-19 Championship: 2019

Spain U21

- UEFA European Under-21 Championship runner-up: 2023

Spain U23

- Summer Olympics gold medal: 2024
