= Pirri (surname) =

Pirri is a surname. Notable people with the name include:

- Brandon Pirri (born 1991), Canadian ice hockey player
- David Pirri (born 1974), Spanish football player and manager
- Jim Pirri, American actor, voice actor and fight choreographer
- Massimo Pirri (1945–2001), Italian film director and screenwriter
