= Manel Ruano =

Spanish footballer

Personal information
- Full name: Francisco Manel Ruano Bausán
- Date of birth: 16 July 1974 (age 52)
- Place of birth: Barcelona, Spain
- Height: 1.79 m (5 ft 10 1/2 in)
- Position: Winger

Team information
- Current team: Atlético Madrid C (manager)

Youth career
- 1991–1992: Gramenet
- 1992–1993: Damm

Senior career*
Years	Team	Apps	(Gls)
1993–1994	Gramenet	31	(8)
1994–1995	Atlético Madrid B	18	(8)
1995	Atlético Madrid	9	(0)
1995–1996	Valladolid	1	(0)
1996	→ Rayo Vallecano (loan)	9	(1)
1996–1997	Levante	34	(8)
1997–1998	Mérida	31	(2)
1998–2003	Málaga	63	(6)
2003	Córdoba	15	(0)
2004–2005	Castelldefels	17	(0)
2005–2006	Balaguer		
Total		228	(33)

Managerial career
- 2011–2015: Málaga (youth)
- 2015–2018: Málaga B
- 2019–2021: Betis B
- 2023: Estepona
- 2023: Mérida
- 2024: OH Leuven (assistant)
- 2024–2025: Guadalajara (assistant)
- 2025–: Atlético Madrid C
- * Club domestic league appearances and goals

Francisco Manel Ruano Bausán (born 16 July 1974) is a retired Spanish footballer who played as a right winger, and currently manager of Atlético Madrid C.

== Playing career ==
Born in Barcelona, Catalonia, Ruano started playing football with UDA Gramenet in 1993, in Segunda División B. The following year, he joined Atlético Madrid; initially assigned to the reserves also in the third division, he made his first-team debut on 4 January 1995 by starting in a 0–0 away draw against CD Mensajero in the Copa del Rey.

Ruano first appeared in La Liga on 15 January 1995, coming on as a second-half substitute in a 1–1 home draw against SD Compostela. In June, after 12 competitive matches, he moved to Real Valladolid.

After only three competitive appearances, Ruano was loaned to fellow top-level club Rayo Vallecano in January 1996. He scored his first professional goal on 14 April of that year, the first in a 2–4 loss at RCD Espanyol.

Ruano signed for Segunda División side Levante UD in July 1996, being an undisputed starter during his first and only season. The following year, he returned to the top flight after joining Mérida UD.

In the summer of 1998, Ruano moved to Málaga CF of the second tier. He helped the club in their promotion by appearing regularly, but received little playing time in the following years mainly due to injuries.

On 10 December 2002, Ruano was loaned to Córdoba CF until the following June. He cut ties with his parent club in August 2003, and subsequently represented amateurs UE Castelldefels and CF Balaguer, retiring with the latter in 2006 at the age of 31.

== Coaching career ==
Ruano returned to Málaga on 8 June 2011, being appointed manager of the youth setup. On 20 June 2015 he was named coach of Atlético Malagueño, replacing Salva Ballesta.

In June 2019, Ruano became coach of Betis Deportivo Balompié also in Tercera División.

== Managerial statistics ==
As of 31 October 2026

Managerial record by team and tenure
Team	Nat	From	To	Record								Ref
Team	Nat	From	To	G	W	D	L	GF	GA	GD	Win %	Ref
Málaga B	(Spain)	20 June 2015	22 January 2018	111	77	20	14	277	99	+178	69.37	
Betis B	(Spain)	7 June 2019	30 November 2021	69	32	16	21	117	73	+44	46.38	
Estepona	(Spain)	22 February 2023	23 May 2023	12	4	4	4	13	11	+2	33.33	
Mérida	(Spain)	30 October 2023	12 December 2023	6	1	1	4	3	7	−4	16.67	
Atlético Madrid C	(Spain)	16 July 2025	Present	43	23	12	8	95	55	+40	53.49	
Total				241	137	53	51	505	245	+260	56.85	—
