= Pirri (footballer, born 1970) =

Spanish association football player

Personal information
- Full name: Francisco Javier Mori Cuesta
- Date of birth: 10 November 1970 (age 55)
- Place of birth: Cangas de Onís, Spain
- Height: 1.80 m (5 ft 11 in)
- Position: Midfielder

Senior career*
Years	Team	Apps	(Gls)
1990–1991	Ribadesella	?	(?)
1991–1992	Real Oviedo Vetusta	?	(?)
1992–1993	Real Oviedo	30	(1)
1993–1996	Atlético Madrid	74	(10)
1996–1997	SD Compostela	12	(0)
1997–1999	Mérida	19	(1)
1998–1999	→ Barnsley (loan)	2	(0)
Total		137	(12)
- * Club domestic league appearances and goals

Francisco Javier Mori Cuesta (born 10 November 1970), known as Pirri, is a Spanish retired footballer who played as a midfielder.

He was successful during the 1990s, playing for six years in La Liga. Most notably, he played a part in Atlético Madrid's double winning season in 1995–96.

== Career ==
Pirri was born in Cangas de Onís in the autonomous community of Asturias, and began his career with nearby coastal club Ribadesella. His form for Ribadesella earned him a move to one of Asturias's largest clubs, Real Oviedo, in 1991. Playing initially in the reserve team, he was promoted to the senior squad in 1992, and played a significant part in that season's La Liga campaign. He made his La Liga debut on 5 September 1992 against Logroñés at the Estadio Las Gaunas, as Oviedo were beaten 1–0 by the hosts. He scored his first and only goal for Oviedo at the Estadio Carlos Tartiere on 19 December 1992, on the team's way to beating visitors Real Burgos 3–0. Ultimately he played 30 times to help Oviedo to 16th place.

His good form earned him a move to Spanish giants Atlético Madrid in the summer of 1993. He missed Atleti's first match of the season, making his debut on 10 September 1993 in a La Liga match against Valencia, away at the Mestalla Stadium. He scored on his debut as Los Rojiblancos managed to hold the hosts to a 2–2 draw. He made his European debut three days later as Atlético travelled to Scotland for the first leg of their UEFA Cup first round tie against Heart of Midlothian at Tynecastle Park. The visitors lost 2–1, but later overturned the deficit in the second leg to progress 4–2 on aggregate.

He finally made his home debut on 18 September as Atleti faced Celta Vigo at the Vicente Calderón Stadium. The hosts ran out 3–2 winners. In a match against Barcelona on 29 October Pirri was sent off for the first time in his career, although Los Rojiblancos did beat their illustrious rivals 4–3. He did not play in the first leg of the next UEFA Cup tie, but did travel to Greece to face OFI at the Theodoros Vardinogiannis Stadium, with Atleti leading 1–0 from the first leg. However, the Cretans scored twice to win the tie. He scored his first home goal for the club in the match against Racing Santander on 18 December, as they won 4–0. In terms of appearances, the 1993–94 season was his most successful at Atlético, as he made 39 appearances and scored 4 goals in all competitions to help the club to a slightly disappointing 12th overall.

The following season Pirri played 26 games, and took a good haul of 7 goals in all competitions. It was a disappointing season for Los Rojiblancos however, as they could only managed 14th in the league. However, the arrival of Radomir Antić as managed ahead of the 1995–96 season would revolutionise their fortunes. Pirri played 19 league games, and scored the only goal in a 1–1 draw at home to Real Betis on 13 April, as Atlético were crowned La Liga champions for the first time since 1976–77. He also contributed to their successful Copa del Rey campaign, including scoring the opening goal in the away leg of the third round tie against Mérida at the Estadio Romano. Atleti eventually won the scintillating tie 8–5 on aggregate. He played in the home leg of the semi-final against Valencia, but did not feature in the final, where Atleti beat Barcelona to win the trophy.

Despite this highly successful season, Pirri left Atlético in the summer transfer window to join La Liga rivals SD Compostela. He made his debut on 6 September 1996 as Compostela hosted his old club, Atlético, at the Estadio Vero Boquete de San Lázaro. He was able to help his new club pull of a shock 3–1 victory against the defending champions. He ultimately played 15 times without scoring as Compostela finished 11th, and departed at the end of the season to join Mérida.

His debut for newly-promoted Mérida came in their first La Liga game of the season, away at another of Pirri's former clubs, Real Oviedo. His new team lost 2–0. He made his home debut in the following match, which was against yet another of his former clubs, SD Compostela. In an exciting 3–3 draw, Pirri scored his first goal for Mérida. This would prove to be his only goal for the club, as his 20 appearances could not save them from being relegated in 19th place.

He remained with Mérida the following year, but made no appearances before joining English second-tier club Barnsley on loan in December 1998. He made his Barnsley debut on 9 April 1999 in a Football League First Division match at Oakwell. They were held to a 1–1 draw by visitors Tranmere Rovers. His only other appearance was on 15 April at home to Sunderland, who beat the Tykes 3–1 on their way to the title. Pirri did not return to Mérida when he left Oakwell in the summer, so his two matches with Barnsley were to be his last in professional football.

== Honours ==
=== Atlético Madrid ===
- La Liga: 1995–96
- Copa del Rey: 1995–96
