= Roberto Fresnedoso =

Spanish footballer

Roberto
Personal information
- Full name: Roberto Luis Fresnedoso Prieto
- Date of birth: 15 January 1973 (age 53)
- Place of birth: Toledo, Spain
- Height: 1.86 m (6 ft 1 in)
- Position: Midfielder

Team information
- Current team: Atlético Madrid (youth)

Youth career
- Girona

Senior career*
Years	Team	Apps	(Gls)
1990–1991	Girona	17	(3)
1991–1993	Hospitalet	60	(11)
1993–1995	Español	69	(8)
1995–2002	Atlético Madrid	139	(13)
1998	→ Espanyol (loan)	16	(1)
2002–2003	Salamanca	40	(10)
2003–2004	Murcia	8	(0)
2004	Rayo Vallecano	10	(1)
2004–2005	Cultural Leonesa	25	(7)
Total		384	(54)

International career
1994–1996	Spain U21	14	(4)
1996	Spain U23	3	(0)

Managerial career
- 2010–: Atlético Madrid (youth)
- 2013–2015: Atlético Madrid C
- 2015: Atlético Madrid B
Medal record
Men's football
Representing Spain
UEFA European Under-21 Championship
Runner-up	1996 Spain
- * Club domestic league appearances and goals

Roberto Luis Fresnedoso Prieto (born 15 January 1973), known simply as Roberto, is a Spanish former professional footballer who played as a midfielder.

== Club career ==
Born in Toledo, Castilla–La Mancha, Roberto moved to Catalonia in his teens. He started his football career in the area, first with Girona FC then moving to RCD Español, spending his first years with its farm team CE L'Hospitalet. He made his first appearance with the main squad in the 1992–93 season, in an eventual La Liga relegation.

After solid performances in the following years – this included 36 games with five goals in the 1994–95 campaign, as Espanyol qualified for the UEFA Cup straight out of Segunda División – Roberto signed with Atlético Madrid. Never an undisputed starter in seven years, he did manage 31 matches with three goals scored in his first, where the capital side won the double; he was also loaned in January 1998 to his former club Espanyol.

An all-around midfielder, Roberto retired in 2005 following spells with UD Salamanca, Real Murcia CF, Rayo Vallecano and Cultural y Deportiva Leonesa (the latter in the Segunda División B). In 2010 he returned to Atlético as a manager, being appointed at its youth sides.

== Honours ==
Espanyol

- Segunda División: 1993–94

Atlético Madrid

- La Liga: 1995–96
- Copa del Rey: 1995–96
- Segunda División: 2001–02

Spain U21

- UEFA European Under-21 Championship runner-up: 1996
