= Roberto Solozábal =

Spanish footballer

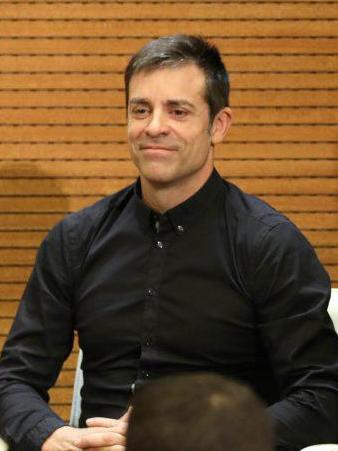
- Solozábal in 2017

Personal information
- Full name: Roberto Solozábal Villanueva
- Date of birth: 15 September 1969 (age 57)
- Place of birth: Madrid, Spain
- Height: 1.80 m (5 ft 11 in)
- Position: Centre-back

Youth career
- Atlético Madrid

Senior career*
Years	Team	Apps	(Gls)
1988–1989	Atlético Madrileño	28	(1)
1989–1997	Atlético Madrid	231	(3)
1997–2000	Betis	42	(0)
Total		301	(4)

International career
1987–1988	Spain U18	8	(0)
1988–1989	Spain U19	2	(0)
1989–1990	Spain U20	5	(0)
1989–1991	Spain U21	4	(0)
1991–1992	Spain U23	12	(1)
1991–1993	Spain	12	(0)
- * Club domestic league appearances and goals

Olympic medal record

Representing Spain

Men's Football
Gold medal – first place	1992 Barcelona	Team competition

Roberto Solozábal Villanueva (born 15 September 1969) is a Spanish former professional footballer who played as a central defender.

He appeared in 273 La Liga games over 11 seasons, representing in the competition Atlético Madrid and Betis.

== Club career ==
=== Atlético Madrid ===
A product of local Atlético Madrid's youth system, Madrid-born Solozábal represented the first team from 1989 to 1997, his debut being on 2 September in a 3–1 away win against Valencia CF (90 minutes played). Other than his first season – ten appearances – he never played less than 18 La Liga games during his eight-year spell.

During the 1995–96 campaign, Solózabal formed a solid centre-back partnership with another Colchonero youth graduate, Juan Manuel López, as the capital side achieved an historic double, with the former featuring in 40 league matches.

=== Betis ===
After leaving Atlético, Solozábal signed with Real Betis. In his last season, where the Andalusian club was relegated and he was ousted from the squad for allegedly organising a riot, he ultimately took it to court for lack of payment in a suit which lasted several years, with the player having already retired.

== International career ==
Solozábal was captain of the Spanish side that won the gold medal at the 1992 Summer Olympics in Barcelona, and also earned 12 full caps in two years, the first coming on 17 April 1991 in a 2–0 friendly loss to Romania in Cáceres.

== Personal life ==
Solozábal's second son Hugo was also a professional footballer. The oldest, Iker (born 2001), was a triathlete.

== Honours ==
Atlético Madrid

- La Liga: 1995–96
- Copa del Rey: 1990–91, 1991–92, 1995–96

Spain U23

- Summer Olympic Games: 1992
