= 1995–96 Copa del Rey =

94th Copa del Rey

Tournament details
- Country: Spain
- Teams: 72

Final positions
- Champions: Atlético Madrid
- Runners-up: Barcelona

Tournament statistics
- Matches played: 141
- Goals scored: 363 (2.57 per match)
- Top goal scorer: Milinko Pantić (7)

The 1995–96 Copa del Rey was the 94th staging of the Copa del Rey.

The competition started on 6 September 1995 to 10 April 1996. The final was held at La Romareda in Zaragoza.

== First round ==
First round
Home 1st leg	Agg.	Home 2nd leg	1st leg			2nd leg			Notes
Sestao Sport	3–4	Alavés	6 September 1995	0–1		20 September 1995	3–3	Rep.	
Gramenet	1–6	Lleida	7 September 1995	0–2	Rep.	20 September 1995	4–1	Rep.	
Elche	0–1	Hércules	7 September 1995	0–1		20 September 1995	0–0	Rep.	
Endesa Andorra	4–4 (a)	Villarreal	7 September 1995	3–0	Rep.	21 September 1995	4–1	Rep.	
Beasain	1–5	Logroñés	7 September 1995	1–1		21 September 1995	4–0		
Colonia Moscardó	4–4 (a)	Leganés	7 September 1995	3–2		21 September 1995	2–1		
Utrera	1–5	Córdoba	7 September 1995	1–1		21 September 1995	4–0		
Durango	2–1	Huesca	7 September 1995	1–0		21 September 1995	1–1		
Santa Ana	1–6	Getafe	7 September 1995	0–3		21 September 1995	3–1		
Aurrerá	1–2	Eibar	7 September 1995	0–0		21 September 1995	2–1		
Real Unión	0–5	Osasuna	7 September 1995	0–1		21 September 1995	4–0		
FC Andorra	3–1	Palamós	7 September 1995	1–0	Rep.	21 September 1995	1–2	Rep.	
Castellón	1–3	Levante	7 September 1995	1–0		21 September 1995	3–0		
San Sebastián de los Reyes	2–2 (a)	Numancia	7 September 1995	2–2		21 September 1995	0–0		
Yeclano	0–2	Novelda	7 September 1995	0–0		21 September 1995	2–0		
Toledo	0–3	Valladolid	7 September 1995	0–1	Rep.	21 September 1995	2–0		
Pontevedra	2–3	Endesa As Pontes	7 September 1995	2–2		21 September 1995	1–0		
Las Palmas	2–1	Mensarejo	7 September 1995	2–1		21 September 1995	0–0		
San Pedro	2–3	Marbella	7 September 1995	2–1		21 September 1995	2–0		
Manlleu	1–3	Mallorca	7 September 1995	0–1	Rep.	21 September 1995	2–1	Rep.	
Talavera	3–3 (a)	Cultural Leonesa	7 September 1995	2–2		21 September 1995	1–1		
Extremadura	4–0	Badajoz	7 September 1995	2–0		21 September 1995	0–2		
Vélez	3–3 (a)	Real Jaén	7 September 1995	1–1		21 September 1995	2–2		
Málaga	1–1 (p)	Écija	7 September 1995	1–0		21 September 1995	1–0		
Racing Ferrol	3–1	Ourense	7 September 1995	1–0		21 September 1995	1–2		(*)
Almería	5–1	Albacete	21 September 1995	4–1		12 October 1995	0–1	Rep.	
(*) 1st leg match suspended by a power outage (71'), and resumed 19 September 1995

== Second round ==
Second round
Home 1st leg	Agg.	Home 2nd leg	1st leg			2nd leg			Notes
Racing Ferrol	1–5	Sporting Gijón	24 October 1995	1–1	Rep.	8 November 1995	4–0	Rep.	
Endesa As Pontes	1–2	Celta Vigo	25 October 1995	0–0	Rep.	7 November 1995	2–1		
Andorra	4–2	Getafe	25 October 1995	3–0	Rep.	8 November 1995	2–1	Rep.	
Extremadura	2–4	Espanyol	25 October 1995	1–1	Rep.	8 November 1995	3–1	Rep.	
Vélez	1–10	Tenerife	25 October 1995	1–2	Rep.	8 November 1995	8–0	Rep.	
Las Palmas	1–1 (a)	Leganés	25 October 1995	1–1		8 November 1995	0–0	Rep.	
Alavés	1–5	Athletic Bilbao	25 October 1995	0–1	Rep.	8 November 1995	4–1	Rep.	
Almería	2–6	Atlético Madrid	25 October 1995	1–4	Rep.	8 November 1995	2–1	Rep.	
Endesa Andorra	2–5	Levante	25 October 1995	1–1	Rep.	8 November 1995	4–1	Rep.	
Numancia	2–2 (p)	Real Sociedad	25 October 1995	2–0	Rep.	8 November 1995	2–0	Rep.	Penalties: 8–9 for CD Numancia
Logroñés	3–5	Racing Santander	25 October 1995	1–2	Rep.	8 November 1995	3–1	Rep.	
Eibar	1–2	Compostela	25 October 1995	1–0	Rep.	8 November 1995	2–0	Rep.	
Osasuna	4–7	Real Oviedo	25 October 1995	3–3	Rep.	8 November 1995	4–1	Rep.	
Córdoba	1–5	Mérida	25 October 1995	1–3	Rep.	8 November 1995	2–0	Rep.	
Lleida	1–2	Écija	25 October 1995	0–2	Rep.	8 November 1995	0–1	Rep.	
Mallorca	0–0 (p)	Valencia	25 October 1995	0–0	Rep.	8 November 1995	0–0	Rep.	Penalties: 4–1 for Valencia CF
Novelda	0–2	Hércules	25 October 1995	0–0	Rep.	8 November 1995	2–0	Rep.	
Cultural Leonesa	2–4	Valladolid	25 October 1995	1–1	Rep.	8 November 1995	3–1	Rep.	
Durango	0–6	Salamanca	25 October 1995	0–2	Rep.	8 November 1995	4–0	Rep.	
Marbella	1–3	Rayo Vallecano	25 October 1995	0–0	Rep.	9 November 1995	3–1	Rep.	

== Third round ==
Team 1	Agg.	Team 2	1st leg	2nd leg
Atlético Madrid	8–5	Mérida	4–1	4–4
Salamanca	1–3	Athletic Bilbao	0–0	1–3
Compostela	2–1	Valladolid	1–0	1–1
Leganés	1–6	Espanyol	0–1	1–5
Numancia	1–0	Racing Santander	0–0	1–0
Écija	2–5	Sporting Gijón	2–0	0–5
Levante	2–6	Tenerife	1–0	1–6
Andorra	0–7	Celta Vigo	0–5	0–2
Hércules	2–1	Rayo Vallecano	1–1	1–0
Real Oviedo	1–2	Valencia	1–1	0–1

=== First leg ===
28 November 1995	Atlético Madrid	4–1	CP Mérida	Madrid
	Kiko 48', 75'; Pantic 60', 62' (pen.)	Report (in Spanish)	Sinval 7'	Stadium: Vicente Calderón; Referee: Japón Sevilla

29 November 1995	UD Salamanca	0–0	Athletic Bilbao	Villares de la Reina
		Report (in Spanish)		Stadium: Helmántico; Referee: Gómez López

29 November 1995	SD Compostela	1–0	Real Valladolid	Santiago de Compostela
	Christensen 8'	Report (in Spanish)		Stadium: San Lázaro; Referee: Arturo Daudén Ibáñez

29 November 1995	CD Leganés	0–1	RCD Espanyol	Leganés
		Report (in Spanish)	Urzáiz 70'	Stadium: Estadio Luis Rodríguez de Miguel; Referee: Rodríguez Martel

29 November 1995	CD Numancia	0–0	Racing Santander	Soria
		Report (in Spanish)		Stadium: Estadio Municipal Los Pajaritos; Referee: Fernández Marín

29 November 1995	Écija Balompié	2–0	Sporting Gijón	Écija
	Quino 38'; Fede 75'	Report (in Spanish)		Stadium: Estadio San Pablo; Referee: Brito Arceo

29 November 1995	Levante UD	1–0	CD Tenerife	Valencia
	Guerrero 85' (pen.)	Report (in Spanish)		Stadium: Nou Estadi; Referee: José María García-Aranda

29 November 1995	FC Andorra	0–5	Celta Vigo	Andorra la Vella
		Report (in Spanish)	Alejo 1'; Milojević 10', 20', 66'; Sánchez 44'	Stadium: Estadi Comunal d'Andorra la Vella; Attendance: 1,100; Referee: Andradas Asurmendi

29 November 1995	Hércules CF	1–1	Rayo Vallecano	Alicante
	Sigüenza 53'	Report (in Spanish)	Alcázar 39'	Stadium: Estadio José Rico Pérez; Referee: Prados García

30 November 1995	Real Oviedo	1–1	Valencia CF	Oviedo
	Oli 55'	Report (in Spanish)	Mijatović 77'	Stadium: Carlos Tartiere; Attendance: 5,000; Referee: Marín López

=== Second leg ===
12 December 1995	Valencia CF	1–0	Real Oviedo	Valencia
	Berto 45' (o.g.)	Report (in Spanish)		Stadium: Mestalla; Referee: Rubio Valdivieso

13 December 1995	CP Mérida	4–4	Atlético Madrid	Mérida
	Quique Martín 27', 42', 52'; Sinval 76'	Report (in Spanish)	Pirri 12'; Correa 55', 56'; Biagini 90'	Stadium: Estadio Romano; Referee: Daudén Ibáñez

13 December 1995	Real Valladolid	1–1	SD Compostela	Valladolid
	Fernando 50'	Report (in Spanish)	Lekumberri 85'	Stadium: José Zorrilla; Attendance: 5,000; Referee: Núñez Manrique

13 December 1995	RCD Espanyol	5–1	CD Leganés	Barcelona
	Javi García 4', 32'; Àlex Fernández 14'; Pacheta 64', 73'	Report (in Spanish)	Javi López 9'	Stadium: Sarrià; Referee: Ansuátegui Roca

13 December 1995	Racing Santander	0–1	CD Numancia	Santander
		Report (in Spanish)	Barbarin 7'	Stadium: El Sardinero; Referee: López de la Fuente

13 December 1995	Sporting Gijón	5–0	Écija Balompié	Gijón
	Salinas 12', 72', 80', 83'; Velasco 60'	Report (in Spanish)		Stadium: El Molinón; Attendance: 11,000; Referee: José María García-Aranda

13 December 1995	CD Tenerife	6–1	Levante UD	Santa Cruz de Tenerife
	Hapal 7', 51'; Robaina 25'; Chano 39'; Pizzi 68'; Ramis 79'	Report (in Spanish)	Sierra 69'	Stadium: Heliodoro Rodríguez López; Referee: Manuel Mejuto González

13 December 1995	Celta Vigo	2–0	FC Andorra	Vigo
	Milojević 26', 65'	Report (in Spanish)		Stadium: Balaídos; Attendance: 7,000; Referee: Gómez López

13 December 1995	Rayo Vallecano	0–1	Hércules CF	Madrid
		Report (in Spanish)	Alfaro 12' (pen.)	Stadium: Vallecas; Attendance: 2,500; Referee: Antonio Jesús López Nieto

14 December 1995	Athletic Bilbao	3–1	UD Salamanca	Bilbao
	Etxeberria 34'; Ziganda 45', 76'	Report (in Spanish)	Barbarà 79'	Stadium: San Mamés; Referee: Manuel Díaz Vega

== Bracket ==
First round
1	(Castile and León) Numancia	2	0	2
16	(Asturias) Sporting Gijón	1	0	1
8	(Valencian Community) Hércules	0	1	1
9	(Catalonia) Barcelona	0	4	4
5	(Catalonia) Espanyol	4	1	5
12	(Community of Madrid) Real Madrid	1	2	3
4	(Basque Country (autonomous community)) Athletic Bilbao	2	1	3
13	(Aragon) Zaragoza (a)	3	0	3
6	(Andalusia) Sevilla	2	1	3
11	(Galicia (Spain)) Compostela	1	0	1
3	(Galicia (Spain)) Celta Vigo	1	0	1
14	(Valencian Community) Valencia	1	3	4
7	(Galicia (Spain)) Deportivo La Coruña	1	1	2
10	(Canary Islands) Tenerife	1	2	3
2	(Community of Madrid) Atlético Madrid	1	2	3
15	(Andalusia) Betis	1	1	2

Quarter-finals
(Castile and León) Numancia	2	1	3
(Catalonia) Barcelona	2	3	5
(Catalonia) Espanyol (a)	0	1	1
(Aragon) Zaragoza	0	1	1
(Andalusia) Sevilla	1	0	1
(Valencian Community) Valencia	1	2	3
(Canary Islands) Tenerife	0	0	0
(Community of Madrid) Atlético Madrid	0	3	3

Semi-finals
(Catalonia) Barcelona	1	3	4
(Catalonia) Espanyol	0	2	2
(Valencian Community) Valencia	3	2	5
(Community of Madrid) Atlético Madrid	5	1	6

Final
(Catalonia) Barcelona	0
(Community of Madrid) Atlético Madrid	1

== Round of 16 ==
Team 1	Agg.	Team 2	1st leg	2nd leg
Numancia (Castile and León)	2–1	(Asturias) Sporting Gijón	2–1	0–0
Hércules (Valencian Community)	1–4	(Catalonia) Barcelona	0–0	1–4
Espanyol (Catalonia)	5–3	(Community of Madrid) Real Madrid	4–1	1–2
Athletic Bilbao (Basque Country (autonomous community))	3–3 (a)	(Aragon) Zaragoza	2–3	1-0
Sevilla (Andalusia)	3–1	(Galicia (Spain)) Compostela	2–1	1-0
Celta Vigo (Galicia (Spain))	1–4	(Valencian Community) Valencia	1–1	0–3
Deportivo La Coruña (Galicia (Spain))	2–3	(Canary Islands) Tenerife	1–1	1–2
Atlético Madrid (Community of Madrid)	3–2	(Andalusia) Betis	1–1	2–1

=== First leg ===
9 January 1996	Atlético Madrid	1–1	Betis	Madrid
21:30 CET	López 6'	Report (in Spanish)	Pier 69'	Stadium: Vicente Calderón; Attendance: 20,000; Referee: Rodriguez Martel (Canary Islands)

10 January 1996	Athletic Bilbao	2–3	Zaragoza	Bilbao
20:15 CET	Guerrero 43'; Etxeberria 51'	Report (in Spanish)	Morientes 8', 28', 52'	Stadium: San Mamés; Attendance: 30,000; Referee: Rubio Valdivieso (Castile and León)

10 January 1996	Numancia	2–1	Sporting Gijón	Soria
20:30 CET	Artigas 46'; Murillo 64'	Report (in Spanish)	Eloy 17'	Stadium: Los Pajaritos; Attendance: — Referee: Puentes Leira (Galicia (Spain))

10 January 1996	Celta Vigo	1–1	Valencia	Vigo
21:00 CET	Sánchez 63'	Report (in Spanish)	Fernando 12'	Stadium: Balaídos; Attendance: — Referee: Esquinas Torres (Community of Madrid) (substituted off) 77'; Referee: Ignacio Iglesias (Galicia (Spain)) (substituted on) 77'

10 January 1996	Deportivo La Coruña	1–1	Tenerife	A Coruña
21:00 CET	Donato 85' (pen.)	Report (in Spanish)	Pizzi 31' (pen.)	Stadium: Riazor; Attendance: — Referee: Prados García (Andalusia)

10 January 1996	Hércules	0–0	Barcelona	Alicante
21:15 CET		Report (in Spanish)		Stadium: José Rico Pérez; Attendance: 29,000; Referee: Barrenechea Montero (Castile and León)

10 January 1996	Sevilla	2–1	Compostela	Seville
21:30 CET	Marcos 56'; Šuker 77'	Report (in Spanish)	Tocornal 90+2'	Stadium: Ramón Sánchez Pizjuán; Attendance: 25,000; Referee: Díaz Vega (Asturias)

11 January 1996	Espanyol	4–1	Real Madrid	Barcelona
21:30 CET	Lardín 1', 56', 63'; Arteaga 6'	Report (in Spanish)	Redondo 90'	Stadium: Sarrià; Attendance: 22,000; Referee: Marín López (La Rioja)

=== Second leg ===
16 January 1996	Betis	1–2	Atlético Madrid	Seville
21:30 CET	Sabas 47'	Report (in Spanish)	Geli 24'; Penev 26'	Stadium: Benito Villamarín; Attendance: — Referee: Rubio Valdivieso (Castile and León)

17 January 1996	Zaragoza	0–1	Athletic Bilbao	Zaragoza
20:30 CET		Report (in Spanish)	Etxeberria 83'	Stadium: La Romareda; Attendance: 18,000; Referee: Ansuátegui Roca (Valencian Community)

17 January 1996	Compostela	0–1	Sevilla	Santiago de Compostela
20:30 CET		Report (in Spanish)	Carlitos 2'	Stadium: Multiusos de San Lázaro; Attendance: — Referee: Gracia Redondo (Aragon)

17 January 1996	Sporting Gijón	0–0	Numancia	Gijón
20:45 CET		Report (in Spanish)		Stadium: El Molinón; Attendance: 11,700; Referee: Megía Dávila (Community of Madrid)

17 January 1996	Valencia	3–0	Celta Vigo	Valencia
21:00 CET	Mijatović 21' (pen.); Arroyo 36'; Gálvez 56'	Report (in Spanish)		Stadium: Mestalla; Attendance: 45,000; Referee: Japón Sevilla (Andalusia)

17 January 1996	Barcelona	4–1	Hércules	Barcelona
21:00 CET	Bakero 14'; Abelardo 44'; Kodro 52'; Amor 70'	Report (in Spanish)	Palomino 47'	Stadium: Camp Nou; Attendance: 35,000; Referee: Iturralde González (Basque Country (autonomous community))

17 January 1996	Tenerife	2–1	Deportivo La Coruña	Santa Cruz de Tenerife
22:00 CET	Juanele 40'; Jokanović 48'	Report (in Spanish)	Donato 27'	Stadium: Heliodoro Rodríguez López; Attendance: 18,000; Referee: López Nieto (Andalusia)

18 January 1996	Real Madrid	2–1	Espanyol	Madrid
21:30 CET	Raúl 68'; Michel 88' (pen.)	Report (in Spanish)	Lardín 8'	Stadium: Santiago Bernabéu; Attendance: 45,000; Referee: Fernández Marín (Valencian Community)

== Quarter-finals ==
Team 1	Agg.	Team 2	1st leg	2nd leg
Numancia (Castile and León)	3–5	(Catalonia) Barcelona	2–2	1–3
Espanyol (Catalonia)	1–1 (a)	(Aragon) Zaragoza	0–0	1–1
Sevilla (Andalusia)	1–3	(Valencian Community) Valencia	1–1	0–2
Tenerife (Canary Islands)	0–3	(Community of Madrid) Atlético Madrid	0–0	0–3

=== First leg ===
30 January 1996	Sevilla	1–1	Valencia	Seville
21:30 CET	Monchu 19'	Report (in Spanish)	Mijatović 33' (pen.)	Stadium: Ramón Sánchez Pizjuán; Attendance: — Referee: Gracia Redondo (Aragon)

31 January 1996	Espanyol	0–0	Zaragoza	Barcelona
21:00 CET		Report (in Spanish)		Stadium: Sarrià; Attendance: 18,000; Referee: Esquinas Torres (Community of Madrid)

31 January 1996	Tenerife	0–0	Atlético Madrid	Santa Cruz de Tenerife
23:00 CET		Report (in Spanish)		Stadium: Heliodoro Rodríguez López; Attendance: 22,000; Referee: Díaz Vega (Asturias)

1 February 1996	Numancia	2–2	Barcelona	Soria
21:30 CET	Alonso 1'; Movilla 89'	Report (in Spanish)	Moreno 49', 55'	Stadium: Los Pajaritos; Attendance: 12,200; Referee: López Nieto (Andalusia)

=== Second leg ===
13 February 1996	Valencia	2–0	Sevilla	Valencia
21:30 CET	Mijatović 32', 68'	Report (in Spanish)		Stadium: Mestalla; Attendance: 49,000; Referee: Díaz Vega (Asturias)

14 February 1996	Zaragoza	1–1	Espanyol	Zaragoza
20:00 CET	López 19'	Report (in Spanish)	Pacheta 7'	Stadium: La Romareda; Attendance: 15,000; Referee: Marín López (La Rioja)

14 February 1996	Barcelona	3–1	Numancia	Barcelona
22:00 CET	Kodro 23'; Óscar 26'; Nadal 60'	Report (in Spanish)	Barbarin 5'	Stadium: Camp Nou; Attendance: 60,000; Referee: García-Aranda (Community of Madrid)

15 February 1996	Atlético Madrid	3–0	Tenerife	Madrid
21:30 CET	Penev 18', 41', 76'	Report (in Spanish)		Stadium: Vicente Calderón; Attendance: 15,000; Referee: Gracia Redondo (Aragon)

== Semi-finals ==
Team 1	Agg.	Team 2	1st leg	2nd leg
Barcelona (Catalonia)	4–2	(Catalonia) Espanyol	1–0	3–2
Valencia (Valencian Community)	5–6	(Community of Madrid) Atlético Madrid	3–5	2–1

=== First leg ===
21 February 1996	Valencia	3–5	Atlético Madrid	Valencia
21:30 CET	Gálvez 6'; Fernando 44'; Mijatović 90'	Report (in Spanish)	Pantić 47', 64'; Biagini 72'; Juan Carlos 80'; Roberto 88'	Stadium: Mestalla; Attendance: — Referee: López Nieto (Andalusia)

22 February 1996	Barcelona	1–0	Espanyol	Barcelona
21:30 CET	Popescu 51' (pen.)	Report (in Spanish)		Stadium: Camp Nou; Attendance: 80,000; Referee: García-Aranda (Community of Madrid)

=== Second leg ===
28 February 1996	Espanyol	2–3	Barcelona	Barcelona
21:30 CET	García 38'; Urzaiz 62' (pen.)	Report (in Spanish)	Kodro 41'; Amor 79'; Popescu 89'	Stadium: Sarrià; Attendance: 41,000; Referee: Díaz Vega (Asturias)

29 February 1996	Atlético Madrid	1–2	Valencia	Madrid
21:30 CET	Pantić 45' (pen.)	Report (in Spanish)	Viola 20'; Fernando 53'	Stadium: Vicente Calderón; Attendance: 25,000; Referee: Gracia Redondo (Aragon)

== Final ==
10 April 1996
20:30 CET

Barcelona	0–1 (a.e.t.)	Atlético Madrid
	Report (in Spanish)	Pantić 102'

La Romareda, Zaragoza
Attendance: 37,000
Referee: Díaz Vega (Asturias)

Copa del Rey
1995–96 winners
Atlético Madrid
9th title

== Top goalscorers ==
Player	Goals	Team
(Federal Republic of Yugoslavia) Milinko Pantić	7	Atlético Madrid
(Federal Republic of Yugoslavia) Predrag Mijatović	6	Valencia
(Bulgaria) Lyuboslav Penev	6	Atlético Madrid
(Argentina) Juan Antonio Pizzi	5	Tenerife
(Spain) Pacheta	5	Espanyol
(Federal Republic of Yugoslavia) Goran Milojević	5	Celta Vigo
(Spain) Javi García	4	Espanyol
(Spain) Jordi Lardín	4	Espanyol
(Spain) Quique Martín	4	Mérida
(Spain) Víctor	4	Tenerife
