= Kiko (footballer, born 1972) =

Spanish footballer

Personal information
- Full name: Francisco Miguel Narváez Machón
- Date of birth: 26 April 1972 (age 54)
- Place of birth: Jerez de la Frontera, Spain
- Height: 1.89 m (6 ft 2 in)
- Position: Centre-forward

Youth career
- Pueblo Nuevo
- 1985–1989: Cádiz

Senior career*
| Years | Team | Apps | (Gls) |
| 1989–1991 | Cádiz B | 63 | (30) |
| 1991–1993 | Cádiz | 78 | (12) |
| 1993–2001 | Atlético Madrid | 225 | (48) |
| 2002 | Extremadura | 11 | (1) |
| Total | | 377 | (91) |

International career
| 1991 | Spain U19 | 1 | (0) |
| 1992–1994 | Spain U21 | 5 | (2) |
| 1991–1992 | Spain U23 | 12 | (7) |
| 1992–1998 | Spain | 26 | (4) |
Medal record
Representing Spain
Men's Football
| Gold medal – first place | 1992 Barcelona | Team competition |
UEFA European Under-21 Championship
| Bronze medal – third place | 1994 France |
- * Club domestic league appearances and goals

Francisco Miguel Narváez Machón (born 26 April 1972), known as Kiko, is a Spanish former professional footballer who played as a centre-forward, mostly for Atlético Madrid.

Over ten La Liga seasons (also played one year with his main club in the Segunda División), he amassed totals of 271 games and 60 goals. He started his career with Cádiz.

Kiko was a squad member at the 1992 Summer Olympics, where the Spain national team won gold on home soil. Additionally, he appeared at full level at the 1998 World Cup and Euro 1996.

== Club career ==
=== Cádiz ===
Born in Jerez de la Frontera, Province of Cádiz, Kiko's career began with local Cádiz CF, and he first appeared in La Liga on 14 April 1991 in a 2–3 home loss against Athletic Bilbao. Even though he played only five further matches in the season he was intimately connected with the Andalusia club's fate as, on 9 June, in only 25 minutes on the pitch, he was awarded a penalty kick and scored an 83rd-minute winner in the 2–1 home win over Real Zaragoza; the team would miraculously retain their status in the playoffs against CD Málaga.

=== Atlético Madrid ===
After two more seasons as an undisputed starter, Kiko moved alongside his teammate José María Quevedo to Atlético Madrid, upon Cádiz's 1993 relegation. There, he developed into one of Spain's most important footballers during the 90s, being instrumental in the side's historic double in 1995–96 with 11 goals and several assists.

Atlético were relegated in 2000, but Kiko stayed at the Vicente Calderón Stadium for a further campaign, not managing to find the net in 32 appearances. He finished out his career with a five-month spell at CF Extremadura also in the Segunda División in 2002, teaming up with another longtime league player, Pier.

== International career ==
Kiko was capped 26 times for Spain, and scored four goals. His debut came on 16 December 1992, in a 1994 FIFA World Cup qualifier against Latvia where he played the full 90 minutes.

Kiko took part in UEFA Euro 1996 and the 1998 World Cup. He scored in a 6–1 rout of Bulgaria in the latter tournament, though this amounted to nothing as Spain were knocked out in the group stage.

Previously, Kiko represented the country at the 1992 Summer Olympics in Barcelona. He scored a last-minute winner against Poland in the final, a 3–2 victory, his second of the game.

=== International goals ===
Scores and results list Spain's goal tally first, score column indicates score after each Kiko goal.

List of international goals scored by Kiko
| No. | Date | Venue | Opponent | Score | Result | Competition |
|---|---|---|---|---|---|---|
| 1 | 15 November 1995 | Estadio Martínez Valero, Elche, Spain | North Macedonia | 1–0 | 3–0 | UEFA Euro 1996 qualifying |
| 2 | 7 February 1996 | Estadio Insular, Las Palmas, Spain | Norway | 1–0 | 1–0 | Friendly |
| 3 | 24 September 1997 | Tehelné pole, Bratislava, Slovakia | Slovakia | 1–0 | 2–1 | 1998 FIFA World Cup qualification |
| 4 | 24 June 1998 | Stade Bollaert-Delelis, Lens, France | Bulgaria | 6–1 | 6–1 | 1998 FIFA World Cup |

== Style of play ==
Technically gifted, Kiko excelled at playing with his back to the opposition's goal. In spite of being almost 1,90m, his aerial ability was considered poor; he celebrated scoring a goal by imitating an archer.

== Honours ==
Atlético Madrid

- La Liga: 1995–96
- Copa del Rey: 1995–96

Spain U23

- Summer Olympic Games: 1992

Spain U21

- UEFA European Under-21 Championship third place: 1994
