= 2000–01 Olympique Lyonnais season =

Lyon
2000–01 season
- Owner: OL Groupe
- President: Jean-Michel Aulas
- Head coach: Jacques Santini
- Stadium: Stade de Gerland
- Division 1: 2nd
- Coupe de France: Quarter-finals
- Coupe de la Ligue: Winners
- UEFA Champions League: Second group stage
- Top goalscorer: League: Sonny Anderson (22); All: Sonny Anderson (27)
- Average home league attendance: 34,565
Home colours	Away colours	Third colours

The 2000–01 season was the 102nd season in the existence of Olympique Lyonnais and the club's 12th consecutive season in the top flight of French football. They participated in the Ligue 1, the Coupe de France, the Coupe de la Ligue and the UEFA Champions League.

== First-team squad ==
Squad at end of season

Note: Flags indicate national team as defined under FIFA eligibility rules; some limited exceptions apply. Players may hold more than one non-FIFA nationality.

No.	Pos.	Nation	Player
1	GK	FRA	Grégory Coupet
2	DF	BEL	Éric Deflandre
3	DF	BRA	Edmílson
4	DF	FRA	Florent Laville
5	DF	POL	Jacek Bąk
6	MF	FRA	Philippe Violeau
7	FW	FRA	Steve Marlet
8	MF	FRA	Pierre Laigle
9	FW	BRA	Sonny Anderson (captain)
10	MF	FRA	Vikash Dhorasoo
12	DF	FRA	Serge Blanc
13	FW	FRA	Patrice Loko (on loan from Montpellier)

No.	Pos.	Nation	Player
14	FW	FRA	Sidney Govou
15	DF	BEL	Christophe Delmotte
17	MF	CMR	Marc-Vivien Foé
18	MF	FRA	Steed Malbranque
19	DF	FRA	Jean-Marc Chanelet
21	DF	SUI	Patrick Müller
22	MF	FRA	David Linarès
24	DF	FRA	Fréderic Ribeiro
26	DF	FRA	Jérémie Bréchet
30	GK	FRA	Angelo Hugues
31	DF	BRA	Caçapa (on loan from Atlético Mineiro)

== Transfers ==
=== Loans in ===
Date from	Date to	Pos.	No.	Name	From	Ref.
28 January 2001	End of season	FW	13	(France) Patrice Loko	(France) Montpellier	
28 January 2001	End of season	DF	31	(Brazil) Caçapa	(Brazil) Atlético Mineiro	

== Pre-season and friendlies ==
21 July 2000 Friendly	Lyon (France)	1–1	(Portugal) Benfica	Lyon, France
19:30	Kandaurov 36' (o.g.)	Report	Sabry 58'	Stadium: Stade de Gerland; Attendance: 48,000

== Competitions ==
=== Overall record ===
Competition	First match	Last match	Starting round	Final position	Record							
Competition	First match	Last match	Starting round	Final position	Pld	W	D	L	GF	GA	GD	Win %
Division 1	29 July 2000	19 May 2001	Matchday 1	2nd	34	17	13	4	57	30	+27	50.00
Coupe de France	20 January 2000	1 April 2001	Round of 64	Quarter-finals	4	1	2	1	5	7	−2	25.00
Coupe de la Ligue	6 January 2001	5 May 2001	Round of 32	Winners	5	5	0	0	12	5	+7	100.00
UEFA Champions League	7 August 2000	14 March 2001	Third qualifying round	Second group stage	14	7	2	5	20	12	+8	50.00
Total					57	30	17	10	94	54	+40	52.63

Last updated: 19 May 2021
Source: BDFutbol

=== Division 1 ===
==== League table ====
Pos	Team	Pld	W	D	L	GF	GA	GD	Pts	Qualification or relegation
1	Nantes (C)	34	21	5	8	58	36	+22	68	Qualification to Champions League first group stage
2	Lyon	34	17	13	4	57	30	+27	64	Qualification to Champions League first group stage
3	Lille	34	16	11	7	43	27	+16	59	Qualification to Champions League third qualifying round
4	Bordeaux	34	15	12	7	48	33	+15	57	Qualification to UEFA Cup first round
5	Sedan	34	14	10	10	47	40	+7	52	Qualification to UEFA Cup first round

Source: Ligue 1
Rules for classification: 1) points; 2) goal difference; 3) number of goals scored.
(C) Champions

==== Results summary ====
Overall								Home						Away					
Pld	W	D	L	GF	GA	GD	Pts	W	D	L	GF	GA	GD	W	D	L	GF	GA	GD
34	17	13	4	57	30	+27	64	10	5	2	32	14	+18	7	8	2	25	16	+9

Last updated: 19 May 2001.
Source: BDFutbol

==== Results by round ====
Round	1	2	3	4	5	6	7	8	9	10	11	12	13	14	15	16	17	18	19	20	21	22	23	24	25	26	27	28	29	30	31	32	33	34
Ground	H	A	H	A	H	A	H	A	H	A	H	A	H	A	A	H	A	H	A	H	A	H	A	H	A	H	A	H	A	H	H	A	H	A
Result	D	D	D	L	W	D	W	W	L	D	W	D	D	W	D	L	W	D	D	W	L	W	D	W	W	D	D	W	W	W	W	W	W	W
Position	6	10	11	14	12	13	9	5	9	8	5	6	8	4	5	8	7	7	7	5	7	5	5	4	3	5	5	4	3	3	2	2	2	2

Source: BDFutbol
A = Away; H = Home; W = Win; D = Draw; L = Loss

==== Matches ====
29 July 2000 1	Lyon	2–2	Rennes	Lyon
20:00 CEST (UTC+2)	Vairelles 57'; Anderson 88'		Coupet 4' (o.g.); Grégoire 11'	Stadium: Stade de Gerland; Attendance: 33,669; Referee: Alain Hamer

3 August 2000 2	Sedan	1–1	Lyon	Sedan
20:00 CEST (UTC+2)	N'Diefi 86'		Marlet 82'	Stadium: Stade Louis Dugauguez; Attendance: 12,087; Referee: Gilles Veissière

12 August 2000 3	Lyon	0–0	Metz	Lyon
20:00 CEST (UTC+2)				Stadium: Stade de Gerland; Attendance: 29,268; Referee: Claude Colombo

18 August 2000 4	Bastia	2–0	Lyon	Furiani
20:45 CEST (UTC+2)	Lachuer 53'; André 61'			Stadium: Stade Armand Cesari; Attendance: 9,927; Referee: Alain Sars

26 August 2000 5	Lyon	1–0	Troyes	Lyon
20:00 CEST (UTC+2)	Foé 90'			Stadium: Stade de Gerland; Attendance: 28,103; Referee: Laurent Duhamel

6 September 2000 6	Saint-Étienne	2–2	Lyon	Saint-Étienne
20:00 CEST (UTC+2)	Pédron 12'; Potillon 51'		Anderson 10'; Marlet 41'	Stadium: Stade Geoffroy-Guichard; Attendance: 28,446; Referee: Claude Colombo

9 September 2000 7	Lyon	3–0	Lens	Lyon
20:00 CEST (UTC+2)	Anderson 53'; Marlet 61', 86'			Stadium: Stade de Gerland; Attendance: 34,529; Referee: Bruno Coué

17 September 2000 8	Nantes	0–1	Lyon	Nantes
18:30 CEST (UTC+2)			Anderson 45'	Stadium: Stade de la Beaujoire; Attendance: 26,869; Referee: Pascal Garibian

23 September 2000 9	Lyon	0–1	Guingamp	Lyon
20:00 CEST (UTC+2)			Fiorèse 89'	Stadium: Stade de Gerland; Attendance: 32,936; Referee: Patrick Lhermite

1 October 2000 10	Marseille	1–1	Lyon	Marseille
20:45 CEST (UTC+2)	Belmadi 7'		Anderson 52' (pen.)	Stadium: Stade Vélodrome; Attendance: 48,729; Referee: Philippe Kalt

21 October 2000 12	Bordeaux	1–1	Lyon	Bordeaux
20:00 CEST (UTC+2)	Wilmots 10'		Anderson 45'	Stadium: Stade Chaban-Delmas; Attendance: 30,107; Referee: Stéphane Bré

29 October 2000 13	Lyon	2–2	Auxerre	Lyon
19:00 CET (UTC+2)	Govou 29', 90+2'		Guivarc'h 28'; Tainio 63'	Stadium: Stade de Gerland; Attendance: 36,339; Referee: Bruno Ruffray

3 November 2000 14	Monaco	0–2	Lyon	Monaco
20:45 CET (UTC+2)			Laigle 4'; Marlet 80'	Stadium: Stade Louis II; Attendance: 10,408; Referee: Stéphane Moulin

11 November 2000 15	Paris Saint-Germain	1–1	Lyon	Paris
17:15 CET (UTC+2)	Robert 41' (pen.)		Marlet 44'	Stadium: Parc des Princes; Attendance: 43,591; Referee: Laurent Duhamel

18 November 2000 16	Lyon	0–1	Lille	Lyon
20:00 CET (UTC+2)			Landrin 73'	Stadium: Stade de Gerland; Attendance: 32,948; Referee: Gilles Veissière

25 November 2000 17	Strasbourg	0–3	Lyon	Strasbourg
20:00 CET (UTC+2)			Dhorasoo 15'; Vairelles 32'; Anderson 62'	Stadium: Stade de la Meinau; Attendance: 14,025; Referee: Pascal Viléo

29 November 2000 18	Lyon	2–2	Sedan	Lyon
20:00 CET (UTC+2)	Marlet 67'; Anderson 86'		N'Diefi 47'; Mionnet 52'	Stadium: Stade de Gerland; Attendance: 28,284; Referee: Bertrand Layec

2 December 2000 19	Metz	0–0	Lyon	Metz
17:15 CET (UTC+2)				Stadium: Stade Saint-Symphorien; Attendance: 16,218; Referee: Bruno Coué

9 December 2000 20	Lyon	1–0	Bastia	Lyon
20:00 CET (UTC+2)	Marlet 31'			Stadium: Stade de Gerland; Attendance: 35,853; Referee: Pascal Garibian

13 December 2000 11	Lyon	4–1	Toulouse	Lyon
20:00 CET (UTC+2)	Govou 5'; Edmílson 47'; Vairelles 61'; Malbranque 71'		Bonilla 90' (pen.)	Stadium: Stade de Gerland; Attendance: 30,129; Referee: Damien Ledentu

16 December 2000 21	Troyes	1–0	Lyon	Troyes
20:00 CET (UTC+2)	Edmílson 40' (o.g.)			Stadium: Stade de l'Aube; Attendance: 13,872; Referee: Bruno Derrien

21 December 2000 22	Lyon	2–1	Saint-Étienne	Lyon
20:00 CET (UTC+2)	Anderson 4'; Delmotte 90'		Dias 70'	Stadium: Stade de Gerland; Attendance: 38,959; Referee: Alain Sars

12 January 2001 23	Lens	0–0	Lyon	Lens
20:45 CET (UTC+1)				Stadium: Stade Félix-Bollaert; Attendance: 36,018; Referee: Bertrand Layec

27 January 2001 24	Lyon	3–1	Nantes	Lyon
17:15 CET (UTC+2)	Dhorasoo 17', 70'; Malbranque 59'		Gillet 55'	Stadium: Stade de Gerland; Attendance: 35,518; Referee: Gilles Veissière

3 February 2001 25	Guingamp	2–3	Lyon	Guingamp
20:00 CET (UTC+2)	Rodriguez 8', 73' (pen.)		Violeau 7'; Anderson 12', 90+4'	Stadium: Stade du Roudourou; Attendance: 13,287; Referee: Bruno Ruffray

6 February 2001 26	Lyon	1–1	Marseille	Lyon
20:45 CET (UTC+2)	Anderson 52' (pen.)		Leroy 76'	Stadium: Stade de Gerland; Attendance: 37,093; Referee: Damien Ledentu

17 February 2001 27	Toulouse	1–1	Lyon	Toulouse
20:00 CET (UTC+2)	Bonilla 84'		Anderson 40'	Stadium: Stadium de Toulouse; Attendance: 21,087; Referee: Stéphane Moulin

3 March 2001 28	Lyon	2–1	Bordeaux	Lyon
17:15 CET (UTC+2)	Marlet 48'; Anderson 81'		Vairelles 5'	Stadium: Stade de Gerland; Attendance: 35,445; Referee: Alain Sars

17 March 2001 29	Auxerre	0–3	Lyon	Auxerre
20:00 CET (UTC+2)			Anderson 18', 66' (pen.); Govou 83'	Stadium: Stade Abbé-Deschamps; Attendance: 11,544; Referee: Stéphane Bré

7 April 2001 30	Lyon	2–1	Monaco	Lyon
17:15 CEST (UTC+2)	Anderson 57' (pen.); Caçapa 90+4'		Nonda 76'	Stadium: Stade de Gerland; Attendance: 39,529; Referee: Bruno Derrien

15 April 2001 31	Lyon	2–0	Paris Saint-Germain	Lyon
20:45 CEST (UTC+2)	Anderson 44'; Marlet 81'			Stadium: Stade de Gerland; Attendance: 38,366; Referee: Stéphane Moulin

28 April 2001 32	Lille	1–2	Lyon	Lille
20:00 CEST (UTC+2)	Ecker 23'		Anderson 25'; Delmotte 90+1'	Stadium: Stade Grimonprez-Jooris; Attendance: 19,466; Referee: Pascal Garibian

12 May 2001 33	Lyon	5–0	Strasbourg	Lyon
20:00 CEST (UTC+2)	Anderson 18'; Müller 43'; Govou 73'; Chanelet 89'; Marlet 90+2'			Stadium: Stade de Gerland; Attendance: 40,629; Referee: Bruno Coué

19 May 2001 34	Rennes	3–4	Lyon	Rennes
20:00 CEST (UTC+2)	Le Roux 11', 37'; Chapuis 32'		Anderson 20', 75'; Echouafni 38' (o.g.); Marlet 78'	Stadium: Stade de la Route de Lorient; Attendance: 22,498; Referee: Gilles Veissière

=== Coupe de France ===
20 January 2001 Round of 64	Lyon	3–2	Caen	Lyon
20:00 CET (UTC+1)	Müller 23'; Anderson 41', 70'		Garcion 16'; Govou 67' (o.g.)	Stadium: Stade de Gerland; Attendance: 7,000; Referee: Laurent Duhamel

9 February 2001 Round of 32	Lyon	1–1 (a.e.t.) (4–3 p)	Saint-Étienne	Lyon
20:00 CET (UTC+1)	Loko 52'		Fellahi 59'	Stadium: Stade de Gerland; Attendance: 31,911; Referee: Pascal Garibian
	Penalties
	Anderson (penalty scored); Edmílson (penalty missed); Malbranque (penalty scored); Delmotte (penalty scored); Violeau (penalty scored)		(penalty scored) Huard; (penalty scored) Guel; (penalty scored) Carteron; (penalty missed) Sarr; (penalty missed) Potillon

10 March 2001 Round of 16	Vendée Fontenay Foot	2–2 (a.e.t.) (4–5 p)	Lyon	Niort
20:00 CET (UTC+1)	Lion 63'; Ducourneau 118'		Govou 85'; Delmotte 95'	Stadium: Stade René Gaillard; Attendance: 10,000; Referee: Patrick Lhermite

1 April 2001 Quarter-finals	Strasbourg	3–0	Lyon	Strasbourg
20:00 CEST (UTC+2)	Johansen 79'; Ljuboja 84'; Luyindula 89'			Stadium: Stade de la Meinau; Attendance: 13,158; Referee: Alain Sars

=== Coupe de la Ligue ===
6 January 2001 Round of 32	Sedan	1–2	Lyon	Sedan
20:45 CET (UTC+1)	N'Diefi 52'		Anderson 31'; Govou 82'	Stadium: Stade Louis Dugauguez; Attendance: 12,044; Referee: Claude Colombo

31 January 2001 Round of 16	Lens	1–3	Lyon	Lens
20:30 CET (UTC+1)	Fuertes 26'		Edmílson 25'; Laigle 60'; Marlet 71'	Stadium: Stade Félix Bollaert; Attendance: 29,943; Referee: Stéphane Bré

24 February 2001 Quarter-finals	Amiens	0–2	Lyon	Amiens
20:30 CET (UTC+1)			Malbranque 18', 61'	Stadium: Stade de la Licorne; Attendance: 10,997; Referee: Bruno Coué

10 April 2001 Semi-finals	Lyon	3–2	Nantes	Lyon
20:45 CEST (UTC+2)	Laigle 5', 64'; Anderson 54'		Ziani 4'; Vahirua 10'	Stadium: Stade de Gerland; Attendance: 30,558; Referee: Gilles Veissière

5 May 2001 Final	Monaco	1–2 (a.e.t.)	Lyon	Saint-Denis
20:45 CEST (UTC+2)	Nonda 64'		Caçapa 35'; Müller 118'	Stadium: Stade de France; Attendance: 78,010; Referee: Stéphane Bré

=== UEFA Champions League ===
==== Third qualifying round ====
7 August 2000 First leg	Inter Bratislava (Slovakia)	1–2	(France) Lyon	Bratislava, Slovakia
18:00 CEST (UTC+2)	Németh 75'	Report	Anderson 50'; Delmotte 90'	Stadium: Štadión Pasienky; Attendance: 3,540; Referee: Tomasz Mikulski (Poland)

22 August 2000 Second leg	Lyon (France)	2–1 (4–2 agg.)	(Slovakia) Inter Bratislava	Lyon, France
20:00 CEST (UTC+2)	Marlet 55'; Malbranque 89'	Report	Pinte 36'	Stadium: Stade de Gerland; Attendance: 20,318; Referee: Roelof Luinge (Netherlands)

==== First group stage ====
Pos	Team	Pld	W	D	L	GF	GA	GD	Pts	Qualification	VAL	LYO	OLY	HVN
1	(Spain) Valencia	6	4	1	1	7	4	+3	13	Advance to second group stage	—	1–0	2–1	1–1
2	(France) Lyon	6	3	0	3	8	6	+2	9	Advance to second group stage	1–2	—	1–0	3–1
3	(Greece) Olympiacos	6	3	0	3	6	5	+1	9	Transfer to UEFA Cup	1–0	2–1	—	2–0
4	(Netherlands) Heerenveen	6	1	1	4	3	9	−6	4		0–1	0–2	1–0	—

Source: UEFA

12 September 2000 1	Lyon (France)	3–1	(Netherlands) Heerenveen	Lyon, France
20:45 CEST (UTC+2)	Anderson 2'; Houttuin 10' (o.g.); Marlet 58'	Report	Talan 35'	Stadium: Stade de Gerland; Attendance: 22,687; Referee: Stuart Dougal (Scotland)

20 September 2000 2	Olympiacos (Greece)	2–1	(Netherlands) Lyon	Athens, Greece
20:45 CEST (UTC+2)	Ofori-Quaye 19'; Giovanni 34'	Report	Foé 88'	Stadium: Olympic Stadium; Attendance: 69,048; Referee: Graham Poll (England)

27 September 2000 3	Valencia (Spain)	1–0	(Netherlands) Lyon	Valencia, Spain
20:45 CEST (UTC+2)	Zahovič 78'	Report		Stadium: Mestalla; Attendance: 30,720; Referee: Stefano Braschi (Italy)

17 October 2000 4	Lyon (France)	1–2	(Spain) Valencia	Lyon, France
20:45 CEST (UTC+2)	Marlet 90'	Report	Juan Sánchez 45+1'; Baraja 86'	Stadium: Stade de Gerland; Attendance: 37,669; Referee: Paul Durkin (England)

25 October 2000 5	Heerenveen (Netherlands)	0–2	(Netherlands) Lyon	Heerenveen, Netherlands
20:45 CEST (UTC+2)			Malbranque 68'; Marlet 78'	Stadium: Abe Lenstra Stadion; Attendance: 14,300; Referee: Lucílio Batista (Portugal)

7 November 2000 6	Lyon (France)	1–0	(Greece) Olympiacos	Lyon, France
20:45 CET (UTC+1)	Laigle 2'	Report		Stadium: Stade de Gerland; Attendance: 37,908; Referee: Günter Benkö (Austria)

==== Second group stage ====
Pos	Team	Pld	W	D	L	GF	GA	GD	Pts	Qualification	BAY	ARS	LYO	SPM
1	(Germany) Bayern Munich	6	4	1	1	8	5	+3	13	Advance to knockout stage	—	1–0	1–0	1–0
2	(England) Arsenal	6	2	2	2	6	8	−2	8	Advance to knockout stage	2–2	—	1–1	1–0
3	(France) Lyon	6	2	2	2	8	4	+4	8		3–0	0–1	—	3–0
4	(Russia) Spartak Moscow	6	1	1	4	5	10	−5	4		0–3	4–1	1–1	—

Source: UEFA

22 November 2000 1	Bayern Munich (Germany)	1–0	(Netherlands) Lyon	Munich, Germany
20:45 CET (UTC+1)	Jeremies 55'	Report		Stadium: Olympiastadion; Attendance: 18,000; Referee: José García-Aranda (Spain)

5 December 2000 2	Lyon (France)	3–0	(Russia) Spartak Moscow	Lyon, France
20:45 CET (UTC+1)	Marlet 2'; Anderson 31', 42'	Report		Stadium: Stade de Gerland; Attendance: 38,404; Referee: Juan Fernández Marin (Spain)

13 February 2001 3	Lyon (France)	0–1	(England) Arsenal	Lyon, France
20:45 CET (UTC+1)		Report	Henry 59'	Stadium: Stade de Gerland; Attendance: 39,514; Referee: Urs Meier (Switzerland)

21 February 2001 4	Arsenal (England)	1–1	(France) Lyon	London, England
20:45 CET (UTC+1)	Bergkamp 33'	Report	Edmílson 90'	Stadium: Highbury; Attendance: 34,303; Referee: Ľuboš Micheľ (Slovakia)

6 March 2001 5	Lyon (France)	3–0	(Germany) Bayern Munich	Lyon, France
20:45 CET (UTC+1)	Govou 13', 20'; Laigle 71'	Report		Stadium: Stade de Gerland; Attendance: 39,458; Referee: Dick Jol (Netherlands)

14 March 2001 6	Spartak Moscow (Russia)	1–1	(France) Lyon	Moscow, Russia
18:55 CET (UTC+1)	Parfenov 4' (pen.)	Report	Anderson 68' (pen.)	Stadium: Luzhniki Stadium; Attendance: 8,500; Referee: Kyros Vassaras (Greece)

== Statistics ==
=== Goalscorers ===
Rank	No.	Pos.	Nat.	Player	Division 1	Coupe de France	Coupe de la Ligue	Champions League	Total
1	9	FW	(Brazil)	Sonny Anderson	22	0	0	5	27
2	7	FW	(France)	Steve Marlet	12	0	0	5	17
3	14	FW	(France)	Sidney Govou	5	0	0	2	7
Own goals					0	0	0	0	0
Totals					57	5	12	20	94
