= 2001–02 Olympique Lyonnais season =

Lyon
2001–02 season
- Owner: OL Groupe
- President: Jean-Michel Aulas
- Head coach: Jacques Santini
- Stadium: Stade de Gerland
- Division 1: 1st
- Coupe de France: Round of 32
- Coupe de la Ligue: Round of 16
- Champions League: Group stage
- UEFA Cup: Fourth round
- Top goalscorer: League: Sonny Anderson (14); All: Sonny Anderson (18)
- Highest home attendance: 39,691 vs. Lens (4 May 2002)
- Lowest home attendance: 4,000 vs. Châteauroux (19 January 2002)
- Average home league attendance: 34,843
Home colours	Away colours	Third colours

The 2001–02 season was the 103rd season in the existence of Olympique Lyonnais and the club's 13th consecutive season in the top flight of French football. They participated in the French Division 1, the Coupe de France, the Coupe de la Ligue, UEFA Champions League and UEFA Cup.

== Season summary ==
Lyon won their first ever French top-flight title. The title race came down to the final day of the season, with Lyon needing victory against fellow challengers Lens, who were one point ahead. A 3–1 victory secured Lyon's title win. The club would go on to establish a period of dominance over Ligue 1 by winning a further six consecutive league titles.

At the end of the season, Jacques Santini left to manage the France national team. Former Rennes manager Paul Le Guen was appointed as his replacement.

== First-team squad ==
Squad at end of season

Note: Flags indicate national team as defined under FIFA eligibility rules; some limited exceptions apply. Players may hold more than one non-FIFA nationality.

No.	Pos.	Nation	Player
1	GK	FRA	Grégory Coupet
2	DF	BEL	Éric Deflandre
3	DF	BRA	Edmílson
4	DF	FRA	Florent Laville
6	MF	FRA	Philippe Violeau
8	MF	FRA	Pierre Laigle
9	FW	BRA	Sonny Anderson (captain)
10	MF	FRA	Eric Carrière
12	MF	BRA	Juninho Pernambucano
13	DF	FRA	Jérémie Brechet
14	FW	FRA	Sidney Govou

No.	Pos.	Nation	Player
15	DF	BEL	Christophe Delmotte
17	MF	CMR	Marc-Vivien Foé
18	FW	FRA	Péguy Luyindula
19	DF	FRA	Jean-Marc Chanelet
20	DF	SUI	Patrick Müller
21	FW	FRA	Frédéric Née
22	MF	FRA	David Linarès
29	MF	FRA	Florent Balmont
31	DF	BRA	Caçapa
33	MF	FRA	Bryan Bergougnoux

=== Left club during season ===
Note: Flags indicate national team as defined under FIFA eligibility rules; some limited exceptions apply. Players may hold more than one non-FIFA nationality.

No.	Pos.	Nation	Player
5	MF	POL	Jacek Bąk (to Lens)
7	FW	FRA	Steve Marlet (to Fulham)
11	FW	FRA	Tony Vairelles (on loan to Bastia)
23	MF	FRA	Vikash Dhorasoo (on loan to Bordeaux)

== Competitions ==
=== Overview ===
Competition	First match	Last match	Starting round	Final position	Record							
Competition	First match	Last match	Starting round	Final position	Pld	W	D	L	GF	GA	GD	Win %
Division 1	28 July 2001	4 May 2002	Matchday 1	Winners	34	20	6	8	62	32	+30	58.82
Coupe de France	15 December 2001	19 January 2002	Round of 64	Round of 32	2	1	0	1	6	2	+4	50.00
Coupe de la Ligue	1 December 2001	8 January 2002	Round of 32	Round of 16	2	0	2	0	2	2	+0	0.00
UEFA Champions League	18 September 2001	31 October 2001	Group stage	Group stage	6	3	0	3	10	9	+1	50.00
UEFA Cup	22 November 2001	28 February 2002	Third round	Fourth round	4	1	1	2	6	9	−3	25.00
Total					48	25	9	14	86	54	+32	52.08

Source: Competitions

=== Division 1 ===
==== League table ====
Pos	Team	Pld	W	D	L	GF	GA	GD	Pts	Qualification or relegation
1	Lyon (C)	34	20	6	8	62	32	+30	66	Qualification to Champions League first group stage
2	Lens	34	18	10	6	55	30	+25	64	Qualification to Champions League first group stage
3	Auxerre	34	16	11	7	48	38	+10	59	Qualification to Champions League third qualifying round
4	Paris Saint-Germain	34	15	13	6	43	24	+19	58	Qualification to UEFA Cup first round
5	Lille	34	15	11	8	39	32	+7	56	Qualification to Intertoto Cup third round

Source: Ligue 1
Rules for classification: 1) points; 2) goal difference; 3) number of goals scored.
(C) Champions

==== Results summary ====
Overall								Home						Away					
Pld	W	D	L	GF	GA	GD	Pts	W	D	L	GF	GA	GD	W	D	L	GF	GA	GD
34	20	6	8	62	32	+30	66	14	3	0	42	7	+35	6	3	8	20	25	−5

Source: Soccerway

==== Results by match ====
Match	1	2	3	4	5	6	7	8	9	10	11	12	13	14	15	16	17	18	19	20	21	22	23	24	25	26	27	28	29	30	31	32	33	34
Ground	A	H	A	H	A	A	H	A	H	A	H	A	H	A	H	A	H	A	H	A	H	H	A	H	A	H	A	H	A	H	A	H	A	H
Result	L	W	W	W	W	D	W	L	W	D	D	L	W	W	W	L	W	L	D	W	W	W	L	W	D	W	L	W	L	W	W	D	W	W
Position	16	7	4	3	2	3	3	4	1	3	3	4	3	2	2	2	2	2	2	2	2	2	2	2	2	2	2	2	2	2	2	2	2	1

A = Away; H = Home; W = Win; D = Draw; L = Loss
Notes: Match 19 versus Bastia was postponed until 16 January 2002 and therefore should appear between matches 20 & 22, and the match 21 versus Troyes was postponed until 9 February 2002 and therefore should appear between matches 25 & 26.

==== Matches ====
28 July 2001 1	Lens	2–0	Lyon	Lens
20:00 CEST	Sarr 11'; Ismaël 18'			Stadium: Stade Félix-Bollaert; Attendance: 34,239; Referee: Alain Sars

4 August 2001 2	Lyon	2–0	Sedan	Lyon
20:00 CEST	Anderson 27'; Laigle 76'			Stadium: Stade de Gerland; Attendance: 34,926; Referee: Stéphane Moulin

12 August 2001 3	Bastia	1–2	Lyon	Furiani
20:45 CEST	Ferreira 71' (pen.)		Bąk 35'; Juninho 65'	Stadium: Stade Armand Cesari; Attendance: 8,512; Referee: Gilles Veissière

18 August 2001 4	Lyon	3–0	Guingamp	Lyon
20:00 CEST	Anderson 10' (pen.); Née 85'; Foé 90+2'			Stadium: Stade de Gerland; Attendance: 35,807; Referee: Bruno Coué

25 August 2001 5	Troyes	0–2	Lyon	Troyes
20:00 CEST			Marlet 45'; Delmotte 90+3'	Stadium: Stade de l'Aube; Attendance: 14,631; Referee: Améziane Khendek

8 September 2001 6	Marseille	0–0	Lyon	Marseille
17:15 CEST				Stadium: Stade Vélodrome; Attendance: 52,559; Referee: Alain Sars

15 September 2001 7	Lyon	4–1	Nantes	Lyon
17:15 CEST	Luyindula 16', 90+1'; Foé 36'; Carrière 65'		Quint 42' (pen.)	Stadium: Stade de Gerland; Attendance: 34,406; Referee: Claude Colombo

22 September 2001 8	Metz	2–0	Lyon	Metz
20:00 CEST	Gaillot 38', 70'			Stadium: Stade Saint-Symphorien; Attendance: 16,894; Referee: Gilles Veissière

29 September 2001 9	Lyon	4–0	Rennes	Lyon
20:00 CEST	Luyindula 2'; Juninho 17', 43' (pen.); Govou 56'			Stadium: Stade de Gerland; Attendance: 30,881; Referee: Hervé Piccirillo

14 October 2001 10	Paris Saint-Germain	2–2	Lyon	Paris
20:45 CEST	Okocha 18'; Ronaldinho 81' (pen.)		Née 14'; Govou 27'	Stadium: Parc des Princes; Attendance: 41,945; Referee: Stéphane Bré

20 October 2001 11	Lyon	1–1	Sochaux	Lyon
17:15 CEST	Juninho 83'		Isabey 38'	Stadium: Stade de Gerland; Attendance: 35,705; Referee: Patrick Lhermite

27 October 2001 12	Monaco	2–1	Lyon	Monaco
20:00 CEST	Bierhoff 67'; Nonda 69'		Givet 71' (o.g.)	Stadium: Stade Louis II; Attendance: 11,706; Referee: Pascal Garibian

4 November 2001 13	Lyon	4–2	Lille	Lyon
20:45 CET	Govou 29', 76'; Pichot 48' (o.g.); Violeau 90+2'		Bréchet 30' (o.g.); Fahmi 41'	Stadium: Stade de Gerland; Attendance: 34,788; Referee: Bertrand Layec

17 November 2001 14	Lorient	0–3	Lyon	Lorient
20:00 CET			Carrière 9'; Anderson 30'; Govou 31'	Stadium: Stade du Moustoir; Attendance: 12,765; Referee: Hervé Piccirillo

25 November 2001 15	Lyon	3–0	Auxerre	Lyon
18:00 CET	Chanelet 14'; Luyindula 44'; Violeau 82'			Stadium: Stade de Gerland; Attendance: 39,165; Referee: Bruno Coué

28 November 2001 16	Montpellier	3–0	Lyon	Montpellier
18:00 CET	Cissé 1'; Maoulida 46'; Bamogo 69'			Stadium: Stade de la Mosson; Attendance: 15,147; Referee: Philippe Kalt

9 December 2001 17	Lyon	1–0	Bordeaux	Lyon
20:45 CET	Bonnissel 90' (o.g.)			Stadium: Stade de Gerland; Attendance: 31,010; Referee: Gilles Veissière

19 December 2001 18	Sedan	2–1	Lyon	Sedan
20:30 CET	Deflandre 9' (o.g.); Ndiefi 61'		Violeau 12'	Stadium: Stade Louis Dugauguez; Attendance: 15,468; Referee: Laurent Duhamel

5 January 2002 20	Guingamp	2–4	Lyon	Guingamp
20:00 CET	Bardon 6'; Fiorèse 57'		Delmotte 47', 49', 87'; Anderson 55'	Stadium: Stade du Roudourou; Attendance: 8,890; Referee: Damien Ledentu

16 January 2002 19	Lyon	0–0	Bastia	Lyon
20:30 CET				Stadium: Stade de Gerland; Attendance: 29,506; Referee: Massimo Busacca

23 January 2002 22	Lyon	4–0	Marseille	Lyon
20:30 CET	Anderson 22' (pen.), 35'; Jurietti 29' (o.g.); Govou 32'			Stadium: Stade de Gerland; Attendance: 38,378; Referee: Laurent Duhamel

29 January 2002 23	Nantes	3–0	Lyon	Nantes
20:45 CET	Vahirua 29', 45'; Moldovan 53'			Stadium: Stade de la Beaujoire; Attendance: 31,966; Referee: Alain Hamer

2 February 2002 24	Lyon	4–1	Metz	Lyon
20:00 CET	Carrière 12'; Govou 60'; Anderson 85'; Luyindula 90'		Baticle 8'	Stadium: Stade de Gerland; Attendance: 30,336; Referee: Améziane Khendek

6 February 2002 25	Rennes	2–2	Lyon	Rennes
18:00 CET	Arribagé 24'; Batlles 30' (pen.)		Anderson 18', 90+'	Stadium: Stade de la Route de Lorient; Attendance: 14,900; Referee: Hervé Piccirillo

9 February 2002 21	Lyon	3–1	Troyes	Lyon
18:00 CET	Tourenne 30' (o.g.); Anderson 47'; Delmotte 74'		Goussé 21'	Stadium: Stade de Gerland; Attendance: 31,968; Referee: Stéphane Moulin

17 February 2002 26	Lyon	3–0	Paris Saint-Germain	Lyon
20:45 CET	Déhu 61' (o.g.); Anderson 76'; Juninho 86'			Stadium: Stade de Gerland; Attendance: 38,323; Referee: Damien Ledentu

24 February 2002 27	Sochaux	2–1	Lyon	Montbéliard
18:30 CET	Govou 41' (o.g.); Frau 71'		Govou 50'	Stadium: Stade Auguste Bonal; Attendance: 17,878; Referee: Pascal Garibian

6 March 2002 28	Lyon	1–0	Monaco	Lyon
20:30 CET	Anderson 53'			Stadium: Stade de Gerland; Attendance: 32,105; Referee: Alain Sars

13 March 2002 29	Lille	2–0	Lyon	Lille
20:00 CET	Cheyrou 2'; Brunel 75'			Stadium: Stade Grimonprez-Jooris; Attendance: 19,839; Referee: Stéphane Bré

23 March 2002 30	Lyon	2–0	Lorient	Lyon
20:00 CET	Anderson 78'; Luyindula 90'			Stadium: Stade de Gerland; Attendance: 36,221; Referee: Pascal Viléo

7 April 2002 31	Auxerre	0–1	Lyon	Auxerre
20:00 CEST			Govou 90+2'	Stadium: Stade Abbé-Deschamps; Attendance: 17,458; Referee: Gilles Veissière

13 April 2002 32	Lyon	0–0	Montpellier	Lyon
20:00 CEST				Stadium: Stade de Gerland; Attendance: 39,215; Referee: Bruno Coué

27 April 2002 33	Bordeaux	0–1	Lyon	Bordeaux
20:00 CEST			Anderson 69'	Stadium: Stade Chaban-Delmas; Attendance: 32,641; Referee: Laurent Duhamel

4 May 2002 34	Lyon	3–1	Lens	Lyon
20:00 CEST	Govou 8'; Violeau 14'; Laigle 52'		Bąk 26'	Stadium: Stade de Gerland; Attendance: 39,691; Referee: Bruno Coué

=== Coupe de France ===
15 December 2001 Round of 64	Saint-Malo	0–6	Lyon	Saint-Malo
20:00 CET			Violeau 11'; Luyindula 13', 69'; Anderson 16'; Née 61', 88'	Stadium: Stade Marville; Attendance: 5,259; Referee: Bruno Ruffray

19 January 2002 Round of 32	Lyon	0–2	Châteauroux	Lyon
20:00 CET			Compan 4'; Eggimann 26' (pen.)	Stadium: Stade de Gerland; Attendance: 4,000; Referee: Bruno Derrien

=== Coupe de la Ligue ===
1 December 2001 Round of 32	Lyon	1–1 (a.e.t.) (4–3 p)	Sochaux	Lyon
20:00 CET	Müller 69'		Pedretti 51'	Stadium: Stade de Gerland; Attendance: 22,270; Referee: Claude Colombo

8 January 2002 Round of 16	Bordeaux	1–1 (a.e.t.) (4–2 p)	Lyon	Bordeaux
20:00 CET	Bréchet 45' (o.g.)		Luyindula 80'	Stadium: Stade Chaban-Delmas; Attendance: 12,145; Referee: Stéphane Bré

=== Champions League ===
==== Group stage ====
Pos	Team	Pld	W	D	L	GF	GA	GD	Pts	Qualification
1	(Spain) Barcelona	6	5	0	1	12	5	+7	15	Advance to second group stage
2	(Germany) Bayer Leverkusen	6	4	0	2	10	9	+1	12	Advance to second group stage
3	(France) Lyon	6	3	0	3	10	9	+1	9	Transfer to UEFA Cup
4	(Turkey) Fenerbahçe	6	0	0	6	3	12	−9	0	

Source: RSSSF

18 September 2001 1	Lyon (France)	0–1	(Germany) Bayer Leverkusen	Lyon, France
20:45 CEST		Report	Kirsten 75'	Stadium: Stade de Gerland; Attendance: 37,500; Referee: Graziano Cesari (Italy)

25 September 2001 2	Fenerbahçe (Turkey)	0–1	(France) Lyon	Istanbul, Turkey
20:45 CEST		Report	Delmotte 89'	Stadium: Şükrü Saracoğlu Stadium; Attendance: 10,150; Referee: Frank De Bleeckere (Belgium)

10 October 2001 3	Barcelona (Spain)	2–0	(France) Lyon	Barcelona, Spain
20:45 CEST	Kluivert 78'; Rivaldo 87' (pen.)	Report		Stadium: Camp Nou; Attendance: 60,757; Referee: Kim Milton Nielsen (Denmark)

17 October 2001 4	Lyon (France)	3–1	(Turkey) Fenerbahçe	Lyon, France
20:45 CEST	Govou 45+1'; Carrière 53'; Delmotte 68'	Report	Derelioğlu 35'	Stadium: Stade de Gerland; Attendance: 37,773; Referee: Konrad Plautz (Austria)

23 October 2001 5	Lyon (France)	2–3	(Spain) Barcelona	Lyon, France
20:45 CEST	Luyindula 66'; Carrière 88'	Report	Kluivert 9'; Rivaldo 18'; G. López 90+4'	Stadium: Stade de Gerland; Attendance: 37,800; Referee: Graham Poll (England)

31 October 2001 6	Bayer Leverkusen (Germany)	2–4	(France) Lyon	Leverkusen, Germany
20:45 CET	Sebescen 45+2'; Berbatov 52'	Report	Carrière 32', 38'; Née 64'; Govou 81'	Stadium: BayArena; Attendance: 22,500; Referee: Valentin Ivanov (Russia)

=== UEFA Cup ===
==== Third round ====
22 November 2001 First leg	Club Brugge (Belgium)	4–1	(France) Lyon	Bruges, Belgium
19:30 CET	Englebert 4'; Van Der Heyden 54'; Mendoza 75'; De Brul 90'	Report	Luyindula 83'	Stadium: Jan Breydelstadion; Attendance: 14,670; Referee: Arturo Daudén Ibáñez (Spain)

6 December 2001 Second leg	Lyon (France)	3–0 (4a–4 agg.)	(Belgium) Club Brugge	Lyon, France
19:30 CET	Anderson 19', 23', 90+3'	Report		Stadium: Stade de Gerland; Attendance: 31,086; Referee: Rune Pedersen (Norway)

==== Fourth round ====
21 February 2002 First leg	Lyon (France)	1–1	(Czech Republic) Slovan Liberec	Lyon, France
19:15 CET	Govou 81'	Report	Štajner 14' (pen.)	Stadium: Stade de Gerland; Attendance: 26,069; Referee: Frank De Bleeckere (Belgium)

28 February 2002 Second leg	Slovan Liberec (Czech Republic)	4–1 (5–2 agg.)	(France) Lyon	Prague, Czech Republic
17:00 CET	Nezmar 1', 82'; Štajner 75'; Neumann 85'	Report	Müller 17'	Stadium: Letná Stadium; Attendance: 9,506; Referee: Lucílio Batista (Portugal)
