= 2001 Coupe de la Ligue final =

Association football match

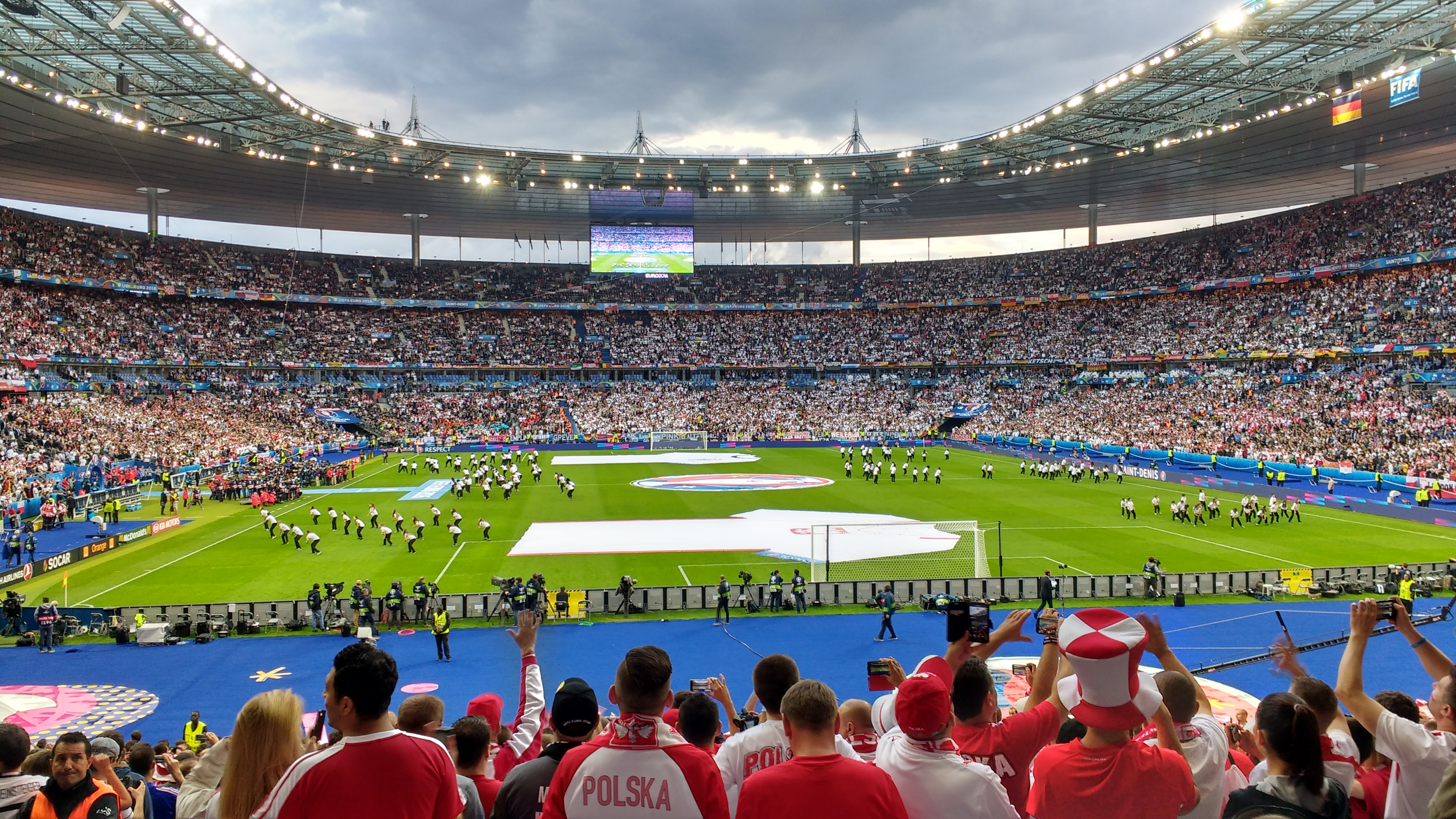
- Event: 2000–01 Coupe de la Ligue
Lyon	Monaco
Division 1	Division 1
2	1
- After extra time
- Date: 5 May 2001
- Venue: Stade de France, Saint-Denis
- Referee: Stéphane Bré
- Attendance: 78,010

The 2001 Coupe de la Ligue final was a football match held at Stade de France, Saint-Denis, on 5 May 2001, that saw Lyon defeat Monaco 2–1 thanks to goals by Caçapa and Patrick Müller.

== Route to the final ==
Note: In all results below, the score of the finalist is given first (H: home; A: away).

Lyon		Round	Monaco	
Opponent	Result	2000–01 Coupe de la Ligue	Opponent	Result
Sedan (A)	2–1	Second round	Gueugnon (H)	2–0
Lens (A)	3–1	Round of 16	Bastia (H)	2–1
Amiens (A)	2–0	Quarter-finals	Châteauroux (A)	1–0
Nantes (H)	3–2	Semi-finals	Niort (H)	2–0

== Match details ==
5 May 2001
20:45

Lyon	2–1 (a.e.t.)	Monaco
Caçapa 35'; Müller 118'		Nonda 64'

Stade de France, Saint-Denis
Attendance: 78,010
Referee: Stéphane Bré

GK	1	(France) Grégory Coupet
RB	17	(Cameroon) Marc-Vivien Foé	(substituted off) 106'
CB	31	(Brazil) Caçapa
CB	26	(France) Jérémie Bréchet
LB	6	(France) Philippe Violeau
DM	3	(Brazil) Edmílson
RM	19	(France) Jean-Marc Chanelet
CM	10	(France) Vikash Dhorasoo	(substituted off) 118'
LM	8	(France) Pierre Laigle
CF	7	(France) Steve Marlet	(substituted off) 77'
CF	9	(Brazil) Sonny Anderson (c)
Substitutes:
GK	30	(France) Angelo Hugues
DF	15	(France) Christophe Delmotte	(substituted on) 118'
DF	20	(Switzerland) Patrick Müller	(substituted on) 106'
MF	18	(France) Steed Malbranque
FW	14	(France) Sidney Govou	(substituted on) 77'
Manager:
(France) Jacques Santini

GK	1	(France) Stéphane Porato
RB	2	(Italy) Christian Panucci	(substituted off) 46'
CB	27	(France) Julien Rodriguez
CB	6	(France) Martin Djetou (c)
LB	17	(Belgium) Philippe Léonard	(substituted off) 78'
CM	4	(Mexico) Rafael Márquez
CM	21	(Sweden) Pontus Farnerud
RW	8	(France) Ludovic Giuly
AM	10	(Argentina) Marcelo Gallardo	(substituted off) 97'
LW	11	(Italy) Marco Simone
CF	18	(Democratic Republic of the Congo) Shabani Nonda
Substitutes:
GK	16	(France) André Biancarelli
DF	15	(France) Franck Jurietti	(substituted on) 46'
MF	7	(Portugal) Costinha	(substituted on) 78'
MF	22	(France) Nicolas Bonnal	(substituted on) 97'
FW	20	(Croatia) Dado Pršo
Manager:
(France) Claude Puel

== See also ==
- 2001 Coupe de France final
- 2000–01 Olympique Lyonnais season
