= Nicolas Puydebois =

French footballer (born 1981)

Personal information
- Date of birth: 28 February 1981 (age 45)
- Place of birth: Bron, France
- Height: 6 ft 0 in (1.83 m)
- Position: Goalkeeper

Team information
- Current team: GOAL FC (goalkeeper coach)

Youth career
- 1989–2002: Lyon

Senior career*
| Years | Team | Apps | (Gls) |
| 2002–2005 | Lyon | 11 | (0) |
| 2005–2008 | Strasbourg | 17 | (0) |
| 2008–2010 | Nîmes | 68 | (0) |
| 2020–2021 | Pays de L’Arbresle | | |
| Total | | 96 | (0) |

Managerial career
- 2019–2020: Pontcharra Saint-Loup
- 2021–: GOAL FC (goalkeeper coach)
- * Club domestic league appearances and goals

Nicolas Puydebois (born 28 February 1981) is a French former footballer who played as goalkeeper.

== Career statistics ==
Appearances and goals by club, season and competition
| Club | Season | League | | | National cup | | League cup | | Europe | | Other | | Total | |
| Club | Season | Division | Apps | Goals | Apps | Goals | Apps | Goals | Apps | Goals | Apps | Goals | Apps | Goals |
|---|---|---|---|---|---|---|---|---|---|---|---|---|---|---|
| Lyon | 2000–01 | Division 1 | 0 | 0 | 0 | 0 | 0 | 0 | 0 | 0 | — | | 0 | 0 |
| Lyon | 2001–02 | Division 1 | 0 | 0 | 0 | 0 | 0 | 0 | 0 | 0 | — | | 0 | 0 |
| Lyon | 2002–03 | Ligue 1 | 2 | 0 | 0 | 0 | 0 | 0 | 0 | 0 | 0 | 0 | 2 | 0 |
| Lyon | 2003–04 | Ligue 1 | 2 | 0 | 0 | 0 | 1 | 0 | 1 | 0 | 0 | 0 | 4 | 0 |
| Lyon | 2004–05 | Ligue 1 | 7 | 0 | 0 | 0 | 1 | 0 | 3 | 0 | 0 | 0 | 11 | 0 |
| Lyon | Total | | 11 | 0 | 0 | 0 | 2 | 0 | 4 | 0 | 0 | 0 | 17 | 0 |
| Strasbourg | 2005–06 | Ligue 1 | 15 | 0 | 1 | 0 | 1 | 0 | 5 | 0 | — | | 22 | 0 |
| Strasbourg | 2006–07 | Ligue 2 | 1 | 0 | 4 | 0 | 1 | 0 | — | | — | | 6 | 0 |
| Strasbourg | 2007–08 | Ligue 1 | 1 | 0 | 2 | 0 | 1 | 0 | — | | — | | 4 | 0 |
| Strasbourg | Total | | 17 | 0 | 7 | 0 | 3 | 0 | 5 | 0 | — | | 32 | 0 |
| Nîmes | 2008–09 | Ligue 2 | 36 | 0 | 2 | 0 | 0 | 0 | — | | — | | 38 | 0 |
| Nîmes | 2009–10 | Ligue 2 | 32 | 0 | 1 | 0 | 0 | 0 | — | | — | | 33 | 0 |
| Nîmes | Total | | 68 | 0 | 3 | 0 | 0 | 0 | — | | — | | 71 | 0 |
| Career total | | | 96 | 0 | 10 | 0 | 5 | 0 | 9 | 0 | 0 | 0 | 120 | 0 |

== Honours ==
- Trophée des Champions: 2002, 2004
- Ligue 1: 2004–05
