= Grégory Coupet =

French footballer (born 1972)

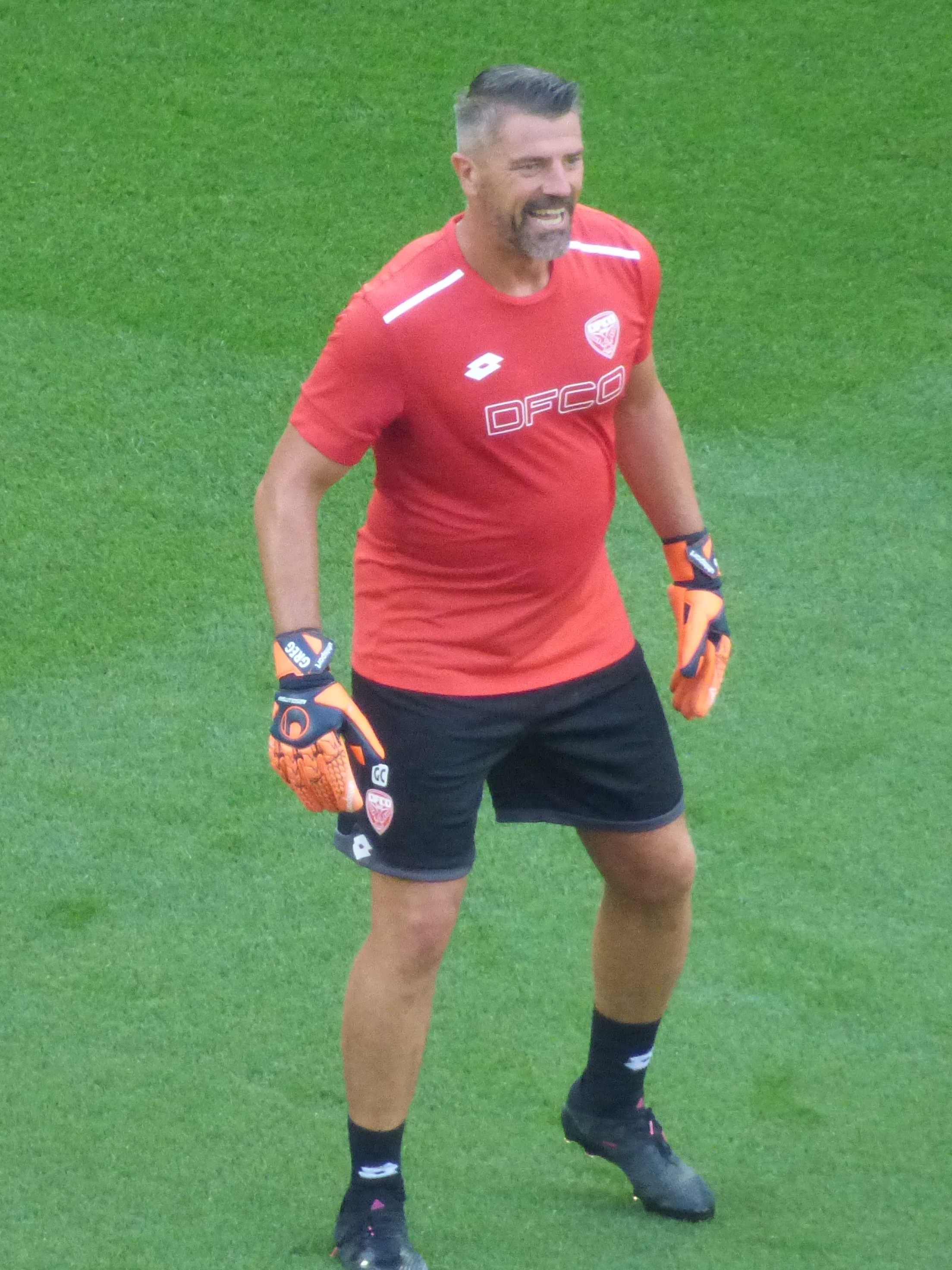
- Coupet with Dijon in 2020

Personal information
- Full name: Grégory Coupet
- Date of birth: 31 December 1972 (age 53)
- Place of birth: Le Puy-en-Velay, Haute-Loire, France
- Height: 1.81 m (5 ft 11 in)
- Position: Goalkeeper

Team information
- Current team: Bordeaux (goalkeeping coach)

Youth career
- 1977–1990: Olympique Le Puy
- 1990–1993: Saint-Étienne

Senior career*
| Years | Team | Apps | (Gls) |
| 1993–1997 | Saint-Étienne | 88 | (0) |
| 1997–2008 | Lyon | 370 | (0) |
| 2008–2009 | Atlético Madrid | 6 | (0) |
| 2009–2011 | Paris Saint-Germain | 31 | (0) |
| Total | | 495 | (0) |

International career
| 2001–2008 | France | 34 | (0) |

Managerial career
- 2016–2017: Lyon B (goalkeeping coach)
- 2018–2020: Lyon (goalkeeping coach)
- 2020–2022: Dijon (goalkeeping coach)
- 2022–: Bordeaux (goalkeeping coach)
Medal record
Men's football
Representing France
FIFA Confederations Cup
| Winner | 2001 |
| Winner | 2003 |
FIFA World Cup
| Runner-up | 2006 |
- * Club domestic league appearances and goals

Grégory Coupet (French pronunciation: [ɡʁeɡɔʁi kupɛ]; born 31 December 1972) is a French former professional footballer who played as a goalkeeper.

Coupet is most well known for his lengthy career at Lyon where he won seven Ligue 1 titles. He also played for Saint-Étienne, Atlético Madrid and Paris Saint-Germain, as well as the France national team.

== Club career ==
Coupet was born in Le Puy-en-Velay, Haute-Loire. He began his club career with hometown team Club Olympique Le Puy, before turning professional with Saint-Étienne in 1994. He made his Ligue 1 debut on 26 March 1994 in a 2–0 victory against Angers. After three seasons, he surprisingly moved to league rival Lyon (the two cities are only 80 kilometres apart, and are long-time local and national rivals) as a replacement for Pascal Olmeta in January 1997. His gamble paid off as Lyon have regularly dominated Le Championnat since 2002 and were also regular fixtures in the UEFA Champions League.

Coupet performed a memorable double save against Barcelona during a 2001–02 UEFA Champions League match, when he first acrobatically headed an unintended lob by his team-mate Caçapa onto his own crossbar, and then immediately parried a close header by the arriving Barcelona striker Rivaldo.

He openly wept during the group photo before France faced Turkey in a 2003 FIFA Confederations Cup semi-final match, which had taken place just hours after the shocking death of his close friend and former Lyon teammate Marc-Vivien Foé. Coupet credits the aftermath of Foé's death in helping him gain a new perspective on life, in the process settling his differences with Lyon after having been engaged in a contract dispute for most of the 2002–03 season, which included at one point his vowing never to play for the club again.

In 2005, Coupet was voted for the first time, at age 33, into the top 10 for the IFFHS World's Best Goalkeeper Award. He finished with 43 votes in fourth-place behind winner Petr Čech, Dida and Gianluigi Buffon respectively. He has also twice been named Ligue 1 Keeper of the Year, in 2004 and 2005.

On 2 August 2007, Coupet suffered a torn internal medial ligament in his left knee after catching his foot in the net during a training session. He underwent surgery four days later and missed the remainder of 2007, including France's final Euro 2008 qualifiers. He later joked on Lyon's official television network:

"The good side...is that [France] have a rugby World Cup coming and I’ll be able to enjoy every bit of it."

Coupet returned to the squad in the new year, making his return in Lyon's 4–0 victory over Ligue 2 side Créteil in the Coupe de France on 6 January 2008.

On 18 July 2008, Coupet was sold to Atlético Madrid for €1.5 million and an additional €250,000 bonus.

In 2009 Coupet joined Paris Saint-Germain where he finished his career before retiring in 2011. In the 2011 Coupe de France Final against Lille OSC he saved a penalty from Mathieu Debuchy, but was unable to prevent his side from losing 1–0.

== International career ==
Coupet has 34 caps with France. He made his international debut against Australia during France's 2001 FIFA Confederations Cup-winning campaign. He was called up for the 2002 World Cup as the backup to Fabien Barthez, but did not play. The following year, Coupet kept three clean sheets and conceded only three goals in five games as France won the 2003 Confederations Cup, which marked their second victory in the competition in three years. During a commemoration for the late Cameroon player Marc-Vivien Foé, Coupet broke down in tears, since they both were teammates while playing for Lyon in the French league.

In February 2006, France Football magazine conducted a poll among its readers as to who should be France's first-choice goalkeeper for the 2006 World Cup; Coupet received 69 percent of the votes (Barthez received 28 percent).

Though Coupet started six of ten games in the 2006 World Cup qualifying rounds, coach Raymond Domenech surprisingly elected Barthez as his number one, which would relegate Coupet to the bench once again. Many had expected Coupet to be chosen as the starter due to his excellent performances with Lyon that had contributed greatly to their streak of five Ligue 1 championships. This ultimately led to a row on 25 May 2006 between Coupet and Domenech that resulted in Coupet storming out of the team's training camp in Tignes with his family in tow, although he later returned and made amends with the coach.

Coupet became France's number one after Barthez announced his retirement from both club and country football in August 2006. His first regular stint – during the UEFA Euro 2008 qualifiers – however, got off to a less-than-desired start; France were upset by Scotland 1–0 on 7 October and a hand injury suffered in that match kept him out of France's 5–0 victory over the Faroe Islands four days later, being replaced by Mickaël Landreau.

He was first choice goalkeeper for the tournament proper stage of Euro 2008, conceding six goals in three matches as France were eliminated in the group stage.

During the 2010 World Cup qualifiers, Hugo Lloris and Steve Mandanda were favored by Domenech for the goalkeeping job, with Coupet called up as a reserve for a few games. Coupet was not selected to France's final World Cup squad, as Cédric Carrasso instead was chosen to join Lloris and Mandanda on the roster.

On 1 July 2010, Coupet announced his retirement from international football, saying, "I will be 39 years old when Euro 2012 commences, and I can't see myself being included in another squad for France, with Hugo Lloris and Steve Mandanda favoured over me. It happened with Fabien Barthez, he was just too good for me. When he retired, I thought I'd have 4–6 years as France's number 1, but of course it isn't to be as it seems. I therefore declare my retirement from international football, and will not be included in any more France squads. I will not reconsider my retirement now, as I have made up my mind."

== Coaching career ==
After retiring from professional football in 2011, he worked as a sports consultant for RMC radio as well as the CFoot and beIN Sport television channels. In July 2016, Coupet returned to Lyon as goalkeeper coach for the club's B-team. In November 2017, Lyon confirmed that Coupet would continue as goalkeeping coach of Lyon's Ligue 1 team from the New Year. On 20 May 2020, Lyon confirmed that Coupet would leave the club at the end of the season, as his contract was expiring. It was further confirmed that Coupet would continue his career at Dijon FCO, also as goalkeeping coach.

On 17 January 2022, Coupet left Dijon and instead joined FC Girondins de Bordeaux, also as a goalkeeping coach.

== Career statistics ==
=== Club ===
Appearances and goals by club, season and competition
| Club | Season | League | | | National cup (Note: Includes Coupe de France, Copa del Rey) | | League cup (Note: Includes Coupe de la Ligue) | | Europe | | Other | | Total | |
| Club | Season | Division | Apps | Goals | Apps | Goals | Apps | Goals | Apps | Goals | Apps | Goals | Apps | Goals |
|---|---|---|---|---|---|---|---|---|---|---|---|---|---|---|
| Saint-Étienne | 1993–94 | Division 1 | 4 | 0 | 0 | 0 | 0 | 0 | — | | — | | 4 | 0 |
| Saint-Étienne | 1994–95 | Division 1 | 26 | 0 | 2 | 0 | 1 | 0 | — | | — | | 29 | 0 |
| Saint-Étienne | 1995–96 | Division 1 | 36 | 0 | 4 | 0 | 2 | 0 | — | | — | | 42 | 0 |
| Saint-Étienne | 1996–97 | Division 2 | 22 | 0 | 2 | 0 | 2 | 0 | — | | — | | 26 | 0 |
| Saint-Étienne | Total | | 88 | 0 | 8 | 0 | 5 | 0 | — | | — | | 101 | 0 |
| Lyon | 1996–97 | Division 1 | 15 | 0 | 1 | 0 | 2 | 0 | — | | — | | 18 | 0 |
| Lyon | 1997–98 | Division 1 | 31 | 0 | 6 | 0 | 1 | 0 | 11 (Note: Seven appearances in UEFA Intertoto Cup, four appearances in UEFA Cup) | 0 | — | | 49 | 0 |
| Lyon | 1998–99 | Division 1 | 34 | 0 | 2 | 0 | 1 | 0 | 8 (Note: Appearances in UEFA Cup) | 0 | — | | 45 | 0 |
| Lyon | 1999–2000 | Division 1 | 34 | 0 | 7 | 0 | 3 | 0 | 8 (Note: Two appearances in UEFA Champions League, six appearances in UEFA Cup) | 0 | — | | 52 | 0 |
| Lyon | 2000–01 | Division 1 | 32 | 0 | 9 | 0 | 5 | 0 | 14 (Note: Appearances in UEFA Champions League) | 0 | — | | 61 | 0 |
| Lyon | 2001–02 | Division 1 | 34 | 0 | 4 | 0 | 2 | 0 | 10 (Note: Six appearances in UEFA Champions League, four appearances in UEFA Cup) | 0 | — | | 50 | 0 |
| Lyon | 2002–03 | Ligue 1 | 35 | 0 | 4 | 0 | 2 | 0 | 8 (Note: Six appearances in UEFA Champions League, two appearances in UEFA Cup) | 0 | 1 (Note: Appearance in Trophée des Champions) | 0 | 50 | 0 |
| Lyon | 2003–04 | Ligue 1 | 35 | 0 | 4 | 0 | 0 | 0 | 9 | 0 | 1 | 0 | 49 | 0 |
| Lyon | 2004–05 | Ligue 1 | 31 | 0 | 4 | 0 | 0 | 0 | 8 | 0 | 1 | 0 | 44 | 0 |
| Lyon | 2005–06 | Ligue 1 | 37 | 0 | 5 | 0 | 0 | 0 | 9 | 0 | 1 | 0 | 52 | 0 |
| Lyon | 2006–07 | Ligue 1 | 33 | 0 | 1 | 0 | 0 | 0 | 7 | 0 | 0 | 0 | 41 | 0 |
| Lyon | 2007–08 | Ligue 1 | 19 | 0 | 8 | 0 | 1 | 0 | 2 | 0 | 1 | 0 | 31 | 0 |
| Lyon | Total | | 370 | 0 | 55 | 0 | 17 | 0 | 94 | 0 | 5 | 0 | 541 | 0 |
| Atlético Madrid | 2008–09 | La Liga | 6 | 0 | 3 | 0 | — | | 2 | 0 | — | | 11 | 0 |
| Paris Saint-Germain | 2009–10 | Ligue 1 | 16 | 0 | 1 | 0 | 1 | 0 | — | | — | | 18 | 0 |
| Paris Saint-Germain | 2010–11 | Ligue 1 | 15 | 0 | 8 | 0 | 3 | 0 | 1 (Note: Appearance in UEFA Europa League) | 0 | 1 | 0 | 27 | 0 |
| Paris Saint-Germain | Total | | 31 | 0 | 9 | 0 | 4 | 0 | 1 | 0 | 1 | 0 | 46 | 0 |
| Career total | | | 495 | 0 | 75 | 0 | 26 | 0 | 97 | 0 | 6 | 0 | 699 | 0 |

=== International ===
Appearances and goals by national team and year
| National team | Year | Apps | Goals |
|---|---|---|---|
| France | 2001 | 1 | 0 |
| France | 2002 | 2 | 0 |
| France | 2003 | 3 | 0 |
| France | 2004 | 4 | 0 |
| France | 2005 | 8 | 0 |
| France | 2006 | 5 | 0 |
| France | 2007 | 4 | 0 |
| France | 2008 | 7 | 0 |
| Total | | 34 | 0 |

== Honours ==
Lyon

- Division/Ligue 1: 2001–02, 2002–03, 2003–04, 2004–05, 2005–06, 2006–07, 2007–08
- Coupe de France: 2007–08
- Coupe de la Ligue: 2000–01
- Trophée des Champions: 2002, 2003, 2004, 2005, 2007
- UEFA Intertoto Cup: 1997

Paris Saint-Germain

- Coupe de France: 2009–10

France

- FIFA Confederations Cup: 2001, 2003
- FIFA World Cup runner-up: 2006

Individual

- Toulon Tournament Best Goalkeeper: 1994
- Ligue 1 Goalkeeper of the Year: 2002–03, 2003–04, 2004–05, 2005–06
- Ligue 1 Team of the Year: 2002–03, 2003–04, 2004–05, 2005–06
- ESM Team of the Year: 2006–07
