= Choc des Olympiques =

Club football rivalry in France

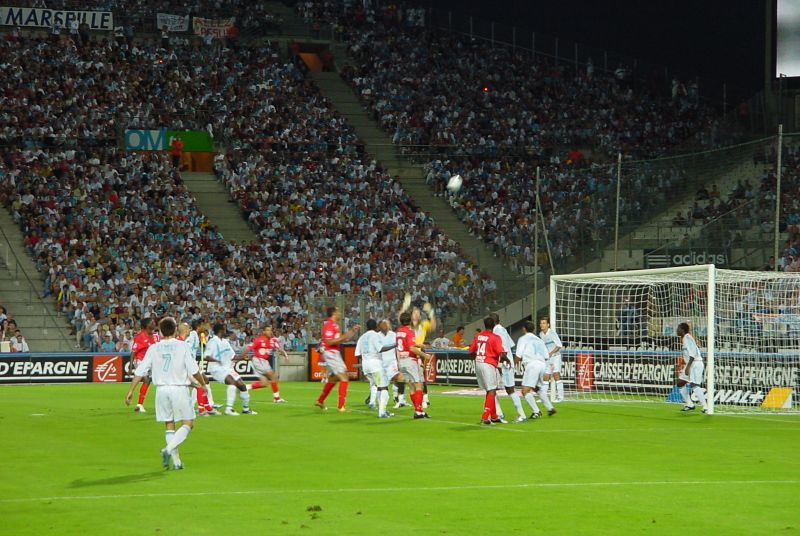
- Choc des Olympiques match in 2005
- Other names: Olympico
- Location: Lyon; Marseille
- Teams: Olympique Lyonnais; Olympique de Marseille
- First meeting: 23 September 1945; French Division 1 Marseille 1–1 Lyon
- Latest meeting: 1 March 2026; Ligue 1 Marseille 3–2 Lyon
- Next meeting: TBD
- Stadiums: Parc Olympique Lyonnais (Lyon); Stade Vélodrome (Marseille)

Statistics
- Total meetings: 127
- Most wins: Lyon (44)
- Top scorer: Bernard Lacombe (12)
- Largest victory: Lyon 8–0 Marseille; French Division 1 (24 May 1997)

The Choc des Olympiques (Clash of the Olympics), also known as the Derby des Olympiques (Derby of the Olympics), is the name of the football rivalry between two major teams in French football with "Olympique" in their names, Olympique Lyonnais and Olympique de Marseille. The French major football broadcaster Canal+ has referred to the match as the "Olympico", in reference to El Clásico, a name that has gained in popularity among fans and the media. It specifically refers to individual matches between the teams. Unlike Le Classique, the rivalry has no bad blood within it and instead stems from the competitiveness of each club's players, managers, supporters, and presidential hierarchy.

The rivalry is often cited as particularly important because both clubs are of high standard in French football and the championship is regularly decided between the two. Marseille and Lyon (along with Saint-Étienne and Paris Saint-Germain) are the only French clubs to have won the French first division four straight times, with Marseille doing it on two occasions. The Rivalry is also comparable with that of between Borussia Mönchengladbach and Borussia Dortmund better known as "Borussen Derby" in Germany.

== History ==
The first meeting between the two sides was played on 23 September 1945 and ended in a 1–1 draw. Following Jean-Michel Aulas's acquisition of Olympique Lyonnais in 1987, the rivalry entered a more competitive environment. In 1989, Marseille began an impressive streak of five consecutive French league titles, though the fifth and final title was stripped, due to the Bernard Tapie scandal, which saw the club relegated to the second division. Marseille also won the 1993 edition of the European Cup. One notable match during the streak was a 7–0 thrashing of Lyon by Marseille during the 1990–91 season.

Following Marseille's relegation to the second division and eventual return, Lyon got revenge during the 1996–97 season hammering Marseille 8–0 at the Stade de Gerland with all of their goals coming inside 55 minutes. The win, to this day, remains Lyon's biggest league victory. Lyon eventually began to ascend the French football ladder and, at the start of the new millennium, began a streak of seven consecutive French league titles, easily surpassing Marseille's streak of four. During Lyon's national record-breaking streak, Marseille finished runner-up only once, during the 2006–07 season.

== Notable matches ==
- Marseille 7–0 Lyon (13 January 1991) – Marseille, who were in the infancy of their dynasty, controlled the entire match effectively dismantling Lyon, who were led by Raymond Domenech and were in their first season back in the first division after gaining promotion in the previous season.
- Lyon 8–0 Marseille (24 May 1997) – The final match day of the 1996–97 season. Lyon opened the match quickly, scoring in the opening minute with Alain Caveglia picking up the goal. Following Caveglia's goal, Lyon began a string of deadly attacks scoring 6 unanswered goals in a span of 27 minutes. The result was 7–0 heading into the half. The final goal was scored by Ludovic Giuly in the 54th minute, which completed his hat-trick.
- Marseille 1–4 Lyon (22 October 2006) – Having endured a period of crisis in the early 2000s, Marseille had started recovering in 2002–03 to reintegrate the top half of the table. The club had begun the 2006–07 campaign well with only one defeat in its opening 9 games, and was confident of a result against OL. With two evenly match sides on paper, few people expected the football lesson that would follow. Juninho curled in a free kick to give Lyon the lead after 20 minutes. Right at the beginning of the second half, youngster Karim Benzema, then 18 years of age, added a second. Habib Bamogo did pull one back for the locals on 70 minutes but instead of spurring them on to search for an equalizer, it only ended up infuriating the visitors and giving them more determination to humiliate OM. Juninho netted another free kick on 78 minutes under a chorus of boos and catcalls descending from the stands. Kim Källström rounded up things with a fourth goal three minutes from time. For the second time in three years, Lyon humiliated OM 4–1 at the Stade Vélodrome; they had already achieved the same scoreline in November 2003.
- Marseille 2–1 Lyon (31 January 2007) – During the Round of 16 of that season's Coupe de France, Lyon scores first, with Cris scoring at the 18th minute with a header after a free kick. Throughout the match, Marseille trails on the score without scoring, and the chances to qualify for the next round become smaller and smaller. However, 2 minutes before injury time, Mickaël Pagis manages to score and Marseille comes back in the match. Two minutes later, in the first minute of the injury time, Mamadou Niang received an airborne pass and scored another goal with a header, ultimately giving Marseille the win and the qualification. The fact of this match is Lyon is considered as specialists to score goals in the last minutes of the matches, to snatch the victory, and Marseille actually did the same thing against Lyon. Marseille will be finalists of the Coupe de France, ultimately losing the final against Sochaux (2–2, 4–5 penalty shootout).
- Lyon 1–2 Marseille (11 November 2007) – Lyon came into this game having started the season quite well and being in the top five of the league. In the meantime, OM were struggling and in spite of a change in manager in September, found themselves fighting against relegation. Playing in front of their home crowd, Lyon were heavily fancied for a win and took the lead from a 7th minute Juninho goal. Marseille soon fought back and Mamadou Niang equalized from the spot after 10 minutes. An entertaining game filled with goalmouth action ensued, with Steve Mandanda, OM goalkeeper, denying Karim Benzema on several occasions. On 43 minutes, Niang scored again to give his side the lead. OL continued to dominate proceedings in the second half yet their opponents held on to their lead and left Lyon with a valuable victory, their first in a league game at Gerland since April 2004.
- Marseille 3–1 Lyon (6 April 2008) – Five months later, Eric Gerets had turned around Marseille's fortunes spectacularly, and the side was no longer languishing at the bottom of the table but fighting for a UEFA Champions League spot. They had lost just one of their last 11 league fixtures heading into this showdown. Meanwhile, Lyon had suffered a few setbacks between January and mid-February, and seen their lead over Bordeaux reduced. Spurred on by heated support from the stands, OM attacked their rivals from the start and scored twice through Mamadou Niang and Djibril Cissé just before the half-hour mark. Lyon were outplayed and were lucky to head into half time trailing by just one goal, Lorik Cana's own goal handing the Gônes a lifeline. Early in the second half, Niang bagged another goal to dispel any doubt about the game's issue. For the first time since the 1983–84 season, when both sides were playing in the second tier in the French football league system, OM achieved a league double over their rivals, who had to endure a nervous ending to the season following this defeat.
- Lyon 0–0 Marseille (14 December 2008) – Though the match was dull and unwatchable, it was more notable due to the return of Hatem Ben Arfa to the Stade de Gerland. Ben Arfa had spent seven years at Olympique Lyonnais and was a part of four of the club's title runs before departing under questionable circumstances. Before the match, on 12 December, Ben Arfa had declared that Lyon were not a great team. As a result, he was heckled and insulted every time he touched the ball or came within inches of it. He was later substituted out in the 80th minute and was subject to a barrage of boos.
- Marseille 1–3 Lyon (17 May 2009) – The balance of power of French football was beginning to tip towards the south again, after years of Olympique Lyonnais dominance. For the first time in many years, OM were above OL before heading into a confrontation with their rivals. The club coached by Eric Gerets was top of the table and targeting their first French championship since 1992. However, Lyon were not ready to let their enemy claim the title without a fight, and were determined to dent OM's title challenge. Which is exactly what they did, inspired by Karim Benzema who bagged a brace before half-time. On 90 minutes Juninho scored a third after former Lyon player Sylvain Wiltord had pulled one back for Marseille. This fixture produced Lyon's first win over Marseille since January 2007. L'OM suffered a serious setback in their title challenge and surrendered the initiative to their competitors Bordeaux, who went on to win the league two weeks later. With 2.93 million viewers, this game has become the most watched in the history of Ligue 1.
- Lyon 5–5 Marseille (8 November 2009) – Entering the match, both clubs were coming off important matches in that season's Champions League; Lyon, a 1–1 draw with Liverpool and Marseille, a 6–1 beating of Zürich. Lyon needed a victory to regain first-place position in the league, while Marseille, who were struggling for form in domestic play needed a victory to maintain a respectable position in the table. The match opened quickly with Lyon's Miralem Pjanić scoring in the 3rd minute. The goal was cancelled out 8 minutes later following Marseille's Souleymane Diawara scoring off a header from a corner kick. Just three minutes later, Lyon re-took the lead through a left-footed blast from Sidney Govou, who scored following a miraculous run. Just before halftime, Marseille again drew the match following a strike from midfielder Benoît Cheyrou that Lyon goalkeeper Hugo Lloris had a hard time handling. Within minutes into the second half, Marseille took the lead for the first time following a cross into the box. The cross missed the head of Mamadou Niang and fell to Bakari Koné who poked it past Lloris. In the 74th minute, Marseille doubled their lead through Brandão. With ten minutes remaining, Lyon got a goal back from Lisandro López, who got through Marseille's defense and cheekily chipped the ball over Steve Mandanda. Four minutes later, Lyon were awarded a penalty by referee Stéphane Bré following a handball in the box by Gabriel Heinze. The penalty was converted by Lisandro and was thought to have salvaged a draw for Lyon heading into injury time. However, in injury time, Lyon, unbelievably, took the lead following combination play between Lisandro, Pjanić, and Michel Bastos, with Bastos ultimately getting the goal. With Lyon two minutes away from victory, their chances were ruined following a throw in that resulted in a goal for Marseille to draw the match at 5–5, which was the final result. The goal was initially given to Stéphane Mbia, but was later rescinded and credited as an own goal by Jérémy Toulalan. The match has been discussed as being one of the greatest matches in French football history and one of the best matches of the football season.
- Lyon 3–2 Marseille (8 May 2011) – The circumstances were more or less the same as two years before. Once again OL were out of the title race while Marseille were competing with another team to win the league. Both teams began the game well. Loïc Rémy thought he had given his side the lead against his hometown club, but his early strike was disallowed for a dubious offside ruling. After 25 minutes, Lisandro López took the ball on the left wing, made a run towards goal and skipped inside. Souleymane Diawara attempted to block his way and conceded a penalty, which the Argentine himself took, and scored. At 69 minutes, with OM pushing forward in search of an equalizer, Lyon scored a second goal on the break. Cesar Delgado went on a mazy run and with an inspired dummy, sent two Marseille defenders crashing onto the ground. He finished the move superbly with a left-footed shot. Just when Lyon looked like they had weathered the storm, their poor defending handed their opponent a lifeline which was grabbed by Lucho Gonzalez on 70 minutes. As was often the case during Claude Puel's spell at the helm, Lyon proved unable to defend a lead against an opponent that took the game to them. Some further shambolic defending on a corner kick allowed Loic Remy to equalize with 12 minutes to go; he was unmarked at the far post. Suddenly, Lyon, who had a two-goal advantage ten minutes earlier, were looking the more vulnerable of the two sides. In a spectacular ending to the game, both Lyon and Marseille threw caution to the wind. It was OL defender Cris who scored a dramatic winner 6 minutes from time, with a sweet volley. As in 2009, Lyon underachieved in Ligue 1 but experienced the pleasure of denting Marseille's title challenge. Lille won the league a few weeks later.
- Marseille 1–1 Lyon (20 September 2015) – One year after leaving Marseille, Mathieu Valbuena came back to the Stade Velodrome with Lyon's jersey this time. He wasn't well received at all before the kickoff, as OM fans thought his Lyon signing was a traitor move. As for the game in itself, Lyon scored first thanks to their top striker Alexandre Lacazette through a penalty kick. A few minutes later, Romain Alessandrini got sent off due to a dangerous tackle over Valbuena. Right after the beginning of the second half, the crowd crossed the limit when Valbuena was about to take a corner in the second half, they started throwing dangerous items on the pitch (such as papers or glass bottles). Because of this, the game was interrupted during over 15 minutes. Once the play resumed, Marseille equalized with a header from Karim Rekik.
- Lyon 2–1 Marseille (1 February 2022) – The match was played at a postponed date after Dimitri Payet was struck on the head with a bottle at the fixture around three months prior.
- Marseille 3–0 Lyon (6 December 2023) – The match was played at a postponed date after Lyon manager Fabio Grosso was injured during an attack of the team bus on arrival around a month prior.

== Statistics and records ==
As of 1 March 2026, there have been 113 competitive league meetings between the two teams since their first league meeting. Lyon hold the advantage in the league, having won 38 matches to Marseille's 36. The most goals in one game were scored in the closely contested 5–5 draw at the Stade de Gerland on 8 November 2009. The biggest winning margin was an 8–0 home win by Lyon on 24 May 1997. Seven years earlier, Marseille defeated Lyon 7–0.

From the 113 league matches contested, Marseille's player record for goals scored against Lyon is six and is held by Mamadou Niang, who joined Marseille in 2004 and, at one point, had scored in four straight Choc des Olympiques. Lyon's player record is held by Sonny Anderson, who also attained six goals. He is followed by Sidney Govou and Juninho, who both scored five.

=== Results ===
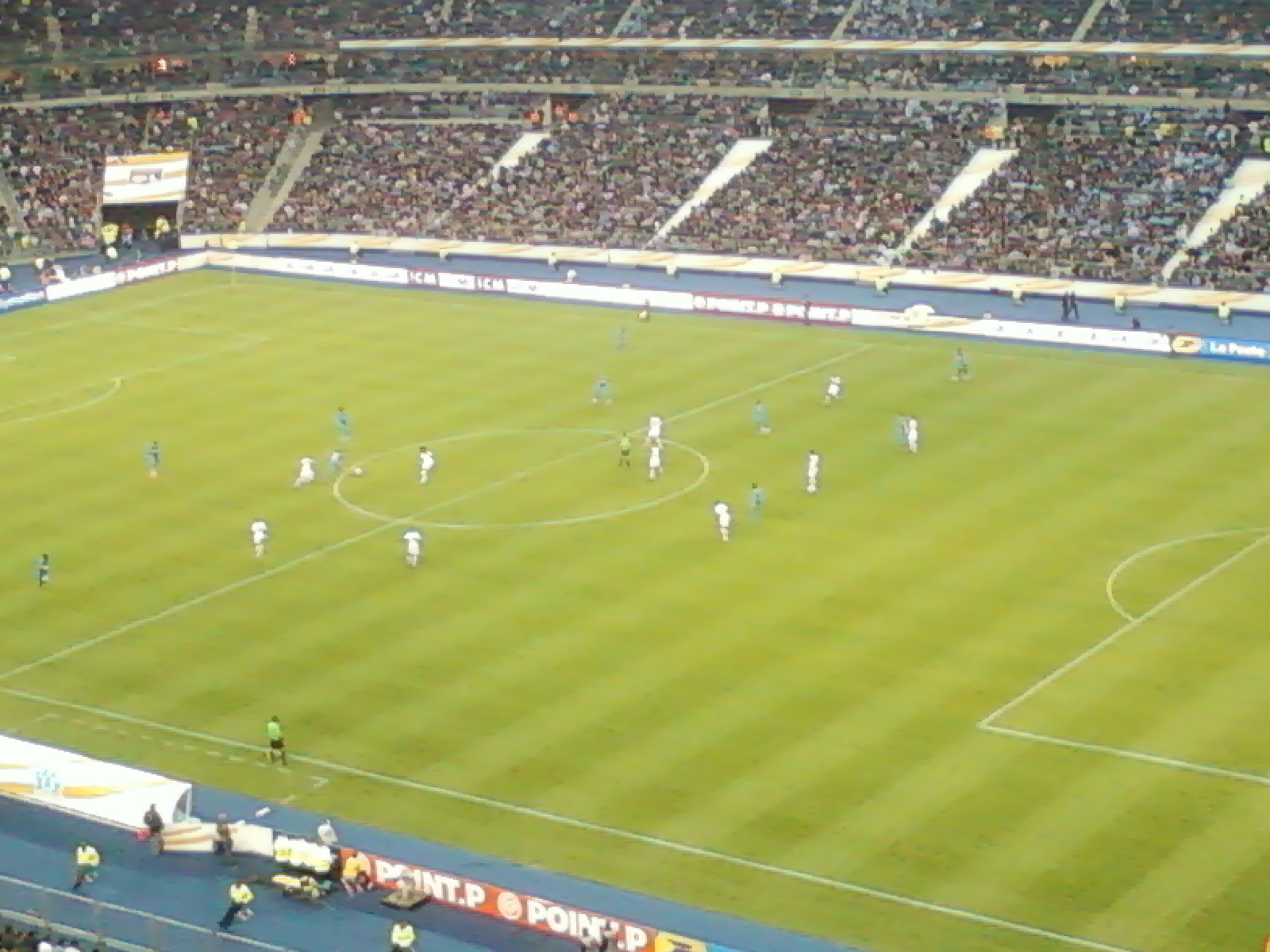
The two Olympique clubs met in the 2012 Coupe de la Ligue final, which was won by Marseille.

As of 1 March 2026

	Played	Lyon wins	Draws	Marseille wins	Lyon goals	Marseille goals
Ligue 1	111	38	39	34	176	176
Ligue 2	2	0	0	2	0	2
Coupe de France	11	4	1	6	12	13
Coupe de la Ligue	2	1	0	1	2	2
Trophée des Champions	0	0	0	0	0	0
Coupe Charles Drago	1	1	0	0	1	0
Total	127	44	40	43	191	193

== Honours ==
Both clubs' most recent trophies came in the year 2012, with Lyon winning the Trophée des Champions and Marseille winning the Coupe de France.

As of 1 January 2025

Competition	Marseille	Lyon
Ligue 1	9	7
Ligue 2	1	3
Coupe de France	10	5
Coupe de la Ligue	3	1
Trophée des Champions	3	8
UEFA Champions League	1	0
UEFA Intertoto Cup	1	1
Coupe Charles Drago	1	0
Total	29	25

== Crossing the Olympiques ==
Due to the club's ongoing rivalry, few players have played for both Lyon and Marseille. Notable players include the Ghanaian Abedi Pele, who won the African Footballer of the Year award, defender Manuel Amoros, and goalkeeper Pascal Olmeta. All three players had been part of the Marseille dynasty that won five straight French league titles and the European Cup in 1993. Amoros is the only player in the rivalry's history to transfer from one club to another, then transfer back to the previous club. Amoros had played for Marseille from 1987 to 1993, then spent two years at Lyon, before returning to Marseille in 1995. Others who played for both clubs include Sonny Anderson, who had one respectable season at Marseille and later joined Lyon becoming one of the club's most prominent players, Hatem Ben Arfa, who developed into a prodigy at Lyon before departing to Marseille under bad circumstances, and Florian Maurice, who was one of Lyon's most influential players during the mid-1990s before leaving for the south coast having two solid seasons there.

As of 31 August 2025

=== OM, then OL ===
Name	Pos	Marseille			Lyon		
Name	Pos	Career	Apps	Goals	Career	Apps	Goals
(France) Jordan Veretout	MF	2022–24	94	8	2024–25	38	2
(Croatia) Duje Ćaleta-Car	DF	2018–22	130	5	2023–	57	1
(Cameroon) Nicolas Nkoulou	DF	2011–16	207	5	2016–18	21	0
(Madagascar) Jérémy Morel	DF	2011–15	153	3	2015–19	142	1
(France) Mathieu Valbuena	MF	2006–14	331	38	2015–17	76	12
(France) Benoît Pedretti	MF	2004–05	31	3	2005–06	36	2
(France) Reynald Pedros	MF	1996–99	21	1	1997–98	15	2
(Brazil) Sonny Anderson	FW	1993–94	24	16	1999–03	154	91
(France) Pascal Olmeta	GK	1990–93	84	0	1993–96	131	0
(France) Manuel Amoros	DF	1989–93	102	2	1993–95	68	3
(Ghana) Abedi Pele	MF	1987–93	111	23	1993–94	29	3
(Algeria) Ali Bouafia	MF	1987–88	16	1	1988–92	138	26
(France) Albert Emon	FW	1968–77	137	33	1981–86	60	17

=== OL, then OM ===
Name	Pos	Lyon			Marseille		
Name	Pos	Career	Apps	Goals	Career	Apps	Goals
(Italy) Emerson Palmieri	DF	2021–22	36	1	2025–	0	0
(Algeria) Amine Gouiri	FW	2017–20	15	0	2025–	16	10
(Cameroon) Clinton Njie	FW	2012–15	43	8	2016–19	59	12
(Cameroon) Henri Bedimo	DF	2013–16	103	1	2016–18	23	0
(France) Bafétimbi Gomis	FW	2009–14	243	90	2016–17	34	21
(France) Loïc Rémy	FW	2006–08	19	0	2010–13	105	42
(France) Alou Diarra	MF	2006–07	24	3	2011–12	50	2
(France) Hatem Ben Arfa	MF	2004–08	92	12	2008–11	58	8
(France) Sylvain Wiltord	FW	2004–07	114	32	2009	15	2
(France) Péguy Luyindula	FW	2001–04	126	46	2004–05	42	10
(France) Steve Marlet	FW	2000–01	49	18	2003–05	64	17
(France) Florian Maurice	FW	1991–97	126	44	1998–01	62	23
(France) Manuel Amoros	DF	1993–95	66	3	1995–96	16	0
(France) Daniel Bravo	MF	1997–98	14	4	1998–99	21	1
(France) Eric Roy	MF	1993–96	111	9	1996–99	87	10
(France) Bruno Ngotty	DF	1988–95	237	13	2000–01	32	0
(France) François Lemasson	GK	1987–90	101	0	1998–99	5	0
(France) Jean-François Domergue	DF	1982–83	42	9	1986–88	73	6
(France) Daniel Xuereb	MF	1977–81	95	23	1981–86	19	3
(France) Jean Tigana	MF	1978–81	104	15	1989–91	76	1
