= Angelo Hugues =

French footballer (born 1966)

Personal information
- Date of birth: 3 September 1966 (age 59)
- Place of birth: Rosendaël, France
- Height: 1.82 m (6 ft 0 in)
- Position: Goalkeeper

Senior career*
Years	Team	Apps	(Gls)
1984–1986	US Dunkerque		
1986–1993	Monaco	11	(0)
1993–1998	Guingamp	154	(0)
1998–1999	Lorient	30	(0)
1999–2002	Lyon	4	(0)
2002–2003	Wisła Kraków	18	(0)
2003–2004	Bastia	0	(0)
2004–2005	Le Gallia Club Lunel		
2005	Al-Gharafa		
2006–2009	PCAC Sète		
- * Club domestic league appearances and goals

Angelo Hugues (born 3 September 1966) is a French former professional footballer who played as a goalkeeper for Monaco, Lyon and Wisła Kraków among others.

Whilst at Guingamp he won the 1996 UEFA Intertoto Cup.

== Honours ==
Monaco

- French Division 1: 1987–88

Guingamp

- UEFA Intertoto Cup: 1996

Lyon

- Coupe de la Ligue: 2000–01

Wisła Kraków

- Ekstraklasa: 2002–03
- Polish Cup: 2002–03
