= Edmílson =

Brazilian footballer (born 1976)

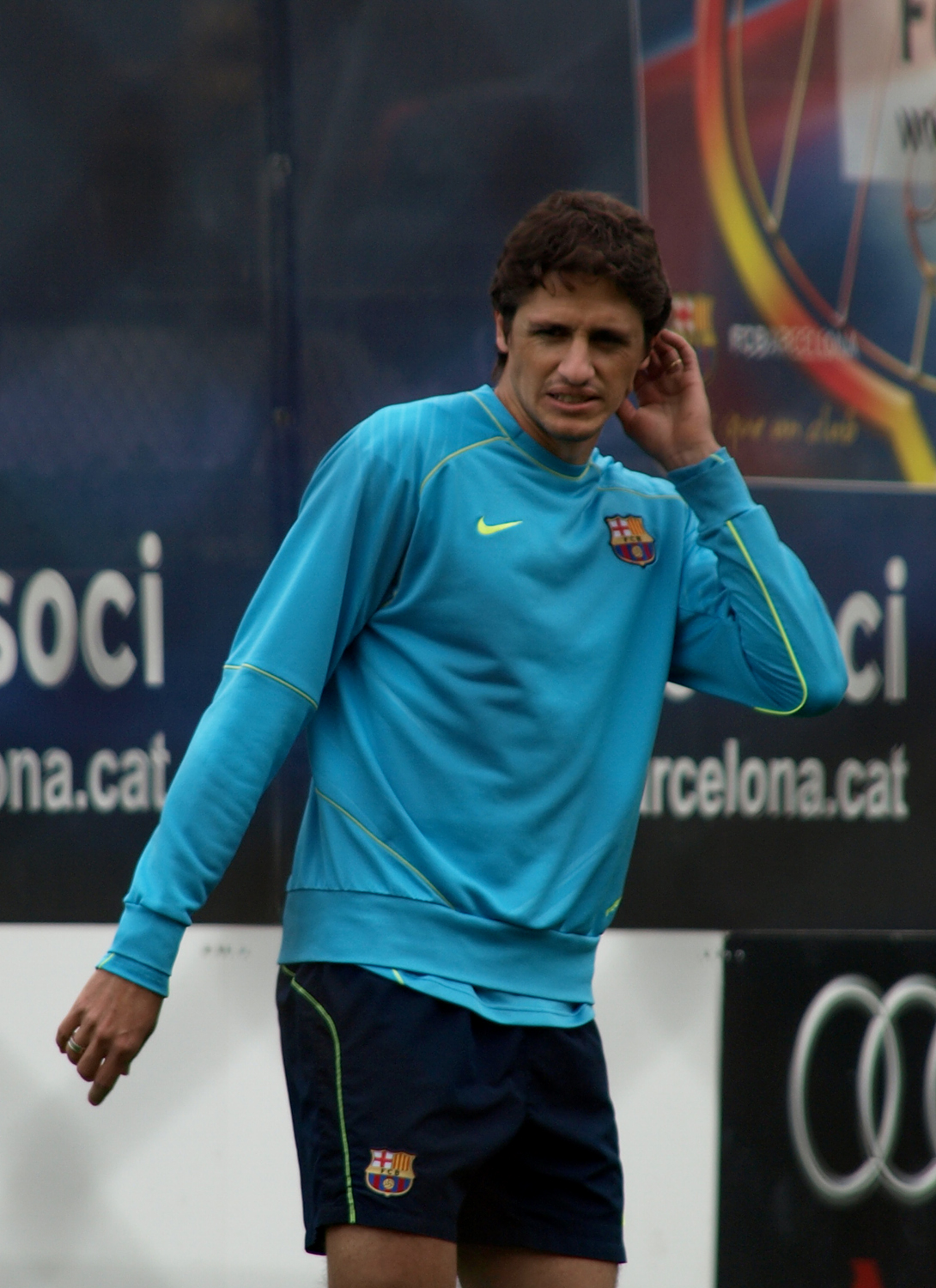
- Edmílson training with Barcelona in 2008

Personal information
- Full name: José Edmílson Gomes Moraes
- Date of birth: 10 July 1976 (age 50)
- Place of birth: Taquaritinga, Brazil
- Height: 1.86 m (6 ft 1 in)
- Positions: Defensive midfielder; centre back

Team information
- Current team: São Caetano (technical consultant)

Senior career*
Years	Team	Apps	(Gls)
1993–1994	XV de Jaú	58	(3)
1995–2000	São Paulo	72	(1)
2000–2004	Lyon	104	(3)
2004–2008	Barcelona	71	(0)
2008	Villarreal	6	(0)
2009	Palmeiras	22	(0)
2010–2011	Zaragoza	29	(1)
2011	Ceará	11	(2)
Total		373	(10)

International career
2000–2007	Brazil	39	(1)
Medal record
Men's Football
Representing Brazil
FIFA World Cup
Winner	2002 Korea/Japan
- * Club domestic league appearances and goals

José Edmílson Gomes de Moraes (born 10 July 1976), known simply as Edmílson, is a Brazilian football executive and former professional footballer. Capable of playing as either a defensive midfielder or a central defender, he played in three countries during his professional career, enjoying both team and individual success with São Paulo (1995–2000), Lyon (2000–2004) and Barcelona (2004–2008). At Barcelona, he completed a historic continental double, as the team won the La Liga title and the UEFA Champions League. Having won 39 caps with Brazil, Edmílson represented the nation at the 2002 World Cup, helping it win the tournament.

After his retirement, he became a technical consultant for São Caetano.

== Club career ==
=== São Paulo, Lyon ===
Born in Taquaritinga, São Paulo, Edmílson signed for São Paulo FC in 1995, winning two Campeonato Paulista titles during his spell. In 2000 he joined Olympique Lyonnais in France at the same time as compatriot Caçapa, also a stopper, both being important as the club won the League Cup in his first season.

In the ensuing off-season, Juninho Pernambucano also made the move to the Rhône-Alpes, and often partnered Edmílson in central midfield as they went on to win three consecutive Ligue 1 titles.

=== Barcelona ===
In July 2004, Edmílson signed with FC Barcelona for a reported €10 million. He made his La Liga debut on 19 September in a 1–1 away draw against Atlético Madrid, and finished his debut campaign with only six matches as the Catalans won the national championship; on 3 October, after having come on as a substitute for Samuel Eto'o during a home fixture against CD Numancia, he himself had to be substituted after only five minutes on the pitch, going on to be sidelined for several months due to injury.

Edmílson recovered fully for 2005–06, collecting 41 appearances across all competitions, and playing an important part in Frank Rijkaard's team as they won the league and the season's UEFA Champions League. In the latter competition, he appeared in nine matches – six complete – including the first half of the final against Arsenal.

After a poor 2007–08 campaign, both individually and collectively, and following the departure of the club's manager Rijkaard, 32-year-old Edmílson left Barcelona as his contract was not renewed.

=== Later years ===
On 23 May 2008, Edmílson signed for one year with Villarreal CF. After only a couple of months, however, he returned to his country, joining Sociedade Esportiva Palmeiras on a two-year deal and scoring his first goal in the first stage of the Copa Libertadores against Club Real Potosí, on 29 January 2009, just eight days after his arrival.

After not having appeared in the São Paulo championship in 2010, Edmílson cut ties with Palmeiras and, on 31 January, returned to Spain, agreeing to a five-month contract with struggling Real Zaragoza – at that time, he was already the bearer of an Italian passport, thus not counting as a foreign player. He appeared regularly during the remainder of the campaign, as the Aragonese managed to finish out of the relegation zone, and saw his link being extended for another year.

On 12 September 2010, Edmílson scored his first goal for Zaragoza, who lost 3–5 at home against Málaga CF. In June 2011, after having contributed with only 12 games to the club's final escape from relegation, he returned to his country and joined Ceará Sporting Club, where he remained until his retirement at the end of the year.

== International career ==
Edmílson made his debut for the Brazil national team on 18 July 2000, against Paraguay. Selected to the 2002 FIFA World Cup in Japan and South Korea, he helped the Seleção win their fifth tournament, appearing in six out of seven games and scoring his first (and only) international goal in the 5–2 group stage win over Costa Rica.

Originally selected to the 2006 World Cup in Germany, Edmílson was forced to withdraw from the squad after sustaining a knee injury in training before the tournament.

== Style of play ==
Regarded as a versatile defensive player, Edmílson played in midfield or defence during his time with Barcelona; he was deployed both in central midfield and as a right-sided central defender during his time with Lyon, and as a centre-back in a back three with Brazil during the 2002 World Cup.

== Personal life ==
Edmílson is a devout evangelical Christian, having converted when he was 16 years old.

== Career statistics ==
#	Date	Venue	Opponent	Score	Result	Competition
1.	13 June 2002	World Cup Stadium, Suwon, South Korea	Costa Rica	0–3	2–5	2002 FIFA World Cup

== Honours ==
São Paulo

- Campeonato Paulista: 1998, 2000
- Copa Master de CONMEBOL: 1996

Lyon

- Ligue 1: 2001–02, 2002–03, 2003–04
- Coupe de la Ligue: 2000–01
- Trophée des Champions: 2003

Barcelona

- La Liga: 2004–05, 2005–06
- Supercopa de España: 2005
- UEFA Champions League: 2005–06

Brazil

- FIFA World Cup: 2002

Individual

- UNFP Ligue 1 Team of the Year: 2000–01
