= Christophe Delmotte =

Belgian-born French footballer (born 1969)

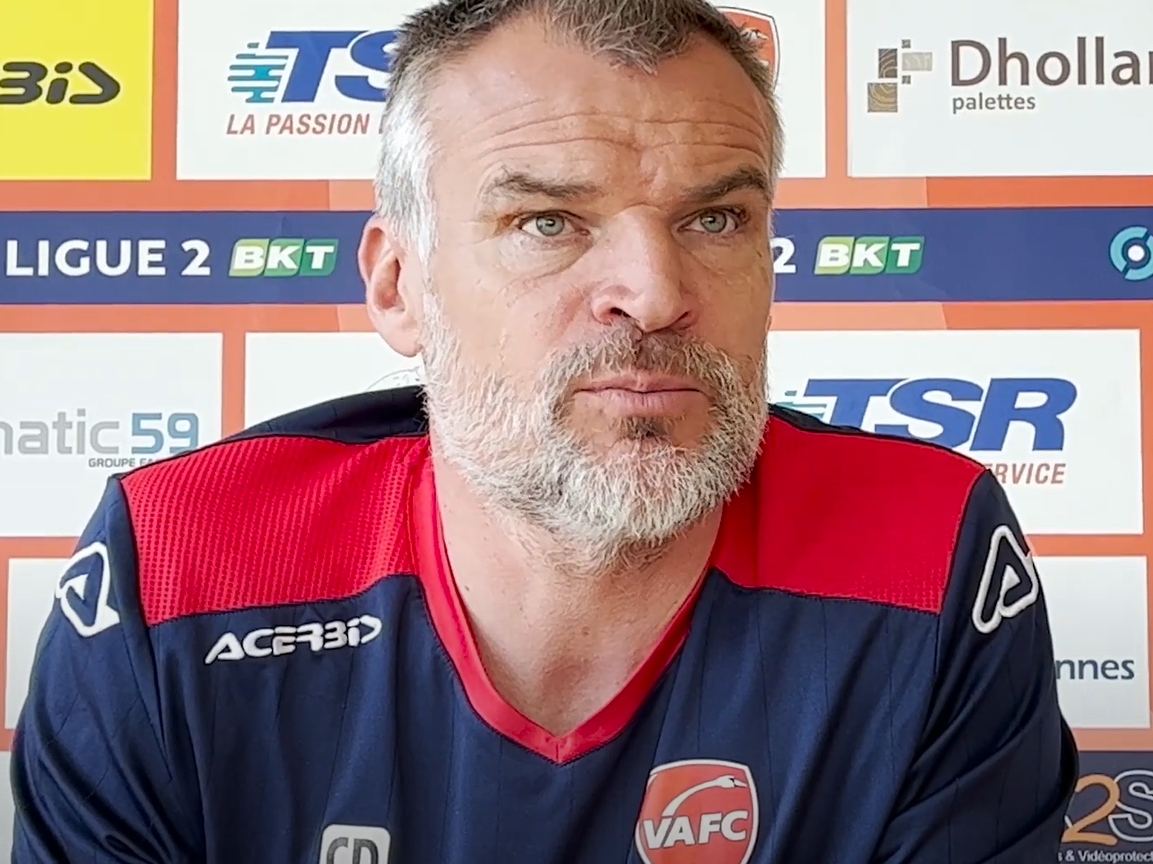
- Delmotte in 2022

Personal information
- Date of birth: 9 June 1969 (age 57)
- Place of birth: Comines-Warneton, Belgium
- Height: 1.89 m (6 ft 2 in)
- Positions: Defender; defensive midfielder

Team information
- Current team: France U21 (assistant)

Youth career
- –1990: US Tourcoing

Senior career*
Years	Team	Apps	(Gls)
1990–1991	Wasquehal		
1991–1997	Lens	105	(8)
1993–1994	→ Sedan (loan)	42	(5)
1994–1995	→ Cannes (loan)	37	(3)
1997–2004	Lyon	150	(12)
2004–2006	Reims	72	(6)
2006–2007	Saint-Priest		
Total		+406	(+34)

Managerial career
- 2008–2010: Lens (assistant)
- 2011: Lens (assistant)
- 2011–2013: Lyon U19
- 2013–2015: Le Havre (assistant)
- 2017–2021: Valenciennes B
- 2021–2022: Valenciennes
- 2022–2024: FC Metz (assistant)
- 2024: Metz B (assistant)
- 2024–2025: Metz B
- 2025–: France U21 (assistant)
- * Club domestic league appearances and goals

Christophe Delmotte (born 9 June 1969) is a Belgian-born French football manager and former player who is the assistant manager of France national under-21 team.

== Club career ==
He played in the youth teams and later the first team of US Tourcoing until 1990, competing in the French fourth division.

During the 1990–91 season, he played for Wasquehal, where he featured in a Coupe de France match against Paris Saint-Germain in the 1991 round of 32, held at Stade Arthur Buyse. On that occasion, his team was defeated 1–0 following a controversial penalty converted by Safet Sušić, after his teammate Reynald Descarpentries had earlier hit the woodwork with a turning shot (51st minute)

He made his debut for Lens in the 1991–92 season, scoring 2 goals in 14 league appearances. After two seasons with Lens, he went on to play for Sedan and later Cannes.

He then returned to Lens for two further seasons before being transferred to Lyon, where he spent seven seasons from 1997 to 2004. With the club, he won three Ligue 1 titles and competed in the UEFA Champions League. During this period, he was also nicknamed “Toph' Delmotte”.

The end of his time at Lyon was affected by recurring injuries, including an ankle fracture sustained against Nice. In the 2003–04 season, having just recovered from injury, he only played in the final league match of the season, which still allowed him to be crowned French champion before leaving the club.

He subsequently signed for Reims, then competing in Ligue 2, where he played as a defender between 2004 and 2006. He was well regarded by the club’s supporters and completed two full seasons.

In 2006, Delmotte returned to Lyon to finish his playing career with the amateur side Saint-Priest.

He was known for his mental strength (notably scoring a last-minute winner in the 90th minute of the Olympique Lyonnais–Saint-Étienne rivalry on 21 December 2000), his imposing physique (1.88 m, 88 kg), and his pace.

== Managerial career ==
He later obtained his coaching qualifications and was appointed assistant manager of Lens on 27 May 2008, working under Jean-Guy Wallemme. Two years later, he became the club’s opposition scout.

On 18 July 2011, he returned to Lyon to take charge of the club's under-19 team.

On 4 June 2013, he was appointed assistant manager to Erick Mombaerts at Le Havre

In the summer of 2014, he joined Canal+, appearing in particular on the program Les Spécialistes broadcast on Canal+ Sport.

On 5 July 2017, he was appointed manager of the reserve team of Valenciennes, competing in Régional 1 (sixth tier) On 5 November 2021, following the dismissal of Olivier Guégan, he was appointed manager of the first team

On 24 June 2022, he joined Metz as assistant manager of the first team alongside László Bölöni. At the end of the 2022–23 Ligue 2 season, the club was promoted to Ligue 1. In September 2023, the club announced the contract extension of Bölöni and his staff, including Delmotte, from June 2024 to June 2025

On 8 October 2024, he became manager of the Metz reserve team in Championnat National 3, succeeding Sylvain Marchal

Shortly after the end of his contract with Metz in July 2025, he was appointed on 5 August as assistant manager of the France national under-21 team.

== Honours ==
- UEFA Intertoto Cup: 1997
- Coupe de la Ligue: 2000-01
- Ligue 1: 2001–02, 2002–03
