= Patrick Müller (footballer) =

Swiss footballer (born 1976)

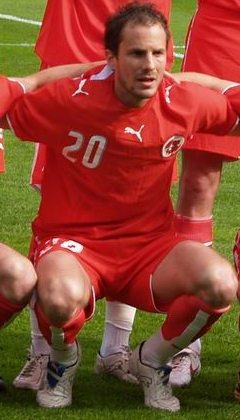
- Müller playing for Switzerland in 2006

Personal information
- Full name: Patrick Müller
- Date of birth: 17 December 1976 (age 49)
- Place of birth: Genève, Switzerland
- Height: 1.82 m (6 ft 0 in)
- Position: Defender

Youth career
- 1984–1994: FC Meyrin
- 1994–1995: Servette

Senior career*
Years	Team	Apps	(Gls)
1995–1999	Servette	104	(4)
1999	Juventus	0	(0)
1999	→ Grasshoppers (loan)	12	(0)
1999–2000	Grasshoppers	24	(1)
2000–2004	Lyon	131	(2)
2004	Mallorca	6	(0)
2005–2006	FC Basel	28	(0)
2006–2008	Lyon	23	(1)
2008–2010	Monaco	7	(0)
Total		335	(8)

International career
1998–2008	Switzerland	89	(3)
- * Club domestic league appearances and goals

Patrick Müller (born 17 December 1976) is a Swiss former professional footballer who played as a defender. In his fifteen-year professional career, Müller played for football clubs in Switzerland, France, and Spain, including two spells with Lyon.

== Club career ==
=== Meyrin, Servette ===
Born in Geneva, to German father and Swiss mother from Lausanne Müller began his children's football with local club FC Meyrin before he moved to the youth department of Servette in 1994. One year later he advanced to their first team and immediately became regular starter. In 1998 he received his first international call up. In the 1998–99 Nationalliga A season he won the Swiss championship with Servette.

=== Juventus ===
While Müller was playing in one of his first international matches, he was watched by a scout from Juventus and soon afterwards offered a contract. Müller signed for five-years and his contract would have run from January 1999, but Müller didn't want to make the move until the summer. It never came to a match or a training with Juve, but they loaned him out inside Switzerland.

=== Grasshoppers ===
Only a few weeks after signing with Juve, Müller signed a loan contract with Grasshoppers in Zürich. Immediately he was a starter in their team. The loan contract ran over one year, but in summer 1999 GC bought Müller out of this contract and signed him definitively. Then on 24 May 2000 it was announced that Müller would leave GC and join Lyon on a four-year contract. It was also reported that the transfer fee was the equivalent of 12.75 million Swiss francs, which was the highest amount ever paid for a Swiss player to that time.

=== Lyon ===
Müller's talent had been noted by the French club Lyon, who signed him in summer 2000. In his first season with Lyon they became league runners-up and the following year they won the championship. They repeated this success three consecutive times.

=== Mallorca ===
In summer 2004 Müller signed for Spanish club Real Mallorca on a free transfer. However, the deal never worked out and Müller later regarded his move as set back in his career. Because he only had six appearances, two of which as substitute, after just a few months he ended the contact with the club prematurely.

=== Basel ===
On 7 January 2005 it was announced that Müller had signed for FC Basel on a two-and-a-half-year contract. He joined Basel's first team during the winter break of their 2004–05 season under head coach Christian Gross. After playing in seven test games, Müller played his debut for the club in the home game in the St. Jakob-Park on 17 February 2005 as Basel played a goalless draw with Lille in the round of 32 in the 2004–05 UEFA Cup. He played his domestic league debut with the team just three days later on 20 February, in the away game in the Espenmoos as Basel were defeated 3–1 by St. Gallen. Basel completed all the 2004–05 Super League season's seventeen home games undefeated, winning thirteen and drawing four. They ended the season as Swiss champions with 10 points advantage over second placed Thun.

During the winter break of the following season, former club Lyon again showed interest in the defender. On 26 January 2006 the deal was completed. During his time with the club, Müller played a total of 51 games for Basel scoring one goal. 28 of these games were in the Swiss Super League, two in the Swiss Cup, seven in the UEFA Cup and 14 were friendly games. He scored his goal during the test games.

=== Lyon ===
Müller rejoined Lyon during the winter break of the 2005–06 Ligue 1 season. At the end of the season Müller again won the championship with the club. Again they repeated this success three consecutive times. The first time Müller was a regular starter, but in the other two he was only in supporting roles and did not play very often.

=== Monaco ===
On 31 August 2008, Müller moved from Lyon to AS Monaco on a free transfer and he signed a two-year contract with them. However, after a few appearances he was no longer considered for the first team. He played his last game in spring 2009. But, despite looking for a new club he was not successful and he remained with the club for the duration of the contract.

== International career ==
Müller played for the Switzerland national team on a regular basis and was called into the squad for the 2006 World Cup. He is infamous for several incidents where he blocked balls with his hands during the 2006 World Cup.

He represented the national team at 2008 UEFA Euro, where the team showed good performance in the tournament, achieving the best result at the time.

== Personal life ==
Müller has a wife named Katia and has two children, daughter Norah (born 30 April 2004) and son Dan (born 5 March 2006). He holds dual nationality, Swiss and Austrian.

== Honours ==
Lyon

- Ligue 1: 2001-02, 2002-03, 2003-04, 2005-06, 2006-07, 2007-08
- Coupe de France: 2007-08
- Coupe de la Ligue: 2000-01
- Trophée des Champions: 2002, 2003, 2006, 2007

Basel

- Swiss Super League: 2004–05

== Sources ==
- Die ersten 125 Jahre. Publisher: Josef Zindel im Friedrich Reinhardt Verlag, Basel. ISBN 978-3-7245-2305-5
- Verein "Basler Fussballarchiv" Homepage
