= Pierre Laigle =

French footballer (born 1970)

Personal information
- Date of birth: 12 September 1970 (age 56)
- Place of birth: Béthune, Pas-de-Calais, France
- Height: 1.80 m (5 ft 11 in)
- Position: Midfielder

Senior career*
Years	Team	Apps	(Gls)
1990–1996	Lens	182	(23)
1996–1999	Sampdoria	90	(9)
1999–2002	Lyon	70	(5)
2002–2004	Montpellier	40	(1)
2005–2007	Saint-Priest	38	(3)
Total		420	(41)

International career
1996–1997	France	8	(1)
- * Club domestic league appearances and goals

Pierre Laigle (born 12 September 1970) is a French former professional footballer who played as a midfielder.

== Career ==
Laigle played for a number of Ligue 1 teams throughout his career, before retiring at the end of the 2006–07 season. He also played in Italy for Sampdoria, returning to his native country after relegation in the 1998–99 Serie A.

He was in the France national team's preliminary squad of 28 players for the 1998 FIFA World Cup on home soil. However, he was one of six players dropped by head coach Aime Jacquet just before the tournament began. France went on to win the tournament.

== Honours ==
Lyon

- Coupe de la Ligue: 2000–01
- Division 1: 2001–02
