= Marc-Vivien Foé =

Cameroonian footballer (1975–2003)

- Foé playing for Cameroon in 2003

Personal information
- Full name: Marc-Vivien Foé
- Date of birth: 21 May 1975
- Place of birth: Yaoundé, Cameroon
- Date of death: 26 June 2003 (aged 28)
- Place of death: Lyon, France
- Height: 1.88 m (6 ft 2 in)
- Position: Midfielder

Youth career
- 1991–1992: Union de Garoua
- 1992–1994: Fogape Yaoundé

Senior career*
Years	Team	Apps	(Gls)
1994	Canon Yaoundé		
1994–1999	Lens	85	(11)
1999–2000	West Ham United	38	(1)
2000–2003	Lyon	43	(3)
2002–2003	→ Manchester City (loan)	35	(9)
Total		201	(24)

International career
1993	Cameroon U20	3	(1)
1993–2003	Cameroon	62	(8)
Medal record
Representing Cameroon
Africa Cup of Nations
Winner	2000 Ghana-Nigeria
Winner	2002 Mali
FIFA Confederations Cup
Runner-up	2003 France
- * Club domestic league appearances and goals

Marc-Vivien Foé (French: [maʁk vivjɛ̃ foɛ]; 21 May 1975 – 26 June 2003) was a Cameroonian professional footballer, who played as a defensive midfielder.

Having initially played for Canon Yaoundé, Foé went on to play professionally in Ligue 1 and the Premier League with Lens, West Ham United, Lyon and Manchester City. On 26 June 2003, Foé died suddenly during an international match for Cameroon, an event which shocked the football community worldwide. The death was later ruled to be due to hypertrophic cardiomyopathy. He was capped 62 times by his nation and had scored 8 goals.

He was posthumously decorated with the Commander of the National Order of Valour and had his shirt numbers 23 and 17 retired by Manchester City and Lens, respectively.

== Club career ==
Foé was born on 21 May 1975 in Yaoundé, Cameroon. He started as a junior with Elite Two side Union de Garoua. Moving to Canon Yaoundé, one of the biggest clubs in Cameroon, he won the Cameroonian Cup in 1993.

After turning down Auxerre for a trainee position, he signed for another French club, Lens of Ligue 1. His debut on 13 August 1994 was a 2–1 win against Montpellier. In five seasons at Lens, he won the 1998 French league title.

In 1998, he was targeted by Manchester United, but Lens turned down a £3 million offer for him. Further negotiations between the clubs were curtailed abruptly after he broke a leg at Cameroon's pre-World Cup training camp, and subsequently missed the whole of the 1998 World Cup.

Shortly after his recovery, he moved to English Premier League club West Ham United, for a club record fee of £4.2 million in January 1999. He played 38 league matches for West Ham, scoring one goal against Sheffield Wednesday. He also scored a goal in West Ham's 3–1 win against NK Osijek in the UEFA Cup.

In May 2000, he moved back to France, joining Lyon on a £6 million transfer. He missed much of the season after he developed symptoms of malaria. After he had recovered, he won the Coupe de la Ligue in 2001, and the Division 1 league title a year later.

Foé then returned to the English Premier League, loaned to Manchester City in the 2002–03 season for £550,000. His debut on the opening day of the season was a 3–0 loss to Leeds United. Foé was a first team regular for Kevin Keegan's team, starting 38 of 41 matches. His first goal for the club came against Sunderland at the Stadium of Light on 9 December 2002, and he scored five more goals in the next month. His second goal in a 3–0 victory against Sunderland on 21 April 2003 was the club's final goal at their old Maine Road stadium.

== International career ==
Foé began representing Cameroon at under-20s when he was called up to the squad of 18 players for the 1993 FIFA World Youth Championship in Australia, under the management of Jean Manga-Onguéné. He played in all of their three group stage matches, scoring one goal in a 3–2 defeat to Colombia in their second match on 8 March 1993, as Cameroon were eventually eliminated from the competition after finishing third. Foé later made his senior debut against Mexico on 22 September 1993 at the Memorial Coliseum, a match which Cameroon lost 1–0.

The following year, he was included in the Cameroon squad for the 1994 World Cup, starting all three of their matches. Team members had been in various financial and disciplinary disputes with the Cameroon Football Association, and the squad was a shadow of the one which had famously reached the quarter-finals of the World Cup in 1990. Cameroon mustered just one point from three matches, and finished with an embarrassing 6–1 defeat to Russia. However, Foé's consistently strong performances as a defensive midfielder (including a goal assist) prompted interest from European clubs.

He was in the Cameroon squad in the 2002 World Cup. As in 1994, he played in all of Cameroon's matches. Though the team performed better than in 1994, they were again eliminated at the group stage, having beaten Saudi Arabia, drawn with Ireland and lost to Germany. He was part of Cameroon squad to Africa Cup of Nations in 1996 and 1998, and also part of double winning squad in 2000 and 2002; and 2001 FIFA Confederations Cup.

=== Death ===
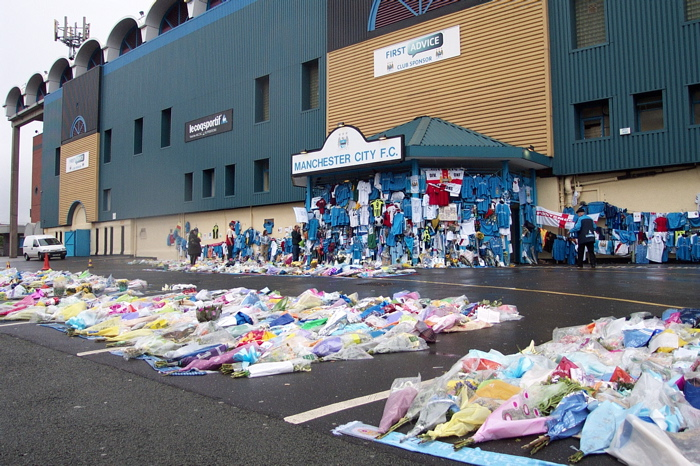
Tributes left at the front gates of Maine Road.

Foé was part of the Cameroon squad for the 2003 FIFA Confederations Cup. He played in wins against Brazil and Turkey and was rested for the match against the United States, with Cameroon having already qualified.

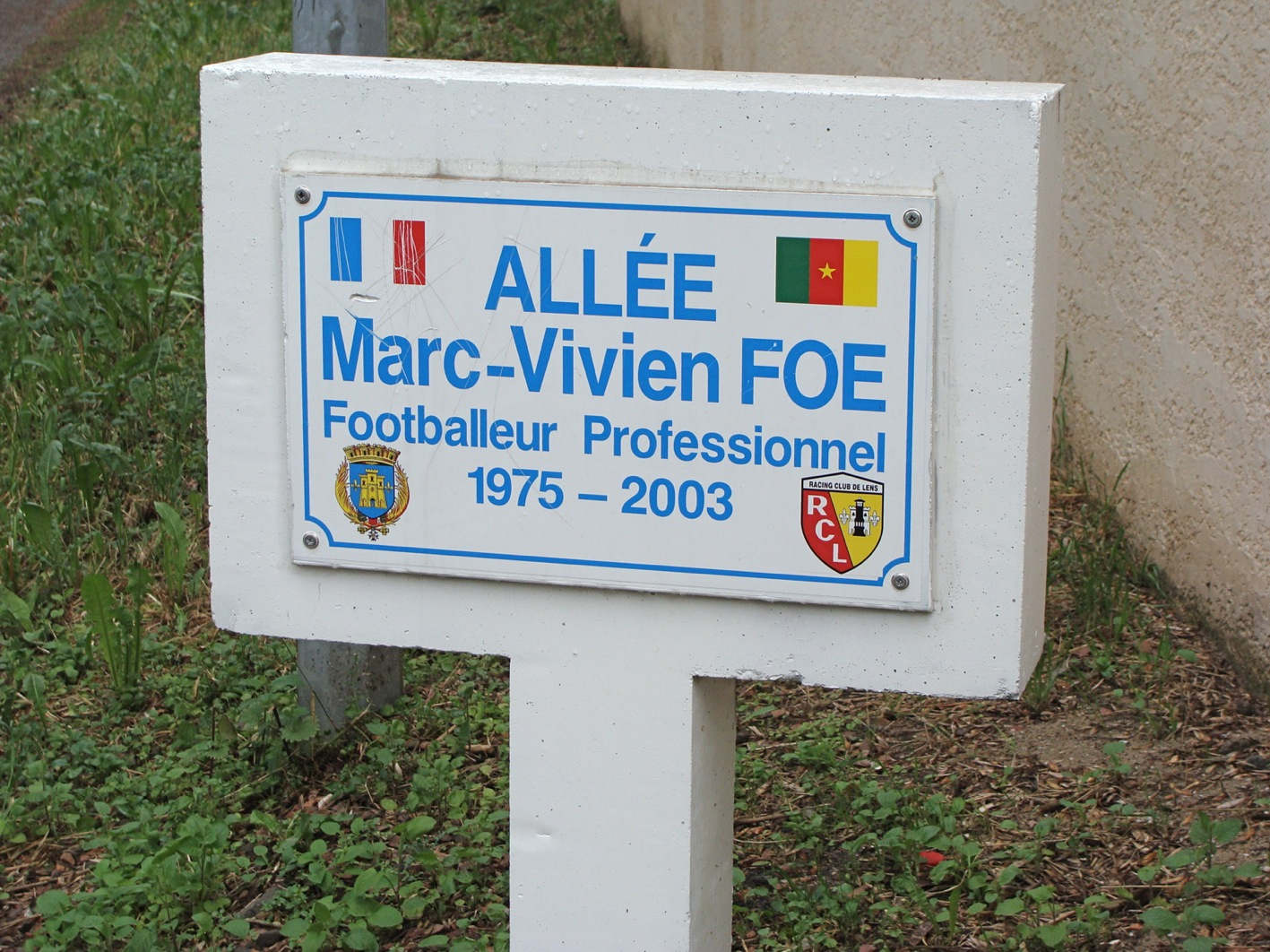
Marc-Vivien Foé streetway, between Louvre-Lens and Bollaert stadium (Lens)

On 26 June 2003, Cameroon faced Colombia in the semi-final, held at the Stade de Gerland in Lyon, France. In the 72nd minute of the match, with Cameroon winning 1–0 (Pius N'Diefi scored the only goal of the match), Foé collapsed in the centre circle with no other players near him. After attempts to resuscitate him on the pitch, he was stretchered off the field, where he received mouth-to-mouth resuscitation and oxygen. Medics spent 45 minutes attempting to restart his heart and although he was still alive upon arrival at the stadium's medical centre, he died shortly afterwards. A first autopsy did not determine an exact cause of death, but a second autopsy concluded that Foé's death was heart-related, as it discovered evidence of hypertrophic cardiomyopathy, a hereditary condition known to increase the risk of sudden death during physical exercise.

Foé's widow Marie-Louise stated that he had been ill with gastric problems and dysentery before his final match, but he was adamant about playing in his adopted hometown of Lyon. Cameroon manager Winfried Schäfer wanted to substitute him minutes before his collapse, observing that the player seemed fatigued, but he signalled that he wanted to continue.

In the 2003 FIFA Confederations Cup final at the Stade de France in Paris, Cameroon were defeated 1–0 by hosts France. As a mark of respect, the captain of each team – Rigobert Song of Cameroon and Marcel Desailly of France – held a picture of Foé as they led their sides out. A minute of silence was also observed before the match, with the players from both teams intermingling and linking arms in the centre circle. All the Cameroon players wore Foé's number 17 on their warm-up shirts, with his name written on the back. Foé was awarded the FIFA Confederations Cup Bronze Ball, as the third-most valuable player of the tournament.

== Personal life ==
Foé was a practising Roman Catholic and donated money to charity regularly. He held Cameroonian and French nationalities.

=== Tributes ===
Foé's death caused a profound shock. Numerous tributes to his joyous personality and infectious humour were expressed in the media. France national team player Thierry Henry and other French players pointed to the sky in tribute to Foé after Henry had opened the scoring against Turkey in their Confederations Cup semi-final that evening.

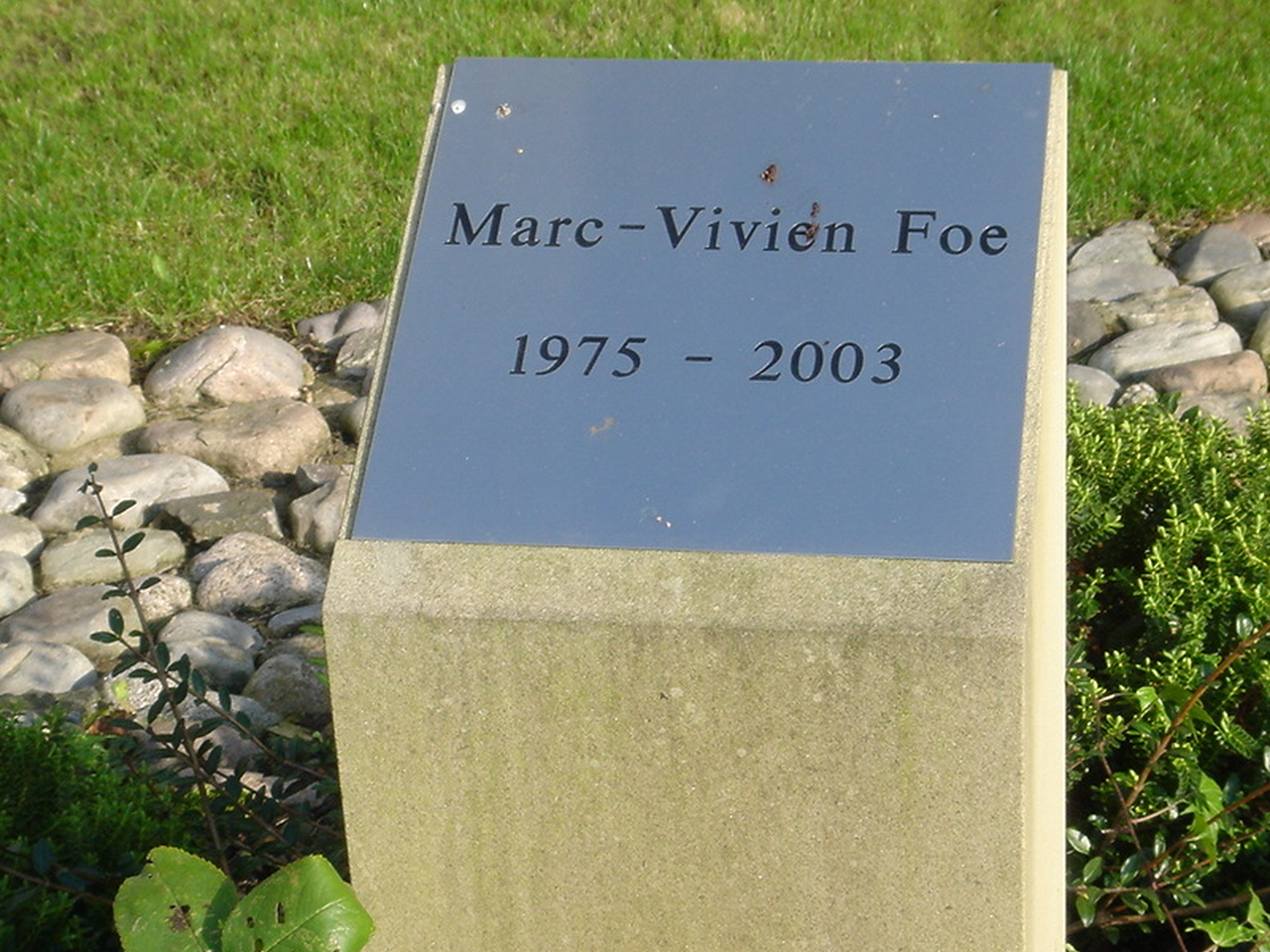
Tribute plaque at the City of Manchester Stadium

It was suggested that the Confederations Cup and the Stade Gerland could have been renamed after him, and Manchester City manager Kevin Keegan announced that the club would no longer use the number 23 shirt Foé wore during his successful season there. At Manchester City's former ground, Maine Road, there is a small memorial to him in the stadium's memorial garden, and on the walls of the players' tunnel are plaques paid for by supporters, with their names, dubbed the Walk of Pride. The first plaque on the wall is for Marc and reads "Marc Vivien Foé – 1975–2003". His first club, Lens, gave his name to an avenue near the Stade Félix Bollaert. Foé was given a state funeral in Cameroon.

Similar to Manchester City, Lens decided to withdraw the number 17 shirt that Foé wore for five years. Lyon also decided to withdraw the number 17 shirt that Foé also wore a year before during the time which he played at the Stade de Gerland. People in Lyon were shocked, as he had received a warm welcome on his return to the stadium. However, when fellow Cameroonian Jean II Makoun was transferred to Lyon, Makoun took up the number 17 shirt, explaining that he wore the number: "In memory of Marc, for me and for the whole Cameroon, this will be for something". Cameroon also attempted to retire Foé's number 17 shirt, but were blocked from doing so by FIFA rules.

Prior to the kick-off of the 2009 FIFA Confederations Cup final between the United States and Brazil, his son, then fourteen years old, gave a brief speech in memory of his father.

== Career statistics ==
=== Club ===
Appearances and goals by club, season and competition
Club	Season	League			National Cup		League Cup		Continental		Total	
Club	Season	Division	Apps	Goals	Apps	Goals	Apps	Goals	Apps	Goals	Apps	Goals
Lens	1994–95	Division 1	15	3							15	3
Lens	1995–96	Division 1	19	2							19	2
Lens	1996–97	Division 1	28	2							28	2
Lens	1997–98	Division 1	18	2					0	0	18	2
Lens	1998–99	Division 1	5	2					1	0	6	2
Lens	Total		85	11					1	0	86	11
West Ham United	1998–99	Premier League	13	0	0	0	0	0	0	0	13	0
West Ham United	1999–2000	Premier League	25	1	1	0	3	0	3	1	32	2
West Ham United	Total		38	1	1	0	3	0	3	1	45	2
Lyon	2000–01	Division 1	25	1	3	0	3	0	8	1	39	2
Lyon	2001–02	Division 1	18	2	0	0	0	0	8	0	26	2
Lyon	Total		43	3	3	0	3	0	16	1	65	4
Manchester City (loan)	2002–03	Premier League	35	9	1	0	2	0	0	0	38	9
Career total			201	24	5	0	8	0	20	2	234	26

=== International ===
Appearances and goals by national team and year
National team	Year	Apps	Goals
Cameroon	1993	2	0
Cameroon	1994	6	0
Cameroon	1995	2	1
Cameroon	1996	4	0
Cameroon	1997	6	0
Cameroon	1998	5	0
Cameroon	1999	2	0
Cameroon	2000	8	3
Cameroon	2001	9	2
Cameroon	2002	14	2
Cameroon	2003	4	0
Total		62	8

=== International goals ===
Cameroon score listed first, score column indicates score after each Foé goal.

International goals by date, venue, cap, opponent, score, result and competition
No.	Date	Venue	Cap	Opponent	Score	Result	Competition
1	24 December 1995	Stade Ahmadou Ahidjo, Yaoundé, Cameroon	10	Liberia	1–0	1–0	Friendly
2	22 January 2000	Accra Sports Stadium, Accra, Ghana	28	Ghana	1–0	1–1	2000 African Cup of Nations
3	6 February 2000	Accra Sports Stadium, Accra, Ghana	31	Algeria	2–0	2–1	2000 African Cup of Nations
4	19 April 2000	Stade Ahmadou Ahidjo, Yaoundé, Cameroon	34	Somalia	2–0	3–0	2002 FIFA World Cup qualification
5	1 July 2001	Stade Ahmadou Ahidjo, Yaoundé, Cameroon	42	Togo	2–0	2–0	2002 FIFA World Cup qualification
6	14 July 2001	Independence Stadium, Lusaka, Zambia	43	Zambia	1–0	2–2	2002 FIFA World Cup qualification
7	7 January 2002	Stade du 4 Août, Ouagadougou, Burkina Faso	45	Burkina Faso	1–0	3–1	Friendly
8	7 February 2002	Stade du 26 Mars, Bamako, Mali	51	Mali	3–0	3–0	2002 African Cup of Nations

== Honours ==
=== Player ===
Canon Yaoundé

- Cameroonian Cup: 1993

Lens

- Division 1: 1997–98

West Ham United

- UEFA Intertoto Cup: 1999

Lyon

- Division 1: 2001–02
- Coupe de la Ligue: 2000–01

Cameroon

- African Cup of Nations: 2000, 2002
- FIFA Confederations Cup: runner up, 2003

=== Individual ===
- FIFA Confederations Cup Bronze Ball: 2003

== See also ==
- List of association footballers who died while playing
