= Steve Marlet =

French footballer (born 1974)

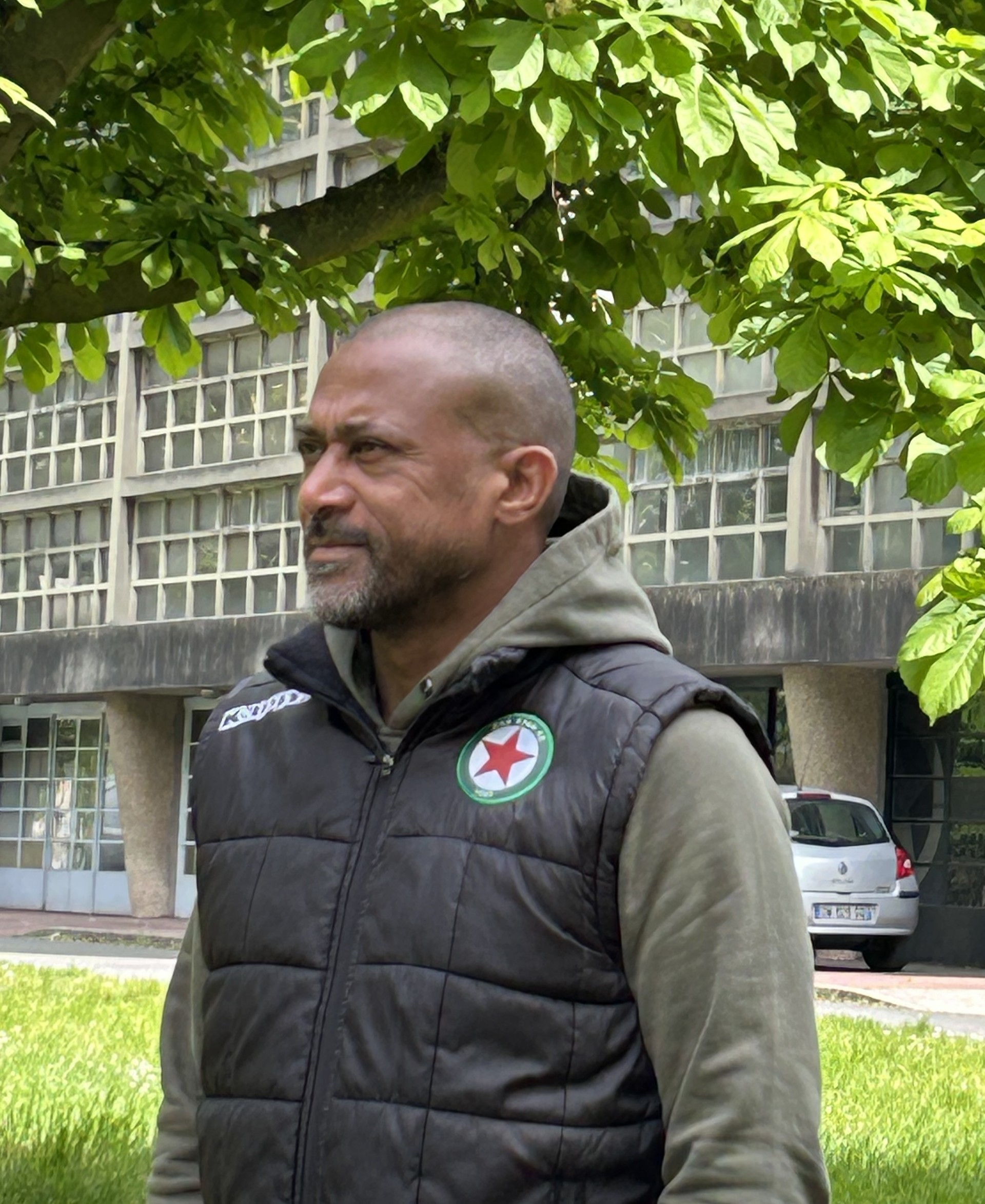
- Marlet in 2024

Personal information
- Full name: Steve Marlet
- Date of birth: 10 January 1974 (age 52)
- Place of birth: Pithiviers, Loiret, France
- Height: 1.80 m (5 ft 11 in)
- Positions: Forward; winger

Senior career*
Years	Team	Apps	(Gls)
1991–1996	Red Star	137	(40)
1996–2000	Auxerre	107	(25)
2000–2001	Lyon	36	(13)
2001–2005	Fulham	55	(11)
2003–2005	→ Marseille (loan)	54	(16)
2005–2006	VfL Wolfsburg	21	(1)
2006–2007	Lorient	22	(1)
2009–2011	Aubervilliers	44	(13)
2011–2012	Red Star	20	(2)
Total		496	(122)

International career
2000–2004	France	23	(6)
Medal record
Men's football
Representing France
FIFA Confederations Cup
Winner	2001
Winner	2003
- * Club domestic league appearances and goals

Steve Marlet (French: [stiv maʁlɛ]; born 10 January 1974) is a French former professional footballer who played as a forward. He was capped 23 times and scored six goals for the France national team, winning the Confederations Cup in 2001 and 2003 and featuring at Euro 2004.

== Early life ==
Marlet was born in Pithiviers, Loiret.

== Club career ==
=== Early career ===
Marlet began his professional career with Red Star.

=== Fulham ===
Marlet held the record for Fulham's biggest transfer fee until July 2008, as the newly promoted Premier League team paid £11.5 million to sign him in August 2001 from Lyon. His expectations was well received by France national team coach Roger Lemerre, suggesting: "He will progress at Fulham". However, he only managed eleven goals in 54 league games, as then-manager Jean Tigana was dismissed during the season. He played just one game in the 2003–04 season for Fulham, in which he scored. He was then loaned out to Marseille on 27 August, with an option to sign permanently.

While on loan, Marlet partnered Didier Drogba up front as Marseille advanced through the 2003-04 UEFA Cup, before losing the final to Valencia.

Marlet's poor performances for Fulham led to chairman Mohamed Al-Fayed taking Tigana to the Court of Arbitration for Sport for the high transfer fee. Tigana, who had ties to Lyon and had briefly been Marlet's agent, was accused of signing him for an exorbitant fee and taking a cut of the fee for himself. The charges were quickly dropped.

=== Wolfsburg and Lorient ===
On 21 August 2005, after his release from Fulham, Marlet signed a one-year deal with the option for a second year, at VfL Wolfsburg of the German Bundesliga. On his arrival, manager Thomas Strunz said: "Steve Marlet is very well-known in international football, a player who is fast and versatile".

Marlet only scored one Bundesliga goal and was not given the second year of his contract. He trained for two weeks with Paris St. Germain before signing a one-year deal at Lorient, newly promoted to Ligue 1. He was attracted by the attacking style of manager Christian Gourcuff.

=== Later career ===
After being released by Lorient, he went on trial with Ipswich Town from 6 to 30 October 2007, Chicago Fire and Reims.

In July 2011, he joined Red Star in the third tier of French football, the Championnat National, where he spent the last season of his career.

== Career statistics ==
=== Club ===
Appearances and goals by club, season and competition
Club	Season	League		
Club	Season	Division	Apps	Goals
Red Star	1990–91		0	0
Red Star	1991–92		7	1
Red Star	1992–93		31	5
Red Star	1993–94	Ligue 2	40	9
Red Star	1994–95	Ligue 2	24	9
Red Star	1995–96	Ligue 2	35	16
Red Star	Total		137	40
Auxerre	1996–97	Ligue 1	24	3
Auxerre	1997–98	Ligue 1	18	6
Auxerre	1998–99	Ligue 1	32	7
Auxerre	1999–2000	Ligue 1	33	9
Auxerre	Total		106	25
Lyon	2000–01	Ligue 1	31	12
Lyon	2001–02	Ligue 1	5	1
Lyon	Total		36	13
Fulham	2001–02	Premier League	26	6
Fulham	2002–03	Premier League	28	4
Fulham	2003–04	Premier League	1	1
Fulham	Total		55	11
Marseille (loan)	2003–04	Ligue 1	23	9
Marseille (loan)	2004–05	Ligue 1	31	7
Marseille (loan)	Total		54	16
VfL Wolfsburg	2005–06	Bundesliga	21	1
Lorient	2006–07	Ligue 1	22	1
Career total			431	107

=== International ===
Scores and results list France's goal tally first, score column indicates score after each Marlet goal.

List of international goals scored by Steve Marlet
No.	Date	Venue	Opponent	Score	Result	Competition
1	30 May 2001	Daegu World Cup Stadium, Daegu, South Korea	South Korea	1–0	5–0	2001 FIFA Confederations Cup
2	27 March 2002	Stade de France, Saint-Denis, France	Scotland	5–0	5–0	Friendly
3	12 October 2002	Stade de France, Saint-Denis, France	Slovenia	2–0	5–0	UEFA Euro 2004 qualifying
4	12 October 2002	Stade de France, Saint-Denis, France	Slovenia	3–0	5–0	UEFA Euro 2004 qualifying
5	20 August 2003	Stade de Genève, Geneva, Switzerland	Switzerland	2–0	2–0	Friendly match
6	28 May 2004	Stade de la Mosson, Montpellier, France	Andorra	4–0	4–0	Friendly match

== Honours ==
Lyon

- Coupe de la Ligue: 2000–01

Fulham

- UEFA Intertoto Cup: 2002

France

- FIFA Confederations Cup: 2001, 2003
