= Cláudio Caçapa =

Brazilian footballer (born 1976)

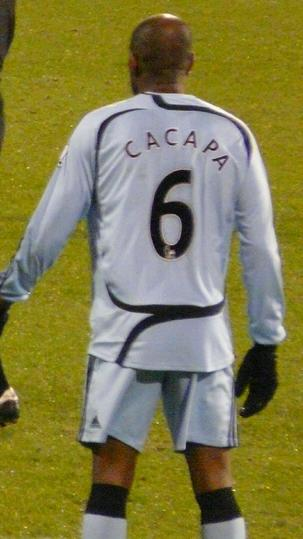
- Caçapa playing for Newcastle United

Personal information
- Full name: Cláudio Roberto da Silva
- Date of birth: 29 May 1976 (age 50)
- Place of birth: Lavras, Brazil
- Height: 1.80 m (5 ft 11 in)
- Position: Centre-back

Senior career*
Years	Team	Apps	(Gls)
1996–2001	Atlético Mineiro	68	(2)
2001	→ Lyon (loan)	6	(1)
2001–2007	Lyon	119	(6)
2007–2009	Newcastle United	25	(1)
2009–2010	Cruzeiro	22	(1)
2011	Évian	12	(1)
2011	Avaí	6	(0)
Total		262	(13)

International career
2000–2001	Brazil	3	(0)

Managerial career
- 2013–2015: Brazil U15
- 2016–2023: Lyon (assistant)
- 2023: Botafogo (interim)
- 2023–2024: RWD Molenbeek
- 2025–2026: Botafogo (assistant)
- 2025: Botafogo (interim)
- 2026: Confiança
- * Club domestic league appearances and goals

Cláudio Roberto da Silva (born 29 May 1976), commonly known as Cláudio Caçapa or simply Caçapa (Brazilian Portuguese: [kaˈsapɐ]), is a Brazilian football coach and former player who played as a central defender.

Having made his senior debut in 1996 for Atlético Mineiro, Caçapa went on to play for Lyon, Newcastle United, Cruzeiro, Évian and Avaí. He was capped three times by the Brazil national team.

== Club career ==
=== Atlético Mineiro ===
Caçapa began his career in 1996 with Brazilian club Atlético Mineiro, where he established himself as a first team regular. He received the Bola de Prata (Silver Ball) award in 1999 after being voted the best defender in Série A that season.

=== Lyon ===
In 2001, Caçapa began attracting interest from European clubs and joined Lyon on loan in 2001. He played his first game in the French Ligue 1 championship on 17 February 2001 and scored in the 2001 Coupe de la Ligue Final which Lyon won after extra time. In the summer, he signed a five-year contract with the club. He was captain of Lyon for five seasons, winning the French championship in each of these seasons. He became a French citizen in October 2006 after living in the country for over five years.

His contract with Lyon expired in the summer of 2007 and he refused to sign a new deal with the club.

=== Newcastle United ===
Caçapa signed for Newcastle United on a Free transfer after his contract with previous club Lyon expired, on 3 August 2007, signing an initial two-year deal with an option for a third. He made his debut for Newcastle as an 89th-minute substitute during the goalless draw against Aston Villa on 18 August, and in doing so he became the 1,000th player to represent the Magpies in a competitive match.

He scored his first goal for the club with a header against Tottenham Hotspur on 22 October in a 3–1 win. On 3 November, Caçapa was substituted out of Newcastle's game against Portsmouth after only 18 minutes. It was later announced that his poor play in the game was due to a "slight hamstring strain". He returned to the Newcastle squad on 15 December, when he was named Man of the Match in their away win at Fulham.

He scored his second goal for Newcastle on 16 January 2008 when they went through to the FA Cup 4th Round after a 4–1 replay victory over Stoke City. He was ruled out for five weeks on 22 March after suffering a groin injury before the 2–0 win over Fulham.

In the 2008–09 season he was utilised both as a defender and a midfielder due to Newcastle having both a small squad and numerous injuries to players. Most of Caçapa's 2008–09 campaign was blighted by injury. He made his last appearance in December, failing to appear throughout 2009 as Newcastle were relegated before being released on 1 July 2009 when his contract expired.

=== Cruzeiro ===
After the Newcastle contract expired, he joined Atlético Mineiro archrivals Cruzeiro, where he played until the end of the 2010 Campeonato Brasileiro Série A.

=== Évian ===
Caçapa returned to France to join Évian in the Ligue 2 when he signed for a six-months contract on 25 January 2011. He helped the club to win the Ligue 2 and achieve promotion to the Ligue 1 for their first time in their history.

=== Avaí ===
After his contract with Évian expired, he received an offer from Avaí and agreed to sign for the club on 25 July 2011. He was released from his contract after the end of the season and announced his retirement on 20 March 2012, also opening a football school called Arena Lyon in his hometown Lavras.

== International career ==
Caçapa's impressive form at Atlético Mineiro was rewarded with a call-up to the Brazil national team. He made his debut for his country on 23 February 2000 against Thailand and went on to make three international appearances and one unofficial international appearance in a match against Japanese club Tokyo Verdy.

== Managerial career ==
Caçapa was hired as the manager of Brazil's under 15 national team in December 2013. He was sacked on 27 February 2015. He was appointed as the assistant manager of Lyon in January 2016.

On 30 June 2023, Caçapa was named interim head coach of Botafogo back in his home country.

On 25 July 2023, Caçapa was named RWD Molenbeek new head coach. On 11 February 2024, he parted ways with the club.

On 13 February 2025, Caçapa returned to Botafogo as a permanent assistant coach, being also named interim head coach of the main squad. In July that year, he was reappointed as interim coach following the sacking of Renato Paiva.

Caçapa returned to the assistant role after the arrival of Davide Ancelotti, and left Fogão on 24 February 2026, after being appointed head coach of Série C side Confiança. On 10 May, after nine defeats in 18 matches, he was dismissed from the latter.

== Managerial statistics ==
As of 11 May 2026

Managerial record by team and tenure
Team	Nat.	From	To	Record								Ref
Team	Nat.	From	To	G	W	D	L	GF	GA	GD	Win %	Ref
Botafogo (interim)	(Brazil)	1 July 2023	9 July 2023	4	4	0	0	8	0	+8	100.00	
RWD Molenbeek	(Belgium)	25 July 2023	11 February 2024	29	7	7	15	29	56	−27	24.14	
Botafogo (interim)	(Brazil)	13 February 2025	28 February 2025	3	0	1	2	1	4	−3	0.00	
Botafogo (interim)	(Brazil)	12 July 2025	12 July 2025	1	1	0	0	2	0	+2	100.00	
Confiança	(Brazil)	24 February 2026	10 May 2026	18	5	4	9	15	19	−4	27.78	
Career total				55	17	12	26	55	79	−24	30.91	—

== Honours ==
Atlético Mineiro

- Campeonato Mineiro: 1997
- Copa CONMEBOL: 1997

Lyon

- Ligue 1: 2001–02, 2002–03, 2003–04, 2004–05, 2005–06, 2006–07
- Coupe de la Ligue: 2000–01
- Trophée des Champions: 2002, 2003, 2004, 2005, 2006

Évian

- Ligue 2: 2010–11
