= 2003–04 Olympique Lyonnais season =

Lyon
2003–04 season
- Owner: OL Groupe
- President: Jean-Michel Aulas
- Head coach: Paul Le Guen
- Stadium: Stade de Gerland
- Ligue 1: 1st (champions)
- Coupe de France: Round of 16
- Coupe de la Ligue: Round of 32
- Trophée des Champions: Winners
- Champions League: Quarter-finals
- Top goalscorer: League: Péguy Luyindula (16); All: Péguy Luyindula (19)
- Average home league attendance: 36,022
Home colours	Away colours	Third colours

The 2003–04 season was the 105th season in the existence of Olympique Lyonnais and the club's 15th consecutive season in the top flight of French football. They participated in the Ligue 1, the Coupe de France, the Coupe de la Ligue, the Trophée des Champions and UEFA Champions League.

== First-team squad ==
Squad at end of season

Note: Flags indicate national team as defined under FIFA eligibility rules; some limited exceptions apply. Players may hold more than one non-FIFA nationality.

No.	Pos.	Nation	Player
1	GK	FRA	Grégory Coupet
2	DF	BEL	Éric Deflandre
3	DF	BRA	Edmílson
4	MF	GHA	Michael Essien
5	DF	BRA	Caçapa
7	MF	MLI	Mahamadou Diarra
8	MF	BRA	Juninho Pernambucano
9	FW	BRA	Giovane Élber
10	MF	FRA	Eric Carrière
11	MF	FRA	Florent Malouda
12	DF	FRA	Anthony Réveillère
14	MF	FRA	Sidney Govou
15	DF	BEL	Christophe Delmotte

No.	Pos.	Nation	Player
18	FW	FRA	Peguy Luyindula
20	DF	SUI	Patrick Müller (captain)
22	DF	FRA	Romain Sartre
23	DF	FRA	Jérémy Berthod
24	MF	FRA	Vikash Dhorasoo
25	GK	FRA	Rémy Vercoutre
27	FW	FRA	Julien Viale
29	MF	FRA	Yohan Gomez
30	GK	FRA	Nicolas Puydebois
31	MF	FRA	Bryan Bergougnoux
32	DF	FRA	François Clerc
35	GK	FRA	Fabien Caballero
36	MF	FRA	Jérémy Clément

=== Left club during season ===
Note: Flags indicate national team as defined under FIFA eligibility rules; some limited exceptions apply. Players may hold more than one non-FIFA nationality.

No.	Pos.	Nation	Player
6	MF	FRA	Philippe Violeau (to Auxerre)
13	DF	FRA	Jérémie Bréchet (to Inter Milan)
26	DF	FRA	Gaël Genevier (on loan to Perugia)

== Competitions ==
=== Overview ===
Competition	First match	Last match	Starting round	Final position	Record							
Competition	First match	Last match	Starting round	Final position	Pld	W	D	L	GF	GA	GD	Win %
Ligue 1	1 August 2003	23 May 2004	Matchday 1	Winners	38	24	7	7	64	26	+38	63.16
Coupe de France	3 January 2004	11 February 2004	Round of 64	Round of 16	3	2	0	1	10	4	+6	66.67
Coupe de la Ligue	28 October 2003		Round of 32	Round of 32	1	0	1	0	1	1	+0	0.00
Trophée des Champions	26 July 2003		Final	Winners	1	1	0	0	2	1	+1	100.00
UEFA Champions League	17 September 2003	7 April 2004	Group stage	Quarter-finals	10	5	2	3	11	11	+0	50.00
Total					53	32	10	11	88	43	+45	60.38

Source: Competitions

=== Trophée des Champions ===
26 July 2003 Final	Lyon	2–1	Auxerre	Lyon
17:45 CEST (UTC+2)	Essien 5'; Diarra 9'		Kapo 83'	Stadium: Stade de Gerland; Attendance: 18,254; Referee: Laurent Duhamel

=== Ligue 1 ===
==== League table ====
Pos	Team	Pld	W	D	L	GF	GA	GD	Pts	Qualification or relegation
1	Lyon (C)	38	24	7	7	64	26	+38	79	Qualification to Champions League group stage
2	Paris Saint-Germain	38	22	10	6	50	28	+22	76	Qualification to Champions League group stage
3	Monaco	38	21	12	5	59	30	+29	75	Qualification to Champions League third qualifying round
4	Auxerre	38	19	8	11	60	34	+26	65	Qualification to UEFA Cup first round
5	Sochaux	38	18	9	11	54	42	+12	63	Qualification to UEFA Cup first round

Source: Ligue 1
Rules for classification: 1) points; 2) goal difference; 3) number of goals scored.
(C) Champions

==== Results summary ====
Overall								Home						Away					
Pld	W	D	L	GF	GA	GD	Pts	W	D	L	GF	GA	GD	W	D	L	GF	GA	GD
38	24	7	7	64	26	+38	79	13	4	2	39	8	+31	11	3	5	25	18	+7

Source: Ligue 1

==== Results by round ====
Round	1	2	3	4	5	6	7	8	9	10	11	12	13	14	15	16	17	18	19	20	21	22	23	24	25	26	27	28	29	30	31	32	33	34	35	36	37	38
Ground	A	H	A	H	A	H	A	H	A	H	A	H	A	H	A	H	H	A	H	A	H	A	H	A	H	A	H	A	H	A	H	A	H	A	A	H	A	H
Result	L	W	W	D	L	D	W	W	W	D	W	W	W	W	L	W	W	D	D	L	W	W	L	W	W	D	W	W	W	W	L	W	W	D	W	W	L	W
Position	17	8	4	6	8	11	7	3	3	5	3	2	2	2	2	2	2	2	2	2	2	2	3	2	2	2	2	2	1	1	2	1	1	1	1	1	1	1

Source: Ligue 1
A = Away; H = Home; W = Win; D = Draw; L = Loss

==== Matches ====
1 August 2003 1	Lille	1–0	Lyon	Lille
20:45 CEST (UTC+2)	Makoun 12'	Report		Stadium: Stade Grimonprez-Jooris; Attendance: 16,443; Referee: Gilles Veissière

9 August 2003 2	Lyon	3–1	Monaco	Lyon
20:00 CEST (UTC+2)	Squillaci 16' (o.g.); Essien 26'; Rodriguez 44' (o.g.)	Report	Nonda 56'	Stadium: Stade de Gerland; Attendance: 39,726; Referee: Damien Ledentu

16 August 2003 3	Montpellier	0–2	Lyon	Montpellier
20:00 CEST (UTC+2)		Report	Caçapa 11'; Carrière 26'	Stadium: Stade de la Mosson; Attendance: 18,814; Referee: Alain Sars

23 August 2003 4	Lyon	0–0	Toulouse	Lyon
20:00 CEST (UTC+2)		Report		Stadium: Stade de Gerland; Attendance: 35,192; Referee: Stéphane Moulin

30 August 2003 5	Guingamp	2–0	Lyon	Guingamp
17:15 CEST (UTC+2)	Dagano 33'; Fuentes 39'	Report		Stadium: Stade de Roudourou; Attendance: 11,610; Referee: Pascal Viléo

13 September 2003 6	Lyon	1–1	Auxerre	Lyon
17:15 CEST (UTC+2)	Élber 43'	Report	Cissé 29'	Stadium: Stade de Gerland; Attendance: 38,321; Referee: Bertrand Layec

21 September 2003 7	Le Mans	0–2	Lyon	Le Mans
18:30 CEST (UTC+2)		Report	Élber 11', 88'	Stadium: Stade Léon-Bollée; Attendance: 13,478; Referee: Hervé Piccirillo

27 September 2003 8	Lyon	4–0	Lens	Lyon
17:15 CEST (UTC+2)	Juninho 10', 41', 57'; Réveillère 25'	Report		Stadium: Stade de Gerland; Attendance: 33,695; Referee: Gilles Veissière

4 October 2003 9	Ajaccio	2–4	Lyon	Ajaccio
20:00 CEST (UTC+2)	Diomède 45'; Mitrović 90+3'	Report	Luyindula 15', 71', 88'; Malouda 68'	Stadium: Stade François Coty; Attendance: 3,268; Referee: Stéphane Bré

18 October 2003 10	Lyon	1–1	Sochaux	Lyon
20:00 CEST (UTC+2)	Luyindula 65'	Report	Isabey 63'	Stadium: Stade de Gerland; Attendance: 37,029; Referee: Claude Colombo

25 October 2003 11	Nantes	0–1	Lyon	Nantes
17:15 CEST (UTC+2)		Report	Juninho 67'	Stadium: Stade de la Beaujoire; Attendance: 33,249; Referee: Damien Ledentu

1 November 2003 12	Lyon	5–0	Nice	Lyon
17:15 CET (UTC+1)	Juninho 25', 73'; Malouda 28'; Élber 40'; Govou 45'	Report		Stadium: Stade de Gerland; Attendance: 34,034; Referee: Stéphane Lannoy

9 November 2003 13	Marseille	1–4	Lyon	Marseille
21:00 CET (UTC+1)	Van Buyten 20'	Report	Élber 19'; Luyindula 38', 58'; Juninho 90+2'	Stadium: Stade Vélodrome; Attendance: 56,207; Referee: Bertrand Layec

21 November 2003 14	Lyon	1–0	Strasbourg	Lyon
20:30 CET (UTC+1)	Luyindula 90' (pen.)	Report		Stadium: Stade de Gerland; Attendance: 33,682; Referee: Gilles Veissière

29 November 2003 15	Rennes	3–1	Lyon	Rennes
17:15 CET (UTC+1)	Arribagé 25'; Puydebois 39' (o.g.); Frei 74'	Report	Malouda 21'	Stadium: Stade de la Route de Lorient; Attendance: 15,511; Referee: Bruno Derrien

5 December 2003 17	Lyon	2–1	Metz	Lyon
19:00 CET (UTC+1)	Luyindula 27'; Edmílson 48'	Report	Jager 21'	Stadium: Stade de Gerland; Attendance: 31,999; Referee: Alain Hamer

13 December 2003 18	Bastia	0–0	Lyon	Furiani
20:00 CET (UTC+1)		Report		Stadium: Stade Armand Cesari; Attendance: 5,492; Referee: Laurent Duhamel

19 December 2003 19	Lyon	1–1	Paris Saint-Germain	Lyon
21:00 CET (UTC+1)	Carrière 82'	Report	Pauleta 41'	Stadium: Stade de Gerland; Attendance: 36,720; Referee: Stéphane Bré

9 January 2004 20	Monaco	3–0	Lyon	Monaco
21:00 CET (UTC+1)	Giuly 33', 89' (pen.); Morientes 47'	Report		Stadium: Stade Louis II; Attendance: 15,674; Referee: René Temmink

17 January 2004 21	Lyon	3–0	Montpellier	Lyon
20:00 CET (UTC+1)	Dhorasoo 10'; Luyindula 36'; Viale 90'	Report		Stadium: Stade de Gerland; Attendance: 32,658; Referee: Bruno Derrien

28 January 2004 16	Lyon	3–0	Bordeaux	Lyon
21:00 CET (UTC+1)	Müller 65'; Luyindula 67'; Essien 81'	Report		Stadium: Stade de Gerland; Attendance: 32,363; Referee: Damien Ledentu

31 January 2004 22	Toulouse	0–1	Lyon	Toulouse
20:00 CET (UTC+1)		Report	Dhorasoo 60'	Stadium: Stadium de Toulouse; Attendance: 26.297; Referee: Pascal Viléo

7 February 2004 23	Lyon	0–1	Guingamp	Lyon
20:00 CET (UTC+1)		Report	Saveljić 90+2'	Stadium: Stade de Gerland; Attendance: 34,523; Referee: Thierry Auriac

15 February 2004 24	Auxerre	1–2	Lyon	Auxerre
20:45 CET (UTC+1)	Boumsong 75'	Report	Violeau 8' (o.g.); Luyindula 69'	Stadium: Stade de l'Abbé-Deschamps; Attendance: 17,000; Referee: Claude Colombo

21 February 2004 25	Lyon	2–0	Le Mans	Lyon
17:15 CET (UTC+1)	Malouda 23'; Govou 61'	Report		Stadium: Stade de Gerland; Attendance: 35,811; Referee: Philippe Kalt

28 February 2004 26	Lens	1–1	Lyon	Lens
20:00 CET (UTC+1)	Eloi 72'	Report	Dhorasoo 34'	Stadium: Stade Félix-Bollaert; Attendance: 32,230; Referee: Stéphane Moulin

5 March 2004 27	Lyon	4–0	Ajaccio	Lyon
20:00 CET (UTC+1)	Terrier 43' (o.g.); Rodrigo 48' (o.g.); Élber 51'; Luyindula 75'	Report		Stadium: Stade de Gerland; Attendance: 35,829; Referee: Pascal Garibian

13 March 2004 28	Sochaux	1–2	Lyon	Montbéliard
20:00 CET (UTC+1)	Santos 28'	Report	Élber 3'; Edmílson 65'	Stadium: Stade Auguste Bonal; Attendance: 19,495; Referee: Gilles Veissière

20 March 2004 29	Lyon	1–0	Nantes	Lyon
17:15 CET (UTC+1)	Élber 27'	Report		Stadium: Stade de Gerland; Attendance: 35,643; Referee: Bruno Ruffray

27 March 2004 30	Nice	0–1	Lyon	Nice
20:00 CET (UTC+1)		Report	Élber 17'	Stadium: Stade du Ray; Attendance: 12,784; Referee: Stéphane Bré

3 April 2004 31	Lyon	1–2	Marseille	Lyon
17:15 CEST (UTC+2)	Luyindula 17'	Report	Drogba 4'; Meriem 84'	Stadium: Stade de Gerland; Attendance: 38,602; Referee: Laurent Duhamel

11 April 2004 32	Strasbourg	0–1	Lyon	Strasbourg
20:45 CEST (UTC+2)		Report	Luyindula 46'	Stadium: Stade de la Meinau; Attendance: 19,467; Referee: Claude Colombo

24 April 2004 33	Lyon	3–0	Rennes	Lyon
20:00 CEST (UTC+2)	Juninho 57' (pen.); Essien 63'; Luyindula 71'	Report		Stadium: Stade de Gerland; Attendance: 39,869; Referee: Pascal Viléo

2 May 2004 34	Bordeaux	1–1	Lyon	Bordeaux
20:45 CEST (UTC+2)	Chamakh 60'	Report	Dhorasoo 87'	Stadium: Stade Chaban-Delmas; Attendance: 23,637; Referee: Pascal Garibian

8 May 2004 35	Metz	1–2	Lyon	Metz
20:00 CEST (UTC+2)	Maoulida 10'	Report	Juninho 23'; Élber 76'	Stadium: Stade Saint-Symphorien; Attendance: 24,778; Referee: Bertrand Layec

12 May 2004 36	Lyon	1–0	Bastia	Lyon
20:30 CEST (UTC+2)	Juninho 25'	Report		Stadium: Stade de Gerland; Attendance: 38,723; Referee: Hervé Piccirillo

15 May 2004 37	Paris Saint-Germain	1–0	Lyon	Paris
20:00 CEST (UTC+2)	Pauleta 6'	Report		Stadium: Parc des Princes; Attendance: 42,502; Referee: Stéphane Lannoy

23 May 2004 38	Lyon	3–0	Lille	Lyon
20:00 CEST (UTC+2)	Govou 41'; Diarra 52' (pen.); Luyindula 80'	Report		Stadium: Stade de Gerland; Attendance: 40,000; Referee: Stéphane Bré

=== Coupe de France ===
3 January 2004 Round of 64	Aire-sur-la-Lys	0–4	Lyon	Saint-Omer
15:00 CET (UTC+1)			Juninho 4'; Malouda 37'; Élber 60'; Bergougnoux 72'	Stadium: Stade Gaston Bonnet; Attendance: 5,043; Referee: Gael Lecellier

24 January 2004 Round of 32	Bourg-Péronnas	0–5	Lyon	Lyon
15:00 CET (UTC+1)			Govou 25', 81'; Juninho 57'; Lopez 71' (o.g.); Malouda 85'	Stadium: Stade de Gerland; Attendance: 15,000; Referee: Alain Sars

11 February 2004 Round of 16	Monaco	4–1	Lyon	Monaco
17:00 CET (UTC+1)	Morientes 45+1', 58', 62'; Pršo 86'		Élber 14'	Stadium: Stade Louis II; Attendance: 6,000; Referee: Laurent Duhamel

=== Coupe de la Ligue ===
28 October 2003 Round of 32	Lens	1–1 (a.e.t.) (4–3 p)	Lyon	Lens
20:00 CET (UTC+1)	Bak 107'		Luyindula 100'	Stadium: Stade Félix-Bollaert; Attendance: 23,500; Referee: Alain Sars
	Penalties
	Sarr (penalty scored); Moreira (penalty scored); Utaka (penalty missed); Coridon (penalty scored); Bąk (penalty scored)		(penalty scored) Berthod; (penalty missed) Malouda; (penalty scored) Govou; (penalty scored) Essien; (penalty missed) Luyindula

=== UEFA Champions League ===
==== Group stage ====
Pos	Team	Pld	W	D	L	GF	GA	GD	Pts	Qualification
1	(France) Lyon	6	3	1	2	7	7	0	10	Advance to knockout stage
2	(Germany) Bayern Munich	6	2	3	1	6	5	+1	9	Advance to knockout stage
3	(Scotland) Celtic	6	2	1	3	8	7	+1	7	Transfer to UEFA Cup
4	(Belgium) Anderlecht	6	2	1	3	4	6	−2	7	

Source: RSSSF

17 September 2003 1	Lyon (France)	1–0	(Belgium) Anderlecht	Lyon, France
20:45 CEST (UTC+2)	Juninho 25' (pen.)	Report		Stadium: Stade de Gerland; Attendance: 37,002; Referee: Paulo Costa (Portugal)

30 September 2003 2	Celtic (Scotland)	2–0	(France) Lyon	Glasgow, Scotland
19:45 BST (UTC+1)	Miller 70'; Sutton 78'	Report		Stadium: Celtic Park; Attendance: 59,407; Referee: Eduardo Iturralde González (Spain)

21 October 2003 3	Lyon (France)	1–1	(Germany) Bayern Munich	Lyon, France
20:45 CEST (UTC+2)	Luyindula 88'	Report	Makaay 25'	Stadium: Stade de Gerland; Attendance: 37,659; Referee: Ľuboš Micheľ (Slovakia)

5 November 2003 4	Bayern Munich (Germany)	1–2	(France) Lyon	Munich, Germany
20:45 CET (UTC+1)	Makaay 14'	Report	Juninho 6'; Élber 53'	Stadium: Olympic Stadium; Attendance: 59,000; Referee: Graham Barber (England)

25 November 2003 5	Anderlecht (Belgium)	1–0	(France) Lyon	Brussels, Belgium
20:45 CET (UTC+1)	Tihinen 69'	Report		Stadium: Constant Vanden Stock Stadium; Attendance: 20,779; Referee: Domenico Messina (Italy)

10 December 2003 6	Lyon (France)	3–2	(Scotland) Celtic	Lyon, France
20:45 CET (UTC+1)	Élber 6'; Juninho 52', 86' (pen.)	Report	Hartson 24'; Sutton 75'	Stadium: Stade de Gerland; Attendance: 38,659; Referee: Urs Meier (Switzerland)

==== Knockout stage ====
===== Round of 16 =====
25 February 2004 First leg	Real Sociedad (Spain)	0–1	(France) Lyon	San Sebastián, Spain
20:45 CET (UTC+1)		Report	Schürrer 18' (o.g.)	Stadium: Anoeta Stadium; Attendance: 28,000; Referee: Massimo De Santis (Italy)

9 March 2004 Second leg	Lyon (France)	1–0 (2–0 agg.)	(Spain) Real Sociedad	Lyon, France
20:45 CET (UTC+1)	Juninho 77'	Report		Stadium: Stade de Gerland; Attendance: 38,914; Referee: Mike Riley (England)

===== Quarter-finals =====
23 March 2004 First leg	Porto (Portugal)	2–0	(France) Lyon	Porto, Portugal
20:45 GMT (UTC+0)	Deco 44'; Carvalho 71'	Report		Stadium: Estádio do Dragão; Attendance: 46,910; Referee: Terje Hauge (Norway)

7 April 2004 Second leg	Lyon (France)	2–2 (2–4 agg.)	(Portugal) Porto	Lyon, France
20:45 CEST (UTC+2)	Luyindula 14'; Élber 90'	Report	Maniche 6', 47'	Stadium: Stade de Gerland; Attendance: 39,103; Referee: Anders Frisk (Sweden)
