= Florent Malouda =

French footballer (born 1980)

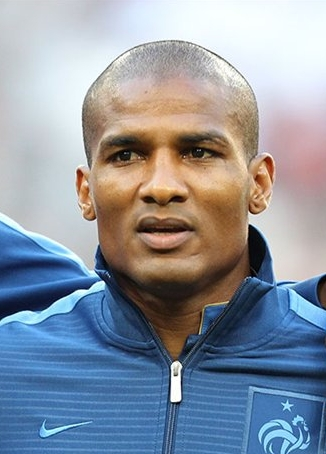
- Malouda with France at UEFA Euro 2012

Personal information
- Full name: Florent Johan Malouda
- Date of birth: 13 June 1980 (age 46)
- Place of birth: Cayenne, French Guiana, France
- Height: 1.81 m (5 ft 11 in)
- Position: Left winger

Youth career
- AJ Saint-Georges
- USL Montjoly
- Rémire
- 1995–1996: Châteauroux

Senior career*
| Years | Team | Apps | (Gls) |
| 1996–2000 | Châteauroux | 59 | (5) |
| 2000–2003 | Guingamp | 82 | (15) |
| 2003–2007 | Lyon | 138 | (25) |
| 2007–2013 | Chelsea | 149 | (35) |
| 2013–2014 | Trabzonspor | 19 | (5) |
| 2014–2015 | Metz | 28 | (3) |
| 2015–2017 | Delhi Dynamos | 32 | (3) |
| 2016 | → Wadi Degla (loan) | 16 | (3) |
| 2018 | FC Differdange 03 | 8 | (0) |
| Total | | 539 | (94) |

International career
| 2004–2012 | France | 80 | (9) |
| 2017 | French Guiana | 4 | (0) |
Medal record
Men's football
Representing France
FIFA World Cup
| Runner-up | 2006 |
- * Club domestic league appearances and goals

Florent Johan Malouda (French pronunciation: [flɔʁɑ̃ maluda]; born 13 June 1980) is a French football coach and former professional player who played as a left winger. Born in French Guiana, he represented both France and French Guiana at the international level.

Malouda spent most of his career at Lyon and Chelsea, winning four consecutive Ligue 1 titles with the former and the UEFA Champions League in 2012 with the latter, among other honours. Malouda represented the France national football team on 80 occasions from 2004 to 2012, including in two FIFA World Cups and two European Championships. He was part of the French team which reached the 2006 World Cup final. In 2017, he played for his home region French Guiana.

== Club career ==
=== Châteauroux ===
Malouda was born in Cayenne, French Guiana. He attracted the interest of scouts from French club Châteauroux and he soon moved to Paris to join the club. Despite the difficulties of living far away from his family home in French Guiana, Malouda was able to continue his studies and play professional football. He played 57 games for Châteauroux, making his senior debut at the age of 16 in Ligue 2.

=== Guingamp ===
Malouda was then signed by top division side Guingamp following Châteauroux's inability to secure a Ligue 1 berth. It was in Guingamp where his talent was showcased in French top-flight football. Under the tutelage of coach Guy Lacombe, Malouda demonstrated his ability and formed a combination with Didier Drogba, whom he would also accompany later in his career at Chelsea.

=== Lyon ===
Malouda's performances began to catch the attention of French club Lyon who, after claiming their second consecutive title during the 2002–03 season, decided to sign Malouda. In an outstanding Lyon team containing Juninho, Michael Essien, Grégory Coupet and Mahamadou Diarra, Malouda established himself on the left side of Lyon's attack, forming great link-ups with all of Lyon's strikers. His performances for Lyon finally earned him a call-up to the France national team.

The highlights of Malouda's career at Lyon were a man of the match display against Real Madrid in the UEFA Champions League and his ten goals which led Lyon to their sixth consecutive Ligue 1 title, both during the 2006–07 season. He also won the Ligue 1 Player of the Year that season, edging teammate Juninho, Lille's Kader Keïta, Toulouse's Johan Elmander and Lens' Seydou Keita to the accolade.

Malouda made public his wish to leave Lyon at the end of the 2006–07 season, with Chelsea, Liverpool and Real Madrid showing interest in the winger. On 29 June 2007, Malouda told Lyon-based newspaper Le Progres that he has his heart set on a move to Chelsea, confirming that Chelsea had lodged a €17 million bid for him. Malouda later repeated this comment in an interview with the Daily Star. On 5 July 2007, Chelsea chief executive Peter Kenyon told Sky Sports News that Chelsea had been in discussions with Lyon regarding Malouda's transfer and were hoping to tie up the deal before Chelsea's pre-season tour of the United States.

=== Chelsea ===
==== 2007–08 ====
On 8 July 2007, Lyon club president Jean-Michel Aulas announced that the club had accepted an undisclosed bid, rumoured to be around £13 million, from Chelsea for Malouda. Chelsea later officially revealed that Malouda would be traveling to London on 9 July for a medical and to discuss personal terms. Malouda had looked set to join Liverpool until their Premier League rivals Chelsea intervened. At 7 pm on the same day, Malouda officially signed a three-year contract with the club. He was handed the number 15 shirt. Chelsea manager José Mourinho described Malouda as a mature and proven player who was up to the challenge of adapting to the fast pace of English football, and hinted that Malouda would be fielded in tandem with Dutch winger Arjen Robben.

Malouda made his debut for Chelsea against Manchester United in the 2007 FA Community Shield on 5 August 2007 in a 1–1 draw; despite Chelsea going on to lose on penalties, he scored in what was an impressive display. Malouda started against Birmingham City on 12 August on the left wing and scored Chelsea's second goal in a 3–2 victory, before being replaced by Steve Sidwell in the 83rd minute, with the win cementing Chelsea's place in the history books by overtaking Liverpool's record of 63-straight home games unbeaten.

On 19 August, Malouda won a penalty awarded by referee Rob Styles in a Premier League match against Liverpool. Replays of the incident indicated Malouda had backed into Liverpool defender Jamie Carragher after trying to leave the ball for the unmarked Didier Drogba. The penalty kick was given and Frank Lampard scored. Referee Rob Styles was dropped from the next weekend Premier League games as a result of this incident and some other contentious decisions during the game. Malouda scored against Schalke 04 in his first Champions League match for Chelsea, squeezing the ball through keeper Manuel Neuer's legs after turning his marker Rafinha. On 23 January, Malouda set up Joe Cole with a long pass to score against Everton in the League Cup; Chelsea won the tie 3–1 on aggregate. On 5 May 2008, Malouda scored his second Premier League goal in the penultimate game of the season against Newcastle United, converting a Frank Lampard through-ball. Malouda ended his first season in English football with two goals and one assist in the league.

==== 2008–09 ====
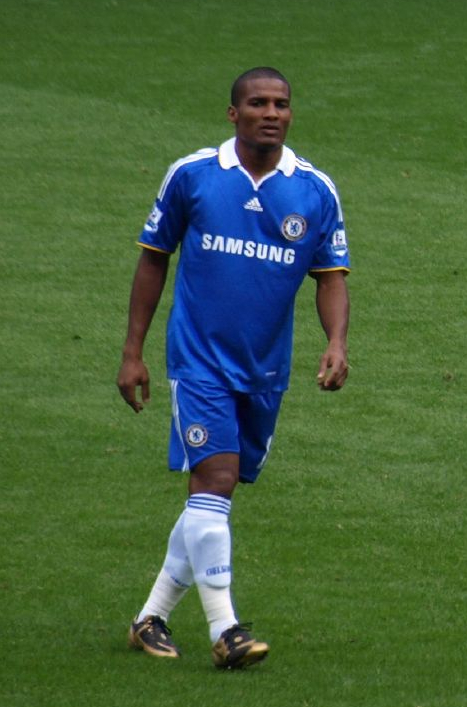
Malouda with Chelsea in 2008

Malouda scored his first two goals in the Luiz Felipe Scolari era against French outfit Bordeaux in the Champions League group stages on 16 September 2008, and in the League Cup third round tie against Portsmouth. Both games went on to be 4–0 victories for Chelsea. His first league goal of the season was against Middlesbrough in a 5–0 win. The Frenchman scored the crucial second goal in a 2–0 win against Newcastle, scoring from Frank Lampard's pass. He then scored the equaliser against Arsenal in what would be a 2–1 victory for Chelsea in their FA Cup semi-final at Wembley Stadium. On 6 May in a Champions League semi final against Barcelona, Malouda was disallowed a potential penalty by the controversial referee, who disallowed numerous other Chelsea appeals for a penalty. He scored the fourth goal in a famous 4–1 victory over Arsenal which was their biggest defeat in the league at home for 38 years. The game marked his 50th Premier League match for the Blues.

In the 2009 FA Cup Final against Everton, he played a pivotal role in Chelsea's 2–1 win setting up Didier Drogba's equaliser but was then later denied a goal when his 36-yard strike hit the underside of the crossbar, despite replays showing it crossed the line. Malouda's impressive form in the last half of the season prompted interest from big teams such as Barcelona and Milan. On 23 June 2009, however, Malouda signed a new four-year deal with Chelsea which would keep him at Stamford Bridge until 2013.

==== 2009–10 ====
After the arrival of Carlo Ancelotti in the 2009–10 season, Malouda found himself playing in a more central role on the left of Ancelotti's preferred diamond formation in midfield. On 12 September 2009 against Stoke City he grabbed the winner on the 94th minute to get Chelsea all three points. On 3 November 2009, Malouda made his 100th appearance for Chelsea in a Champions League match against Atlético Madrid. On 26 December 2009, Malouda was sent off for the first time in the season for tackling Stephen Carr in a league game against Birmingham City at St Andrew's.

In a Premier League match against West Ham United, Malouda was voted Man of the Match, delivering 16 crosses, two of which were turned into goals (thus counted as assists) and scoring one. Malouda scored a brace against Portsmouth on 24 March, a match Chelsea won 5–0. On 27 March, Malouda scored two more goals against Aston Villa in the match which Chelsea won 7–1.

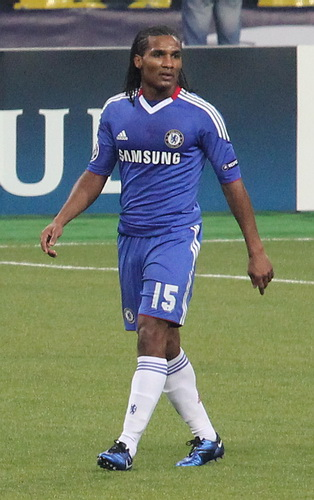
Malouda in action against Spartak Moscow in the Champions League

In Chelsea's most important fixture of the 2009–10 Premier League campaign against title rivals Manchester United, Malouda played a pivotal role in setting up the first goal of the match. By evading Antonio Valencia and Darren Fletcher en route to the penalty area, Malouda was able to deliver a low cross to Joe Cole, who redirected the ball with his back heel past goalkeeper Edwin van der Sar. Chelsea would go on to win the game 2–1.

Malouda was designated for the first time as Premier League's Player of the Month in March 2010. He scored the second goal for Chelsea in a 3–0 win over Aston Villa in the FA Cup semi-final for the second successive year on 10 April 2010. Malouda scored 12 goals and 8 assists in the league, 15 goals and 15 assists in all competitions, during the 2009–10 season. He finished joint 12th top scorer in the Premier League that season with Manchester United's Dimitar Berbatov.

==== 2010–11 ====
Malouda began the 2010–11 Premier League season for Chelsea by scoring the first goal of their Premier League campaign against West Bromwich Albion, and later getting another in a record 6–0 opening day win. He scored his third goal of the season in another 6–0 demolition of Wigan Athletic. Malouda scored his fourth goal of the season against Stoke City in a 2–0 win. He continued this prolific form against Blackpool, scoring 2 more goals to take his goal tally to six only five games into the season.

On 24 January 2011, Malouda scored in the 41st minute against Bolton Wanderers at the Reebok Stadium in a 4–0 victory for Chelsea in a game in which he completed the full 90 minutes. On 20 April 2011 he scored 2 goals in the game against Birmingham City at Stamford Bridge, starting in a 3–1 win. As of May 2011, he had scored 41 goals in 179 matches in all competitions since making his debut back in 2007. Florent is also widely known for his hairstyle changes. During the 2010–11 Premier League season he was Chelsea's top league goalscorer, with a total of 13 goals, ahead of the likes of Didier Drogba and Nicolas Anelka.

==== 2011–12 ====
During the summer of 2011, following Chelsea's signing of Spanish World Cup-winning winger Juan Mata, Italian Serie A giants Juventus's general director expressed interest in a bid for Malouda. Speaking ahead of France's European Championship qualifier against Albania, Malouda insisted that he wanted to stay at Stamford Bridge until the next World Cup at least.

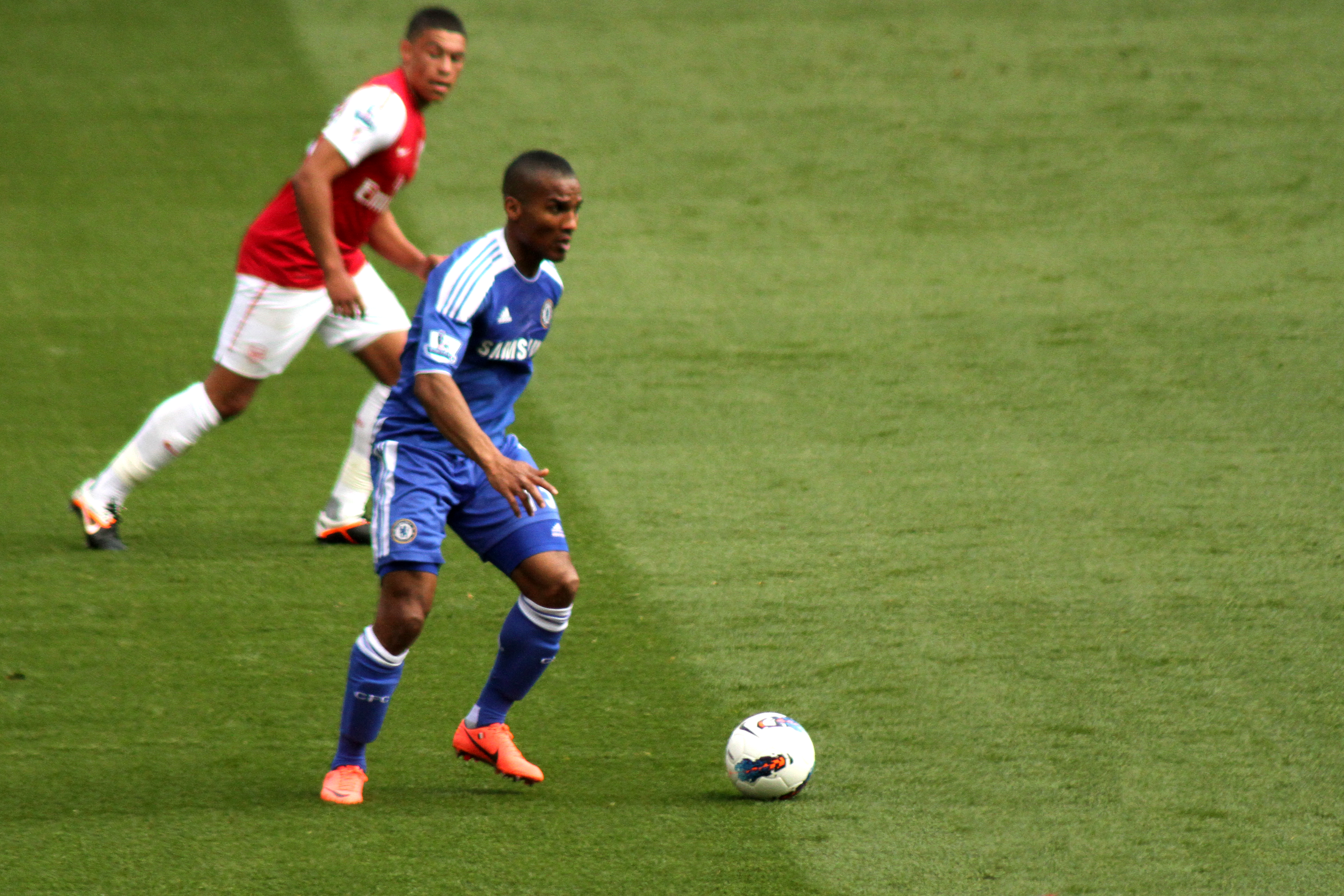
Malouda in action against Arsenal's Alex Oxlade-Chamberlain

He scored in the 5–1 demolition of Tottenham Hotspur at Wembley during the FA Cup semi-finals. Malouda came on as an injury-time substitute in Chelsea's 2–1 defeat of Liverpool in the final on 5 May, and collected his third FA Cup winners medal. He picked up a small injury in the club's last game of the Premier League season, a 2–1 defeat of relegated Blackburn Rovers which left him in doubt for the Champions League final, but passed a late fitness test and started on the bench for the Champions League final in Munich.

Maalouda came on as a second-half substitute for Ryan Bertrand in the Champions League final against Bayern Munich on 19 May at the Allianz Arena. The game was decided by spot kicks as Chelsea ran out 4–3 winners, with Malouda helping them become the first London club to win the European Cup/Champions League trophy. Following an up-and-down season where he was regularly out of the first team, Malouda pledged his loyalty to the club and promised that he would work his hardest to prove his worth again to the club and fans.

==== 2012–13 ====
Malouda missed some of Chelsea's pre-season matches as he was given extra rest following his inclusion in France's UEFA Euro 2012 squad. He was used as a second-half substitute in the pre-season matches against Paris Saint-Germain, MLS All-Stars, and Milan. Malouda requested a transfer away from Chelsea during the summer. A number of teams in Brazil, as well as his former club Lyon, all showed an interest while the window was open, but Malouda refused to take a significant wage drop from his £80,000 a week. As a result of his refusal to move, he was not picked to be a member of the Chelsea squad in any competition. He was instead ordered to train away from the regular team with the under-21 squad. On 30 June 2013, Malouda was released by Chelsea.

=== Later career ===
On 17 July 2013, it was announced that Malouda signed a two-year contract with Turkish Süper Lig side Trabzonspor. The deal was reported to be worth around €2.5 million per season. On 1 November 2013, he scored two goals against Kayseri Erciyesspor as his side won the match 3–1 in the Hüseyin Avni Aker Stadium. After having been released by Trabzonspor, on 12 September 2014, he returned to Ligue 1 after seven years abroad, signing for Metz.

On 23 August 2015, Malouda signed for Indian Super League side Delhi Dynamos, managed by Roberto Carlos. He played in all of the Dynamos 2015 Indian Super League games, as they reached the playoff semi-finals. On 29 January 2016, Malouda joined Egyptian Premier League side Wadi Degla on a six-month loan deal, allowing him to continue to play and remain fit during the Indian off-season. He played 18 times as he helped his new club the Egyptian cup quarter-finals and a fifth-placed finish in the league, narrowly missing out on qualification for the CAF Confederation Cup.

Malouda returned to the Dynamos, ready for the 2016 Indian Super League. He played the majority of the season as captain as they again reached the playoff semi-finals before leaving the club in July 2017. On 25 January 2018, after being without a club for almost half a year, Malouda signed a contract with Luxembourg National Division team FC Differdange 03 until the end of the season. Injuries restricted his playing time in Luxembourg, playing five times and assisting three goals as his team finished fifth in the league and reached the semi-finals of the Luxembourg Cup.

== International career ==
=== France ===
Malouda made his debut for France on 17 November 2004 in a match against Poland. He then became a squad regular, scoring his first goal for his country on 31 May 2005 against Hungary. After playing almost throughout France's qualifying campaign for the 2006 FIFA World Cup, Malouda earned a call up to the final squad. Malouda continued to play regularly in the tournament, where the French eventually lost on penalties to Italy in the final. He won a penalty for France in that game, which was converted by Zinedine Zidane.

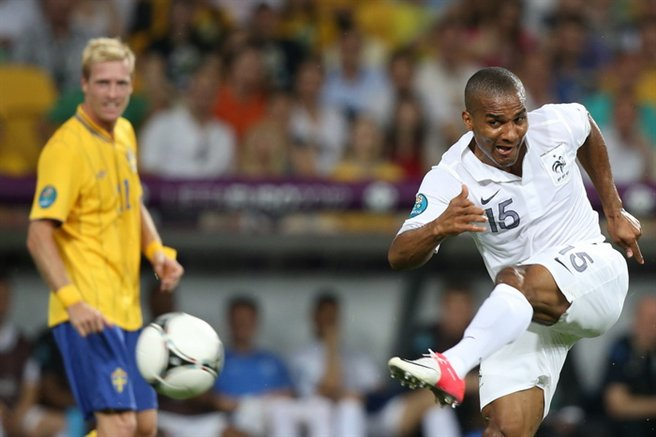
Malouda (right) playing for France at UEFA Euro 2012.

On 22 June 2010, during the 2010 World Cup, Malouda scored a goal during the match against host nation South Africa, which ended in a 2–1 defeat in favour of South Africa. It was the only goal scored by France during their campaign in the group stage before they were eliminated in last place, having drawn 0–0 with Uruguay and lost 2–0 to Mexico. On 3 September 2010, Malouda was handed the captain's armband in France's first UEFA Euro 2012 qualifier against Belarus, while a five-game suspension was being served by the previous captain, Patrice Evra. It was new coach Laurent Blanc's first game in charge and Les Bleus slumped to a disappointing 1–0 defeat.

On international duty in February 2012, Malouda netted his side's second goal of a 2–1 defeat of Germany, latching on to a cross from fellow substitute Morgan Amalfitano. After being included in France's 23-man squad for the Euro 2012 final stages in Poland and Ukraine, Malouda scored his ninth international goal in a 2–0 friendly defeat of Serbia on 31 May, netting from the edge of the area to double their advantage.

=== French Guiana ===
Malouda became available to play for his home nation, a non-FIFA association, after a five-year absence from the French squad. In June 2017, he was named to the preliminary French Guiana squad for the 2017 CONCACAF Gold Cup, and made his debut against Barbados in a friendly. He was, however, ruled ineligible for the Gold Cup since CONCACAF rules for the tournament use FIFA eligibility guidelines and Malouda remains cap-tied to France. Despite this, on 11 July 2017, Malouda was selected to start French Guiana's Gold Cup match against Honduras, resulting in a forfeit after what was originally a 0–0 draw.

== Coaching career ==
Malouda later became a coach at Swiss club FC Zurich, but his contract was cancelled in April 2019 after less than 2 months.

== Personal life ==
Malouda's son Aaron Malouda is a professional footballer with FC Basel.

== Career statistics ==
=== Club ===
Appearances and goals by club, season and competition
| Club | Season | League | | | National cup (Note: Includes Coupe de France, FA Cup, Egypt Cup, Luxembourg Cup) | | League cup (Note: Includes Coupe de la Ligue, Football League Cup) | | Continental | | Other | | Total | |
| Club | Season | Division | Apps | Goals | Apps | Goals | Apps | Goals | Apps | Goals | Apps | Goals | Apps | Goals |
|---|---|---|---|---|---|---|---|---|---|---|---|---|---|---|
| Châteauroux | 1996–97 | Division 2 | 2 | 0 | 0 | 0 | 0 | 0 | — | | — | | 2 | 0 |
| Châteauroux | 1997–98 | Division 1 | 1 | 0 | 0 | 0 | 0 | 0 | — | | — | | 1 | 0 |
| Châteauroux | 1998–99 | Division 2 | 28 | 3 | 1 | 0 | 1 | 0 | — | | — | | 30 | 3 |
| Châteauroux | 1999–2000 | Division 2 | 28 | 2 | 1 | 0 | 3 | 2 | — | | — | | 32 | 4 |
| Châteauroux | Total | | 59 | 5 | 2 | 0 | 4 | 2 | — | | — | | 65 | 7 |
| Guingamp | 2000–01 | Division 1 | 23 | 1 | 0 | 0 | 1 | 0 | — | | — | | 24 | 1 |
| Guingamp | 2001–02 | Division 1 | 32 | 4 | 2 | 0 | 2 | 1 | — | | — | | 36 | 5 |
| Guingamp | 2002–03 | Ligue 1 | 36 | 10 | 2 | 0 | 2 | 2 | — | | — | | 40 | 12 |
| Guingamp | Total | | 91 | 15 | 4 | 0 | 5 | 3 | — | | — | | 100 | 18 |
| Lyon | 2003–04 | Ligue 1 | 35 | 4 | 3 | 2 | 1 | 0 | 10 (Note: Appearances in UEFA Champions League) | 0 | 1 (Note: Appearance in Trophée des Champions) | 0 | 50 | 6 |
| Lyon | 2004–05 | Ligue 1 | 37 | 5 | 3 | 0 | 0 | 0 | 10 | 3 | 1 | 0 | 51 | 8 |
| Lyon | 2005–06 | Ligue 1 | 31 | 6 | 3 | 0 | 1 | 0 | 9 | 0 | 1 | 0 | 45 | 6 |
| Lyon | 2006–07 | Ligue 1 | 35 | 10 | 2 | 0 | 3 | 1 | 7 | 2 | 0 | 0 | 47 | 13 |
| Lyon | Total | | 138 | 25 | 11 | 2 | 5 | 1 | 36 | 5 | 3 | 0 | 193 | 33 |
| Chelsea | 2007–08 | Premier League | 21 | 2 | 2 | 0 | 3 | 0 | 11 | 1 | 1 (Note: Appearance in FA Community Shield) | 1 | 38 | 4 |
| Chelsea | 2008–09 | Premier League | 31 | 6 | 4 | 1 | 2 | 1 | 10 | 1 | — | | 47 | 9 |
| Chelsea | 2009–10 | Premier League | 33 | 12 | 6 | 2 | 3 | 1 | 8 | 0 | 1 | 0 | 51 | 15 |
| Chelsea | 2010–11 | Premier League | 38 | 13 | 2 | 0 | 0 | 0 | 9 | 1 | 1 | 0 | 50 | 14 |
| Chelsea | 2011–12 | Premier League | 26 | 2 | 5 | 1 | 3 | 0 | 9 | 0 | — | | 43 | 3 |
| Chelsea | 2012–13 | Premier League | 0 | 0 | 0 | 0 | 0 | 0 | 0 | 0 | 0 | 0 | 0 | 0 |
| Chelsea | Total | | 149 | 35 | 19 | 4 | 11 | 2 | 47 | 3 | 3 | 1 | 229 | 45 |
| Trabzonspor | 2013–14 | Süper Lig | 19 | 5 | 0 | 0 | — | | 10 (Note: Appearances in UEFA Europa League) | 2 | — | | 29 | 7 |
| Metz | 2014–15 | Ligue 1 | 28 | 3 | 1 | 0 | 2 | 0 | — | | — | | 31 | 3 |
| Delhi Dynamos | 2015 | Indian Super League | 16 | 0 | — | | — | | — | | — | | 16 | 0 |
| Delhi Dynamos | 2016 | Indian Super League | 16 | 3 | — | | — | | — | | — | | 16 | 3 |
| Delhi Dynamos | Total | | 32 | 3 | — | | — | | — | | — | | 32 | 3 |
| Wadi Degla (loan) | 2015–16 | Egyptian Premier League | 16 | 3 | 2 | 0 | — | | — | | — | | 18 | 3 |
| FC Differdange 03 | 2017–18 | Luxembourg National Division | 8 | 0 | 1 | 0 | — | | — | | — | | 9 | 0 |
| Career total | | | 540 | 94 | 40 | 6 | 27 | 8 | 93 | 10 | 6 | 1 | 706 | 119 |

=== International ===
Appearances and goals by national team and year
| National team | Year | Apps | Goals |
|---|---|---|---|
| France | 2004 | 1 | 0 |
| France | 2005 | 8 | 1 |
| France | 2006 | 16 | 2 |
| France | 2007 | 9 | 0 |
| France | 2008 | 10 | 0 |
| France | 2009 | 6 | 0 |
| France | 2010 | 12 | 2 |
| France | 2011 | 11 | 2 |
| France | 2012 | 7 | 2 |
| Total | | 80 | 9 |

Scores and results list France's goal tally first, score column indicates score after each Malouda goal.

List of international goals scored by Florent Malouda
| No. | Date | Venue | Opponent | Score | Result | Competition |
|---|---|---|---|---|---|---|
| 1 | 31 May 2005 | Stade Saint-Symphorien, Metz, France | Hungary | 2–0 | 2–1 | Friendly |
| 2 | 27 May 2006 | Stade de France, Saint-Denis, France | Mexico | 1–0 | 1–0 | Friendly |
| 3 | 2 September 2006 | Boris Paichadze Stadium, Tbilisi, Georgia | Georgia | 1–0 | 3–0 | Euro 2008 Qualification |
| 4 | 22 June 2010 | Free State Stadium, Bloemfontein, South Africa | South Africa | 1–2 | 1–2 | 2010 FIFA World Cup |
| 5 | 7 September 2010 | Asim Ferhatović Hase Stadium, Sarajevo, Bosnia and Herzegovina | Bosnia and Herzegovina | 2–0 | 2–0 | Euro 2012 Qualification |
| 6 | 3 June 2011 | Dinamo Stadium, Minsk, Belarus | Belarus | 1–1 | 1–1 | Euro 2012 Qualification |
| 7 | 7 October 2011 | Stade de France, Saint-Denis, France | Albania | 1–0 | 3–0 | Euro 2012 Qualification |
| 8 | 29 February 2012 | Weserstadion, Bremen, Germany | Germany | 2–0 | 2–1 | Friendly |
| 9 | 31 May 2012 | Stade Auguste Delaune, Reims, France | Serbia | 2–0 | 2–0 | Friendly |

== Honours ==
Lyon

- Ligue 1: 2003–04, 2004–05, 2005–06, 2006–07
- Trophée des Champions: 2003, 2004, 2005

Chelsea

- Premier League: 2009–10
- FA Cup: 2008–09, 2009–10, 2011–12
- FA Community Shield: 2009
- UEFA Champions League: 2011–12; runner-up: 2007–08

France

- FIFA World Cup runner-up: 2006

Individual

- Ligue 1 Team of the Year: 2004–05, 2005–06, 2006–07
- Ligue 1 Player of the Month: November 2006
- Ligue 1 Player of the Year: 2006–07
- Premier League Player of the Month: March 2010
- Indian Super League Hero of the League: 2016
