= 2003 Trophée des Champions =

- Event: Trophée des Champions
| Lyon | Auxerre |
| 2 | 1 |
- Date: 26 July 2003
- Venue: Stade de Gerland, Lyon, France
- Referee: Laurent Duhamel
- Attendance: 18,254

The 2003 Trophée des Champions was a football match held at Stade de Gerland, Lyon on 26 July 2003, that saw 2002–03 Ligue 1 champions Olympique Lyonnais defeat 2002–03 Coupe de France winners AJ Auxerre 2–1.

== Match details ==
26 July 2003
17:45 CET

| Lyon | 2–1 | Auxerre |
|---|---|---|
| Essien 5'; Diarra 9' | Report | Kapo 83' |

Stade de Gerland, Lyon
Attendance: 18,254
Referee: Laurent Duhamel

OLYMPIQUE LYONNAIS:
| GK | 1 | (France) Grégory Coupet |
| RB | 2 | (Belgium) Éric Deflandre |
| CB | 3 | (Brazil) Edmílson |
| CB | 20 | (Switzerland) Patrick Müller |
| LB | 12 | (France) Anthony Réveillère |
| MF | 4 | (Ghana) Michael Essien | (yellow card) 37' |
| MF | 6 | (France) Philippe Violeau (c) | | (substituted off) 65' |
| MF | 7 | (Mali) Mahamadou Diarra |
| MF | 8 | (Brazil) Juninho |
| FW | 11 | (France) Florent Malouda | | (substituted off) 65' |
| FW | 34 | (France) Julien Viale | | (substituted off) 25' |
Substitutes:
| GK | 25 | (France) Rémy Vercoutre |
| DF | 22 | (France) Romain Sartre |
| MF | 10 | (France) Eric Carrière | | (substituted on) 65' |
| MF | 24 | (France) Vikash Dhorasoo | | (substituted on) 65' |
| FW | 31 | (France) Bryan Bergougnoux | | (substituted on) 25' |
Manager:
(France) Paul Le Guen

AUXERRE:
| GK | 1 | (France) Fabien Cool |
| RB | 2 | (France) Johan Radet | (substituted off) 78' |
| CB | 4 | (France) Jean-Alain Boumsong |
| CB | 5 | (France) Philippe Mexès |
| LB | 3 | (France) Jean-Sébastien Jaurès |
| CM | 8 | (France) Yann Lachuer (c) |
| CM | 10 | (Finland) Teemu Tainio |
| CM | 18 | (France) Lionel Mathis |
| RW | 15 | (Ivory Coast) Bonaventure Kalou | (substituted off) 46' |
| LW | 11 | (Ivory Coast) Kanga Akalé | (substituted off) 70' |
| FW | 9 | (France) Djibril Cissé |
Substitutes:
| GK | 30 | (France) Baptiste Chabert |
| DF | 13 | (Switzerland) Stéphane Grichting |
| DF | 26 | (Cameroon) Jean-Joël Perrier-Doumbé | (substituted on) 78' |
| MF | 20 | (France) Arnaud Gonzalez | (substituted on) 70' |
| FW | 23 | (France) Olivier Kapo | (substituted on) 46' |
Manager:
(France) Guy Roux

MATCH OFFICIALS

- Assistant referees:
  - Philippe Bombart
  - Alain Dutheil
- Fourth official: Philippe Malige

== See also ==
- 2003–04 Ligue 1
- 2003–04 Coupe de France
- 2003–04 AJ Auxerre season
- 2003–04 Olympique Lyonnais season
