= Olympique Lyonnais in European football =

French club in European football

The following table gives detailed results of the games played by Olympique Lyonnais (Lyon), since the 1959–60 season, in European football competitions (European Cup/UEFA Champions League, UEFA Cup/UEFA Europa League, Inter-Cities Fairs Cup and UEFA Cup Winners' Cup).

== Results ==
Statistics are as of the 2026–27 season.

=== By competition ===
Information correct as of 16 September 2026.

| Competition | Pld | W | D | L | GF | GA | GD | Win% |
|---|---|---|---|---|---|---|---|---|
| Champions League | 152 | 64 | 38 | 50 | 230 | 182 | +48 | 42.11 |
| Cup Winners' Cup | 22 | 9 | 5 | 8 | 31 | 28 | +3 | 40.91 |
| Europa League | 102 | 59 | 19 | 24 | 194 | 127 | +67 | 57.84 |
| Inter-Cities Fairs Cup | 10 | 3 | 1 | 6 | 12 | 27 | −15 | 30.00 |
| Total | 268 | 132 | 55 | 81 | 448 | 335 | +113 | 49.25 |

=== List of matches ===
Note: Lyon score always listed first.

| Season | Competition | Round | Opponent | Home | Away | Agg. |
|---|---|---|---|---|---|---|
| 1959–60 | Inter-Cities Fairs Cup | R1 | (Italy) Internazionale | 1–1 | 0–7 | 1–8 |
| 1960–61 | Inter-Cities Fairs Cup | R1 | (West Germany) 1. FC Köln | 1–3 | 2–1 | 3–4 |
| 1961–62 | Inter-Cities Fairs Cup | R1 | (England) Sheffield Wednesday | 4–2 | 2–5 | 6–7 |
| 1963–64 | Cup Winners' Cup | R1 | (Denmark) B 1913 | 3–1 | 3–1 | 6–2 |
| 1963–64 | Cup Winners' Cup | R2 | (Greece) Olympiacos | 4–1 | 1–2 | 5–3 |
| 1963–64 | Cup Winners' Cup | QF | (West Germany) Hamburger SV | 2–0 | 1–1 | 3–1 |
| 1963–64 | Cup Winners' Cup | SF | (Portugal) Sporting CP | 0–0 | 1–1 | 1–1 (po 0–1) |
| 1964–65 | Cup Winners' Cup | R1 | (Portugal) Porto | 0–1 | 0–3 | 0–4 |
| 1967–68 | Cup Winners' Cup | R1 | (Luxembourg) Aris Bonnevoie | 2–1 | 3–0 | 5–1 |
| 1967–68 | Cup Winners' Cup | R2 | (England) Tottenham Hotspur | 1–0 | 3–4 | 4–4 (a) |
| 1967–68 | Cup Winners' Cup | QF | (West Germany) Hamburger SV | 2–0 | 0–2 | 2–2 (po 0–2) |
| 1968–69 | Inter-Cities Fairs Cup | R1 | (Portugal) Académica de Coimbra | 1–0 | 0–1 (a.e.t.) | 1–1 (c) |
| 1968–69 | Inter-Cities Fairs Cup | R2 | (Portugal) Vitória de Setúbal | 1–2 | 0–5 | 1–7 |
| 1973–74 | Cup Winners' Cup | R1 | (Finland) Reipas Lahti | 2–0 | 0–0 | 2–0 |
| 1973–74 | Cup Winners' Cup | R2 | (Greece) PAOK | 3–3 | 0–4 | 3–7 |
| 1974–75 | UEFA Cup | R1 | (Luxembourg) Red Boys Differdange | 7–0 | 4–1 | 11–1 |
| 1974–75 | UEFA Cup | R2 | (West Germany) Borussia Mönchengladbach | 2–5 | 0–1 | 2–6 |
| 1975–76 | UEFA Cup | R1 | (Belgium) Club Brugge | 4–3 | 0–3 | 4–6 |
| 1991–92 | UEFA Cup | R1 | (Sweden) Östers IF | 1–0 | 1–1 | 2–1 |
| 1991–92 | UEFA Cup | R2 | (Turkey) Trabzonspor | 3–4 | 1–4 | 4–8 |
| 1995–96 | UEFA Cup | R1 | (Portugal) Farense | 1–0 | 1–0 | 2–0 |
| 1995–96 | UEFA Cup | R2 | (Italy) Lazio | 2–1 | 2–0 | 4–1 |
| 1995–96 | UEFA Cup | R3 | (England) Nottingham Forest | 0–0 | 0–1 | 0–1 |
| 1997–98 | UEFA Cup | R1 | (Denmark) Brøndby | 4–1 | 3–2 | 7–3 |
| 1997–98 | UEFA Cup | R2 | (Italy) Internazionale | 1–3 | 2–1 | 3–4 |
| 1998–99 | UEFA Cup | R1 | (England) Blackburn Rovers | 2–2 | 1–0 | 3–2 |
| 1998–99 | UEFA Cup | R2 | (Federal Republic of Yugoslavia) Red Star Belgrade | 3–2 | 2–1 | 5–3 |
| 1998–99 | UEFA Cup | R3 | (Belgium) Club Brugge | 1–0 | 4–3 | 5–3 |
| 1998–99 | UEFA Cup | QF | (Italy) Bologna | 2–0 | 0–3 | 2–3 |
| 1999–2000 | Champions League | QR3 | (Slovenia) Maribor | 0–1 | 0–2 | 0–3 |
| 1999–2000 | UEFA Cup | R1 | (Finland) HJK | 5–1 | 1–0 | 6–1 |
| 1999–2000 | UEFA Cup | R2 | (Scotland) Celtic | 1–0 | 1–0 | 2–0 |
| 1999–2000 | UEFA Cup | R3 | (Germany) Werder Bremen | 3–0 | 0–4 | 3–4 |
| 2000–01 | Champions League | QR3 | (Slovakia) Inter Bratislava | 2–1 | 2–1 | 4–2 |
| 2000–01 | Champions League | GS1 | (Netherlands) Heerenveen | 3–1 | 2–0 | 2nd out of 4 |
| 2000–01 | Champions League | GS1 | (Greece) Olympiacos | 1–0 | 1–2 | 2nd out of 4 |
| 2000–01 | Champions League | GS1 | (Spain) Valencia | 1–2 | 0–1 | 2nd out of 4 |
| 2000–01 | Champions League | GS2 | (Germany) Bayern Munich | 3–0 | 0–1 | 3rd out of 4 |
| 2000–01 | Champions League | GS2 | (Russia) Spartak Moscow | 3–0 | 1–1 | 3rd out of 4 |
| 2000–01 | Champions League | GS2 | (England) Arsenal | 0–1 | 1–1 | 3rd out of 4 |
| 2001–02 | Champions League | GS1 | (Germany) Bayer Leverkusen | 0–1 | 4–2 | 3rd out of 4 |
| 2001–02 | Champions League | GS1 | (Turkey) Fenerbahçe | 3–1 | 1–0 | 3rd out of 4 |
| 2001–02 | Champions League | GS1 | (Spain) Barcelona | 2–3 | 0–2 | 3rd out of 4 |
| 2001–02 | UEFA Cup | R3 | (Belgium) Club Brugge | 3–0 | 1–4 | 4–4 (a) |
| 2001–02 | UEFA Cup | R4 | (Czech Republic) Slovan Liberec | 1–1 | 1–4 | 2–5 |
| 2002–03 | Champions League | GS1 | (Netherlands) Ajax | 0–2 | 1–2 | 3rd out of 4 |
| 2002–03 | Champions League | GS1 | (Norway) Rosenborg | 5–0 | 1–1 | 3rd out of 4 |
| 2002–03 | Champions League | GS1 | (Italy) Internazionale | 3–3 | 2–1 | 3rd out of 4 |
| 2002–03 | UEFA Cup | R3 | (Turkey) Denizlispor | 0–1 | 0–0 | 0–1 |
| 2003–04 | Champions League | GS | (Belgium) Anderlecht | 1–0 | 0–1 | 1st out of 4 |
| 2003–04 | Champions League | GS | (Scotland) Celtic | 3–2 | 0–2 | 1st out of 4 |
| 2003–04 | Champions League | GS | (Germany) Bayern Munich | 1–1 | 2–1 | 1st out of 4 |
| 2003–04 | Champions League | R16 | (Spain) Real Sociedad | 1–0 | 1–0 | 2–0 |
| 2003–04 | Champions League | QF | (Portugal) Porto | 2–2 | 0–2 | 2–4 |
| 2004–05 | Champions League | GS | (England) Manchester United | 2–2 | 1–2 | 1st out of 4 |
| 2004–05 | Champions League | GS | (Czech Republic) Sparta Prague | 5–0 | 2–1 | 1st out of 4 |
| 2004–05 | Champions League | GS | (Turkey) Fenerbahçe | 4–2 | 3–1 | 1st out of 4 |
| 2004–05 | Champions League | R16 | (Germany) Werder Bremen | 7–2 | 3–0 | 10–2 |
| 2004–05 | Champions League | QF | (Netherlands) PSV Eindhoven | 1–1 | 1–1 (a.e.t.) | 2–2 (2–4 p) |
| 2005–06 | Champions League | GS | (Spain) Real Madrid | 3–0 | 1–1 | 1st out of 4 |
| 2005–06 | Champions League | GS | (Norway) Rosenborg | 2–1 | 1–0 | 1st out of 4 |
| 2005–06 | Champions League | GS | (Greece) Olympiacos | 2–1 | 4–1 | 1st out of 4 |
| 2005–06 | Champions League | R16 | (Netherlands) PSV Eindhoven | 4–0 | 1–0 | 5–0 |
| 2005–06 | Champions League | QF | (Italy) Milan | 0–0 | 1–3 | 1–3 |
| 2006–07 | Champions League | GS | (Spain) Real Madrid | 2–0 | 2–2 | 1st out of 4 |
| 2006–07 | Champions League | GS | (Romania) Steaua București | 1–1 | 3–0 | 1st out of 4 |
| 2006–07 | Champions League | GS | (Ukraine) Dynamo Kyiv | 1–0 | 3–0 | 1st out of 4 |
| 2006–07 | Champions League | R16 | (Italy) Roma | 0–2 | 0–0 | 0–2 |
| 2007–08 | Champions League | GS | (Spain) Barcelona | 2–2 | 0–3 | 2nd out of 4 |
| 2007–08 | Champions League | GS | (Scotland) Rangers | 0–3 | 3–0 | 2nd out of 4 |
| 2007–08 | Champions League | GS | (Germany) VfB Stuttgart | 4–2 | 2–0 | 2nd out of 4 |
| 2007–08 | Champions League | R16 | (England) Manchester United | 1–1 | 0–1 | 1–2 |
| 2008–09 | Champions League | GS | (Italy) Fiorentina | 2–2 | 2–1 | 2nd out of 4 |
| 2008–09 | Champions League | GS | (Germany) Bayern Munich | 2–3 | 1–1 | 2nd out of 4 |
| 2008–09 | Champions League | GS | (Romania) Steaua București | 2–0 | 5–3 | 2nd out of 4 |
| 2008–09 | Champions League | R16 | (Spain) Barcelona | 1–1 | 2–5 | 3–6 |
| 2009–10 | Champions League | PO | (Belgium) Anderlecht | 5–1 | 3–1 | 8–2 |
| 2009–10 | Champions League | GS | (Italy) Fiorentina | 1–0 | 0–1 | 2nd out of 4 |
| 2009–10 | Champions League | GS | (Hungary) Debrecen | 4–0 | 4–0 | 2nd out of 4 |
| 2009–10 | Champions League | GS | (England) Liverpool | 1–1 | 2–1 | 2nd out of 4 |
| 2009–10 | Champions League | R16 | (Spain) Real Madrid | 1–0 | 1–1 | 2–1 |
| 2009–10 | Champions League | QF | (France) Bordeaux | 3–1 | 0–1 | 3–2 |
| 2009–10 | Champions League | SF | (Germany) Bayern Munich | 0–3 | 0–1 | 0–4 |
| 2010–11 | Champions League | GS | (Germany) Schalke 04 | 1–0 | 0–3 | 2nd out of 4 |
| 2010–11 | Champions League | GS | (Israel) Hapoel Tel Aviv | 2–2 | 3–1 | 2nd out of 4 |
| 2010–11 | Champions League | GS | (Portugal) Benfica | 2–0 | 3–4 | 2nd out of 4 |
| 2010–11 | Champions League | R16 | (Spain) Real Madrid | 1–1 | 0–3 | 1–4 |
| 2011–12 | Champions League | PO | (Russia) Rubin Kazan | 3–1 | 1–1 | 4–2 |
| 2011–12 | Champions League | GS | (Netherlands) Ajax | 0–0 | 0–0 | 2nd out of 4 |
| 2011–12 | Champions League | GS | (Croatia) Dinamo Zagreb | 2–0 | 7–1 | 2nd out of 4 |
| 2011–12 | Champions League | GS | (Spain) Real Madrid | 0–2 | 0–4 | 2nd out of 4 |
| 2011–12 | Champions League | R16 | (Cyprus) APOEL | 1–0 | 0–1 (a.e.t.) | 1–1 (3–4 p) |
| 2012–13 | Europa League | GS | (Czech Republic) Sparta Prague | 2–1 | 1–1 | 1st out of 4 |
| 2012–13 | Europa League | GS | (Israel) Ironi Kiryat Shmona | 2–0 | 4–3 | 1st out of 4 |
| 2012–13 | Europa League | GS | (Spain) Athletic Bilbao | 2–1 | 3–2 | 1st out of 4 |
| 2012–13 | Europa League | R32 | (England) Tottenham Hotspur | 1–1 | 1–2 | 2–3 |
| 2013–14 | Champions League | QR3 | (Switzerland) Grasshoppers | 1–0 | 1–0 | 2–0 |
| 2013–14 | Champions League | PO | (Spain) Real Sociedad | 0–2 | 0–2 | 0–4 |
| 2013–14 | Europa League | GS | (Spain) Real Betis | 1–0 | 0–0 | 1st out of 4 |
| 2013–14 | Europa League | GS | (Portugal) Vitória de Guimarães | 1–1 | 2–1 | 1st out of 4 |
| 2013–14 | Europa League | GS | (Croatia) Rijeka | 1–0 | 1–1 | 1st out of 4 |
| 2013–14 | Europa League | R32 | (Ukraine) Chornomorets Odesa | 1–0 | 0–0 | 1–0 |
| 2013–14 | Europa League | R16 | (Czech Republic) Viktoria Plzeň | 4–1 | 1–2 | 5–3 |
| 2013–14 | Europa League | QF | (Italy) Juventus | 0–1 | 1–2 | 1–3 |
| 2014–15 | Europa League | QR3 | (Czech Republic) Mladá Boleslav | 2–1 | 4–1 | 6–2 |
| 2014–15 | Europa League | PO | (Romania) Astra Giurgiu | 1–2 | 1–0 | 2–2 (a) |
| 2015–16 | Champions League | GS | (Belgium) Gent | 1–2 | 1–1 | 4th out of 4 |
| 2015–16 | Champions League | GS | (Spain) Valencia | 0–1 | 2–0 | 4th out of 4 |
| 2015–16 | Champions League | GS | (Russia) Zenit Saint Petersburg | 0–2 | 1–3 | 4th out of 4 |
| 2016–17 | Champions League | GS | (Croatia) Dinamo Zagreb | 3–0 | 1–0 | 3rd out of 4 |
| 2016–17 | Champions League | GS | (Spain) Sevilla | 0–0 | 0–1 | 3rd out of 4 |
| 2016–17 | Champions League | GS | (Italy) Juventus | 0–1 | 1–1 | 3rd out of 4 |
| 2016–17 | Europa League | R32 | (Netherlands) AZ | 7–1 | 4–1 | 11–2 |
| 2016–17 | Europa League | R16 | (Italy) Roma | 4–2 | 1–2 | 5–4 |
| 2016–17 | Europa League | QF | (Turkey) Beşiktaş | 2–1 | 1–2 (a.e.t.) | 3–3 (7–6 p) |
| 2016–17 | Europa League | SF | (Netherlands) Ajax | 3–1 | 1–4 | 4–5 |
| 2017–18 | Europa League | GS | (Cyprus) Apollon Limassol | 4–0 | 1–1 | 2nd out of 4 |
| 2017–18 | Europa League | GS | (Italy) Atalanta | 1–1 | 0–1 | 2nd out of 4 |
| 2017–18 | Europa League | GS | (England) Everton | 3–0 | 2–1 | 2nd out of 4 |
| 2017–18 | Europa League | R32 | (Spain) Villarreal | 3–1 | 1–0 | 4–1 |
| 2017–18 | Europa League | R16 | (Russia) CSKA Moscow | 2–3 | 1–0 | 3–3 (a) |
| 2018–19 | Champions League | GS | (England) Manchester City | 2–2 | 2–1 | 2nd out of 4 |
| 2018–19 | Champions League | GS | (Ukraine) Shakhtar Donetsk | 2–2 | 1–1 | 2nd out of 4 |
| 2018–19 | Champions League | GS | (Germany) TSG Hoffenheim | 2–2 | 3–3 | 2nd out of 4 |
| 2018–19 | Champions League | R16 | (Spain) Barcelona | 0–0 | 1–5 | 1–5 |
| 2019–20 | Champions League | GS | (Russia) Zenit Saint Petersburg | 1–1 | 0–2 | 2nd out of 4 |
| 2019–20 | Champions League | GS | (Germany) RB Leipzig | 2–2 | 2–0 | 2nd out of 4 |
| 2019–20 | Champions League | GS | (Portugal) Benfica | 3–1 | 1–2 | 2nd out of 4 |
| 2019–20 | Champions League | R16 | (Italy) Juventus | 1–0 | 1–2 | 2–2 (a) |
| 2019–20 | Champions League | QF | (England) Manchester City | 3–1 | | |
| 2019–20 | Champions League | SF | (Germany) Bayern Munich | 0–3 | | |
| 2021–22 | Europa League | GS | (Scotland) Rangers | 1–1 | 2–0 | 1st out of 4 |
| 2021–22 | Europa League | GS | (Denmark) Brøndby | 3–0 | 3–1 | 1st out of 4 |
| 2021–22 | Europa League | GS | (Czech Republic) Sparta Prague | 3–0 | 4–3 | 1st out of 4 |
| 2021–22 | Europa League | KPO | Bye | | | |
| 2021–22 | Europa League | R16 | (Portugal) Porto | 1–1 | 1–0 | 2–1 |
| 2021–22 | Europa League | QF | (England) West Ham United | 0–3 | 1–1 | 1–4 |
| 2024–25 | Europa League | LP | (Greece) Olympiacos | 2–0 | —N/a | 6th out of 36 |
| 2024–25 | Europa League | LP | (Scotland) Rangers | —N/a | 4–1 | 6th out of 36 |
| 2024–25 | Europa League | LP | (Turkey) Beşiktaş | 0–1 | —N/a | 6th out of 36 |
| 2024–25 | Europa League | LP | (Germany) TSG Hoffenheim | —N/a | 2–2 | 6th out of 36 |
| 2024–25 | Europa League | LP | (Azerbaijan) Qarabağ | —N/a | 4–1 | 6th out of 36 |
| 2024–25 | Europa League | LP | (Germany) Eintracht Frankfurt | 3–2 | —N/a | 6th out of 36 |
| 2024–25 | Europa League | LP | (Turkey) Fenerbahçe | —N/a | 0–0 | 6th out of 36 |
| 2024–25 | Europa League | LP | (Bulgaria) Ludogorets Razgrad | 1–1 | —N/a | 6th out of 36 |
| 2024–25 | Europa League | KPO | Bye | | | |
| 2024–25 | Europa League | R16 | (Romania) FCSB | 4–0 | 3–1 | 7–1 |
| 2024–25 | Europa League | QF | (England) Manchester United | 2–2 | 4–5 (a.e.t.) | 6–7 |
| 2025–26 | Europa League | LP | (Netherlands) Utrecht | —N/a | 1–0 | 1st out of 36 |
| 2025–26 | Europa League | LP | (Austria) Red Bull Salzburg | 2–0 | —N/a | 1st out of 36 |
| 2025–26 | Europa League | LP | (Switzerland) Basel | 2–0 | —N/a | 1st out of 36 |
| 2025–26 | Europa League | LP | (Spain) Real Betis | —N/a | 0–2 | 1st out of 36 |
| 2025–26 | Europa League | LP | (Israel) Maccabi Tel Aviv | —N/a | 6–0 | 1st out of 36 |
| 2025–26 | Europa League | LP | (Netherlands) Go Ahead Eagles | 2–1 | —N/a | 1st out of 36 |
| 2025–26 | Europa League | LP | (Switzerland) Young Boys | —N/a | 1–0 | 1st out of 36 |
| 2025–26 | Europa League | LP | (Greece) PAOK | 4–2 | —N/a | 1st out of 36 |
| 2025–26 | Europa League | KPO | Bye | | | |
| 2025–26 | Europa League | R16 | (Spain) Celta Vigo | 0–2 | 1–1 | 1–3 |
| 2026–27 | Champions League | QR3 | (Czech Republic) Sparta Prague | 3–0 | 1–2 | 4–2 |
| 2026–27 | Champions League | PO | (Turkey) Fenerbahçe | 1–2 | 1–1 | 2–3 |
| 2026–27 | Europa League | LP | (Belgium) Anderlecht | —N/a | 2–1 | TBD |
| 2026–27 | Europa League | LP | (England) Crystal Palace | | —N/a | TBD |
| 2026–27 | Europa League | LP | (Germany) TSG Hoffenheim | —N/a | | TBD |
| 2026–27 | Europa League | LP | (Spain) Real Sociedad | —N/a | | TBD |
| 2026–27 | Europa League | LP | (Norway) Lillestrøm | | —N/a | TBD |
| 2026–27 | Europa League | LP | (Belgium) Union Saint-Gilloise | | —N/a | TBD |
| 2026–27 | Europa League | LP | (Poland) Jagiellonia Białystok | —N/a | | TBD |
| 2026–27 | Europa League | LP | (Germany) Bayer Leverkusen | | —N/a | TBD |

- po = Play-off
- p = Penalty shoot-out
- a.e.t. = After extra time
- a = Away goals rule
- c = Coin toss
