= Ligue 1 Player of the Year =

French annual football award

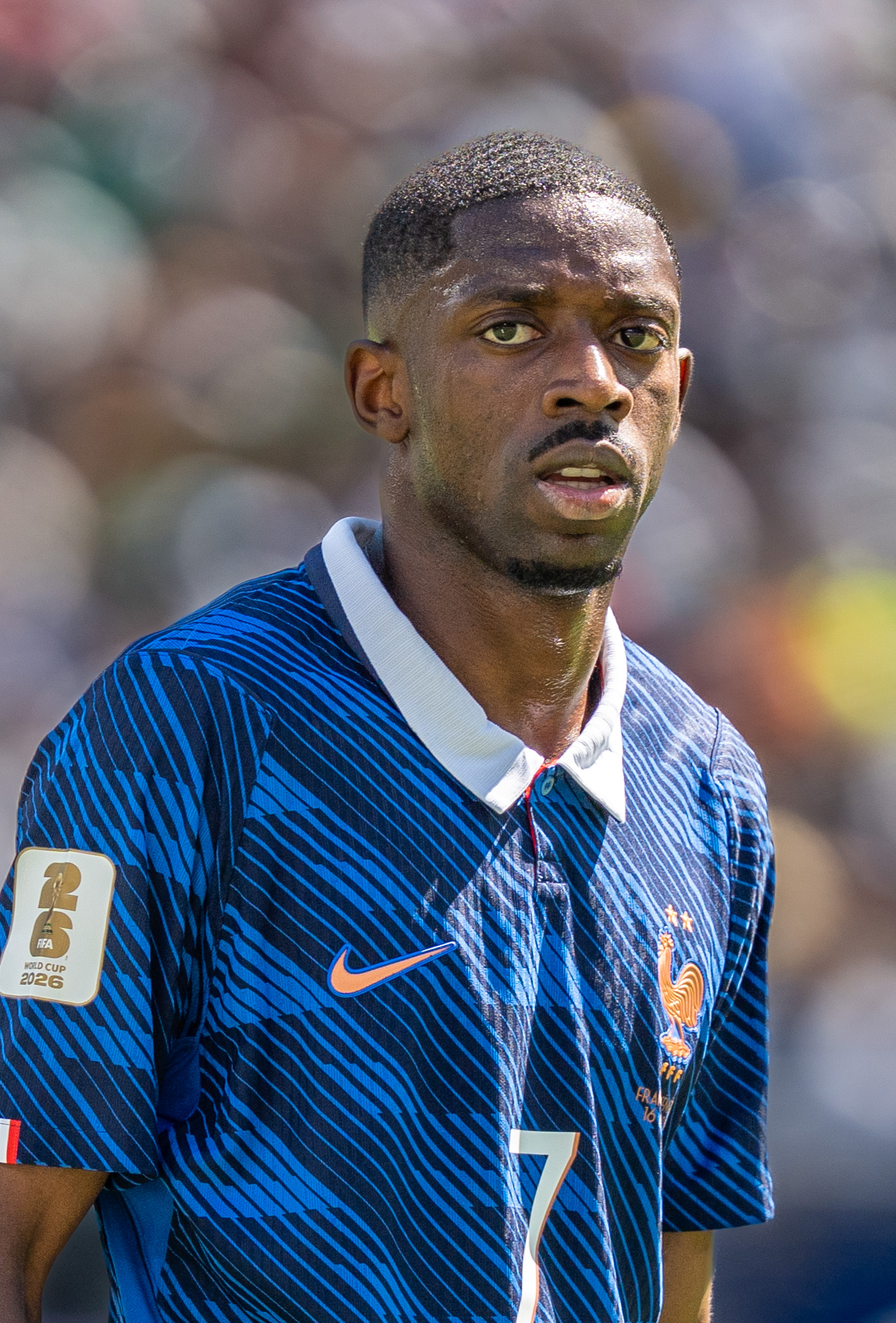
- 2026 winner Ousmane Dembélé
- Sport: Association football
- League: Ligue 1
- Awarded for: being the best performing player in a Ligue 1 season.
- Country: France
- Presented by: Union Nationale des Footballeurs Professionnels

History
- First award: 1994; 32 years ago
- Editions: 31 (as of 2025)
- First winner: (France) David Ginola
- Most wins: (France) Kylian Mbappé (5 awards)
- Most recent: (France) Ousmane Dembélé (2025–26)

The UNFP Ligue 1 Player of the Year is an official award given by the Union Nationale des Footballeurs Professionnels (UNFP) to the Ligue 1 player whose performances are considered to be the best of the season. The award has been presented since the 1993–94 season and the first winner was Paris Saint-Germain winger David Ginola. The record winner is Kylian Mbappé, who won five consecutive awards from 2019 to 2024, also as a member of Paris Saint-Germain.

The most recent winner is Paris Saint-Germain forward Ousmane Dembélé, who won his second award in the 2025–26 season.

== Key ==
- Player (X) denotes the number of times a player has won the award (if more than one)
- § Clubs with this background and symbol were Ligue 1 champions in the same season

== Winners ==
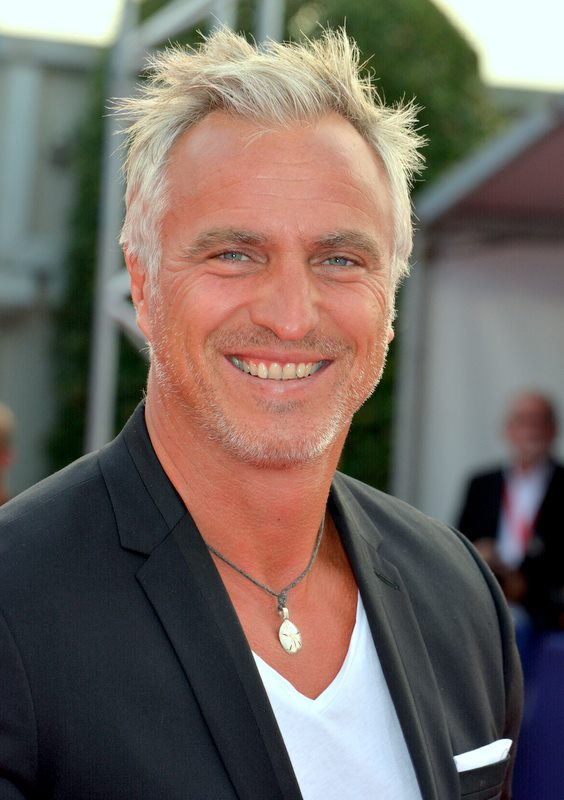
David Ginola won the inaugural award in 1994.

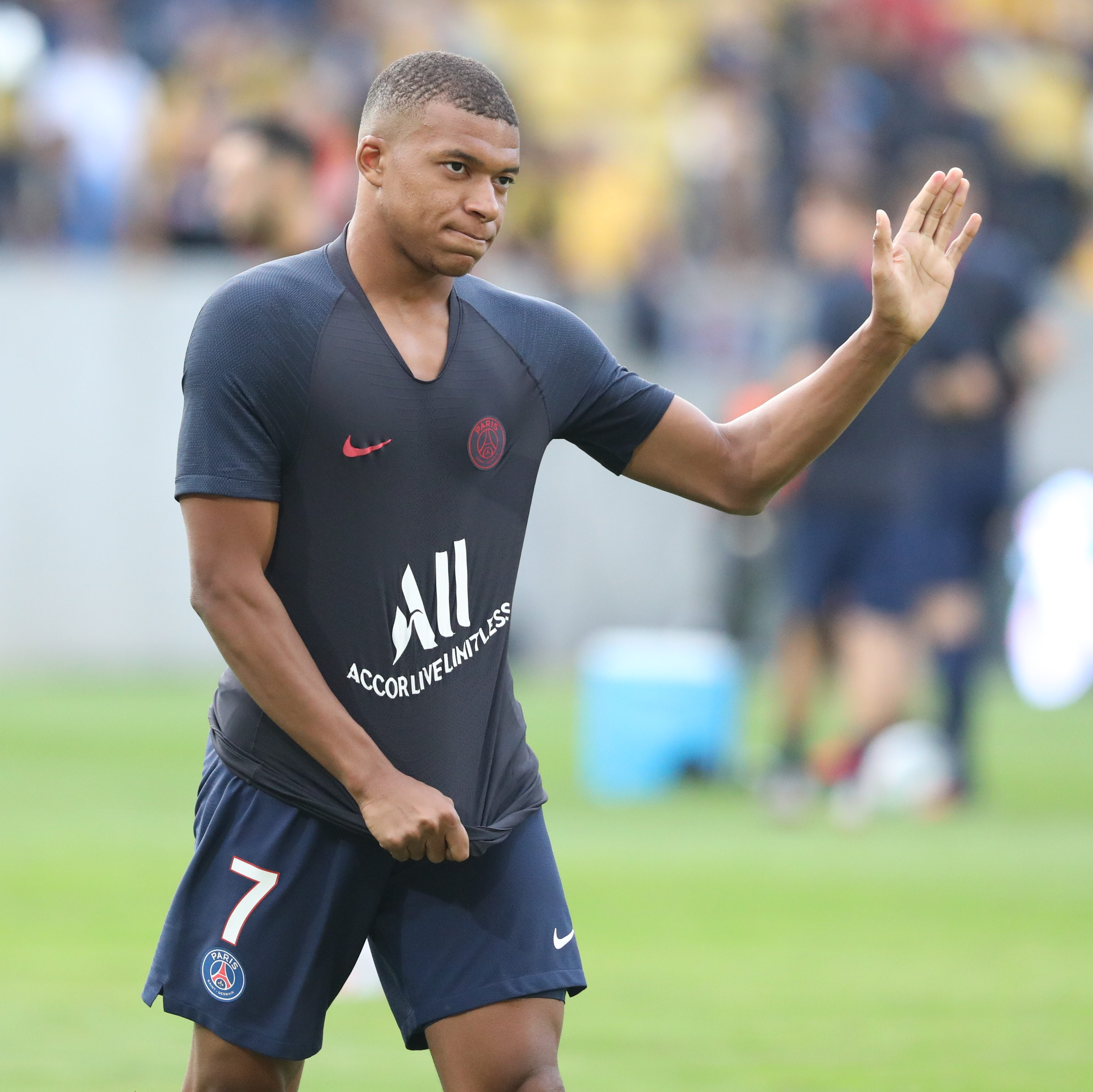
Kylian Mbappé has the most wins by a single player in the history of the awards, with five.

Season	Player	Position	Nationality	Club	Ref.
1993–94	David Ginola	Forward	France	Paris Saint-Germain^{§}	
1994–95	Vincent Guérin	Midfielder	France	Paris Saint-Germain	
1995–96	Zinedine Zidane	Midfielder	France	Bordeaux	
1996–97	Sonny Anderson	Forward	Brazil	Monaco^{§}	
1997–98	Marco Simone	Forward	Italy	Paris Saint-Germain	
1998–99	Ali Benarbia	Midfielder	Algeria	Bordeaux^{§}	
1999–2000	Marcelo Gallardo	Midfielder	Argentina	Monaco^{§}	
2000–01	Eric Carrière	Midfielder	France	Nantes^{§}	
2001–02	Pauleta	Forward	Portugal	Bordeaux	
2002–03	Pauleta (2)	Forward	Portugal	Bordeaux	
2003–04	Didier Drogba	Forward	Ivory Coast	Marseille	
2004–05	Michael Essien	Midfielder	Ghana	Lyon^{§}	
2005–06	Juninho	Midfielder	Brazil	Lyon^{§}	
2006–07	Florent Malouda	Midfielder	France	Lyon^{§}	
2007–08	Karim Benzema	Forward	France	Lyon^{§}	
2008–09	Yoann Gourcuff	Midfielder	France	Bordeaux^{§}	
2009–10	Lisandro López	Forward	Argentina	Lyon	
2010–11	Eden Hazard	Midfielder	Belgium	Lille^{§}	
2011–12	Eden Hazard (2)	Midfielder	Belgium	Lille	
2012–13	Zlatan Ibrahimović	Forward	Sweden	Paris Saint-Germain^{§}	
2013–14	Zlatan Ibrahimović (2)	Forward	Sweden	Paris Saint-Germain^{§}	
2014–15	Alexandre Lacazette	Forward	France	Lyon	
2015–16	Zlatan Ibrahimović (3)	Forward	Sweden	Paris Saint-Germain^{§}	
2016–17	Edinson Cavani	Forward	Uruguay	Paris Saint-Germain	
2017–18	Neymar	Forward	Brazil	Paris Saint-Germain^{§}	
2018–19	Kylian Mbappé	Forward	France	Paris Saint-Germain^{§}	
2019–20	Not awarded due to COVID-19 pandemic				
2020–21	Kylian Mbappé (2)	Forward	France	Paris Saint-Germain	
2021–22	Kylian Mbappé (3)	Forward	France	Paris Saint-Germain^{§}	
2022–23	Kylian Mbappé (4)	Forward	France	Paris Saint-Germain^{§}	
2023–24	Kylian Mbappé (5)	Forward	France	Paris Saint-Germain^{§}	
2024–25	Ousmane Dembélé	Forward	France	Paris Saint-Germain^{§}	
2025–26	Ousmane Dembélé (2)	Forward	France	Paris Saint-Germain^{§}	

== Breakdown of winners ==
=== By country ===
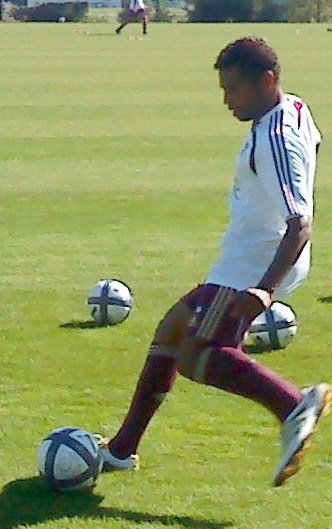
Sonny Anderson was the first winner from outside of France.

Country	Wins	Winning seasons
France	15	1993–94, 1994–95, 1995–96, 2000–01, 2006–07, 2007–08, 2008–09, 2014–15, 2018–19, 2020–21, 2021–22, 2022–23, 2023–24, 2024–25, 2025–26
Brazil	3	1996–97, 2005–06, 2017–18
Sweden	3	2012–13, 2013–14, 2015–16
Belgium	2	2010–11, 2011–12
Portugal	2	2001–02, 2002–03
Argentina	2	1999–2000, 2009–10
Ivory Coast	1	2004–05
Ghana	1	2005–06
Italy	1	1997–98
Algeria	1	1998–99
Uruguay	1	2016–17

=== By club ===
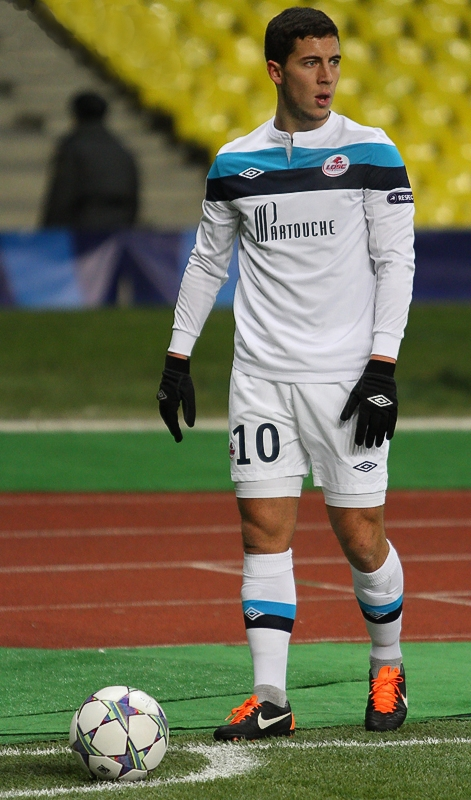
Eden Hazard won the award twice in two consecutive seasons playing for Lille.

Club	Wins	Winning seasons
Paris Saint-Germain	15	1993–94, 1994–95, 1997–98, 2012–13, 2013–14, 2015–16, 2016–17, 2017–18, 2018–19, 2020–21, 2021–22, 2022–23, 2023–24, 2024–25, 2025–26
Lyon	6	2004–05, 2005–06, 2006–07, 2007–08, 2009–10, 2014–15,
Bordeaux	5	1995–96, 1998–99, 2001–02, 2002–03, 2008–09
Monaco	2	1996–97, 1999–2000
Lille	2	2010–11, 2011–12
Marseille	1	2003–04
Nantes	1	2000–01

== See also ==
- French Player of the Year
- Trophées UNFP du football
