= 2005 Trophée des Champions =

- Event: Trophée des Champions
Auxerre	Lyon
1	4
- Date: 27 July 2005
- Venue: Stade de l'Abbé-Deschamps, Auxerre, France
- Referee: Pascal Viléo
- Attendance: 10,967

The 2005 Trophée des Champions was a football match held at Stade de l'Abbé-Deschamps, Auxerre on 27 July 2005, that saw 2004–05 Ligue 1 champions Olympique Lyonnais defeat 2004–05 Coupe de France winners AJ Auxerre 4–1.

== Match details ==
27 July 2005
20:00 CET

Auxerre	1–4	Lyon
Mathis 8'	Report	Ben Arfa 1' (pen.); Carew 33', 67', 72'

Stade de l'Abbé-Deschamps, Auxerre
Attendance: 10,967
Referee: Pascal Viléo

AUXERRE:
GK	1	(France) Fabien Cool
RB	2	(France) Johan Radet	(substituted off) 62'
CB	12	(France) Jean-Pascal Mignot
CB	34	(France) Baptiste Martin	(substituted off) 74'
LB	3	(France) Jean-Sébastien Jaurès
RM	10	(Denmark) Thomas Kahlenberg
CM	6	(France) Philippe Violeau (c)
CM	18	(France) Lionel Mathis	(substituted off) 62'
LM	7	(France) Benoît Cheyrou
FW	9	(Belgium) Luigi Pieroni
FW	28	(France) Romain Poyet
Substitutes:
GK	30	(France) Baptiste Chabert
DF	5	(Czech Republic) René Bolf		(substituted on) 74'
DF	29	(France) Bacary Sagna		(substituted on) 62'
MF	11	(Ivory Coast) Kanga Akalé		(substituted on) 62'
FW	31	(France) Kevin Lejeune
Manager:
(France) Jacques Santini

OLYMPIQUE LYONNAIS:
GK	1	(France) Grégory Coupet
RB	15	(Senegal) Lamine Diatta
CB	5	(Brazil) Caçapa
CB	24	(France) Sylvain Monsoreau
LB	23	(France) Jérémy Berthod
RM	14	(France) Sidney Govou (c)	(substituted off) 52'
CM	6	(France) Jérémy Clément
CM	26	(France) Benoît Pedretti	(substituted off) 60'
LM	18	(France) Hatem Ben Arfa
FW	9	(Norway) John Carew	(substituted off) 72'
FW	13	(France) Pierre-Alain Frau
Substitutes:
GK	30	(France) Rémy Vercoutre
DF	3	(Brazil) Cris
MF	7	(Mali) Mahamadou Diarra		(substituted on) 60'
MF	10	(France) Florent Malouda		(substituted on) 52'
FW	11	(Brazil) Nilmar		(substituted on) 72'
Manager:
(France) Gérard Houllier

MATCH OFFICIALS

- Assistant referees:
  - Bruno Faye
  - Jean-Paul Harribey

== See also ==
- 2005–06 Ligue 1
- 2005–06 Coupe de France
- 2005–06 Olympique Lyonnais season
