= Julien Viale =

French footballer (born 1982)

Personal information
- Date of birth: 13 February 1982 (age 44)
- Place of birth: Lyon, France
- Height: 1.80 m (5 ft 11 in)
- Position: Striker

Senior career*
Years	Team	Apps	(Gls)
2003–2005	Lyon	14	(1)
2004–2005	→ Reims (loan)	17	(1)
2005–2007	Istres	47	(15)
2007–2008	Brest	12	(1)
2008–2011	Ajaccio	67	(13)
2011–2013	Laval	71	(21)
2013–2015	Auxerre	47	(6)
2015–2017	Laval	24	(2)
- * Club domestic league appearances and goals

Julien Viale (born 13 February 1982) is a French former professional footballer who played as a striker.

== Honours ==
- Ligue 1: 2003–04
- Trophée des Champions: 2003, 2004
