= Philippe Violeau =

French footballer (born 1970)

Personal information
- Date of birth: 19 September 1970 (age 56)
- Place of birth: Niort, France
- Height: 1.78 m (5 ft 10 in)
- Position: Defensive midfielder

Senior career*
Years	Team	Apps	(Gls)
1988–1993	Chamois Niortais	101	(6)
1993–1997	Auxerre	78	(0)
1997–2003	Lyon	185	(11)
2003–2006	Auxerre	97	(3)
Total		461	(20)
- * Club domestic league appearances and goals

Philippe Violeau (born 19 September 1970) is a French former professional footballer who played as a defensive midfielder. He played exclusively in France, where he won both the national championship and the Coupe de France three times, as well as the Trophée des Champions twice and the Coupe de la Ligue once.

He was president of amateur side La Roche VF from February 2019 until June 2020.

== Playing career ==
Violeau was born in Niort, Deux-Sèvres. He started playing in the 1988–89 season, with his hometown club Chamois Niortais in the French second division. In 1993, Violeau moved to top-league Auxerre, where he won the 1995–96 French Division 1, and in 1997, he was transferred to Lyon where he played for six seasons. In 2003, Violeau returned to Auxerre, where he retired after the 2005–06 season. (Note: Philippe Violeau – French league stats at LFP – also available in French (archived))

== Post-playing career ==
In February 2019, Violeau was announced as president of La Roche VF, an amateur side from his home region. He stood down after sixteen months in the position, in June 2020.

== Honours ==
Auxerre

- Division 1: 1995–96
- Coupe de France: 1995–96, 2004–05

Lyon

- Division 1, Ligue 1: 2001–02, 2002–03
- Coupe de la Ligue: 2000–01
- Trophée des Champions: 2002, 2003
- UEFA Intertoto Cup: 1997
