= Juninho Pernambucano =

Brazilian footballer and sporting director (born 1975)

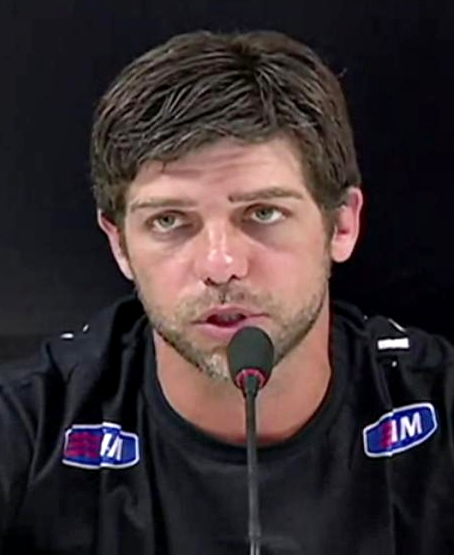
- Juninho in 2014

Personal information
- Full name: Antônio Augusto Ribeiro Reis Júnior
- Date of birth: 30 January 1975 (age 51)
- Place of birth: Recife, Brazil
- Height: 1.78 m (5 ft 10 in)
- Position: Attacking midfielder

Youth career
- 1991–1992: Sport Recife

Senior career*
Years	Team	Apps	(Gls)
1993–1995	Sport Recife	24	(3)
1995–2001	Vasco da Gama	121	(27)
2001–2009	Lyon	248	(75)
2009–2011	Al-Gharafa	40	(15)
2011–2012	Vasco da Gama	50	(11)
2013	New York Red Bulls	13	(0)
2013	Vasco da Gama	21	(2)
Total		517	(133)

International career
1999–2006	Brazil	40	(6)
Medal record
Men's football
Representing Brazil
FIFA Confederations Cup
Winner	2005 Germany
- * Club domestic league appearances and goals

Antônio Augusto Ribeiro Reis Júnior (born 30 January 1975), commonly known as Juninho Pernambucano or simply Juninho, (Note: His nickname comes from a combination of the Brazilian diminutive "Juninho", which is commonly applied to any person with the name "Junior", and "Pernambucano", meaning someone born in the north-eastern Brazilian state of Pernambuco.) is a Brazilian former professional footballer who was most recently the sporting director of Ligue 1 club Lyon. A dead-ball specialist noted for his bending free kicks, in particular the knuckleball technique which he developed, Juninho has scored the most goals from free kicks (77) and is considered by many to be the greatest free-kick taker of all time.

Juninho began his professional career in 1993 with Brazilian club Sport Recife. Two years later, he joined Vasco da Gama where he played over 100 matches and won six titles. In 2001, he joined Division 1 side Lyon where he played for the next eight years, winning seven consecutive league titles and scoring 100 goals in 343 official appearances for the club. Following his departure from Lyon in 2009, Juninho played in Qatar with Al-Gharafa and in the United States with New York Red Bulls. The latter stint was wedged between two spells back at Vasco, where he ultimately retired in 2013.

Having made his international debut in 1999, Juninho played 40 games for the Brazil national team and scored six goals. He represented Brazil at the 2001 Copa América and was part of the squad which won the 2005 FIFA Confederations Cup before retiring from international football after the 2006 World Cup. From 2013 to 2018, Juninho was a football commentator for Brazilian sports network Rede Globo.

== Club career ==
=== Sport Recife ===
Born in Recife, Juninho started his professional career at Sport Recife and quickly established himself as a rising star in Brazilian football. He won two regional titles with the club. According to Juninho, it was as a 13-year-old that he started to take free-kicks and began to develop his knuckleball technique, telling FourFourTwo magazine: “I started by copying free-kicks taken by Marcelinho, who played for Corinthians. He was one of my inspirations, and the first player I had ever seen hit the ball head on and make it dance in the air. Didi, who won the World Cup with Brazil in 1958 and 1962, was doing it back then, too. Everyone since has just been tweaking the formula.” It was when he got to France that Juninho says he mastered it.

=== Vasco da Gama ===
Juninho Pernambucano joined Vasco da Gama in 1995. He won several trophies during his first stint with the club, including the Brazilian Championship in 1997 and 2000, the Copa Libertadores in 1998, the Copa Mercosur in 2000, as well as the 2000 Brazilian Silver Ball award as one of the best Brazilian midfielders of the season. At that time, he was playing with Romário, Edmundo, and Juninho Paulista, and he became a favourite of the Vasco fans. Since that time he has been known as Reizinho de São Januário (The Little King of São Januário), a reference to Vasco da Gama's stadium, as well as Reizinho da Colina (The Little King of the Hill).

In 2001, the player won a preliminary injunction against Vasco da Gama, after which he became a free agent. Although he left Vasco for Lyon after a judicial fight, he is still considered a favourite of Vasco fans. Juninho has been cited in a classic chorus sung by the fans remembering his free-kick goal against River Plate at River Plate Stadium, during the 1998 Libertadores which helped the club reach the finals against Barcelona de Guayaquil, which they won. Juninho played 295 games for Vasco from 1995 to 2001.

=== Lyon ===
In 2001, Juninho moved abroad to play for French club Lyon. Before his arrival at Lyon, the club had never won the French championship. Starting out in his first season at the club, Lyon won seven league titles in a row. At Lyon, Juninho made himself especially noted for his accurate, powerful and varied set pieces. As well as often being ranked the world's greatest free kick exponent, Juninho was a noted passer, providing many assists, and his leadership abilities prompted Lyon manager Gérard Houllier to name him team captain.

Juninho Pernambucano scored 100 goals while at Lyon. Forty-four of those goals were scored from free-kicks, the last of which was a strike from long distance against Marseille. He scored his 100th goal on his last game for Lyon, through a penalty kick against Caen. Juninho was also a prolific goalscorer in the Champions League, and he matched Sonny Anderson as the club's top goalscorer in European competitions with 16 goals, in a match against Steaua Bucharest in November 2008. He later became Lyon's top goalscorer in the Champions League with 18 goals, while reaching three quarter-finals in the competition.

On 26 May 2009, Lyon chairman Jean-Michel Aulas announced in a press conference that the club had accepted Juninho's request to leave Lyon at the end of the season as a free agent, despite the fact that the player still had a year left in his contract. During the press conference, Juninho sat next to Aulas and left without saying a word.

=== Al-Gharafa ===
On 17 June 2009, Juninho signed a €2.5 million, two-year contract with Qatari club Al-Gharafa. In his first season with the club, Juninho captained the team to their seventh league title and wins in the Qatari Stars Cup and Qatar Crown Prince Cup, completing the treble. He finished the season with Player of the Year honours from the Qatar Football Association. Juninho played 66 games for Al-Gharafa and scored 25 goals.

=== Return to Vasco da Gama ===
On 27 April 2011, Juninho rejoined his former club Vasco da Gama. He scored his first goal for them in his first game back, via a freekick against Corinthians. He scored another two free kicks and a penalty during the course of the Brazilian top flight season. On 28 March 2012, he played and scored a goal for a 4–1 lead in Edmundo's farewell game against Barcelona Sporting Club. Vasco went on to win this game 9–1. Juninho then scored a trademark free kick against Esporte Clube Bahia in the fourth round of the Campeonato Brasileiro; that goal was to be his 16th since returning to Vasco from Al-Gharafa.

In July 2012, Juninho extended his contract with Vasco for 6 months. On 18 July 2012, he made his 350th appearance for the club against São Paulo. In August 2012, he played against his youth team Sport Recife and scored a free kick goal, which was his fourth goal from free kicks in Campeonato Brasileiro Série A 2012.

=== New York Red Bulls ===
On 17 December 2012, Juninho signed for Major League Soccer team New York Red Bulls. He made his first appearance for the team on a friendly match against Malmö, in which he was a starter. On 3 March 2013, Juninho made his official debut for the Red Bulls, playing the full time in a 3–3 draw against the Portland Timbers. On 17 April, during a 1-0 defeat while playing Sporting Kansas City, Juninho toe-poked the ball at opposition goalkeeper Jimmy Nielsen as he was time wasting and received a straight red card and suspended for two matches. On 3 July, the club announced that they reached an agreement with Juninho for the cancelation of his contract. The midfielder featured in 13 games for the New York Red Bulls, providing the team with four assists.

=== Third stint with Vasco da Gama and retirement ===
On 11 July 2013, Vasco da Gama announced Juninho's return to the club. The player scored and assisted in his third debut for Vasco, in a 3–1 victory against rivals Fluminense. He scored his first home goal of the season against Criciúma with a 32-metre free kick, also assisting Edmílson for the third goal of the game. He played his third game for Vasco da Gama against another rival team Botafogo, setting up Andre for Vasco's first goal, in a 3–2 defeat. He played his sixth game against Grêmio and made another assist. It was his fourth assist in Campeonato Brasileiro. Juninho made his fifth assist against Corinthians; the game ended in a 1–1 draw. He played his 16th game against Vasco rivals Botafogo and made two assists; the game ended with a 2–2 draw after Botafogo had led 2–0. Juninho played 16 games for Vasco in his third stint with the club, scoring two goals and making seven assists in the Campeonato Brasileiro.

He retired from playing professional football on 2 February 2014. During his years at Vasco da Gama, Juninho won six titles: the Brazilian Championship in 1997 and 2000, the Campeonato Carioca in 1998, the Rio-São Paulo Tournament in 1999, the Copa Libertadores in 1998, and the Copa Mercosur in 2000. He played in 393 games in total for the club, scoring 76 goals.

Following his retirement, Juninho worked as a football commentator for Brazilian sports network Rede Globo, a stint that ended up in 2018.

== International career ==
On 7 September 1999, Juninho played two top-level matches in two different countries in the same day. He represented his country in the second half of the friendly match between Brazil and Argentina in Porto Alegre, which Brazil won 4–2, playing about fifteen minutes. In spite of a delayed flight to Montevideo, he managed to arrive in Uruguay in time to feature in the second half of the Copa Mercosur match between Vasco and Nacional. He took part at the 2001 Copa América with Brazil.

Although Juninho had a period of prolonged domestic success during the 2000s, that contributed to him being considered one of the best Brazilian players in the world at the time, he was not selected for the Brazilian squad that featured at the 2002 FIFA World Cup and the 2004 Copa América, missing both because of a recurring knee injury. Brazil would win both tournaments. He was however a member of the Brazil squad that won the 2005 FIFA Confederations Cup, scoring a free kick against Euro 2004 champions Greece.

In the 2006 FIFA World Cup, Juninho scored a knuckleball goal in open play against Japan in a group stage match. Following Brazil's defeat to eventual runners-up France in the quarter-finals of the tournament, he announced his international retirement, so as to make way for younger talents coming through the ranks in Brazil, in order to build for the 2010 FIFA World Cup.

== Director career ==
In May 2019, Juninho was appointed as the director of football of his former club Lyon. His first decision was to name former Brazilian international teammate Sylvinho as the head coach of the French Ligue 1 team.

== Style of play ==
"Say Juninho Pernambucano's name, and the first response is likely to be, "Great free kicks." He was the greatest and most versatile free-kick taker there has ever been. Through his early years at Vasco da Gama and his eight-year stint at Lyon, Juninho developed his knuckleball technique. Whether 20, 30 or 40 yards from goal, the hits were often so pure, of such quality and ferocity, that goalkeepers simply couldn't do anything about them."

— Alex Richards in Bleacher Report ranking Juninho the greatest free-kick exponent of all time.

Juninho has been described as "one of the world's most feared strikers of a static ball". Frequently ranked the greatest free-kick exponent, the method he used for long-range free kicks is "knuckle balling", where the ball has almost no spinning motion during flight. A successful knuckle ball will "move" or "wobble" in the air unpredictably, veering in a number of different directions (making it difficult to save) before finding the net. He first made his name as a free kick taker with a long range strike against Bayern Munich in the 2003–04 Champions League group stage in which the ball dipped viciously at the end of travel that deceived Bayern keeper Oliver Kahn, who was considered one of the best goalkeepers in the world at the time.

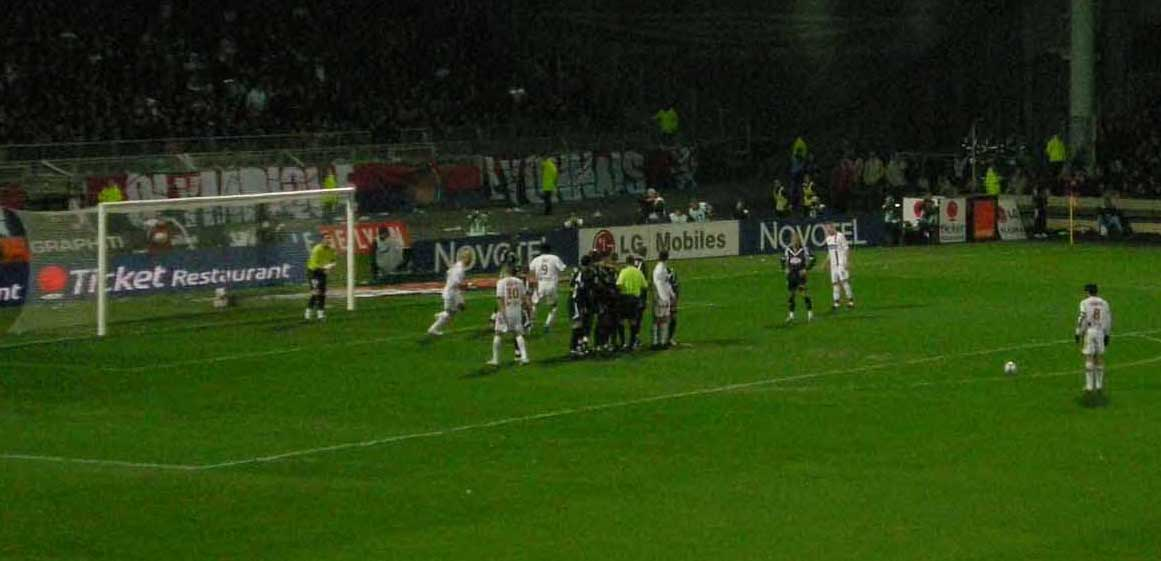
Juninho lining up to take a free kick for Lyon in 2009

Juninho has scored from free-kicks beyond 40 yards on a number of occasions: including against Ajaccio in 2006, against Barcelona in 2007, against Nice in 2008, and a strike against Marseille in 2009—his final free kick goal for Lyon. Even before Lyon, he displayed his talent at Vasco da Gama, scoring several free kick goals for the club. Juninho has also scored memorable goals for Brazil, the most famous being a curling freekick from 30 yards against Greece in the 2005 FIFA Confederations Cup. Brazil would go on to win the match 3–0. At the 2006 World Cup, during a group stage match against Japan, he scored a long-range knuckleball from open play. Brazil won the match 4-1. Juninho's free-kick style has been adapted by several other players, such as Andrea Pirlo, Cristiano Ronaldo, Didier Drogba, and Gareth Bale. The knuckle ball free-kick technique takes a significant amount of skill to replicate and strike accurately. In total, Juninho scored 72 goals from direct free kicks throughout his professional football career, which spanned from 1993 to 2013.

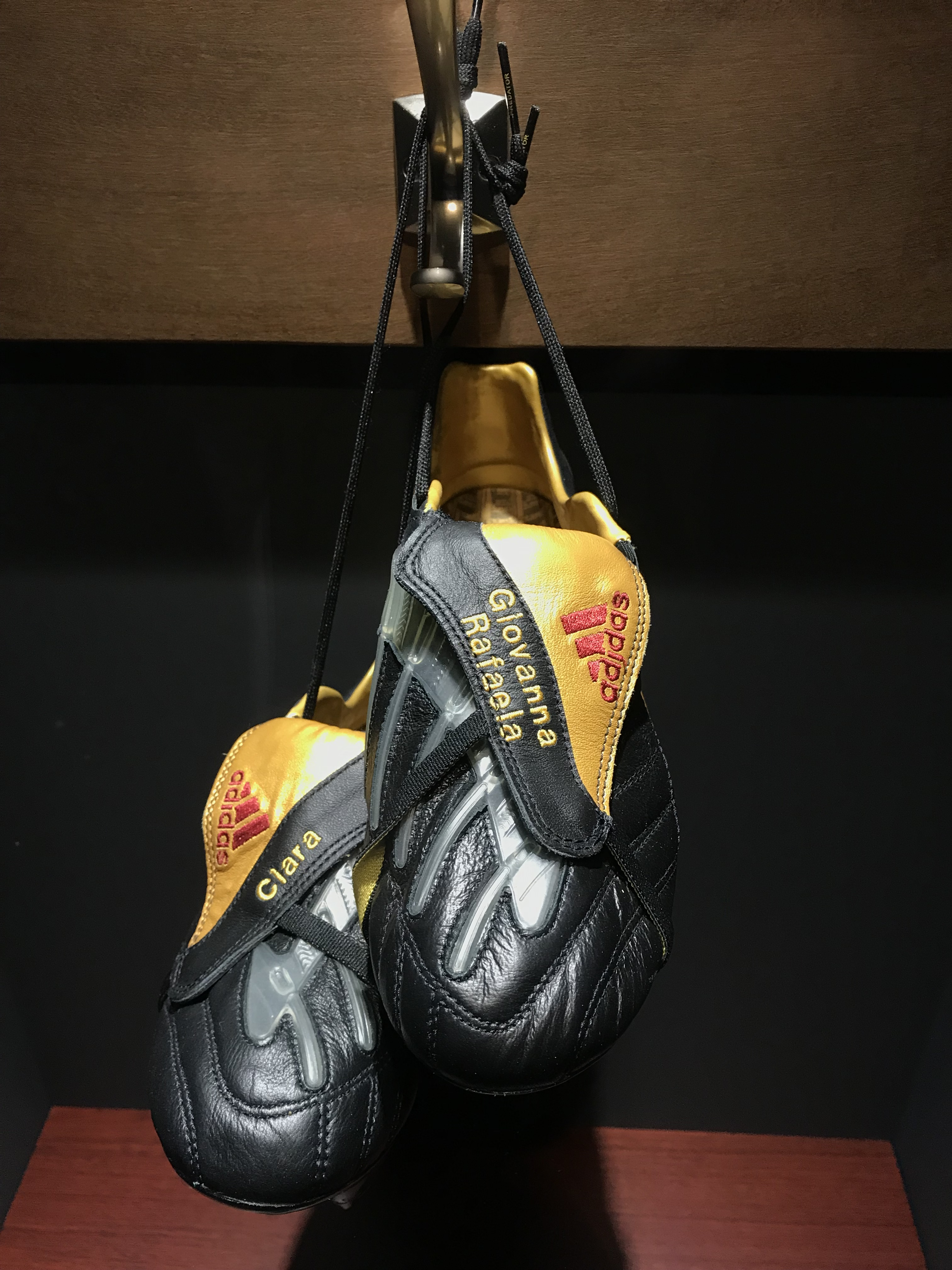
Juninho's Adidas boots in the Lyon museum

Much like King Arthur had Excalibur and William Tell his crossbow, the folk hero Juninho possessed his own special weapon to save the day — his legendary free-kicks. No one hit a free-kick quite like Juninho. No one.

— Carl Anka of the BBC.

Juninho is known for his skill as an offensive playmaker, and for his ability to produce effective passes, which led him to getting assists on many of his teammates' goals throughout his career. He has received praise for his technical ability, intelligence, vision and passing range. As well as this, he was noted for his leadership, tenacity, work-rate, and composure under pressure while club captain at Lyon and Al-Gharafa. He usually played as an attacking midfielder, he was capable of playing as a winger or as a central midfielder.

== Personal life ==
Juninho is one of the few footballers to publicly speak out against racism in the country, as well as criticize Jair Bolsonaro, the far-right former president of Brazil from 2019 to 2023. He is a father and a grandfather.

== Career statistics ==
=== Club ===
Appearances and goals by club, season and competition
Club	Season	League			National cup (Note: Includes appearances in Copa do Brasil, Coupe de France and Emir of Qatar Cup)		League cup		Continental		State league		Other		Total	
Club	Season	Division	Apps	Goals	Apps	Goals	Apps	Goals	Apps	Goals	Apps	Goals	Apps	Goals	Apps	Goals
Sport Recife	1993	Série A	2	0	—		—		—		—		—		2	0
Sport Recife	1994	Série A	22	3	—		—		—		—		1 (Note: Appearance in Copa do Nordeste)	2	23	5
Sport Recife	1995	Série A	—		2	0	—		—		—		—		2	0
Sport Recife	Total		24	3	2	0	—		—		—		1	2	27	5
Vasco da Gama	1995	Série A	21	3	—		—		—		—		—		21	3
Vasco da Gama	1996	Série A	15	7	2	0	—		3 (Note: Appearances in Copa CONMEBOL)	0	21	3	6 (Note: Appearances in Taça Cidade Maravilhosa)	1	47	11
Vasco da Gama	1997	Série A	18	4	3	1	—		6 (Note: Appearances in Supercopa Libertadores)	1	21	1	2 (Note: Appearances in Torneio Rio – São Paulo)	1	50	8
Vasco da Gama	1998	Série A	18	3	4	0	—		7 (Note: Appearances in Copa Libertadores)	1	5	1	2 (Note: One appearance and one goal in Intercontinental Cup, one appearance in Copa Interamericana)	1	36	6
Vasco da Gama	1999	Série A	20	2	4	0	—		6 (Note: Two appearances in Copa Libertadores, four appearances and one goal in Copa Mercosur)	1	12	4	10 (Note: Nine appearances and four goals in Torneio Rio – São Paulo, one appearance in Seletiva para a Libertadores)	4	52	11
Vasco da Gama	2000	Série A	28	7	1	0	—		12 (Note: Appearances in Copa Mercosur)	2	8	2	12 (Note: Four appearances in FIFA Club World Cup, eight appearances in Torneio Rio – São Paulo)	0	61	11
Vasco da Gama	2001	Série A	1	1	—		—		—		—		—		1	1
Vasco da Gama	Total		121	27	14	1	—		34	5	67	11	32	7	268	51
Lyon	2001–02	Ligue 1	29	5	2	0	2	0	8 (Note: Four appearances in UEFA Champions League, four appearances in UEFA Cup)	0	—		—		41	5
Lyon	2002–03	Ligue 1	31	13	1	0	1	0	7 (Note: Five appearances in UEFA Champions League, two appearances in UEFA Cup)	0	—		1 (Note: Appearance in Trophée des Champions)	0	41	13
Lyon	2003–04	Ligue 1	32	10	3	2	—		10 (Note: Appearances in UEFA Champions League)	5	—		1	0	46	17
Lyon	2004–05	Ligue 1	32	13	2	1	1	0	9	2	—		1	0	45	16
Lyon	2005–06	Ligue 1	32	9	4	1	—		8	4	—		—		44	14
Lyon	2006–07	Ligue 1	31	10	2	1	2	0	7	1	—		—		42	12
Lyon	2007–08	Ligue 1	32	8	4	2	2	0	8	3	—		—		46	13
Lyon	2008–09	Ligue 1	29	7	1	0	1	0	7	3	—		—		38	10
Lyon	Total		248	75	19	7	9	0	64	18	—		3	0	343	100
Al-Gharafa	2009–10	Qatar Stars League	21	7	1	0	—		6 (Note: Appearances in AFC Champions League)	0	—		6 (Note: Appearances in Qatari Sheikh Jassim Cup and Qatar Crown Prince Cup)	3	34	10
Al-Gharafa	2010–11	Qatar Stars League	19	8	3	1	—		5	0	—		5	3	32	12
Al-Gharafa	Total		40	15	4	1	—		11	0	—		11	6	66	22
Vasco da Gama	2011	Série A	21	4	—		—		5 (Note: Appearances in Copa Sudamericana)	1	—		—		26	5
Vasco da Gama	2012	Série A	29	7	—		—		7	2	13	4	—		49	13
Vasco da Gama	Total		50	11	—		—		12	3	13	4	—		75	18
New York Red Bulls	2013	MLS	13	0	2 (Note: Appearances in U.S. Open Cup)	0	—		—		—		—		15	0
Vasco da Gama	2013	Série A	21	2	1	0	—		—		—		—		22	2
Vasco da Gama total			192	40	15	1	—		46	8	80	15	32	7	365	71
Career total			517	133	42	9	9	0	121	26	80	15	47	15	816	198

=== International ===
Appearances and goals by national team and year
National team	Year	Apps	Goals
Brazil	1999	4	0
Brazil	2000	3	0
Brazil	2001	4	0
Brazil	2002	0	0
Brazil	2003	4	0
Brazil	2004	10	0
Brazil	2005	10	4
Brazil	2006	5	2
Total		40	6

Scores and results list Brazil's goal tally first, score column indicates score after each Juninho goal.

List of international goals scored by Juninho Pernambucano
No.	Date	Venue	Opponent	Score	Result	Competition
1	16 June 2005	Zentralstadion, Leipzig, Germany	Greece	3–0	3–0	2005 FIFA Confederations Cup
2	9 October 2005	Estadio Hernando Siles, La Paz, Bolivia	Bolivia	1–0	1–1	2006 FIFA World Cup qualification
3	12 November 2005	Al Nahyan Stadium, Abu Dhabi, United Arab Emirates	United Arab Emirates	5–0	8–0	Friendly
4	12 November 2005	Al Nahyan Stadium, Abu Dhabi, United Arab Emirates	United Arab Emirates	6–0	8–0	Friendly
5	4 June 2006	Stade de Genève, Geneva, Switzerland	New Zealand	4–0	4–0	Friendly
6	22 June 2006	Westfalenstadion, Dortmund, Germany	Japan	2–1	4–1	2006 FIFA World Cup

== Honours ==
Sport Recife

- Campeonato Pernambucano: 1994
- Copa do Nordeste: 1994

Vasco da Gama

- Campeonato Brasileiro Série A: 1997, 2000
- Campeonato Carioca: 1998
- Torneio Rio-São Paulo: 1999
- Copa Libertadores: 1998
- Copa Mercosur: 2000

Lyon

- Ligue 1: 2001–02, 2002–03, 2003–04, 2004–05, 2005–06, 2006–07, 2007–08
- Coupe de France: 2007–08
- Trophée des Champions: 2002, 2003, 2004

Al-Gharafa

- Qatar Stars League: 2009–10
- Qatari Stars Cup: 2009
- Qatar Crown Prince Cup: 2010, 2011

Brazil

- FIFA Confederations Cup: 2005
- Toulon Tournament: 1995
- Lunar New Year Cup: 2005

Individual

- Revista Placar Bola de Prata: 2000
- UNFP Ligue 1 Player of the Month: February 2005, March 2005, October 2006
- UNFP Ligue 1 Player of the Year: 2005–06
- UNFP Ligue 1 Team of the Year: 2003–04, 2004–05, 2005–06
- ESM Team of the Year: 2005–06, 2006–07
- Qatar Football Association Player of the Year: 2010
