= Romain Sartre =

French footballer (born 1982)

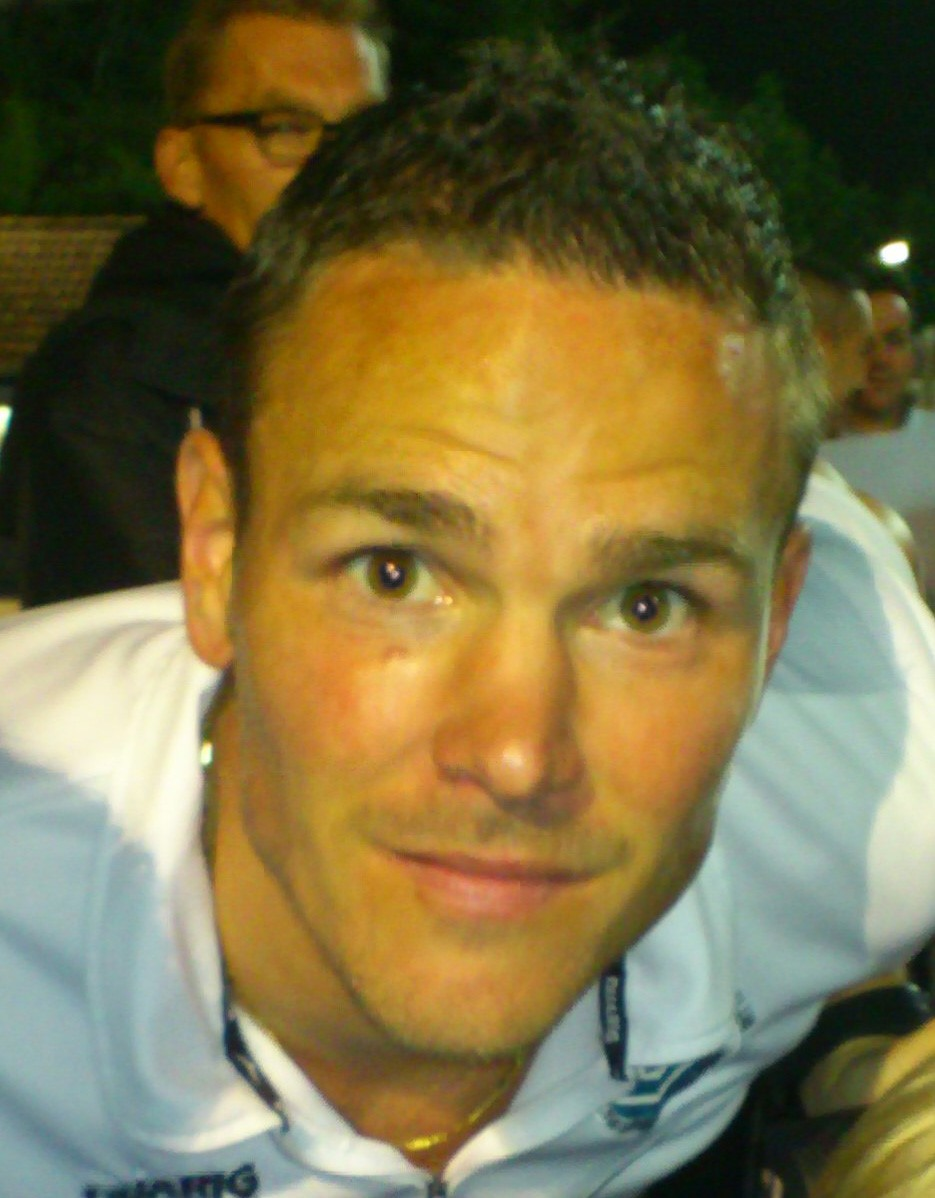

Personal information
- Date of birth: 12 November 1982 (age 43)
- Place of birth: Lyon, France
- Height: 1.85 m (6 ft 1 in)
- Position: Centre-back

Senior career*
Years	Team	Apps	(Gls)
2000–2005	Lyon (B team)	91	(5)
2003–2004	Lyon	3	(0)
2004–2005	→ Laval (loan)	32	(1)
2005–2008	Sedan	94	(5)
2008–2010	Lens	45	(5)
2010–2012	Tours	23	(3)
2012–2013	Villefranche	6	(0)
2013	Châteauroux	15	(2)
2013–2015	Nîmes	34	(4)
2013–2015	Nîmes B	3	(0)
2015–?	Villefranche		
- * Club domestic league appearances and goals as of 01:27, 7 February 2018 (UTC)

Romain Sartre (French pronunciation: [ʁɔmɛ̃ saʁtʁ]; born 12 November 1982) is a French former professional footballer who played as a centre-back.

== Honours ==
- Trophée des Champions: 2003
