= 2002–03 Ligue 1 =

65th season of top-tier French football

Ligue 1
- Season: 2002–03
- Dates: 2 August 2002 – 24 May 2003
- Champions: Lyon (2nd Title)
- Relegated: Le Havre; Sedan; Troyes
- Champions League: Lyon; Monaco; Marseille
- UEFA Cup: Bordeaux; Sochaux; Auxerre; Lens
- Matches: 380
- Goals: 837 (2.2 per match)
- Top goalscorer: Shabani Nonda (26 goals)

For the 2002–03 season, the French Division 1 was renamed as Ligue 1 and was expanded to contain 20 clubs, which played 38 matches against each other, rather than the 34 matches in previous seasons. Lyon won the 2002–03 Ligue 1 season of the French Association Football League with 68 points.

== Participating teams ==
Location of teams in 2002–03 Ligue 1
- AC Ajaccio
- Auxerre
- Bastia
- Bordeaux
- Guingamp
- Le Havre
- Lens
- Lille
- Lyon
- Marseille
- Monaco
- Montpellier
- Nantes
- Nice
- Paris Saint-Germain
- Rennes
- Sedan
- Sochaux
- Strasbourg
- Troyes

== League table ==
Pos	Team	Pld	W	D	L	GF	GA	GD	Pts	Qualification or relegation
1	Lyon (C)	38	19	11	8	63	41	+22	68	Qualification to Champions League group stage
2	Monaco	38	19	10	9	66	33	+33	67	Qualification to Champions League group stage
3	Marseille	38	19	8	11	41	36	+5	65	Qualification to Champions League third qualifying round
4	Bordeaux	38	18	10	10	57	36	+21	64	Qualification to UEFA Cup first round
5	Sochaux	38	17	13	8	46	31	+15	64	Qualification to UEFA Cup first round
6	Auxerre	38	18	10	10	38	29	+9	64	Qualification to UEFA Cup first round
7	Guingamp	38	19	5	14	59	46	+13	62	Qualification to Intertoto Cup third round
8	Lens	38	14	15	9	43	31	+12	57	Qualification to UEFA Cup qualifying round (Note: Lens qualified for the UEFA Cup qualifying round through the UEFA Fair Play ranking award.)
9	Nantes	38	16	8	14	37	39	−2	56	Qualification to Intertoto Cup third round
10	Nice	38	13	16	9	39	31	+8	55	Qualification to Intertoto Cup second round
11	Paris Saint-Germain	38	14	12	12	47	36	+11	54	
12	Bastia	38	12	11	15	40	48	−8	47	
13	Strasbourg	38	11	12	15	40	54	−14	45	
14	Lille	38	10	12	16	29	44	−15	42	
15	Rennes	38	10	10	18	35	45	−10	40	
16	Montpellier	38	10	10	18	37	54	−17	40	
17	Ajaccio	38	9	12	17	29	49	−20	39	
18	Le Havre (R)	38	10	8	20	27	47	−20	38	Relegation to Ligue 2
19	Sedan (R)	38	9	9	20	41	59	−18	36	Relegation to Ligue 2
20	Troyes (R)	38	7	10	21	23	48	−25	31	Relegation to Ligue 2

Source: Ligue 1
Rules for classification: 1) points; 2) goal difference; 3) number of goals scored.
(C) Champions; (R) Relegated

== Results ==
Home \ Away	ACA	AUX	BAS	BOR	GUI	LHA	RCL	LIL	OL	OM	ASM	MHS	NAN	NIC	PSG	REN	SED	SOC	STR	TRO
Ajaccio		1–0	1–1	1–6	0–2	1–2	0–0	2–2	0–1	0–2	2–4	0–0	1–0	2–0	0–0	1–0	1–0	0–1	0–0	1–0
Auxerre	1–0		1–0	1–0	2–1	1–0	0–0	0–0	1–2	0–0	1–1	2–0	0–1	0–2	2–0	1–0	3–1 (Note: Counting for the Round 8 of Ligue 1, and initially concluded on 21 September 2002 with the same score of 3-1 (goals, in that order, from Kapo, N'Diefi and doubled by Benjani), the match was canceled following a technical reservation filed by Sedan after the second Auxerre goal: this goal had indeed been scored immediately after the Sedan equalizer, but the Sedan players had not all returned to their camp at kick-off. The match was finally replayed on 8 April 2003 (two months after the "return" match, played on 5 February 2003) with a similar result (goals, in that order, from Benjani, N'Diefi, Benjani and Cissé).)	2–0	0–0	1–0
Bastia	1–2	2–0		2–1	0–2	3–1	1–1	1–0	2–0	2–0	1–0	1–2	3–1	1–1	1–0	3–1	0–1	2–2	1–1	1–1
Bordeaux	1–0	0–1	0–2		4–2	2–0	1–0	2–0	0–1	3–1	2–2	3–1	0–0	4–0	0–0	2–0	2–2	2–0	1–2	1–0
Guingamp	3–1	0–2	3–0	0–0		1–2	1–0	1–0	3–3	0–0	3–1	3–1	2–0	0–0	3–2	3–0	0–1	2–0	2–3	2–0
Le Havre	0–1	0–1	2–0	1–0	1–2		1–3	0–0	1–2	1–3	0–3	1–0	1–1	2–1	0–1	0–1	2–1	1–0	1–1	1–0
Lens	1–1	3–1	2–0	3–3	1–3	1–0		0–0	2–2	0–1	1–0	4–0	0–1	0–0	3–2	1–0	4–0	1–1	1–1	1–0
Lille	2–0	2–2	1–1	0–3	2–1	1–0	0–2		2–1	3–0	1–3	2–0	0–1	0–3	2–1	1–0	0–0	1–0	0–1	0–0
Lyon	3–1	3–0	4–1	4–2	1–4	2–1	1–0	0–0		1–0	1–3	1–1	0–0	2–2	1–0	4–1	6–1	4–1	2–1	0–0
Marseille	3–1	0–0	2–1	2–1	0–2	2–0	1–0	2–0	1–1		1–1	2–0	0–2	2–0	0–3	2–0	4–2	1–0	1–0	0–0
Monaco	3–2	3–1	0–0	0–1	4–0	1–1	1–1	1–1	2–0	0–1		3–1	2–1	0–1	3–1	2–1	3–0	1–0	2–0	6–0
Montpellier	0–1	0–0	2–2	0–1	2–0	0–0	0–2	1–0	1–1	1–2	1–2		1–0	2–2	1–1	1–0	2–0	0–2	2–1	2–2
Nantes	1–0	1–4	1–0	0–0	0–4	2–0	2–2	1–0	1–0	1–0	0–2	3–1		0–0	1–1	1–0	4–1	0–1	4–1	2–1
Nice	3–0	1–0	2–0	1–1	1–0	1–2	0–0	2–0	0–1	2–0	1–0	2–1	1–1		0–0	0–0	0–0	2–2	4–0	1–0
Paris SG	2–2	1–0	1–1	1–1	5–0	1–0	0–1	1–0	2–0	3–0	2–1	1–3	0–1	1–1		0–0	2–0	1–1	3–0	4–2
Rennes	0–0	0–0	0–1	3–4	2–1	0–0	1–1	5–1	0–1	1–3	0–0	3–1	1–0	2–2	1–0		1–0	2–2	2–3	0–0
Sedan	1–1	1–2	2–2	0–1	2–0	4–0	0–1	0–1	1–1	1–2	2–2	1–2	1–0	3–0	3–1	1–3		0–0	2–1	4–0
Sochaux	1–1	1–1	2–0	2–0	0–0	1–0	3–0	2–2	2–1	3–0	0–0	0–0	4–2	1–0	0–0	1–0	2–1		2–0	1–0
Strasbourg	1–1	1–2	2–0	1–1	3–1	1–1	2–0	2–2	0–4	0–0	1–0	3–2	2–0	0–0	0–1	1–3	1–1	1–3		2–1
Troyes	1–0	1–2	3–0	0–1	0–2	1–1	0–0	2–0	1–1	0–0	0–4	0–2	2–0	1–0	1–2	0–1	2–0	0–2	1–0	

Source: Ligue 1
Legend: Blue = home team win; Yellow = draw; Red = away team win.

== Top goalscorers ==
Rank	Player	Club	Goals
1	(Democratic Republic of the Congo) Shabani Nonda	Monaco	26
2	(Portugal) Pauleta	Bordeaux	23
3	(Ivory Coast) Didier Drogba	Guingamp	17
4	(France) Djibril Cissé	Auxerre	14
4	(Senegal) Henri Camara	Sedan	14
6	(Brazil) Juninho	Lyon	13
7	(Brazil) Sonny Anderson	Lyon	12
7	(Croatia) Dado Pršo	Monaco	12
7	(Guinea) Kaba Diawara	Nice	12
7	(France) Antoine Sibierski	Lens	12

== Awards ==
=== Annual awards ===
Award	Winner	Club
Player of the Year	(Portugal) Pauleta	Bordeaux
Young Player of the Year	(France) Lionel Mathis	Auxerre
Goalkeeper of the Year	(France) Grégory Coupet	Lyon
Manager of the Year	(France) Guy Lacombe	Sochaux
Goal of the Year	(Brazil) Ronaldinho	Paris Saint-Germain
Fair Play Award	(France) Mickaël Landreau	Nantes
Honorary Award	(France) Alain Roche	—

Team of the Year
Goalkeeper	(France) Grégory Coupet (Lyon)			
Defenders	(France) Johan Radet (Auxerre)	(Belgium) Daniel Van Buyten (Marseille)	(France) Philippe Mexès (Auxerre)	(France) Manuel Dos Santos (Marseille)
Midfielders	(France) Ludovic Giuly (Monaco)	(Ghana) Michael Essien (Bastia)	(France) Benoît Pedretti (Sochaux)	(France) Jérôme Rothen (Monaco)
Forwards	(Democratic Republic of the Congo) Shabani Nonda (Monaco)		(Portugal) Pauleta (Bordeaux)	

== Overall ==
- Most wins - Lyon, Monaco, Marseille and Guingamp (19)
- Fewest wins - Troyes (7)
- Most draws - Nice (16)
- Fewest draws - Guingamp (5)
- Most losses - Troyes (21)
- Fewest losses - Lyon and Sochaux
- Most goals scored - Monaco (66)
- Fewest goals scored - Troyes (23)
- Most goals conceded - Sedan (59)
- Fewest goals conceded - Auxerre (29)

== Attendances ==
No.	Club	Average attendance	Change	Highest
1	Olympique de Marseille	50,813	1.5%	56,529
2	Paris Saint-Germain FC	38,481	-6.2%	43,284
3	RC Lens	37,206	-0.8%	40,825
4	Olympique lyonnais	36,718	5.4%	40,152
5	FC Nantes	32,421	-2.9%	36,411
6	Girondins de Bordeaux	27,023	-3.0%	32,793
7	Stade rennais	18,247	2.1%	23,572
8	LOSC	15,599	-12.5%	20,211
9	CS Sedan	15,412	-7.1%	26,857
10	FC Sochaux-Montbéliard	15,256	-7.4%	19,910
11	RC Strasbourg	14,779	55.6%	18,001
12	EA Guingamp	14,566	19.4%	22.754
13	OGC Nice	13,488	98.4%	16,668
14	MHSC	12,545	-9.5%	26,096
15	Le Havre AC	12,055	30.4%	16,185
16	ESTAC	11,283	-19.0%	14,211
17	AJ auxerroise	10,463	-14.6%	16,999
18	AS Monaco	8,232	-3.6%	17,172
19	SC Bastia	7,501	3.9%	10,055
20	AC Ajaccio	4,840	81.7%	8,305
