= 2003–04 Ligue 1 =

66th season of top-tier French football

Ligue 1
- Season: 2003–04
- Dates: 1 August 2003 – 23 May 2004
- Champions: Lyon (3rd Title)
- Relegated: Guingamp; Le Mans; Montpellier
- Champions League: Lyon; Paris Saint-Germain; Monaco
- UEFA Cup: Auxerre; Sochaux
- Matches: 380
- Goals: 884 (2.33 per match)
- Top goalscorer: Djibril Cissé (26 goals)

Olympique Lyonnais won Ligue 1 season 2003–04 of the French Association Football League with 79 points.

== Participating teams ==
- AC Ajaccio
- Auxerre
- Bastia
- Bordeaux
- Guingamp
- Le Mans
- Lens
- Lille
- Lyon
- Marseille
- Metz
- Monaco
- Montpellier
- Nantes
- Nice
- Paris Saint-Germain
- Rennes
- Sochaux
- Strasbourg
- Toulouse
Location of teams in 2003–04 Ligue 1

== League table ==
Pos	Team	Pld	W	D	L	GF	GA	GD	Pts	Qualification or relegation
1	Lyon (C)	38	24	7	7	64	26	+38	79	Qualification to Champions League group stage
2	Paris Saint-Germain	38	22	10	6	50	28	+22	76	Qualification to Champions League group stage
3	Monaco	38	21	12	5	59	30	+29	75	Qualification to Champions League third qualifying round
4	Auxerre	38	19	8	11	60	34	+26	65	Qualification to UEFA Cup first round
5	Sochaux	38	18	9	11	54	42	+12	63	Qualification to UEFA Cup first round
6	Nantes	38	17	9	12	47	35	+12	60	Qualification to Intertoto Cup third round
7	Marseille	38	17	6	15	51	45	+6	57	
8	Lens	38	15	8	15	34	48	−14	53	
9	Rennes	38	14	10	14	56	44	+12	52	
10	Lille	38	14	9	15	41	41	0	51	Qualification to Intertoto Cup third round
11	Nice	38	11	17	10	42	39	+3	50	Qualification to Intertoto Cup second round
12	Bordeaux	38	13	11	14	40	43	−3	50	
13	Strasbourg	38	10	13	15	43	50	−7	43	
14	Metz	38	11	9	18	34	42	−8	42	
15	Ajaccio	38	10	10	18	33	55	−22	40	
16	Toulouse	38	9	12	17	31	44	−13	39	
17	Bastia	38	9	12	17	33	49	−16	39	
18	Guingamp (R)	38	10	8	20	36	58	−22	38	Relegation to Ligue 2
19	Le Mans (R)	38	9	11	18	35	57	−22	38	Relegation to Ligue 2
20	Montpellier (R)	38	8	7	23	41	74	−33	31	Relegation to Ligue 2

Source: Ligue 1
Rules for classification: 1) points; 2) goal difference; 3) number of goals scored.
(C) Champions; (R) Relegated

== Results ==
Home \ Away	ACA	AUX	BAS	BOR	GUI	MFC	RCL	LIL	OL	OM	MET	ASM	MHS	NAN	NIC	PSG	REN	SOC	STR	TFC
Ajaccio		1–2	1–0	1–0	0–0	2–0	2–0	0–3	2–4	0–1	3–1	0–1	0–0	1–3	1–1	0–0	1–0	1–0	0–0	2–1
Auxerre	1–1		4–1	5–0	3–0	1–0	2–0	3–0	1–2	2–0	2–1	0–0	0–1	2–0	1–2	1–1	2–1	2–1	3–2	3–2
Bastia	1–1	0–0		0–2	4–2	0–0	3–1	0–2	0–0	4–1	0–2	0–0	1–0	1–3	2–1	0–1	3–2	2–0	0–0	1–0
Bordeaux	1–0	2–0	1–1		2–0	2–0	0–0	2–1	1–1	1–0	2–0	1–3	0–1	2–0	1–1	3–0	2–1	1–3	1–1	1–2
Guingamp	2–0	2–2	1–0	1–3		2–4	1–0	2–1	2–0	0–1	1–1	1–2	4–3	1–1	1–2	0–2	0–2	1–2	3–2	1–0
Le Mans	0–1	2–1	1–1	0–0	2–0		3–0	1–1	0–2	0–0	2–0	0–1	4–0	0–1	1–1	0–1	2–2	2–2	0–3	2–1
Lens	2–0	1–3	0–0	1–0	2–1	0–0		2–1	1–1	2–1	0–2	0–0	3–2	0–0	1–0	1–0	2–1	0–3	2–1	1–1
Lille	0–0	1–0	2–0	2–1	1–3	1–1	1–1		1–0	0–2	1–1	1–1	1–1	2–0	1–2	1–0	1–0	2–0	0–1	0–1
Lyon	4–0	1–1	1–0	3–0	0–1	2–0	4–0	3–0		1–2	2–1	3–1	3–0	1–0	5–0	1–1	3–0	1–1	1–0	0–0
Marseille	2–1	1–0	3–1	1–1	2–1	5–0	3–2	2–1	1–4		0–1	1–2	1–1	1–1	2–1	0–1	2–0	2–0	4–0	1–0
Metz	0–1	0–2	1–0	3–1	1–1	5–0	0–2	0–1	1–2	1–1		0–2	2–1	1–3	1–0	0–1	1–1	0–1	1–0	0–2
Monaco	3–3	1–1	2–0	2–0	3–1	4–2	2–0	0–1	3–0	1–0	1–0		4–0	0–1	1–1	1–1	1–4	1–1	2–0	3–0
Montpellier	3–1	1–0	1–1	1–2	2–0	0–3	1–0	0–2	0–2	0–1	0–1	1–2		4–1	2–2	3–2	1–1	1–3	1–2	0–1
Nantes	4–0	1–0	1–1	0–0	0–0	1–0	2–0	2–0	0–1	1–0	2–2	0–1	3–2		3–1	0–1	1–0	3–1	1–1	1–1
Nice	2–2	1–1	2–0	0–0	2–0	0–1	4–0	2–0	0–1	0–0	1–1	1–2	2–1	1–0		1–2	3–1	1–0	0–0	1–1
Paris SG	1–0	1–0	0–0	2–1	2–0	5–1	0–1	1–0	1–0	2–1	0–0	2–4	6–1	3–2	0–0		1–0	1–1	3–2	2–1
Rennes	4–1	0–2	4–0	3–1	0–0	2–0	2–0	2–2	3–1	4–3	0–0	1–0	4–0	0–3	0–0	1–1		4–0	1–1	1–0
Sochaux	2–0	3–2	2–1	1–1	2–0	3–0	0–3	2–1	1–2	2–1	2–0	1–1	3–1	2–1	0–0	0–1	1–1		3–0	3–1
Strasbourg	3–2	0–2	4–2	1–1	2–0	3–0	0–1	2–2	0–1	4–1	0–2	0–0	4–2	1–0	2–2	0–0	0–3	0–2		0–0
Toulouse	3–1	0–3	0–2	1–0	0–0	1–1	1–2	0–3	0–1	2–1	1–0	1–1	2–2	0–1	1–1	0–1	2–0	0–0	1–1	

Source: Ligue 1
Legend: Blue = home team win; Yellow = draw; Red = away team win.

== Top goalscorers ==
Rank	Player	Club	Goals
1	(France) Djibril Cissé	Auxerre	26
2	(Switzerland) Alexander Frei	Rennes	20
3	(Ivory Coast) Didier Drogba	Marseille	19
4	(Portugal) Pauleta	Paris Saint-Germain	18
5	(France) Pierre-Alain Frau	Sochaux	17
6	(France) Péguy Luyindula	Lyon	16
6	(France) Habib Bamogo	Montpellier	16
8	(Tunisia) Francileudo Santos	Sochaux	14
9	(Bulgaria) Vladimir Manchev	Lille	13
9	(France) Ludovic Giuly	Monaco	13

== Awards ==
=== Player of the Month ===
Month	Player
January	(Ivory Coast) Didier Drogba (Marseille)
February	(Serbia and Montenegro) Danijel Ljuboja (Paris Saint-Germain)
March	(Romania) Viorel Moldovan (Nantes)
April	(Argentina) Juan Pablo Sorín (Paris Saint-Germain)
May	(Ivory Coast) Didier Drogba (Marseille)

=== Individual awards ===
Award	Player	Club
Ligue 1 Player of the Year	(Ivory Coast) Didier Drogba	Marseille
Ligue 1 Young Player of the Year	(France) Patrice Evra	Monaco
Ligue 1 Goalkeeper of the Year	(France) Grégory Coupet	Lyon
Ligue 1 Coach of the Year	(France) Didier Deschamps	Monaco
Trophée du Plus Beau But de Ligue 1	(Ivory Coast) Didier Drogba	Marseille
UNFP Trophy of Honour	(France) Laurent Blanc	
Ligue 1 Referee of the Year	(France) Bertrand Layec	
Ligue 1 Assistant Referee of the Year	(France) Serge Vallin	

Team of the Year
Goalkeeper	(France) Grégory Coupet (Lyon)			
Defenders	(France) Bernard Mendy (Paris Saint-Germain)	(Colombia) Mario Yepes (Nantes)	(France) Sébastien Squillaci (Monaco)	(France) Patrice Evra (Monaco)
Midfielders	(France) Benoît Pedretti (Sochaux)	(Argentina) Lucas Bernardi (Monaco)	(Brazil) Juninho (Lyon)	(France) Ludovic Giuly (Monaco)
Forwards	(Ivory Coast) Didier Drogba (Marseille)	(Spain) Fernando Morientes (Monaco)		

== Attendances ==
No.	Club	Average attendance	Change	Highest
1	Olympique de Marseille	51,795	1.9%	56,207
2	Paris Saint-Germain FC	38,810	0.9%	42,502
3	Olympique lyonnais	36,012	-1.9%	39,944
4	RC Lens	34,821	-6.4%	40,455
5	FC Nantes	30,804	-5.0%	36,465
6	Girondins de Bordeaux	23,620	-12.6%	32,507
7	Toulouse FC	20,079	95.5%	35,005
8	FC Metz	18,002	37.3%	28,511
9	Stade Rennais FC	17,288	-5.3%	22,143
10	RC Strasbourg	16,556	12.0%	26,943
11	FC Sochaux-Montbéliard	16,497	8.1%	19,791
12	LOSC	15,093	-3.2%	20,480
13	EA Guingamp	14,724	1.1%	18,002
14	AJ auxerroise	12,907	23.4%	21,112
15	Le Mans FC	12,756	72.4%	16,312
16	MHSC	11,961	-4.7%	21,085
17	OGC Nice	11,934	-11.5%	15,686
18	AS Monaco	10,394	26.3%	16,560
19	SC Bastia	5,997	-20.1%	8,910
20	AC Ajaccio	3,515	-27.4%	8,204
