= 2005–06 AC Milan season =

Milan
2005–06 season
- Chairman: Chairman Commission
- Manager: Carlo Ancelotti
- Stadium: San Siro
- Serie A: 3rd (originally 2nd)
- Coppa Italia: Quarter-finals
- UEFA Champions League: Semi-finals
- Top goalscorer: League: Andriy Shevchenko (19); All: Andriy Shevchenko (28)
- Highest home attendance: 79,706 vs Juventus, Serie A, 29 October 2005
- Lowest home attendance: 1,473 vs Brescia, Coppa Italia, 29 November 2005
- Average home league attendance: 59,993
Home colours	Away colours	Third colours

In 2005–06 season Associazione Calcio Milan had a rather modest season compared to its previous seasons, before being rocked by a minor involvement in the 2006 Italian football scandal, where rivals Juventus was relegated and stripped of two league titles. Due to Milan's involvement, it did not inherit either of the titles, instead being penalised and dropped down the 2006 order, initially out of European football but later reinstated into fourth, which meant UEFA Champions League qualification, a tournament Milan then went on to win. However, Milan started the 2006–07 Serie A season with an eight-point deduction, which complicated hopes of a new league title.

On the pitch, Milan was not able to challenge Juventus for the virtual league title, then going out against Barcelona in the Champions League.

Following the season, the club sold Andriy Shevchenko for €40 million, the highest fee paid for a player turning 30 in the same year, to English club Chelsea.

== Players ==
=== Squad information ===
Squad at end of season

Note: Flags indicate national team as defined under FIFA eligibility rules; some limited exceptions apply. Players may hold more than one non-FIFA nationality.

No.	Pos.	Nation	Player
1	GK	BRA	Dida
2	DF	BRA	Cafu
3	DF	ITA	Paolo Maldini (captain)
4	DF	GEO	Kakha Kaladze
5	DF	ITA	Alessandro Costacurta (vice-captain)
7	FW	UKR	Andriy Shevchenko
8	MF	ITA	Gennaro Gattuso
9	FW	ITA	Filippo Inzaghi
10	MF	POR	Rui Costa
11	FW	ITA	Alberto Gilardino
12	GK	ITA	Valerio Fiori
13	DF	ITA	Alessandro Nesta

No.	Pos.	Nation	Player
14	MF	SUI	Johann Vogel
16	GK	AUS	Zeljko Kalac
17	DF	CRO	Dario Šimić
18	MF	CZE	Marek Jankulovski
20	MF	NED	Clarence Seedorf
21	MF	ITA	Andrea Pirlo
22	MF	BRA	Kaká
23	MF	ITA	Massimo Ambrosini
27	MF	BRA	Serginho
31	DF	NED	Jaap Stam
37	FW	BRA	Márcio Amoroso

=== Left club during season ===
Note: Flags indicate national team as defined under FIFA eligibility rules; some limited exceptions apply. Players may hold more than one non-FIFA nationality.

No.	Pos.	Nation	Player
32	FW	ITA	Christian Vieri (to Monaco)
33	GK	GRE	Dimitrios Eleftheropoulos (to Roma)

No.	Pos.	Nation	Player
—	MF	ITA	Andrea Amato (on loan to Biellese)
—	FW	ITA	Roberto Massaro (to Olbia)

=== Reserve squad ===
Note: Flags indicate national team as defined under FIFA eligibility rules; some limited exceptions apply. Players may hold more than one non-FIFA nationality.

No.	Pos.	Nation	Player
41	FW	ITA	Matteo Ardemagni
43	FW	FRA	Willy Aubameyang
44	MF	SVN	Sandro Bloudek
45	MF	ITA	Gastone Bottini
46	DF	ITA	Lino Marzoratti

No.	Pos.	Nation	Player
47	DF	ITA	Elia Legati
48	MF	ITA	Federico Piazza
49	FW	ITA	Davide Di Gennaro
50	GK	ITA	Davide Facchin

== Competitions ==
Win Draw Loss

=== Serie A ===
==== League table ====
Pos	Team	Pld	W	D	L	GF	GA	GD	Pts	Qualification or relegation
1	Inter Milan (C)	38	23	7	8	68	30	+38	76	Qualification to Champions League group stage
2	Roma	38	19	12	7	70	42	+28	69	Qualification to Champions League group stage
3	Milan (Note: Milan, Fiorentina and Lazio were docked 30 points, all for involvement in the Calciopoli.)	38	28	4	6	85	31	+54	58	Qualification to Champions League third qualifying round
4	Chievo	38	13	15	10	54	49	+5	54	Qualification to Champions League third qualifying round
5	Palermo	38	13	13	12	50	52	−2	52	Qualification to UEFA Cup first round

Source: 2005–06 Serie A, Soccerway
Rules for classification: 1) points; 2) goal difference; 3) number of goals scored.
(C) Champions

==== Results summary ====
Overall								Home						Away					
Pld	W	D	L	GF	GA	GD	Pts	W	D	L	GF	GA	GD	W	D	L	GF	GA	GD
38	28	4	6	85	31	+54	88	18	1	0	50	13	+37	10	3	6	35	18	+17

Source: Competitive matches

==== Results by round ====
Round	1	2	3	4	5	6	7	8	9	10	11	12	13	14	15	16	17	18	19	20	21	22	23	24	25	26	27	28	29	30	31	32	33	34	35	36	37	38
Ground	A	H	A	H	A	H	H	A	H	A	H	A	H	A	A	A	H	H	A	A	H	A	H	H	A	A	H	A	H	A	H	A	H	A	H	A	H	A
Result	D	W	L	W	W	W	W	W	W	W	W	L	W	L	L	W	W	W	L	W	W	D	D	W	W	W	W	W	D	W	W	L	W	W	W	W	W	W
Position	9	4	10	7	4	2	2	2	2	2	2	2	2	2	4	3	3	2	3	3	3	3	3	3	2	2	2	2	2	2	2	2	2	2	2	2	2	3

Source: Competitive matches
A = Away; H = Home; W = Win; D = Draw; L = Loss; = Leader, UEFA Champions League Groups stage; = UEFA Champions League Groups stage; = UEFA Champions League Qualifying round; = 2006–07 UEFA Cup; = 2006–07 Serie B; R = 2006–07 Serie B, Juventus were originally the first-placed team, but were placed at the bottom of the league table due to the Calciopoli scandal, relegating them to Serie B.
The title was put sub judice, then assigned to Internazionale, the team taking the first place after the courts.
Milan, Fiorentina and Lazio were docked 30 points, all for involvement in the Calciopoli.

==== Matches ====
28 August 2005 1	Ascoli	1–1	Milan	Ascoli Piceno
15:00 CEST (UTC+02:00)	Cudini 58'	Report	Shevchenko 64'	Stadium: Stadio Cino e Lillo Del Duca; Attendance: 22,919; Referee: Massimo De Santis

10 September 2005 2	Milan	3–1	Siena	Milan
20:30 CEST (UTC+02:00)	Ambrosini 15'; Shevchenko 31'; Kaká 81'	Report	Tudor 45'	Stadium: San Siro; Attendance: 56,468; Referee: Stefano Farina

18 September 2005 3	Sampdoria	2–1	Milan	Genoa
15:00 CEST (UTC+02:00)	Bonazzoli 38'; Tonetto 57'	Report	Gilardino 18'	Stadium: Stadio Luigi Ferraris; Attendance: 27,809; Referee: Paolo Bertini

21 September 2005 4	Milan	2–0	Lazio	Milan
20:30 CEST (UTC+02:00)	Shevchenko 12'; Kaká 14'	Report		Stadium: San Siro; Attendance: 57,778; Referee: Domenico Messina

25 September 2005 5	Treviso	0–2	Milan	Padua
15:00 CEST (UTC+02:00)		Report	Shevchenko 43' (pen.); Gilardino 72'	Stadium: Stadio Euganeo; Attendance: 17,389; Referee: Luca Palanca

2 October 2005 6	Milan	2–1	Reggina	Milan
15:00 CEST (UTC+02:00)	Maldini 5', 20'	Report	Cavalli 90+3'	Stadium: San Siro; Attendance: 57,538; Referee: Nicola Rizzoli

16 October 2005 7	Cagliari	0–2	Milan	Cagliari
20:30 CEST (UTC+02:00)		Report	Gilardino 1'; Shevchenko 27'	Stadium: Stadio Sant'Elia; Attendance: 15,000; Referee: Domenico Messina

23 October 2005 8	Milan	2–1	Palermo	Milan
15:00 CEST (UTC+02:00)	Gattuso 29'; Inzaghi 78'	Report	Caracciolo 28'	Stadium: San Siro; Attendance: 63,115; Referee: Stefano Farina

26 October 2005 9	Empoli	1–3	Milan	Empoli
20:30 CEST (UTC+02:00)	Vannucchi 36'	Report	Gilardino 45+1', 50'; Vieri 55'	Stadium: Stadio Carlo Castellani; Attendance: 10,000; Referee: Matteo Trefoloni

29 October 2005 10	Milan	3–1	Juventus	Milan
20:30 CEST (UTC+02:00)	Seedorf 14'; Kaká 26'; Pirlo 45'	Report	Trezeguet 76'	Stadium: San Siro; Attendance: 79,706; Referee: Paolo Bertini

6 November 2005 11	Milan	5–1	Udinese	Milan
15:00 CET (UTC+01:00)	Gilardino 25', 53'; Seedorf 37'; Pirlo 45'; Kaká 77'	Report	Iaquinta 60' (pen.)	Stadium: San Siro; Attendance: 57,942; Referee: Tiziano Pieri

20 November 2005 12	Fiorentina	3–1	Milan	Florence
15:00 CET (UTC+01:00)	Toni 10', 87'; Jørgensen 46'	Report	Gilardino 25'	Stadium: Stadio Artemio Franchi; Attendance: 43,950; Referee: Pasquale Rodomonti P.

26 November 2005 13	Milan	2–1	Lecce	Milan
20:30 CET (UTC+01:00)	Pirlo 3'; Inzaghi 90+4'	Report	Konan 67'	Stadium: San Siro; Attendance: 55,129; Referee: Daniele Tombolini

3 December 2005 14	Chievo	2–1	Milan	Verona
18:00 CET (UTC+01:00)	Pellissier 45+1'; Tiribocchi 82'	Report	Kaladze 22'	Stadium: Stadio Marc'Antonio Bentegodi; Attendance: 14,733; Referee: Tiziano Pieri

11 December 2005 15	Internazionale	3–2	Milan	Milan
20:30 CET (UTC+01:00)	Adriano 24' (pen.), 90+2'; Martins 59'	Report	Shevchenko 39' (pen.); Stam 83'	Stadium: San Siro; Attendance: 76,416; Referee: Domenico Messina

18 December 2005 16	Milan	4–0	Messina	Milan
15:00 CET (UTC+01:00)	Shevchenko 23' (pen.), 48'; Pirlo 83'; Gilardino 85'	Report		Stadium: San Siro; Attendance: 60,434; Referee: Paolo Tagliavento

21 December 2005 17	Livorno	0–3	Milan	Livorno
20:30 CET (UTC+01:00)		Report	Gilardino 23', 60'; Shevchenko 71'	Stadium: Stadio Armando Picchi; Attendance: 16,304; Referee: Matteo Trefoloni

8 January 2006 18	Milan	4–3	Parma	Milan
20:30 CET (UTC+01:00)	Cardone 27' (o.g.); Gilardino 29'; Kaká 36'; Shevchenko 81'	Report	Cannavaro 24'; Marchionni 70', 85'	Stadium: San Siro; Attendance: 54,338; Referee: Paolo Mazzoleni

15 January 2006 19	Roma	1–0	Milan	Rome
20:30 CET (UTC+01:00)	Mancini 81'	Report		Stadium: Stadio Olimpico; Attendance: 48,952; Referee: Roberto Rosetti

18 January 2006 20	Milan	1–0	Ascoli	Milan
20:30 CET (UTC+01:00)	Inzaghi 5'	Report		Stadium: San Siro; Attendance: 53,076; Referee: Gianluca Rocchi

22 January 2006 21	Siena	0–3	Milan	Siena
15:00 CET (UTC+01:00)		Report	Kaká 12', 84'; Shevchenko 69'	Stadium: Stadio Artemio Franchi – Montepaschi Arena; Attendance: 10,693; Referee: Emidio Morganti

28 January 2006 22	Milan	1–1	Sampdoria	Milan
20:30 CET (UTC+01:00)	Shevchenko 13' (pen.)	Report	Gasbarroni 36'	Stadium: San Siro; Attendance: 55,395; Referee: Massimo De Santis

5 February 2006 23	Lazio	0–0	Milan	Rome
20:30 CET (UTC+01:00)		Report		Stadium: Stadio Olimpico; Attendance: 29,956; Referee: Massimiliano Saccani

8 February 2006 24	Milan	5–0	Treviso	Milan
20:30 CET (UTC+01:00)	Kaká 14'; Shevchenko 53', 64'; Gilardino 62'; Inzaghi 73'	Report		Stadium: San Siro; Attendance: 52,017; Referee: Nicola Stefanini

12 February 2006 25	Reggina	1–4	Milan	Reggio Calabria
15:00 CET (UTC+01:00)	Paredes 9'	Report	Inzaghi 14', 52', 90+3'; Gilardino 37'	Stadium: Stadio Oreste Granillo; Attendance: 12,669; Referee: Daniele Tombolini

18 February 2006 26	Milan	1–0	Cagliari	Milan
20:30 CET (UTC+01:00)	Gilardino 23' (pen.)	Report		Stadium: San Siro; Attendance: 54,599; Referee: Emidio Morganti

26 February 2006 27	Palermo	0–2	Milan	Palermo
15:00 CET (UTC+01:00)		Report	Inzaghi 72'; Shevchenko 82' (pen.)	Stadium: Stadio Renzo Barbera; Attendance: 31,868; Referee: Tiziano Pieri

4 March 2006 28	Milan	3–0	Empoli	Milan
18:00 CET (UTC+01:00)	Inzaghi 77', 86'; Shevchenko 81'	Report		Stadium: San Siro; Attendance: 54,419; Referee: Paolo Dondarini

12 March 2006 29	Juventus	0–0	Milan	Turin
20:30 CET (UTC+01:00)		Report		Stadium: Stadio delle Alpi; Attendance: 39,087; Referee: Massimo De Santis

19 March 2006 30	Udinese	0–4	Milan	Udine
15:00 CET (UTC+01:00)		Report	Shevchenko 42', 65'; Gilardino 61'; Seedorf 71'	Stadium: Stadio Friuli; Attendance: 19,242; Referee: Matteo Trefoloni

25 March 2006 31	Milan	3–1	Fiorentina	Milan
20:30 CET (UTC+01:00)	Shevchenko 20'; Kaká 48'; Gattuso 60'	Report	Toni 13'	Stadium: San Siro; Attendance: 64,700; Referee: Gianluca Paparesta

1 April 2006 32	Lecce	1–0	Milan	Lecce
18:00 CEST (UTC+02:00)	Konan 54'	Report		Stadium: Stadio Via del Mare; Attendance: 14,521; Referee: Paolo Dondarini

9 April 2006 33	Milan	4–1	Chievo	Milan
15:00 CEST (UTC+02:00)	Nesta 29'; Kaká 62', 69' (pen.), 90+1'	Report	Pellissier 13'	Stadium: San Siro; Attendance: 60,762; Referee: Paolo Bertini

14 April 2006 34	Milan	1–0	Internazionale	Milan
18:00 CEST (UTC+02:00)	Kaladze 70'	Report		Stadium: San Siro; Attendance: 74,137; Referee: Massimo De Santis

22 April 2006 35	Messina	1–3	Milan	Messina
15:00 CEST (UTC+02:00)	Sculli 7'	Report	Jankulovski 33'; Gattuso 44'; Gilardino 90'	Stadium: Stadio San Filippo; Attendance: 26,461; Referee: Tiziano Pieri

30 April 2006 36	Milan	2–0	Livorno	Milan
15:00 CEST (UTC+02:00)	Inzaghi 28', 65'	Report		Stadium: San Siro; Attendance: 62,008; Referee: Salvatore Racalbuto

7 May 2006 37	Parma	2–3	Milan	Parma
15:00 CEST (UTC+02:00)	Corradi 54', 88'	Report	Kaká 29' (pen.); Cafu 43'; Seedorf 56'	Stadium: Stadio Ennio Tardini; Attendance: 20,631; Referee: Gianluca Paparesta

14 May 2006 38	Milan	2–1	Roma	Milan
15:00 CEST (UTC+02:00)	Kaká 5' (pen.); Amoroso 90+1' (pen.)	Report	Mexès 34'	Stadium: San Siro; Attendance: 66,305; Referee: Andrea De Marco

=== Coppa Italia ===
==== Round of 16 ====
29 November 2005 First leg	Milan	3–1	Brescia	Milan
21:00 CET (UTC+01:00)	Costa 26'; Gilardino 40'; Vieri 69'		Alberti 48'	Stadium: San Siro; Attendance: 1,473; Referee: Nicola Rizzoli

11 January 2006 Second leg	Brescia	3–4 (4–7 agg.)	Milan	Brescia
21:00 CET (UTC+01:00)	Del Nero 38'; Di Biagio 61' (pen.); Hamšík 71'		Seedorf 15'; Inzaghi 31'; Costa 49', 88' (pen.)	Stadium: Stadio Mario Rigamonti; Attendance: 2,663; Referee: Andrea De Marco

==== Quarter-finals ====
25 January 2006 First leg	Milan	1–0	Palermo	Milan
21:00 CET (UTC+01:00)	Gilardino 87'			Stadium: San Siro; Attendance: 2,105; Referee: Stefano Farina

31 January 2006 Second leg	Palermo	3–0 (3–1 agg.)	Milan	Palermo
21:00 CET (UTC+01:00)	González 10', 51'; Caracciolo 18'			Stadium: Stadio Renzo Barbera; Attendance: 10,739; Referee: Nicola Ayroldi

=== UEFA Champions League ===
==== Group stage ====
Pos	Team	Pld	W	D	L	GF	GA	GD	Pts	Qualification
1	(Italy) Milan	6	3	2	1	12	6	+6	11	Advance to knockout stage
2	(Netherlands) PSV Eindhoven	6	3	1	2	4	6	−2	10	Advance to knockout stage
3	(Germany) Schalke 04	6	2	2	2	12	9	+3	8	Transfer to UEFA Cup
4	(Turkey) Fenerbahçe	6	1	1	4	7	14	−7	4	

Source: RSSSF

13 September 2005 1	Milan (Italy)	3–1	(Turkey) Fenerbahçe	Milan, Italy
20:45 CEST (UTC+02:00)	Kaká 18', 87'; Shevchenko 89'	Report	Alex 63' (pen.); Demirel (yellow card) 77'	Stadium: San Siro; Attendance: 34,600; Referee: Mike Riley (England)

28 September 2005 2	Schalke 04 (Germany)	2–2	(Italy) Milan	Gelsenkirchen, Germany
20:45 CEST (UTC+02:00)	Larsen 3'; Altıntop 70'; Poulsen (yellow card) 82'	Report	Seedorf 1'; Shevchenko 59'; Kaká (yellow card) 73'	Stadium: Veltins-Arena; Attendance: 53,425; Referee: Claus Bo Larsen (Denmark)

19 October 2005 3	Milan (Italy)	0–0	(Netherlands) PSV Eindhoven	Milan, Italy
20:45 CEST (UTC+02:00)	Inzaghi (yellow card) 90+4'	Report	Reiziger (yellow card) 56'	Stadium: San Siro; Attendance: 35,000; Referee: Konrad Plautz (Austria)

1 November 2005 4	PSV Eindhoven (Netherlands)	1–0	(Italy) Milan	Eindhoven, Netherlands
20:45 CET (UTC+01:00)	Farfán 12'	Report	Gattuso (yellow card) 15'; Stam (yellow card) 45' (yellow-red card) 84'	Stadium: Philips Stadion; Attendance: 35,000; Referee: Graham Poll (England)

23 November 2005 5	Fenerbahçe (Turkey)	0–4	(Italy) Milan	Istanbul, Turkey
20:45 CET (UTC+01:00)	Barış (yellow card) 83'	Report	Shevchenko 16', 52', 70', 76'; Maldini (yellow card) 58'	Stadium: Şükrü Saracoğlu Stadium; Attendance: 40,000; Referee: Terje Hauge (Norway)

6 December 2005 6	Milan (Italy)	3–2	(Germany) Schalke 04	Milan, Italy
20:45 CET (UTC+01:00)	Pirlo 42', (yellow card) 56'; Kaká 52', 60'; Gattuso (yellow card) 59'	Report	Ernst (yellow card) 32'; Poulsen 44'; Kobiashvili (yellow card) 59'; Krstajić (yellow card) 63'; Lincoln 66'; Asamoah (yellow card) 86'; Rodríguez (yellow card) 90+1'	Stadium: San Siro; Attendance: 43,800; Referee: Manuel Mejuto González (Spain)

==== Knockout phase ====
===== Round of 16 =====
21 February 2006 First leg	Bayern Munich (Germany)	1–1	(Italy) Milan	Munich, Germany
20:45 CET (UTC+01:00)	Ballack 23'	Report	Shevchenko 58' (pen.); Seedorf (yellow card) 62'; Gattuso (yellow card) 76'	Stadium: Allianz Arena; Attendance: 66,000; Referee: Frank De Bleeckere (Belgium)

8 March 2006 Second leg	Milan (Italy)	4–1 (5–2 agg.)	(Germany) Bayern Munich	Milan, Italy
20:45 CET (UTC+01:00)	Inzaghi 8', 47'; Shevchenko 25'; Vogel (yellow card) 35'; Kaká 59'; Nesta (yellow card) 63'	Report	Ismaël 35'; Demichelis (yellow card) 39'; Sagnol (yellow card) 40'; Guerrero (yellow card) 76'	Stadium: San Siro; Attendance: 78,600; Referee: Valentin Ivanov (Russia)

===== Quarter-finals =====
29 March 2006 First leg	Lyon (France)	0–0	(Italy) Milan	Lyon, France
20:45 CEST (UTC+02:00)	Tiago (yellow card) 90+3'	Report	Costacurta (yellow card) 58'	Stadium: Stade de Gerland; Attendance: 39,300; Referee: Konrad Plautz (Austria)

4 April 2006 Second leg	Milan (Italy)	3–1 (3–1 agg.)	(France) Lyon	Milan, Italy
20:45 CEST (UTC+02:00)	Inzaghi 25', 88', (yellow card) 45'; Gattuso (yellow card) 27'; Serginho (yellow card) 90'; Maldini (yellow card) 90+1'; Shevchenko 90+3'	Report	Diarra 31'	Stadium: San Siro; Attendance: 78,900; Referee: Terje Hauge (Norway)

===== Semi-finals =====
18 April 2006 First leg	Milan (Italy)	0–1	(Spain) Barcelona	Milan, Italy
20:45 CEST (UTC+02:00)	Nesta (yellow card) 82'	Report	Puyol (yellow card) 34'; Giuly 57'; Oleguer (yellow card) 74'	Stadium: San Siro; Attendance: 76,900; Referee: Alain Sars (France)

26 April 2006 Second leg	Barcelona (Spain)	0–0 (1–0 agg.)	(Italy) Milan	Barcelona, Spain
20:45 CEST (UTC+02:00)	Edmílson (yellow card) 90'	Report	Costacurta (yellow card) 44'	Stadium: Camp Nou; Attendance: 99,255; Referee: Markus Merk (Germany)

== Statistics ==
=== Appearances and goals ===
As of 30 June 2006

No.	Pos	Nat	Player	Total		Serie A		Coppa Italia		Champions League	
No.	Pos	Nat	Player	Apps	Goals	Apps	Goals	Apps	Goals	Apps	Goals
1	GK	(Brazil) BRA	Dida	48	-41	36	-31	0	0	12	-10
31	DF	(Netherlands) NED	Stam	37	1	24+1	1	2+1	0	8+1	0
13	DF	(Italy) ITA	Nesta	42	1	29+1	1	2	0	10	0
4	DF	(Georgia (country)) GEO	Kaladze	43	2	26+2	2	4	0	10+1	0
27	DF	(Brazil) BRA	Serginho	46	0	29+4	0	0+2	0	8+3	0
8	MF	(Italy) ITA	Gattuso	49	3	31+4	3	3	0	11	0
21	MF	(Italy) ITA	Pirlo	49	5	31+2	4	0+4	0	12	1
20	MF	(Netherlands) NED	Seedorf	49	6	31+5	4	2	1	11	1
22	MF	(Brazil) BRA	Kaká	49	19	28+7	14	1+1	0	12	5
7	FW	(Ukraine) UKR	Shevchenko	40	28	27+1	19	0	0	11+1	9
11	FW	(Italy) ITA	Gilardino	47	19	29+5	17	3	2	6+4	0
16	GK	(Australia) AUS	Kalac	7	0	2	0	4	0	0+1	0
9	FW	(Italy) ITA	Inzaghi	31	17	16+7	12	1+1	1	4+2	4
3	DF	(Italy) ITA	Maldini	23	2	13+1	2	0	0	6+3	0
10	MF	(Portugal) POR	Rui Costa	29	0	12+13	0	0	0	0+4	0
2	DF	(Brazil) BRA	Cafu	25	1	11+8	1	1	0	3+2	0
14	DF	(Croatia) CRO	Simic	21	0	10+5	0	4	0	1+1	0
14	MF	(Switzerland) SUI	Vogel	21	0	9+5	0	3	0	0+4	0
5	DF	(Italy) ITA	Costacurta	21	0	8+7	0	3	0	2+1	0
18	DF	(Czech Republic) CZE	Jankulovski	28	1	7+15	1	4	0	0+2	0
23	MF	(Italy) ITA	Ambrosini	18	1	5+8	1	1	0	1+3	0
32	FW	(Italy) ITA	Vieri	14	2	3+5	1	1	1	3+2	0
37	FW	(Brazil) BRA	Amoroso	5	1	1+3	1	1	0	0	0
46	DF	(Italy) ITA	Marzoratti	2	0	0	0	1+1	0	0	0
41	FW	(Italy) ITA	Ardemagni	1	0	0	0	0+1	0	0	0
	GK	(Italy) ITA	Favaretto	0	0	0	0				

Last updated: 31 June 2006
Source: Competitions

=== Top scorers ===
==== Serie A ====
- (Ukraine) Andriy Shevchenko 19 (5 pen.)
- (Italy) Alberto Gilardino 17 (1 pen.)
- (Brazil) Kaká 14 (3 pen.)
- (Italy) Filippo Inzaghi 12
- (Netherlands) Clarence Seedorf 4
