= 2005–06 FC Bayern Munich season =

106th season in existence of Bayern Munich

Bayern Munich
2005–06 season
- Manager: Felix Magath
- Stadium: Allianz Arena
- Bundesliga: 1st
- DFB-Pokal: Winners
- UEFA Champions League: Round of 16
- DFB-Ligapokal: Semi-finals
- Top goalscorer: League: Roy Makaay (17); All: Roy Makaay (19)
Home colours	Away colours	Third colours

FC Bayern Munich won the domestic double, beating Werder Bremen by five points in Bundesliga, and defeating Eintracht Frankfurt 1–0 in the DFB-Pokal final, thanks to a goal from Claudio Pizarro. The season was in spite of that tainted due to a big defeat to Milan in the UEFA Champions League, losing out 5–2 on aggregate in the Last 16. At the end of the season, Bayern signed German football's wonderkid Lukas Podolski from Köln. This was the club's first season at the Allianz Arena.

== Squad ==
=== Goalkeepers ===
- (Germany) Oliver Kahn
- (Germany) Michael Rensing
- (Germany) Bernd Dreher

=== Defenders ===
- (France) Willy Sagnol
- (Brazil) (Portugal) Lúcio
- (Argentina) (Italy) Martín Demichelis
- (Germany) Andreas Görlitz
- (Germany) Philipp Lahm
- (France) Valérien Ismaël
- (France) Bixente Lizarazu

=== Midfielders ===
- (Germany) Mehmet Scholl
- (Iran) Ali Karimi
- (Brazil) Zé Roberto
- (Germany) Michael Ballack
- (Germany) Jens Jeremies
- (Paraguay) (Spain) Julio dos Santos
- (Bosnia and Herzegovina) (Germany) Hasan Salihamidžić
- (England) (Canada) Owen Hargreaves
- (Germany) Bastian Schweinsteiger
- (Germany) Sebastian Deisler
- (Germany) Andreas Ottl

=== Attackers ===
- (Netherlands) Roy Makaay
- (Peru) (Italy) Claudio Pizarro
- (Paraguay) (Spain) Roque Santa Cruz
- (Peru) Paolo Guerrero

== Competitions ==
Win Draw Loss Postponed

=== Overall record ===
Competition	First match	Last match	Starting round	Final position	Record							
Competition	First match	Last match	Starting round	Final position	Pld	W	D	L	GF	GA	GD	Win %
Bundesliga	5 August 2005	13 May 2006	Matchday 1	Winners	34	22	9	3	67	32	+35	64.71
DFB-Pokal	21 August 2005	29 April 2006	First round	Winners	6	6	0	0	13	2	+11	100.00
Champions League	14 September 2005	8 March 2006	Group stage	Round of 16	8	4	2	2	12	9	+3	50.00
DFB-Pokal	26 July 2005	26 July 2005	Semi-final	Semi-final	1	0	0	1	1	2	−1	0.00
Total					49	32	11	6	93	45	+48	65.31

Source: Competitions

=== Bundesliga ===
==== Matches ====
1	Bayern Munich	3–0	Mönchengladbach
	Hargreaves 28'; Makaay 86', 89'

2	Bayer Leverkusen	2–5	Bayern Munich
	Berbatov 32'; Babić 79'		Ballack 3'; Makaay 11', 53', 56'; Karimi 35'

3	Bayern Munich	3–0	Hertha BSC
	Ballack 47'; Scholl 85'; Makaay 87'

4	Nürnberg	1–2	Bayern Munich
	Pinola 20'		Guerrero 21'; Ballack 60'

5	Bayern Munich	1–0	Hannover
	Demichelis 9'

6	Eintracht Frankfurt	0–1	Bayern Munich
			Guerrero 72'

7	Hamburg	2–0	Bayern Munich
	van der Vaart 10'; Trochowski 62'

8	Bayern Munich	2–0	Wolfsburg
	Santa Cruz 67'; Lúcio 90'

9	Schalke 04	1–1	Bayern Munich
	Larsen 90' (pen.)		Santa Cruz 18'

10	Bayern Munich	4–0	Duisburg
	Ballack 27'; Zé Roberto 33'; Santa Cruz 59'; Pizarro 90'

11	Köln	1–2	Bayern Munich
	Scherz 28'		Lúcio 55'; Ballack 74'

12	Bayern Munich	3–1	Werder Bremen
	Schweinsteiger 3'; Pizarro 35'; Makaay 44'		Klose 1'

13	Arminia Bielefeld	1–2	Bayern Munich
	Boakye 60'		Pizarro 82', 90'

14	Bayern Munich	2–1	Mainz
	Pizarro 29', 54'		Auer 34'

15	Stuttgart	0–0	Bayern Munich

16	Bayern Munich	2–1	Kaiserslautern
	Ballack 26'; Makaay 54' (pen.)		Sanogo 39'

17	Borussia Dortmund	1–2	Bayern Munich
	Kringe 79'		Karimi 53'; Pizarro 73'

18	Mönchengladbach	1–3	Bayern Munich
	Sonck 56'		Makaay 13', 69'; Ballack 55'

19	Bayern Munich	1–0	Bayer Leverkusen
	Ballack 36'

20	Hertha BSC	0–0	Bayern Munich

21	Bayern Munich	2–1	Nürnberg
	Makaay 28'; Ballack 54'		Vittek 35'

22	Hannover	1–1	Bayern Munich
	Brdarić 56'		Ballack 89'

23	Bayern Munich	5–2	Eintracht Frankfurt
	Guerrero 21', 42'; Ballack 33', 62'; Pizarro 85'		Preuß 32'; Meier 84'

24	Bayern Munich	1–2	Hamburg
	Scholl 83'		Demel 17' de Jong 88'

25	Wolfsburg	0–0	Bayern Munich

26	Bayern Munich	3–0	Schalke 04
	Salihamidžić 49'; Pizarro 56'; Makaay 89'

27	Duisburg	1–3	Bayern Munich
	Ahanfouf 40' (pen.)		Salihamidžić 66'; Makaay 71'; Pizarro 80'

28	Bayern Munich	2–2	Köln
	Sagnol 29'; Makaay 39'		Feulner 12'; Streit 36'

29	Werder Bremen	3–0	Bayern Munich
	Schweinsteiger 33' (o.g.); Jensen 79'; Borowski 83'

30	Bayern Munich	2–0	Arminia Bielefeld
	Ballack 69'; Scholl 74'

31	Mainz	2–2	Bayern Munich
	Zidan 9'; M. Friedrich 13'		Makaay 29', 37' (pen.)

32	Bayern Munich	3–1	Stuttgart
	Santa Cruz 11'; Pizarro 43'; Schweinsteiger 46'		Ljuboja 6'

33	Kaiserslautern	1–1	Bayern Munich
	Halil Altıntop 26'		Ottl 68'

34	Bayern Munich	3–3	Borussia Dortmund
	Makaay 6'; Schweinsteiger 48'; Ballack 50'		Koller 2', 76'; Degen 64'

=== Top Scorers ===
- (Netherlands) Roy Makaay 17 (2)
- (Germany) Michael Ballack 14
- (Peru) Claudio Pizarro 11
- (Paraguay) Roque Santa Cruz 4
- (Peru) Paolo Guerrero 4
- (Germany) Bastian Schweinsteiger 3
- (Germany) Mehmet Scholl 3

=== DFB-Pokal ===
==== Matches ====
21 August 2005 Round 1	MSV 1919 Neuruppin	0–4	Bayern Munich
			Ismaël 9'; Scholl 50', 86'; Ottl 69'

26 October 2005 Round 2	Erzgebirge Aue	0–1	Bayern Munich
			Ballack 80'

21 December 2005 Round of 16	Bayern Munich	1–0 (a.e.t.)	Hamburger SV
	Hargreaves 113'

24 January 2006 Quarter-finals	Bayern Munich	3–2 (a.e.t.)	Mainz 05
	Pizarro 81', 115'; Guerrero 94'		Zidan 21' (pen.); Ruman 106'

12 April 2006 Semi-finals	FC St. Pauli	0–3	Bayern Munich
			Hargreaves 15'; Pizarro 84', 89'

29 April 2006 Final	Eintracht Frankfurt	0–1	Bayern Munich
			Pizarro 59'

=== Champions League ===
==== Group stage ====
Pos	Team	Pld	W	D	L	GF	GA	GD	Pts	Qualification	JUV	BAY	BRU	RWI
1	(Italy) Juventus	6	5	0	1	12	5	+7	15	Advance to knockout stage	—	2–1	1–0	3–0
2	(Germany) Bayern Munich	6	4	1	1	10	4	+6	13	Advance to knockout stage	2–1	—	1–0	4–0
3	(Belgium) Club Brugge	6	2	1	3	6	7	−1	7	Transfer to UEFA Cup	1–2	1–1	—	3–2
4	(Austria) Rapid Wien	6	0	0	6	3	15	−12	0		1–3	0–1	0–1	—

Source: RSSSF

14 September 2005 1	Rapid Wien (Austria)	0–1	(Germany) Bayern Munich	Ernst-Happel-Stadion, Vienna
20:45		Report	Guerrero 60'	Attendance: 47,540; Referee: Alain Sars (France)

27 September 2005 2	Bayern Munich (Germany)	1–0	(Belgium) Club Brugge	Allianz Arena, Munich
20:45	Demichelis 32'	Report		Attendance: 66,000; Referee: Tom Henning Øvrebø (Norway)

18 October 2005 3	Bayern Munich (Germany)	2–1	(Italy) Juventus	Allianz Arena, Munich
20:45	Deisler 32'; Demichelis 39'	Report	Ibrahimović 90'	Attendance: 66,000; Referee: Kyros Vassaras (Greece)

2 November 2005 4	Juventus (Italy)	2–1	(Germany) Bayern Munich	Stadio delle Alpi, Turin
20:45	Trezeguet 62', 85'	Report	Deisler 66'	Attendance: 16,076; Referee: Ľuboš Micheľ (Slovakia)

22 November 2005 5	Bayern Munich (Germany)	4–0	(Austria) Rapid Wien	Allianz Arena, Munich
20:45	Deisler 21'; Karimi 54'; Makaay 72', 77'	Report		Attendance: 66,000; Referee: Arturo Daudén Ibáñez (Spain)

7 December 2005 6	Club Brugge (Belgium)	1–1	(Germany) Bayern Munich	Jan Breydel Stadium, Bruges
20:45	Portillo 32'	Report	Pizarro 21'	Attendance: 27,860; Referee: Laurent Duhamel (France)

==== Knockout stage ====
===== Round of 16 =====
21 February 2006 First leg	Bayern Munich (Germany)	1–1	(Italy) Milan	Allianz Arena, Munich
20:45	Ballack 23'	Report	Shevchenko 58' (pen.)	Attendance: 66,000; Referee: Frank De Bleeckere (Belgium)

8 March 2006 Second leg	Milan (Italy)	4–1	(Germany) Bayern Munich	San Siro, Milan
20:45	Inzaghi 8', 47'; Shevchenko 25'; Kaká 59'	Report	Ismaël 35'	Attendance: 78,577; Referee: Valentin Ivanov (Russia)
