= Eliteserien referees =

Norwegian football league referees

The Eliteserien referees is a group of professional or semi-professional football referees and assistant referees, appointed by Dommerkomitéen, the Norwegian referees' committee.

== Eliteserien Match Officials ==
The 2021 Eliteserien match officials lists, consists of 14 referees and 24 assistant referees.

=== Referees ===
- Sivert Amland
- Usman Aslam
- Espen Eskås
- Marius Hansen Grøtta
- Dag Vidar Hafsås
- Tom Harald Hagen
- Kristoffer Hagenes
- Tore Hansen
- Sigurd Kringstad
- Svein Oddvar Moen
- Ola Hobber Nilsen
- Rohit Saggi
- Tommy Skjerven
- Kai Erik Steen

Eskås, Hagenes, Hansen, Kringstad, Moen, Saggi and Steen are also FIFA International Referees.

Hafsås, Hagen, Nilsen and Skjerven were all previously FIFA International Referees.

=== Assistant Referees ===
- Ivar Askeland
- Isaak Bashevkin
- Sondre Dahle
- Anders Olav Dale
- Jim Dyb
- Jan Erik Engan
- Tom Harald Grønevik
- Kristoffer Gullhav
- Kim Tomas Haglund
- Eivin Hansen
- Ole Haukåsen
- Geir Oskar Isaksen
- Ivar M. Jahr
- Morten Jensen
- Kim Andre Johnsen
- Christer Jørgensen
- Jon-Michael Knutsen
- Runar Langseth
- Magnus Lundberg
- Dag Roger Nebben
- Alf Olav Rossland
- Jørgen Valstadsve
- Anders Velo
- Øystein Ytterland

Bashevkin, Dale, Engan, Grønevik, Haglund, Isaksen, Jensen, Knutsen, Langseth and Ytterland are also FIFA International Assistant Referees.

Johnsen, Lundberg and Nebben were all previously FIFA International Assistant Referees.

=== Notable International Appointments ===
Current and former Eliteserien match officials have overseen some of the most prestigious matches available, these include:

- 2006 UEFA Champions League Final

Refereed by Terje Hauge, and assisted by Steinar Holvik and Arild Sundet.

- 2008–09 UEFA Champions League Semi-final second leg (Chelsea v. Barcelona)

Refereed by Tom Henning Øvrebø, and assisted by Geir Åge Holen and Dag Roger Nebben.

- 2011 FIFA U-17 World Cup Final

Refereed by Svein Oddvar Moen and assisted by Kim Tomas Haglund and Erwin Zeinstra (Netherlands).

== Notable former Eliteserien Referees ==
Name	Year from—to	FIFA list	Notes
Kjell Alseth	1996—2008	2002	Retired
Espen Berntsen	1997—2015	2002—2012	Retired
Terje Hauge	1990—2010	1993—2010	Retired and became Head of Referees
Roy Helge Olsen	1987—2011	1992—2002	Retired
Tom Henning Øvrebø	1992—2013	1994—2010	Retired
Rune Pedersen	1987—2003	1989—2003	Retired and became Head of Referees
Brage Sandmoen	2001—2015	2003—2010	Retired
