= 2006 UEFA Champions League final =

Association football match

- Event: 2005–06 UEFA Champions League
| Barcelona | Arsenal |
| (Spain) | (England) |
| 2 | 1 |
- Date: 17 May 2006
- Venue: Stade de France, Saint-Denis
- Man of the Match: Samuel Eto'o (Barcelona)
- Referee: Terje Hauge (Norway)
- Attendance: 79,610
- Weather: Partly cloudy 15 °C (59 °F); 33% humidity

The 2006 UEFA Champions League final was an association football match between Barcelona of Spain and Arsenal of England at the Stade de France in Saint-Denis, Paris, France, on Wednesday, 17 May 2006. It was the final match of the 2005–06 season of Europe's primary cup competition, the UEFA Champions League. Barcelona were appearing in their fifth final, having won the competition once in 1992, while it was Arsenal's first final appearance and the first appearance by a club from London.

Each club progressed through the group stage and three knockout rounds to reach the final, playing 12 matches in total. Barcelona won their group and progressed to the final after beating Chelsea, Benfica and Milan, respectively. Arsenal won their group to move into the knockout stage, and progressed without conceding a goal against Real Madrid, Juventus and Villarreal, respectively.

A crowd of 79,500 watched as Jens Lehmann was sent off early in the game. Despite this setback, Arsenal took the lead through Sol Campbell towards the end of the first half. After an hour, Henrik Larsson came on for Barcelona and was involved in both of their goals. Barcelona equalised through Samuel Eto'o near the end of the second half, and a few minutes later, Juliano Belletti scored to give Barcelona a 2–1 victory.

== Background ==
It was the first time Arsenal had appeared in the European Cup final, which also made them the first club from London to do so. Arsenal's appearance in the match came six years to the day since their last European final, when they faced Galatasaray in the 2000 UEFA Cup final; they lost on penalties after the match had finished goalless after extra time. Of the players who featured in that final, only Thierry Henry and Dennis Bergkamp remained at the club, while Sylvinho, who had featured for Arsenal in the final, was now a Barcelona player. Barcelona were appearing in the final for the fifth time; their last appearance was a 4–0 loss to Milan in 1994. Two more losses preceded the 1994 final (1961 and 1986), and their only success in the competition came in 1992 when they beat Sampdoria. Barcelona went into the final as domestic league champions, having won La Liga a fortnight earlier. They were regarded as the best side on the continent because they possessed players such as Ronaldinho and Samuel Eto'o. Barcelona player Deco dismissed the notion of Barcelona being favourites, insisting they would not be complacent: "Milan were winning 3–0 last year against Liverpool and ended up losing in the end. We need to be serious, calm and fully concentrated so that we don't make any errors".

Neither side had been beaten en route to the final, with Arsenal only conceding two goals in their 12 matches before the final, including ten successive matches without conceding. This set the record for the longest time without a conceding a goal, having played 919 minutes since conceding against Ajax in the group stage. Barcelona, on the other hand, had scored 114 goals in all competitions before the final. The two finalists were guaranteed a financial windfall from their progress to the final. Arsenal would receive a revenue of around €37.3 million if they won and approximately €34.7 million if they lost. Barcelona would earn €31.5 million from revenue if they won, and around €28.9 million if they were to lose. Included in the total for participating in the final, the UEFA Champions League winners would collect approximately €6.4 million, with the runners-up receiving approximately €3.8 million. The final marked the appearance of a new trophy following Liverpool's triumph over Milan the previous year. As Liverpool won the competition for the fifth time they were entitled to keep the trophy, creating the need for a new one.

== Venue ==
UEFA awarded the right to host the final to the Stade de France in Saint-Denis after considering its merits in terms of capacity, stadium infrastructure and dossiers including city and airport agreements and promotional plans. UEFA also conducted a variety of site visits. The Stade de France had previously staged the 2000 UEFA Champions League final between Real Madrid and Valencia, which Madrid won 3–0. Saint-Denis was chosen to host the final in recognition of the 50th anniversary of the first European Cup final in 1956, held in nearby Paris at the Parc des Princes, now home of Paris Saint-Germain. The Parc des Princes also hosted the 1975 and 1981 European Cup finals, the 1978 and 1995 UEFA Cup Winners' Cup finals, and the 1998 UEFA Cup final.

== Route to the final ==
Teams qualified for the Champions League group stage, either directly or through three preliminary rounds, based on both their position in the preceding domestic league and the strength of that league. Both Arsenal and Barcelona entered the competition in the group stages: Arsenal by finishing second in the 2004–05 FA Premier League, and Barcelona by winning La Liga. The group stages were contested as eight double round robin groups of four teams, with the top two qualifying for the knockout stage. Knockout matches were decided based on home and away matches, with the away goals rule, extra time and penalty shootouts as tiebreakers if needed.

| (Spain) Barcelona | | | | Round | (England) Arsenal | | | |
|---|---|---|---|---|---|---|---|---|
| Opponent | Result | | | Group stage | Opponent | Result | | |
| (Germany) Werder Bremen | 2–0 (A) | | | Matchday 1 | (Switzerland) Thun | 2–1 (H) | | |
| (Italy) Udinese | 4–1 (H) | | | Matchday 2 | (Netherlands) Ajax | 2–1 (A) | | |
| (Greece) Panathinaikos | 0–0 (A) | | | Matchday 3 | (Czech Republic) Sparta Prague | 2–0 (A) | | |
| (Greece) Panathinaikos | 5–0 (H) | | | Matchday 4 | (Czech Republic) Sparta Prague | 3–0 (H) | | |
| (Germany) Werder Bremen | 3–1 (H) | | | Matchday 5 | (Switzerland) Thun | 1–0 (A) | | |
| (Italy) Udinese | 2–0 (A) | | | Matchday 6 | (Netherlands) Ajax | 0–0 (H) | | |
| Group C winner: Pos / Team / Pld / Pts; 1 / (Spain) Barcelona / 6 / 16; 2 / (Germany) Werder Bremen / 6 / 7; 3 / (Italy) Udinese / 6 / 7; 4 / (Greece) Panathinaikos / 6 / 4; Source: RSSSF | | | | Final standings | Group B winner: Pos / Team / Pld / Pts; 1 / (England) Arsenal / 6 / 16; 2 / (Netherlands) Ajax / 6 / 11; 3 / (Switzerland) Thun / 6 / 4; 4 / (Czech Republic) Sparta Prague / 6 / 2; Source: RSSSF | | | |
| Opponent | Agg. | 1st leg | 2nd leg | Knockout stage | Opponent | Agg. | 1st leg | 2nd leg |
| (England) Chelsea | 3–2 | 2–1 (A) | 1–1 (H) | First knockout round | (Spain) Real Madrid | 1–0 | 1–0 (A) | 0–0 (H) |
| (Portugal) Benfica | 2–0 | 0–0 (A) | 2–0 (H) | Quarter-finals | (Italy) Juventus | 2–0 | 2–0 (H) | 0–0 (A) |
| (Italy) Milan | 1–0 | 1–0 (A) | 0–0 (H) | Semi-finals | (Spain) Villarreal | 1–0 | 1–0 (H) | 0–0 (A) |

== Pre-match ==
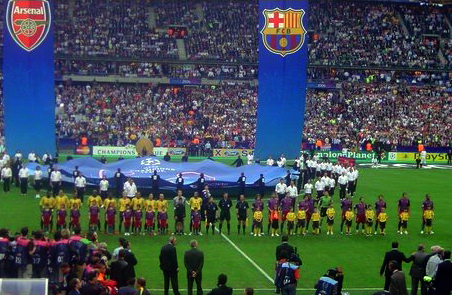
The two teams line up before kick off

=== Related events ===
Barcelona showed the match live from their Mini Estadi on a 70-metre (230 ft) television screen for an estimated audience of 15,276. Before the final, an estimated 1.2 million people descended into the streets of Barcelona, as the team toured the city on two open-top double-decker buses to celebrate winning La Liga.

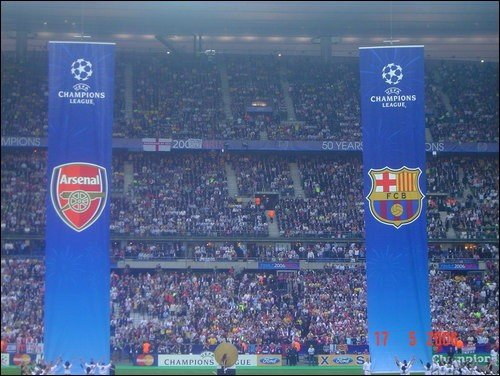
The team flags hoisted above the pitch before the kick-off

=== Officials ===
On the morning of the final it emerged that the assistant referee for the game Ole Hermann Borgan had posed for photographs in a Barcelona shirt for Drammens Tidende, a Norwegian newspaper. After initially sticking by the official, UEFA eventually decided to replace him with fellow Norwegian Arild Sundet. Norway's head of refereeing Rune Pedersen stated: "It is an unwritten rule that referees should not do anything that can doubt their impartial stance".

=== Team selection ===
Barcelona were expected to line up in a 4–2–3–1 formation, with Ronaldinho, Ludovic Giuly and Deco supporting Samuel Eto'o who would be deployed as the lone striker. They had doubts about the fitness of Lionel Messi going into the final. He had pulled a thigh muscle during the second leg of their match with Chelsea, and had not played since, though he was included in the 22-man squad for the final. Barcelona coach Frank Rijkaard stated he would leave it late before deciding whether to select him. Despite being included in the squad, Messi did not feature in the final. Arsenal were expected to line up in a 4–5–1 formation, with Thierry Henry as the sole striker. There was much discussion about whether José Antonio Reyes would take the place of Robert Pires on the left of midfield. It had been announced before the match that this would be Pires' last match as he had agreed to join Villarreal next season.

Ultimately, Barcelona fielded a 4–3–3 formation with Mark van Bommel and Edmílson lining up in midfield alongside Deco, ahead of Xavi and Andrés Iniesta. Lionel Messi did not feature in the matchday squad, despite returning from injury and featuring in the 22-man squad, while Henrik Larsson was among the substitutes in potentially his last game for the club. Arsenal fielded a 4–4–1–1 formation, which saw Emmanuel Eboué replace the injured Lauren, and Ashley Cole return at left-back to make only his third appearance in the competition that season due to injury. Thierry Henry was deployed as the lone striker, with Freddie Ljungberg playing off his shoulder.

== Match ==
=== Summary ===
==== First half ====
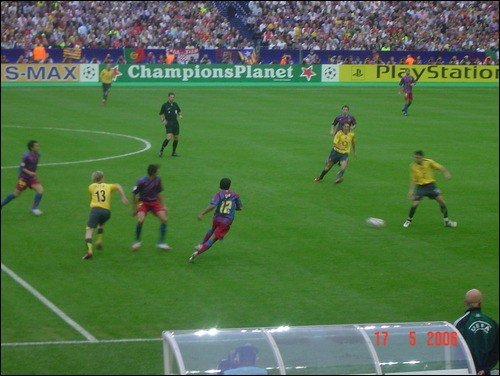
Play during the first half

As both teams' first-choice kits featured a shade of red, Arsenal wore their yellow away strip, while Barcelona wore their traditional blue and maroon striped kit. Arsenal won the coin toss and Barcelona kicked off. Barcelona almost immediately came under pressure when Thierry Henry shot straight at Barcelona goalkeeper Víctor Valdés, who conceded a corner. From the resulting corner Arsenal had another chance again courtesy of Henry, whose shot was again saved by Valdés. The next attack in the seventh minute resulted in Arsenal goalkeeper Jens Lehmann saving from Ludovic Giuly after he shot from a narrow angle. Four minutes later Barcelona were awarded a free-kick 35 yards from goal; Ronaldinho shot wide of the goal.

With 18 minutes played, Lehmann became the first player to be sent off in a European Cup final after he brought down Samuel Eto'o outside the Arsenal box. Giuly subsequently put the ball in the back of the net, but the goal was not allowed due to the foul. Arsenal substituted Robert Pires for Manuel Almunia, their substitute goalkeeper. The free-kick was sent wide by Ronaldinho. Following Lehmann's dismissal Barcelona exerted more pressure on Arsenal, to the point where Emmanuel Eboué was cautioned for a high tackle.

In the 37th minute Arsenal overcame their numerical disadvantage to score when Sol Campbell headed in from a Thierry Henry free-kick following Carles Puyol's foul on Emmanuel Eboué. Some believed that Eboué was guilty of diving. Arsenal held onto their lead for the remainder of the half. Barcelona's best chance came from Eto'o, whose shot hit the post via a save from Almunia.

==== Second half ====
At half-time, Barcelona replaced Edmílson, who had picked up an injury in the first half, with Andrés Iniesta. Almunia saved a shot from Iniesta six minutes into the half.

After 61 minutes, Barcelona substituted Van Bommel for Larsson. Minutes later, Alexander Hleb received a pass from Henry but shot wide of the goal. Arsenal began to press forward and both Henry and Ljungberg saw shots saved; Henry then had another chance to score on the counter after being put through by Hleb, but his scuffed shot was straight at Valdés. Following this attack, Oleguer was replaced by Juliano Belletti, and Arsenal replaced Cesc Fàbregas with Mathieu Flamini.

Next, Iniesta sent a pass through the inside-left channel to Larsson whose one-touch, right-footed lay-off quickly released Eto'o to equalise for Barcelona. Four minutes later, Larsson was again the provider, playing a one-two with Belletti in the inside-right channel, before the Brazilian full-back shot right-footed through Almunia's legs to score at the near post.

The remaining minutes saw Arsenal replace Hleb with Reyes in an attempt to equalise, but Barcelona had the best chance during this period, only for Giuly to hit his shot straight at Almunia. Following this, Larsson impeded the Arsenal goalkeeper and was cautioned. The match finished soon after with Barcelona winning 2–1. With this defeat, Arsenal became the first English club and third overall – after Hamburger SV and Fiorentina – to have been runner-up in all three major European competitions (European Champion Clubs' Cup/UEFA Champions League, UEFA Cup/UEFA Europa League, and the now-defunct Cup Winners' Cup).

=== Details ===
17 May 2006
20:45 UTC+2

| Barcelona (Spain) | 2–1 | (England) Arsenal |
|---|---|---|
| Eto'o 76'; Belletti 80' | Report | Campbell 37' |

Stade de France, Saint-Denis
Attendance: 79,610
Referee: Terje Hauge (Norway)

| Barcelona | Arsenal |

| GK | 1 | (Spain) Víctor Valdés |
| RB | 23 | (Spain) Oleguer | (yellow card) 69' | (substituted off) 71' |
| CB | 4 | (Mexico) Rafael Márquez |
| CB | 5 | (Spain) Carles Puyol (c) |
| LB | 12 | (Netherlands) Giovanni van Bronckhorst |
| DM | 15 | (Brazil) Edmílson | | (substituted off) 46' |
| CM | 20 | (Portugal) Deco |
| CM | 17 | (Netherlands) Mark van Bommel | | (substituted off) 61' |
| RW | 8 | (France) Ludovic Giuly |
| LW | 10 | (Brazil) Ronaldinho |
| CF | 9 | (Cameroon) Samuel Eto'o |
Substitutes:
| GK | 25 | (Spain) Albert Jorquera |
| DF | 2 | (Brazil) Juliano Belletti | | (substituted on) 71' |
| DF | 16 | (Brazil) Sylvinho |
| MF | 3 | (Brazil) Thiago Motta |
| MF | 6 | (Spain) Xavi |
| MF | 24 | (Spain) Andrés Iniesta | | (substituted on) 46' |
| FW | 7 | (Sweden) Henrik Larsson | (yellow card) 90+3' | (substituted on) 61' |
Manager:
(Netherlands) Frank Rijkaard

| GK | 1 | (Germany) Jens Lehmann | (red card) 18' |
| RB | 27 | (Ivory Coast) Emmanuel Eboué | (yellow card) 22' |
| CB | 28 | (Ivory Coast) Kolo Touré |
| CB | 23 | (England) Sol Campbell |
| LB | 3 | (England) Ashley Cole |
| RM | 7 | (France) Robert Pires | | (substituted off) 18' |
| CM | 19 | (Brazil) Gilberto Silva |
| CM | 15 | (Spain) Cesc Fàbregas | | (substituted off) 74' |
| LM | 13 | (Belarus) Alexander Hleb | | (substituted off) 85' |
| SS | 8 | (Sweden) Freddie Ljungberg |
| CF | 14 | (France) Thierry Henry (c) | (yellow card) 51' |
Substitutes:
| GK | 24 | (Spain) Manuel Almunia | | (substituted on) 18' |
| DF | 20 | (Switzerland) Philippe Senderos |
| DF | 22 | (France) Gaël Clichy |
| MF | 16 | (France) Mathieu Flamini | | (substituted on) 74' |
| FW | 9 | (Spain) José Antonio Reyes | | (substituted on) 85' |
| FW | 10 | (Netherlands) Dennis Bergkamp |
| FW | 11 | (Netherlands) Robin van Persie |
Manager:
(France) Arsène Wenger

Man of the Match:
Samuel Eto'o (Barcelona)

Assistant referees:
Steinar Holvik (Norway)
Arild Sundet (Norway)
Fourth official:
Tom Henning Øvrebø (Norway)

=== Statistics ===
First half
| Statistic | Barcelona | Arsenal |
|---|---|---|
| Goals scored | 0 | 1 |
| Total shots | 8 | 4 |
| Shots on target | 3 | 3 |
| Saves | 2 | 3 |
| Ball possession | 59% | 41% |
| Corner kicks | 1 | 1 |
| Fouls committed | 10 | 7 |
| Offsides | 0 | 0 |
| Yellow cards | 0 | 1 |
| Red cards | 0 | 1 |

Second half
| Statistic | Barcelona | Arsenal |
|---|---|---|
| Goals scored | 2 | 0 |
| Total shots | 12 | 4 |
| Shots on target | 6 | 2 |
| Saves | 2 | 4 |
| Ball possession | 69% | 31% |
| Corner kicks | 2 | 3 |
| Fouls committed | 10 | 9 |
| Offsides | 1 | 1 |
| Yellow cards | 2 | 1 |
| Red cards | 0 | 0 |

Overall
| Statistic | Barcelona | Arsenal |
|---|---|---|
| Goals scored | 2 | 1 |
| Total shots | 20 | 8 |
| Shots on target | 9 | 5 |
| Saves | 4 | 7 |
| Ball possession | 64% | 36% |
| Corner kicks | 3 | 4 |
| Fouls committed | 20 | 16 |
| Offsides | 1 | 1 |
| Yellow cards | 2 | 2 |
| Red cards | 0 | 1 |

== Post-match ==
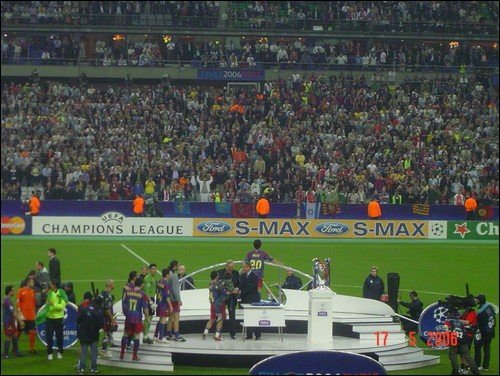
The Barcelona players receiving their medals

Barcelona captain Carles Puyol collected the trophy from UEFA president Lennart Johansson as Barcelona celebrated their second European Cup triumph.

Much of the discussion after the match centred around referee Terje Hauge's decision to send off Lehmann. Football pundit Mark Lawrenson stated: "The game changed when Arsenal goalkeeper Jens Lehmann was sent off". Arsenal manager Arsène Wenger agreed: "When Jens Lehmann got sent off, that left us with 70 minutes to play with ten against eleven, against a team that retains the ball very well". He refused to openly criticise this decision, although he did criticise the decision to award Barcelona's first goal, as he felt that Samuel Eto'o was offside. Wenger was also adamant that his young side would bounce back from the defeat. One person who did criticise the referee was Thierry Henry, stating: "I was kicked all over the place. I expected the referee to do his job. I don't think he did". There was much discussion after the match over whether Henry would remain with Arsenal or move to Barcelona, whom he had been linked with a move to over the past months. Arsène Wenger was asked post match if Henry would leave, to which the Arsenal manager replied: "I don't know. I don't think so". However, on 19 May, Henry signed a new four-year contract with Arsenal, ending the speculation about a possible move to Barcelona.

Henrik Larsson, who provided the two assists for the goals, was delighted with the triumph and had no regrets over deciding to leave Barcelona after the match: "I want to play football. I feel I haven't played as much as I would love to because of the great players we have at Barcelona". Fellow Barcelona player Giovanni van Bronckhorst was emotional as he won against his former club: "It's special to win the final, and even more special to do it against your old team". Samuel Eto'o, scorer of Barcelona's first goal, cited Liverpool's comeback against Milan as inspiration for Barcelona's victory: "After having seen what Liverpool did last year, we told ourselves not to throw in the towel. We followed Liverpool's example". Barcelona manager Frank Rijkaard praised the role of goalkeeper Victor Valdés in their victory, stating that he made a number of important saves to keep them in the match: "Valdes played a decisive role. He saved us at crucial moments". Talking to FourFourTwo in 2017, Deco regarded Henry missing a chance to make it 2–0 to Arsenal when through one-on-one with Valdés with just over 20 minutes remaining as being a decisive moment in the game.

Thierry Henry paid tribute to Larsson's contribution to Barcelona's win after the game, saying, "People always talk about Ronaldinho, Eto'o, Giuly and everything, but I didn't see them today, I saw Henrik Larsson. He came on, he changed the game, that is what killed the game. Sometimes you talk about Ronaldinho and Eto'o and people like that; you need to talk about the proper footballer who made the difference, and that was Henrik Larsson tonight." Henry also remarked, "You have to remember that Barcelona is a team. It's not Eto'o, it's not Ronaldinho. On Wednesday, the man who made the difference was Henrik Larsson. You have to give him credit for that because when he came on he made some amazing runs around the box and he showed he is a team player. You saw two times he fed the ball back to people and that's what I always talk about, he is a team player. He did that against us, even though the first goal was a close offside decision." Larsson's introduction giving Barcelona the cutting edge required to overcome Arsenal was noted by international press.

As a result of winning the Champions League, Barcelona would face Sevilla, the winners of the UEFA Cup, in the UEFA Super Cup. Played on 25 August 2006, the match was won 3–0 by Sevilla. Barcelona's victory meant they would also participate in the FIFA Club World Cup. Receiving a bye in the first round, they beat Mexicans Club América 4–0 in the semi-finals to progress to the final where they faced Copa Libertadores champions Internacional of Brazil, who won 1–0.

== See also ==
- 2006 UEFA Cup final
- 2006 UEFA Women's Cup final
- 2005–06 Arsenal F.C. season
- 2005–06 FC Barcelona season
- Arsenal F.C. in European football
- FC Barcelona in international football
