= Ole Hermann Borgan =

Norwegian football assistant referee

- Full name: Ole Hermann Borgan
- Born: October 10, 1964 (age 62); Drammen, Norway
- Other occupation: Store owner

Ole Hermann Borgan (born October 10, 1964 in Drammen) is a Norwegian football assistant referee. He has a great amount of experience and after having been appointed by UEFA on New Year's Day 1996, he has run the line for many European matches and international competitions including UEFA Euro 2004 in Portugal. Internationally he teamed up with referee Terje Hauge and fellow assistant referee Steinar Holvik.

In May 2006 he was appointed to run the line at the Stade de France for the UEFA Champions League final between FC Barcelona and Arsenal FC, but was dismissed 48 hours prior to kickoff when he was seen in Paris posing in a Barcelona jersey. His replacement was fellow Norwegian Arild Sundet.

Borgan later retired from international refereeing, citing disappointment with how the Football Association of Norway handled the case.
