= 2005–06 UEFA Champions League knockout stage =

International football competition

The knockout stage of the 2005–06 UEFA Champions League featured the 16 teams who finished in the top two positions in each of the eight groups in the group stage. It was played as a single-elimination tournament, with ties in the round of 16, quarter-finals and semi-finals played over two legs. The first matches of the round of 16 were played on 21 February 2006 and the final was played on 17 May 2006 at the Stade de France in Saint-Denis, near Paris, France.

== Qualified teams ==
Key to colours
Seeded in round of 16 draw
Unseeded in round of 16 draw

Group	Winners	Runners-up
A	(Italy) Juventus	(Germany) Bayern Munich
B	(England) Arsenal	(Netherlands) Ajax
C	(Spain) Barcelona	(Germany) Werder Bremen
D	(Spain) Villarreal	(Portugal) Benfica
E	(Italy) Milan	(Netherlands) PSV Eindhoven
F	(France) Lyon	(Spain) Real Madrid
G	(England) Liverpool	(England) Chelsea
H	(Italy) Internazionale	(Scotland) Rangers

== Bracket ==
Round of 16
(Spain) Real Madrid	0	0	0
(England) Arsenal	1	0	1
(Germany) Werder Bremen	3	1	4
(Italy) Juventus (a)	2	2	4
(Netherlands) Ajax	2	0	2
(Italy) Internazionale	2	1	3
(Scotland) Rangers	2	1	3
(Spain) Villarreal (a)	2	1	3
(Netherlands) PSV Eindhoven	0	0	0
(France) Lyon	1	4	5
(Germany) Bayern Munich	1	1	2
(Italy) Milan	1	4	5
(Portugal) Benfica	1	2	3
(England) Liverpool	0	0	0
(England) Chelsea	1	1	2
(Spain) Barcelona	2	1	3

Quarter-finals
(England) Arsenal	2	0	2
(Italy) Juventus	0	0	0
(Italy) Internazionale	2	0	2
(Spain) Villarreal (a)	1	1	2
(France) Lyon	0	1	1
(Italy) Milan	0	3	3
(Portugal) Benfica	0	0	0
(Spain) Barcelona	0	2	2

Semi-finals
(England) Arsenal	1	0	1
(Spain) Villarreal	0	0	0
(Italy) Milan	0	0	0
(Spain) Barcelona	1	0	1

Final
17 May – Saint-Denis
(England) Arsenal	1
(Spain) Barcelona	2

== Round of 16 ==
=== Summary ===
Team 1	Agg.	Team 2	1st leg	2nd leg
Chelsea (England)	2–3	(Spain) Barcelona	1–2	1–1
Real Madrid (Spain)	0–1	(England) Arsenal	0–1	0–0
Werder Bremen (Germany)	4–4 (a)	(Italy) Juventus	3–2	1–2
Bayern Munich (Germany)	2–5	(Italy) Milan	1–1	1–4
PSV Eindhoven (Netherlands)	0–5	(France) Lyon	0–1	0–4
Ajax (Netherlands)	2–3	(Italy) Internazionale	2–2	0–1
Benfica (Portugal)	3–0	(England) Liverpool	1–0	2–0
Rangers (Scotland)	3–3 (a)	(Spain) Villarreal	2–2	1–1

=== Matches ===
22 February 2006
20:45 (19:45 UTC+0)

Chelsea (England)	1–2	(Spain) Barcelona
Motta 59' (o.g.)	Report	Terry 71' (o.g.); Eto'o 80'

Stamford Bridge, London
Attendance: 39,521
Referee: Terje Hauge (Norway)
7 March 2006
20:45

Barcelona (Spain)	1–1	(England) Chelsea
Ronaldinho 78'	Report	Lampard 90+2' (pen.)

Camp Nou, Barcelona
Attendance: 98,436
Referee: Markus Merk (Germany)

Barcelona won 3–2 on aggregate.

21 February 2006
20:45

Real Madrid (Spain)	0–1	(England) Arsenal
	Report	Henry 47'

Santiago Bernabéu, Madrid
Attendance: 74,000
Referee: Stefano Farina (Italy)
8 March 2006
20:45 (19:45 UTC+0)

Arsenal (England)	0–0	(Spain) Real Madrid
	Report

Highbury, London
Attendance: 35,487
Referee: Ľuboš Micheľ (Slovakia)

Arsenal won 1–0 on aggregate.

22 February 2006
20:45

Werder Bremen (Germany)	3–2	(Italy) Juventus
Schulz 39'; Borowski 87'; Micoud 90+2'	Report	Nedvěd 73'; Trezeguet 82'

Weserstadion, Bremen
Attendance: 36,500
Referee: Manuel Mejuto González (Spain)
7 March 2006
20:45

Juventus (Italy)	2–1	(Germany) Werder Bremen
Trezeguet 65'; Emerson 88'	Report	Micoud 13'

Stadio delle Alpi, Turin
Attendance: 40,226
Referee: Graham Poll (England)

4–4 on aggregate; Juventus won on away goals.

21 February 2006
20:45

Bayern Munich (Germany)	1–1	(Italy) Milan
Ballack 23'	Report	Shevchenko 58' (pen.)

Allianz Arena, Munich
Attendance: 66,000
Referee: Frank De Bleeckere (Belgium)
8 March 2006
20:45

Milan (Italy)	4–1	(Germany) Bayern Munich
Inzaghi 8', 47'; Shevchenko 25'; Kaká 59'	Report	Ismaël 35'

San Siro, Milan
Attendance: 78,577
Referee: Valentin Ivanov (Russia)

Milan won 5–2 on aggregate.

21 February 2006
20:45

PSV Eindhoven (Netherlands)	0–1	(France) Lyon
	Report	Juninho 65'

Philips Stadion, Eindhoven
Attendance: 35,000
Referee: Kyros Vassaras (Greece)
8 March 2006
20:45

Lyon (France)	4–0	(Netherlands) PSV Eindhoven
Tiago 26', 45+4'; Wiltord 71'; Fred 90'	Report

Stade de Gerland, Lyon
Attendance: 37,901
Referee: Mike Riley (England)

Lyon won 5–0 on aggregate.

22 February 2006
20:45

Ajax (Netherlands)	2–2	(Italy) Internazionale
Huntelaar 16'; Rosales 20'	Report	Stanković 49'; Cruz 86'

Amsterdam Arena, Amsterdam
Attendance: 46,663
Referee: Wolfgang Stark (Germany)
14 March 2006
20:45

Internazionale (Italy)	1–0	(Netherlands) Ajax
Stanković 57'	Report

San Siro, Milan
Attendance: 48,489
Referee: Peter Fröjdfeldt (Sweden)

Internazionale won 3–2 on aggregate.

21 February 2006
20:45 (19:45 UTC+0)

Benfica (Portugal)	1–0	(England) Liverpool
Luisão 84'	Report

Estádio da Luz, Lisbon
Attendance: 63,702
Referee: Konrad Plautz (Austria)
8 March 2006
20:45 (19:45 UTC+0)

Liverpool (England)	0–2	(Portugal) Benfica
	Report	Simão 36'; Miccoli 89'

Anfield, Liverpool
Attendance: 42,744
Referee: Massimo De Santis (Italy)

Benfica won 3–0 on aggregate.

22 February 2006
20:45 (19:45 UTC+0)

Rangers (Scotland)	2–2	(Spain) Villarreal
Løvenkrands 22'; Peña 82' (o.g.)	Report	Riquelme 8' (pen.); Forlán 35'

Ibrox Stadium, Glasgow
Attendance: 49,372
Referee: Eric Poulat (France)
7 March 2006
20:45

Villarreal (Spain)	1–1	(Scotland) Rangers
Arruabarrena 49'	Report	Løvenkrands 12'

Estadio El Madrigal, Villarreal
Attendance: 19,828
Referee: Alain Hamer (Luxembourg)

3–3 on aggregate; Villarreal won on away goals.

== Quarter-finals ==
=== Summary ===
Team 1	Agg.	Team 2	1st leg	2nd leg
Arsenal (England)	2–0	(Italy) Juventus	2–0	0–0
Lyon (France)	1–3	(Italy) Milan	0–0	1–3
Internazionale (Italy)	2–2 (a)	(Spain) Villarreal	2–1	0–1
Benfica (Portugal)	0–2	(Spain) Barcelona	0–0	0–2

=== Matches ===
28 March 2006
20:45 (19:45 UTC+1)

Arsenal (England)	2–0	(Italy) Juventus
Fàbregas 40'; Henry 69'	Report

Highbury, London
Attendance: 35,472
Referee: Peter Fröjdfeldt (Sweden)
5 April 2006
20:45

Juventus (Italy)	0–0	(England) Arsenal
	Report

Stadio delle Alpi, Turin
Attendance: 46,031
Referee: Herbert Fandel (Germany)

Arsenal won 2–0 on aggregate.

29 March 2006
20:45

Lyon (France)	0–0	(Italy) Milan
	Report

Stade de Gerland, Lyon
Attendance: 39,313
Referee: Konrad Plautz (Austria)
4 April 2006
20:45

Milan (Italy)	3–1	(France) Lyon
Inzaghi 25', 88'; Shevchenko 90+3'	Report	Diarra 31'

San Siro, Milan
Attendance: 78,894
Referee: Terje Hauge (Norway)

Milan won 3–1 on aggregate.

29 March 2006
20:45

Internazionale (Italy)	2–1	(Spain) Villarreal
Adriano 7'; Martins 54'	Report	Forlán 1'

San Siro, Milan
Attendance: 49,165
Referee: Alain Sars (France)
4 April 2006
20:45

Villarreal (Spain)	1–0	(Italy) Internazionale
Arruabarrena 58'	Report

Estadio El Madrigal, Villarreal
Attendance: 21,700
Referee: Kyros Vassaras (Greece)

2–2 on aggregate; Villarreal won on away goals.

28 March 2006
20:45 (19:45 UTC+1)

Benfica (Portugal)	0–0	(Spain) Barcelona
	Report

Estádio da Luz, Lisbon
Attendance: 64,395
Referee: Steve Bennett (England)
5 April 2006
20:45

Barcelona (Spain)	2–0	(Portugal) Benfica
Ronaldinho 19'; Eto'o 89'	Report

Camp Nou, Barcelona
Attendance: 89,875
Referee: Ľuboš Micheľ (Slovakia)

Barcelona won 2–0 on aggregate.

== Semi-finals ==
=== Summary ===
Team 1	Agg.	Team 2	1st leg	2nd leg
Arsenal (England)	1–0	(Spain) Villarreal	1–0	0–0
Milan (Italy)	0–1	(Spain) Barcelona	0–1	0–0

=== Matches ===
19 April 2006
20:45 (19:45 UTC+1)

Arsenal (England)	1–0	(Spain) Villarreal
Touré 41'	Report

Highbury, London
Attendance: 35,438
Referee: Konrad Plautz (Austria)
25 April 2006
20:45

Villarreal (Spain)	0–0	(England) Arsenal
	Report

Estadio El Madrigal, Villarreal
Attendance: 21,237
Referee: Valentin Ivanov (Russia)

Arsenal won 1–0 on aggregate.

18 April 2006
20:45

Milan (Italy)	0–1	(Spain) Barcelona
	Report	Giuly 57'

San Siro, Milan
Attendance: 76,883
Referee: Alain Sars (France)
26 April 2006
20:45

Barcelona (Spain)	0–0	(Italy) Milan
	Report

Camp Nou, Barcelona
Attendance: 95,661
Referee: Markus Merk (Germany)

Barcelona won 1–0 on aggregate.

== Final ==
The final was played on 17 May 2006 at the Stade de France in Saint-Denis, France.

17 May 2006
20:45

Barcelona (Spain)	2–1	(England) Arsenal
Eto'o 76'; Belletti 80'	Report	Campbell 37'

Stade de France, Saint-Denis
Attendance: 79,610
Referee: Terje Hauge (Norway)
