= 2005–06 UEFA Champions League =

European football tournament

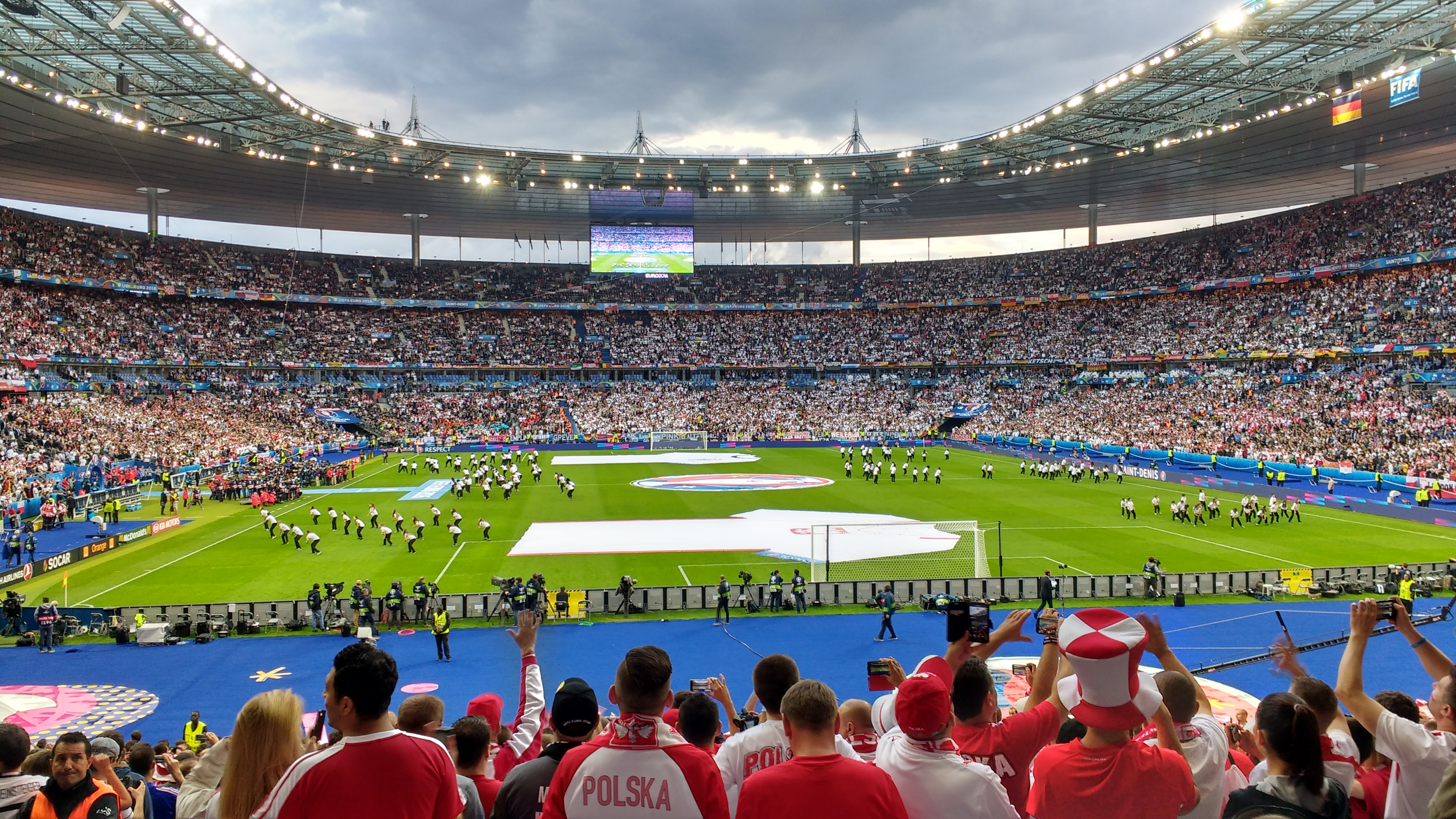
- The Stade de France in Saint-Denis hosted the final

Tournament details
- Dates: Qualifying: 12 July – 24 August 2005; Competition proper: 13 September 2005 – 17 May 2006
- Teams: Competition proper: 32; Total: 74

Final positions
- Champions: (Spain) Barcelona (2nd title)
- Runners-up: (England) Arsenal

Tournament statistics
- Matches played: 125
- Goals scored: 285 (2.28 per match)
- Attendance: 5,133,156 (41,065 per match)
- Top scorer(s): Andriy Shevchenko (Milan); 9 goals

The 2005–06 UEFA Champions League was the 51st season of UEFA's premier European club football tournament, the UEFA Champions League and the 14th since it was rebranded from the European Cup in 1992. 74 teams from 50 football associations took part, starting with the first qualifying round played on 12 July 2005.

The final was played on 17 May 2006 at Stade de France, Saint-Denis between Barcelona and Arsenal. In the 18th minute, Arsenal goalkeeper Jens Lehmann became the first player to be sent off in a European Cup final. Despite the disadvantage, Sol Campbell gave the English side the lead in the 37th minute. Samuel Eto'o brought Barcelona back on level terms in the 76th minute, before Juliano Belletti scored the winning goal five minutes later.

Liverpool were the defending champions and as they did not qualify by their league position, UEFA gave them special dispensation and allowed them to defend their title from the first qualifying round of the competition. They made the group stage and progressed but were eliminated by Benfica in the first knockout round. From the following season, UEFA reserved a berth in the group stage for the defending champions regardless of their league position.

== Association team allocation ==
A total of 74 teams from 49 of the 52 UEFA member associations participated in the 2005–06 UEFA Champions League (the exception being Liechtenstein, which does not organise a domestic league, Andorra and San Marino). The association ranking based on the UEFA country coefficients was used to determine the number of participating teams for each association:

- Associations 1–3 each have four teams qualify.
- Associations 4–6 each have three teams qualify.
- Associations 7–15 each have two teams qualify.
- Associations 16–50 (except Liechtenstein) each have one team qualify.
- As the winners of the 2004–05 UEFA Champions League, Liverpool gained entry an additional entry despite not qualifying through their domestic league position. They were, however, entered into the 1st qualifying round due to finishing the 2004–05 FA Premier League outside the top four.

=== Association ranking ===
For the 2005–06 UEFA Champions League, the associations are allocated places according to their 2004 UEFA country coefficients, which takes into account their performance in European competitions from 1999–2000 to 2003–04.

Apart from the allocation based on the country coefficients, associations may have additional teams participating in the Champions League, as noted below:

- (UCL) – Additional berth for the 2004–05 UEFA Champions League winners

Rank	Association	Coeff.	Teams	Notes
1	Spain	79.851	4	
2	England	62.153	4	+1 (UCL)
3	Italy	59.186	4	
4	Germany	49.489	3	
5	France	48.326	3	
6	Portugal	42.333	3	
7	Greece	34.748	2	
8	Netherlands	34.081	2	
9	Czech Republic	33.075	2	
10	Turkey	32.291	2	
11	Scotland	32.125	2	
12	Belgium	28.875	2	
13	Switzerland	22.375	2	
14	Ukraine	22.125	2	
15	Norway	21.900	2	
16	Poland	21.750	1	
17	Israel	21.249	1	
18	Austria	21.125	1	

Rank	Association	Coeff.	Teams	Notes
19	Serbia and Montenegro	20.165	1	
20	Bulgaria	19.998	1	
21	Russia	19.916	1	
22	Denmark	17.450	1	
23	Croatia	17.375	1	
24	Sweden	16.716	1	
25	Hungary	15.290	1	
26	Romania	14.790	1	
27	Slovakia	12.832	1	
28	Slovenia	9.165	1	
29	Cyprus	8.998	1	
30	Moldova	6.832	1	
31	Latvia	5.998	1	
32	Finland	5.874	1	
33	Bosnia and Herzegovina	5.499	1	
34	Georgia	4.999	1	
35	Macedonia	4.830	1	
36	Lithuania	4.165	1	

Rank	Association	Coeff.	Teams	Notes
37	Belarus	3.582	1	
38	Iceland	3.332	1	
39	Malta	3.331	1	
40	Republic of Ireland	3.164	1	
41	Armenia	2.831	1	
42	Wales	2.332	1	
43	Liechtenstein	2.000	0	
44	Albania	1.831	1	
45	Northern Ireland	1.665	1	
46	Estonia	1.665	1	
47	Luxembourg	1.498	1	
48	Azerbaijan	1.165	1	
49	Faroe Islands	0.832	1	
50	Kazakhstan	0.666	1	
51	Andorra	0.000	0	
52	San Marino	0.000	0	

=== Distribution ===
Because the title holders, Liverpool, entered the competition in the first qualifying round rather than the group stage, the following changes to the default access list were made:

- The champions of association 10 (Turkey) were promoted from the third qualifying round to the group stage.
- The champions of association 16 (Poland) were promoted from the second qualifying round to the third qualifying round.
- The champions of association 26 (Romania) were promoted from the first qualifying round to the second qualifying round.

	Teams entering in this round	Teams advancing from previous round
First qualifying round (24 teams)	23 champions from associations 27–50 (except Liechtenstein); 1 current Champions League title holder (Liverpool)	
Second qualifying round (28 teams)	10 champions from associations 17–26; 6 runners-up from associations 10–15	12 winners from the first qualifying round
Third qualifying round (32 teams)	6 champions from associations 11–16; 3 runners-up from associations 7–9; 6 third-place finishers from associations 1–6; 3 fourth-place finishers from associations 1–3	14 winners from the second qualifying round
Group stage (32 teams)	10 champions from associations 1–10; 6 runners-up from associations 1–6	16 winners from the third qualifying round
Knockout phase (16 teams)		8 group winners from the group stage; 8 group runners-up from the group stage

=== Teams ===
League positions of the previous season qualified via league position shown in parentheses. Liverpool qualified as title holders. (TH: Champions League title holders).

Group stage
(Spain) Barcelona (1st)	(Italy) Juventus (1st)	(France) Lyon (1st)	(Greece) Olympiacos (1st)
(Spain) Real Madrid (2nd)	(Italy) Milan (2nd)	(France) Lille (2nd)	(Netherlands) PSV Eindhoven (1st)
(England) Chelsea (1st)	(Germany) Bayern Munich (1st)	(Portugal) Benfica (1st)	(Czech Republic) Sparta Prague (1st)
(England) Arsenal (2nd)	(Germany) Schalke 04 (2nd)	(Portugal) Porto (2nd)	(Turkey) Fenerbahçe (1st)
Third qualifying round
(Spain) Villarreal (3rd)	(Italy) Udinese (4th)	(Netherlands) Ajax (2nd)	(Switzerland) Basel (1st)
(Spain) Real Betis (4th)	(Germany) Werder Bremen (3rd)	(Czech Republic) Slavia Prague (2nd)	(Ukraine) Shakhtar Donetsk (1st)
(England) Manchester United (3rd)	(France) Monaco (3rd)	(Scotland) Rangers (1st)	(Norway) Rosenborg (1st)
(England) Everton (4th)	(Portugal) Sporting CP (3rd)	(Belgium) Club Brugge (1st)	(Poland) Wisła Kraków (1st)
(Italy) Internazionale (3rd)	(Greece) Panathinaikos (2nd)		
Second qualifying round
(Turkey) Trabzonspor (2nd)	(Ukraine) Dynamo Kyiv (2nd)	(Serbia and Montenegro) Partizan (1st)	(Croatia) Hajduk Split (1st)
(Belgium) Anderlecht (2nd)	(Norway) Vålerenga (2nd)	(Bulgaria) CSKA Sofia (1st)	(Sweden) Malmö FF (1st)
(Scotland) Celtic (2nd)	(Israel) Maccabi Haifa (1st)	(Russia) Lokomotiv Moscow (1st)	(Hungary) Debrecen (1st)
(Switzerland) Thun (2nd)	(Austria) Rapid Wien (1st)	(Denmark) Brøndby (1st)	(Romania) Steaua București (1st)
First qualifying round
(England) Liverpool (TH)	(Finland) Haka (1st)	(Iceland) FH (1st)	(Northern Ireland) Glentoran (1st)
(Slovakia) Artmedia Bratislava (1st)	(Bosnia and Herzegovina) Zrinjski Mostar (1st)	(Malta) Sliema Wanderers (1st)	(Estonia) Levadia Tallinn (1st)
(Slovenia) HIT Gorica (1st)	(Georgia (country)) Dinamo Tbilisi (1st)	(Republic of Ireland) Shelbourne (1st)	(Luxembourg) F91 Dudelange (1st)
(Cyprus) Anorthosis Famagusta (1st)	(North Macedonia) Rabotnicki (1st)	(Armenia) Pyunik (1st)	(Azerbaijan) Neftçi (1st)
(Moldova) Sheriff Tiraspol (1st)	(Lithuania) Kaunas (1st)	(Wales) Total Network Solutions (1st)	(Faroe Islands) HB (1st)
(Latvia) Skonto (1st)	(Belarus) Dinamo Minsk (1st)	(Albania) Tirana (1st)	(Kazakhstan) Kairat (1st)

== Round and draw dates ==
The schedule of the competition was as follows (all draws were held at UEFA headquarters in Nyon, Switzerland, unless stated otherwise).

Phase	Round	Draw date	First leg	Second leg
Qualifying	First qualifying round	24 June 2005	12–13 July 2005	19–20 July 2005
Qualifying	Second qualifying round	24 June 2005	26–27 July 2005	2–3 August 2005
Qualifying	Third qualifying round	29 July 2005	9–10 August 2005	23–24 August 2005
Group stage	Matchday 1	25 August 2005 (Monaco)	13–14 September 2005	
Group stage	Matchday 2	25 August 2005 (Monaco)	27–28 September 2005	
Group stage	Matchday 3	25 August 2005 (Monaco)	18–19 October 2005	
Group stage	Matchday 4	25 August 2005 (Monaco)	1–2 November 2005	
Group stage	Matchday 5	25 August 2005 (Monaco)	22–23 November 2005	
Group stage	Matchday 6	25 August 2005 (Monaco)	6–7 December 2005	
Knockout phase	Round of 16	16 December 2005	21–22 February 2006	7–8 March 2006 (Note: Internazionale home game in the Round of 16 was rescheduled to one week later (14 March 2006) due to venue clash with Milan.)
Knockout phase	Quarter-finals	10 March 2006	28–29 March 2006	4–5 April 2006
Knockout phase	Semi-finals	10 March 2006	18–19 April 2006	25–26 April 2006
Knockout phase	Final	10 March 2006	17 May 2006 at Stade de France, Saint-Denis	

== Qualifying rounds ==
=== First qualifying round ===
Title-holders Liverpool, as well as 23 league champions from countries ranked 27 or lower in the 2004 UEFA ranking, were drawn against each other and played two matches, home and away, with the winners advancing to the second qualifying round. Though they finished fifth in the Premier League in 2004–05 (at the time, only four teams from an association were allowed to compete in the Champions League), Liverpool were granted a special exemption by UEFA as the holders, whereby they were placed into the first qualification round, and were drawn against TNS in that round.

Team 1	Agg.	Team 2	1st leg	2nd leg
Levadia Tallinn (Estonia)	1–2	(Georgia (country)) Dinamo Tbilisi	1–0	0–2
Kairat (Kazakhstan)	3–4	(Slovakia) Artmedia Bratislava	2–0	1–4 (a.e.t.)
Neftçi (Azerbaijan)	4–1	(Iceland) FH	2–0	2–1
Rabotnicki (North Macedonia)	6–1	(Latvia) Skonto	6–0	0–1
Dinamo Minsk (Belarus)	1–2	(Cyprus) Anorthosis Famagusta	1–1	0–1
Sliema Wanderers (Malta)	1–6	(Moldova) Sheriff Tiraspol	1–4	0–2
HB (Faroe Islands)	2–8	(Lithuania) Kaunas	2–4	0–4
Liverpool (England)	6–0	(Wales) Total Network Solutions	3–0	3–0
Haka (Finland)	3–2	(Armenia) Pyunik	1–0	2–2
HIT Gorica (Slovenia)	2–3	(Albania) Tirana	2–0	0–3
Glentoran (Northern Ireland)	2–6	(Republic of Ireland) Shelbourne	1–2	1–4
F91 Dudelange (Luxembourg)	4–1	(Bosnia and Herzegovina) Zrinjski Mostar	0–1	4–0 (a.e.t.)

=== Second qualifying round ===
The 12 winners from the first qualifying round, 10 champions from countries ranked 17–26, and six second–placed teams from countries ranked 10–15 were drawn against each other and played two matches, home and away, with the winners advancing to the third qualifying round.

Team 1	Agg.	Team 2	1st leg	2nd leg
Kaunas (Lithuania)	1–5	(England) Liverpool	1–3	0–2
Dinamo Tbilisi (Georgia (country))	1–5	(Denmark) Brøndby	0–2	1–3
Anderlecht (Belgium)	5–1	(Azerbaijan) Neftçi	5–0	0–1
Vålerenga (Norway)	5–1	(Finland) Haka	1–0	4–1
Dynamo Kyiv (Ukraine)	2–3	(Switzerland) Thun	2–2	0–1
Anorthosis Famagusta (Cyprus)	3–2	(Turkey) Trabzonspor	3–1	0–1
Artmedia Bratislava (Slovakia)	5–4	(Scotland) Celtic	5–0	0–4
Tirana (Albania)	0–4	(Bulgaria) CSKA Sofia	0–2	0–2
Malmö FF (Sweden)	5–4	(Israel) Maccabi Haifa	3–2	2–2
Shelbourne (Republic of Ireland)	1–4	(Romania) Steaua București	0–0	1–4
Rabotnicki (North Macedonia)	1–3	(Russia) Lokomotiv Moscow	1–1	0–2
F91 Dudelange (Luxembourg)	3–9	(Austria) Rapid Wien	1–6	2–3
Partizan (Serbia and Montenegro)	2–0	(Moldova) Sheriff Tiraspol	1–0	1–0
Debrecen (Hungary)	8–0	(Croatia) Hajduk Split	3–0	5–0

=== Third qualifying round ===
The 14 winners from the second qualifying round, six champions from countries ranked 11–16, three second–placed teams from countries ranked 7–9, six third–placed teams from countries ranked 1–6, and three fourth–placed teams from countries ranked 1–3 were drawn to play 2 matches, home and away, with the winners advancing to the group stage and losers advancing to the first round of the UEFA Cup.

Team 1	Agg.	Team 2	1st leg	2nd leg
Wisła Kraków (Poland)	4–5	(Greece) Panathinaikos	3–1	1–4 (a.e.t.)
Real Betis (Spain)	3–2	(France) Monaco	1–0	2–2
Vålerenga (Norway)	1–1 (3–4 p)	(Belgium) Club Brugge	1–0	0–1 (a.e.t.)
Manchester United (England)	6–0	(Hungary) Debrecen	3–0	3–0
Everton (England)	2–4	(Spain) Villarreal	1–2	1–2
Anorthosis Famagusta (Cyprus)	1–4	(Scotland) Rangers	1–2	0–2
Steaua București (Romania)	3–4	(Norway) Rosenborg	1–1	2–3
Rapid Wien (Austria)	2–1	(Russia) Lokomotiv Moscow	1–1	1–0
Artmedia Bratislava (Slovakia)	0–0 (4–3 p)	(Serbia and Montenegro) Partizan	0–0	0–0 (a.e.t.)
CSKA Sofia (Bulgaria)	2–3	(England) Liverpool	1–3	1–0
Sporting CP (Portugal)	2–4	(Italy) Udinese	0–1	2–3
Malmö FF (Sweden)	0–4	(Switzerland) Thun	0–1	0–3
Shakhtar Donetsk (Ukraine)	1–3	(Italy) Internazionale	0–2	1–1
Basel (Switzerland)	2–4	(Germany) Werder Bremen	2–1	0–3
Brøndby (Denmark)	3–5	(Netherlands) Ajax	2–2	1–3
Anderlecht (Belgium)	4–1	(Czech Republic) Slavia Prague	2–1	2–0

== Group stage ==
Location of teams of the 2005–06 UEFA Champions League group stage.
Brown: Group A; Red: Group B; Orange: Group C; Yellow: Group D;
Green: Group E; Blue: Group F; Purple: Group G; Pink: Group H.

16 winners from the third qualifying round, 10 champions from countries ranked 1–10, and 6 second-placed teams from countries ranked 1–6 were drawn into 8 groups of 4 teams each. Normally two teams from the same association cannot be drawn in the same group. The only exception is Liverpool because of their abnormal qualification as title holders because not having finished in the top four of the English league, Liverpool were given no "association protection" in the tournament. For the group stage, the only team from the same association they could be drawn with was Chelsea, as the rest were in the same seeding pot. The top 2 teams in each group advanced to the Champions League knock-out stage, while the third-placed teams advanced to the Round of 32 in the UEFA Cup.

Tiebreakers are applied in the following order:

1. Points earned in head-to-head matches between the tied teams.
2. Total goals scored in head-to-head matches between the tied teams.
3. Away goals scored in head-to-head matches between the tied teams.
4. Cumulative goal difference in all group matches.
5. Total goals scored in all group matches.
6. Higher UEFA coefficient going into the competition.

Artmedia Bratislava, Real Betis, Thun, Udinese and Villarreal made their debut appearances in the group stage.

=== Group A ===
Pos	Team	Pld	W	D	L	GF	GA	GD	Pts	Qualification	JUV	BAY	BRU	RWI
1	(Italy) Juventus	6	5	0	1	12	5	+7	15	Advance to knockout stage	—	2–1	1–0	3–0
2	(Germany) Bayern Munich	6	4	1	1	10	4	+6	13	Advance to knockout stage	2–1	—	1–0	4–0
3	(Belgium) Club Brugge	6	2	1	3	6	7	−1	7	Transfer to UEFA Cup	1–2	1–1	—	3–2
4	(Austria) Rapid Wien	6	0	0	6	3	15	−12	0		1–3	0–1	0–1	—

Source: RSSSF

=== Group B ===
Pos	Team	Pld	W	D	L	GF	GA	GD	Pts	Qualification	ARS	AJX	THU	SPP
1	(England) Arsenal	6	5	1	0	10	2	+8	16	Advance to knockout stage	—	0–0	2–1	3–0
2	(Netherlands) Ajax	6	3	2	1	10	6	+4	11	Advance to knockout stage	1–2	—	2–0	2–1
3	(Switzerland) Thun	6	1	1	4	4	9	−5	4	Transfer to UEFA Cup	0–1	2–4	—	1–0
4	(Czech Republic) Sparta Prague	6	0	2	4	2	9	−7	2		0–2	1–1	0–0	—

Source: RSSSF

=== Group C ===
Pos	Team	Pld	W	D	L	GF	GA	GD	Pts	Qualification	BAR	BRM	UDI	PAN
1	(Spain) Barcelona	6	5	1	0	16	2	+14	16	Advance to knockout stage	—	3–1	4–1	5–0
2	(Germany) Werder Bremen	6	2	1	3	12	12	0	7	Advance to knockout stage	0–2	—	4–3	5–1
3	(Italy) Udinese	6	2	1	3	10	12	−2	7	Transfer to UEFA Cup	0–2	1–1	—	3–0
4	(Greece) Panathinaikos	6	1	1	4	4	16	−12	4		0–0	2–1	1–2	—

Source: RSSSF

=== Group D ===
Pos	Team	Pld	W	D	L	GF	GA	GD	Pts	Qualification	VIL	BEN	LIL	MUN
1	(Spain) Villarreal	6	2	4	0	3	1	+2	10	Advance to knockout stage	—	1–1	1–0	0–0
2	(Portugal) Benfica	6	2	2	2	5	5	0	8	Advance to knockout stage	0–1	—	1–0	2–1
3	(France) Lille	6	1	3	2	1	2	−1	6	Transfer to UEFA Cup	0–0	0–0	—	1–0
4	(England) Manchester United	6	1	3	2	3	4	−1	6		0–0	2–1	0–0	—

Source: RSSSF

=== Group E ===
Pos	Team	Pld	W	D	L	GF	GA	GD	Pts	Qualification	MIL	PSV	SCH	FEN
1	(Italy) Milan	6	3	2	1	12	6	+6	11	Advance to knockout stage	—	0–0	3–2	3–1
2	(Netherlands) PSV Eindhoven	6	3	1	2	4	6	−2	10	Advance to knockout stage	1–0	—	1–0	2–0
3	(Germany) Schalke 04	6	2	2	2	12	9	+3	8	Transfer to UEFA Cup	2–2	3–0	—	2–0
4	(Turkey) Fenerbahçe	6	1	1	4	7	14	−7	4		0–4	3–0	3–3	—

Source: RSSSF

=== Group F ===
Pos	Team	Pld	W	D	L	GF	GA	GD	Pts	Qualification	LYO	RMA	ROS	OLY
1	(France) Lyon	6	5	1	0	13	4	+9	16	Advance to knockout stage	—	3–0	2–1	2–1
2	(Spain) Real Madrid	6	3	1	2	10	8	+2	10	Advance to knockout stage	1–1	—	4–1	2–1
3	(Norway) Rosenborg	6	1	1	4	6	11	−5	4	Transfer to UEFA Cup	0–1	0–2	—	1–1
4	(Greece) Olympiacos	6	1	1	4	7	13	−6	4		1–4	2–1	1–3	—

Source: RSSSF

=== Group G ===
Pos	Team	Pld	W	D	L	GF	GA	GD	Pts	Qualification	LIV	CHE	BET	AND
1	(England) Liverpool	6	3	3	0	6	1	+5	12	Advance to knockout stage	—	0–0	0–0	3–0
2	(England) Chelsea	6	3	2	1	7	1	+6	11	Advance to knockout stage	0–0	—	4–0	1–0
3	(Spain) Real Betis	6	2	1	3	3	7	−4	7	Transfer to UEFA Cup	1–2	1–0	—	0–1
4	(Belgium) Anderlecht	6	1	0	5	1	8	−7	3		0–1	0–2	0–1	—

Source: RSSSF

=== Group H ===
Pos	Team	Pld	W	D	L	GF	GA	GD	Pts	Qualification	INT	RAN	ART	POR
1	(Italy) Internazionale	6	4	1	1	9	4	+5	13	Advance to knockout stage	—	1–0	4–0	2–1
2	(Scotland) Rangers	6	1	4	1	7	7	0	7	Advance to knockout stage	1–1	—	0–0	3–2
3	(Slovakia) Artmedia Bratislava	6	1	3	2	5	9	−4	6	Transfer to UEFA Cup	0–1	2–2	—	0–0
4	(Portugal) Porto	6	1	2	3	8	9	−1	5		2–0	1–1	2–3	—

Source: RSSSF

== Knockout phase ==
=== Bracket ===
Round of 16
(Spain) Real Madrid	0	0	0
(England) Arsenal	1	0	1
(Germany) Werder Bremen	3	1	4
(Italy) Juventus (a)	2	2	4
(Netherlands) Ajax	2	0	2
(Italy) Internazionale	2	1	3
(Scotland) Rangers	2	1	3
(Spain) Villarreal (a)	2	1	3
(Netherlands) PSV Eindhoven	0	0	0
(France) Lyon	1	4	5
(Germany) Bayern Munich	1	1	2
(Italy) Milan	1	4	5
(Portugal) Benfica	1	2	3
(England) Liverpool	0	0	0
(England) Chelsea	1	1	2
(Spain) Barcelona	2	1	3

Quarter-finals
(England) Arsenal	2	0	2
(Italy) Juventus	0	0	0
(Italy) Internazionale	2	0	2
(Spain) Villarreal (a)	1	1	2
(France) Lyon	0	1	1
(Italy) Milan	0	3	3
(Portugal) Benfica	0	0	0
(Spain) Barcelona	0	2	2

Semi-finals
(England) Arsenal	1	0	1
(Spain) Villarreal	0	0	0
(Italy) Milan	0	0	0
(Spain) Barcelona	1	0	1

Final
17 May – Saint-Denis
(England) Arsenal	1
(Spain) Barcelona	2

=== Round of 16 ===
Team 1	Agg.	Team 2	1st leg	2nd leg
Chelsea (England)	2–3	(Spain) Barcelona	1–2	1–1
Real Madrid (Spain)	0–1	(England) Arsenal	0–1	0–0
Werder Bremen (Germany)	4–4 (a)	(Italy) Juventus	3–2	1–2
Bayern Munich (Germany)	2–5	(Italy) Milan	1–1	1–4
PSV Eindhoven (Netherlands)	0–5	(France) Lyon	0–1	0–4
Ajax (Netherlands)	2–3	(Italy) Internazionale	2–2	0–1
Benfica (Portugal)	3–0	(England) Liverpool	1–0	2–0
Rangers (Scotland)	3–3 (a)	(Spain) Villarreal	2–2	1–1

=== Quarter-finals ===
Team 1	Agg.	Team 2	1st leg	2nd leg
Arsenal (England)	2–0	(Italy) Juventus	2–0	0–0
Lyon (France)	1–3	(Italy) Milan	0–0	1–3
Internazionale (Italy)	2–2 (a)	(Spain) Villarreal	2–1	0–1
Benfica (Portugal)	0–2	(Spain) Barcelona	0–0	0–2

=== Semi-finals ===
Team 1	Agg.	Team 2	1st leg	2nd leg
Arsenal (England)	1–0	(Spain) Villarreal	1–0	0–0
Milan (Italy)	0–1	(Spain) Barcelona	0–1	0–0

=== Final ===
The final was played on 17 May 2006 at the Stade de France in Saint-Denis, France.

17 May 2006
20:45 UTC+2

Barcelona (Spain)	2–1	(England) Arsenal
Eto'o 76'; Belletti 80'	Report	Campbell 37'

Stade de France, Saint-Denis
Attendance: 79,610
Referee: Terje Hauge (Norway)

== Statistics ==
Statistics exclude qualifying rounds.

=== Top goalscorers ===
Rank	Player	Team	Goals	Minutes played
1	(Ukraine) Andriy Shevchenko	(Italy) Milan	9	950
2	(Brazil) Ronaldinho	(Spain) Barcelona	7	1078
3	(France) David Trezeguet	(Italy) Juventus	6	733
3	(Cameroon) Samuel Eto'o	(Spain) Barcelona	6	978
5	(Brazil) Adriano	(Italy) Internazionale	5	679
5	(France) Johan Micoud	(Germany) Werder Bremen	5	720
5	(France) Thierry Henry	(England) Arsenal	5	931
5	(Brazil) Kaká	(Italy) Milan	5	986
9	(Argentina) Julio Cruz	(Italy) Internazionale	4	370
9	(Italy) Filippo Inzaghi	(Italy) Milan	4	394
9	(Italy) Vincenzo Iaquinta	(Italy) Udinese	4	434
9	(Norway) John Carew	(France) Lyon	4	623
9	(Denmark) Peter Løvenkrands	(Scotland) Rangers	4	656
9	(Brazil) Juninho	(France) Lyon	4	691

=== Squad of the season ===
UEFA's Technical Study Group selected the following 21 players for the 2005–06 UEFA Champions League Team of the Tournament.

Pos.	Player	Team
GK	(France) Grégory Coupet	(France) Lyon
GK	(Germany) Jens Lehmann	(England) Arsenal
GK	(Spain) Víctor Valdés	(Spain) Barcelona
DF	(Spain) Carles Puyol	(Spain) Barcelona
DF	(Italy) Gianluca Zambrotta	(Italy) Juventus
DF	(Ivory Coast) Kolo Touré	(England) Arsenal
DF	(Ivory Coast) Emmanuel Eboué	(England) Arsenal
DF	(England) John Terry	(England) Chelsea
DF	(Argentina) Gonzalo Rodríguez	(Spain) Villarreal
MF	(Portugal) Deco	(Spain) Barcelona
MF	(Argentina) Juan Román Riquelme	(Spain) Villarreal
MF	(England) Steven Gerrard	(England) Liverpool
MF	(Brazil) Kaká	(Italy) AC Milan
MF	(England) Frank Lampard	(England) Chelsea
MF	(Spain) Cesc Fàbregas	(England) Arsenal
MF	(Brazil) Juninho Pernambucano	(France) Lyon
FW	(Cameroon) Samuel Eto'o	(Spain) Barcelona
FW	(Ukraine) Andriy Shevchenko	(Italy) AC Milan
FW	(Portugal) Simão Sabrosa	(Portugal) Benfica
FW	(France) Thierry Henry	(England) Arsenal
FW	(Brazil) Ronaldinho	(Spain) Barcelona

== See also ==
- 2005–06 UEFA Cup
- 2005–06 UEFA Women's Cup
