= Davide Facchin =

Italian footballer (born 1987)

Personal information
- Date of birth: 29 April 1987 (age 39)
- Place of birth: San Donà di Piave, Italy
- Height: 1.87 m (6 ft 1 1/2 in)
- Position: Goalkeeper

Youth career
- 2001–2007: Milan

Senior career*
Years	Team	Apps	(Gls)
2007–2010	Milan	0	(0)
2007–2008	→ Olbia (loan)	33	(0)
2008–2009	→ Padova (loan)	3	(0)
2009–2010	→ Pavia (loan)	4	(0)
2010–2016	Pavia	146	(0)
2012–2013	→ Reggina (loan)	2	(0)
2014	→ South Tyrol (loan)	9	(0)
2016–2019	Venezia	36	(0)
2017–2018	→ Reggiana (loan)	31	(0)
2019–2022	Como	79	(0)
- * Club domestic league appearances and goals

Davide Facchin (born 29 April 1987) is an Italian former footballer who played as a goalkeeper.

== Club career ==
After spending six years at Milan in their youth teams, Facchin was loaned out to Olbia for the 2007–08 season. The young goalkeeper was regularly in the starting line-up throughout the whole season.

The following year he was sent to Padova on another loan spell. This time though, the then 21-year-old was the backup keeper and collected only three appearances.

At the start of the 2009–10 season, Facchin was loaned out for the third time, this time to Pavia. However, he was again employed as the backup keeper and made only four appearances throughout the season. In July 2010 Pavia signed Facchin outright after his contract with Milan expired.

On 31 January 2014 Facchin was signed by South Tyrol in a temporary deal; after the loan falls to Pavia where he will play for another two years; in the summer of 2016 goes to Venezia. Facchin's contract was terminated by mutual consent on 17 June 2019.

On 11 July 2019, he signed a 2-year contract with Como.

On 7 May 2022 he announced his retirement.
