= 2005–06 UEFA Champions League group stage =

The 2005–06 UEFA Champions League group stage matches took place between 13 September and 7 December 2005.

== Teams ==
The 32 teams were divided into four pots. Seeding was determined by the UEFA coefficients. Clubs from the same association were paired up to split the matchdays between Tuesday and Wednesday. Clubs with the same pairing letter would play on different days, ensuring that teams from the same city (e.g. Milan and Internazionale, who also share a stadium) did not play on the same day.

Group winners and runners-up advanced to the first knockout round
Third-placed teams entered the UEFA Cup at the round of 32

Pot 1
Team	Notes	Coeff.
(England) Liverpool		115.864
(Spain) Real Madrid		131.326
(Italy) Milan		121.191
(Spain) Barcelona		117.326
(England) Manchester United		110.864
(Italy) Internazionale		101.191
(Germany) Bayern Munich		97.166
(England) Arsenal		93.864

Pot 2
Team	Notes	Coeff.
(Portugal) Porto		93.739
(Italy) Juventus		93.191
(Netherlands) PSV Eindhoven		84.145
(France) Lyon		81.324
(Greece) Panathinaikos		70.715
(England) Chelsea		68.864
(Spain) Villarreal		58.326
(Netherlands) Ajax		52.145

Pot 3
Team	Notes	Coeff.
(Belgium) Club Brugge		50.476
(Belgium) Anderlecht		47.476
(Greece) Olympiacos		46.715
(Germany) Schalke 04		44.166
(Czech Republic) Sparta Prague		43.223
(France) Lille		41.324
(Scotland) Rangers		40.476
(Germany) Werder Bremen		40.166

Pot 4
Team	Notes	Coeff.
(Portugal) Benfica		36.739
(Norway) Rosenborg		36.665
(Spain) Real Betis		34.326
(Italy) Udinese		30.191
(Turkey) Fenerbahçe		23.872
(Austria) Rapid Wien		15.208
(Switzerland) Thun		6.887
(Slovakia) Artmedia Bratislava		4.850

Notes

1. ^{TH} Champions League title holders (automatic top seed of pot 1)
2. ^{Q3} Winners of the third qualifying round

== Tie-breaking criteria ==
Based on paragraph 4.05 in the UEFA regulations for the current season, if two or more teams are equal on points on completion of the group matches, the following criteria are applied to determine the rankings:

1. higher number of points obtained in the group matches played among the teams in question;
2. superior goal difference from the group matches played among the teams in question;
3. higher number of goals scored away from home in the group matches played among the teams in question;
4. superior goal difference from all group matches played;
5. higher number of goals scored in all group matches played;
6. higher number of coefficient points accumulated by the club in question, as well as its association, over the previous five seasons.

== Groups ==
Times are CET/CEST, (Note: CET (UTC+1) for matches from 1 November 2005, and CEST (UTC+2) for matches to 19 October 2005.) as listed by UEFA (local times, if different, are in parentheses).

=== Group A ===
Pos	Team	Pld	W	D	L	GF	GA	GD	Pts	Qualification	JUV	BAY	BRU	RWI
1	(Italy) Juventus	6	5	0	1	12	5	+7	15	Advance to knockout stage	—	2–1	1–0	3–0
2	(Germany) Bayern Munich	6	4	1	1	10	4	+6	13	Advance to knockout stage	2–1	—	1–0	4–0
3	(Belgium) Club Brugge	6	2	1	3	6	7	−1	7	Transfer to UEFA Cup	1–2	1–1	—	3–2
4	(Austria) Rapid Wien	6	0	0	6	3	15	−12	0		1–3	0–1	0–1	—

Source: RSSSF
14 September 2005
20:45

Rapid Wien (Austria)	0–1	(Germany) Bayern Munich
	Report	Guerrero 60'

Ernst-Happel-Stadion, Vienna
Attendance: 47,540
Referee: Alain Sars (France)
14 September 2005
20:45

Club Brugge (Belgium)	1–2	(Italy) Juventus
Yulu-Matondo 85'	Report	Nedvěd 66'; Trezeguet 75'

Jan Breydel Stadium, Bruges
Attendance: 27,886
Referee: Luis Medina Cantalejo (Spain)

27 September 2005
20:45

Juventus (Italy)	3–0	(Austria) Rapid Wien
Trezeguet 27'; Mutu 82'; Ibrahimović 85'	Report

Stadio delle Alpi, Turin
Attendance: 11,156
Referee: Martin Hansson (Sweden)
27 September 2005
20:45

Bayern Munich (Germany)	1–0	(Belgium) Club Brugge
Demichelis 32'	Report

Allianz Arena, Munich
Attendance: 66,000
Referee: Tom Henning Øvrebø (Norway)

18 October 2005
20:45

Bayern Munich (Germany)	2–1	(Italy) Juventus
Deisler 32'; Demichelis 39'	Report	Ibrahimović 90'

Allianz Arena, Munich
Attendance: 66,000
Referee: Kyros Vassaras (Greece)
18 October 2005
20:45

Rapid Wien (Austria)	0–1	(Belgium) Club Brugge
	Report	Balaban 75'

Ernst-Happel-Stadion, Vienna
Attendance: 43,200
Referee: Stuart Dougal (Scotland)

2 November 2005
20:45

Juventus (Italy)	2–1	(Germany) Bayern Munich
Trezeguet 62', 85'	Report	Deisler 66'

Stadio delle Alpi, Turin
Attendance: 16,076
Referee: Ľuboš Micheľ (Slovakia)
2 November 2005
20:45

Club Brugge (Belgium)	3–2	(Austria) Rapid Wien
Portillo 6'; Balaban 25'; Verheyen 63'	Report	Kincl 1'; Hofmann 81'

Jan Breydel Stadium, Bruges
Attendance: 27,541
Referee: Alon Yefet (Israel)

22 November 2005
20:45

Bayern Munich (Germany)	4–0	(Austria) Rapid Wien
Deisler 21'; Karimi 54'; Makaay 72', 77'	Report

Allianz Arena, Munich
Attendance: 66,000
Referee: Arturo Daudén Ibáñez (Spain)
22 November 2005
20:45

Juventus (Italy)	1–0	(Belgium) Club Brugge
Del Piero 80'	Report

Stadio delle Alpi, Turin
Attendance: 9,623
Referee: Rob Styles (England)

7 December 2005
20:45

Rapid Wien (Austria)	1–3	(Italy) Juventus
Kincl 52'	Report	Del Piero 35', 45'; Ibrahimović 42'

Ernst-Happel-Stadion, Vienna
Attendance: 45,524
Referee: Jaroslav Jára (Czech Republic)
7 December 2005
20:45

Club Brugge (Belgium)	1–1	(Germany) Bayern Munich
Portillo 32'	Report	Pizarro 21'

Jan Breydel Stadium, Bruges
Attendance: 27,860
Referee: Laurent Duhamel (France)

=== Group B ===
Pos	Team	Pld	W	D	L	GF	GA	GD	Pts	Qualification	ARS	AJX	THU	SPP
1	(England) Arsenal	6	5	1	0	10	2	+8	16	Advance to knockout stage	—	0–0	2–1	3–0
2	(Netherlands) Ajax	6	3	2	1	10	6	+4	11	Advance to knockout stage	1–2	—	2–0	2–1
3	(Switzerland) Thun	6	1	1	4	4	9	−5	4	Transfer to UEFA Cup	0–1	2–4	—	1–0
4	(Czech Republic) Sparta Prague	6	0	2	4	2	9	−7	2		0–2	1–1	0–0	—

Source: RSSSF
14 September 2005
20:45

Sparta Prague (Czech Republic)	1–1	(Netherlands) Ajax
Matušovič 66'	Report	Sneijder 90+1'

Letná Stadium, Prague
Attendance: 15,386
Referee: Claus Bo Larsen (Denmark)
14 September 2005
20:45 (19:45 UTC+1)

Arsenal (England)	2–1	(Switzerland) Thun
Gilberto 51'; Bergkamp 90+2'	Report	Ferreira 53'

Highbury, London
Attendance: 34,498
Referee: Grzegorz Gilewski (Poland)

27 September 2005
20:45

Thun (Switzerland)	1–0	(Czech Republic) Sparta Prague
Hodžić 89'	Report

Stade de Suisse, Bern
Attendance: 30,783
Referee: Bertrand Layec (France)
27 September 2005
20:45

Ajax (Netherlands)	1–2	(England) Arsenal
Rosenberg 71'	Report	Ljungberg 2'; Pires 69' (pen.)

Amsterdam Arena, Amsterdam
Attendance: 47,820
Referee: Luis Medina Cantalejo (Spain)

18 October 2005
20:45

Ajax (Netherlands)	2–0	(Switzerland) Thun
Anastasiou 36', 55'	Report

Amsterdam Arena, Amsterdam
Attendance: 44,772
Referee: Roberto Rosetti (Italy)
18 October 2005
20:45

Sparta Prague (Czech Republic)	0–2	(England) Arsenal
	Report	Henry 21', 74'

Letná Stadium, Prague
Attendance: 12,528
Referee: Wolfgang Stark (Germany)

2 November 2005
20:45

Thun (Switzerland)	2–4	(Netherlands) Ajax
Lustrinelli 56'; Adriano 74'	Report	Sneijder 27'; Anastasiou 63'; De Jong 90+1'; Boukhari 90+3'

Stade de Suisse, Bern
Attendance: 30,919
Referee: Vladimír Hriňák (Slovakia)
2 November 2005
20:45 (19:45 UTC+0)

Arsenal (England)	3–0	(Czech Republic) Sparta Prague
Henry 23'; Van Persie 82', 86'	Report

Highbury, London
Attendance: 35,155
Referee: Alain Sars (France)

22 November 2005
20:45

Ajax (Netherlands)	2–1	(Czech Republic) Sparta Prague
De Jong 68', 89'	Report	M. Petráš 90'

Amsterdam Arena, Amsterdam
Attendance: 46,158
Referee: Valentin Ivanov (Russia)
22 November 2005
20:45

Thun (Switzerland)	0–1	(England) Arsenal
	Report	Pires 88' (pen.)

Stade de Suisse, Bern
Attendance: 31,330
Referee: Lucílio Batista (Portugal)

7 December 2005
20:45

Sparta Prague (Czech Republic)	0–0	(Switzerland) Thun
	Report

Letná Stadium, Prague
Attendance: 9,233
Referee: Mike Riley (England)
7 December 2005
20:45 (19:45 UTC+0)

Arsenal (England)	0–0	(Netherlands) Ajax
	Report

Highbury, London
Attendance: 35,376
Referee: Eduardo Iturralde González (Spain)

=== Group C ===
Pos	Team	Pld	W	D	L	GF	GA	GD	Pts	Qualification	BAR	BRM	UDI	PAN
1	(Spain) Barcelona	6	5	1	0	16	2	+14	16	Advance to knockout stage	—	3–1	4–1	5–0
2	(Germany) Werder Bremen	6	2	1	3	12	12	0	7	Advance to knockout stage	0–2	—	4–3	5–1
3	(Italy) Udinese	6	2	1	3	10	12	−2	7	Transfer to UEFA Cup	0–2	1–1	—	3–0
4	(Greece) Panathinaikos	6	1	1	4	4	16	−12	4		0–0	2–1	1–2	—

Source: RSSSF
14 September 2005
20:45

Udinese (Italy)	3–0	(Greece) Panathinaikos
Iaquinta 28', 73', 76'	Report

Stadio Friuli, Udine
Attendance: 21,398
Referee: Olegário Benquerença (Portugal)
14 September 2005
20:45

Werder Bremen (Germany)	0–2	(Spain) Barcelona
	Report	Deco 13'; Ronaldinho 76' (pen.)

Weserstadion, Bremen
Attendance: 37,000
Referee: Terje Hauge (Norway)

27 September 2005
20:45

Barcelona (Spain)	4–1	(Italy) Udinese
Ronaldinho 13', 32', 90' (pen.); Deco 41'	Report	Felipe 24'

Camp Nou, Barcelona
Attendance: 74,730
Referee: Stephen Bennett (England)
27 September 2005
20:45 (21:45 UTC+3)

Panathinaikos (Greece)	2–1	(Germany) Werder Bremen
González 5' (pen.); Mantzios 8'	Report	Klose 41'

Olympic Stadium, Athens
Attendance: 31,450
Referee: Eric Poulat (France)

18 October 2005
20:45 (21:45 UTC+3)

Panathinaikos (Greece)	0–0	(Spain) Barcelona
	Report

Olympic Stadium, Athens
Attendance: 56,804
Referee: Frank De Bleeckere (Belgium)
18 October 2005
20:45

Udinese (Italy)	1–1	(Germany) Werder Bremen
Di Natale 86'	Report	Felipe 64' (o.g.)

Stadio Friuli, Udine
Attendance: 20,335
Referee: Rene Temmink (Netherlands)

2 November 2005
20:45

Barcelona (Spain)	5–0	(Greece) Panathinaikos
Van Bommel 1'; Eto'o 14', 40', 65'; Messi 34'	Report

Camp Nou, Barcelona
Attendance: 64,321
Referee: Rene Temmink (Netherlands)
2 November 2005
20:45

Werder Bremen (Germany)	4–3	(Italy) Udinese
Klose 15'; Baumann 24'; Micoud 51', 67'	Report	Di Natale 54', 57'; Schulz 60' (o.g.)

Weserstadion, Bremen
Attendance: 35,424
Referee: Yuri Baskakov (Russia)

22 November 2005
20:45 (21:45 UTC+2)

Panathinaikos (Greece)	1–2	(Italy) Udinese
Charalambidis 45+1'	Report	Iaquinta 81'; Candela 83'

Olympic Stadium, Athens
Attendance: 30,147
Referee: Graham Poll (England)
22 November 2005
20:45

Barcelona (Spain)	3–1	(Germany) Werder Bremen
Gabri 14'; Ronaldinho 26'; Larsson 71'	Report	Borowski 22' (pen.)

Camp Nou, Barcelona
Attendance: 67,273
Referee: Claus Bo Larsen (Denmark)

7 December 2005
20:45

Udinese (Italy)	0–2	(Spain) Barcelona
	Report	Ezquerro 85'; Iniesta 90'

Stadio Friuli, Udine
Attendance: 33,570
Referee: Eric Braamhaar (Netherlands)
7 December 2005
20:45

Werder Bremen (Germany)	5–1	(Greece) Panathinaikos
Micoud 2' (pen.); Valdez 28', 31'; Klose 51'; Frings 90+1'	Report	Morris 53'

Weserstadion, Bremen
Attendance: 36,550
Referee: Peter Fröjdfeldt (Sweden)

=== Group D ===
Pos	Team	Pld	W	D	L	GF	GA	GD	Pts	Qualification	VIL	BEN	LIL	MUN
1	(Spain) Villarreal	6	2	4	0	3	1	+2	10	Advance to knockout stage	—	1–1	1–0	0–0
2	(Portugal) Benfica	6	2	2	2	5	5	0	8	Advance to knockout stage	0–1	—	1–0	2–1
3	(France) Lille	6	1	3	2	1	2	−1	6	Transfer to UEFA Cup	0–0	0–0	—	1–0
4	(England) Manchester United	6	1	3	2	3	4	−1	6		0–0	2–1	0–0	—

Source: RSSSF
14 September 2005
20:45

Villarreal (Spain)	0–0	(England) Manchester United
	Report

Estadio El Madrigal, Villarreal
Attendance: 19,550
Referee: Kim Milton Nielsen (Denmark)
14 September 2005
20:45 (19:45 UTC+1)

Benfica (Portugal)	1–0	(France) Lille
Miccoli 90+2'	Report

Estádio da Luz, Lisbon
Attendance: 32,176
Referee: Rene Temmink (Netherlands)

27 September 2005
20:45

Lille (France)	0–0	(Spain) Villarreal
	Report

Stade de France, Saint-Denis
Attendance: 35,153
Referee: Peter Fröjdfeldt (Sweden)
27 September 2005
20:45 (19:45 UTC+1)

Manchester United (England)	2–1	(Portugal) Benfica
Giggs 35'; Van Nistelrooy 85'	Report	Simão 59'

Old Trafford, Manchester
Attendance: 66,112
Referee: Ľuboš Micheľ (Slovakia)

18 October 2005
20:45 (19:45 UTC+1)

Manchester United (England)	0–0	(France) Lille
	Report

Old Trafford, Manchester
Attendance: 60,626
Referee: Stefano Farina (Italy)
18 October 2005
20:45

Villarreal (Spain)	1–1	(Portugal) Benfica
Riquelme 72' (pen.)	Report	Fernandes 77'

Estadio El Madrigal, Villarreal
Attendance: 15,072
Referee: Florian Meyer (Germany)

2 November 2005
20:45

Lille (France)	1–0	(England) Manchester United
Ačimovič 38'	Report

Stade de France, Saint-Denis
Attendance: 66,470
Referee: Markus Merk (Germany)
2 November 2005
20:45 (19:45 UTC+0)

Benfica (Portugal)	0–1	(Spain) Villarreal
	Report	Senna 81'

Estádio da Luz, Lisbon
Attendance: 48,014
Referee: Frank De Bleeckere (Belgium)

22 November 2005
20:45 (19:45 UTC+0)

Manchester United (England)	0–0	(Spain) Villarreal
	Report

Old Trafford, Manchester
Attendance: 67,471
Referee: Massimo De Santis (Italy)
22 November 2005
20:45

Lille (France)	0–0	(Portugal) Benfica
	Report

Stade de France, Saint-Denis
Attendance: 76,187
Referee: Massimo Busacca (Switzerland)

7 December 2005
20:45

Villarreal (Spain)	1–0	(France) Lille
Guayre 67'	Report

Estadio El Madrigal, Villarreal
Attendance: 15,751
Referee: Valentin Ivanov (Russia)
7 December 2005
20:45 (19:45 UTC+0)

Benfica (Portugal)	2–1	(England) Manchester United
Geovanni 16'; Beto 34'	Report	Scholes 6'

Estádio da Luz, Lisbon
Attendance: 62,174
Referee: Kyros Vassaras (Greece)

=== Group E ===
Pos	Team	Pld	W	D	L	GF	GA	GD	Pts	Qualification	MIL	PSV	SCH	FEN
1	(Italy) Milan	6	3	2	1	12	6	+6	11	Advance to knockout stage	—	0–0	3–2	3–1
2	(Netherlands) PSV Eindhoven	6	3	1	2	4	6	−2	10	Advance to knockout stage	1–0	—	1–0	2–0
3	(Germany) Schalke 04	6	2	2	2	12	9	+3	8	Transfer to UEFA Cup	2–2	3–0	—	2–0
4	(Turkey) Fenerbahçe	6	1	1	4	7	14	−7	4		0–4	3–0	3–3	—

Source: RSSSF
13 September 2005
20:45

Milan (Italy)	3–1	(Turkey) Fenerbahçe
Kaká 18', 87'; Shevchenko 89'	Report	Alex 63' (pen.)

San Siro, Milan
Attendance: 34,619
Referee: Mike Riley (England)
13 September 2005
20:45

PSV Eindhoven (Netherlands)	1–0	(Germany) Schalke 04
Vennegoor of Hesselink 33'	Report

Philips Stadion, Eindhoven
Attendance: 33,000
Referee: Yuri Baskakov (Russia)

28 September 2005
20:45

Schalke 04 (Germany)	2–2	(Italy) Milan
Larsen 3'; Altıntop 70'	Report	Seedorf 1'; Shevchenko 59'

Veltins-Arena, Gelsenkirchen
Attendance: 53,425
Referee: Claus Bo Larsen (Denmark)
28 September 2005
20:45 (21:45 UTC+3)

Fenerbahçe (Turkey)	3–0	(Netherlands) PSV Eindhoven
Alex 40' (pen.), 68'; Appiah 90+2'	Report

Şükrü Saracoğlu Stadium, Istanbul
Attendance: 37,079
Referee: Manuel Mejuto González (Spain)

19 October 2005
20:45 (21:45 UTC+3)

Fenerbahçe (Turkey)	3–3	(Germany) Schalke 04
Fábio 14'; Márcio 73'; Appiah 79'	Report	Lincoln 59', 62'; Kurányi 77'

Şükrü Saracoğlu Stadium, Istanbul
Attendance: 38,118
Referee: Alain Hamer (Luxembourg)
19 October 2005
20:45

Milan (Italy)	0–0	(Netherlands) PSV Eindhoven
	Report

San Siro, Milan
Attendance: 39,298
Referee: Konrad Plautz (Austria)

1 November 2005
20:45

Schalke 04 (Germany)	2–0	(Turkey) Fenerbahçe
Kurányi 32'; Sand 90+2'	Report

Veltins-Arena, Gelsenkirchen
Attendance: 53,993
Referee: Luis Medina Cantalejo (Spain)
1 November 2005
20:45

PSV Eindhoven (Netherlands)	1–0	(Italy) Milan
Farfán 12'	Report

Philips Stadion, Eindhoven
Attendance: 35,100
Referee: Graham Poll (England)

23 November 2005
20:45 (21:45 UTC+2)

Fenerbahçe (Turkey)	0–4	(Italy) Milan
	Report	Shevchenko 16', 52', 70', 76'

Şükrü Saracoğlu Stadium, Istanbul
Attendance: 42,928
Referee: Terje Hauge (Norway)
23 November 2005
20:45

Schalke 04 (Germany)	3–0	(Netherlands) PSV Eindhoven
Kobiashvili 18' (pen.), 72', 79' (pen.)	Report

Veltins-Arena, Gelsenkirchen
Attendance: 53,994
Referee: Ľuboš Micheľ (Slovakia)

6 December 2005
20:45

Milan (Italy)	3–2	(Germany) Schalke 04
Pirlo 42'; Kaká 52', 60'	Report	Poulsen 44'; Lincoln 66'

San Siro, Milan
Attendance: 43,816
Referee: Manuel Mejuto González (Spain)
6 December 2005
20:45

PSV Eindhoven (Netherlands)	2–0	(Turkey) Fenerbahçe
Cocu 14'; Farfán 85'	Report

Philips Stadion, Eindhoven
Attendance: 34,000
Referee: Eric Poulat (France)

=== Group F ===
Pos	Team	Pld	W	D	L	GF	GA	GD	Pts	Qualification	LYO	RMA	ROS	OLY
1	(France) Lyon	6	5	1	0	13	4	+9	16	Advance to knockout stage	—	3–0	2–1	2–1
2	(Spain) Real Madrid	6	3	1	2	10	8	+2	10	Advance to knockout stage	1–1	—	4–1	2–1
3	(Norway) Rosenborg	6	1	1	4	6	11	−5	4	Transfer to UEFA Cup	0–1	0–2	—	1–1
4	(Greece) Olympiacos	6	1	1	4	7	13	−6	4		1–4	2–1	1–3	—

Source: RSSSF
13 September 2005
20:45

Lyon (France)	3–0	(Spain) Real Madrid
Carew 21'; Juninho 26'; Wiltord 31'	Report

Stade de Gerland, Lyon
Attendance: 40,309
Referee: Massimo De Santis (Italy)
13 September 2005
20:45 (21:45 UTC+3)

Olympiacos (Greece)	1–3	(Norway) Rosenborg
Lago 19' (o.g.)	Report	Skjelbred 42'; Mavrogenidis 48' (o.g.); Storflor 90+4'

Karaiskakis Stadium, Piraeus
Attendance: 33,448
Referee: Stefano Farina (Italy)

28 September 2005
20:45

Rosenborg (Norway)	0–1	(France) Lyon
	Report	Cris 45+1'

Lerkendal Stadion, Trondheim
Attendance: 20,620
Referee: Yuri Baskakov (Russia)
28 September 2005
20:45

Real Madrid (Spain)	2–1	(Greece) Olympiacos
Raúl 9'; Soldado 86'	Report	Kafes 48'

Santiago Bernabéu, Madrid
Attendance: 64,327
Referee: Markus Merk (Germany)

19 October 2005
20:45

Real Madrid (Spain)	4–1	(Norway) Rosenborg
Woodgate 48'; Raúl 52'; Helguera 68'; Beckham 82'	Report	Strand 40'

Santiago Bernabéu, Madrid
Attendance: 64,870
Referee: Steve Bennett (England)
19 October 2005
20:45

Lyon (France)	2–1	(Greece) Olympiacos
Juninho 4'; Govou 89'	Report	Kafes 84'

Stade de Gerland, Lyon
Attendance: 38,093
Referee: Graham Poll (England)

1 November 2005
20:45

Rosenborg (Norway)	0–2	(Spain) Real Madrid
	Report	Dorsin 26' (o.g.); Guti 41'

Lerkendal Stadion, Trondheim
Attendance: 21,270
Referee: Wolfgang Stark (Germany)
1 November 2005
20:45 (21:45 UTC+2)

Olympiacos (Greece)	1–4	(France) Lyon
Babangida 3'	Report	Juninho 41'; Carew 44', 57'; Diarra 55'

Karaiskakis Stadium, Piraeus
Attendance: 30,848
Referee: Peter Fröjdfeldt (Sweden)

23 November 2005
20:45

Real Madrid (Spain)	1–1	(France) Lyon
Guti 41'	Report	Carew 72'

Santiago Bernabéu, Madrid
Attendance: 67,304
Referee: Frank De Bleeckere (Belgium)
23 November 2005
20:45

Rosenborg (Norway)	1–1	(Greece) Olympiacos
Helstad 88'	Report	Rivaldo 25'

Lerkendal Stadion, Trondheim
Attendance: 21,270
Referee: Paul Allaerts (Belgium)

6 December 2005
20:45

Lyon (France)	2–1	(Norway) Rosenborg
Benzema 33'; Fred 90+3'	Report	Braaten 68'

Stade de Gerland, Lyon
Attendance: 40,425
Referee: Arturo Daudén Ibáñez (Spain)
6 December 2005
20:45 (21:45 UTC+2)

Olympiacos (Greece)	2–1	(Spain) Real Madrid
Bulut 50'; Rivaldo 87'	Report	Ramos 7'

Karaiskakis Stadium, Piraeus
Attendance: 30,496
Referee: Kim Milton Nielsen (Denmark)

=== Group G ===
Pos	Team	Pld	W	D	L	GF	GA	GD	Pts	Qualification	LIV	CHE	BET	AND
1	(England) Liverpool	6	3	3	0	6	1	+5	12	Advance to knockout stage	—	0–0	0–0	3–0
2	(England) Chelsea	6	3	2	1	7	1	+6	11	Advance to knockout stage	0–0	—	4–0	1–0
3	(Spain) Real Betis	6	2	1	3	3	7	−4	7	Transfer to UEFA Cup	1–2	1–0	—	0–1
4	(Belgium) Anderlecht	6	1	0	5	1	8	−7	3		0–1	0–2	0–1	—

Source: RSSSF
13 September 2005
20:45 (19:45 UTC+1)

Chelsea (England)	1–0	(Belgium) Anderlecht
Lampard 19'	Report

Stamford Bridge, London
Attendance: 29,574
Referee: Wolfgang Stark (Germany)
13 September 2005
20:45

Real Betis (Spain)	1–2	(England) Liverpool
Arzu 51'	Report	Sinama Pongolle 2'; García 14'

Estadio Manuel Ruiz de Lopera, Seville
Attendance: 34,862
Referee: Konrad Plautz (Austria)

28 September 2005
20:45 (19:45 UTC+1)

Liverpool (England)	0–0	(England) Chelsea
	Report

Anfield, Liverpool
Attendance: 42,743
Referee: Massimo De Santis (Italy)
28 September 2005
20:45

Anderlecht (Belgium)	0–1	(Spain) Real Betis
	Report	Oliveira 69'

Constant Vanden Stock Stadium, Brussels
Attendance: 21,078
Referee: Roberto Rosetti (Italy)

19 October 2005
20:45

Anderlecht (Belgium)	0–1	(England) Liverpool
	Report	Cissé 20'

Constant Vanden Stock Stadium, Brussels
Attendance: 21,824
Referee: Massimo Busacca (Switzerland)
19 October 2005
20:45 (19:45 UTC+1)

Chelsea (England)	4–0	(Spain) Real Betis
Drogba 24'; Carvalho 44'; J. Cole 59'; Crespo 64'	Report

Stamford Bridge, London
Attendance: 36,457
Referee: Terje Hauge (Norway)

1 November 2005
20:45 (19:45 UTC+0)

Liverpool (England)	3–0	(Belgium) Anderlecht
Morientes 34'; García 61'; Cissé 89'	Report

Anfield, Liverpool
Attendance: 42,607
Referee: Kim Milton Nielsen (Denmark)
1 November 2005
20:45

Real Betis (Spain)	1–0	(England) Chelsea
Dani 28'	Report

Estadio Manuel Ruiz de Lopera, Seville
Attendance: 34,131
Referee: Alain Hamer (Luxembourg)

23 November 2005
20:45

Anderlecht (Belgium)	0–2	(England) Chelsea
	Report	Crespo 8'; Carvalho 15'

Constant Vanden Stock Stadium, Brussels
Attendance: 21,070
Referee: Stefano Farina (Italy)
23 November 2005
20:45 (19:45 UTC+0)

Liverpool (England)	0–0	(Spain) Real Betis
	Report

Anfield, Liverpool
Attendance: 42,077
Referee: Eric Poulat (France)

6 December 2005
20:45 (19:45 UTC+0)

Chelsea (England)	0–0	(England) Liverpool
	Report

Stamford Bridge, London
Attendance: 41,598
Referee: Herbert Fandel (Germany)
6 December 2005
20:45

Real Betis (Spain)	0–1	(Belgium) Anderlecht
	Report	Kompany 44'

Estadio Manuel Ruiz de Lopera, Seville
Attendance: 24,277
Referee: Darko Čeferin (Slovenia)

=== Group H ===
Pos	Team	Pld	W	D	L	GF	GA	GD	Pts	Qualification	INT	RAN	ART	POR
1	(Italy) Internazionale	6	4	1	1	9	4	+5	13	Advance to knockout stage	—	1–0	4–0	2–1
2	(Scotland) Rangers	6	1	4	1	7	7	0	7	Advance to knockout stage	1–1	—	0–0	3–2
3	(Slovakia) Artmedia Bratislava	6	1	3	2	5	9	−4	6	Transfer to UEFA Cup	0–1	2–2	—	0–0
4	(Portugal) Porto	6	1	2	3	8	9	−1	5		2–0	1–1	2–3	—

Source: RSSSF
13 September 2005
20:45 (19:45 UTC+1)

Rangers (Scotland)	3–2	(Portugal) Porto
Løvenkrands 35'; Pršo 59'; Kyrgiakos 85'	Report	Pepe 47', 71'

Ibrox Stadium, Glasgow
Attendance: 48,599
Referee: Jan Wegereef (Netherlands)
13 September 2005
20:45

Artmedia Bratislava (Slovakia)	0–1	(Italy) Internazionale
	Report	Cruz 17'

Tehelné pole, Bratislava
Attendance: 27,000
Referee: Eric Poulat (France)

28 September 2005
20:45

Internazionale (Italy)	1–0	(Scotland) Rangers
Pizarro 49'	Report

San Siro, Milan
Attendance: 0 (Note: Match played behind closed doors as Inter were serving a punishment for spectators' misconduct in the previous season's Champions League quarter-final match against Milan.)
Referee: Kyros Vassaras (Greece)
28 September 2005
20:45 (19:45 UTC+1)

Porto (Portugal)	2–3	(Slovakia) Artmedia Bratislava
González 32'; Diego 39'	Report	P. Petráš 45+1'; Kozák 54'; Borbély 74'

Estádio do Dragão, Porto
Attendance: 38,708
Referee: Massimo Busacca (Switzerland)

19 October 2005
20:45 (19:45 UTC+1)

Porto (Portugal)	2–0	(Italy) Internazionale
Materazzi 22' (o.g.); McCarthy 35'	Report

Estádio do Dragão, Porto
Attendance: 38,418
Referee: Valentin Ivanov (Russia)
19 October 2005
20:45 (19:45 UTC+1)

Rangers (Scotland)	0–0	(Slovakia) Artmedia Bratislava
	Report

Ibrox Stadium, Glasgow
Attendance: 49,013
Referee: Arturo Daudén Ibáñez (Spain)

1 November 2005
20:45

Internazionale (Italy)	2–1	(Portugal) Porto
Cruz 75' (pen.), 82'	Report	Almeida 16'

San Siro, Milan
Attendance: 0
Referee: Manuel Mejuto González (Spain)
1 November 2005
20:45

Artmedia Bratislava (Slovakia)	2–2	(Scotland) Rangers
Borbély 8'; Kozák 59'	Report	Pršo 3'; Thompson 44'

Tehelné pole, Bratislava
Attendance: 19,492
Referee: Florian Meyer (Germany)

23 November 2005
20:45 (19:45 UTC+0)

Porto (Portugal)	1–1	(Scotland) Rangers
López 60'	Report	McCormack 83'

Estádio do Dragão, Porto
Attendance: 39,439
Referee: Herbert Fandel (Germany)
23 November 2005
20:45

Internazionale (Italy)	4–0	(Slovakia) Artmedia Bratislava
Figo 28'; Adriano 41', 59', 74'	Report

San Siro, Milan
Attendance: 0
Referee: Mike Riley (England)

6 December 2005
20:45 (19:45 UTC+0)

Rangers (Scotland)	1–1	(Italy) Internazionale
Løvenkrands 38'	Report	Adriano 30'

Ibrox Stadium, Glasgow
Attendance: 49,150
Referee: Konrad Plautz (Austria)
6 December 2005
20:45

Artmedia Bratislava (Slovakia)	0–0	(Portugal) Porto
	Report

Tehelné pole, Bratislava
Attendance: 9,542
Referee: Markus Merk (Germany)
