= Konrad Plautz =

Austrian football referee

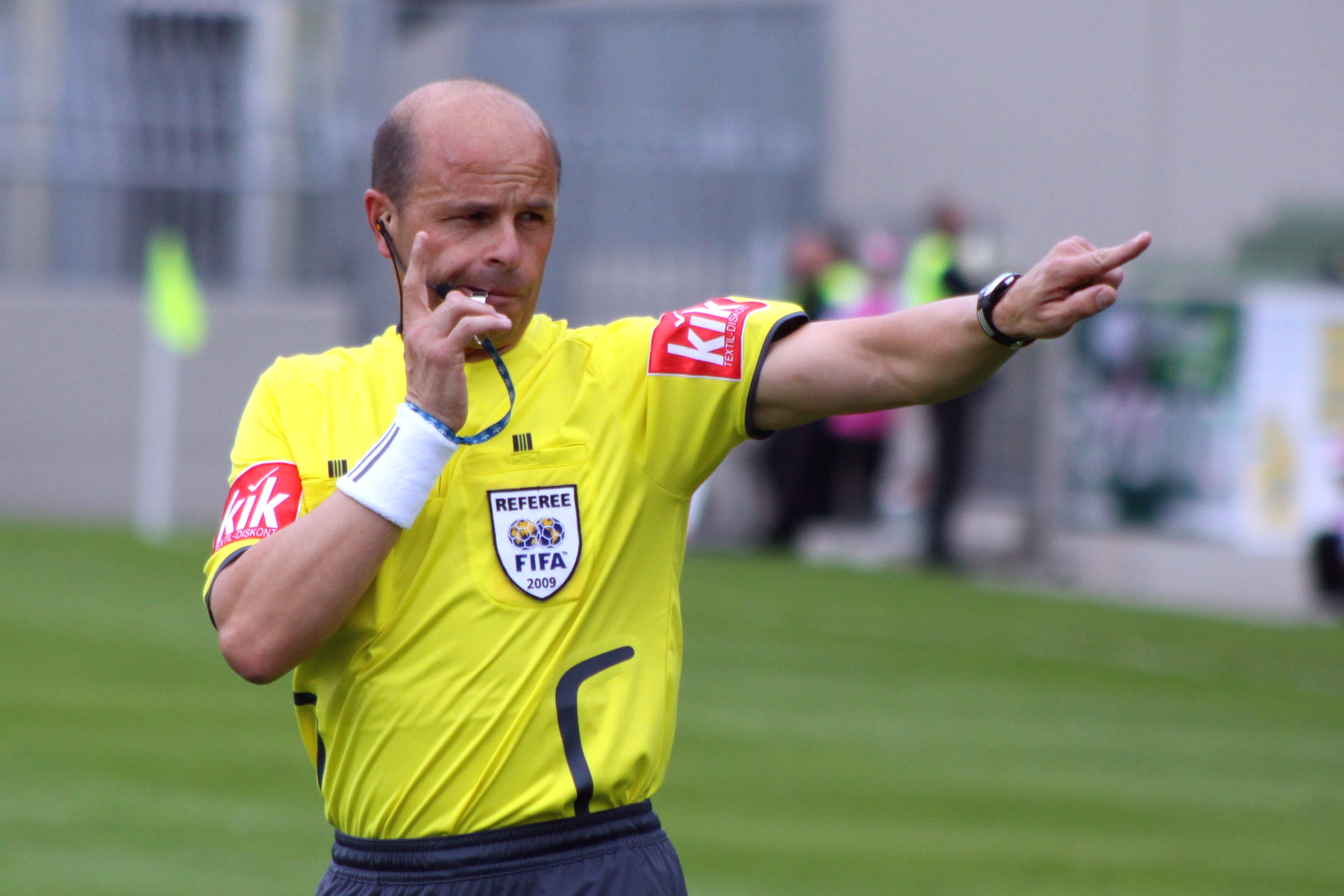
Konrad Plautz

Konrad Plautz (born 16 October 1964 in Navis) is a football referee from Austria. He has officiated internationally since 1996.

Konrad Plautz took up refereeing as a teenager, feeling that handling games gave him more satisfaction than actually playing at right-back, where he struggled. He set himself a ten-year target for reaching the upper levels of the profession and just missed out, making his debut in the Austrian Bundesliga in 1992. He was awarded his FIFA badge in 1996 and, in that same year, was named to handle the European Under-16 Championship final in Vienna, where Portugal beat France to take the title.

Plautz has been a top performer in fitness tests – he counterbalances his physical activity with the roles of director and actor for a local theatrical group.

He was appointed by UEFA as one of twelve referees at officiate UEFA Euro 2008.
