= Terje Hauge =

Norwegian football referee (born 1965)

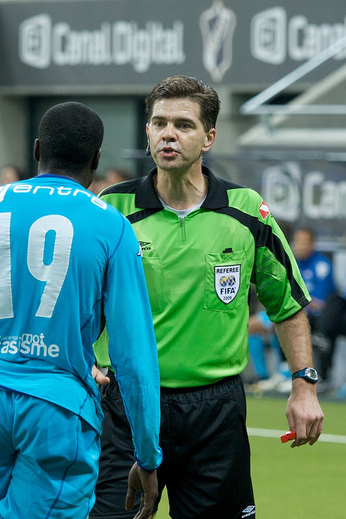
- Hauge in 2009
- Born: 5 October 1965 (age 60); Bergen, Norway
- Occupations: Football referee, referee advisor

Terje Hauge (born 5 October 1965) is a Norwegian former football referee from the club Olsvik IL.

== Career ==
Since he made his debut in 1990, Hauge has refereed 232 matches in the Tippeligaen. He has been an authorised FIFA referee since 1993. He won the Kniksen award as referee of the year in the Tippeligaen in 2004, 2007 and 2010. Hauge was ranked as an Elite referee in the UEFA Referees Categories, until the end of his international career.

- Matches refereed in the Tippeligaen: 301
- Matches refereed in the European cups: 50+
- Matches refereed for National teams: 50+

Hauge has also refereed in the 2002 World Cup, Euro 2000 (4th referee), Euro 2004 and the 1996 and 2003 Norwegian cup finals. He also refereed the UEFA Super Cup match between FC Porto and Valencia CF at the Stade Louis II in Monaco on 27 August 2004.

Hauge was not selected to referee at the Euro 2008 tournament however, his fellow countryman and colleague Tom Henning Øvrebø given the honor instead. This marked the first time Øvrebø was selected over Hauge to referee at a major tournament.

He also refereed the 2005 Ukrainian Cup Final and the 2005 FIFA World Youth Championship final in the Netherlands.

In a UEFA Champions League tie between Chelsea and Barcelona, Hauge sent off Chelsea defender Asier del Horno for a challenge on Barcelona's Lionel Messi, and Chelsea eventually slipped to a 2–1 defeat. After the match Hauge received death threats from Chelsea fans, but stood by his decision.

On 17 May 2006, Terje Hauge became the first Norwegian referee to referee in a UEFA Champions League Final. He took charge of the match between Arsenal and Barcelona at the Stade de France in Paris. During the match, he created history when he showed a red card to goalkeeper Jens Lehmann of Arsenal, making Lehmann the first player ever to be sent off in a Champions League Final. Hauge later regretted the decision, saying that he should have allowed the goal that Ludovic Giuly had scored moments earlier.
