= 2004–05 Juventus FC season =

Italian football club season

Juventus
2004–05 season
- President: Franzo Grande Stevens
- Manager: Fabio Capello
- Stadium: Stadio delle Alpi
- Serie A: 1st (stripped of the title)
- Coppa Italia: Round of 16
- UEFA Champions League: Quarter-finals
- Top goalscorer: League: Zlatan Ibrahimović (16); All: Alessandro Del Piero (17)
- Average home league attendance: 26,429
Home colours	Away colours	Third colours

The 2004–05 season was Juventus's 107th in existence and 103rd consecutive season in the top flight of Italian football. Juventus won the league title for the 28th time in this season; the following year, Juventus were stripped of this title and sent to Serie B due to the Calciopoli scandal.

== Season summary ==
Juventus Football Club returned to domestic glory in the first season under Fabio Capello's reign. The former Juventus midfielder had a positive influence on the Juventus squad, and it seemed as though he had led the club to its 28th league title. However, that was all to change a year afterwards when Calciopoli sent Juventus to Serie B.

On the pitch in 2004–05, Swedish signing Zlatan Ibrahimović was the biggest positive surprise. Not known as an outright goalscorer at previous club Ajax, Ibrahimović hit the back of the net 16 times in his debut Serie A season. Another signing, Fabio Cannavaro, gave the team the stability it had lacked in the 2003–04 season, and helped the defense to be rock-solid. Juventus conceded just 27 goals throughout the league season and this, combined with the 67 goals scored, gave the club both the best defence and best attack of 2004–05 in Italy.

The lowest point of the season was not being able to get past Liverpool in the quarter-finals Champions League. Sami Hyypiä and Luis García scored early goals at Anfield, from which Juventus could not recover, despite a second half goal by Fabio Cannavaro that meant they could go through to a semi-final showdown with Chelsea if they won the return leg in Turin just 1–0. In this second leg, Ibrahimović missed a golden chance when all he had to do was turn in a Gianluca Zambrotta cross. After that, Juventus failed to pose any threat to the well-organized English side. Liverpool would go on to win the competition.

== Players ==
=== Squad information ===
Note: Flags indicate national team as defined under FIFA eligibility rules; some limited exceptions apply. Players may hold more than one non-FIFA nationality.

No.	Pos.	Nation	Player
1	GK	ITA	Gianluigi Buffon
2	DF	ITA	Ciro Ferrara
3	MF	ITA	Alessio Tacchinardi
4	DF	URU	Paolo Montero
5	MF	CRO	Igor Tudor
6	DF	ITA	Nicola Legrottaglie
7	DF	ITA	Gianluca Pessotto
8	MF	BRA	Emerson
9	FW	SWE	Zlatan Ibrahimović
10	FW	ITA	Alessandro Del Piero (captain)
11	MF	CZE	Pavel Nedvěd
13	DF	ITA	Mark Iuliano
15	DF	ITA	Alessandro Birindelli
16	MF	ITA	Mauro Camoranesi
17	FW	FRA	David Trezeguet

No.	Pos.	Nation	Player
18	MF	GHA	Stephen Appiah
19	DF	ITA	Gianluca Zambrotta
20	MF	ITA	Manuele Blasi
21	DF	FRA	Lilian Thuram
22	GK	FRA	Landry Bonnefoi
23	FW	FRA	Olivier Kapo
24	MF	URU	Rubén Olivera
25	FW	URU	Marcelo Zalayeta
27	DF	FRA	Jonathan Zebina
28	DF	ITA	Fabio Cannavaro
30	FW	ROU	Adrian Mutu
33	GK	ITA	Antonio Chimenti
34	DF	ITA	Andrea Masiello
36	MF	ITA	Paolo De Ceglie

=== Transfers ===
In
Pos.	Name	from	Type
MF	Emerson Ferreira	Roma	€28 million
FW	Zlatan Ibrahimovic	Ajax	€16 million
DF	Fabio Cannavaro	Internazionale	€10 million
DF	Jonathan Zebina	Roma	free
FW	Olivier Kapo	Auxerre	free
MF	Manuele Blasi	Parma	loan ended
GK	Landry Bonnefoi	Messina	loan ended
MF	Ruben Olivera	Atletico Madrid	loan ended
FW	Marcelo Zalayeta	Perugia	loan ended
MF	Edgar Davids	Barcelona	loan ended
DF	Salvatore Fresi	Perugia	loan ended

Out
Pos.	Name	to	Type
FW	Marco Di Vaio	Valencia	€11 million
GK	Fabián Carini	Internazionale	€10 million
MF	Edgar Davids	Internazionale	free
MF	Antonio Conte		retired
FW	Fabrizio Miccoli	Fiorentina	€7 million
MF	Enzo Maresca	Fiorentina	loan
DF	Salvatore Fresi	Catania	loan
FW	Marcelo Salas	River Plate	free

==== Winter ====
In
Pos.	Name	from	Type
FW	Adrian Mutu	Livorno	free

Out
Pos.	Name	to	Type
DF	Mark Iuliano	Mallorca	loan
DF	Igor Tudor	Siena	loan
DF	Nicola Legrottaglie	Bologna	loan

==== Reserve squad ====
Note: Flags indicate national team as defined under FIFA eligibility rules; some limited exceptions apply. Players may hold more than one non-FIFA nationality.

No.	Pos.	Nation	Player
31	DF	ITA	Domenico Criscito
33	GK	ITA	Claudio Scarzanella
35	MF	ITA	Andrea Rossi
38	FW	ITA	Michele Paolucci

No.	Pos.	Nation	Player
39	MF	ITA	Claudio Marchisio
40	MF	ITA	Simone Bentivoglio
41	MF	ITA	Andrea Luci

== Competitions ==
=== Serie A ===
==== League table ====
Pos	Team	Pld	W	D	L	GF	GA	GD	Pts	Qualification or relegation
1	Juventus (Note: Juventus were stripped of the title during the 2005–06 Serie A season, because of the 2006 Italian football scandal)	38	26	8	4	67	27	+40	86	Qualification to Champions League group stage
2	Milan	38	23	10	5	63	28	+35	79	Qualification to Champions League group stage
3	Internazionale	38	18	18	2	65	37	+28	72	Qualification to Champions League third qualifying round
4	Udinese	38	17	11	10	56	40	+16	62	Qualification to Champions League third qualifying round
5	Sampdoria	38	17	10	11	42	29	+13	61	Qualification to UEFA Cup first round

Source: 2004–05 Serie A, RSSSF.com, Soccerway
Rules for classification: 1) Points; 2) Head-to-head points; 3) Head-to-head goal difference; 4) Goal difference; 5) Goals scored; 6) Draw. (Note: Head-to-head record is used only after all the matches between the teams in question have been played).

==== Results summary ====
Overall								Home						Away					
Pld	W	D	L	GF	GA	GD	Pts	W	D	L	GF	GA	GD	W	D	L	GF	GA	GD
38	26	8	4	67	27	+40	86	15	2	2	38	13	+25	11	6	2	29	14	+15

Last updated: 29 May 2005.
Source: Competitive matches

==== Results by round ====
Round	1	2	3	4	5	6	7	8	9	10	11	12	13	14	15	16	17	18	19	20	21	22	23	24	25	26	27	28	29	30	31	32	33	34	35	36	37	38
Ground	A	H	A	H	A	H	A	H	H	A	H	A	A	H	A	H	A	H	A	H	A	H	A	H	A	H	A	A	H	A	H	H	A	H	A	H	A	H
Result	W	W	W	D	W	W	W	W	W	L	W	W	D	W	W	D	D	W	D	W	W	L	L	W	D	W	W	W	W	D	W	L	W	W	W	W	D	W
Position	1	1	1	1	1	1	1	1	1	1	1	1	1	1	1	1	1	1	1	1	1	1	1	1	2	2	2	2	2	2	1	1	2	2	1	1	1	1

Source: Competitive matches
A = Away; H = Home; W = Win; D = Draw; L = Loss; = Leader, UEFA Champions League Groups stage; = UEFA Champions League Groups stage; = UEFA Champions League Qualifying round; = 2005–06 UEFA Cup; = 2005–06 Serie B

==== Matches ====
12 September 2004 1	Brescia	0–3	Juventus	Brescia
15:00 CEST (UTC+02:00)		Report	Nedvěd 35'; Trezeguet 38'; Ibrahimović 69'	Stadium: Stadio Mario Rigamonti; Attendance: 16,504; Referee: Matteo Trefoloni

19 September 2004 2	Juventus	2–0	Atalanta	Turin
15:00 CEST (UTC+02:00)	Trezeguet 14', 58'	Report		Stadium: Stadio delle Alpi; Attendance: 22,221; Referee: Massimo De Santis

22 September 2004 3	Sampdoria	0–3	Juventus	Genoa
20:30 CEST (UTC+02:00)		Report	Del Piero 19' (pen.); Ibrahimović 69'; Trezeguet 87'	Stadium: Stadio Luigi Ferraris; Attendance: 32,102; Referee: Paolo Donderini

25 September 2004 4	Juventus	1–1	Palermo	Turin
20:30 CEST (UTC+02:00)	Ibrahimović 53'	Report	Zaccardo 17'	Stadium: Stadio delle Alpi; Attendance: 26,790; Referee: Paolo Bertini

3 October 2004 5	Udinese	0–1	Juventus	Udine
15:00 CEST (UTC+02:00)		Report	Zalayeta 60'	Stadium: Stadio Friuli; Attendance: 24,504; Referee: Stefano Farina

16 October 2004 6	Juventus	2–1	Messina	Turin
20:30 CEST (UTC+02:00)	Zalayeta 26'; Nedvěd 54'	Report	Zampagna 69'	Stadium: Stadio delle Alpi; Attendance: 29,622; Referee: Matteo Trefoloni

23 October 2004 7	Siena	0–3	Juventus	Siena
20:30 CEST (UTC+02:00)		Report	Del Piero 53', 60'; Camoranesi 63'	Stadium: Stadio Artemio Franchi – Montepaschi Arena; Attendance: 14,604; Referee: Paolo Bertini

28 October 2004 8	Juventus	2–0	Roma	Turin
20:30 CEST (UTC+02:00)	Del Piero 31'; Zalayeta 74'	Report		Stadium: Stadio delle Alpi; Attendance: 27,764; Referee: Pierluigi Collina

31 October 2004 9	Juventus	3–0	Chievo	Turin
15:00 CET (UTC+01:00)	Zalayeta 25'; Nedvěd 65'; Ibrahimović 79'	Report		Stadium: Stadio delle Alpi; Attendance: 22,451; Referee: Tiziano Pieri

6 November 2004 10	Reggina	2–1	Juventus	Reggio Calabria
20:30 CET (UTC+01:00)	Colucci 13'; Zamboni 26'	Report	Ibrahimović 14'	Stadium: Stadio Oreste Granillo; Attendance: 20,192; Referee: Gianluca Paparesta

10 November 2004 11	Juventus	1–0	Fiorentina	Turin
20:30 CET (UTC+01:00)	Olivera 72'	Report		Stadium: Stadio delle Alpi; Attendance: 22,983; Referee: Stefano Farina

14 November 2004 12	Lecce	0–1	Juventus	Lecce
15:00 CET (UTC+01:00)		Report	Del Piero 14'	Stadium: Stadio Via del Mare; Attendance: 30,482; Referee: Massimo De Santis

28 November 2004 13	Internazionale	2–2	Juventus	Milan
20:30 CET (UTC+01:00)	Vieri 79'; Adriano 85'	Report	Zalayeta 53'; Ibrahimović 66' (pen.)	Stadium: San Siro; Attendance: 78,471; Referee: Pasquale Rodomonti

5 December 2004 14	Juventus	2–1	Lazio	Turin
15:00 CET (UTC+01:00)	Olivera 40'; Ibrahimović 75'	Report	Pandev 11'	Stadium: Stadio delle Alpi; Attendance: 20,787; Referee: Paolo Dondarini

12 December 2004 15	Bologna	0–1	Juventus	Bologna
20:30 CET (UTC+01:00)		Report	Nedvěd 86'	Stadium: Stadio Renato Dall'Ara; Attendance: 28,458; Referee: Tiziano Pieri

18 December 2004 16	Juventus	0–0	AC Milan	Turin
20:30 CET (UTC+01:00)		Report		Stadium: Stadio delle Alpi; Attendance: 54,181; Referee: Paolo Bertini

6 January 2005 17	Parma	1–1	Juventus	Parma
15:00 CET (UTC+01:00)	Marchionni 85'	Report	Ibrahimović 64'	Stadium: Stadio Ennio Tardini; Attendance: 23,010; Referee: Massimo De Santis

9 January 2005 18	Juventus	4–2	Livorno	Turin
15:00 CET (UTC+01:00)	Del Piero 17'; Camoranesi 25', 90' (pen.); Ibrahimović 75'	Report	Vidigal 42'; Melara 80'	Stadium: Stadio delle Alpi; Attendance: 21,445; Referee: Stefano Farina

16 January 2005 19	Cagliari	1–1	Juventus	Cagliari
20:30 CET (UTC+01:00)	Zola 89'	Report	Emerson 55'	Stadium: Stadio Sant'Elia; Attendance: 22,000; Referee: Salvatore Racalbuto

23 January 2005 20	Juventus	2–0	Brescia	Turin
15:00 CET (UTC+01:00)	Trezeguet 12'; Domizzi 43' (o.g.)	Report		Stadium: Stadio delle Alpi; Attendance: 19,338; Referee: Pasquale Rodomonti

30 January 2005 21	Atalanta	1–2	Juventus	Bergamo
15:00 CET (UTC+01:00)	Thuram 90+1' (o.g.)	Report	Olivera 23'; Del Piero 80' (pen.)	Stadium: Stadio Atleti Azzurri d'Italia; Attendance: 18,054; Referee: Pierluigi Collina

2 February 2005 22	Juventus	0–1	Sampdoria	Turin
20:30 CET (UTC+01:00)		Report	Diana 34'	Stadium: Stadio delle Alpi; Attendance: 20,016; Referee: Domenico Messina

5 February 2005 23	Palermo	1–0	Juventus	Palermo
20:30 CET (UTC+01:00)	Brienza 12'	Report		Stadium: Stadio Renzo Barbera; Attendance: 34,047; Referee: Massimo De Santis

13 February 2005 24	Juventus	2–1	Udinese	Turin
15:00 CET (UTC+01:00)	Ibrahimović 1'; Camoranesi 49'	Report	Di Michele 90+2'	Stadium: Stadio delle Alpi; Attendance: 20,632; Referee: Pasquale Rodomonti

19 February 2005 25	Messina	0–0	Juventus	Messina
18:00 CET (UTC+01:00)		Report		Stadium: Stadio San Filippo; Attendance: 37,500; Referee: Stefano Farina

27 February 2005 26	Juventus	3–0	Siena	Turin
15:00 CET (UTC+01:00)	Del Piero 35', 63' (pen.); Emerson 50'	Report		Stadium: Stadio delle Alpi; Attendance: 19,385; Referee: Pierluigi Collina

5 March 2005 27	Roma	1–2	Juventus	Rome
20:40 CET (UTC+01:00)	Cassano 39'	Report	Cannavaro 11'; Del Piero 44' (pen.)	Stadium: Stadio Olimpico; Attendance: 69,488; Referee: Salvatore Racalbuto

13 March 2005 28	Chievo	0–1	Juventus	Verona
20:30 CET (UTC+01:00)		Report	Olivera 87'	Stadium: Stadio Marc'Antonio Bentegodi; Attendance: 24,514; Referee: Gianluca Paparesta

19 March 2005 29	Juventus	1–0	Reggina	Turin
20:30 CET (UTC+01:00)	Del Piero 65'	Report		Stadium: Stadio delle Alpi; Attendance: 21,185; Referee: Domenico Messina

9 April 2005 30	Fiorentina	3–3	Juventus	Florence
20:30 CEST (UTC+02:00)	Pazzini 14'; Chiellini 36'; Dainelli 75'	Report	Del Piero 22'; Ibrahimović 59', 82'	Stadium: Stadio Artemio Franchi; Attendance: 45,614; Referee: Pierluigi Collina

17 April 2005 31	Juventus	5–2	Lecce	Turin
15:00 CEST (UTC+02:00)	Appiah 16'; Ibrahimović 34', 43', 82'; Nedvěd 56'	Report	Vučinić 7'; Dalla Bona 89' (pen.)	Stadium: Stadio delle Alpi; Attendance: 21,048; Referee: Matteo Trefoloni

20 April 2005 32	Juventus	0–1	Internazionale	Turin
20:30 CEST (UTC+02:00)		Report	Cruz 24'	Stadium: Stadio delle Alpi; Attendance: 23,157; Referee: Massimo De Santis

24 April 2005 33	Lazio	0–1	Juventus	Rome
20:30 CEST (UTC+02:00)		Report	Nedvěd 85'	Stadium: Stadio Olimpico; Attendance: 45,462; Referee: Matteo Trefoloni

1 May 2005 34	Juventus	2–1	Bologna	Turin
15:00 CEST (UTC+02:00)	Cannavaro 20'; Zalayeta 25'	Report	Giunti 29'	Stadium: Stadio delle Alpi; Attendance: 21,359; Referee: Domenico Messina

8 May 2005 35	AC Milan	0–1	Juventus	Milan
15:00 CEST (UTC+02:00)		Report	Trezeguet 28'	Stadium: San Siro; Attendance: 79,232; Referee: Pierluigi Collina

15 May 2005 36	Juventus	2–0	Parma	Turin
15:00 CEST (UTC+02:00)	Del Piero 6'; Ibrahimović 23'	Report		Stadium: Stadio delle Alpi; Attendance: 35,074; Referee: Gianluca Paparesta

22 May 2005 37	Livorno	2–2	Juventus	Livorno
15:00 CEST (UTC+02:00)	Protti 47'; Lucarelli 55'	Report	Nedvěd 10'; Trezeguet 66'	Stadium: Stadio Armando Picchi; Attendance: 19,726; Referee: Domenico Messina

29 May 2005 38	Juventus	4–2	Cagliari	Turin
15:00 CEST (UTC+02:00)	Del Piero 43'; Trezeguet 51', 74'; Appiah 59'	Report	Zola 61', 87'	Stadium: Stadio delle Alpi; Attendance: 52,712; Referee: Luca Banti

=== Coppa Italia ===
==== Round of 16 ====
19 November 2004 First leg	Atalanta	2–0	Juventus	Bergamo
21:00 CET (UTC+01:00)	Lazzari 58', 75'			Stadium: Stadio Atleti Azzurri d'Italia; Referee: Mauro Bergonzi

13 January 2005 Second leg	Juventus	3–3 (3–5 agg.)	Atalanta	Turin
21:00 CET (UTC+01:00)	Natali 4' (o.g.); Zalayeta 33'; Trezeguet 79'		Lazzari 10', 43', 90+1'	Stadium: Stadio delle Alpi; Referee: Nicola Ayroldi

=== UEFA Champions League ===
==== Third qualifying round ====
10 August 2004 First leg	Juventus (Italy)	2–2	(Sweden) Djurgårdens	Turin, Italy
20:45 CEST (UTC+02:00)	Trezeguet 50'; Emerson 59'	Report	Johansson 45+1' (pen.); Hysén 49'	Stadium: Stadio delle Alpi; Referee: Herbert Fandel (Germany)

25 August 2004 Second leg	Djurgårdens (Sweden)	1–4 (3–6 agg.)	(Italy) Juventus	Solna, Sweden
20:45 CEST (UTC+02:00)	Arneng 19'	Report	Del Piero 10'; Trezeguet 35', 87'; Nedvěd 54'	Stadium: Råsunda Stadium; Referee: Graham Poll (England)

==== Group stage ====
Group C
Team	Pld	W	D	L	GF	GA	GD	Pts
(Italy) Juventus	6	5	1	0	6	1	+5	16
(Germany) Bayern Munich	6	3	1	2	12	5	+7	10
(Netherlands) Ajax	6	1	1	4	6	10	−4	4
(Israel) Maccabi Tel Aviv	6	1	1	4	4	12	−8	4

15 September 2004 1	Ajax (Netherlands)	0–1	(Italy) Juventus	Amsterdam, Netherlands
20:45 CEST (UTC+02:00)		Report	Nedvěd 42'	Stadium: Amsterdam Arena; Referee: Urs Meier (Switzerland)

28 September 2004 2	Juventus (Italy)	1–0	(Israel) Maccabi Tel Aviv	Turin, Italy
20:45 CEST (UTC+02:00)	Camoranesi 37'	Report		Stadium: Stadio delle Alpi; Attendance: 6,494; Referee: Alain Hamer (Luxembourg)

19 October 2004 3	Juventus (Italy)	1–0	(Germany) Bayern Munich	Turin, Italy
20:45 CEST (UTC+02:00)	Nedvěd 75'	Report		Stadium: Stadio delle Alpi; Attendance: 18,089; Referee: Manuel Mejuto González (Spain)

3 November 2004 4	Bayern Munich (Germany)	0–1	(Italy) Juventus	Munich, Germany
20:45 CET (UTC+01:00)		Report	Del Piero 90'	Stadium: Olympiastadion; Attendance: 59,000; Referee: Graham Poll (England)

23 November 2004 5	Juventus (Italy)	1–0	(Netherlands) Ajax	Turin, Italy
20:45 CET (UTC+01:00)	Zalayeta 15'	Report		Stadium: Stadio delle Alpi; Attendance: 6,875; Referee: Konrad Plautz (Austria)

8 December 2004 6	Maccabi Tel Aviv (Israel)	1–1	(Italy) Juventus	Ramat Gan, Israel
20:45 CET (UTC+01:00)	Dego 29' (pen.)	Report	Del Piero 71'	Stadium: Ramat Gan Stadium; Referee: Alain Sars (France)

==== Knockout phase ====
===== Round of 16 =====
22 February 2005 First leg	Real Madrid (Spain)	1–0	(Italy) Juventus	Madrid, Spain
20:45 CET (UTC+01:00)	Helguera 31'	Report		Stadium: Santiago Bernabéu; Attendance: 75,000; Referee: Ľuboš Micheľ (Slovakia)

9 March 2005 Second leg	Juventus (Italy)	2–0 (a.e.t.) (2–1 agg.)	(Spain) Real Madrid	Turin, Italy
20:45 CET (UTC+01:00)	Trezeguet 75'; Zalayeta 116'	Report		Stadium: Stadio delle Alpi; Attendance: 68,850; Referee: Markus Merk (Germany)

===== Quarter-finals =====
5 April 2005 First leg	Liverpool (England)	2–1	(Italy) Juventus	Liverpool, England
20:45 CEST (UTC+02:00)	Hyypiä 10'; García 25'	Report	Cannavaro 63'	Stadium: Anfield; Attendance: 41,200; Referee: Frank De Bleeckere (Belgium)

13 April 2005 Second leg	Juventus (Italy)	0–0 (1–2 agg.)	(England) Liverpool	Turin, Italy
20:45 CEST (UTC+02:00)		Report		Stadium: Stadio delle Alpi; Attendance: 65,000; Referee: Valentin Ivanov (Russia)

== Statistics ==
=== Players statistics ===
No.	Pos	Nat	Player	Total		Serie A		Champions League		Coppa Italia	
No.	Pos	Nat	Player	Apps	Goals	Apps	Goals	Apps	Goals	Apps	Goals
1	GK	(Italy) ITA	Buffon	48	-29	37	-23	11	-6		
27	DF	(France) FRA	Zebina	31	0	24	0	6	0	1	0
21	DF	(France) FRA	Thuram	49	0	37	0	11	0	1	0
28	DF	(Italy) ITA	Cannavaro	47	3	38	2	8+1	1		
19	DF	(Italy) ITA	Zambrotta	48	0	36	0	11+1	0		
16	MF	(Italy) ITA	Camoranesi	46	5	34+2	4	9	1	1	0
8	MF	(Brazil) BRA	Emerson	44	3	33	2	11	1		
20	MF	(Italy) ITA	Blasi	36	0	18+9	0	8	0	1	0
11	MF	(Czech Republic) CZE	Nedved	38	10	27	7	10	3	1	0
9	FW	(Sweden) SWE	Ibrahimovic	45	16	31+4	16	9+1	0		
10	FW	(Italy) ITA	Del Piero	41	17	27+3	14	10	3	1	0
12	GK	(Italy) ITA	Chimenti	5	-10	1+1	-4	1	-1	2	-5
17	FW	(France) FRA	Trezeguet	24	14	14+4	9	3+2	4	1	1
18	MF	(Ghana) GHA	Appiah	23	2	14+4	2	0+3	0	2	0
7	DF	(Italy) ITA	Pessotto	26	0	13+6	0	3+3	0	1	0
25	FW	(Uruguay) URU	Zalayeta	38	9	10+18	6	3+5	2	2	1
3	MF	(Italy) ITA	Tacchinardi	24	0	8+8	0	4+2	0	2	0
24	MF	(Uruguay) URU	Olivera	28	4	6+12	4	2+6	0	2	0
15	DF	(Italy) ITA	Birindelli	18	0	5+7	0	3+1	0	2	0
4	DF	(Uruguay) URU	Montero	12	0	3+2	0	5+1	0	1	0
23	FW	(France) FRA	Kapo	19	0	2+12	0	1+2	0	2	0
2	DF	(Italy) ITA	Ferrara	5	0	0+4	0	0	0	1	0
5	DF	(Croatia) CRO	Tudor	4	0	0+2	0	1	0	1	0
6	DF	(Italy) ITA	Legrottaglie	2	0	0	0	1	0	1	0
13	DF	(Italy) ITA	Iuliano	1	0	0	0	0	0	1	0
22	GK	(France) FRA	Bonnefoi	0	0	0	0	0	0		
30	FW	(Romania) ROU	Mutu	1	0	0+1	0				
34	DF	(Italy) ITA	Masiello	1	0	0+1	0				
36	MF	(Italy) ITA	De Ceglie	0	0	0	0				
9	FW	(Italy) ITA	Miccoli	1	0	0	0	1	0		
37	FW	(Italy) ITA	Rej Volpato	1	0	0	0	0	0	1	0

- Source: http://calcio-seriea.net/presenze/2004/1253/

=== Goalscorers ===
- (Sweden) Zlatan Ibrahimović 16
- (Italy) Alessandro Del Piero 14
- (France) David Trezeguet 9
- (Czech Republic) Pavel Nedvěd 7
- (Uruguay) Marcelo Zalayeta 6
