= 2004–05 Olympique Lyonnais season =

Lyon
2004–05 season
- Owner: OL Groupe
- President: Jean-Michel Aulas
- Head coach: Paul Le Guen
- Stadium: Stade de Gerland
- Ligue 1: 1st (champions)
- Coupe de France: Round of 16
- Coupe de la Ligue: Round of 32
- Trophée des Champions: Winners
- Champions League: Quarter-finals
- Top goalscorer: League: Juninho (13); All: Juninho (16)
- Highest home attendance: 40,352 vs. Nice (28 May 2005)
- Lowest home attendance: 32,000 vs. Istres (12 March 2005)
- Average home league attendance: 37,211
Home colours	Away colours	Third colours

The 2004–05 season was the 106th season in the existence of Olympique Lyonnais and the club's 16th consecutive season in the top flight of French football. They participated in the Ligue 1, the Coupe de France, the Coupe de la Ligue, the Trophée des Champions and UEFA Champions League.

== First-team squad ==
Squad at end of season

Note: Flags indicate national team as defined under FIFA eligibility rules; some limited exceptions apply. Players may hold more than one non-FIFA nationality.

No.	Pos.	Nation	Player
1	GK	FRA	Grégory Coupet
3	DF	BRA	Cris
4	MF	GHA	Michael Essien
5	DF	BRA	Caçapa (captain)
7	MF	MLI	Mahamadou Diarra
8	MF	BRA	Juninho Pernambucano
10	MF	FRA	Florent Malouda
11	FW	BRA	Nilmar
12	DF	FRA	Anthony Réveillère
13	FW	FRA	Pierre-Alain Frau
14	MF	FRA	Sidney Govou
15	DF	FRA	Lamine Diatta
20	DF	FRA	Eric Abidal
21	MF	FRA	Bryan Bergougnoux

No.	Pos.	Nation	Player
22	FW	FRA	Sylvain Wiltord
23	DF	FRA	Jérémy Berthod
25	GK	FRA	Joan Hartock
26	MF	FRA	Jérémy Clément
27	DF	FRA	Johann Truchet
28	FW	FRA	Karim Benzema
29	MF	FRA	Yohan Gomez
30	GK	FRA	Nicolas Puydebois
31	MF	ALG	Yacine Hima
32	MF	CHA	Sylvain Idangar
34	MF	FRA	Hatem Ben Arfa
35	GK	FRA	Daniel Jaccard
—	FW	FRA	Kévin Jacmot

=== Left club during season ===
Note: Flags indicate national team as defined under FIFA eligibility rules; some limited exceptions apply. Players may hold more than one non-FIFA nationality.

No.	Pos.	Nation	Player
6	MF	FRA	Florent Balmont (to Nice)
9	FW	BRA	Giovane Élber (to Borussia Mönchengladbach)
19	FW	FRA	Julien Viale (on loan to Reims)
22	DF	FRA	Romain Sartre (on loan to Laval)

== Competitions ==
=== Overall record ===
Competition	First match	Last match	Starting round	Final position	Record							
Competition	First match	Last match	Starting round	Final position	Pld	W	D	L	GF	GA	GD	Win %
Ligue 1	6 August 2004	28 May 2005	Matchday 1	Winners	38	22	13	3	56	22	+34	57.89
Coupe de France	8 January 2005	1 March 2005	Round of 64	Round of 16	3	2	1	0	5	2	+3	66.67
Coupe de la Ligue	10 November 2004		Round of 32	Round of 32	1	0	0	1	2	3	−1	0.00
Trophée des Champions	31 July 2004		Final	Winners	1	0	1	0	1	1	+0	0.00
UEFA Champions League	15 September 2004	13 April 2005	Group stage	Quarter-finals	10	6	3	1	29	12	+17	60.00
Total					53	30	18	5	93	40	+53	56.60

Source: Competitions

=== Trophée des Champions ===
31 July 2004 Final	Paris Saint-Germain	1–1 (6–7 p)	Lyon	Cannes
20:45 CEST (UTC+2)	Fiorèse 71'		Élber 55'	Stadium: Stade Pierre de Coubertin; Attendance: 9,429; Referee: Gilles Veissière
	Penalties
	Pauleta (penalty scored); Rothen (penalty scored); Yepes (penalty scored); Armand (penalty missed); Mendy (penalty scored); Cissé (penalty scored); Benachour (penalty scored); Touré (penalty missed)		(penalty scored) Bergougnoux; (penalty scored) Viale; (penalty missed) Malouda; (penalty scored) Balmont; (penalty scored) Juninho; (penalty scored) Essien; (penalty scored) Abidal; (penalty scored) Berthod

=== Ligue 1 ===
==== League table ====
Pos	Team	Pld	W	D	L	GF	GA	GD	Pts	Qualification or relegation
1	Lyon (C)	38	22	13	3	56	22	+34	79	Qualification to Champions League group stage
2	Lille	38	18	13	7	52	29	+23	67	Qualification to Champions League group stage
3	Monaco	38	15	18	5	52	35	+17	63	Qualification to Champions League third qualifying round
4	Rennes	38	15	10	13	49	42	+7	55	Qualification to UEFA Cup first round
5	Marseille	38	15	10	13	47	42	+5	55	Qualification to Intertoto Cup third round

Source: Ligue 1
Rules for classification: 1) points; 2) goal difference; 3) number of goals scored.
(C) Champions

==== Results summary ====
Overall								Home						Away					
Pld	W	D	L	GF	GA	GD	Pts	W	D	L	GF	GA	GD	W	D	L	GF	GA	GD
38	22	13	3	56	22	+34	79	13	5	1	33	10	+23	9	8	2	23	12	+11

Source: Ligue 1

==== Results by round ====
Round	1	2	3	4	5	6	7	8	9	10	11	12	13	14	15	16	17	18	19	20	21	22	23	24	25	26	27	28	29	30	31	32	33	34	35	36	37	38
Ground	A	H	A	H	A	H	A	H	A	H	A	H	A	H	A	H	A	A	H	A	H	A	H	A	H	A	H	A	H	A	H	A	H	A	H	H	A	H
Result	W	D	D	W	W	D	W	D	W	W	D	W	W	W	D	W	D	D	D	W	W	L	W	D	W	D	W	L	W	W	W	D	L	W	W	W	W	D
Position	4	7	10	6	3	3	2	3	2	1	1	1	1	1	1	1	1	1	1	1	1	1	1	1	1	1	1	1	1	1	1	1	1	1	1	1	1	1

Source: Ligue 1
A = Away; H = Home; W = Win; D = Draw; L = Loss

==== Matches ====
6 August 2004 1	Nice	0–1	Lyon	Nice
20:45 CEST (UTC+2)		Report	Élber 76'	Stadium: Stade du Ray; Attendance: 14,096; Referee: Bertrand Layec

14 August 2004 2	Lyon	1–1	Sochaux	Lyon
20:00 CEST (UTC+2)	Juninho 70' (pen.)	Report	Potillon 38'	Stadium: Stade de Gerland; Attendance: 38,041; Referee: Stéphane Bre

22 August 2004 3	Metz	1–1	Lyon	Metz
18:00 CEST (UTC+2)	Abidal	Report	Balmont 66'	Stadium: Stade Saint-Symphorien; Attendance: 23,317; Referee: Hervé Piccirillo

28 August 2004 4	Lyon	1–0	Lille	Lyon
20:00 CEST (UTC+2)	Frau 8'	Report		Stadium: Stade de Gerland; Attendance: 34,107; Referee: Philippe Kalt

11 September 2004 5	Rennes	1–2	Lyon	Rennes
20:30 CEST (UTC+2)	Dudu 88'	Report	Nilmar 80', 87'	Stadium: Stade de la Route de Lorient; Attendance: 23,273; Referee: Claude Colombo

18 September 2004 6	Lyon	0–0	Bastia	Lyon
20:00 CEST (UTC+2)		Report		Stadium: Stade de Gerland; Attendance: 33,268; Referee: Damien Ledentu

21 September 2004 7	Toulouse	0–2	Lyon	Toulouse
21:00 CEST (UTC+2)		Report	Essien 51'; Malouda 87'	Stadium: Stadium de Toulouse; Attendance: 31,089; Referee: Gilles Veissiere

25 September 2004 8	Lyon	0–0	Monaco	Lyon
17:15 CEST (UTC+2)		Report	Pérez (yellow card) 44' (yellow-red card) 60'	Stadium: Stade de Gerland; Attendance: 38,825; Referee: Laurent Duhamel

3 October 2004 9	Saint-Étienne	2–3	Lyon	Saint-Étienne
21:00 CEST (UTC+2)	Marin 47'; Feindouno 59'	Report	Juninho 36', 85'; Govou 90'	Stadium: Stade Geoffroy-Guichard; Attendance: 34,793; Referee: Pascal Garibian

15 October 2004 10	Lyon	4–0	Caen	Lyon
20:00 CEST (UTC+2)	Diarra 11'; Malouda 15'; Essien (33e); Frau 70' (pen.)	Report		Stadium: Stade de Gerland; Attendance: 34,000; Referee: Olivier Thual

23 October 2004 11	Istres	0–0	Lyon	Nîmes
17:15 CEST (UTC+2)	Thiam (red card) 75'	Report		Stadium: Stade des Costières; Attendance: 10,197; Referee: Stéphane Bre

30 October 2004 12	Lyon	1–0	Strasbourg	Lyon
20:00 CET (UTC+1)	Frau 66'	Report	Keita (red card) 36'	Stadium: Stade de Gerland; Attendance: 38,220; Referee: Thierry Auriac

6 November 2004 13	Lens	0–1	Lyon	Lens
20:00 CET (UTC+1)		Report	Itandje 35' (o.g.)	Stadium: Stade Félix-Bollaert; Attendance: 39,070; Referee: Pascal Vileo

13 November 2004 14	Lyon	2–0	Nantes	Lyon
17:15 CET (UTC+1)	Frau 46'; Govou 58'	Report		Stadium: Stade de Gerland; Attendance: 35,556; Referee: Gilles Veissiere

19 November 2004 15	Paris Saint-Germain	0–0	Lyon	Paris
21:00 CET (UTC+1)	Yepes (yellow card) 12' (yellow-red card) 22'	Report		Stadium: Parc des Princes; Attendance: 42,458; Referee: Alain Sars

27 November 2004 16	Lyon	2–1	Auxerre	Lyon
17:15 CET (UTC+1)	Wiltord 5'; Juninho 29'	Report	Cheyrou 66'	Stadium: Stade de Gerland; Attendance: 37,933; Referee: Stéphane Bre

4 December 2004 17	Ajaccio	1–1	Lyon	Ajaccio
20:00 CET (UTC+1)	Lucas Pereira 89'	Report	Juninho 87'	Stadium: Stade François Coty; Attendance: 6,260; Referee: Bruno Derrien

11 December 2004 18	Bordeaux	0–0	Lyon	Bordeaux
20:00 CET (UTC+1)		Report		Stadium: Stade Chaban-Delmas; Attendance: 31,832; Referee: Gilles Veissiere

17 December 2004 19	Lyon	1–1	Marseille	Lyon
21:00 CET (UTC+1)	Govou 38'	Report	Luyindula 3'	Stadium: Stade de Gerland; Attendance: 38,728; Referee: Claude Colombo

12 January 2005 20	Sochaux	0–2	Lyon	Montbéliard
20:30 CET (UTC+1)		Report	Bergougnoux 6'; Diarra 42'	Stadium: Stade Auguste Bonal; Attendance: 17,249; Referee: Alain Hamer

15 January 2005 21	Lyon	2–0	Metz	Lyon
21:00 CET (UTC+1)	Juninho 84'; Bergougnoux 88'	Report		Stadium: Stade de Gerland; Attendance: 38,909; Referee: Stéphane Moulin

23 January 2005 22	Lille	2–1	Lyon	Lille
21:00 CET (UTC+1)	Moussilou 2', 68'	Report	Juninho 74' (pen.)	Stadium: Stadium Lille Métropole; Attendance: 17,000; Referee: Gilles Veissiere

26 January 2005 23	Lyon	2–1	Rennes	Lyon
18:00 CET (UTC+1)	Bergougnoux 43'; Govou 44'	Report	Didot (yellow card) 38' (yellow-red card) 79'; Monterrubio 90'	Stadium: Stade de Gerland; Attendance: 37,276; Referee: Stéphane Lannoy

1 February 2005 24	Bastia	1–1	Lyon	Furiani
17:00 CET (UTC+1)	Uras (red card) 47'; Chimbonda 48'	Report	Essien 19'	Stadium: Stade Armand Cesari; Attendance: 4,419; Referee: Laurent Duhamel

5 February 2005 25	Lyon	4–0	Toulouse	Lyon
20:00 CET (UTC+1)	Juninho 2', 52'; Malouda 45'; Bergougnoux 57'	Report		Stadium: Stade de Gerland; Attendance: 37,447; Referee: Hervé Piccirillo

18 February 2005 26	Monaco	1–1	Lyon	Monaco
21:00 CET (UTC+1)	J. Rodriguez 84'	Report	Essien (yellow card) 63' (yellow-red card) 64'; Clément 89'	Stadium: Stade Louis II; Attendance: 17,169; Referee: Pascal Garibian

26 February 2005 27	Lyon	3–2	Saint-Étienne	Lyon
17:15 CET (UTC+1)	Wiltord 45'; Malouda 46'; Frau 49'	Report	Feindouno 55'; Compan 89'	Stadium: Stade de Gerland; Attendance: 38,915; Referee: Alain Sars

4 March 2005 28	Caen	1–0	Lyon	Caen
20:00 CET (UTC+1)	Mazure 72'	Report		Stadium: Stade Michel d'Ornano; Attendance: 20,649; Referee: Bruno Derrien

12 March 2005 29	Lyon	2–1	Istres	Lyon
17:15 CET (UTC+1)	Juninho 19'; Govou 77'	Report	N'Diaye 31'	Stadium: Stade de Gerland; Attendance: 32,000; Referee: Fredy Fautrel

19 March 2005 30	Strasbourg	0–1	Lyon	Strasbourg
20:00 CET (UTC+1)		Report	Wiltord 58'	Stadium: Stade de la Meinau; Attendance: 22,442; Referee: Hervé Piccirillo

2 April 2005 31	Lyon	1–0	Lens	Lyon
20:00 CEST (UTC+2)	Juninho 64'	Report		Stadium: Stade de Gerland; Attendance: 37,669; Referee: Thierry Auriac

9 April 2005 32	Nantes	2–2	Lyon	Nantes
17:15 CEST (UTC+2)	Cetto 44'; Bagayoko 63'	Report	Frau 36', 82'	Stadium: Stade de la Beaujoire; Attendance: 35,000; Referee: Gilles Veissiere

17 April 2005 33	Lyon	0–1	Paris Saint-Germain	Lyon
21:00 CEST (UTC+2)		Report	Ljuboja 44'	Stadium: Stade de Gerland; Attendance: 37,864; Referee: Claude Colombo

24 April 2005 34	Auxerre	0–3	Lyon	Auxerre
21:00 CEST (UTC+2)		Report	Juninho 26'; Essien 45'; Cris 54'	Stadium: Stade Abbé-Deschamps; Attendance: 18,000; Referee: Stéphane Bre

8 May 2005 35	Lyon	2–1	Ajaccio	Lyon
21:00 CEST (UTC+2)	Govou 35'; Caçapa 65'	Report	Seck (red card) 42'; Demont 51'	Stadium: Stade de Gerland; Attendance: 38,946; Referee: Laurent Duhamel

15 May 2005 36	Lyon	5–1	Bordeaux	Lyon
21:00 CEST (UTC+2)	Malouda 24'; Cris 34', 45'; Govou 66', 83'	Report	Riera 9'; Rool (yellow card) 29' (red card) 29'	Stadium: Stade de Gerland; Attendance: 38,954; Referee: Pascal Garibian

21 May 2005 37	Marseille	0–1	Lyon	Marseille
20:45 CEST (UTC+2)		Report	Juninho 55'	Stadium: Stade Vélodrome; Attendance: 57,041; Referee: Claude Colombo

28 May 2005 38	Lyon	0–0	Nice	Lyon
20:00 CEST (UTC+2)		Report		Stadium: Stade de Gerland; Attendance: 40,352; Referee: Philippe Kalt

=== Coupe de France ===
8 January 2005 Round of 64	Viry-Châtillon	0–2	Lyon	Viry-Châtillon
			Juninho 27'; Nilmar 66'	Stadium: Stade Francoeur; Attendance: 10,000; Referee: Améziane Khendek

6 February 2005 Round of 32	Toulouse	1–2	Lyon	Toulouse
	Dalmat 73'		Wiltord 66'; Diarra 78' (pen.)	Stadium: Stadium de Toulouse; Attendance: 19,629; Referee: Damien Ledentu

1 March 2005 Round of 16	Clermont	1–1 (a.e.t.) (4–3 p)	Lyon	Clermont-Ferrand
	B. Rodriguez 55'		Wiltord 94'	Stadium: Stade Gabriel Montpied; Attendance: 8,724; Referee: Claude Colombo

=== Coupe de la Ligue ===
10 November 2004 Round of 32	Lille	3–2 (a.e.t.)	Lyon	Lille
19:00 CET (UTC+1)	Moussilou 56'; Dernis 113'; Dumont 119'		Abidal 90'; Ben Arfa 103' (pen.)	Stadium: Stadium Lille Métropole; Attendance: 15,015; Referee: Bertrand Layec

=== UEFA Champions League ===
==== Group stage ====
Pos	Team	Pld	W	D	L	GF	GA	GD	Pts	Qualification
1	(France) Lyon	6	4	1	1	17	8	+9	13	Advance to knockout stage
2	(England) Manchester United	6	3	2	1	14	9	+5	11	Advance to knockout stage
3	(Turkey) Fenerbahçe	6	3	0	3	10	13	−3	9	Transfer to UEFA Cup
4	(Czech Republic) Sparta Prague	6	0	1	5	2	13	−11	1	

15 September 2004 1	Lyon (France)	2–2	(England) Manchester United	Lyon, France
20:45 CEST (UTC+2)	Cris 35'; Frau 45'	Report	Van Nistelrooy 56', 61'	Stadium: Stade de Gerland; Attendance: 40,000; Referee: Wolfgang Stark (Germany)

28 September 2004 2	Sparta Prague (Czech Republic)	1–2	(France) Lyon	Prague, Czech Republic
20:45 CEST (UTC+2)	Jun 7'	Report	Essien 25'; Wiltord 58'	Stadium: Letná Stadium; Attendance: 12,050; Referee: Arturo Daudén Ibáñez (Spain)

19 October 2004 3	Fenerbahçe (Turkey)	1–3	(France) Lyon	Istanbul, Turkey
21:45 EEST (UTC+3)	Nobre 68'	Report	Juninho 55'; Cris 66'; Frau 87'	Stadium: Şükrü Saracoğlu Stadium; Attendance: 49,000; Referee: Yuri Baskakov (Russia)

3 November 2004 4	Lyon (France)	4–2	(Turkey) Fenerbahçe	Lyon, France
20:45 CET (UTC+1)	Essien 22'; Malouda 53'; Nilmar 90+4', 90+6'	Report	Selçuk 14'; Tuncay 73'	Stadium: Stade de Gerland; Attendance: 36,000; Referee: Stefano Farina (Italy)

23 November 2004 5	Manchester United (England)	2–1	(France) Lyon	Manchester, France
19:45 GMT (UTC+0)	Neville 19'; Van Nistelrooy 53'	Report	Diarra 40'	Stadium: Old Trafford; Attendance: 66,398; Referee: Kim Milton Nielsen (Denmark)

8 December 2004 6	Lyon (France)	5–0	(Czech Republic) Sparta Prague	Lyon, France
20:45 CET (UTC+1)	Essien 7'; Nilmar 19', 51'; Idangar 83'; Bergougnoux 90+1'	Report		Stadium: Stade de Gerland; Attendance: 38,571; Referee: Konrad Plautz (Austria)

==== Knockout stage ====
===== Round of 16 =====
23 February 2005 First leg	Werder Bremen (Germany)	0–3	(France) Lyon	Bremen, Germany
20:45 CET (UTC+1)		Report	Wiltord 9'; Diarra 77'; Juninho 80'	Stadium: Weserstadion; Attendance: 36,925; Referee: Frank De Bleeckere (Belgium)

8 March 2005 Second leg	Lyon (France)	7–2 (10–2 agg.)	(Germany) Werder Bremen	Lyon, France
20:45 CET (UTC+1)	Wiltord 8', 55', 63'; Essien 17', 30'; Malouda 60'; Berthod 80' (pen.)	Report	Micoud 32'; Ismaël 57' (pen.)	Stadium: Stade de Gerland; Attendance: 38,925; Referee: Valentin Ivanov (Russia)

===== Quarter-finals =====
5 April 2005 First leg	Lyon (France)	1–1	(Netherlands) PSV Eindhoven	Lyon, France
20:45 CEST (UTC+2)	Malouda 12'	Report	Cocu 79'	Stadium: Stade de Gerland; Attendance: 39,200; Referee: Pierluigi Collina (Italy)

13 April 2005 Second leg	PSV Eindhoven (Netherlands)	1–1 (a.e.t.) (2–2 agg.) (4–2 p)	(France) Lyon	Eindhoven, Netherlands
20:45 CET (UTC+1)	Alex 50'	Report	Wiltord 10'	Stadium: Philips Stadion; Attendance: 35,000; Referee: Kim Milton Nielsen (Denmark)
	Penalties
	Robert (penalty scored); Beasley (penalty missed); Bouma (penalty scored); Ooijer (penalty scored); Van Bommel (penalty scored)		(penalty missed) Abidal; (penalty scored) Ben Arfa; (penalty missed) Essien; (penalty scored) Juninho
