= 2004–05 UEFA Champions League group stage =

International football competition

The 2004–05 UEFA Champions League group stage matches took take place between 14 September and 8 December 2004. The group stage featured teams qualified by their league positions and others who had come through qualifying.

== Teams ==
The 32 teams were divided into four pots. Pot 1 comprised the previous year's title holders Porto and the top seven clubs in the team ranking. Pot 2 contained the following eight clubs in the rankings and likewise for Pots 3 and 4. Each group contained one team from each pot. A team's seeding was determined by the UEFA coefficients.

Clubs from the same association were paired up to split the matchdays between Tuesday and Wednesday. Clubs with the same pairing letter would play on different days, ensuring that teams from the same city (e.g. Milan and Internazionale, who also share a stadium) did not play on the same day.

Group winners and runners-up advanced to the first knockout round
Third-placed teams entered the UEFA Cup at the round of 32

Pot 1
Team	Notes	Coeff.
(Portugal) Porto		99.969
(Spain) Real Madrid		146.350
(Spain) Valencia		139.350
(Spain) Barcelona		134.350
(England) Manchester United		119.511
(Germany) Bayern Munich		105.331
(Spain) Deportivo La Coruña		104.350
(England) Arsenal		103.511

Pot 2
Team	Notes	Coeff.
(Italy) Milan		99.531
(England) Liverpool		90.511
(Italy) Juventus		84.531
(Italy) Internazionale		82.531
(Italy) Roma		78.531
(France) Lyon		70.947
(England) Chelsea		67.511
(Greece) Panathinaikos		65.467

Pot 3
Team	Notes	Coeff.
(Netherlands) PSV Eindhoven		65.247
(Germany) Bayer Leverkusen		62.331
(Scotland) Celtic		60.600
(Czech Republic) Sparta Prague		54.914
(France) Monaco		51.947
(Belgium) Anderlecht		49.528
(Netherlands) Ajax		48.247
(France) Paris Saint-Germain		45.947

Pot 4
Team	Notes	Coeff.
(Norway) Rosenborg		42.226
(Ukraine) Dynamo Kyiv		41.300
(Greece) Olympiacos		40.467
(Germany) Werder Bremen		37.331
(Ukraine) Shakhtar Donetsk		17.300
(Turkey) Fenerbahçe		16.656
(Israel) Maccabi Tel Aviv		14.012
(Russia) CSKA Moscow		8.572

Notes

1. ^{TH} Champions League title holders (automatic top seed of pot 1)
2. ^{Q3} Winners of the third qualifying round

== Format ==
During the group stage, each team plays the other three teams in their group twice (home and away or at an alternative venue). The top two teams with the most points or who meet the tie-breaking criteria progress to the first knockout round. The third placed side entered the UEFA Cup in 2005.

=== Tie-breaking criteria ===
Based on paragraph 4.05 in the UEFA regulations for the current season, if two or more teams are equal on points on completion of the group matches, the following criteria are applied to determine the rankings:

1. higher number of points obtained in the group matches played among the teams in question;
2. superior goal difference from the group matches played among the teams in question;
3. higher number of goals scored away from home in the group matches played among the teams in question;
4. superior goal difference from all group matches played;
5. higher number of goals scored in all group matches played;
6. higher number of coefficient points accumulated by the club in question, as well as its association, over the previous five seasons.

== Groups ==
Times are CET/CEST, (Note: CET (UTC+1) for matches from 2 November 2004, and CEST (UTC+2) for matches to 20 October 2004.) as listed by UEFA (local times, if different, are in parentheses).

=== Group A ===
Pos	Team	Pld	W	D	L	GF	GA	GD	Pts	Qualification	MON	LIV	OLY	DEP
1	(France) Monaco	6	4	0	2	10	4	+6	12	Advance to knockout stage	—	1–0	2–1	2–0
2	(England) Liverpool	6	3	1	2	6	3	+3	10	Advance to knockout stage	2–0	—	3–1	0–0
3	(Greece) Olympiacos	6	3	1	2	5	5	0	10	Transfer to UEFA Cup	1–0	1–0	—	1–0
4	(Spain) Deportivo La Coruña	6	0	2	4	0	9	−9	2		0–5	0–1	0–0	—

15 September 2004
20:45 (19:45 UTC+1)

Liverpool (England)	2–0	(France) Monaco
Cissé 22'; Baroš 84'	Report

Anfield, Liverpool
Attendance: 33,517
Referee: Terje Hauge (Norway)
15 September 2004
20:45

Deportivo La Coruña (Spain)	0–0	(Greece) Olympiacos
	Report

Estadio Riazor, A Coruña
Attendance: 26,170
Referee: Frank de Bleeckere (Belgium)

28 September 2004
20:45 (21:45 UTC+3)

Olympiacos (Greece)	1–0	(England) Liverpool
Stoltidis 17'	Report

Karaiskakis Stadium, Piraeus
Attendance: 33,000
Referee: Pierluigi Collina (Italy)
28 September 2004
20:45

Monaco (France)	2–0	(Spain) Deportivo La Coruña
Kallon 5'; Saviola 10'	Report

Stade Louis II, Monaco
Attendance: 13,673
Referee: Stefano Farina (Italy)

19 October 2004
20:45

Monaco (France)	2–1	(Greece) Olympiacos
Saviola 3'; Chevantón 10'	Report	Okkas 60'

Stade Louis II, Monaco
Attendance: 16,624
Referee: Jan Wegereef (Netherlands)
19 October 2004
20:45 (19:45 UTC+1)

Liverpool (England)	0–0	(Spain) Deportivo La Coruña
	Report

Anfield, Liverpool
Attendance: 40,236
Referee: Anders Frisk (Sweden)

3 November 2004
20:45 (21:45 UTC+2)

Olympiacos (Greece)	1–0	(France) Monaco
Schürrer 84'	Report

Karaiskakis Stadium, Piraeus
Attendance: 33,353
Referee: Markus Merk (Germany)
3 November 2004
20:45

Deportivo La Coruña (Spain)	0–1	(England) Liverpool
	Report	Andrade 14' (o.g.)

Estadio Riazor, A Coruña
Attendance: 30,050
Referee: Wolfgang Stark (Germany)

23 November 2004
20:45 (21:45 UTC+2)

Olympiacos (Greece)	1–0	(Spain) Deportivo La Coruña
Đorđević 68'	Report

Karaiskakis Stadium, Piraeus
Attendance: 31,349
Referee: Terje Hauge (Norway)
23 November 2004
20:45

Monaco (France)	1–0	(England) Liverpool
Saviola 54'	Report

Stade Louis II, Monaco
Attendance: 16,502
Referee: Claus Bo Larsen (Denmark)

8 December 2004
20:45 (19:45 UTC+0)

Liverpool (England)	3–1	(Greece) Olympiacos
Sinama Pongolle 47'; Mellor 81'; Gerrard 86'	Report	Rivaldo 26'

Anfield, Liverpool
Attendance: 42,045
Referee: Manuel Mejuto González (Spain)
8 December 2004
20:45

Deportivo La Coruña (Spain)	0–5	(France) Monaco
	Report	Chevantón 21'; Givet 35'; Saviola 38'; Maicon 54'; Adebayor 75'

Estadio Riazor, A Coruña
Attendance: 11,931
Referee: Yuri Baskakov (Russia)

=== Group B ===
Pos	Team	Pld	W	D	L	GF	GA	GD	Pts	Qualification	LEV	RMA	DKV	ROM
1	(Germany) Bayer Leverkusen	6	3	2	1	13	7	+6	11	Advance to knockout stage	—	3–0	3–0	3–1
2	(Spain) Real Madrid	6	3	2	1	11	8	+3	11	Advance to knockout stage	1–1	—	1–0	4–2
3	(Ukraine) Dynamo Kyiv	6	3	1	2	11	8	+3	10	Transfer to UEFA Cup	4–2	2–2	—	2–0
4	(Italy) Roma	6	0	1	5	4	16	−12	1		1–1	0–3	0–3 (Note: With Dynamo Kyiv leading 1–0, the match was abandoned at half-time after referee Anders Frisk was hit by an object thrown from the crowd. UEFA awarded Dynamo Kyiv a 3–0 win and ordered Roma to play their next two European games behind closed doors.)	—

Notes:
15 September 2004
20:45

Roma (Italy)	0–3 Awarded (Note: With Dynamo Kyiv leading 1–0, the match was abandoned at half-time after referee Anders Frisk was hit by an object thrown from the crowd. UEFA awarded Dynamo Kyiv a 3–0 win and ordered Roma to play their next two European games behind closed doors.)	(Ukraine) Dynamo Kyiv
	Report	Gavrančić 29'

Stadio Olimpico, Rome
Attendance: 38,006
Referee: Anders Frisk (Sweden)
15 September 2004
20:45

Bayer Leverkusen (Germany)	3–0	(Spain) Real Madrid
Krzynówek 40'; França 50'; Berbatov 55'	Report

BayArena, Leverkusen
Attendance: 22,500
Referee: Graham Poll (England)

28 September 2004
20:45

Real Madrid (Spain)	4–2	(Italy) Roma
Raúl 39', 72'; Figo 53' (pen.); Roberto Carlos 79'	Report	De Rossi 3'; Cassano 21'

Santiago Bernabéu, Madrid
Attendance: 65,327
Referee: Valentin Ivanov (Russia)
28 September 2004
20:45 (21:45 UTC+3)

Dynamo Kyiv (Ukraine)	4–2	(Germany) Bayer Leverkusen
Rincón 30', 69'; Cernat 74', 90'	Report	Voronin 58'; Nowotny 68'

Olimpiyskiy National Sports Complex, Kyiv
Attendance: 82,000
Referee: Kim Milton Nielsen (Denmark)

19 October 2004
20:45

Real Madrid (Spain)	1–0	(Ukraine) Dynamo Kyiv
Owen 35'	Report

Santiago Bernabéu, Madrid
Attendance: 62,315
Referee: Gilles Veissière (France)
19 October 2004
20:45

Bayer Leverkusen (Germany)	3–1	(Italy) Roma
Roque Júnior 48'; Krzynówek 59'; França 90'	Report	Berbatov 26' (o.g.)

BayArena, Leverkusen
Attendance: 22,500
Referee: Eric Poulat (France)

3 November 2004
20:45 (21:45 UTC+2)

Dynamo Kyiv (Ukraine)	2–2	(Spain) Real Madrid
Yussuf 13'; Verpakovskis 23'	Report	Raúl 38'; Figo 44' (pen.)

Olimpiyskiy National Sports Complex, Kyiv
Attendance: 83,200
Referee: Kyros Vassaras (Greece)
3 November 2004
20:45

Roma (Italy)	1–1	(Germany) Bayer Leverkusen
Montella 90+3'	Report	Berbatov 82'

Stadio Olimpico, Rome
Attendance: 600
Referee: Lucílio Batista (Portugal)

23 November 2004
20:45

Real Madrid (Spain)	1–1	(Germany) Bayer Leverkusen
Raúl 70'	Report	Berbatov 36'

Santiago Bernabéu, Madrid
Attendance: 69,304
Referee: Alain Hamer (Luxembourg)
23 November 2004
20:45 (21:45 UTC+2)

Dynamo Kyiv (Ukraine)	2–0	(Italy) Roma
Dellas 73' (o.g.); Shatskikh 82'	Report

Olimpiyskiy National Sports Complex, Kyiv
Attendance: 57,000
Referee: Mike Riley (England)

8 December 2004
20:45

Bayer Leverkusen (Germany)	3–0	(Ukraine) Dynamo Kyiv
Juan 51'; Voronin 77'; Babić 86'	Report

BayArena, Leverkusen
Attendance: 22,500
Referee: Pierluigi Collina (Italy)
8 December 2004
20:45

Roma (Italy)	0–3	(Spain) Real Madrid
	Report	Ronaldo 9'; Figo 60' (pen.), 82'

Stadio Olimpico, Rome
Attendance: 400
Referee: René Temmink (Netherlands)

=== Group C ===
Pos	Team	Pld	W	D	L	GF	GA	GD	Pts	Qualification	JUV	BAY	AJX	MTA
1	(Italy) Juventus	6	5	1	0	6	1	+5	16	Advance to knockout stage	—	1–0	1–0	1–0
2	(Germany) Bayern Munich	6	3	1	2	12	5	+7	10	Advance to knockout stage	0–1	—	4–0	5–1
3	(Netherlands) Ajax	6	1	1	4	6	10	−4	4	Transfer to UEFA Cup	0–1	2–2	—	3–0
4	(Israel) Maccabi Tel Aviv	6	1	1	4	4	12	−8	4		1–1	0–1	2–1	—

15 September 2004
20:45 (21:45 UTC+3)

Maccabi Tel Aviv (Israel)	0–1	(Germany) Bayern Munich
	Report	Makaay 64' (pen.)

Ramat Gan Stadium, Ramat Gan (Note: Maccabi Tel Aviv played their home matches at Ramat Gan Stadium in Tel Aviv District, instead of their regular stadium, Bloomfield Stadium, Tel Aviv.)
Attendance: 21,140
Referee: Steve Bennett (England)
15 September 2004
20:45

Ajax (Netherlands)	0–1	(Italy) Juventus
	Report	Nedvěd 42'

Amsterdam Arena, Amsterdam
Attendance: 49,375
Referee: Urs Meier (Switzerland)

28 September 2004
20:45

Bayern Munich (Germany)	4–0	(Netherlands) Ajax
Makaay 28', 44', 51' (pen.); Zé Roberto 55'	Report

Olympiastadion, Munich
Attendance: 50,000
Referee: Alain Sars (France)
28 September 2004
20:45

Juventus (Italy)	1–0	(Israel) Maccabi Tel Aviv
Camoranesi 37'	Report

Stadio delle Alpi, Turin
Attendance: 6,494
Referee: Alain Hamer (Luxembourg)

19 October 2004
20:45

Juventus (Italy)	1–0	(Germany) Bayern Munich
Nedvěd 75'	Report

Stadio delle Alpi, Turin
Attendance: 18,089
Referee: Manuel Mejuto González (Spain)
19 October 2004
20:45

Ajax (Netherlands)	3–0	(Israel) Maccabi Tel Aviv
Sonck 4'; De Jong 21'; Van der Vaart 33'	Report

Amsterdam Arena, Amsterdam
Attendance: 48,161
Referee: Eduardo Iturralde González (Spain)

3 November 2004
20:45 (21:45 UTC+2)

Maccabi Tel Aviv (Israel)	2–1	(Netherlands) Ajax
Dego 49', 57'	Report	De Ridder 88'

Ramat Gan Stadium, Ramat Gan
Attendance: 18,054
Referee: Vladimir Hrinak (Slovakia)
3 November 2004
20:45

Bayern Munich (Germany)	0–1	(Italy) Juventus
	Report	Del Piero 90'

Olympiastadion, Munich
Attendance: 59,000
Referee: Graham Poll (England)

23 November 2004
20:45

Bayern Munich (Germany)	5–1	(Israel) Maccabi Tel Aviv
Pizarro 12'; Salihamidžić 37'; Frings 44'; Makaay 71', 80'	Report	Dego 56' (pen.)

Olympiastadion, Munich
Attendance: 45,000
Referee: Luis Medina Cantalejo (Spain)
23 November 2004
20:45

Juventus (Italy)	1–0	(Netherlands) Ajax
Zalayeta 15'	Report

Stadio delle Alpi, Turin
Attendance: 6,865
Referee: Konrad Plautz (Austria)

8 December 2004
20:45 (21:45 UTC+2)

Maccabi Tel Aviv (Israel)	1–1	(Italy) Juventus
Dego 29' (pen.)	Report	Del Piero 71'

Ramat Gan Stadium, Ramat Gan
Attendance: 21,825
Referee: Alain Sars (France)
8 December 2004
20:45

Ajax (Netherlands)	2–2	(Germany) Bayern Munich
Galásek 38'; Mitea 64'	Report	Makaay 9'; Ballack 78'

Amsterdam Arena, Amsterdam
Attendance: 50,019
Referee: Lucílio Batista (Portugal)

=== Group D ===
Pos	Team	Pld	W	D	L	GF	GA	GD	Pts	Qualification	LYO	MUN	FEN	SPP
1	(France) Lyon	6	4	1	1	17	8	+9	13	Advance to knockout stage	—	2–2	4–2	5–0
2	(England) Manchester United	6	3	2	1	14	9	+5	11	Advance to knockout stage	2–1	—	6–2	4–1
3	(Turkey) Fenerbahçe	6	3	0	3	10	13	−3	9	Transfer to UEFA Cup	1–3	3–0	—	1–0
4	(Czech Republic) Sparta Prague	6	0	1	5	2	13	−11	1		1–2	0–0	0–1	—

15 September 2004
20:45 (21:45 UTC+3)

Fenerbahçe (Turkey)	1–0	(Czech Republic) Sparta Prague
Van Hooijdonk 16'	Report

Şükrü Saracoğlu Stadium, Istanbul
Attendance: 40,428
Referee: Lucílio Cortez Batista (Portugal)
15 September 2004
20:45

Lyon (France)	2–2	(England) Manchester United
Cris 35'; Frau 45'	Report	Van Nistelrooy 56', 61'

Stade de Gerland, Lyon
Attendance: 38,465
Referee: Wolfgang Stark (Germany)

28 September 2004
20:45 (19:45 UTC+1)

Manchester United (England)	6–2	(Turkey) Fenerbahçe
Giggs 7'; Rooney 17', 28', 54'; Van Nistelrooy 78'; Bellion 81'	Report	Nobre 46'; Tuncay 59'

Old Trafford, Manchester
Attendance: 67,128
Referee: Frank De Bleeckere (Belgium)
28 September 2004
20:45

Sparta Prague (Czech Republic)	1–2	(France) Lyon
Jun 7'	Report	Essien 25'; Wiltord 58'

Letná Stadium, Prague
Attendance: 12,060
Referee: Arturo Daudén Ibáñez (Spain)

19 October 2004
20:45

Sparta Prague (Czech Republic)	0–0	(England) Manchester United
	Report

Letná Stadium, Prague
Attendance: 20,654
Referee: Massimo De Santis (Italy)
19 October 2004
20:45 (21:45 UTC+3)

Fenerbahçe (Turkey)	1–3	(France) Lyon
Nobre 68'	Report	Juninho 55'; Cris 66'; Frau 87'

Şükrü Saracoğlu Stadium, Istanbul
Attendance: 41,764
Referee: Yuri Baskakov (Russia)

3 November 2004
20:45 (19:45 UTC+0)

Manchester United (England)	4–1	(Czech Republic) Sparta Prague
Van Nistelrooy 14', 25' (pen.), 60', 90+1'	Report	Zelenka 53'

Old Trafford, Manchester
Attendance: 66,706
Referee: Alain Hamer (Luxembourg)
3 November 2004
20:45

Lyon (France)	4–2	(Turkey) Fenerbahçe
Essien 22'; Malouda 53'; Nilmar 90+4', 90+6'	Report	Selçuk 14'; Tuncay 73'

Stade de Gerland, Lyon
Attendance: 37,767
Referee: Stefano Farina (Italy)

23 November 2004
20:45

Sparta Prague (Czech Republic)	0–1	(Turkey) Fenerbahçe
	Report	Kováč 20' (o.g.)

Letná Stadium, Prague
Attendance: 11,507
Referee: Wolfgang Stark (Germany)
23 November 2004
20:45 (19:45 UTC+0)

Manchester United (England)	2–1	(France) Lyon
Neville 19'; Van Nistelrooy 53'	Report	Diarra 40'

Old Trafford, Manchester
Attendance: 66,398
Referee: Kim Milton Nielsen (Denmark)

8 December 2004
20:45 (21:45 UTC+2)

Fenerbahçe (Turkey)	3–0	(England) Manchester United
Tuncay 47', 62', 90+1'	Report

Şükrü Saracoğlu Stadium, Istanbul
Attendance: 27,815
Referee: Arturo Daudén Ibáñez (Spain)
8 December 2004
20:45

Lyon (France)	5–0	(Czech Republic) Sparta Prague
Essien 7'; Nilmar 19', 51'; Idangar 83'; Bergougnoux 90+1'	Report

Stade de Gerland, Lyon
Attendance: 38,571
Referee: Konrad Plautz (Austria)

=== Group E ===
Pos	Team	Pld	W	D	L	GF	GA	GD	Pts	Qualification	ARS	PSV	PAN	ROS
1	(England) Arsenal	6	2	4	0	11	6	+5	10	Advance to knockout stage	—	1–0	1–1	5–1
2	(Netherlands) PSV Eindhoven	6	3	1	2	6	7	−1	10	Advance to knockout stage	1–1	—	1–0	1–0
3	(Greece) Panathinaikos	6	2	3	1	11	8	+3	9	Transfer to UEFA Cup	2–2	4–1	—	2–1
4	(Norway) Rosenborg	6	0	2	4	6	13	−7	2		1–1	1–2	2–2	—

14 September 2004
20:45 (21:45 UTC+3)

Panathinaikos (Greece)	2–1	(Norway) Rosenborg
González 43', 79'	Report	Johnsen 90'

Leoforos Alexandras Stadium, Athens
Attendance: 13,204
Referee: Paul Allaerts (Belgium)
14 September 2004
20:45 (19:45 UTC+1)

Arsenal (England)	1–0	(Netherlands) PSV Eindhoven
Alex 41' (o.g.)	Report

Highbury, London
Attendance: 34,068
Referee: Domenico Messina (Italy)

29 September 2004
20:45

PSV Eindhoven (Netherlands)	1–0	(Greece) Panathinaikos
Vennegoor of Hesselink 80'	Report

Philips Stadion, Eindhoven
Attendance: 26,500
Referee: Konrad Plautz (Austria)
29 September 2004
20:45

Rosenborg (Norway)	1–1	(England) Arsenal
Strand 52'	Report	Ljungberg 6'

Lerkendal Stadion, Trondheim
Attendance: 21,195
Referee: Florian Meyer (Germany)

20 October 2004
20:45

Rosenborg (Norway)	1–2	(Netherlands) PSV Eindhoven
Storflor 42'	Report	Farfán 26'; De Jong 86'

Lerkendal Stadion, Trondheim
Attendance: 20,950
Referee: Alain Sars (Belgium)
20 October 2004
20:45 (21:45 UTC+3)

Panathinaikos (Greece)	2–2	(England) Arsenal
González 65'; Olisadebe 82'	Report	Ljungberg 18'; Henry 74'

Leoforos Alexandras Stadium, Athens
Attendance: 12,346
Referee: Valentin Ivanov (Russia)

2 November 2004
20:45 (19:45 UTC+0)

Arsenal (England)	1–1	(Greece) Panathinaikos
Henry 16' (pen.)	Report	Cygan 75' (o.g.)

Highbury, London
Attendance: 35,137
Referee: Luis Medina Cantalejo (Spain)
2 November 2004
20:45

PSV Eindhoven (Netherlands)	1–0	(Norway) Rosenborg
Beasley 10'	Report

Philips Stadion, Eindhoven
Attendance: 26,250
Referee: Arturo Daudén Ibáñez (Spain)

24 November 2004
20:45

Rosenborg (Norway)	2–2	(Greece) Panathinaikos
Helstad 68', 76'	Report	Konstantinou 16'; Skácel 71'

Lerkendal Stadion, Trondheim
Attendance: 20,591
Referee: Massimo de Santis (Italy)
24 November 2004
20:45

PSV Eindhoven (Netherlands)	1–1	(England) Arsenal
Ooijer 8'	Report	Henry 31'

Philips Stadion, Eindhoven
Attendance: 33,000
Referee: Herbert Fandel (Germany)

7 December 2004
20:45 (21:45 UTC+2)

Panathinaikos (Greece)	4–1	(Netherlands) PSV Eindhoven
Papadopoulos 30'; Münch 45' (pen.), 57'; Sânmărtean 81'	Report	Beasley 37'

Leoforos Alexandras Stadium, Athens
Attendance: 10,196
Referee: Peter Fröjdfeldt (Sweden)
7 December 2004
20:45 (19:45 UTC+0)

Arsenal (England)	5–1	(Norway) Rosenborg
Reyes 3'; Henry 24'; Fàbregas 29'; Pires 41' (pen.); Van Persie 84'	Report	Hoftun 38'

Highbury, London
Attendance: 35,421
Referee: Stefano Farina (Italy)

=== Group F ===
Pos	Team	Pld	W	D	L	GF	GA	GD	Pts	Qualification	MIL	BAR	SHK	CEL
1	(Italy) Milan	6	4	1	1	10	3	+7	13	Advance to knockout stage	—	1–0	4–0	3–1
2	(Spain) Barcelona	6	3	1	2	9	6	+3	10	Advance to knockout stage	2–1	—	3–0	1–1
3	(Ukraine) Shakhtar Donetsk	6	2	0	4	5	9	−4	6	Transfer to UEFA Cup	0–1	2–0	—	3–0
4	(Scotland) Celtic	6	1	2	3	4	10	−6	5		0–0	1–3	1–0	—

14 September 2004
20:45 (21:45 UTC+3)

Shakhtar Donetsk (Ukraine)	0–1	(Italy) Milan
	Report	Seedorf 84'

RSC Olimpiyskiy, Donetsk
Attendance: 25,092
Referee: Herbert Fandel (Germany)
14 September 2004
20:45 (19:45 UTC+1)

Celtic (Scotland)	1–3	(Spain) Barcelona
Sutton 59'	Report	Deco 20'; Giuly 78'; Larsson 82'

Celtic Park, Glasgow
Attendance: 58,589
Referee: Markus Merk (Germany)

29 September 2004
20:45

Barcelona (Spain)	3–0	(Ukraine) Shakhtar Donetsk
Deco 15'; Ronaldinho 64' (pen.); Eto'o 89'	Report

Camp Nou, Barcelona
Attendance: 64,148
Referee: Terje Hauge (Norway)
29 September 2004
20:45

Milan (Italy)	3–1	(Scotland) Celtic
Shevchenko 8'; Inzaghi 89'; Pirlo 90+1'	Report	Varga 74'

San Siro, Milan
Attendance: 52,648
Referee: Gilles Veissière (France)

20 October 2004
20:45

Milan (Italy)	1–0	(Spain) Barcelona
Shevchenko 31'	Report

San Siro, Milan
Attendance: 76,502
Referee: Graham Poll (England)
20 October 2004
20:45 (21:45 UTC+3)

Shakhtar Donetsk (Ukraine)	3–0	(Scotland) Celtic
Matuzalém 57', 62'; Brandão 78'	Report

RSC Olimpiyskiy, Donetsk
Attendance: 25,011
Referee: René Temmink (Netherlands)

2 November 2004
20:45

Barcelona (Spain)	2–1	(Italy) Milan
Eto'o 37'; Ronaldinho 89'	Report	Shevchenko 17'

Camp Nou, Barcelona
Attendance: 94,682
Referee: Urs Meier (Switzerland)
2 November 2004
20:45 (19:45 UTC+0)

Celtic (Scotland)	1–0	(Ukraine) Shakhtar Donetsk
Thompson 25'	Report

Celtic Park, Glasgow
Attendance: 58,347
Referee: Éric Poulat (France)

24 November 2004
20:45

Milan (Italy)	4–0	(Ukraine) Shakhtar Donetsk
Kaká 52', 90+2'; Crespo 53', 85'	Report

San Siro, Milan
Attendance: 38,841
Referee: Frank De Bleeckere (Belgium)
24 November 2004
20:45

Barcelona (Spain)	1–1	(Scotland) Celtic
Eto'o 24'	Report	Hartson 45'

Camp Nou, Barcelona
Attendance: 74,119
Referee: Ľuboš Micheľ (Slovakia)

7 December 2004
20:45 (21:45 UTC+2)

Shakhtar Donetsk (Ukraine)	2–0	(Spain) Barcelona
Aghahowa 14', 22'	Report

RSC Olimpiyskiy, Donetsk
Attendance: 24,236
Referee: Claus Bo Larsen (Denmark)
7 December 2004
20:45 (19:45 UTC+0)

Celtic (Scotland)	0–0	(Italy) Milan
	Report

Celtic Park, Glasgow
Attendance: 59,228
Referee: Kyros Vassaras (Greece)

=== Group G ===
Pos	Team	Pld	W	D	L	GF	GA	GD	Pts	Qualification	INT	BRM	VAL	AND
1	(Italy) Internazionale	6	4	2	0	14	3	+11	14	Advance to knockout stage	—	2–0	0–0	3–0
2	(Germany) Werder Bremen	6	4	1	1	12	6	+6	13	Advance to knockout stage	1–1	—	2–1	5–1
3	(Spain) Valencia	6	2	1	3	6	10	−4	7	Transfer to UEFA Cup	1–5	0–2	—	2–0
4	(Belgium) Anderlecht	6	0	0	6	4	17	−13	0		1–3	1–2	1–2	—

14 September 2004
20:45

Internazionale (Italy)	2–0	(Germany) Werder Bremen
Adriano 34' (pen.), 89'	Report

San Siro, Milan
Attendance: 28,584
Referee: Ľuboš Micheľ (Slovakia)
14 September 2004
20:45

Valencia (Spain)	2–0	(Belgium) Anderlecht
Vicente 16'; Baraja 45'	Report

Mestalla, Valencia
Attendance: 31,102
Referee: Bertrand Layec (France)

29 September 2004
20:45

Werder Bremen (Germany)	2–1	(Spain) Valencia
Klose 60'; Charisteas 84'	Report	Vicente 2'

Weserstadion, Bremen
Attendance: 36,034
Referee: Mike Riley (England)
29 September 2004
20:45

Anderlecht (Belgium)	1–3	(Italy) Internazionale
Baseggio 90+4'	Report	Martins 9'; Adriano 51'; Stanković 55'

Constant Vanden Stock Stadium, Brussels
Attendance: 21,845
Referee: Kyros Vassaras (Greece)

20 October 2004
20:45

Anderlecht (Belgium)	1–2	(Germany) Werder Bremen
Wilhelmsson 26'	Report	Klasnić 36', 59'

Constant Vanden Stock Stadium, Brussels
Attendance: 21,528
Referee: Claus Bo Larsen (Denmark)
20 October 2004
20:45

Valencia (Spain)	1–5	(Italy) Internazionale
Aimar 73'	Report	Stanković 47'; Vieri 49'; Van der Meyde 76'; Adriano 81'; Cruz 90+1'

Mestalla, Valencia
Attendance: 36,560
Referee: Urs Meier (Switzerland)

2 November 2004
20:45

Werder Bremen (Germany)	5–1	(Belgium) Anderlecht
Klasnić 2', 16', 79'; Klose 33'; Jensen 90'	Report	Iachtchouk 30'

Weserstadion, Bremen
Attendance: 37,579
Referee: Massimo Busacca (Switzerland)
2 November 2004
20:45

Internazionale (Italy)	0–0	(Spain) Valencia
	Report

San Siro, Milan
Attendance: 36,588
Referee: Valentin Ivanov (Russia)

24 November 2004
20:45

Anderlecht (Belgium)	1–2	(Spain) Valencia
Wilhelmsson 24'	Report	Corradi 19'; Di Vaio 48'

Constant Vanden Stock Stadium, Brussels
Attendance: 20,866
Referee: Tom Henning Øvrebø (Norway)
24 November 2004
20:45

Werder Bremen (Germany)	1–1	(Italy) Internazionale
Ismaël 49' (pen.)	Report	Martins 55'

Weserstadion, Bremen
Attendance: 36,728
Referee: Gilles Veissière (France)

7 December 2004
20:45

Valencia (Spain)	0–2	(Germany) Werder Bremen
	Report	Valdez 83', 90+2'

Mestalla, Valencia
Attendance: 40,263
Referee: Anders Frisk (Sweden)
7 December 2004
20:45

Internazionale (Italy)	3–0	(Belgium) Anderlecht
Cruz 33'; Martins 60', 63'	Report

San Siro, Milan
Attendance: 21,849
Referee: Mike Riley (England)

=== Group H ===
Pos	Team	Pld	W	D	L	GF	GA	GD	Pts	Qualification	CHE	POR	CSKA	PAR
1	(England) Chelsea	6	4	1	1	10	3	+7	13	Advance to knockout stage	—	3–1	2–0	0–0
2	(Portugal) Porto	6	2	2	2	4	6	−2	8	Advance to knockout stage	2–1	—	0–0	0–0
3	(Russia) CSKA Moscow	6	2	1	3	5	5	0	7	Transfer to UEFA Cup	0–1	0–1	—	2–0
4	(France) Paris Saint-Germain	6	1	2	3	3	8	−5	5		0–3	2–0	1–3	—

14 September 2004
20:45

Paris Saint-Germain (France)	0–3	(England) Chelsea
	Report	Terry 29'; Drogba 45+1', 76'

Parc des Princes, Paris
Attendance: 40,930
Referee: Manuel Mejuto González (Spain)
14 September 2004
20:45 (19:45 UTC+1)

Porto (Portugal)	0–0	(Russia) CSKA Moscow
	Report

Estádio do Dragão, Porto
Attendance: 39,309
Referee: Kim Milton Nielsen (Denmark)

29 September 2004
18:30 (20:30 UTC+4)

CSKA Moscow (Russia)	2–0	(France) Paris Saint-Germain
Semak 64'; Vágner Love 77' (pen.)	Report

Lokomotiv Stadium, Moscow
Attendance: 26,000
Referee: Massimo Busacca (Switzerland)
29 September 2004
20:45 (19:45 UTC+1)

Chelsea (England)	3–1	(Portugal) Porto
Smertin 7'; Drogba 50'; Terry 70'	Report	McCarthy 68'

Stamford Bridge, London
Attendance: 39,237
Referee: Herbert Fandel (Germany)

20 October 2004
20:45 (19:45 UTC+1)

Chelsea (England)	2–0	(Russia) CSKA Moscow
Terry 9'; Guðjohnsen 45+1'	Report

Stamford Bridge, London
Attendance: 33,945
Referee: Ľuboš Micheľ (Slovakia)
20 October 2004
20:45

Paris Saint-Germain (France)	2–0	(Portugal) Porto
Coridon 30'; Pauleta 31'	Report

Parc des Princes, Paris
Attendance: 41,000
Referee: Pierluigi Collina (Italy)

2 November 2004
18:30 (20:30 UTC+3)

CSKA Moscow (Russia)	0–1	(England) Chelsea
	Report	Robben 24'

Lokomotiv Stadium, Moscow
Attendance: 27,495
Referee: Massimo De Santis (Italy)
2 November 2004
20:45 (19:45 UTC+0)

Porto (Portugal)	0–0	(France) Paris Saint-Germain
	Report

Estádio do Dragão, Porto
Attendance: 30,210
Referee: Stuart Dougal (Scotland)

24 November 2004
18:30 (20:30 UTC+3)

CSKA Moscow (Russia)	0–1	(Portugal) Porto
	Report	McCarthy 28'

Lokomotiv Stadium, Moscow
Attendance: 16,800
Referee: Manuel Mejuto González (Spain)
24 November 2004
20:45 (19:45 UTC+0)

Chelsea (England)	0–0	(France) Paris Saint-Germain
	Report

Stamford Bridge, London
Attendance: 39,626
Referee: René Temmink (Netherlands)

7 December 2004
20:45

Paris Saint-Germain (France)	1–3	(Russia) CSKA Moscow
Pancrate 37'	Report	Semak 28', 64', 70'

Parc des Princes, Paris
Attendance: 41,987
Referee: Markus Merk (Germany)
7 December 2004
20:45 (19:45 UTC+0)

Porto (Portugal)	2–1	(England) Chelsea
Diego 61'; McCarthy 86'	Report	Duff 34'

Estádio do Dragão, Porto
Attendance: 42,409
Referee: Massimo Busacca (Switzerland)
