= Claudio Scarzanella =

Italian footballer (born 1986)

Personal information
- Full name: Claudio Scarzanella
- Date of birth: 12 March 1986 (age 40)
- Place of birth: Bagno a Ripoli, Italy
- Position: Goalkeeper

Team information
- Current team: Ternana

Youth career
- Juventus

Senior career*
Years	Team	Apps	(Gls)
2006–2007	Crotone (loan)	2	(0)
2007–	Ternana		
- * Club domestic league appearances and goals

Claudio Scarzanella (born 12 March 1986) is an Italian footballer who plays as a goalkeeper. He played for Ternana during the 2007–08 season.

He spent the 2006–07 Serie B season on loan with F.C. Crotone from Juventus; however, he only featured twice for the club.
