= 2004–05 UEFA Champions League knockout stage =

International football competition

The knockout stage of the 2004–05 UEFA Champions League featured the 16 teams that had finished in the top two of each of the eight groups in the group stage and lasted from 22 February to 25 May 2005.

The final pitted four-time European Cup winners Liverpool of England against six-time winners Milan of Italy. After Milan went 3–0 up in the first half, Liverpool scored three goals in the space of six second-half minutes before winning the match 3–2 on penalties in what has since become known as the "Miracle of Istanbul."

Times are CET/CEST, (Note: CET (UTC+1) for matches to 15 March 2005, and CEST (UTC+2) for matches from 5 April 2005.) as listed by UEFA (local times, if different, are in parentheses).

== Format ==
The knockout stage followed a simple, single-elimination format, with the ties in each round (except for the final) being played over two legs, with whichever team scored the most goals over the course of the two legs progressing to the next round. In the case of both teams scoring the same number of goals over the two legs, the winner was determined by whichever team scored more goals in their away leg. If the teams could still not be separated, a period of extra time lasting 30 minutes (split into two 15-minute halves) was played. If the scores were still level after extra time, the winner was decided via a penalty shoot-out. As in every season of the competition, the final was played as a single match at a neutral venue, which in 2005 was the Atatürk Olympic Stadium in Istanbul, Turkey.

== Qualified teams ==
Key to colours
Seeded in round of 16 draw
Unseeded in round of 16 draw

Group	Winners	Runners-up
A	(France) Monaco	(England) Liverpool
B	(Germany) Bayer Leverkusen	(Spain) Real Madrid
C	(Italy) Juventus	(Germany) Bayern Munich
D	(France) Lyon	(England) Manchester United
E	(England) Arsenal	(Netherlands) PSV Eindhoven
F	(Italy) Milan	(Spain) Barcelona
G	(Italy) Internazionale	(Germany) Werder Bremen
H	(England) Chelsea	(Portugal) Porto

== Bracket ==
Round of 16
(England) Manchester United	0	0	0
(Italy) Milan	1	1	2
(Portugal) Porto	1	1	2
(Italy) Internazionale	1	3	4
(Germany) Werder Bremen	0	2	2
(France) Lyon	3	7	10
(Netherlands) PSV Eindhoven	1	2	3
(France) Monaco	0	0	0
(Spain) Barcelona	2	2	4
(England) Chelsea	1	4	5
(Germany) Bayern Munich	3	0	3
(England) Arsenal	1	1	2
(England) Liverpool	3	3	6
(Germany) Bayer Leverkusen	1	1	2
(Spain) Real Madrid	1	0	1
(Italy) Juventus (a.e.t.)	0	2	2

Quarter-finals
(Italy) Milan	2	3	5
(Italy) Internazionale	0	0	0
(France) Lyon	1	1	2 (2)
(Netherlands) PSV Eindhoven (p)	1	1	2 (4)
(England) Chelsea	4	2	6
(Germany) Bayern Munich	2	3	5
(England) Liverpool	2	0	2
(Italy) Juventus	1	0	1

Semi-finals
(Italy) Milan (a)	2	1	3
(Netherlands) PSV Eindhoven	0	3	3
(England) Chelsea	0	0	0
(England) Liverpool	0	1	1

Final
25 May – Istanbul
(Italy) Milan	3 (2)
(England) Liverpool (p)	3 (3)

== Round of 16 ==
=== Summary ===
Team 1	Agg.	Team 2	1st leg	2nd leg
Real Madrid (Spain)	1–2	(Italy) Juventus	1–0	0–2 (a.e.t.)
Liverpool (England)	6–2	(Germany) Bayer Leverkusen	3–1	3–1
PSV Eindhoven (Netherlands)	3–0	(France) Monaco	1–0	2–0
Bayern Munich (Germany)	3–2	(England) Arsenal	3–1	0–1
Barcelona (Spain)	4–5	(England) Chelsea	2–1	2–4
Manchester United (England)	0–2	(Italy) Milan	0–1	0–1
Werder Bremen (Germany)	2–10	(France) Lyon	0–3	2–7
Porto (Portugal)	2–4	(Italy) Internazionale	1–1	1–3

=== Matches ===
22 February 2005
20:45

Real Madrid (Spain)	1–0	(Italy) Juventus
Helguera 31'	Report

Santiago Bernabéu, Madrid
Attendance: 72,304
Referee: Ľuboš Micheľ (Slovakia)
9 March 2005
20:45

Juventus (Italy)	2–0 (a.e.t.)	(Spain) Real Madrid
Trezeguet 75'; Zalayeta 116'	Report

Stadio delle Alpi, Turin
Attendance: 58,956
Referee: Markus Merk (Germany)

Juventus won 2–1 on aggregate.

22 February 2005
20:45 (19:45 UTC+0)

Liverpool (England)	3–1	(Germany) Bayer Leverkusen
García 15'; Riise 35'; Hamann 90+2'	Report	França 90+3'

Anfield, Liverpool
Attendance: 40,942
Referee: Kyros Vassaras (Greece)
9 March 2005
20:45

Bayer Leverkusen (Germany)	1–3	(England) Liverpool
Krzynówek 88'	Report	García 28', 32'; Baroš 67'

BayArena, Leverkusen
Attendance: 22,500
Referee: Alain Sars (France)

Liverpool won 6–2 on aggregate.

22 February 2005
20:45

PSV Eindhoven (Netherlands)	1–0	(France) Monaco
Alex 8'	Report

Philips Stadion, Eindhoven
Attendance: 31,225
Referee: Luis Medina Cantalejo (Spain)
9 March 2005
20:45

Monaco (France)	0–2	(Netherlands) PSV Eindhoven
	Report	Vennegoor of Hesselink 26'; Beasley 69'

Stade Louis II, Monaco
Attendance: 15,523
Referee: Steve Bennett (England)

PSV Eindhoven won 3–0 on aggregate.

22 February 2005
20:45

Bayern Munich (Germany)	3–1	(England) Arsenal
Pizarro 4', 58'; Salihamidžić 65'	Report	Touré 88'

Olympiastadion, Munich
Attendance: 59,000
Referee: Kim Milton Nielsen (Denmark)
9 March 2005
20:45 (19:45 UTC+0)

Arsenal (England)	1–0	(Germany) Bayern Munich
Henry 66'	Report

Highbury, London
Attendance: 35,463
Referee: Massimo De Santis (Italy)

Bayern Munich won 3–2 on aggregate.

23 February 2005
20:45

Barcelona (Spain)	2–1	(England) Chelsea
M. López 67'; Eto'o 73'	Report	Belletti 33' (o.g.)

Camp Nou, Barcelona
Attendance: 96,560
Referee: Anders Frisk (Sweden)
8 March 2005
20:45 (19:45 UTC+0)

Chelsea (England)	4–2	(Spain) Barcelona
Guðjohnsen 8'; Lampard 17'; Duff 19'; Terry 76'	Report	Ronaldinho 27' (pen.), 38'

Stamford Bridge, London
Attendance: 41,515
Referee: Pierluigi Collina (Italy)

Chelsea won 5–4 on aggregate.

23 February 2005
20:45 (19:45 UTC+0)

Manchester United (England)	0–1	(Italy) Milan
	Report	Crespo 78'

Old Trafford, Manchester
Attendance: 67,112
Referee: Manuel Mejuto González (Spain)
8 March 2005
20:45

Milan (Italy)	1–0	(England) Manchester United
Crespo 61'	Report

San Siro, Milan
Attendance: 79,103
Referee: Herbert Fandel (Germany)

Milan won 2–0 on aggregate.

23 February 2005
20:45

Werder Bremen (Germany)	0–3	(France) Lyon
	Report	Wiltord 9'; Diarra 77'; Juninho 80'

Weserstadion, Bremen
Attendance: 36,923
Referee: Frank De Bleeckere (Belgium)
8 March 2005
20:45

Lyon (France)	7–2	(Germany) Werder Bremen
Wiltord 8', 55', 63'; Essien 17', 30'; Malouda 60'; Berthod 80' (pen.)	Report	Micoud 32'; Ismaël 57' (pen.)

Stade de Gerland, Lyon
Attendance: 38,922
Referee: Valentin Ivanov (Russia)

Lyon won 10–2 on aggregate.

23 February 2005
20:45 (19:45 UTC+0)

Porto (Portugal)	1–1	(Italy) Internazionale
R. Costa 61'	Report	Martins 24'

Estádio do Dragão, Porto
Attendance: 38,177
Referee: Graham Poll (England)
15 March 2005
20:45

Internazionale (Italy)	3–1	(Portugal) Porto
Adriano 6', 63', 87'	Report	J. Costa 69'

San Siro, Milan
Attendance: 70,560
Referee: Terje Hauge (Norway)

Internazionale won 4–2 on aggregate.

== Quarter-finals ==
=== Summary ===
Team 1	Agg.	Team 2	1st leg	2nd leg
Liverpool (England)	2–1	(Italy) Juventus	2–1	0–0
Lyon (France)	2–2 (2–4 p)	(Netherlands) PSV Eindhoven	1–1	1–1 (a.e.t.)
Chelsea (England)	6–5	(Germany) Bayern Munich	4–2	2–3
Milan (Italy)	5–0	(Italy) Internazionale	2–0	3–0 (Note: Match was abandoned after 72 minutes as Milan led 1–0 due to flares thrown onto the pitch by Internazionale fans, one of which struck Milan goalkeeper Dida. UEFA awarded Milan a 3–0 win (5–0 aggregate) and ordered Internazionale to play their next four European games behind closed doors.)

=== Matches ===
5 April 2005
20:45 (19:45 UTC+1)

Liverpool (England)	2–1	(Italy) Juventus
Hyypiä 10'; García 25'	Report	Cannavaro 63'

Anfield, Liverpool
Attendance: 41,216
Referee: Frank De Bleeckere (Belgium)
13 April 2005
20:45

Juventus (Italy)	0–0	(England) Liverpool
	Report

Stadio delle Alpi, Turin
Attendance: 55,464
Referee: Valentin Ivanov (Russia)

Liverpool won 2–1 on aggregate.

5 April 2005
20:45

Lyon (France)	1–1	(Netherlands) PSV Eindhoven
Malouda 12'	Report	Cocu 79'

Stade de Gerland, Lyon
Attendance: 39,178
Referee: Pierluigi Collina (Italy)
13 April 2005
20:45

PSV Eindhoven (Netherlands)	1–1 (a.e.t.)	(France) Lyon
Alex 50'	Report	Wiltord 10'
Penalties
Robert (penalty scored); Beasley (penalty missed); Bouma (penalty scored); Ooijer (penalty scored); Van Bommel (penalty scored)	4–2	(penalty missed) Abidal; (penalty scored) Ben Arfa; (penalty missed) Essien; (penalty scored) Juninho

Philips Stadion, Eindhoven
Attendance: 35,100
Referee: Kim Milton Nielsen (Denmark)

2–2 on aggregate; PSV Eindhoven won 4–2 on penalties.

6 April 2005
20:45 (19:45 UTC+1)

Chelsea (England)	4–2	(Germany) Bayern Munich
J. Cole 4'; Lampard 60', 70'; Drogba 81'	Report	Schweinsteiger 52'; Ballack 90+3' (pen.)

Stamford Bridge, London
Attendance: 40,253
Referee: Rene Temmink (Netherlands)
12 April 2005
20:45

Bayern Munich (Germany)	3–2	(England) Chelsea
Pizarro 65'; Guerrero 90'; Scholl 90+5'	Report	Lampard 30'; Drogba 80'

Olympiastadion, Munich
Attendance: 59,000
Referee: Manuel Mejuto González (Spain)

Chelsea won 6–5 on aggregate.

6 April 2005
20:45

Milan (Italy)	2–0	(Italy) Internazionale
Stam 45+1'; Shevchenko 74'	Report

San Siro, Milan
Attendance: 78,958
Referee: Alain Sars (France)
12 April 2005
20:45

Internazionale (Italy)	0–3 Awarded (Note: The Internazionale v Milan second leg match was abandoned after 72 minutes as Milan lead 1–0 due to flares thrown onto the pitch by Internazionale fans, one of which struck Milan goalkeeper Dida. UEFA awarded Milan a 3–0 win (5–0 aggregate) and ordered Internazionale to play their next four European games behind closed doors.)	(Italy) Milan
	Report	Shevchenko 30'

San Siro, Milan
Attendance: 82,734
Referee: Markus Merk (Germany)

Milan won 5–0 on aggregate.

== Semi-finals ==
=== Summary ===
Team 1	Agg.	Team 2	1st leg	2nd leg
Chelsea (England)	0–1	(England) Liverpool	0–0	0–1
Milan (Italy)	3–3 (a)	(Netherlands) PSV Eindhoven	2–0	1–3

=== Matches ===
27 April 2005
20:45 (19:45 UTC+1)

Chelsea (England)	0–0	(England) Liverpool
	Report

Stamford Bridge, London
Attendance: 40,497
Referee: Alain Sars (France)
3 May 2005
20:45 (19:45 UTC+1)

Liverpool (England)	1–0	(England) Chelsea
García 4'	Report

Anfield, Liverpool
Attendance: 42,342
Referee: Ľuboš Micheľ (Slovakia)

Liverpool won 1–0 on aggregate.

26 April 2005
20:45

Milan (Italy)	2–0	(Netherlands) PSV Eindhoven
Shevchenko 42'; Tomasson 90'	Report

San Siro, Milan
Attendance: 74,655
Referee: Kyros Vassaras (Greece)
4 May 2005
20:45

PSV Eindhoven (Netherlands)	3–1	(Italy) Milan
Park 9'; Cocu 65', 90+2'	Report	Ambrosini 90+1'

Philips Stadion, Eindhoven
Attendance: 35,100
Referee: Terje Hauge (Norway)

3–3 on aggregate; Milan won on away goals.

== Final ==
The final was played on 25 May 2005 at the Atatürk Olympic Stadium in Istanbul, Turkey.

25 May 2005
20:45 (21:45 UTC+3)

Milan (Italy)	3–3 (a.e.t.)	(England) Liverpool
Maldini 1'; Crespo 39', 44'	Report	Gerrard 54'; Šmicer 56'; Alonso 60'
Penalties
Serginho (penalty missed); Pirlo (penalty missed); Tomasson (penalty scored); Kaká (penalty scored); Shevchenko (penalty missed)	2–3	(penalty scored) Hamann; (penalty scored) Cissé; (penalty missed) Riise; (penalty scored) Šmicer

Atatürk Olympic Stadium, Istanbul
Attendance: 69,000
Referee: Manuel Mejuto González (Spain)
