= 2004–05 UEFA Champions League =

European football tournament

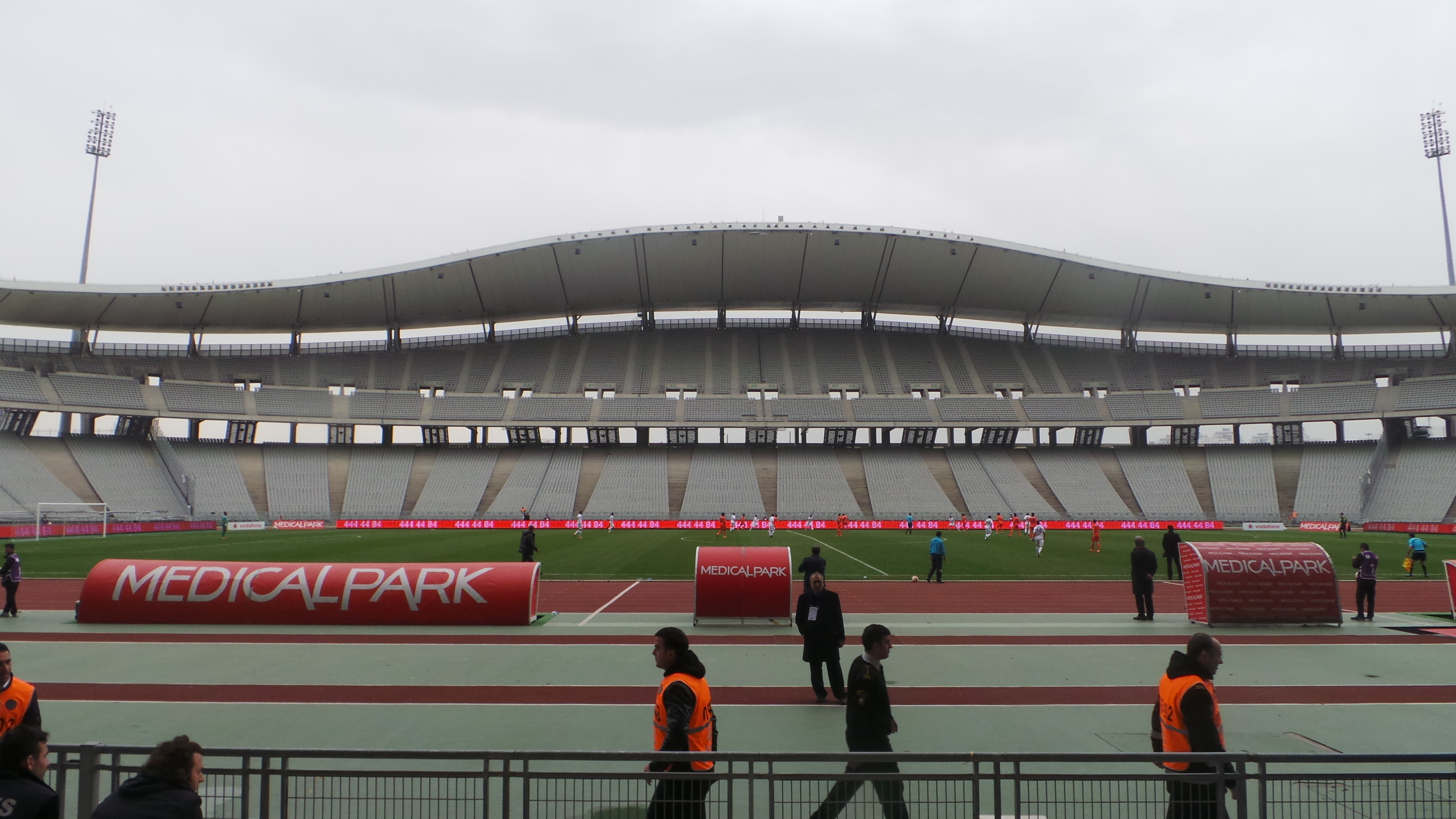
- The Atatürk Olympic Stadium in Istanbul hosted the final

Tournament details
- Dates: Qualifying: 13 July – 25 August 2004; Competition proper: 14 September 2004 – 25 May 2005
- Teams: Competition proper: 32; Total: 72

Final positions
- Champions: (England) Liverpool (5th title)
- Runners-up: (Italy) Milan

Tournament statistics
- Matches played: 125
- Goals scored: 335 (2.68 per match)
- Attendance: 4,945,419 (39,563 per match)
- Top scorer(s): Ruud van Nistelrooy (Manchester United); 8 goals

The 2004–05 UEFA Champions League was the 50th season of UEFA's premier European club football tournament, and the 13th since it was rebranded as the UEFA Champions League in 1992. The competition was won by Liverpool, who beat Milan on penalties in the final, having come back from 3–0 down at half-time. Liverpool captain Steven Gerrard was named as UEFA's Footballer of the Year for his key role in the final and throughout the Champions League season. The final, played at the Atatürk Olympic Stadium in Istanbul, Turkey, is often regarded as one of the best in the history of the tournament.

As it was their fifth European Cup title, Liverpool were awarded the trophy permanently, and received the UEFA Badge of Honour. A new trophy was made for the 2005–06 season. As winners of the competition, Liverpool went on to represent Europe at the 2005 FIFA Club World Championship.

Porto were the defending champions, but were eliminated by Milan's cross-city rivals Inter in the round of 16.

== Association team allocation ==
A total of 72 teams from 48 of the 52 UEFA member associations participated in the 2004–05 UEFA Champions League (the exception being Liechtenstein, which does not organise a domestic league, Andorra and San Marino). Kazakhstan also did not participate this year as none of their clubs were able to obtain UEFA licence. The association ranking based on the UEFA country coefficients was used to determine the number of participating teams for each association:

- Associations 1–3 each have four teams qualify.
- Associations 4–6 each have three teams qualify.
- Associations 7–15 each have two teams qualify.
- Associations 16–49 (except Liechtenstein) each have one team qualify.

=== Association ranking ===
For the 2004–05 UEFA Champions League, the associations are allocated places according to their 2003 UEFA country coefficients, which takes into account their performance in European competitions from 1998–1999 to 2002–03.

Apart from the allocation based on the country coefficients, associations may have additional teams participating in the Champions League, as noted below:

Rank	Association	Coeff.	Teams
1	Spain	75.539	4
2	Italy	62.311	4
3	England	58.340	4
4	Germany	51.132	3
5	France	43.468	3
6	Greece	36.782	3
7	Portugal	35.583	2
8	Netherlands	33.498	2
9	Scotland	30.375	2
10	Turkey	28.991	2
11	Belgium	28.500	2
12	Czech Republic	27.950	2
13	Switzerland	26.250	2
14	Ukraine	24.583	2
15	Israel	23.999	2
16	Austria	23.375	1
17	Poland	21.625	1
18	Russia	21.041	1

Rank	Association	Coeff.	Teams
19	Serbia and Montenegro	19.831	1
20	Norway	19.575	1
21	Bulgaria	18.665	1
22	Croatia	18.625	1
23	Sweden	17.591	1
24	Denmark	17.375	1
25	Slovakia	13.665	1
26	Romania	12.957	1
27	Hungary	12.790	1
28	Cyprus	10.165	1
29	Slovenia	9.332	1
30	Finland	7.208	1
31	Latvia	6.665	1
32	Moldova	5.832	1
33	Georgia	5.666	1
34	Bosnia and Herzegovina	4.333	1
35	Lithuania	3.998	1
36	Iceland	3.498	1

Rank	Association	Coeff.	Teams
37	Macedonia	3.497	1
38	Belarus	3.416	1
39	Republic of Ireland	3.331	1
40	Malta	2.998	1
41	Armenia	2.165	1
42	Wales	2.165	1
43	Liechtenstein	2.000	0
44	Albania	1.831	1
45	Estonia	1.665	1
46	Northern Ireland	1.498	1
47	Luxembourg	1.332	1
48	Faroe Islands	1.165	1
49	Azerbaijan	1.165	1
50	Kazakhstan	0.500	0
51	Andorra	0.000	0
52	San Marino	0.000	0

=== Distribution ===
Since the title holders (Porto) qualified for the Champions League group stage through their domestic league, and the group stage spot reserved for the title holders is vacated, while no team from Kazakhstan was admitted, the following changes to the default access list are made:

- The champions of association 10 (Turkey) are promoted from the third qualifying round to the group stage.
- The champions of association 16 (Austria) are promoted from the second qualifying round to the third qualifying round.
- The champions of associations 26, 27 and 28 (Romania, Hungary and Cyprus) are promoted from the first qualifying round to the second qualifying round.

	Teams entering in this round	Teams advancing from previous round
First qualifying round (20 teams)	20 champions from associations 29–49 (except Liechtenstein)	
Second qualifying round (28 teams)	12 champions from associations 17–28; 6 runners-up from associations 10–15	10 winners from the first qualifying round
Third qualifying round (32 teams)	6 champions from associations 11–16; 3 runners-up from associations 7–9; 6 third-place finishers from associations 1–6; 3 fourth-place finishers from associations 1–3	14 winners from the second qualifying round
Group stage (32 teams)	10 champions from associations 1–10 (including title holders Porto); 6 runners-up from associations 1–6	16 winners from the third qualifying round
Knockout phase (16 teams)		8 group winners from the group stage; 8 group runners-up from the group stage

=== Teams ===
League positions of the previous season shown in parentheses (TH: Champions League title holders).

Group stage
(Spain) Valencia (1st)	(England) Arsenal (1st)	(France) Lyon (1st)	(Portugal) Porto (1st)^{TH}
(Spain) Barcelona (2nd)	(England) Chelsea (2nd)	(France) Paris Saint-Germain (2nd)	(Netherlands) Ajax (1st)
(Italy) Milan (1st)	(Germany) Werder Bremen (1st)	(Greece) Panathinaikos (1st)	(Scotland) Celtic (1st)
(Italy) Roma (2nd)	(Germany) Bayern Munich (2nd)	(Greece) Olympiacos (2nd)	(Turkey) Fenerbahçe (1st)
Third qualifying round
(Spain) Deportivo La Coruña (3rd)	(England) Liverpool (4th)	(Netherlands) PSV Eindhoven (2nd)	(Switzerland) Basel (1st)
(Spain) Real Madrid (4th)	(Germany) Bayer Leverkusen (3rd)	(Scotland) Rangers (2nd)	(Ukraine) Dynamo Kyiv (1st)
(Italy) Juventus (3rd)	(France) Monaco (3rd)	(Belgium) Anderlecht (1st)	(Israel) Maccabi Haifa (1st)
(Italy) Internazionale (4th)	(Greece) PAOK (3rd)	(Czech Republic) Baník Ostrava (1st)	(Austria) GAK (1st)
(England) Manchester United (3rd)	(Portugal) Benfica (2nd)		
Second qualifying round
(Turkey) Trabzonspor (2nd)	(Israel) Maccabi Tel Aviv (2nd)	(Bulgaria) Lokomotiv Plovdiv (1st)	(Slovakia) Žilina (1st)
(Belgium) Club Brugge (2nd)	(Poland) Wisła Kraków (1st)	(Croatia) Hajduk Split (1st)	(Romania) Dinamo București (1st)
(Czech Republic) Sparta Prague (2nd)	(Russia) CSKA Moscow (1st)	(Sweden) Djurgårdens IF (1st)	(Hungary) Ferencváros (1st)
(Switzerland) Young Boys (2nd)	(Serbia and Montenegro) Red Star Belgrade (1st)	(Denmark) Copenhagen (1st)	(Cyprus) APOEL (1st)
(Ukraine) Shakhtar Donetsk (2nd)	(Norway) Rosenborg (1st)		
First qualifying round
(Slovenia) HIT Gorica (1st)	(Bosnia and Herzegovina) Široki Brijeg (1st)	(Republic of Ireland) Shelbourne (1st)	(Estonia) Flora (1st)
(Finland) HJK (1st)	(Lithuania) Kaunas (1st)	(Malta) Sliema Wanderers (1st)	(Northern Ireland) Linfield (1st)
(Latvia) Skonto (1st)	(Iceland) KR (1st)	(Armenia) Pyunik (1st)	(Luxembourg) Jeunesse Esch (1st)
(Moldova) Sheriff Tiraspol (1st)	(North Macedonia) Pobeda (1st)	(Wales) Rhyl (1st)	(Faroe Islands) HB (1st)
(Georgia (country)) WIT Georgia (1st)	(Belarus) Gomel (1st)	(Albania) Tirana (1st)	(Azerbaijan) Neftçi (1st)

Notes

1. Kazakhstan (KAZ): 2003 Kazakhstan Premier League champions Irtysh failed to obtain UEFA licence, along with other Kazakhstani clubs.

== Round and draw dates ==
The schedule of the competition was as follows (all draws were held at UEFA headquarters in Nyon, Switzerland, unless stated otherwise).

Phase	Round	Draw date	First leg	Second leg
Qualifying	First qualifying round	25 June 2004	13–14 July 2004	21 July 2004
Qualifying	Second qualifying round	25 June 2004	27–28 July 2004	4 August 2004
Qualifying	Third qualifying round	30 July 2004	10–11 August 2004	24–25 August 2004
Group stage	Matchday 1	26 August 2004 (Monaco)	14–15 September 2004	
Group stage	Matchday 2	26 August 2004 (Monaco)	28–29 September 2004	
Group stage	Matchday 3	26 August 2004 (Monaco)	19–20 October 2004	
Group stage	Matchday 4	26 August 2004 (Monaco)	2–3 November 2004	
Group stage	Matchday 5	26 August 2004 (Monaco)	23–24 November 2004	
Group stage	Matchday 6	26 August 2004 (Monaco)	7–8 December 2004	
Knockout phase	Round of 16	17 December 2004	22–23 February 2005	8–9 March 2005 (Note: Internazionale home game in the Round of 16 was rescheduled to one week later (15 March 2005) due to venue clash with Milan.)
Knockout phase	Quarter-finals	18 March 2005	5–6 April 2005	12–13 April 2005
Knockout phase	Semi-finals	18 March 2005	26–27 April 2005	3–4 May 2005
Knockout phase	Final	18 March 2005	25 May 2005 at Atatürk Olympic Stadium, Istanbul	

== Qualifying rounds ==
=== Summary ===
Team 1	Agg.	Team 2	1st leg	2nd leg
KR (Iceland)	2–2 (a)	(Republic of Ireland) Shelbourne	2–2	0–0
Skonto (Latvia)	7–1	(Wales) Rhyl	4–0	3–1
Flora (Estonia)	3–7	(Slovenia) HIT Gorica	2–4	1–3
Linfield (Northern Ireland)	0–2	(Finland) HJK	0–1	0–1
Pobeda (North Macedonia)	2–4	(Armenia) Pyunik	1–3	1–1
Sheriff Tiraspol (Moldova)	2–1	(Luxembourg) Jeunesse Esch	2–0	0–1
WIT Georgia (Georgia (country))	5–3	(Faroe Islands) HB	5–0	0–3
Sliema Wanderers (Malta)	1–6	(Lithuania) Kaunas	0–2	1–4
Široki Brijeg (Bosnia and Herzegovina)	2–2 (a)	(Azerbaijan) Neftçi	2–1	0–1
Gomel (Belarus)	1–2	(Albania) Tirana	0–2	1–0

=== Summary ===
Team 1	Agg.	Team 2	1st leg	2nd leg
Pyunik (Armenia)	1–4	(Ukraine) Shakhtar Donetsk	1–3	0–1
APOEL (Cyprus)	3–4	(Czech Republic) Sparta Prague	2–2	1–2
Rosenborg (Norway)	4–1	(Moldova) Sheriff Tiraspol	2–1	2–0
Young Boys (Switzerland)	2–5	(Serbia and Montenegro) Red Star Belgrade	2–2	0–3
HIT Gorica (Slovenia)	6–2	(Denmark) Copenhagen	1–2	5–0
Neftçi (Azerbaijan)	0–2	(Russia) CSKA Moscow	0–0	0–2
Žilina (Slovakia)	0–2	(Romania) Dinamo București	0–1	0–1
HJK (Finland)	0–1	(Israel) Maccabi Tel Aviv	0–0	0–1
Skonto (Latvia)	1–4	(Turkey) Trabzonspor	1–1	0–3
Club Brugge (Belgium)	6–0	(Bulgaria) Lokomotiv Plovdiv	2–0	4–0
Tirana (Albania)	3–3 (a)	(Hungary) Ferencváros	2–3	1–0
Hajduk Split (Croatia)	3–4	(Republic of Ireland) Shelbourne	3–2	0–2
Djurgårdens IF (Sweden)	2–0	(Lithuania) Kaunas	0–0	2–0
WIT Georgia (Georgia (country))	2–11	(Poland) Wisła Kraków	2–8	0–3

=== Summary ===
Team 1	Agg.	Team 2	1st leg	2nd leg
GAK (Austria)	1–2	(England) Liverpool	0–2	1–0
Juventus (Italy)	6–3	(Sweden) Djurgårdens IF	2–2	4–1
Ferencváros (Hungary)	1–2	(Czech Republic) Sparta Prague	1–0	0–2 (a.e.t.)
Rosenborg (Norway)	5–3	(Israel) Maccabi Haifa	2–1	3–2 (a.e.t.)
Bayer Leverkusen (Germany)	6–2	(Czech Republic) Baník Ostrava	5–0	1–2
CSKA Moscow (Russia)	3–2	(Scotland) Rangers	2–1	1–1
Shakhtar Donetsk (Ukraine)	6–3	(Belgium) Club Brugge	4–1	2–2
Dynamo Kyiv (Ukraine)	3–2	(Turkey) Trabzonspor	1–2	2–0
Red Star Belgrade (Serbia and Montenegro)	3–7	(Netherlands) PSV Eindhoven	3–2	0–5
Dinamo București (Romania)	1–5	(England) Manchester United	1–2	0–3
Basel (Switzerland)	2–5	(Italy) Internazionale	1–1	1–4
Benfica (Portugal)	1–3	(Belgium) Anderlecht	1–0	0–3
Shelbourne (Republic of Ireland)	0–3	(Spain) Deportivo La Coruña	0–0	0–3
PAOK (Greece)	0–4	(Israel) Maccabi Tel Aviv	0–3 (Note: The first leg finished 2–1 to Maccabi Tel Aviv, but was awarded 3–0 against PAOK for fielding a suspended player.)	0–1
HIT Gorica (Slovenia)	0–9	(France) Monaco	0–3	0–6
Wisła Kraków (Poland)	1–5	(Spain) Real Madrid	0–2	1–3

== Group stage ==
Location of teams of the 2004–05 UEFA Champions League group stage.
Brown: Group A; Red: Group B; Orange: Group C; Yellow: Group D;
Green: Group E; Blue: Group F; Purple: Group G; Pink: Group H.

16 winners from the third qualifying round, 10 champions from countries ranked 1–10, and six second-placed teams from countries ranked 1–6 were drawn into eight groups of four teams each. The top two teams in each group will advance to the Champions League play-offs, while the third-placed teams will advance to the third round of the UEFA Cup.

Tiebreakers, if necessary, are applied in the following order:

1. Points earned in head-to-head matches between the tied teams.
2. Total goals scored in head-to-head matches between the tied teams.
3. Away goals scored in head-to-head matches between the tied teams.
4. Cumulative goal difference in all group matches.
5. Total goals scored in all group matches.
6. Higher UEFA coefficient going into the competition.

Maccabi Tel Aviv made their debut appearance in the group stage.

=== Group A ===
Pos	Team	Pld	W	D	L	GF	GA	GD	Pts	Qualification	MON	LIV	OLY	DEP
1	(France) Monaco	6	4	0	2	10	4	+6	12	Advance to knockout stage	—	1–0	2–1	2–0
2	(England) Liverpool	6	3	1	2	6	3	+3	10	Advance to knockout stage	2–0	—	3–1	0–0
3	(Greece) Olympiacos	6	3	1	2	5	5	0	10	Transfer to UEFA Cup	1–0	1–0	—	1–0
4	(Spain) Deportivo La Coruña	6	0	2	4	0	9	−9	2		0–5	0–1	0–0	—

=== Group B ===
Pos	Team	Pld	W	D	L	GF	GA	GD	Pts	Qualification	LEV	RMA	DKV	ROM
1	(Germany) Bayer Leverkusen	6	3	2	1	13	7	+6	11	Advance to knockout stage	—	3–0	3–0	3–1
2	(Spain) Real Madrid	6	3	2	1	11	8	+3	11	Advance to knockout stage	1–1	—	1–0	4–2
3	(Ukraine) Dynamo Kyiv	6	3	1	2	11	8	+3	10	Transfer to UEFA Cup	4–2	2–2	—	2–0
4	(Italy) Roma	6	0	1	5	4	16	−12	1		1–1	0–3	0–3 (Note: With Dynamo Kyiv leading 1–0, the match was abandoned at half-time after referee Anders Frisk was hit by an object thrown from the crowd. UEFA awarded Dynamo Kyiv a 3–0 win and ordered Roma to play their next two European games behind closed doors.)	—

=== Group C ===
Pos	Team	Pld	W	D	L	GF	GA	GD	Pts	Qualification	JUV	BAY	AJX	MTA
1	(Italy) Juventus	6	5	1	0	6	1	+5	16	Advance to knockout stage	—	1–0	1–0	1–0
2	(Germany) Bayern Munich	6	3	1	2	12	5	+7	10	Advance to knockout stage	0–1	—	4–0	5–1
3	(Netherlands) Ajax	6	1	1	4	6	10	−4	4	Transfer to UEFA Cup	0–1	2–2	—	3–0
4	(Israel) Maccabi Tel Aviv	6	1	1	4	4	12	−8	4		1–1	0–1	2–1	—

=== Group D ===
Pos	Team	Pld	W	D	L	GF	GA	GD	Pts	Qualification	LYO	MUN	FEN	SPP
1	(France) Lyon	6	4	1	1	17	8	+9	13	Advance to knockout stage	—	2–2	4–2	5–0
2	(England) Manchester United	6	3	2	1	14	9	+5	11	Advance to knockout stage	2–1	—	6–2	4–1
3	(Turkey) Fenerbahçe	6	3	0	3	10	13	−3	9	Transfer to UEFA Cup	1–3	3–0	—	1–0
4	(Czech Republic) Sparta Prague	6	0	1	5	2	13	−11	1		1–2	0–0	0–1	—

=== Group E ===
Pos	Team	Pld	W	D	L	GF	GA	GD	Pts	Qualification	ARS	PSV	PAN	ROS
1	(England) Arsenal	6	2	4	0	11	6	+5	10	Advance to knockout stage	—	1–0	1–1	5–1
2	(Netherlands) PSV Eindhoven	6	3	1	2	6	7	−1	10	Advance to knockout stage	1–1	—	1–0	1–0
3	(Greece) Panathinaikos	6	2	3	1	11	8	+3	9	Transfer to UEFA Cup	2–2	4–1	—	2–1
4	(Norway) Rosenborg	6	0	2	4	6	13	−7	2		1–1	1–2	2–2	—

=== Group F ===
Pos	Team	Pld	W	D	L	GF	GA	GD	Pts	Qualification	MIL	BAR	SHK	CEL
1	(Italy) Milan	6	4	1	1	10	3	+7	13	Advance to knockout stage	—	1–0	4–0	3–1
2	(Spain) Barcelona	6	3	1	2	9	6	+3	10	Advance to knockout stage	2–1	—	3–0	1–1
3	(Ukraine) Shakhtar Donetsk	6	2	0	4	5	9	−4	6	Transfer to UEFA Cup	0–1	2–0	—	3–0
4	(Scotland) Celtic	6	1	2	3	4	10	−6	5		0–0	1–3	1–0	—

=== Group G ===
Pos	Team	Pld	W	D	L	GF	GA	GD	Pts	Qualification	INT	BRM	VAL	AND
1	(Italy) Internazionale	6	4	2	0	14	3	+11	14	Advance to knockout stage	—	2–0	0–0	3–0
2	(Germany) Werder Bremen	6	4	1	1	12	6	+6	13	Advance to knockout stage	1–1	—	2–1	5–1
3	(Spain) Valencia	6	2	1	3	6	10	−4	7	Transfer to UEFA Cup	1–5	0–2	—	2–0
4	(Belgium) Anderlecht	6	0	0	6	4	17	−13	0		1–3	1–2	1–2	—

=== Group H ===
Pos	Team	Pld	W	D	L	GF	GA	GD	Pts	Qualification	CHE	POR	CSKA	PAR
1	(England) Chelsea	6	4	1	1	10	3	+7	13	Advance to knockout stage	—	3–1	2–0	0–0
2	(Portugal) Porto	6	2	2	2	4	6	−2	8	Advance to knockout stage	2–1	—	0–0	0–0
3	(Russia) CSKA Moscow	6	2	1	3	5	5	0	7	Transfer to UEFA Cup	0–1	0–1	—	2–0
4	(France) Paris Saint-Germain	6	1	2	3	3	8	−5	5		0–3	2–0	1–3	—

== Knockout phase ==
=== Bracket ===
Round of 16
(England) Manchester United	0	0	0
(Italy) Milan	1	1	2
(Portugal) Porto	1	1	2
(Italy) Internazionale	1	3	4
(Germany) Werder Bremen	0	2	2
(France) Lyon	3	7	10
(Netherlands) PSV Eindhoven	1	2	3
(France) Monaco	0	0	0
(Spain) Barcelona	2	2	4
(England) Chelsea	1	4	5
(Germany) Bayern Munich	3	0	3
(England) Arsenal	1	1	2
(England) Liverpool	3	3	6
(Germany) Bayer Leverkusen	1	1	2
(Spain) Real Madrid	1	0	1
(Italy) Juventus (a.e.t.)	0	2	2

Quarter-finals
(Italy) Milan	2	3	5
(Italy) Internazionale	0	0	0
(France) Lyon	1	1	2 (2)
(Netherlands) PSV Eindhoven (p)	1	1	2 (4)
(England) Chelsea	4	2	6
(Germany) Bayern Munich	2	3	5
(England) Liverpool	2	0	2
(Italy) Juventus	1	0	1

Semi-finals
(Italy) Milan (a)	2	1	3
(Netherlands) PSV Eindhoven	0	3	3
(England) Chelsea	0	0	0
(England) Liverpool	0	1	1

Final
25 May – Istanbul
(Italy) Milan	3 (2)
(England) Liverpool (p)	3 (3)

=== Round of 16 ===
Team 1	Agg.	Team 2	1st leg	2nd leg
Real Madrid (Spain)	1–2	(Italy) Juventus	1–0	0–2 (a.e.t.)
Liverpool (England)	6–2	(Germany) Bayer Leverkusen	3–1	3–1
PSV Eindhoven (Netherlands)	3–0	(France) Monaco	1–0	2–0
Bayern Munich (Germany)	3–2	(England) Arsenal	3–1	0–1
Barcelona (Spain)	4–5	(England) Chelsea	2–1	2–4
Manchester United (England)	0–2	(Italy) Milan	0–1	0–1
Werder Bremen (Germany)	2–10	(France) Lyon	0–3	2–7
Porto (Portugal)	2–4	(Italy) Internazionale	1–1	1–3

=== Quarter-finals ===
Team 1	Agg.	Team 2	1st leg	2nd leg
Liverpool (England)	2–1	(Italy) Juventus	2–1	0–0
Lyon (France)	2–2 (2–4 p)	(Netherlands) PSV Eindhoven	1–1	1–1 (a.e.t.)
Chelsea (England)	6–5	(Germany) Bayern Munich	4–2	2–3
Milan (Italy)	5–0	(Italy) Internazionale	2–0	3–0 (Note: Match was abandoned after 72 minutes as Milan led 1–0 due to flares thrown onto the pitch by Internazionale fans, one of which struck Milan goalkeeper Dida. UEFA awarded Milan a 3–0 win (5–0 aggregate) and ordered Internazionale to play their next four European games behind closed doors.)

=== Semi-finals ===
Team 1	Agg.	Team 2	1st leg	2nd leg
Chelsea (England)	0–1	(England) Liverpool	0–0	0–1
Milan (Italy)	3–3 (a)	(Netherlands) PSV Eindhoven	2–0	1–3

=== Final ===
The final was played on 25 May 2005 at the Atatürk Olympic Stadium in Istanbul, Turkey.

25 May 2005
21:45 UTC+3

Milan (Italy)	3–3 (a.e.t.)	(England) Liverpool
Maldini 1'; Crespo 39', 44'	Report	Gerrard 54'; Šmicer 56'; Alonso 60'
Penalties
Serginho (penalty missed); Pirlo (penalty missed); Tomasson (penalty scored); Kaká (penalty scored); Shevchenko (penalty missed)	2–3	(penalty scored) Hamann; (penalty scored) Cissé; (penalty missed) Riise; (penalty scored) Šmicer

Atatürk Olympic Stadium, Istanbul
Attendance: 69,000
Referee: Manuel Mejuto González (Spain)

== Statistics ==
Statistics exclude qualifying rounds.

=== Top goalscorers ===
Rank	Player	Team	Goals	Minutes played
1	(Netherlands) Ruud van Nistelrooy	(England) Manchester United	8	528
2	(Brazil) Adriano	(Italy) Internazionale	7	548
2	(Netherlands) Roy Makaay	(Germany) Bayern Munich	7	702
4	(France) Sylvain Wiltord	(France) Lyon	6	606
4	(Argentina) Hernán Crespo	(Italy) Milan	6	612
4	(Ukraine) Andriy Shevchenko	(Italy) Milan	6	869
7	(Croatia) Ivan Klasnić	(Germany) Werder Bremen	5	431
7	(Nigeria) Obafemi Martins	(Italy) Internazionale	5	510
7	(Turkey) Tuncay	(Turkey) Fenerbahçe	5	525
7	(Ivory Coast) Didier Drogba	(England) Chelsea	5	688
7	(France) Thierry Henry	(England) Arsenal	5	720
7	(Ghana) Michael Essien	(France) Lyon	5	930
7	(Spain) Luis García	(England) Liverpool	5	972

=== Squad of the season ===
UEFA's Technical Study Group selected the following 21 players for the 2004–05 UEFA Champions League Team of the Tournament.

Pos.	Player	Team
GK	(Italy) Gianluigi Buffon	(Italy) Juventus
GK	(Czech Republic) Petr Čech	(England) Chelsea
GK	(Poland) Jerzy Dudek	(England) Liverpool
DF	(England) Jamie Carragher	(England) Liverpool
DF	(England) John Terry	(England) Chelsea
DF	(Italy) Paolo Maldini	(Italy) AC Milan
DF	(Finland) Sami Hyypiä	(England) Liverpool
DF	(Italy) Alessandro Nesta	(Italy) AC Milan
DF	(Brazil) Cafu	(Italy) AC Milan
MF	(Brazil) Kaká	(Italy) AC Milan
MF	(Netherlands) Mark van Bommel	(Netherlands) PSV Eindhoven
MF	(Germany) Michael Ballack	(Germany) Bayern Munich
MF	(England) Steven Gerrard	(England) Liverpool
MF	(Italy) Andrea Pirlo	(Italy) AC Milan
MF	(Brazil) Juninho Pernambucano	(France) Lyon
MF	(England) Frank Lampard	(England) Chelsea
FW	(Brazil) Ronaldinho	(Spain) Barcelona
FW	(Cameroon) Samuel Eto'o	(Spain) Barcelona
FW	(Brazil) Adriano	(Italy) Inter Milan
FW	(Ukraine) Andriy Shevchenko	(Italy) AC Milan
FW	(South Korea) Park Ji-sung	(Netherlands) PSV Eindhoven

== See also ==
- 2004–05 UEFA Cup
- 2005 UEFA Super Cup
- 2005 FIFA Club World Championship
- 2004–05 UEFA Women's Cup
