= Sylvain Idangar =

Chadian footballer (born 1984)

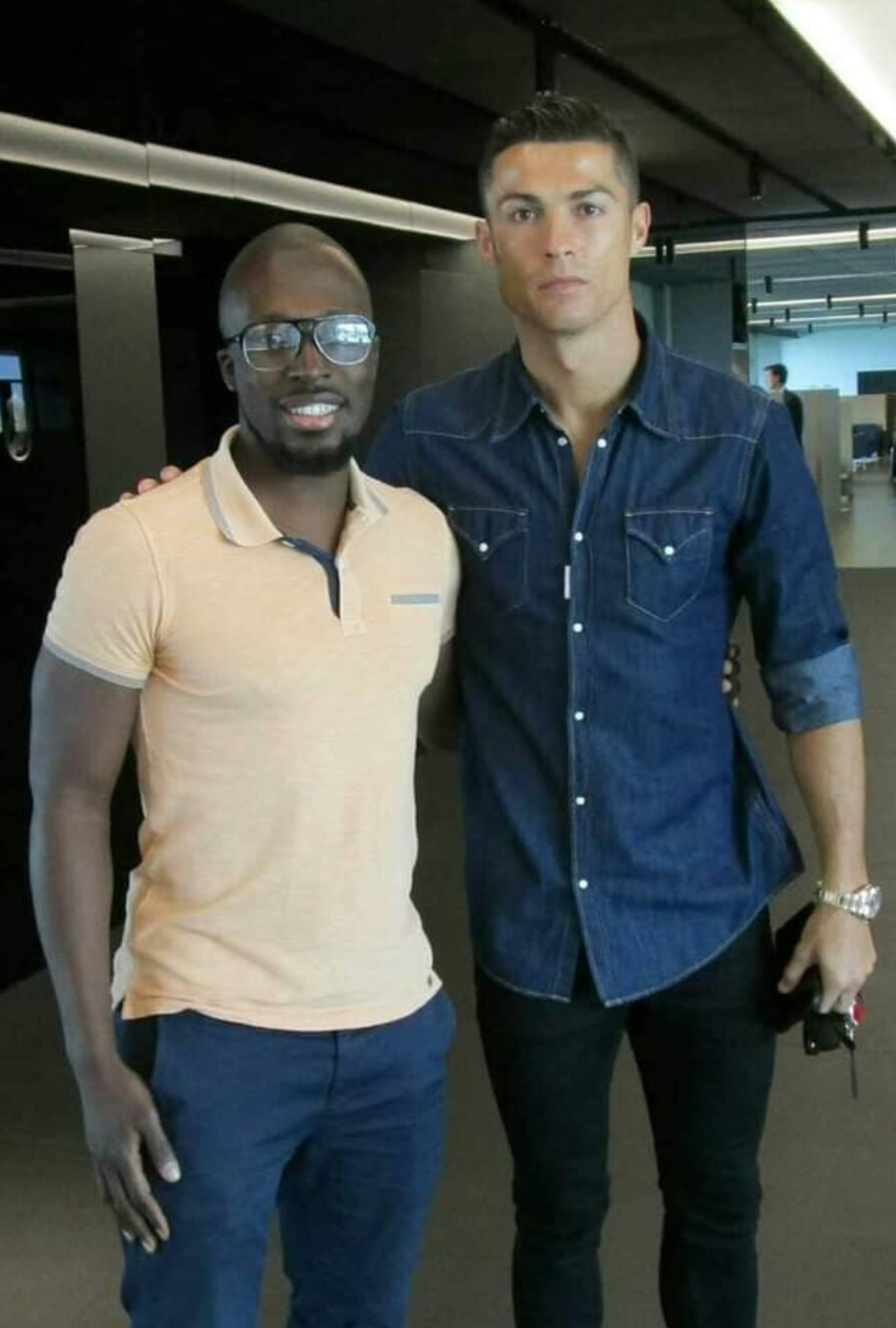
- Idangar with Cristiano Ronaldo

Personal information
- Full name: Sylvain Idangar Nguetoinar
- Date of birth: 8 March 1984 (age 42)
- Place of birth: Paris, France
- Height: 1.75 m (5 ft 9 in)
- Position: Midfielder

Senior career*
Years	Team	Apps	(Gls)
2004–2007	Lyon	0	(0)
2004–2007	Lyon B	85	(10)
2005–2006	→ Valenciennes (loan)	5	(0)
2007–2008	Al-Watani		(2)
2008–2009	ES Sétif	2	(0)
2009	SO Cassis Carnoux	12	(2)
2010	Feirense	7	(0)
2011	Bangkok Glass	0	(0)
2012	Vénissieux	10	(1)
2013–2014	Limonest		
2014	Lyon-Duchère	4	(0)
2015	FC Bords De Saône		
2016–2018	Limonest		
2018–2021	Vénissieux		

International career
2002–2003	France U19		
2014	Chad	1	(0)
- * Club domestic league appearances and goals

Sylvain Idangar Nguetoinar (born 8 March 1984) is a former professional footballer who played as a midfielder. Born in France, he represented the Chad national team.

== Career ==
Idingar played one game for Lyon in the UEFA Champions League on 8 December 2004 scoring the fourth goal in a 5–0 win against Sparta Prague.

In June 2005 Indingar moved on loan to Valenciennes where he played five games in Ligue 2 before going back to Lyon. In June 2007 he left Lyon and moved to Al-Watani. He moved again in 2008 move to ES Sétif.

Idangar had a brief spell with Feirense in Portugal's LigaPro.

After several years playing abroad, Idangar returned to the Lyon metropolitan area, where he played with amateurs Venissieux, Lyon-Duchère and FC Bords de Saône. With Venissieux he reached the round of 16 in the 2012–13 Coupe de France. In January 2021, he was playing for the club while coaching its under-14 team. By November, he had retired from playing.

== Personal life ==
Idangar was a roommate of France international footballer Hatem Ben Arfa during his spell at SO Cassis Carnoux, while Ben Arfa was playing for neighboring club Marseille. They first met as youth players at Lyon, and are now best friends.

Idangar released an autobiographical novel entitled La valeur de l'échec (The value of failure) in 2020.

== See also ==
- List of Chad international footballers
