= Baruch Dego =

Israeli footballer

Baruch Dego ברוך דגו
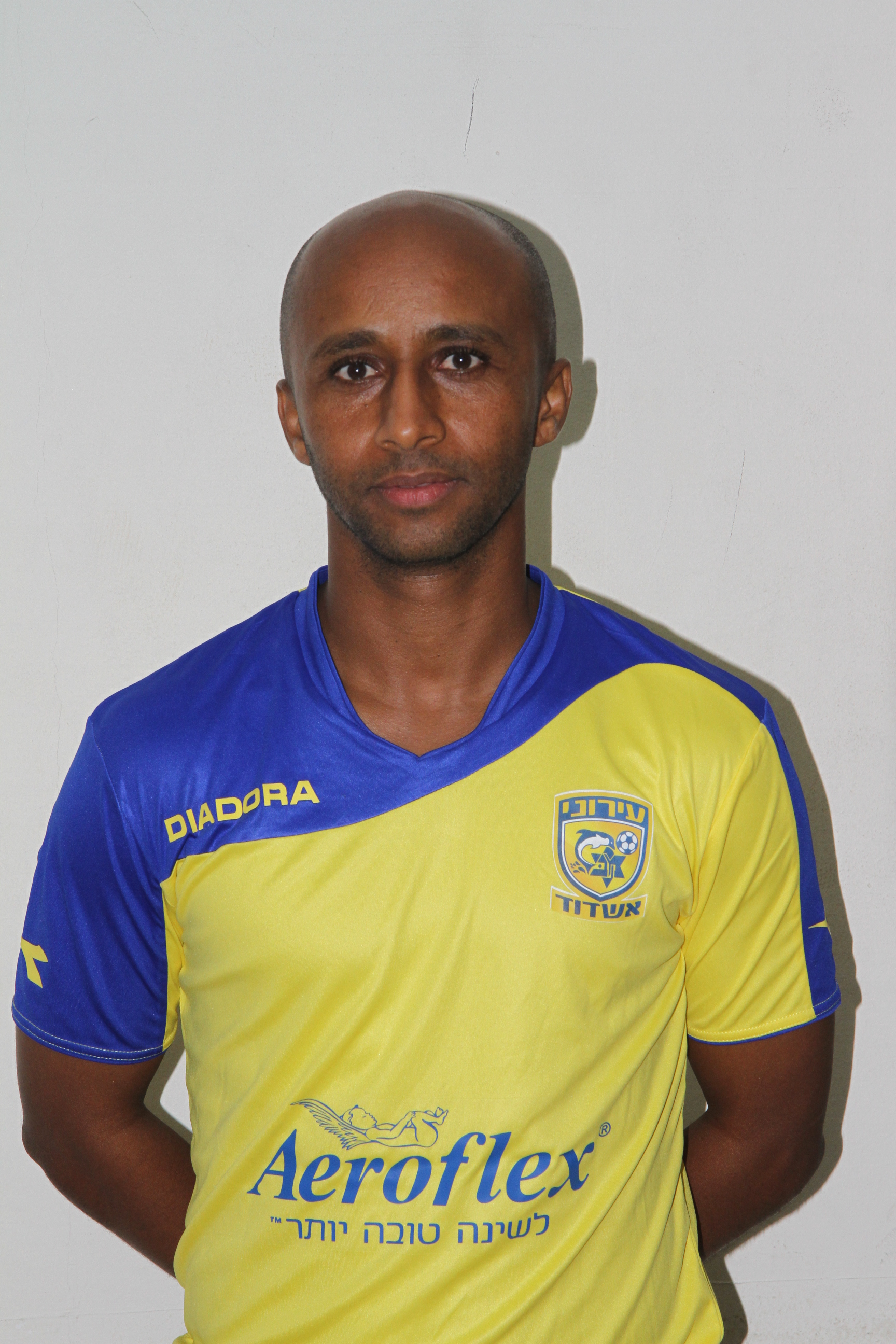

Personal information
- Date of birth: 28 March 1982 (age 44)
- Place of birth: Addis Ababa, Ethiopia
- Height: 1.69 m (5 ft 6 1/2 in)
- Position: Right winger

Youth career
- Maccabi Ironi Ashdod

Senior career*
Years	Team	Apps	(Gls)
1998–1999	Maccabi Ironi Ashdod	24	(3)
1999–2000	F.C. Ashdod	41	(9)
2000–2005	Maccabi Tel Aviv	137	(26)
2005–2008	Hapoel Tel Aviv	90	(11)
2008	Maccabi Netanya	1	(0)
2008–2010	F.C. Ashdod	36	(1)
2010	Nea Salamis Famagusta	7	(0)
2010–2011	Apollon Limassol	5	(0)
2011–2013	Ironi Ramat HaSharon	43	(6)
2013	Hapoel Rishon LeZion	11	(1)
2013–2017	Hapoel Ashkelon	97	(9)
2017–2019	Maccabi Ironi Ashdod	58	(15)

International career
1999–2002	Israel U-21	12	(2)
2003	Israel	2	(0)

Managerial career
- 2023–: Maccabi Ironi Ashdod (caretaker manager)
- * Club domestic league appearances and goals

Baruch Dego (or Barukh, Hebrew: ברוך דגו; born 28 March 1982) is an Ethiopian-born Israeli former association footballer, who played for the Israel national team.

== Early life ==
Dego was born in Addis Ababa, Ethiopia, to an Ethiopian-Jewish family. He immigrated to Israel in the 1990s, with his parents and younger brothers. His younger brother Messay Dego is also a former association footballer, who played for the Israel U21 national team, and is currently the manager of Maccabi Haifa.

== Sports career ==
Dego initially played for Maccabi Ironi Ashdod In 2000-2001 he was transferred to Maccabi Tel Aviv, winning the championship and three national trophies. In 2004/05, he was the only player to score for Maccabi in the UEFA Champions League group stage. He scored two goals against Ajax Amsterdam in the local win 2–1, one goal from penalty against Juventus (1–1) and another penalty goal at Bayern Munich (5–1 to Bayern).

After spending 3 seasons with Hapoel Tel Aviv winning two more Israeli State Cup he moved to Maccabi Natanya which was coached by Lothar Matthäus He played one official match before being released and signing a two-year contract with F.C. Ashdod. He reunited with his former coach Nir Klinger at Nea Salamis Famagusta FC.

On 28 May Apollon Limassol announced that Dego signed a two-year contract with the club. Dego reunited with his former Maccabi Tel Aviv attack partner Aldo Adorno with whom he played with during the 2003–2004 season.

On 6 July 2011, he joined Ironi Ramat HaSharon. He was released in the middle of the 2012–13 season, and signed a contract to play for Hapoel Rishon LeZion of Israel's second league until the end of the season, with the hope of helping them to move up a league to Israel's top league for the next season.

== Honours ==
=== Club ===
Maccabi Tel-Aviv

- Israeli Premier League (1): 2002–03
- Israel State Cup (2): 2001, 2002

Hapoel Tel-aviv

- Israel State Cup (3): 2005, 2006, 2007

=== Individual ===
- Footballer of the Year in Israel (1): 2003
