= Frank De Bleeckere =

Belgian football referee

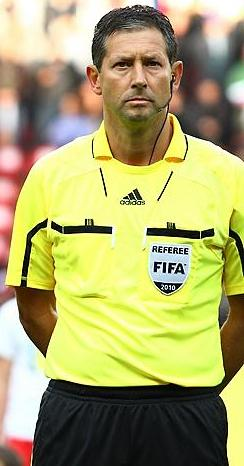
- Full name: Frank Wermer De Bleeckere
- Born: 1 July 1966 (age 60); Oudenaarde, Belgium

Domestic
Years	League	Role
1994–2012	Jupiler League	Referee

International
Years	League	Role
1998–2012	FIFA listed	Referee

Frank De Bleeckere (Dutch pronunciation: [ˈfrɑŋɡ də ˈbleːkərə]; (Note: In isolation, Frank is pronounced [frɑŋk].) born 1 July 1966) is a Belgian former football referee. He had been a referee since 1984, and an international (FIFA) official since 1998. De Bleeckere refereed in his first World Cup finals in Germany, and had to pass a late fitness test following injury. He had been appointed by UEFA as one of twelve referees to officiate UEFA Euro 2008 matches, and was in charge of the semi-final between Spain and Russia.

== Career highlights ==
=== International appointments ===
De Bleeckere made his international refereeing debut on 24 March 2001 in a FIFA World Cup 2002 Qualifier between Cyprus and the Republic of Ireland.

In 2005, he oversaw the FIFA U-17 World Championship final between Mexico and Brazil. De Bleeckere also refereed four other games in the tournament, prior to the final.

One year later, in 2006, he was in charge of the 2006 FIFA World Cup qualifier between Turkey and Switzerland.

=== UEFA Champions League ===
In 2005, De Bleeckere was in charge of the UEFA Champions League quarter-final match between Liverpool and Juventus.

During the UEFA Champions League 2006-07 group stage, De Bleeckere was chosen for the match between Chelsea and Barcelona.

Later in the tournament, De Bleeckere was appointed by UEFA to referee the semi-final between Milan and Manchester United on 2 May 2007.

In the 2007–08 tournament, he was assigned the first knockout round first leg game between Liverpool and Internazionale. He sent off Inter defender Marco Materazzi for two yellow card offences after 30 minutes, leaving Inter to play with 10 men for the rest of the match. Next, he was appointed for the quarter-final clash between Roma and Manchester United.

In 2008–09, De Bleeckere took charge of the Group E match between Manchester United and Celtic at Old Trafford on 21 October 2008.

In 2009–10, De Bleeckere took charge of the semi-final match between Barcelona and Inter on 28 April 2010. He was involved in a couple of controversial decisions. He gave Inter midfielder Thiago Motta a red card for an offense on Sergio Busquets.

In 2010–11, De Bleeckere was in charge of the second leg of the 2010–11 semi-final match between FC Barcelona and Real Madrid C.F.

=== 2009 UEFA Super Cup ===
On 28 August 2009, De Bleeckere took charge of the UEFA Super Cup match between the UEFA Champions League winners FC Barcelona and the last UEFA Cup winners FC Shakhtar Donetsk at the Stade Louis II in Monaco.

== 2006 FIFA World Cup ==
=== Group C: Argentina vs Ivory Coast ===
De Bleeckere issued five yellows during this match, including Arsenal defender Emmanuel Eboué and Manchester United defender Gabriel Heinze.

=== Group F: Croatia vs Japan ===
De Bleeckere showed five yellows again, including cards given to Japanese goalkeeper Yoshikatsu Kawaguchi and Croatian defender Darijo Srna. Also he awarded a penalty to Croatia.

=== Second round: England vs Ecuador ===
Paul Robinson and Jamie Carragher were booked for time wasting, and John Terry for dangerous play. For Ecuador, three players made their way into the referee's book.

=== Quarterfinal: Italy vs Ukraine ===
De Bleeckere refereed the match between Italy and Ukraine and had few troubles on the pitch, the match featured very few harsh tackles and De Bleeckere only had to hand out three yellow cards.

== 2010 FIFA World Cup ==
He was preselected as a referee for the 2010 FIFA World Cup. He showed a second yellow and inevitably a red card to Loukas Vyntra on the 43rd minute during Switzerland - Greece game that was held on 5 September 2009.

He officiated the match between the United States and Algeria on 23 June.

== International career ==
2002 FIFA World Cup qualification

- Cyprus 0 Republic of Ireland 4, March 2001
- Moldova 0 Turkey 0, October 2001

UEFA Euro 2004 qualification

- Latvia 0 Sweden 0, September 2002
- Greece 1 Ukraine 0, June 2003
- Macedonia 1 England 2, September 2003

2003 FIFA World Youth Championship

- UAE 1 Slovakia 4, November 2003
- Japan 1 England 0, November 2003
- Colombia 0 Egypt 0, November 2003
- Panama 1 UAE 2, December 2003
- Argentina 3 Mali 1, December 2003
- Republic of Ireland 2 Colombia 2, December 2003
- Spain 1 Colombia 0, December 2003
- Colombia 2 Argentina 1, December 2003

UEFA Euro 2004

- Denmark 0 Italy 0, June 2004
- Russia 0 Portugal 2, June 2004
- Russia 2 Greece 1, June 2004

2006 FIFA World Cup qualification

- Slovenia 1 Italy 0, October 2004
- Armenia 1 Romania 1, November 2004
- Korea DPR 0 Japan 2, June 2005
- Estonia 0 Portugal 1, June 2005
- Sweden 3 Bulgaria 0, September 2005
- Denmark 1 Greece 0, October 2005
- Turkey 4 Switzerland 2, November 2005

2005 FIFA U-17 World Championship

- Peru 1 Ghana 1, September 2005
- Ivory Coast 0 North Korea 3, September 2005
- Qatar 0 Brazil 6, September 2005
- Turkey 3 Brazil 4, September 2005
- Mexico 3 Brazil 0, October 2005

FIFA World Cup 2006

- Argentina 2 Ivory Coast 1, June 2006
- Croatia 0 Japan 0, June 2006
- England 1 Ecuador 0, June 2006
- Italy 3 Ukraine 0, June 2006

UEFA Euro 2008 qualification

- Northern Ireland 3 Spain 2, September 2006

UEFA Euro 2008

- Croatia 2 Germany 1, June 2008
- Sweden 0 Russia 2, June 2008
- Russia 0 Spain 3, June 2008

Friendlies

- Portugal 1 Finland 4, March 2002
- Germany 1 Serbia and Montenegro 0, April 2003

2009 FIFA U-20 World Cup

- Egypt 4 Trinidad and Tobago 1, September 2009 Opening Match
- Nigeria 0 Spain 2, September 2009
- Australia 1 Brazil 3, October 2009
- Ghana – Brazil: October 2009 final

== Statistics ==
Event	Games	Yellow card	(yellow card) (yellow card) (red card)	Red card
2006 FIFA World Cup	4	19	0	0
UEFA Euro 2008	3	13	0	1
2010 FIFA World Cup	3	15	1	0
UEFA Champions League	47	164	-	7
