= 2002–03 Piacenza Calcio season =

Piacenza
2002–03 season
- Manager: Andrea Agostinelli; Luigi Cagni
- Serie A: 16th
- Coppa Italia: Round of 16
- Top goalscorer: Dario Hübner (14)

Piacenza Calcio were relegated in the second season in the top echelon of Italian football. Coach Andrea Agostinelli was soon sacked, but Luigi Cagni could not save Piacenza from going down.

== Squad ==
=== Goalkeepers ===
- (Italy) Matteo Guardalben
- (Italy) Paolo Orlandoni
- (Italy) Maurizio Franzone

=== Defenders ===
- (Italy) Matteo Abbate
- (Italy) Nicola Boselli
- (Argentina) (Italy) Hugo Campagnaro
- (Italy) Giuseppe Cardone
- (Italy) Filippo Cristante
- (Belarus) Sergei Gurenko
- (Italy) Gianluca Lamacchi
- (Italy) Amedeo Mangone
- (Italy) Alessandro Rinaldi
- (Italy) Vittorio Tosto
- (Italy) Paolo Tramezzani

=== Midfielders ===
- (Italy) Davide Baiocco
- (Italy) Sandro Cois
- (Italy) Eusebio Di Francesco
- (Italy) Claudio Ferrarese
- (Italy) Marco Marchionni
- (Italy) Dario Marcolin
- (Italy) Enzo Maresca
- (Italy) Salvatore Miceli
- (Romania) Bogdan Pătraşcu
- (Italy) Luigi Riccio
- (Italy) Marco Stella

=== Attackers ===
- (Nigeria) Ibrahim Babatunde
- (Italy) Nicola Caccia
- (Italy) Ciro De Cesare
- (Italy) Dario Hübner
- (Colombia) Johnnier Montaño
- (Argentina) (Italy) Iván Obolo
- (Italy) Francesco Zerbini

== Serie A ==
Pos	Team	Pld	W	D	L	GF	GA	GD	Pts	Qualification or relegation
14	Reggina	34	10	8	16	38	53	−15	38 (Note: Modena finished ahead of Empoli, Atalanta and Reggina on head-to-head points: Modena: 10 pts, Empoli: 9 pts, Atalanta: 7 pts, Reggina: 5 pts.)	Relegation tie-breaker
15	Atalanta (R)	34	8	14	12	35	47	−12	38	Serie B after tie-breaker (Note: Atalanta to 2003–04 Serie B after tie-breaker.)
16	Piacenza (R)	34	8	6	20	44	62	−18	30	Relegation to Serie B
17	Como (R)	34	4	12	18	29	57	−28	24	Relegation to Serie B
18	Torino (R)	34	4	9	21	23	58	−35	21	Relegation to Serie B

Source: 2002–03 Serie A, Soccerway
Rules for classification: 1) Points; 2) Head-to-head points; 3) Head-to-head goal difference; 4) Goal difference; 5) Goals scored; 6) Draw. (Note: Head-to-head record is used only after all the matches between the teams in question have been played).
(R) Relegated

=== Matches ===
Kick-off times are CET

Manager: Andrea Agostinelli

15 September 2002 1	Brescia	1–2	Piacenza	Brescia
20:30	Bachini 69'		Montaño 72'; Hübner 79'	Stadium: Stadio Mario Rigamonti; Attendance: 17,284; Referee: Nicola Ayroldi

22 September 2002 2	Piacenza	2–0	Udinese	Piacenza
15:00	Hübner 26'; Maresca 88'			Stadium: Stadio Leonardo Garilli; Attendance: 6,976; Referee: Emilio Pellegrino

29 September 2002 3	Bologna	1–0	Piacenza	Bologna
15:00	Della Rocca 65'			Stadium: Stadio Renato Dall'Ara; Attendance: 20,548; Referee: Massimo De Santis

6 October 2002 4	Piacenza	1–4	Inter	Piacenza
15:00	Maresca 73'		Di Biagio 36', 51'; Recoba 69'; Crespo 85'	Stadium: Stadio Leonardo Garilli; Referee: Gianluca Paparesta

20 October 2002 5	Como	1–1	Piacenza	Como
15:00	Cardone 45' (o.g.)		Caccia 30'	Stadium: Stadio Giuseppe Sinigaglia; Referee: Antonio Dattilo

27 October 2002 6	Piacenza	1–2	Empoli	Piacenza
15:00	Cardone 6'		Rocchi 30'; Vannucchi 81'	Stadium: Stadio Leonardo Garilli; Referee: Danilo Nucini

3 November 2002 7	Atalanta	2–0	Piacenza	Bergamo
15:00	Sala 78'; Comandini 88'			Stadium: Stadio Atleti Azzurri d'Italia; Attendance: 13,514; Referee: Cosimo Bolognino

6 November 2002 8	Piacenza	0–1	Juventus	Piacenza
20:30			Nedvěd 70'	Stadium: Stadio Leonardo Garilli; Referee: Matteo Trefoloni

9 November 2002 9	Piacenza	1–1	Roma	Piacenza
20:30	Maresca 74'		Cassano 27'	Stadium: Stadio Leonardo Garilli

17 November 2002 10	Modena	1–0	Piacenza	Modena
15:00	Milanetto 33' (pen.)			Stadium: Stadio Alberto Braglia

24 November 2002 11	Piacenza	1–0	Torino	Piacenza
15:00	Di Francesco 23'			Stadium: Stadio Leonardo Garilli

1 December 2002 12	Piacenza	2–3	Lazio	Piacenza
15:00	Maresca 17'; Caccia 26'		Simeone 42'; C. López 45'; Corradi 90+1'	Stadium: Stadio Leonardo Garilli

8 December 2002 13	Perugia	0–0	Piacenza	Perugia
15:00				Stadium: Stadio Renato Curi

14 December 2002 14	Piacenza	0–3	Chievo	Piacenza
18:00			Della Morte 49'; Bierhoff 87'; Pellissier 90+1'	Stadium: Stadio Leonardo Garilli; Attendance: 6,139

22 December 2002 15	Reggina	3–1	Piacenza	Reggio Calabria
15:00	Savoldi 49', 64'; Di Michele 77' (pen.)		Boselli 13'	Stadium: Stadio Oreste Granillo

12 January 2003 16	Piacenza	1–1	Parma	Piacenza
15:00	Tosto 46'		Mutu 28'	Stadium: Stadio Leonardo Garilli

19 January 2003 17	Milan	2–1	Piacenza	Milan
15:00	Pirlo 54' (pen.); Rivaldo 69'		Gurenko 52'	Stadium: Stadio San Siro

26 January 2003 18	Juventus	2–0	Piacenza	Turin
15:00	Del Piero 9'; Nedvěd 43'			Stadium: Stadio Delle Alpi

1 February 2003 19	Piacenza	1–4	Brescia	Piacenza
18:00	Hübner 17'		Appiah 7'; R. Baggio 32'; Toni 47'; Tare 87'	Stadium: Stadio Leonardo Garilli; Attendance: 7,705

Manager: Luigi Cagni

8 February 2003 20	Udinese	2–1	Piacenza	Udine
18:00	Jankulovski 18'; Muzzi 84'		Hübner 77'	Stadium: Stadio Friuli; Attendance: 14,327

16 February 2003 21	Piacenza	3–1	Bologna	Piacenza
15:00	Hübner 19' (pen.); Maresca 40'; De Cesare 62'		Bellucci 84'	Stadium: Stadio Leonardo Garilli; Attendance: 6,434

23 February 2003 22	Inter	3–1	Piacenza	Milan
15:00	Batistuta 64'; Vieri 65', 67'		Hübner 90'	Stadium: Stadio San Siro

2 March 2003 23	Piacenza	0–1	Como	Piacenza
15:00			Amoruso 7'	Stadium: Stadio Leonardo Garilli

9 March 2003 24	Empoli	3–1	Piacenza	Empoli
15:00	Grella 56'; Tavano 68'; Borriello 81'		Hübner 90'	Stadium: Stadio Carlo Castellani

16 March 2003 25	Piacenza	2–0	Atalanta	Piacenza
15:00	Hübner 41'; De Cesare 89'			Stadium: Stadio Leonardo Garilli; Attendance: 8,977

23 March 2003 26	Roma	3–0	Piacenza	Rome
15:00	Cassano 11'; Delvecchio 30'; Totti 43'			Stadium: Stadio Olimpico

6 April 2003 27	Piacenza	3–3	Modena	Piacenza
15:00	Di Francesco 8', 66'; Maresca 90+1'		Milanetto 24' (pen.), 26' (pen.); Vignaroli 85'	Stadium: Stadio Leonardo Garilli

13 April 2003 28	Torino	1–3	Piacenza	Parma
15:00	Conticchio 58'		Maresca 60'; Di Francesco 83'; Ferrarese 90+1'	Stadium: Stadio Ennio Tardini

19 April 2003 29	Lazio	2–1	Piacenza	Rome
15:00	S. Inzaghi 60'; Corradi 74'		De Cesare 45'	Stadium: Stadio Olimpico

27 April 2003 30	Piacenza	5–1	Perugia	Piacenza
15:00	Di Francesco 5'; Campagnaro 36', 63'; Hübner 41'; Ferrarese 80'		Zé Maria 50'	Stadium: Stadio Leonardo Garilli

3 May 2003 31	Chievo	3–1	Piacenza	Verona
15:00	De Franceschi 65', 69'; Bjelanović 80'		Di Francesco 47'	Stadium: Stadio Marcantonio Bentegodi; Attendance: 11,418

10 May 2003 32	Piacenza	2–2	Reggina	Piacenza
15:00	Hübner 72', 75'		Di Michele 68'; Mozart 77'	Stadium: Stadio Leonardo Garilli

17 May 2003 33	Parma	3–2	Piacenza	Parma
15:00	Gilardino 67'; Adriano 71'; Mutu 89'		Maresca 33'; Hübner 40'	Stadium: Stadio Ennio Tardini

24 May 2003 34	Piacenza	4–2	Milan	Piacenza
15:00	Hübner 6', 82'; Maresca 17' (pen.); Marchionni 31'		Brocchi 30' (pen.), 90+2'	Stadium: Stadio Leonardo Garilli

=== Top Scorers ===
- (Italy) Dario Hübner 14 (1)
- (Italy) Enzo Maresca 9 (1)
- (Italy) Eusebio Di Francesco 6
- (Italy) Ciro De Cesare 3
