= 2001–02 Reggina Calcio season =

Reggina
2001–02 season
- Chairman: Pasquale Foti
- Manager: Franco Colomba
- Serie B: 3rd
- Coppa Italia: Group Phase
- Top goalscorer: Gianluca Savoldi (15)
- Average home league attendance: 16,779

Reggina Calcio was re-promoted to Serie A, following a reliable performance in the 2001–02 Serie B, following its narrow relegation from the top tier. With Gianluca Savoldi and Davide Dionigi being supported by playmaker Francesco Cozza, Reggina had one of the most effective offenses in the league, and the third place was well clear of fifth-placed Napoli, the club which signed Reggina's successful coach Franco Colomba following the season's end.

== Squad ==
=== Goalkeepers ===
- (Italy) Emanuele Belardi
- (Italy) Maurizio Franzone
- (Czech Republic) Martin Lejsal

=== Defenders ===
- (Czech Republic) Martin Jiránek
- (Italy) Alessandro Zoppetti
- (Italy) Giovanni Morabito
- (Chile) Jorge Vargas
- (Italy) Ivan Franceschini
- (Italy) Francesco Baldini
- (Italy) Antonio Giosa
- (Italy) Giancarlo Cinetto
- (France) Arnauld Mercier

=== Midfielders ===
- (Argentina) Ricardo Verón
- (Italy) Salvatore Vicari
- (Portugal) José Mamede
- (Italy) Francesco Cozza
- (Honduras) Julio León
- (Argentina) Damián Álvarez
- (Brazil) Mozart
- (Italy) Stefano Casale
- (Italy) Salvatore Ricca

=== Attackers ===
- (Italy) Gianluca Savoldi
- (Italy) Davide Dionigi
- (Albania) Erjon Bogdani
- (Argentina) Gustavo Reggi
- (Italy) Mario La Canna
- (Italy) Gianluca Macrì

== Serie B ==
Pos	Team	Pld	W	D	L	GF	GA	GD	Pts	Promotion or relegation
1	Como (P, C)	38	22	8	8	53	35	+18	74	Promotion to Serie A
2	Modena (P)	38	20	12	6	58	23	+35	72	Promotion to Serie A
3	Reggina (P)	38	19	11	8	50	33	+17	68	Promotion to Serie A
4	Empoli (P)	38	19	10	9	60	35	+25	67	Promotion to Serie A
5	Napoli	38	16	13	9	48	39	+9	61	

Source: Almanacco Illustrato del Calcio - La Storia 1898-2004, Panini Edizioni, Modena, September 2005
Rules for classification: 1) points; 2) head-to-head points; 3) head-to-head goal difference; 4) head-to-head goals scored; 5) goal difference; 6) number of goals scored.
(C) Champions; (P) Promoted
