= 2002–03 Reggina Calcio season =

Reggina
2002–03 season
- Chairman: Pasquale Foti
- Manager: Bortolo Mutti; Luigi De Canio
- Serie A: 14th
- Coppa Italia: Last 16
- Top goalscorer: Emiliano Bonazzoli (7); Shunsuke Nakamura (7); David Di Michele (7)

Reggina Calcio just renewed its Serie A contract, thanks to a late surge in the league competition and a successful spareggio against Atalanta. Reggina drew 0–0 at home, and then turned around a deficit to win 2–1 away from home, with Francesco Cozza and Emiliano Bonazzoli being the match-winners. The player who got the most headlines during the season was Japanese playmaker Shunsuke Nakamura, who scored seven goals and created several others. He also helped Reggina to get onto the Asian market, so the signing was largely hailed as a genial manoeuvre by president Pasquale Foti.

== Squad ==
=== Goalkeepers ===
- (Italy) Luca Castellazzi
- (Italy) Emanuele Belardi
- (Czech Republic) Martin Lejsal

=== Defenders ===
- (Czech Republic) Martin Jiránek
- (Italy) Gianluca Falsini
- (Italy) Bruno Cirillo
- (Italy) Giovanni Morabito
- (Italy) Ivan Franceschini
- (Italy) Stefano Torrisi
- (Italy) Aimo Diana
- (Italy) Roberto Cardinale
- (Italy) Alessandro Pierini

=== Midfielders ===
- (Paraguay) Carlos Paredes
- (Japan) Shunsuke Nakamura
- (Honduras) Julio León
- (Portugal) José Mamede
- (Italy) Giandomenico Mesto
- (Brazil) Mozart
- (Italy) Francesco Cozza
- (Argentina) Ricardo Verón

=== Attackers ===
- (Italy) Emiliano Bonazzoli
- (Italy) Gianluca Savoldi
- (Italy) David Di Michele
- (Italy) Massimo Rastelli
- (Albania) Erjon Bogdani

== Serie A ==
| Pos | Team | Pld | W | D | L | GF | GA | GD | Pts | Qualification or relegation |
|---|---|---|---|---|---|---|---|---|---|---|
| 12 | Modena | 34 | 9 | 11 | 14 | 30 | 48 | −18 | 38 (Note: Modena finished ahead of Empoli, Atalanta and Reggina on head-to-head points: Modena: 10 pts, Empoli: 9 pts, Atalanta: 7 pts, Reggina: 5 pts.) | |
| 13 | Empoli | 34 | 9 | 11 | 14 | 36 | 46 | −10 | 38 | |
| 14 | Reggina | 34 | 10 | 8 | 16 | 38 | 53 | −15 | 38 | Relegation tie-breaker |
| 15 | Atalanta (R) | 34 | 8 | 14 | 12 | 35 | 47 | −12 | 38 | Serie B after tie-breaker (Note: Atalanta to 2003–04 Serie B after tie-breaker.) |
| 16 | Piacenza (R) | 34 | 8 | 6 | 20 | 44 | 62 | −18 | 30 | Relegation to Serie B |

Source: 2002–03 Serie A, Soccerway
Rules for classification: 1) Points; 2) Head-to-head points; 3) Head-to-head goal difference; 4) Goal difference; 5) Goals scored; 6) Draw. (Note: Head-to-head record is used only after all the matches between the teams in question have been played).
(R) Relegated

=== Matches ===
- Perugia-Reggina 2-0
- 1-0 Fabrizio Miccoli (51)
- 2-0 Giovanni Tedesco (80)
- Reggina-Inter 1-2
- 0-1 Christian Vieri (7)
- 1-1 Shunsuke Nakamura (90 + 2 pen)
- 1-2 Álvaro Recoba (90 + 3)
- Como-Reggina 1-1
- 1-0 Benito Carbone (17)
- 1-1 Shunsuke Nakamura (63)
- Reggina-Brescia 2-2
- 0-1 Stephen Appiah (10)
- 1-1 Alessandro Pierini (44)
- 1-2 Roberto Baggio (45 + 2 pen)
- 2-2 Shunsuke Nakamura (82)
- Udinese-Reggina 1-0
- 1-0 David Pizarro (51 pen)
- Reggina-Torino 2-1
- 0-1 Alessandro Conticchio (47)
- 1-1 Erjon Bogdani (54)
- 2-1 Carlos Paredes (80)
- Milan-Reggina 2-0
- 1-0 Filippo Inzaghi (20)
- 2-0 Rivaldo (64)
- Reggina-Lazio 0-3
- 0-1 Stefano Fiore (16)
- 0-2 Dejan Stanković (33)
- 0-3 Bernardo Corradi (53)
- Reggina-Modena 0-1
- 0-1 Rubens Pasino (80)
- Empoli-Reggina 4-2
- 1-0 Antonio Di Natale (3)
- 1-1 Shunsuke Nakamura (39)
- 2-1 Antonio Di Natale (40)
- 3-1 Tommaso Rocchi (53 pen)
- 3-2 Jorge Vargas (81)
- 4-2 Antonio Di Natale (90 + 2)
- Reggina-Atalanta 1-1
- 0-1 Carmine Gautieri (34)
- 1-1 Gianluca Savoldi (56)
- Reggina-Chievo 1-1
- 1-0 Shunsuke Nakamura (23 pen)
- 1-1 Nicola Legrottaglie (49)
- Parma-Reggina 2-0
- 1-0 Adriano (57)
- 2-0 Adriano (79)
- Roma-Reggina 3-0
- 1-0 Walter Samuel (3)
- 2-0 Francesco Totti (24)
- 3-0 Vincenzo Montella (70)
- Reggina-Piacenza 3-1
- 0-1 Nicola Boselli (13)
- 1-1 Gianluca Savoldi (49)
- 2-1 Gianluca Savoldi (64)
- 3-1 David Di Michele (77 pen)
- Juventus-Reggina 5-0
- 1-0 Antonio Conte (22)
- 2-0 David Trezeguet (34)
- 3-0 Francesco Cozza (65 og)
- 4-0 Alessandro Del Piero (72)
- 5-0 Marco Di Vaio (84)
- Reggina-Bologna 1-0
- 1-0 Gianluca Savoldi (15)
- Lazio-Reggina 0-1
- 0-1 Emiliano Bonazzoli (46)
- Reggina-Perugia 3-1
- 1-0 David Di Michele (1)
- 1-1 Rahman Rezaei (2)
- 2-1 Francesco Cozza (27)
- 3-1 Emiliano Bonazzoli (47)
- Inter-Reggina 3-0
- 1-0 Christian Vieri (10)
- 2-0 Mohamed Kallon (39)
- 3-0 Mohamed Kallon (42 pen)
- Reggina-Como 4-1
- 0-1 Nicola Caccia (13)
- 1-1 Francesco Cozza (33)
- 2-1 Francesco Cozza (38)
- 3-1 Aimo Diana (79)
- 4-1 Mozart (88)
- Brescia-Reggina 2-1
- 1-0 Roberto Baggio (60)
- 2-0 Fabio Petruzzi (67)
- 2-1 David Di Michele (69)
- Reggina-Udinese 3-2
- 1-0 Emiliano Bonazzoli (3)
- 1-1 David Pizarro (8 pen)
- 2-1 David Di Michele (12)
- 2-2 Vincenzo Iaquinta (45)
- 3-2 Francesco Cozza (65)
- Torino-Reggina 1-0
- 1-0 Marco Ferrante (12 pen)
- Reggina-Milan 0-0
- Modena-Reggina 2-1
- 1-0 Iacopo Balestri (61)
- 2-0 Giuseppe Sculli (89)
- 2-1 Gianluca Savoldi (90 + 4)
- Reggina-Empoli 1-0
- 1-0 Shunsuke Nakamura (54 pen)
- Atalanta-Reggina 1-1
- 1-0 Cristiano Doni (9)
- 1-1 Emiliano Bonazzoli (52)
- Chievo-Reggina 2-1
- 1-0 Federico Cossato (24)
- 1-1 Federico Cossato (42 og)
- 2-1 Nicola Legrottaglie (73)
- Reggina-Parma 0-0
- Reggina-Roma 1-3
- 1-0 Emiliano Bonazzoli (15)
- 1-1 Damiano Tommasi (61)
- 1-2 Emerson (63)
- 1-3 Jorge Vargas (68 og)
- 2-3 Shunsuke Nakamura (90 + 2)
- Piacenza-Reggina 2-2
- 0-1 David Di Michele (68)
- 1-1 Dario Hübner (72)
- 2-1 Dario Hübner (75)
- 2-2 Mozart (77)
- Reggina-Juventus 2-1
- 1-0 David Di Michele (17)
- 1-1 Marcelo Zalayeta (23)
- 2-1 Emiliano Bonazzoli (51)
- Bologna-Reggina 0-2
- 0-1 Emiliano Bonazzoli (13)
- 0-2 David Di Michele (68)

=== Relegation Playoffs ===
- Reggina-Atalanta 0-0
- Atalanta-Reggina 1-2
- 1-0 Cesare Natali (18)
- 1-1 Francesco Cozza (33)
- 1-2 Emiliano Bonazzoli (85)

Reggina qualified for the 2003-04 Serie A.

=== Topscorers ===
- (Italy) Emiliano Bonazzoli 7
- (Japan) Shunsuke Nakamura 7
- (Italy) David Di Michele 7
- (Italy) Gianluca Savoldi 5
- (Italy) Francesco Cozza 4
