= Tiago Ferreira =

Tiago Ferreira may refer to:

- Tiago Ferreira (cyclist), Portuguese mountain biker
- Tiago Ferreira (footballer, born 1975), Portuguese football coach and former goalkeeper
- Tiago Ferreira (footballer, born 1993), Portuguese football centre-back for União de Leiria
- Tiago Ferreira (footballer, born 2002), Portuguese football winger for Sporting CP
- Tiago Ferreira (footballer, born 2007), Portuguese football winger for SC Braga
- Tiago Ferreira (swimmer), Brazilian para swimmer

== See also ==
- Jacksen Ferreira Tiago, Brazilian footballer
