= Omar Milanetto =

Italian footballer (born 1975)

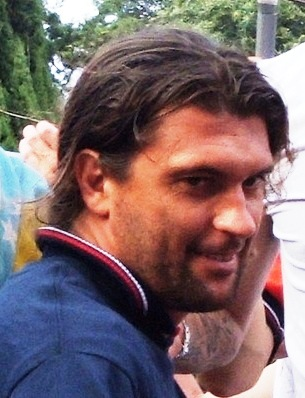

Personal information
- Date of birth: November 30, 1975 (age 50)
- Place of birth: Venaria Reale, Italy
- Height: 1.75 m (5 ft 9 in)
- Position: Midfielder

Team information
- Current team: Cesena (chief scout)

Youth career
- 1990–1993: Genoa
- 1993–1994: Juventus

Senior career*
Years	Team	Apps	(Gls)
1993–1994	Juventus	0	(0)
1994–1997	Fiorenzuola	64	(3)
1996–1997	→ Monza (loan)	19	(2)
1997–2000	Como	81	(5)
2000–2004	Modena	114	(13)
2004–2006	Brescia	64	(9)
2006–2011	Genoa	154	(10)
2011–2012	Padova	15	(4)
Total		511	(46)

Managerial career
- 2013–2019: Genoa (chief scout)
- 2019–2020: Torino (chief scout)
- 2020–2022: Hellas Verona (chief scout)
- 2023–: Cesena (chief scout)
- * Club domestic league appearances and goals

Omar Milanetto (born 30 November 1975 in Venaria Reale) is an Italian former footballer, who last played for Serie B side Padova as a midfielder as of 2012. A physical, experienced, hard-working, and tactically intelligent player, Milanetto was usually deployed as a defensive or central midfielder, where he was also capable of operating as a deep-lying playmaker. In addition to his creativity, strength, playmaking skills, and his ability to control the tempo of his team's play, he was also known for his accuracy from set-pieces, penalties, and shots from distance.

== Career ==
Milanetto began his career with Juventus in 1993; although he did not make a single appearance for the senior side during the 1993–94 season, he won the 1994 Torneo di Viareggio and the Campionato Nazionale Primavera with the Juventus Youth side. He later played for several different clubs during the following seasons, including Fiorenzuola, Monza (on loan), and Como. In 2000, he joined Serie C1/A side Modena, and helped the club to achieve successive promotions, eventually making his Serie A debut during the 2002–03 season. Following the retirement of Roberto Baggio in 2004, he joined Serie A club Brescia, where he was re-united with his former Modena coach Gianni De Biasi, although he was unable to save the club from relegation during his first season, spending his second season with the club in Serie B. In 2006, he transferred to Serie B side Genoa, where he remained for five seasons, helping the club to Serie A promotion.

On 26 July 2011, after initially being linked with Lugano, it was announced that Milanetto had joined Padova, after a furious row with the Genoa supporters. The midfielder had been a very popular figure with the fans, but his rapport with the club's ultras was damaged when he hurled an insult at the Gradinata Nord during the Derby della Lanterna against Sampdoria, after providing the winning assist to Mauro Boselli.

== Match-fixing and retirement ==
On 28 May 2012, Milanetto was arrested by Italian police for his alleged involvement in the Calcioscommesse sports betting scandal. He subsequently cancelled his contract with Padova, retiring from football in August 2012; he later took up a position as a scout for his former club, Genoa, in October 2013.

In the 2019-20 season he was a scout at Torino, before moving to Hellas Verona in an identical position ahead of the 2020-21 season. In 2023, he joined Cesena FC as their new chief scout.

== Honours ==
=== Club ===
Juventus Primavera

- Torneo di Viareggio: 1994
- Campionato Nazionale Primavera: 1993–94
