= Tiago Ferreira (footballer, born 2002) =

Portuguese footballer

Personal information
- Full name: Tiago Filipe Prazeres Ferreira
- Date of birth: 18 March 2002 (age 24)
- Place of birth: Reggio Calabria, Italy
- Height: 1.71 m (5 ft 7 in)
- Position: Winger

Team information
- Current team: Portimonense
- Number: 18

Youth career
- 2010–2021: Sporting CP

Senior career*
Years	Team	Apps	(Gls)
2021–2024	Sporting CP B	39	(6)
2023–2024	Sporting CP	0	(0)
2024–2025	Estrela da Amadora	3	(0)
2025–	Portimonense	27	(2)

International career
2017	Portugal U15	5	(0)
2017–2018	Portugal U16	7	(0)
2019	Portugal U17	1	(0)
2019–2020	Portugal U18	6	(1)
- * Club domestic league appearances and goals as of 20 June 2026

Tiago Filipe Prazeres Ferreira (born 18 March 2002), sometimes known as Tiago Mamede, is a Portuguese professional footballer who plays as a winger for Liga Portugal 2 club Portimonense.

== Club career ==
Born and raised in Italy, Ferreira moved to Portugal and joined the Sporting CP youth academy in 2010. He signed his first professional contract with Sporting in 2019, and on 17 December 2020 extended it until 2025. He debuted with the Sporting CP B in 2021, and in the preseason 2021–22 season joined the senior squad, before a knee injury in November 2021 kept him out. He returned from injury a year and a half later in March 2022, returning to Sporting B. He made his senior debut with Sporting as a substitute in a 2–1 UEFA Europa League win over Raków Częstochowa on 9 November 2023.

In June 2024, Ferreira joined Primeira Liga club Estrela da Amadora on a two-year contract. At the end of the season, having struggled for game time at the Amadora-based side, he dropped down to Liga Portugal 2, joining Portimonense on a two-year contract, with an option for a further year.

== International career ==
Born in Italy, Ferreira is of Portuguese descent. He is a youth international for Portugal, having played up to the Portugal U18s.

== Personal life ==
Ferreira is the son of the former footballer José Mamede.

== Career statistics ==
As of 17 June 2024

Appearances and goals by club, season and competition
Club	Season	League			Cup		Europe		Total	
Club	Season	Division	Apps	Goals	Apps	Goals	Apps	Goals	Apps	Goals
Sporting CP B	2020–21	Campeonato de Portugal	10	0	—		—		10	0
Sporting CP B	2021–22	Liga 3	0	0	—		—		0	0
Sporting CP B	2022–23	Liga 3	5	3	—		—		5	3
Sporting CP B	2023–24	Liga 3	24	3	—		—		24	3
Sporting CP B	Total		39	6	—		—		39	6
Sporting CP	2023–24	Primeira Liga	0	0	0	0	1 (Note: Appearance in UEFA Europa League)	0	1	0
Career total			39	6	0	0	1	0	40	6
