= Ciro De Cesare =

Italian footballer (born 1971)

Personal information
- Date of birth: 16 December 1971 (age 54)
- Place of birth: Salerno, Italy
- Height: 1.84 m (6 ft 0 in)
- Position: Striker

Senior career*
Years	Team	Apps	(Gls)
1994	Cavese	9	(1)
1995	Boys Caivanese	21	(3)
1995–1996	Turris	31	(4)
1996–1997	Casarano	33	(4)
1997–1998	Salernitana	32	(5)
1998–1999	Chievo	36	(14)
2000	Salernitana	16	(4)
2000–2001	Chievo	38	(8)
2001	Siena	14	(1)
2002	Spezia	14	(3)
2002	Como	5	(0)
2003	Piacenza	16	(3)
2003–2004	Palmese	12	(8)
2004–2005	Frosinone	47	(15)
2005–2006	Salernitana	31	(3)
2006–2007	Neapolis	18	(2)
2008	Potenza	11	(4)
2008–2009	Mugnano		
2009	Potenza	18	(3)
2010	Aversa Normanna	5	(0)
2010–2011	CS Pisticci		
2011	Battipagliese	15	(11)
2011–2012	Salernitana		
2012	Nola	4	(1)
2012–2013	Flaminia		
2013	Scafatese		
2013	Isernia		

Managerial career
- 2016–2017: Salernitana (U17)
- 2017–2018: Agropoli
- 2018–2020: Castel San Giorgio
- 2021–2022: Castel San Giorgio
- 2022–2023: Calpazio
- * Club domestic league appearances and goals

Ciro De Cesare (born 16 December 1971) is an Italian football coach and a former striker who played for numerous teams in Serie A, Serie B and Serie C.

== Career ==
In 1997, De Cesare was hired by Salerno, his hometown team.

De Cesare played for the A.C. ChievoVerona side that achieved historic promotion to Serie A in 2001, scoring eight goals in 35 Serie B appearances. He began the 2001–02 Serie A season with Chievo, making three appearances, before going out on loan to Siena Calcio and A.S.D. Spezia Calcio 2008.
