= Alessandro Del Piero =

Italian footballer (born 1974)

Alessandro Del Piero OMRI
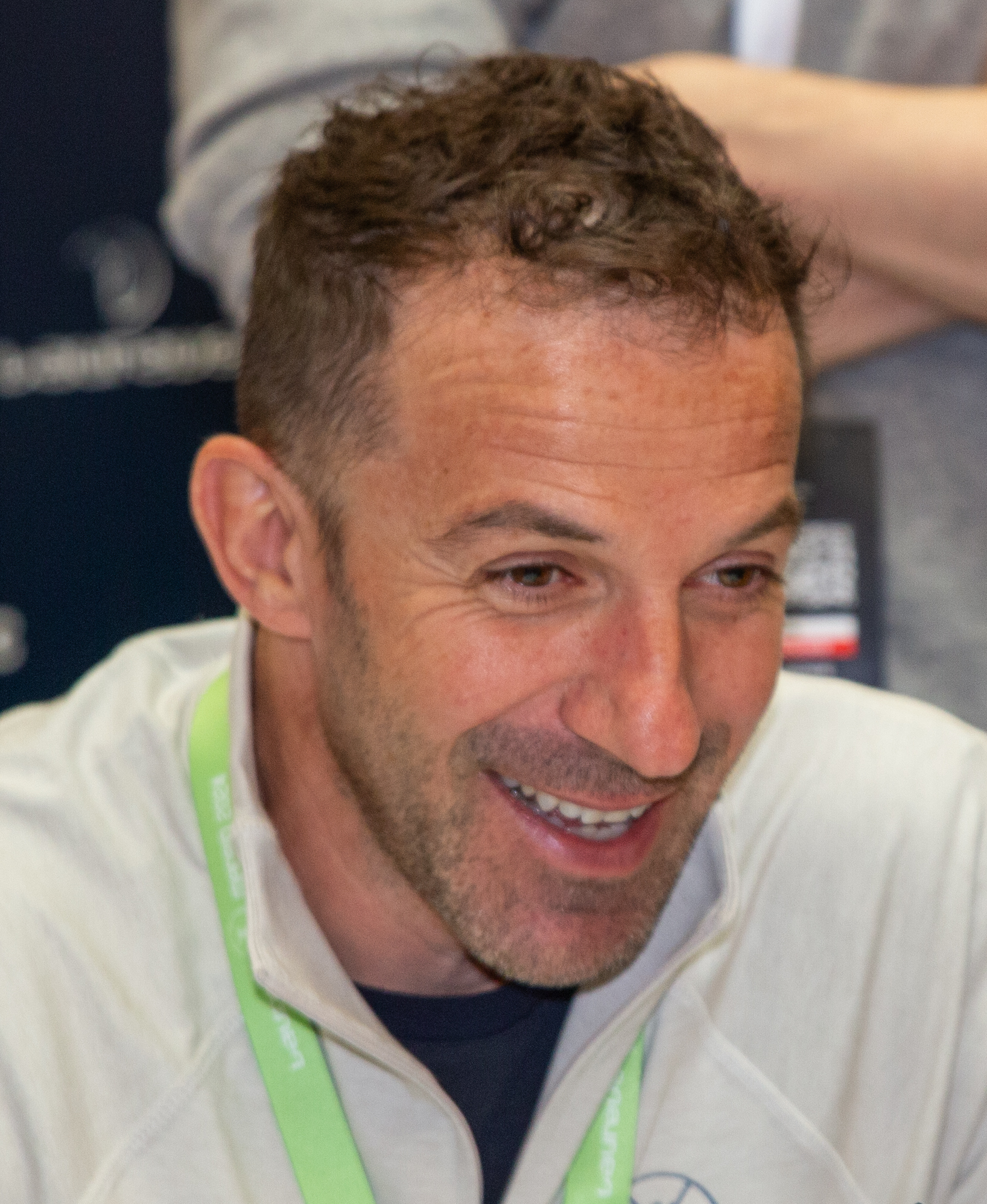
- Del Piero in 2024

Personal information
- Full name: Alessandro Del Piero
- Date of birth: 9 November 1974 (age 52)
- Place of birth: Conegliano, Italy
- Height: 1.74 m (5 ft 9 in)
- Position: Second striker

Youth career
- 1982–1988: San Vendemiano
- 1988–1991: Padova

Senior career*
Years	Team	Apps	(Gls)
1991–1993	Padova	14	(1)
1993–2012	Juventus	513	(208)
2012–2014	Sydney FC	48	(24)
2014	Delhi Dynamos	10	(1)
Total		585	(234)

International career
1991	Italy U17	3	(1)
1992–1993	Italy U18	14	(12)
1993–1996	Italy U21	12	(3)
1995–2008	Italy	91	(27)
Medal record
Men's football
Representing Italy
FIFA World Cup
Winner	2006 Germany
UEFA European Championship
Runner-up	2000 Belgium–Netherlands
- * Club domestic league appearances and goals

Alessandro Del Piero Ufficiale OMRI (Italian pronunciation: [alesˈsandro del ˈpjɛːro]; born 9 November 1974) is an Italian former professional footballer who mainly played as a second striker, although he was capable of playing in several offensive positions. Since 2015, he has worked as a pundit for Sky Sport Italia. A technically gifted and creative supporting forward who was also a free-kick specialist, he is regarded as one of the greatest players of all time and one of the greatest players in Juventus's history. He is currently the second highest all-time Italian top-scorer in all competitions, with 346 goals, behind only Silvio Piola, with 390 goals. In his career Del Piero scored 462 goals.

Del Piero began his career at Padova in Serie B before being signed by Italian giants Juventus in 1993. He quickly established himself as a key player, particularly in the UEFA Champions League, helping the club reach three consecutive finals from 1996 to 1998, winning the 1996 edition. During this period, he scored 20 goals in 27 Champions League appearances, finishing as the competition's top scorer in 1997–98. Del Piero later helped Juventus win back-to-back Serie A titles in 2001–02 and 2002–03, while also reaching his fourth Champions League final in the latter season. After Juventus were forcibly relegated to Serie B in 2006 due to the Calciopoli scandal, Del Piero chose to remain at the club despite the departures of several key players, and captained them back to Serie A after a single season in the second division.

Del Piero played at Juventus for 19 seasons (11 as captain) and holds the club records for most goals (290) and appearances (705). In total, he won 16 trophies at the club, including six Serie A titles, and won the Serie A Italian Footballer of the Year award in 1998 and 2008. After leaving the club in 2012, he also spent two seasons with Australian side Sydney FC; he retired in 2014, after a season with Delhi Dynamos FC in the Indian Super League.

At international level, Del Piero has also represented the Italy national team at three FIFA World Cups and four UEFA European Football Championships, most notably winning the 2006 World Cup, and reaching the final of UEFA Euro 2000 with Italy. He is the joint fourth highest scorer for Italy, with 27 goals. In 2004, Del Piero was named in the FIFA 100, a list of the 125 greatest living footballers selected by Pelé as a part of FIFA's centenary celebrations. In the same year, he was also voted into the UEFA Golden Jubilee Poll, a list of the 50 best European players of the past 50 years. Along with six awards in Italy for gentlemanly conduct, he has also won the Golden Foot award, which pertains to personality as well as playing ability.

== Early life ==
Del Piero was born in Conegliano, Veneto, the son of Gino, an electrician, and Bruna, a housekeeper. He regularly played football in the backyard with two friends, Nelso and Pierpaolo, as a child. All three dreamed of becoming footballers but only Del Piero eventually managed to do so. His older brother, Stefano, briefly played professional football for Sampdoria before an injury curtailed his career; he later worked as his younger brother's agent. The family lived in the hamlet of Saccon, a rural home in San Vendemiano. While growing up, Del Piero's family did not have much money for travelling abroad, so he considered being a lorry driver in order to see the world.

While playing for the local youth team of San Vendemiano, Del Piero used to feature as a goalkeeper in order to gain more playing time. His mother thought it would be better for him to play in this role, as he would not sweat, and the possibility of him getting injured was less likely. His brother Stefano commented to their mother that, due to his skill, the younger Del Piero was more suited to playing in a more offensive position, and he switched to a forward role.

== Club career ==
=== Padova ===
==== 1991–1993: Early career and debut ====
Del Piero began his rise to professional football in 1981, in the ranks of San Vendemiano. In 1988, Del Piero was first spotted by scouts, and he left home at the young age of 13 to play with the youth side of Padova. He joined the senior side during the 1991–92 season, at the age of 16, and at the age of 17, he made his debut in Serie B against Messina, under manager Mauro Sandreani, on 15 March 1992, coming on as a substitute for Roberto Putelli. The following season, on 22 November 1992, he scored his first professional goal in a 5–0 victory over Ternana. In 1993, thanks to Giampiero Boniperti, Del Piero was bought by Juventus for five billion lire, with an overlap of 150 million lire per season.

=== Juventus ===
==== 1993–1998: Early domestic and European success ====
In 1993, Del Piero transferred to Juventus and played for the Torinese club for 19 seasons until being released in the summer of 2012. Although manager Giovanni Trapattoni insisted that he trained with the senior team, he initially played with the Primavera squad, which was coached by Antonello Cuccureddu, helping the Juventus Youth team to win both the 1994 Torneo di Viareggio, and the 1994 U-20 championship. Del Piero made his Serie A debut against Foggia on 12 September 1993 under Trapattoni, as a substitute, and he scored his first goal in his next game against Reggiana on 19 September, after coming off the bench once again. On his full debut for Juventus, he netted a hat-trick against Parma. After his promising performances, Del Piero began to be deployed with more continuity, and he managed 14 appearances for Juventus that season between youth matches, league matches, the Coppa Italia, and the UEFA Cup, scoring 5 goals, which all came in Serie A, as Juventus finished the season in second place in the league.

The 1994–95 Serie A season saw Marcello Lippi take over as Juventus manager, as well as the introduction of a new team of directors, made up of Giraudo, Roberto Bettega, and Luciano Moggi; Del Piero played a more prominent role for the club that season following Roberto Baggio's injury in November against Padova. Del Piero temporarily took his place in the first team alongside Gianluca Vialli and Fabrizio Ravanelli, flourishing at the opportunity given to him, and Juventus went on to claim their first scudetto in nine years. Del Piero scored 8 goals in Serie A that season, including a match-winning chipped volley against Fiorentina. Del Piero was also able to achieve a rare double, and he captured the 1994–95 Coppa Italia with Juventus, defeating their season rivals Parma in the final, although they were defeated by Parma in the 1995 UEFA Cup Final. During this time, Del Piero earned the nickname Pinturicchio due to the similarity between his own technical and tactical characteristics, and Baggio's creative style of play. This nickname arose when former president Gianni Agnelli compared the emerging talent Del Piero to the renaissance artist Pinturicchio, who was the student of the great Italian renaissance artist Raphael (Raffaello), a nickname he had used to describe Baggio, to emphasise his elegance on the ball. Del Piero placed fourth in the 1995 Ballon d'Or for his performances throughout the season. With the Turin club, Del Piero won the Serie A eight times, although the 2005 and 2006 titles were revoked due to Juventus's involvement in the 2006 Italian football scandal.

For the 1995–96 season, Del Piero was awarded Baggio's No. 10 squad number, which had also previously belonged to Michel Platini, following his departure to A.C. Milan. Del Piero scored 6 goals and provided 10 assists in Serie A, although Juventus finished the season in second place behind Milan. Del Piero did manage to capture the Supercoppa Italiana in 1995, over Parma, setting up Vialli's only goal of the match. He also played a key role in helping Juventus to win the 1995–96 UEFA Champions League, scoring 6 goals in the competition, and finishing as the second highest scorer of the tournament.

The following season, Del Piero followed these victories up with the 1996 UEFA Super Cup and the 1996 Intercontinental Cup, scoring goals in both finals, and being named Man of the Match in the latter final; he also won the Bravo Award (as the best U-23 player in European Competitions), and placed 4th in the 1996 Ballon d'Or for the second consecutive year. Del Piero also captured his second Serie A title with Juventus that season, and helped lead Juventus to their second consecutive Champions League final, although he was unable to start the match due to injury. During the group stage, en route to the final, he helped Juventus to qualify for the quarter-finals a match early, scoring a goal in Juventus's 1–0 win over Manchester United at Old Trafford, on 20 November 1996; this was the first time that an Italian team had defeated Manchester United at their home ground. In the 1997 UEFA Champions League Final, he came off the bench to score a goal with a back-heel, which was unable to prevent Juventus from losing 3–1 to Borussia Dortmund. Due to his performances throughout the calendar year, Del Piero received nominations for both the 1997 FIFA World Player of the Year, finishing sixth and the 1997 Ballon d'Or.

Del Piero began the following campaign strongly by winning the 1997 Supercoppa Italiana, forming a strong offensive unit with Juventus teammates Zinedine Zidane in midfield, and newcomer Filippo Inzaghi upfront. The 1997–98 Serie A campaign was his best season yet, as he scored a joint career best of 21 goals in Serie A, and finished top scorer in the 1997–98 UEFA Champions League with 10 goals, one of which included a freekick and a hat-trick against Monaco in the semi-finals. With these goals, he helped Juventus to reach their third consecutive Champions League final, although Del Piero was not fully fit for the match, and Juventus were once again defeated, falling 1–0 to Real Madrid from a strike by Predrag Mijatović on 20 May. Domestic success, however, was achieved that season, after a tight battle with Inter Milan, as Juventus celebrated its 25th Serie A title over their Italian rivals, with Del Piero scoring a memorable and decisive individual match-winning goal during the controversial Derby d'Italia match. Del Piero also managed a goal in the 1997–98 Coppa Italia that season, helping Juventus to the semi-finals, and finishing the season with a career best of 32 goals in all competitions. Del Piero was awarded the Serie A Italian Footballer of the Year award for his performances, and he was also nominated for the 1998 Ballon d'Or. During this time, he was nicknamed by the fans as Il Fenomeno Vero ("The Real Phenomenon"), in comparison with the Brazilian striker Ronaldo, who was nicknamed Il Fenomeno ("The Phenomenon") by supporters of rivals Inter Milan.

==== 1998–2001: Injury struggles ====
Juventus began the 1998–99 Serie A with a 2–1 defeat in the 1998 Supercoppa Italiana at the hands of Lazio, although Del Piero was able to score from a penalty. On 8 November 1998, Del Piero picked up a serious knee injury in the final minutes of a 2–2 draw with Udinese; this kept him out of action for the remainder of the season, as he managed only 2 goals. The club struggled without him, finishing the league season in a disappointing sixth place. Juventus did manage to reach the semi-finals of the 1998–99 UEFA Champions League, losing out to eventual champions Manchester United. Following his serious injury, Del Piero underwent a muscle strengthening regime in order to adapt to the increasingly more physical and athletic demands of twenty-first century football, which allowed him to compensate for the loss of some of his pace and agility. Due to his dramatic weight gain and physical development during this period, as well as the club's success during the mid to late 90s, Del Piero, along with several other Juventus players and staff members, was claimed of being involved in illegal performance-enhancing drug abuse; after a lengthy investigation, the club's staff members incriminated were eventually cleared of all doping allegations in 2005.

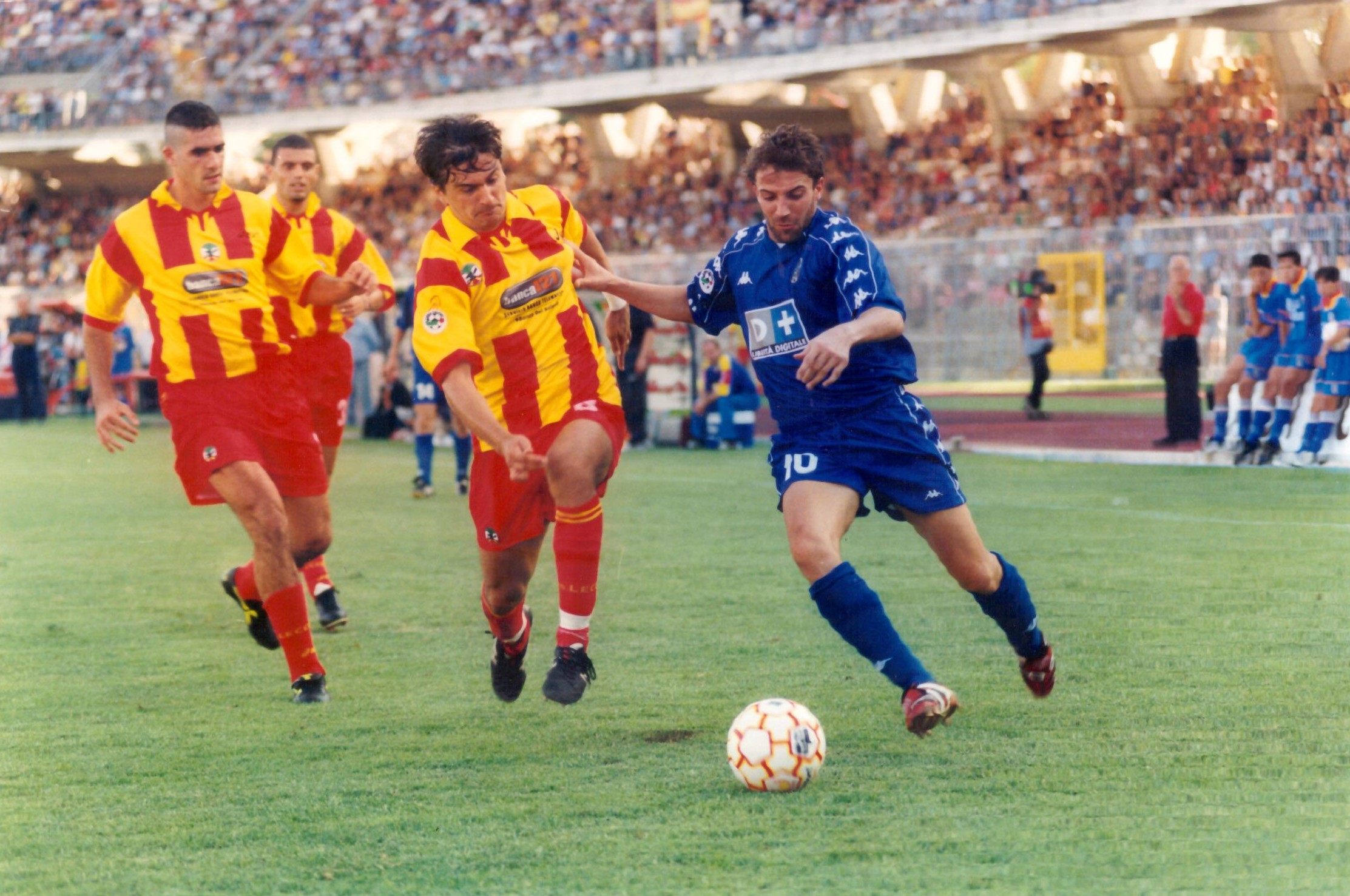
Del Piero (right) playing for Juventus in September 1999 against Lecce

During the next season under new manager Carlo Ancelotti, Del Piero primarily served as an assist-man, providing 14 assists in Serie A, the most in the league that season, and 20 in all competitions. He faced criticism, however, for his inability to score in open play following his injury the previous season, as only one of his 9 Serie A goals that season was in open play (a header against Parma), with the rest coming from penalties. Furthermore, towards the end of the season, his once excellent attacking partnership with Inzaghi became less effective, due to Inzaghi's individualism, as well as the pair's lack of understanding and strained relationship both on and off the pitch. Del Piero helped Juventus to capture the 1999 UEFA Intertoto Cup that season, which allowed Juventus to qualify for the UEFA Cup; overall, he scored 12 goals in all competitions, as Juventus narrowly missed out on the Serie A title. In 2000, Del Piero was the world's best-paid football player from salaries, bonuses, and advertising revenue. It was during this period of recovering following his injury that the Juventus chairman, Gianni Agnelli, gave Del Piero the nickname "Godot," as he was always waiting for the player's inspiration to reappear.

The following season saw Juventus suffer another disappointing defeat losing out on the 2000–01 Serie A title once again, this time to Roma. Juventus and Del Piero began the season strongly, and Del Piero scored the winner on his season debut against Napoli on 30 September, although he later suffered another injury and fell out of form, failing to score. On 18 February 2001, Del Piero broke his goal drought, scoring in an away win over Bari. Del Piero celebrated the goal by dedicating it to his father, who had recently died. Del Piero refound his form towards the end of the season, although he was unable to help Juventus capture the Serie A title, despite scoring a goal in a 2–2 draw against Roma.

==== 2001–2004: New successes ====
Del Piero was named Juventus captain upon Lippi's return to Juventus, and he formed a formidable offensive partnership with French striker David Trezeguet, who joined in 2000, and Czech playmaker Pavel Nedvěd, who arrived in 2001. Del Piero scored 16 goals and provided several assists, as Juventus were crowned Serie A champions for a 26th time on 5 May 2002, the last match day of the season; Juventus won the title over Roma and Inter Milan by a single point, after a 2–0 away victory over Udinese, with goals from top-scorer Trezeguet and Del Piero. Del Piero managed 21 goals in all competitions, also scoring his 100th and 101st goals for Juventus that season, against Venezia, on 26 August 2001. Del Piero also helped Juventus reach the Coppa Italia final that season, although Juventus were defeated by Parma.

Juventus's title success in 2002 enabled the club to automatically qualify for the UEFA Champions League the following season. Juventus began the 2002–03 season by winning the 2002 Supercoppa Italiana over Parma, with Del Piero scoring two goals, and Juventus were also able to successfully defend their Serie A title. Del Piero scored his 100th goal in Serie A in a 2–1 win over Brescia on 27 April 2003. In the UEFA Champions League, Juventus were placed in Group E alongside Newcastle United, Dynamo Kyiv, and Feyenoord. Del Piero opened up his account in European competitions that season when he scored his side's second goal in a 5–0 victory over Dynamo Kyiv on 24 September, after combining with Nedvěd and Mauro Camoranesi.

On the next matchday, Juventus played host to Newcastle on 1 October and Del Piero hit a brace to help his club maintain the top spot in their group. Juventus advanced to the second group stage where the club managed to progress, along with Manchester United, on goal differential over FC Basel and Deportivo de La Coruña. Juventus then saw off Barcelona in the quarter-finals through an extra time goal by Marcelo Zalayeta, and faced Spanish opposition again in the likes of defending champions Real Madrid in the semi-finals. The triumvirate attacking partnership proved wonders for Juventus, as the team overturned a 2–1 first leg deficit to record a 4–3 aggregate win as all three attacking stars netted in a 3–1 home win in the second leg. Juventus faced Italian rivals AC Milan in the 2003 UEFA Champions League Final in Manchester on 28 May. After a goalless 120 minutes, the tie went to a penalty shoot-out, where Del Piero finished his spot-kick, but it wasn't enough, as Juventus fell 3–2 in the shoot-out.

The following season saw Juventus start strongly, winning the 2003 Supercoppa Italiana over Milan on penalties, although Juventus were knocked out in the round of 16 in the 2003–04 UEFA Champions League, and finished the 2003–04 Serie A season in a disappointing third place. The club did manage to reach the 2004 Coppa Italia Final, only to be defeated by Lazio. Lippi left Juventus at the end of the season to take charge of the Italy national team.

==== 2004–2006: Calciopoli and relegation ====
After Euro 2004, Juventus manager Marcello Lippi was replaced by Fabio Capello. Capello was not convinced of Del Piero's fitness levels, and frequently benched him in favour of the younger, new offensive signing Zlatan Ibrahimović. Despite his limited playing time, Del Piero still managed to score 14 goals, as Juventus won their 28th league title, due to his overhead assist to teammate David Trezeguet, which proved decisive in a match against Milan at the San Siro. Del Piero also helped Juventus to reach the quarter-finals of the 2004–05 UEFA Champions League, only losing out to eventual champions Liverpool.

Several journalists and coaches believed that Del Piero was back to his best form in the 2005–06 Serie A, as he managed 12 goals in Serie A, and 20 goals in all competitions, helping Juventus to defend the Serie A title. His role at Juventus changed during his second season under Capello, who preferred to use him as an immediate-impact substitute. Due to his lack of playing time, Del Piero's relationship with Capello was often strained.

On 10 January 2006, Del Piero became the all-time leading goalscorer for Juventus when he scored three times in a Coppa Italia match against Fiorentina, taking his total goal tally for the club to 185. The previous record holder was Giampiero Boniperti, with 182 goals. Del Piero also finished the season as the top scorer of the Coppa Italia, with 5 goals. Del Piero equalled José Altafini's Serie A record of six goals as a substitute after scoring in the final minute of Juventus' final game of the 2005–06 season, before Juventus were forcibly relegated due to the Calciopoli scandal, also having their two most recent Serie A titles revoked.

==== 2006–2007: Serie B champions ====
After Juventus were demoted to Serie B and their two most recent scudetti were revoked, Del Piero pledged that he would stay to captain the team. He underlined that players should remain with the team, explaining that "The Agnelli family deserve this, as do the fans and the new directors." While many key players such as Fabio Cannavaro, Emerson, Gianluca Zambrotta, Patrick Vieira, Zlatan Ibrahimović, and Lilian Thuram left, Del Piero chose to stay and help the club gain promotion.

"A true gentleman never leaves his lady."

— Del Piero about the "Old Lady" Juventus during Calciopoli, 2006

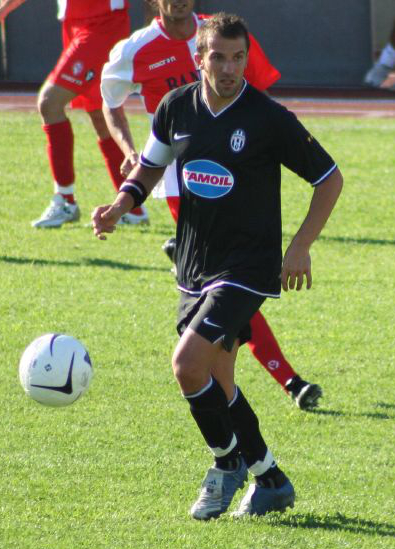
Del Piero playing for Juventus in September 2006 against Rimini during the 2006–07 Serie B season

Del Piero's first appearance after the 2006 FIFA World Cup triumph was in a Coppa Italia match against Cesena on 23 August 2006. As Juventus played in the Serie B for the 2006–07 season, the Coppa Italia campaign became increasingly important for the club in order to achieve a UEFA Cup spot. Having been on vacation beforehand, Del Piero started on the bench. Juventus and Cesena were locked on 1–1 when Del Piero entered in the 74th minute and after nine seconds, he scored the winning goal for Juventus.

Del Piero then came on as a substitute in the 61st minute during Juventus's next Coppa Italia match on 27 August, against Napoli. Once again Juventus came from behind, as Del Piero scored twice to give his team the lead. The match eventually went to penalties; although Del Piero scored his spot-kick, Napoli won 5–4 in the penalty shoot-out. Despite starting the season with a nine-point penalty from the match-fixing scandal, Juventus gained promotion to Serie A as Serie B champions; Del Piero finished the league campaign as the top scorer of the 2006–07 Serie B season, with 20 goals. During the season, Del Piero also managed his 200th goal with Juventus on 28 October 2006, in a 1–0 league victory over Frosinone.

==== 2007–2011: Return to Serie A and post-Calciopoli struggles ====
"Del Piero never really grows old."

— Diego Maradona, 2008

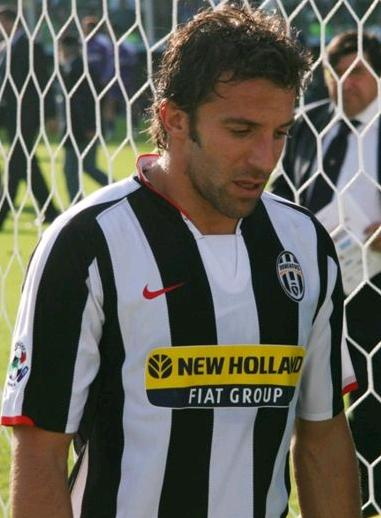
Del Piero during the 2007–08 season against Fiorentina

Following Juventus's return to Serie A, Del Piero was locked in months of fractious negotiations over the signing of a new contract with Juventus' new management. After successfully negotiating a new contract till 30 June 2010, he was greeted with news of the birth of his first child. This was quite a staggering turnaround in his fortunes, as only two weeks earlier, he was dropped by Claudio Ranieri for the Serie A match with Fiorentina, and was then axed from Roberto Donadoni's Italy squad for the games with Georgia and South Africa.

On 15 December 2007, Del Piero scored two goals away at Lazio and was named to two consecutive Serie A teams of the week. In February 2008, he scored the winning goal for Juventus from a free-kick in a 1–0 Serie A home victory over Roma. On 6 April 2008, he set a new appearance record for Juventus, overtaking Gaetano Scirea's previous tally of 552 matches in all competitions. In April, he registered seven goals in five Serie A matches, including a hat-trick in a 0–4 away win over Atalanta.

On the final weekend of the 2007–08 season, Del Piero scored a brace against Sampdoria in a 3–3 draw. These two goals were crucial, as it took him to 21 goals for the season, thus winning him the Capocannonieri prize in Serie A for the first time in his illustrious career, beating the likes of teammate David Trezeguet (20 goals) and Marco Borriello (19 goals), also matching his highest seasonal tally in Serie A since the 1997–98 season. He became only the second Italian ever to win consecutive Capocannoniere titles in two different leagues – former Juventus and 1982 World Cup hero Paolo Rossi being the other. (Coincidentally, Rossi also won the Capocannoniere titles like Del Piero – first in Serie B and then in Serie A). On 26 July, Del Piero was awarded the Scirea Award. Juventus finished the 2007–08 Serie A season in third place, which allowed them to qualify for the UEFA Champions League the following season.

Before the season, Juventus manager Claudio Ranieri remarked that Del Piero would have as good a season, or an even better one, than the previous term. In August 2008, Del Piero announced that he would try to keep playing professional football with Juventus until he turned 40. Juventus were drawn into the same Champions League group as Real Madrid, and UEFA Cup winners Zenit Saint Petersburg. Del Piero marked Juventus's return to the competition with a match-winning free kick to seal a home win against Zenit. On 21 October, Del Piero netted a notable goal as Juventus defeated Real Madrid 2–1 in Turin, scoring with a first-time, curling strike from distance, in the fifth minute of play.

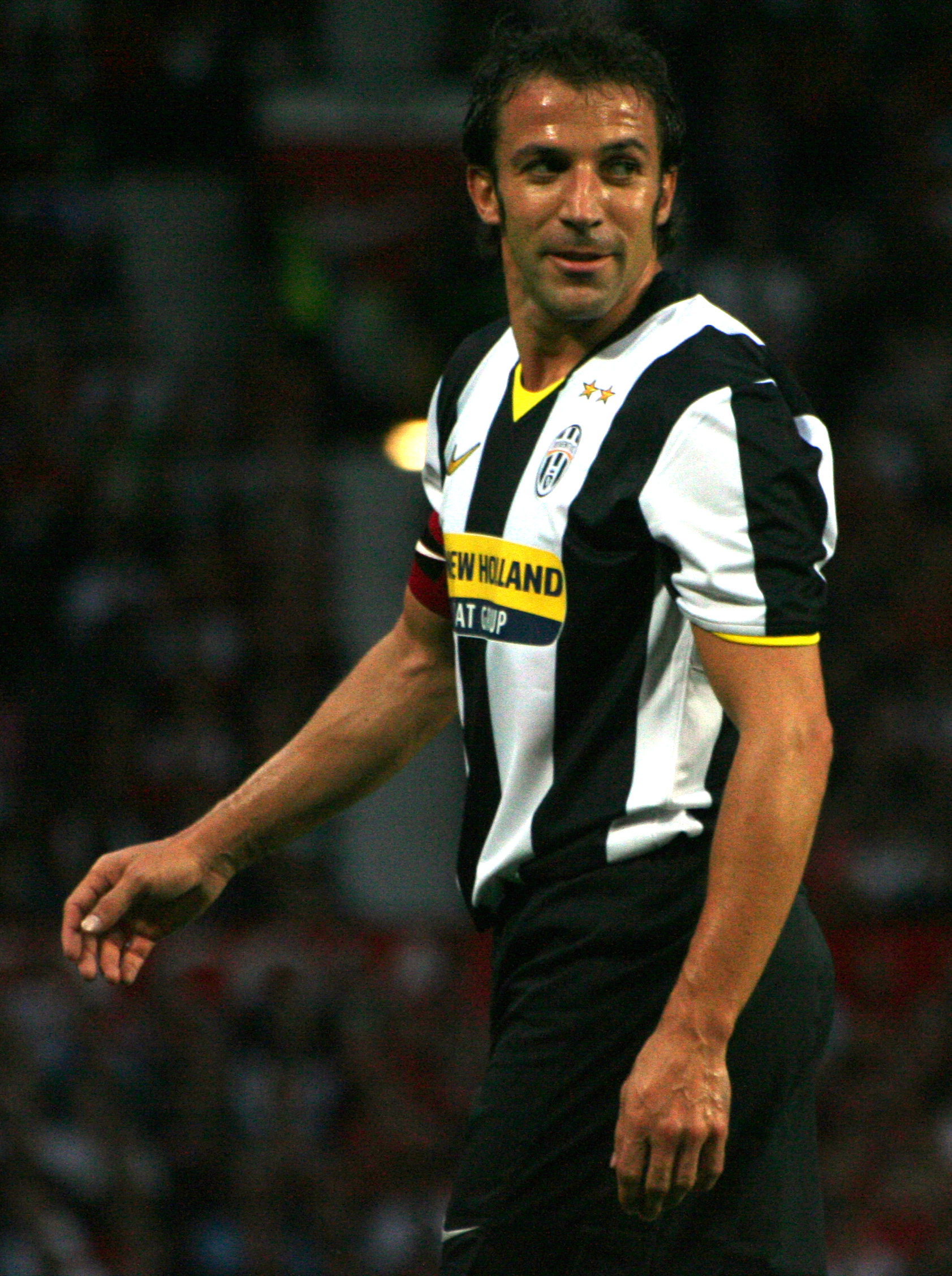
Del Piero with Juventus in the 2008–09 preseason

On 5 November 2008, Juventus and Real Madrid squared off at Santiago Bernabéu in the Champions League. The Italians won 0–2, their first away win against Madrid since 1962, and Del Piero was a key performer, scoring both goals, and drawing praise from Ranieri, as well as Real Madrid's coach Bernd Schuster. As he left the pitch after being substituted, fans from both sides gave him a standing ovation. Juventus's Champions League campaign ended in disappointment, as they were eliminated by Chelsea in the second round. Despite converting a penalty in the second leg in Turin, Del Piero was unable to prevent Juventus from losing 3–2 on aggregate.

On 29 November 2008, Del Piero scored his 250th goal for Juventus from a penalty, in a 4–0 home win over Reggina. In the league, Juventus were mostly challenging Milan for second place and an automatic Champions League spot. Most notably, Del Piero inspired Juventus to a 3–0 win over Siena in their penultimate game of the season, scoring a brace and setting up Claudio Marchisio for the youngster's third goal of the season to end their run of seven winless matches in Serie A. Juventus then went on to defeat Lazio 2–0 and clinch the second place spot in Serie A over Milan, determined by their head-to-head record.

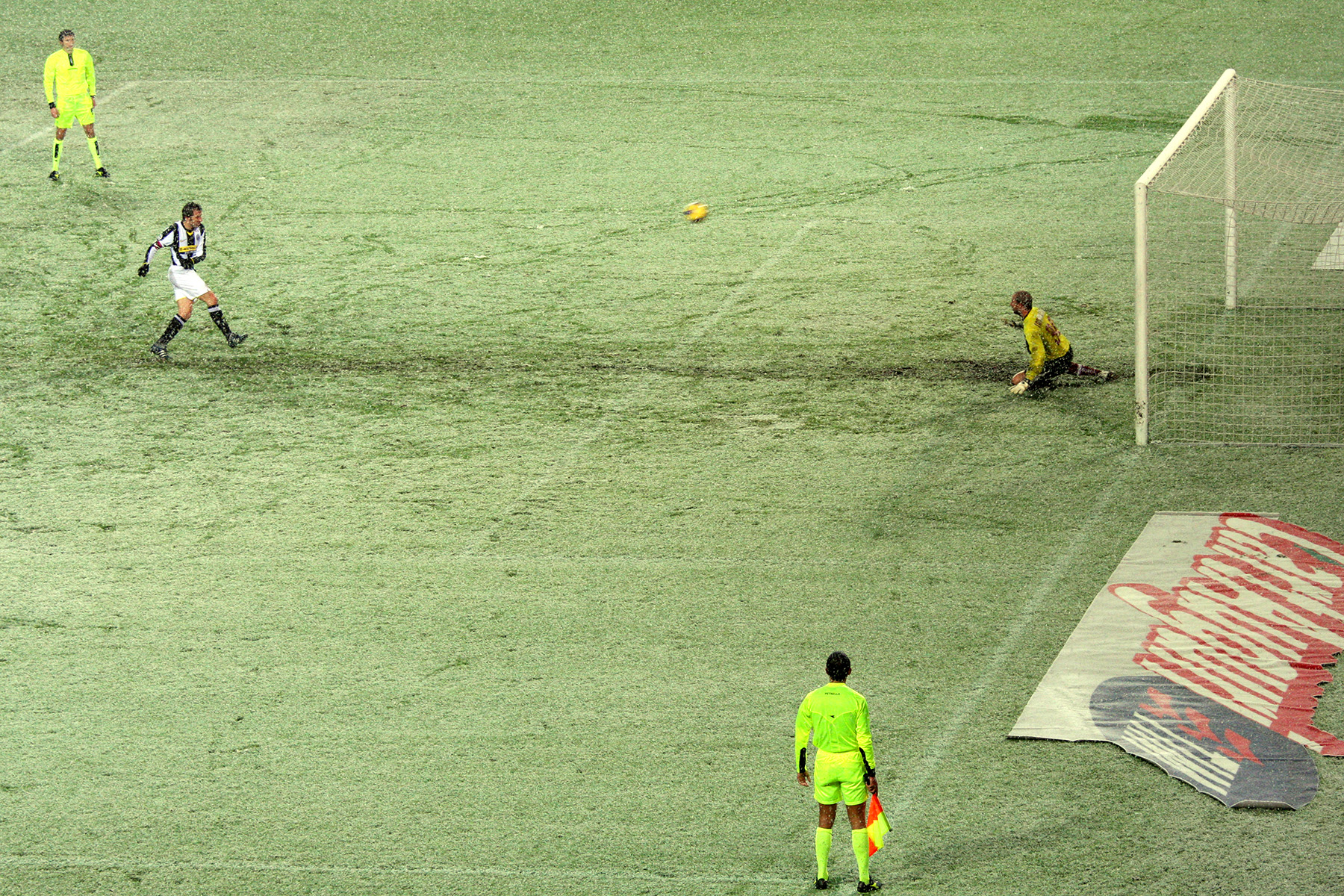
Del Piero scoring his 250th goal against Reggina in the 2008–09 Serie A season

On 17 July 2009, Del Piero extended his contract with Juventus by one more year until 30 June 2011 in Pinzolo while training for pre-season, thus practically ensuring that he would retire at the club with which he started his professional career. During his renewal, he said: "I am happy at Juventus and we are competitive. I want to keep playing for as long as I can and I'm certain that for at least two more years I will be at the top level." On 14 February 2010, Del Piero marked his 445th Serie A appearance, breaking the all-time club record previously held by Boniperti, with a brace in a 3–2 win against Genoa. Del Piero finished the season as the all-time top scorer for Juventus, having scored over 250 goals in all competitions with the club, and having also made over 600 appearances in official matches for Juventus, breaking Scirea's appearance record.

On 14 March 2010, Del Piero recorded his 300th and 301st career goals during a 3–3 draw with Siena, with the first two goals coming in the second and seventh minutes. On 30 October 2010, he recorded his 179th Serie A goal, helping his side to a 2–1 win at Milan, breaking the record of club legend Giampiero Boniperti as Juventus's top scorer in Serie A, and further cementing his status as the most prolific goalscorer in Juventus history.

On 5 February 2011, with his substitution against Cagliari, Alessandro Del Piero became the most capped Juventus player, edging out former Juventus legend Giampiero Boniperti. Del Piero was the third most capped active player in the Serie A at the time, behind Javier Zanetti and Francesco Totti, respectively. On 5 May 2011, he signed a new one-year contract to stay at the Juventus Arena. His previous deal was due to expire on 30 June 2011. On 24 May 2011, Del Piero and Juventus played against Manchester United at Old Trafford in a friendly match being former England defender Gary Neville's testimonial match. Del Piero was substituted after 65 minutes to a standing ovation from the United supporters.

==== 2011–2012: Champion again in final season with Juventus ====
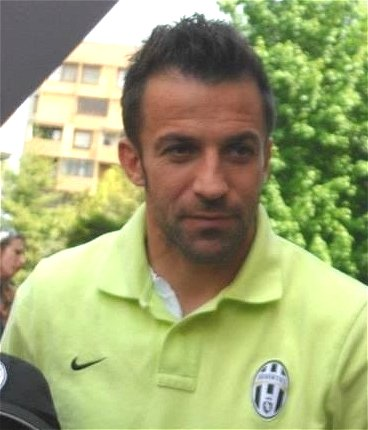
Del Piero before a match in April 2012

Juventus confirmed on 18 October 2011 that the 2011–12 Serie A would be Del Piero's last season with the club. The 2011–12 season under new manager Antonio Conte, his former Juventus teammate, saw Del Piero being used sparingly, and mainly as a substitute, because of the summer arrival of forward Mirko Vučinić from Roma. In the club's opening match of the season against Parma on 11 September, he assisted Simone Pepe's goal in an eventual 4–1 home win. Del Piero scored his first goal in the new Juventus Stadium on 24 January 2012, in a 3–0 win over Roma in the quarter-finals of the Coppa Italia. Later in the season, Del Piero stated that he was surprised at Juventus president Andrea Agnelli's announcement regarding the club's decision not to offer him a new contract.

In the second leg of Juventus's clash with Milan in the Coppa Italia semi-finals, Del Piero finished off a brilliant move by Juventus as they secured a 2–2 draw to progress to the final with a 4–3 aggregate win. On 25 March, Del Piero helped Juventus defeat Inter Milan by scoring the second goal of the match in a 2–0 victory, his first goal of the Serie A season. In Juventus' match against Lazio on 11 April, Del Piero replaced Vučinić in the second half, making his 700th appearance for Juventus, and then went on to score from a free kick to earn his side a 2–1 victory; the result also enabled Juventus to return to the top of the Serie A table.

On 13 May, Del Piero started Juventus's final league game of the season against Atalanta, marking the occasion and the victory of their 28th Serie A title by scoring a goal. Twenty-seven minutes into the match, Del Piero picked the ball up at the edge of the penalty box and placed a shot past Giorgio Frezzolini to make the score 2–0, helping Juventus to go undefeated in Serie A that season. He was substituted off after 59 minutes to an emotional response from both sets of players and supporters, as he made a lap of honour around the pitch. This was Alessandro Del Piero's final Serie A appearance for Juventus.

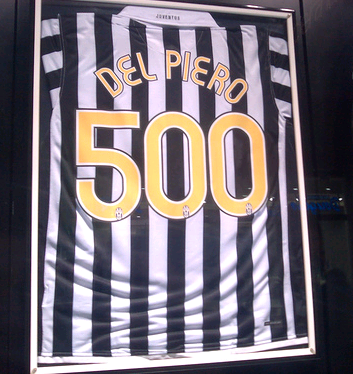
A commemorative shirt, celebrating Del Piero's 500th Juventus appearance

Del Piero's final match for Juventus was in the Coppa Italia Final on 20 May against Napoli, which ended in a 2–0 victory to the Neapolitans. Del Piero was substituted in the 67th minute for Vučinić as his Juventus career came to an end; he received a standing ovation from both the Juventus and Napoli fans. Following the game, he confirmed that after his 19-year spell with Juventus, he did not plan to retire. He then left the club and became a free agent. In total, Del Piero made a club record of 705 appearances for Juventus across all competitions, scoring a record 290 goals, and providing 134 assists in all competitions throughout his career with the club; he also scored 188 goals and provided 108 assists in 478 Serie A appearances with the Turin club, making him the third–highest assist provider of all time in Serie A history, after Totti and Roberto Baggio. In addition to these records, Del Piero is also Juventus's top scorer and second highest appearance holder in the UEFA Champions League, behind only Buffon, with 44 goals in 92 appearances; he is also the top scorer and appearance holder for Juventus in European Competitions, with 50 goals in 125 appearances, in International competitions, with 54 goals in 131 appearances, and in the Supercoppa Italiana, with 3 goals in 6 appearances. He is the club's top-scorer in Serie B, with 21 goals, and the club's second highest scorer in the Coppa Italia, with 25 goals, behind Pietro Anastasi. Alongside Giuseppe Signori and Alberto Gilardino, Del Piero is also the ninth highest all-time goalscorer in Serie A, and he is currently the joint all-time top scorer in the Supercoppa Italiana, alongside Samuel Eto'o, Andriy Shevchenko, and Carlos Tevez. As of May 2025, he is the joint nineteenth highest UEFA Champions League all-time goalscorer, with 42 goals.

Del Piero refused the board's offer to retire the No. 10 shirt in his honour, saying: "I've really had so much that I would never want it to be retired, this way, every child can dream one day of wearing it." On 30 June, Del Piero wrote an open letter to the Juventus fans thanking them for almost two decades of support, stating: "Above all what remains is the fans, you who are Juventus. That jersey that I loved and will always love, that I desired and respected ... From tomorrow I will no longer be a Juventus player, but I will always be one of you. Now a new adventure begins and I am as fired up as I was 19 summers ago."

=== Sydney FC ===
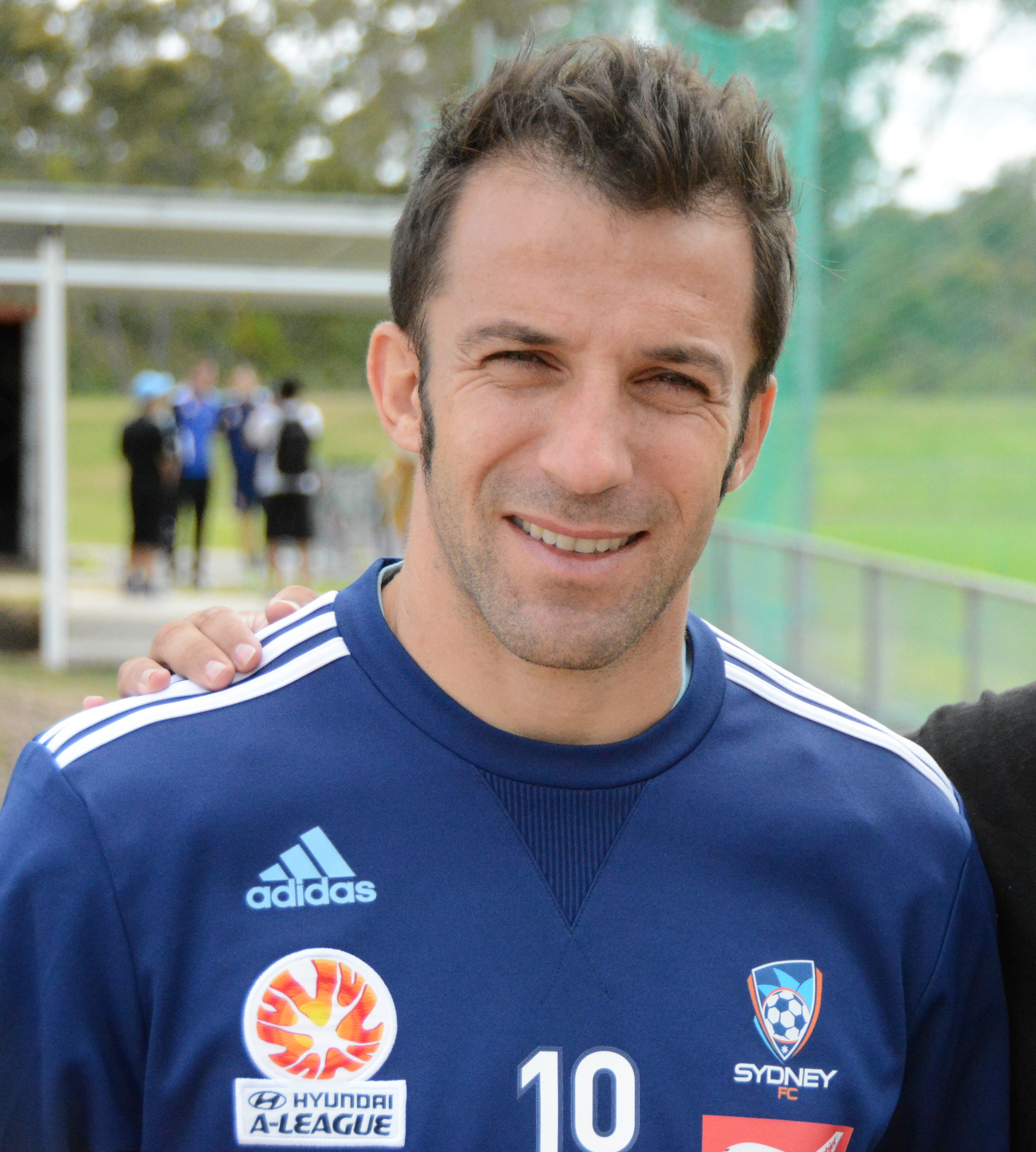
Del Piero with Sydney FC in 2014

On 5 September 2012, Del Piero signed a two-year deal with Sydney FC. He was paid approximately AU$3.5 million for each of his first two seasons, and therefore became the highest-paid footballer to ever play in Australia. Del Piero had been linked to Liverpool prior to signing for Sydney, but later revealed due to his memories of Heysel he would not have been able to move to the club.

Upon signing for Sydney FC, Del Piero said: "It's a special day for me. I am happy to announce that I just signed for two years for Sydney FC. This is a very big moment for me because I want to continue my career in a new part of the world where I can make a major contribution and help grow the game I love." After the announcement of the transfer to Sydney FC, Juventus wished good luck to their former captain. Francesco Totti and Filippo Inzaghi said they were saddened by his departure.

Sydney FC chairman Scott Barlow said: "The signing of Alessandro Del Piero is a big moment for this club and, we believe, a historic moment for football in Australia, I wouldn't like to go into the details of the contract, but this does represent the largest professional sporting contract in Australian history and the numbers that have been discussed aren't too far off the mark."

Football Federation Australia chief executive Ben Buckley said that this signing would be crucial for the growth of Australian Football, both economically and technically. Ian Crook, manager of Sydney FC, said he would build the forward set-up around the Italian, who would be given licence to pull the strings, adding: "We're not going to reinvent the wheel here. He's played 19 years for one of the biggest four or five clubs in the world, as a No. 10 or a No. 9. We're not going to change that." FIFA President Sepp Blatter sent his best wishes to Del Piero and his new club.

On 6 October 2012, Del Piero made his A-League debut with Sydney FC in a 2–0 away loss against Wellington Phoenix. Del Piero scored his first goal for the club from a free-kick in 3–2 loss to Newcastle Jets on 13 October, in his first home game for Sydney. The match against Newcastle featured hero-cam, which allowed the viewer to track Del Piero's movements with one camera throughout the game. On 20 October, Del Piero scored the winning goal against Western Sydney Wanderers FC (1–0), making history with the first goal in the first Sydney Derby.

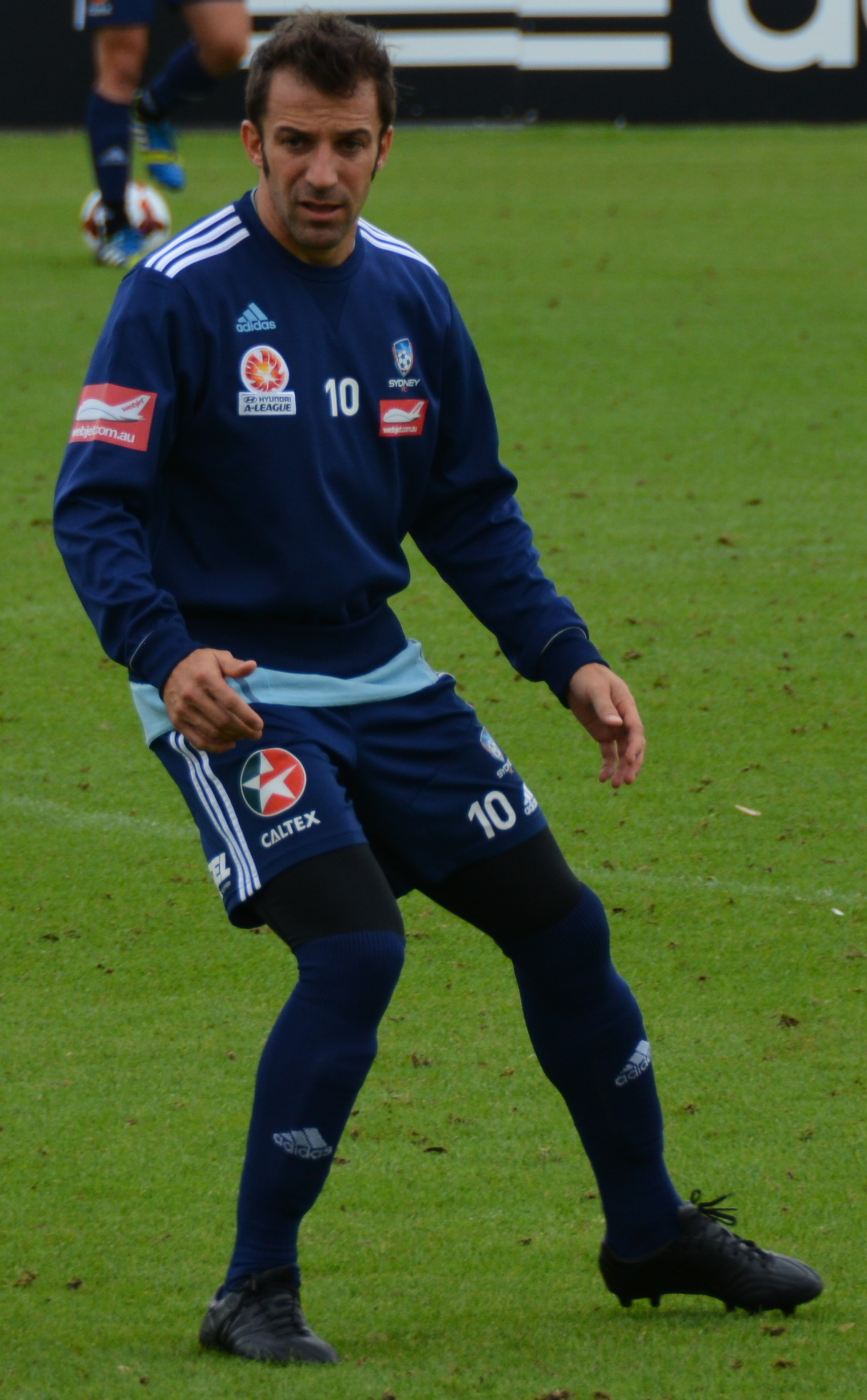
Del Piero training with Sydney FC in 2014

On 19 January 2013, Del Piero scored four goals and also provided one assist in Sydney's 7–1 win against Wellington Phoenix; this was the first time he had scored more than three goals in a single match, and after being substituted, the fans gave him a standing ovation. On 10 February, Del Piero broke the club's record for most goals in a single season, scoring his eleventh goal of the season in a 2–1 home win over Brisbane Roar. Despite his record-breaking tally of 14 goals in 24 appearances, Del Piero was unable to help Sydney qualify for the play-offs at the end of the season. On 21 February, Del Piero renewed his contract until 2014.

Del Piero was named Sydney's captain for their 2013–14 season. On 11 October 2013, Del Piero scored the opening goal of the 2013–14 A-League season, the game-winner in a 2–0 victory over Newcastle Jets, also setting up Joel Chianese's goal. Alessandro went on to score 10 goals in total for Sydney FC in the 2013–14 season, which earned him the Sydney FC Golden Boot; he helped the club qualify for the finals series, setting up both of his team's goals in the final match of the regular season on 13 April 2014, a 2–1 home win over Perth Glory, before being released of his contract at Sydney FC. His final match with Sydney came in a 2–1 loss to Melbourne Victory in an Elimination final at Docklands Stadium on 18 April, courtesy of Gui Finkler's injury time winner.

On Sunday 10 August 2014, Del Piero captained the Hyundai A-League All Stars against his club of almost 20 years, Juventus, in Sydney, in front of over 55,000 people at ANZ Stadium. Del Piero was substituted off at the 63rd minute of the match for David Williams, to a standing ovation.

In April 2015, Del Piero was named to Sydney FC's team of the decade and to the AFC team of the decade.

=== Delhi Dynamos ===
On 23 August 2014, it was reported that Delhi Dynamos, an Indian side that was set to play in the inaugural Indian Super League season, was in talks with Del Piero. His brother, Stefano Del Piero said, "During the last (few) weeks, we have received inquiries from several teams, not only from India but also from other countries. There is a lot of interest in Alessandro." On 28 August 2014, he officially signed for the Delhi-based outfit, signing a four-month deal. He reportedly is the highest paid player in the history of Indian football.

Del Piero made his debut for the Delhi Dynamos on 14 October in a 0–0 draw against Pune City, a side which featured his former Juventus teammate David Trezeguet. On 9 December, Del Piero scored his first and only Delhi Dynamos goal, netting directly from a free kick, in a 2–2 draw against Chennaiyin. Del Piero made 10 appearances throughout the season as Delhi finished in fifth place, failing to reach the play-offs by a single point.

=== Retirement ===
In October 2015, after almost a year without a club, Del Piero officially communicated his retirement from professional football, also stating his intention to pursue a coaching career.

== International career ==
=== 1995–1998: Euro 1996 and 1998 World Cup ===
Del Piero is currently Italy's joint fourth all-time leading scorer, along with Roberto Baggio, with 27 goals in 91 appearances, with two goals for Italy coming in twelve World Cup matches and one goal in thirteen European Championship matches; alongside Enrico Chiesa, he also holds the unique record for the most goals scored by an Italian international as a substitute (5). Del Piero initially played for the Italian U-21 team twelve times, scoring three goals, and was a member of the team that qualified for and later won the 1996 European Under-21 Championship, appearing in the quarter-finals. On 25 March 1995, Del Piero debuted under Arrigo Sacchi at the age of 20 in a 4–1 victory against Estonia in a Euro 1996 qualifying match. Del Piero scored his first goal for Italy on 15 November 1995 in a 4–0 victory against Lithuania in the same tournament.

His major tournament debut was at UEFA Euro 1996, where he made his only appearance in the first half of the team's 2–1 win in the opening group match against Russia, playing as a left-winger in midfield, wearing the number 14 shirt, before being substituted at half-time by Roberto Donadoni.

The next year, Del Piero was part of the Italy team that took part in the friendly "Tournoi de France" tournament from 3 to 11 June 1997 under Cesare Maldini. Del Piero scored two goals in a 3–3 draw against Brazil, and scored from a penalty against France in the 90th minute, finishing the tournament as top-scorer with 3 goals, although Italy finished in last place.

Del Piero competed with fan favourite Roberto Baggio for an attacking spot in the starting 11 during the 1998 FIFA World Cup, while struggling to recover from an injury suffered during the 1998 Champions League final with Juventus; Del Piero missed out on Italy's 2–2 opening draw against Chile, and was temporarily replaced by Baggio. He made his first World Cup appearance in the second group match, a 3–0 defeat of Cameroon, coming on for Baggio in the second half, wearing the number 10 shirt, and contributing to Christian Vieri's final goal. In the final group game against Austria, Del Piero won his first start, setting up Vieri's opening goal of the match from a free-kick as Italy won 2–1 to top their group and seal a passage into the next round, avoiding reigning champions Brazil; he was substituted by Baggio in the second half. Italy reached the quarter-finals after defeating Norway 1–0, as Del Piero started the match alongside Vieri once again, coming off for Enrico Chiesa in the 77th minute. Italy eventually fell to hosts and eventual champions France on penalty kicks, following a 0–0 draw; Del Piero was criticised for his performance and was substituted in the second half by Baggio once again.

=== 1998–2004: Euro 2000 runners-up and subsequent struggles ===
Del Piero with Francesco Totti celebrating a goal for Italy during Euro 2000

Del Piero was part of Dino Zoff's Italy's squad that reached the final of UEFA Euro 2000. Although he was primarily used as a substitute for either Francesco Totti or Stefano Fiore, Del Piero appeared in every match of the tournament, and he wore the number 10 shirt. On 11 June, Del Piero came on as a substitute for Fiore in the 30th minute in Italy's opening Group B 2–1 win against Turkey, hitting the cross-bar from a free-kick. In the final group game, Del Piero started the match and scored the winner with a notable goal against Sweden, taking it past two players before curling the ball into the top corner from outside the area with a left-footed strike; Del Piero also set up Luigi Di Biagio's opener from a corner. Del Piero made his second start of the tournament for Italy in their semi-final against co-hosts, Netherlands, which Italy won on penalties following a 0–0 draw after extra-time. In the final, he come on as a substitute in the second half and missed two gilt-edged chances in Italy's 2–1 loss to France in extra time, and was criticised by the Italian press.

Del Piero returned to the international scene in the 2002 FIFA World Cup under Giovanni Trapattoni after winning the scudetto with Juventus. He scored the decisive goal from a free kick against Hungary, which sealed Italy's qualification for the finals. Del Piero appeared as a substitute in Italy's opening win against Ecuador, wearing the captain's armband for part of the match. He instantly scored with a header against Mexico, after coming on as a substitute, an equalising goal which saved Italy from the ignominy of a first round exit in their final group match. The goal sent Italy through to the second round, where they were eliminated by a golden goal in a controversial match against co-hosts South Korea, a match during which Del Piero started alongside Totti and Vieri.

Del Piero took part in 6 of Italy's 2004 European Qualifying matches, scoring 5 goals, and was called up for the Italy squad that would participate in UEFA Euro 2004 in Portugal. Del Piero started all three matches, wearing the captain's armband in Italy's final win over Bulgaria, and was involved in Cassano's injury time match-winning goal, although Italy were eliminated in the first round on direct encounters, following a three-way five point tie with Sweden and Denmark.

=== 2004–2008: World Cup champion and post-World Cup ===
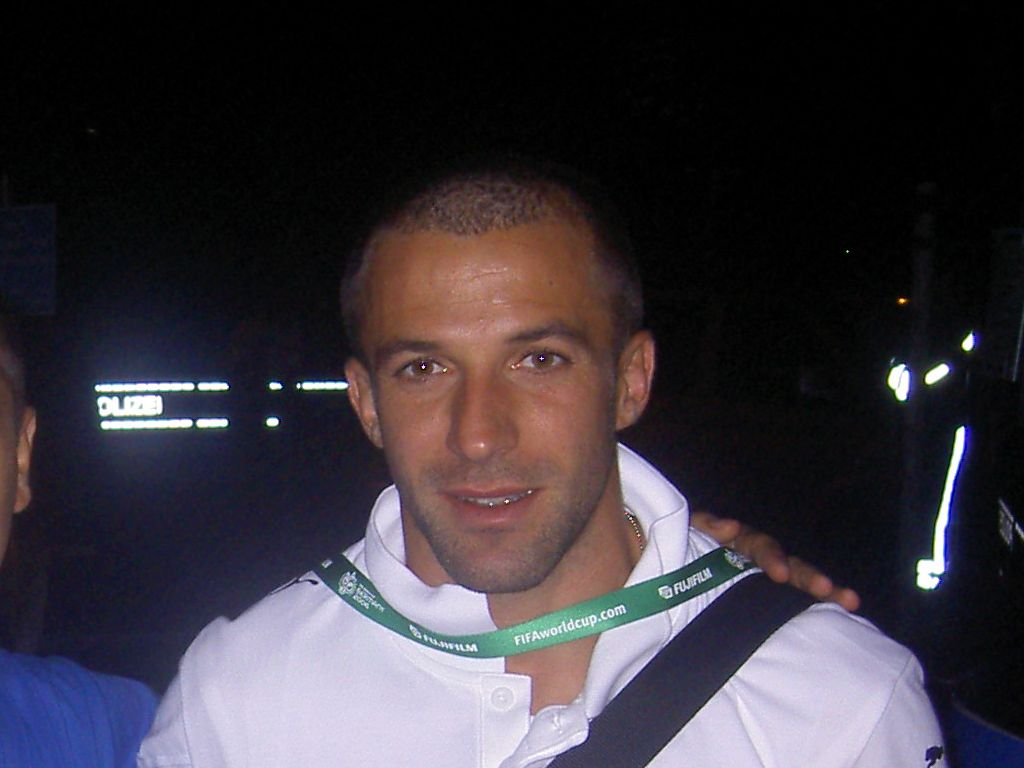
Del Piero after Italy's victorious 2006 World Cup semi-final against hosts Germany

Del Piero took part in the 2006 FIFA World Cup under manager Marcello Lippi, appearing in five matches, and two out of the three group stage matches; he made his first start of the competition in a 1–0 round of 16 win over Australia on 26 June. On 4 July, Del Piero entered as a substitute near the end of regulation and in the 121st minute scored Italy's second goal in a 2–0 semi-final win over host Germany. In the final against France, which ended 1–1 after extra time, Del Piero scored a penalty in the shootout as Italy won the tournament for the fourth time. He admitted afterwards that winning the World Cup was his childhood dream.

Del Piero has captained Italy seven times (including during UEFA Euro 2008). He also initially regularly wore the number 10 shirt, in particular under Maldini and Zoff, but later gave it to Totti after Euro 2000, and switched to the number 7 for the 2002 World Cup, as it was the first number he wore at the start of his career. Even though the number 10 shirt was vacated after Totti retired from the national team in July 2007, Del Piero denied any interest in taking back the number, saying he was satisfied with the number 7 jersey. In May, he was recalled by popular demand to Italy's UEFA Euro 2008 squad in Austria and Switzerland under manager Roberto Donadoni, after a nine-month absence from international duty, and thus became the second Italian player, after Paolo Maldini, to participate in seven major international tournaments (Euro 1996, 2000, 2004, 2008; World Cup 1998, 2002, 2006).

Although Del Piero was mostly on the substitutes' bench at Euro 2008, he started in Italy's second group match against Romania as the squad's captain. In the first group match against the Dutch, he came on for the under-performing Antonio Di Natale and made an immediate impact, including several efforts on goal; however, he could not prevent Italy from losing 3–0. Italy qualified through the group stage in second-place behind the Netherlands, eliminating Romania and France. In the quarter-final against eventual champions Spain, Del Piero made a substitute appearance during extra-time, and with the game ending in a 0–0 draw, it was decided by a penalty shootout in which Spain won 4–2.

On 20 August 2008, Del Piero won his 90th cap for Italy in friendly against Austria under Lippi, becoming only the fifth Italy player to reach this landmark at the time. Despite announcing his intention to carry on playing until the age of 40, he was excluded from Lippi's 2010 FIFA World Cup squad. Del Piero's final appearance for Italy came in a 2–0 win against Georgia in a 2010 FIFA World Cup qualifier on 10 September 2008; he came on for Di Natale in the 56th minute and later set up Daniele De Rossi's second goal of the match.

In 2013, the Italy national team coach at the time, Cesare Prandelli, stated that he would consider calling Del Piero up for the 2014 World Cup, although he was ultimately excluded from the Italian squad that participated at the tournament in Brazil.

== Player profile ==
=== Style of play ===
"[Del Piero] is different to Zinedine Zidane. He likes to play, he feels it in his soul. Between him and the Frenchman, I choose him."

— Diego Maradona, 2012

Due to his creative style of play, eye for goal, flair, and technical skill, Del Piero was known as a "fantasista" in Italy. His hard-working playing style was regarded by critics as creative in attacking, assisting many goals as well as scoring himself, as opposed to just "goal poaching". Because of his technical characteristics, link-up play, and ability at one–twos, Del Piero usually played as a supporting-striker, which was his preferred role, although he was a tactically versatile forward, with good movement and clinical finishing, who was capable of playing anywhere along the front line, and who also established himself as a prolific goalscorer throughout his career.

Del Piero was capable of playing in several offensive positions, being occasionally deployed between the midfield and the strikers as a playmaking attacking midfielder, known in Italy as the trequartista position, due to his vision, passing range, ball control, dribbling ability (in particular in one on one situations) and creativity, although he often stated that this was not his preferred position. As such, Del Piero's former Juventus teammate and manager Didier Deschamps described him as a "nine and a half" in 2006, a description that Michel Platini had previously also used to describe Roberto Baggio, to indicate that Del Piero's favoured role was somewhere between that of a striker (who traditionally wore the number nine shirt) and an attacking midfielder (who traditionally wore the number ten shirt), namely that of a second striker. In this free role, he was also often given licence to drift onto the wings and cut inside to shoot on goal with his stronger right foot. In addition to his technical, offensive, and creative qualities, Del Piero was known for his defensive work-rate, and his crossing accuracy, as well as his ability to use either foot.

=== Position and reception ===
Del Piero is regarded as one of the best players of his generation, and as one of the best Italian players of all time; he is also considered to be Juventus's greatest player ever. A precocious talent, in his youth, Del Piero played in the "trident-attack" of Lippi's 4–3–3 formation, along with veterans Vialli, Baggio, and Ravanelli, as a striker, or more frequently as an outside forward on the left wing. With the arrival of Zidane in the advanced midfield playmaking role, Juventus's formation changed to a 4–4–2 system, and Del Piero partnered alongside a more offensive striker up front, such as Christian Vieri and subsequently Inzaghi, as either a supporting forward or as an out-and-out striker. After losing some of his explosive pace, speed of execution, flair, and agility following his injury in 1998, Del Piero performed a muscle strengthening regime, and he took on a more creative role, in combination with playmaker Zidane, functioning in a free position, just in front of the attacking midfielder and behind the main striker Inzaghi, under Ancelotti, in the club's 3–4–1–2 formation; although he was accused by some in the media of not living up to his potential following his injury, due to his decrease in goalscoring, he successfully adapted to his new creative attacking role as an assist provider.

As Juventus's playing style continued to change during Lippi's second stint with Juventus starting in 2001, Del Piero partnered with Zidane's replacement, Nedvěd, in a free creative role in front of the midfield, or occasionally on the left flank, as a supporting striker in a fluid 4–4–2 formation, with Trezeguet upfront; he subsequently continued to play a similar role under Capello and later managers, and was even occasionally used in a more offensive role as a main striker, although he became increasingly deployed as a substitute due to his advancing age. Del Piero was also employed occasionally as a winger in a 4–4–2 formation throughout his career, in particular during his time under Sacchi with the Italy national football team.

Regarding the contrast between Del Piero's world–class performances in his youth and his initial struggle to replicate the heights he achieved prior to his career–threatening injury in 1998, Roberto Beccantini noted in a Treccani profile on Del Piero: "There were two Del Pieros: one was the unmatchable fantasista, capable of scoring unforgettable goals and producing extraordinary assists; the other is the forward that, after Zeman's allegations of his use of performing enhancing drugs and the serious injury he suffered to his left knee on 8 November 1998 in Udine, struggled to find himself and went from his 21 league goals of the 1997–98 season, a personal record, to only one goal in open play (plus 8 penalties scored) during the 1999–2000 season." He also said that Del Piero struggled to replicate his club performances with Juventus at international level with Italy, in particular in major tournaments. Despite his injury struggles, Del Piero also stood out for his longevity throughout his career, and drew praise in the media for his consistent goalscoring and the high–level of performance he managed to maintain even into his late 30s. In addition to his talent and footballing abilities, Del Piero also drew praise from pundits throughout his career for his leadership with Juventus, and served as the team's captain despite his shy personality; he also drew acclaim in the media for his fair play and correct behaviour on the pitch.

=== Set pieces ===
"Del Piero [is the best Italian player], we're the same age and I've followed his whole career."

— Ryan Giggs, 2012

Del Piero was a free kick and penalty kick (62 goals from penalties) specialist. He is the third highest scorer of penalties in Serie A in Serie A history, scoring 50 times out of 61 attempts, behind only Francesco Totti and Roberto Baggio. Del Piero's unique free kick technique was usually characterised by a curling strike which rose high over the wall, and then suddenly dropped into the top corner of the goal; he attributes his ability on set pieces to the time spent studying Roberto Baggio in training during their time together at Juventus, and was also influenced by the free kick technique of one of his idols, Platini. Indeed, in his early years with the Turin club, Del Piero's free kick technique was compared to that of the Frenchman, as he preferred to strike the ball from a distance of around 20 metres from the goal, with a direct kick, rather than having it touched by a teammate first. Del Piero is currently the

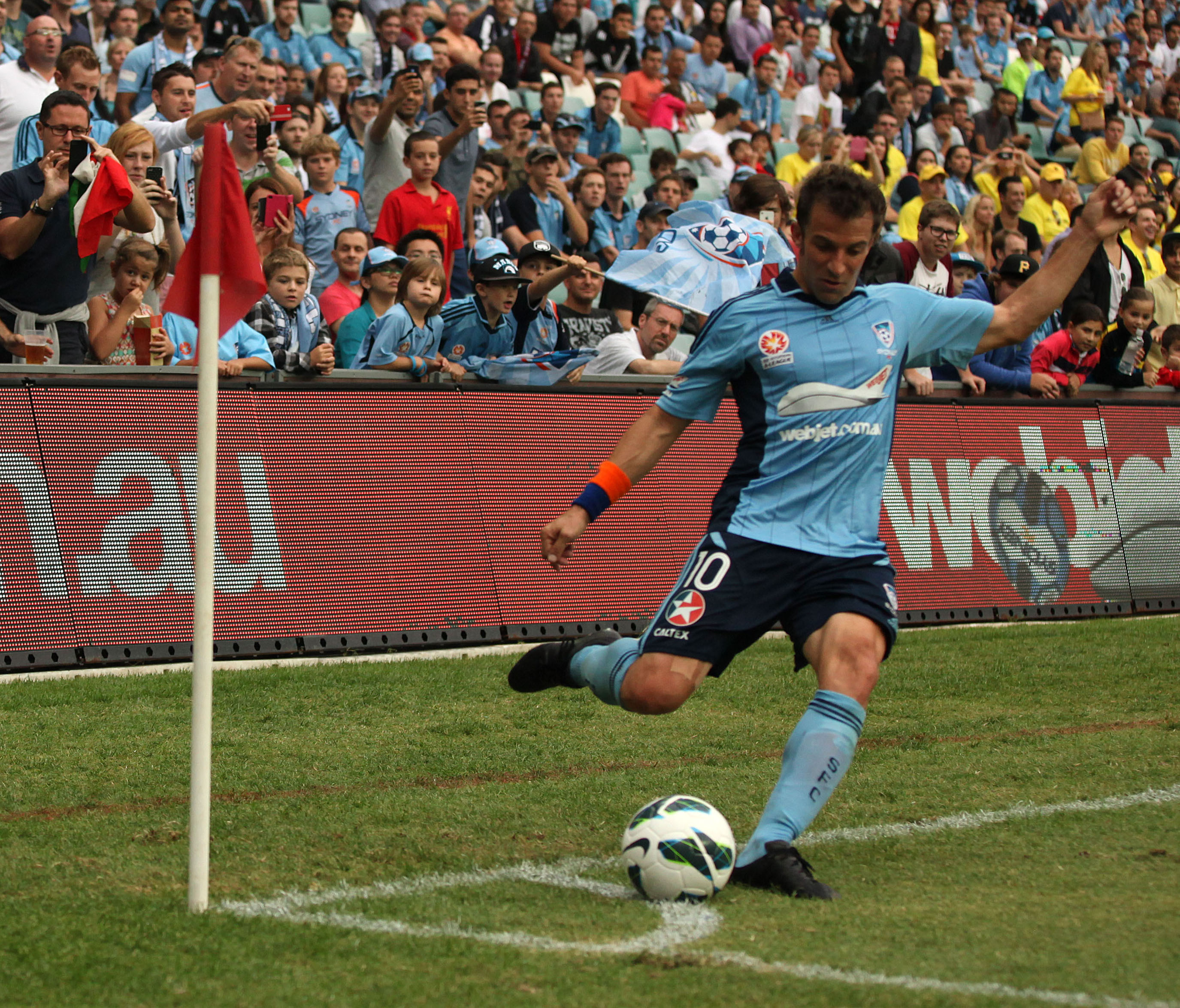
Del Piero taking a corner kick.

Italian all-time top scorer from free kicks in all competitions (52 goals: 46 goals at club level, 6 goals with the Italy national team). He is also the third all-time highest goalscorer of free kicks in Serie A, with 22 goals, behind only Andrea Pirlo and Siniša Mihajlović.

=== "Del Piero Goal and Zone" ===
The football media refer to a "Del Piero Goal" (Gol alla Del Piero in Italian), a style of scoring involving a dribbling approach from the flank, followed by a precise, curling lob into the far top corner of the goal, from outside the area, with a player's stronger foot after cutting into the centre; as such, this area of the pitch also became known as the "Del Piero Zone" in the media (Zona Del Piero in Italian). This association came about as Del Piero had scored several goals in this manner, both in open play and from set-pieces, with his right foot after cutting in from the left flank, during his first two seasons under Lippi, in particular during Juventus's victorious 1995–96 Champions League campaign; Del Piero continued to score similar goals throughout his career, and the "Del Piero Goal" label has also been used to describe similar goals by other players.

=== Goal celebrations ===
In his later career, after scoring a goal, Del Piero often celebrated by running to the touchline in front of the fans with his arms out-stretched, and sticking out his tongue, in a similar manner to Michael Jordan, also frequently leaping into the air with a raised fist towards the sky, or sliding onto his knees whilst passionately chanting to the crowd. Del Piero also performed a back-flip goal celebration in a 2008 UEFA Champions League match against Zenit, and he also pointed up at the sky after scoring on certain occasions, to dedicate a goal to his late father, such as when he scored against Bari during the 2000–01 season, and Mexico at the 2002 World Cup.

== Outside football ==
=== Personal life ===
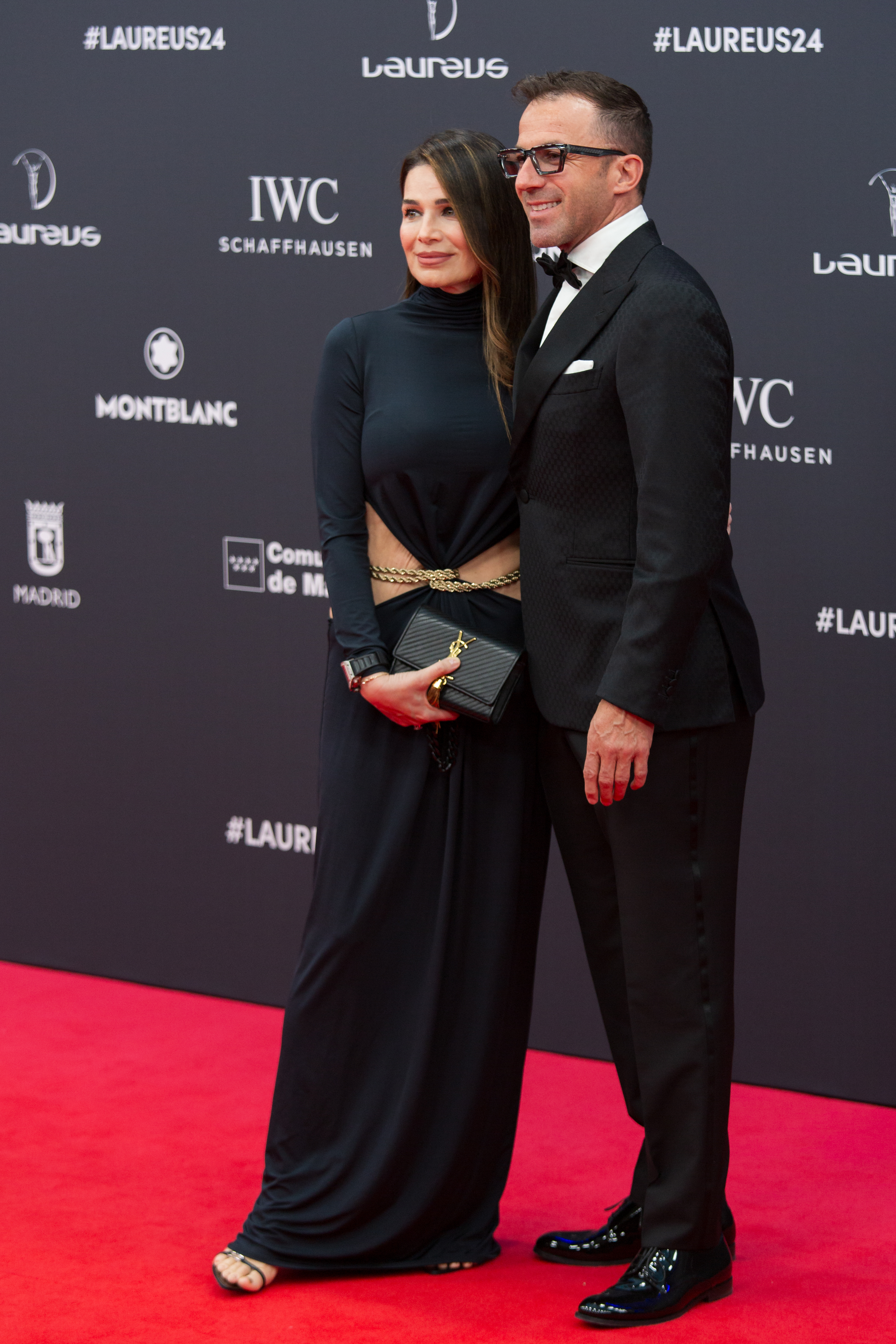
Del Piero and his wife Sonia at the 25th Laureus World Sports Awards

Del Piero is married to Sonia Amoruso and the two have been together since 1999 and married in 2005. They have three children, born in 2007, 2009, and 2010.

When the Olympic Flame for the 2006 Winter Olympics passed through Turin, Del Piero was a torchbearer. He has an interest in sports outside of football, particularly basketball, and in turn has gained fans outside of football; sport icons such as NBA star Steve Nash and cyclist Eddy Merckx have stated that they are fans of Del Piero.

Del Piero has a keen interest in music. He has recorded some of his own albums. Along with Marco Materazzi, Del Piero appeared on stage at a Rolling Stones show in Milan shortly after Italy's World Cup win. He is a good friend of musician and singer Noel Gallagher and a fan of his band Oasis; Del Piero appears in the Oasis video "Lord Don't Slow Me Down". One of Del Piero's inspirations as a youngster was Japanese football manga Captain Tsubasa.

In 2012, Del Piero participated in the Save the Dream project against corruption in the sport and spoke about this at Sorbonne during the Sport Integrity Symposium.

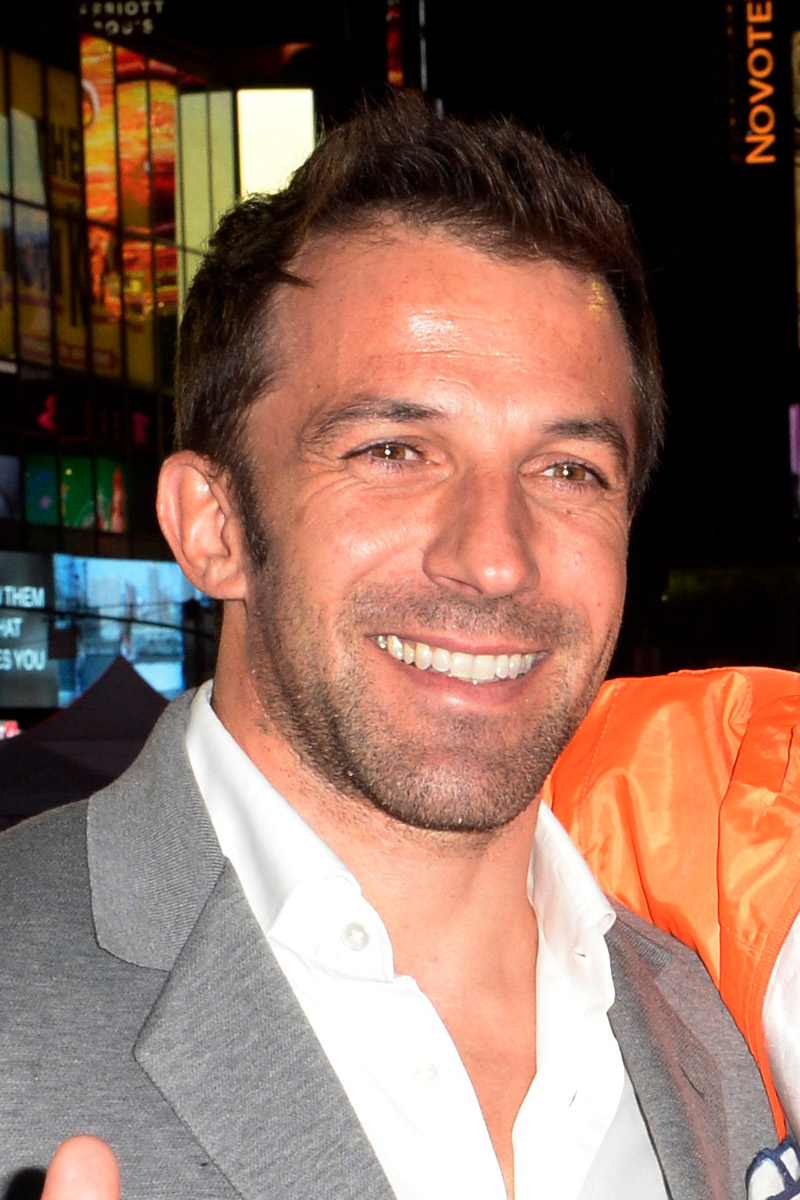
Del Piero in 2015

Since March 2018, Del Piero has been running an Italian restaurant in Los Angeles called No.10, representing his jersey No. 10.

In 2019, Del Piero revealed he was the part-owner of American lower division club LA 10 FC of the United Premier Soccer League, with the club's name inspired by his iconic number 10 jersey and the club's colours of black-and-white referencing his former club Juventus.

=== Charity work ===
Del Piero has promoted and supported a number of charities. In 1998, he donated 5.2 million lire to Fondazione Bambini in Emergenza for abandoned children and victims of AIDS by auctioning his Juventus shirt. In 2001, he was ambassador for Un gol per la ricerca, a cancer-research project. In 2006, he was AIRC testimonial for the cancer research and in recognition of this, he has received from the President of Italy a prize of Believe in Research. In 2008, he participated in a golf tournament organized by the foundation of Gianluca Vialli and Massimo Mauro for Amyotrophic lateral sclerosis research. In 2009, he played a friendly match at the Stadio Olimpico di Torino with his team Ale 10+; the proceeds (€180,000) were donated to solidarity projects.

In 2010, Del Piero auctioned off his Juventus shirt number 10 for the foundation Un Campo per L'Aquila. On 1 April 2011, he launched the ale10friendsforjapan project, which he designed to help Japanese earthquake victims creating a website to sell T-shirts and collecting $303,880. In 2011, he participated in the golf tournament Fondazione Sant'Anna Cup – Crescere insieme for the neonatal intensive care unit of the hospital Sant'Anna. On 21 July 2012, he played a friendly match at Kashima Stadium organized by J. League (Del Piero scored one goal and he left the field with a standing ovation); the collection was donated to the Japanese earthquake victims of 2011.

Del Piero was testimonial of ADISCO, for the donation of umbilical cord blood, and testimonial of 1GOAL for the education of poor children. In 2015, in honour of Formula One World Champion Ayrton Senna, Del Piero facilitated and inaugurated the AYRTON exhibition in Turin, open between February and May 2015. The exhibition is curated by, and with tickets proceeds going to, the Instituto Ayrton Senna charity.

=== TV, games, and publicity ===
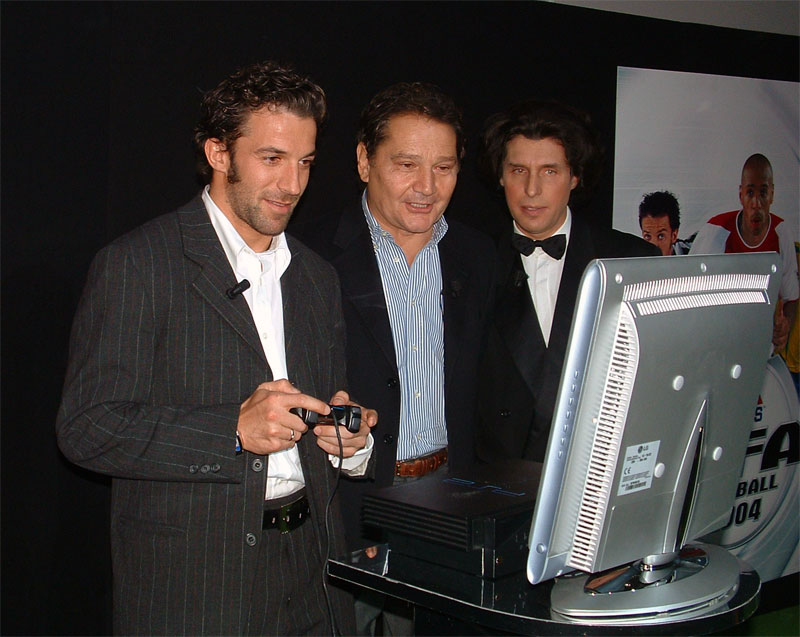
Del Piero during the Italian presentation of FIFA 2004

Del Piero has featured in various advertisements and is under contract with German sports equipment manufacturer Adidas, Uliveto water, Fiat, Japanese motorbike company Suzuki, Pepsi, Bliss, Cepu, Walt Disney, and Upper Deck.

In 2006, Del Piero appeared in a television commercial for the Japanese motor scooter Suzuki Burgman together with the sports agent Andreas Goller. He is also known for his sense of humour and is a popular guest at Italian comedy shows such as Paperissima and Striscia la notizia. He featured in the film L'allenatore nel pallone 2 and in the show La sai l'ultima di Totti, a series of short comedy sketches created by his friend and Roma captain Francesco Totti.

Del Piero was featured on the cover of EA Sports FIFA Football 2004 video game, alongside Thierry Henry and Ronaldinho, and on the cover of the Italian edition of the FIFA World Cup 2006 video game. He was also named in the Ultimate Team Legends in FIFA 17. He was one of the two stars featured on the cover of the Italian version of PES 2010 video game, the other being Barcelona's Lionel Messi.

In 2015, Del Piero joined Sky Sport Italia as a pundit. In 2017, he appeared in the Netflix docu-series called First Team: Juventus. In 2018, Konami announced that Del Piero would feature in their football video game Pro Evolution Soccer 2019 as one of the new myClub Legends. Starting in 2021, Del Piero joined ESPN as a football analyst for ESPN FC and UEFA Euro 2020.

== Career statistics ==
=== Club ===
Appearances and goals by club, season and competition
Club	Season	League			National cup		Continental		Other		Total	
Club	Season	Division	Apps	Goals	Apps	Goals	Apps	Goals	Apps	Goals	Apps	Goals
Padova	1991–92	Serie B	4	0	0	0	—		—		4	0
Padova	1992–93	Serie B	10	1	0	0	—		—		10	1
Padova	Total		14	1	0	0	—		—		14	1
Juventus	1993–94	Serie A	11	5	1	0	2 (Note: Appearances in UEFA Cup)	0	—		14	5
Juventus	1994–95	Serie A	29	8	10	1	11	2	—		50	11
Juventus	1995–96	Serie A	29	6	2	1	11 (Note: Appearances in UEFA Champions League)	6	1 (Note: Appearance in Supercoppa Italiana)	0	43	13
Juventus	1996–97	Serie A	22	8	4	0	6	4	3 (Note: Two appearances and two goals in UEFA Super Cup, one appearance and one goal in Intercontinental Cup)	3	35	15
Juventus	1997–98	Serie A	32	21	4	1	10	10	1	0	47	32
Juventus	1998–99	Serie A	8	2	1	0	4	0	1	1	14	3
Juventus	1999–2000	Serie A	34	9	2	1	9 (Note: Three appearances and one goal in UEFA Intertoto Cup, six appearances and one goal in UEFA Cup)	2	—		45	12
Juventus	2000–01	Serie A	25	9	2	0	6	0	—		33	9
Juventus	2001–02	Serie A	32	16	4	1	10	4	—		46	21
Juventus	2002–03	Serie A	24	16	0	0	13	5	1	2	38	23
Juventus	2003–04	Serie A	22	8	4	3	4	3	1	0	31	14
Juventus	2004–05	Serie A	30	14	1	0	10	3	—		41	17
Juventus	2005–06	Serie A	33	12	4	5	7	3	1	0	45	20
Juventus	2006–07	Serie B	35	20	2	3	—		—		37	23
Juventus	2007–08	Serie A	37	21	4	3	—		—		41	24
Juventus	2008–09	Serie A	31	13	3	2	9	6	—		43	21
Juventus	2009–10	Serie A	23	9	1	2	5 (Note: Two appearances in UEFA Champions League, three appearances in UEFA Europa League)	0	—		29	11
Juventus	2010–11	Serie A	33	8	2	0	10 (Note: Appearances in UEFA Europa League)	3	—		45	11
Juventus	2011–12	Serie A	23	3	5	2	—		—		28	5
Juventus	Total		513	208	56	25	127	51	9	6	705	290
Sydney FC	2012–13	A-League	24	14	—		—		—		24	14
Sydney FC	2013–14	A-League	24	10	—		—		—		24	10
Sydney FC	Total		48	24	—		—		—		48	24
Delhi Dynamos	2014	Indian Super League	10	1	—		—		—		10	1
Career total			585	234	56	25	127	51	9	6	777	316

=== International ===
Appearances and goals by national team and year
National team	Year	Apps	Goals
Italy	1995	7	1
Italy	1996	4	2
Italy	1997	6	4
Italy	1998	8	3
Italy	1999	2	0
Italy	2000	13	4
Italy	2001	6	3
Italy	2002	11	5
Italy	2003	4	2
Italy	2004	6	1
Italy	2005	4	0
Italy	2006	9	2
Italy	2007	5	0
Italy	2008	6	0
Total		91	27

Scores and results list Italy's goal tally first, score column indicates score after each Del Piero goal.

List of international goals scored by Alessandro Del Piero
No.	Date	Venue	Opponent	Score	Result	Competition
1	15 November 1995	Stadio Giglio, Reggio Emilia, Italy	Lithuania	1–0	4–0	UEFA Euro 1996 qualifying
2	24 January 1996	Stadio Libero Liberati, Terni, Italy	Wales	1–0	3–0	Friendly
3	29 May 1996	Stadio Giovanni Zini, Cremona, Italy	Belgium	1–2	2–2	Friendly
4	22 January 1997	Stadio Renzo Barbera, Palermo, Italy	Northern Ireland	2–0	2–0	Friendly
5	8 June 1997	Stade de Gerland, Lyon, France	Brazil	1–0	3–3	1997 Tournoi de France
6	8 June 1997	Stade de Gerland, Lyon, France	Brazil	3–1	3–3	1997 Tournoi de France
7	11 June 1997	Parc des Princes, Paris, France	France	2–2	2–2	1997 Tournoi de France
8	28 January 1998	Stadio Angelo Massimino, Catania, Italy	Slovakia	2–0	3–0	Friendly
9	10 October 1998	Stadio Friuli, Udine, Italy	Switzerland	1–0	2–0	UEFA Euro 2000 qualifying
10	10 October 1998	Stadio Friuli, Udine, Italy	Switzerland	2–0	2–0	UEFA Euro 2000 qualifying
11	23 February 2000	Stadio Renzo Barbera, Palermo, Italy	Sweden	1–0	1–0	Friendly
12	19 June 2000	Philips Stadion, Eindhoven, Netherlands	Sweden	2–1	2–1	UEFA Euro 2000
13	11 October 2000	Stadio del Conero, Ancona, Italy	Georgia	1–0	2–0	2002 FIFA World Cup qualification
14	11 October 2000	Stadio del Conero, Ancona, Italy	Georgia	2–0	2–0	2002 FIFA World Cup qualification
15	28 March 2001	Stadio Nereo Rocco, Trieste, Italy	Lithuania	2–0	4–0	2002 FIFA World Cup qualification
16	28 March 2001	Stadio Nereo Rocco, Trieste, Italy	Lithuania	4–0	4–0	2002 FIFA World Cup qualification
17	6 October 2001	Stadio Ennio Tardini, Parma, Italy	Hungary	1–0	1–0	2002 FIFA World Cup qualification
18	13 February 2002	Stadio Angelo Massimino, Catania, Italy	United States	1–0	1–0	Friendly
19	13 June 2002	Ōita Stadium, Ōita, Japan	Mexico	1–1	1–1	2002 FIFA World Cup
20	7 September 2002	Tofiq Bahramov Stadium, Baku, Azerbaijan	Azerbaijan	2–0	2–0	UEFA Euro 2004 qualifying
21	12 October 2002	Stadio San Paolo, Naples, Italy	FR Yugoslavia	1–1	1–1	UEFA Euro 2004 qualifying
22	16 October 2002	Millennium Stadium, Cardiff, Wales	Wales	1–1	1–2	UEFA Euro 2004 qualifying
23	11 June 2003	Helsinki Olympic Stadium, Helsinki, Finland	Finland	2–0	2–0	UEFA Euro 2004 qualifying
24	6 September 2003	Stadio Giuseppe Meazza, Milan, Italy	Wales	4–0	4–0	UEFA Euro 2004 qualifying
25	8 September 2004	Stadionul Republican, Chişinău, Moldova	Moldova	1– 0	1–0	2006 FIFA World Cup qualification
26	1 March 2006	Stadio Artemio Franchi, Firenze, Italy	Germany	4–0	4–1	Friendly
27	4 July 2006	Westfalenstadion, Dortmund, Germany	Germany	2–0	2–0	2006 FIFA World Cup

=== Records ===
- All-time appearances for Juventus in all competitions (705 appearances)
- Second most appearances for Juventus in Serie A (478 appearances)
- Second most appearances for Juventus in Italian League matches (includes Serie A and Serie B) (513 appearances)
- Most appearances for Juventus in the Supercoppa Italiana (8 appearances as of 13 August 2017)
- All-time leading scorer for Juventus (290 goals: 186 goals in open play, 62 goals from penalties, 42 goals from free-kicks)
- All-time decisive goals holder for Juventus (135)
- Second most minutes played holder for Juventus (48,363)
- Second most appearances for Juventus in the Supercoppa Italiana (6 appearances)
- Second most appearances for Juventus in the UEFA Champions League (92 appearances)
- Second most appearances for Juventus in UEFA club competitions (124 appearances)
- Most appearances for Juventus in international club competitions (130 appearances)
- Second most goals scored in the Supercoppa Italiana, alongside Samuel Eto'o, Andriy Shevchenko, and Carlos Tevez (3)
- Most goals scored in a single season by a Sydney FC player (14)
- Third highest goalscorer from penalties in Serie A (50)
- Third highest goalscorer from free kicks in Serie A (22)
- Italian all-time top scorer from free kicks in all competitions (52 goals: 46 goals at club level, 6 goals with the Italy national team).
- Italian player with the most seasons with 10 goals or more across all club competitions (17 seasons)
- Most goals scored by an Italian international as a substitute (5)
- Joint fourth highest goalscorer for Italy (27 goals, alongside Roberto Baggio)

== Honours ==
Juventus Primavera

- Campionato Nazionale Primavera: 1993–94
- Torneo di Viareggio: 1994

Juventus

- Serie A: 1994–95, 1996–97, 1997–98, 2001–02, 2002–03, 2011–12 (Note: Not including the 2004–05 and 2005–06 titles, which were revoked following the Calciopoli scandal.)
- Serie B: 2006–07
- Coppa Italia: 1994–95
- Supercoppa Italiana: 1995, 1997, 2002, 2003
- UEFA Champions League: 1995–96; runner-up: 1996–97, 1997–98, 2002–03
- UEFA Intertoto Cup: 1999
- UEFA Super Cup: 1996
- Intercontinental Cup: 1996

Italy

- FIFA World Cup: 2006
- UEFA European Championship runner-up: 2000

Individual

- 1996 Intercontinental Cup MVP Award
- 1997 Tournoi de France top scorer (3 goals)
- 1997–98 UEFA Champions League top scorer (10 goals)
- 1999–00 Serie A top assist provider
- 2005–06 Coppa Italia top scorer (5 goals)
- 2006–07 Serie B top scorer (20 goals)
- Capocannoniere: 2007–08 (21 goals)
- ESM Team of the Season: 1995–96, 1996–97, 1997–98
- Bravo Award: 1996
- Serie A Italian Footballer of the Year: 1998, 2008
- Serie A Most Loved Player: 2001, 2008
- FIFA 100
- UEFA Golden Jubilee Poll: 49th place
- Giuseppe Prisco National Award: 2006
- Piedmontese Sportsman of the Year: 2006
- Special Prize Gentleman Silver Cup: 2006
- San Siro Gentleman Award Serie A: 2006
- Golden Foot Award: 2007
- Telegatto-Best Sportsman: 2007
- AFS Top-100 Players of All-Time – #60: 2007
- Serie A Goalscorer of the Year: 2008
- Premio Nazionale Carriera Esemplare "Gaetano Scirea": 2008
- Pallone d'Argento: 2008–09
- International Award for Sport and Civility-Ambassador of Sports: 2009
- Sportsman of the Year Golden Award: 2010
- Globe Soccer Career Award: 2011
- Novara Fair Play Award: 2011
- AIC Lifetime Achievement Award: 2011
- A-League goal of the season: 2012–13
- Sydney FC Golden Boot: 2013, 2014
- PFA Team of the Season: 2013
- Sydney FC Player of the Year Award: 2013
- Sydney FC Members Award: 2013
- A-League All Stars Game: 2014
- AFC Team of the Decade: 2015
- Sydney FC Team of the Decade: 2015
- Sydney FC Hall of Fame: 2015
- Italian Football Hall of Fame: 2017
- Juventus Greatest XI of All Time: 2017
- Juventus FC Hall of Fame: 2025
- IFFHS Legends

Orders

5th Class/Knight: Cavaliere Ordine al Merito della Repubblica Italiana: 2000

4th Class/Officer: Ufficiale Ordine al Merito della Repubblica Italiana: 2006

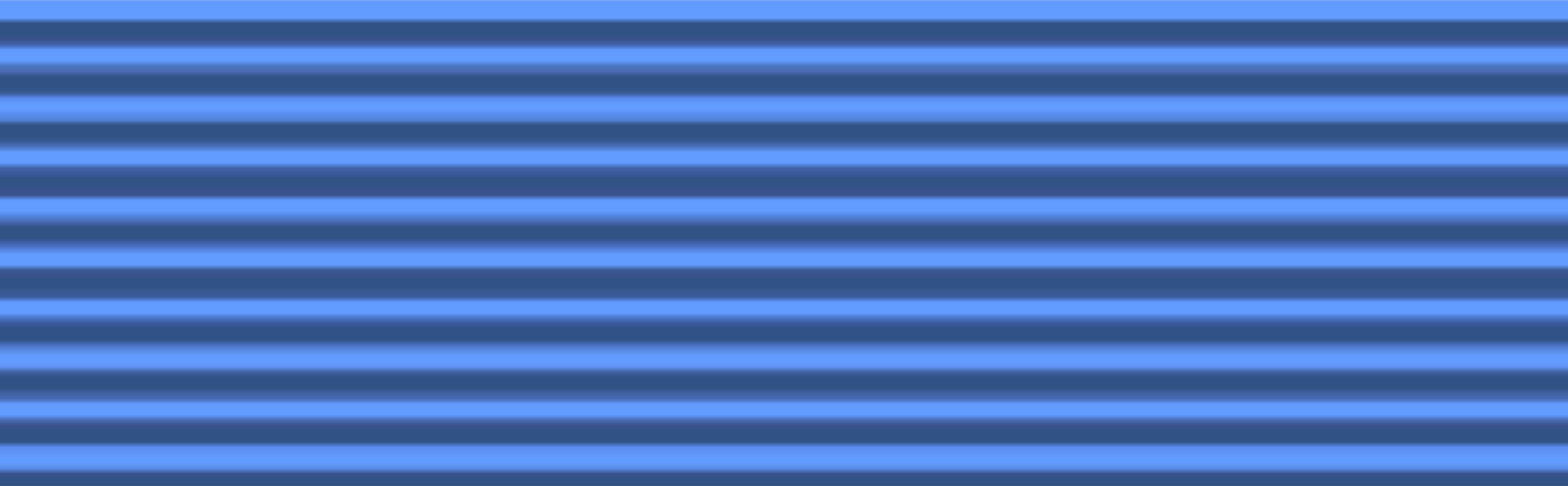

CONI: Golden Collar of Sports Merit: 2006

== Bibliography ==
- Refini, Maurizio (1998). Il campione. Alessandro Del Piero l'aquila con i piedi per terra [The champion. Alessandro Del Piero, the eagle with his feet on the ground] (in Italian). Limina. ISBN 88-86713-39-8.
- Giansanti, Gianni (2002). Semplicemente Del Piero [Simply Del Piero] (in Italian). Logos. ISBN 88-7940-175-0.
- Civati, Giuseppe (2004). Il segreto di Alex [Alex's secret] (in Italian). Limina. ISBN 88-88551-94-8.
- Franzelli, Marco (2006). Lo sberleffo di Godot. Il ritorno di Alessandro Del Piero [Godot's grimace. The return of Alessandro Del Piero] (in Italian). Limina. ISBN 88-6041-015-0.
- Bernardi, Bruno (2006). Pinturicchio. La favola di Alessandro Del Piero [Pincuricchio. The fable of Alessandro Del Piero] (in Italian). Graphot. ISBN 88-89509-29-5.
- Del Piero, Alessandro (2007). 10+ Il Mio Mondo in un Numero [10+ My World in a Number] (in Italian). Mondadori. ISBN 978-88-04-55986-3.
- Savino, Roberto (2011). Alex Del Piero. Minuto per minuto [Alex Del Piero. Minute by minute] (in Italian). Castelvecchi. ISBN 978-88-7615-577-2.
- Del Piero, Alessandro (2012). Giochiamo ancora [Let's play some more] (in Italian). Mondadori. ISBN 978-88-04-62115-7.
- Bartolomeo, Ruggiero (2012). GeniAle. L'album di Alessandro Del Piero [Ingenious. The album of Alessandro Del Piero] (in Italian). Libreria Sportiva Eraclea. ISBN 978-88-88771-36-6.
- Del Piero, Alessandro (2018). Detto tra noi [Between ourselves] (in Italian). Mondadori. ISBN 978-88-04-70701-1.
