= Alessandro Zoppetti =

Italian footballer (born 1979)

Personal information
- Date of birth: 28 March 1979 (age 47)
- Place of birth: Casalpusterlengo, Italy
- Height: 1.86 m (6 ft 1 in)
- Position: Defender

Youth career
- Cremonese

Senior career*
Years	Team	Apps	(Gls)
1997–2000	Cremonese	47	(0)
2000–2005	Reggina	14	(0)
2001	→ Pescara (loan)	9	(1)
2002–2003	→ Lecce (loan)	7	(0)
2003	→ Salernitana (loan)	17	(1)
2003–2004	→ Ascoli (loan)	12	(0)
2004	→ Catania (loan)	18	(0)
2004–2005	→ Treviso (loan)	28	(0)
2005–2007	Pescara	65	(1)
2007–2008	Pisa	27	(1)
2008–2010	Perugia	42	(0)
2010–2012	Giulianova	46	(0)
2012–2013	Pergolettese		
2013–2014	Sancolombano	9	(0)

International career
1998–2000	Italy U20	6	(0)
- * Club domestic league appearances and goals

Alessandro Zoppetti (born 28 March 1979) is an Italian former football defender.

Zoppetti came through the ranks of Cremonese as a teenager, where he was snapped up by Reggina. He failed to establish himself with the amaranto and was subsequently sent out on loan to several Serie B clubs.

He signed a 3-year contract with Pescara in 2005.
