= Matteo Abbate =

Italian footballer and coach (born 1983)

Personal information
- Date of birth: 21 August 1983 (age 43)
- Place of birth: Orbetello, Italy
- Height: 1.84 m (6 ft 1/2 in)
- Positions: Centre-back; right-back

Youth career
- 2001–2003: Piacenza

Senior career*
| Years | Team | Apps | (Gls) |
| 2003–2009 | Piacenza | 73 | (2) |
| 2007 | → Ancona (loan) | 6 | (0) |
| 2009–2010 | Gallipoli | 30 | (1) |
| 2010–2013 | Verona | 58 | (4) |
| 2013 | → Pro Vercelli (loan) | 12 | (0) |
| 2013–2014 | Cremonese | 24 | (0) |
| 2014–2016 | Pavia | 29 | (1) |
| 2016–2017 | Piacenza | 22 | (0) |
| 2017–2018 | Pro Piacenza | 7 | (0) |

Managerial career
- 2023: Piacenza
- 2023–2024: Pergolettese
- * Club domestic league appearances and goals

Matteo Abbate (born 21 August 1983) is an Italian football coach and former defender.

== Playing career ==
Abbate started his career at Piacenza.

In 2010, Abbate joined Hellas Verona F.C. in 2-year contract. The contract later extended.

In January 2013 he was signed by Pro Vercelli. On 13 August 2013 Abbate joined Cremonese.

On 11 August 2016 Abbate re-joined Piacenza.

== Coaching career ==
In 2018, Abbate was appointed assistant coach of Stefano Rossini at Serie D club Vigor Carpaneto. He successively joined Monza as a youth coach in 2019.

In 2021, Alessandria appointed him their under-19 youth coach. In 2022, Abbate signed for Piacenza as a youth coach and was successively promoted to head coach in February 2023, failing to save the club from relegation.

On 6 June 2023, Abbate signed for Serie C club Pergolettese. He was sacked on 15 February 2024 following a negative string of results.
