= 1994 Torneo di Viareggio =

1994 Torneo Mondiale di Calcio Coppa Carnevale
46° Torneo di Viareggio

Tournament details
- Host country: Italy
- City: Viareggio
- Dates: January 30, 1994 - February 14, 1994
- Teams: 24

Final positions
- Champions: (Italy) Juventus
- Runners-up: (Italy) Fiorentina

Tournament statistics
- Matches played: 50
- Goals scored: 130 (2.6 per match)

The 1994 winners of the Torneo di Viareggio (in English, the Viareggio Tournament, officially the Viareggio Cup World Football Tournament Coppa Carnevale), the annual youth football tournament held in Viareggio, Tuscany, are listed below.

== Format ==
The 24 teams are seeded in 6 groups. Each team from a group meets the others in a single tie. The winning club and runners-up from each group progress to the second round. In the second round teams are split up in two groups and meet in a single tie (with penalties after regular time). Winners progress to the final knockout stage, along with the best losing team from each group. The final round matches include 30 minutes extra time and penalties to be played if the draw between teams still holds. The semifinals winning teams play the final with extra time and repeat the match if the draw holds.

== Participating teams ==
Italian teams

- (Italy) Atalanta
- (Italy) Bari
- (Italy) Cagliari
- (Italy) Cosenza
- (Italy) Fiorentina
- (Italy) Inter Milan
- (Italy) Juventus
- (Italy) Lazio
- (Italy) Milan
- (Italy) Monza
- (Italy) Napoli
- (Italy) Palermo
- (Italy) Parma
- (Italy) Reggiana
- (Italy) Roma
- (Italy) Sambenedettese
- (Italy) Torino
- (Italy) Verona

European teams

- (Germany) Werder Bremen

American teams

- (United States) USA Soccer
- (Mexico) Pumas
- (Brazil) Flamengo

Asian teams

- Indonesia
- (Japan) Yomiuri

== Group stage ==
=== Group 1 ===
Team	Pts	Pld	W	D	L	GF	GA	GD
(Italy) Torino	7	3	2	1	0	7	2	+5
(Italy) Napoli	5	3	1	2	0	5	2	+3
(Italy) Cosenza	4	3	1	1	1	8	3	+5
Indonesia	0	3	0	0	3	2	15	-13

=== Group 2 ===
Team	Pts	Pld	W	D	L	GF	GA	GD
(Italy) Monza	7	3	2	1	0	4	1	+3
(Italy) Juventus	5	3	1	2	0	4	3	+1
(Italy) Lazio	4	3	1	1	1	3	3	0
(Mexico) Pumas	0	3	0	0	3	2	6	-4

=== Group 3 ===
Team	Pts	Pld	W	D	L	GF	GA	GD
(Italy) Cagliari	7	3	2	1	0	6	1	+5
(Italy) Atalanta	5	3	1	2	0	5	1	+4
(United States) USA Soccer	4	3	1	1	1	6	3	+3
(Italy) Sambenedettese	0	3	0	0	3	0	12	-12

=== Group 4 ===
Team	Pts	Pld	W	D	L	GF	GA	GD
(Italy) Fiorentina	6	3	2	0	1	4	2	+2
(Italy) Roma	5	3	1	2	0	3	2	+1
(Brazil) Flamengo	4	3	1	1	1	4	3	+1
(Italy) Reggiana	1	3	0	1	2	1	5	-4

=== Group 5 ===
Team	Pts	Pld	W	D	L	GF	GA	GD
(Italy) Milan	9	3	3	0	0	8	1	+7
(Italy) Bari	6	3	2	0	1	5	5	0
(Italy) Verona	3	3	1	0	2	5	5	0
(Japan) Yomiuri	0	3	0	0	3	2	9	-7

=== Group 6 ===
Team	Pts	Pld	W	D	L	GF	GA	GD
(Italy) Inter Milan	7	3	2	1	0	5	0	+5
(Italy) Parma	3	3	0	3	0	2	2	0
(Italy) Palermo	2	3	0	2	1	3	4	-1
(Germany) Werder Bremen	2	3	0	2	1	3	7	-4

== Second round ==
(Italy) Torino	1 - 0	(Italy) Juventus

(Italy) Napoli	3 - 1	(Italy) Monza

(Italy) Roma	2 - 0	(Italy) Cagliari

(Italy) Fiorentina	2 - 2 (5-3 pen)	(Italy) Atalanta

(Italy) Milan	1 - 0	(Italy) Parma

(Italy) Bari	0 - 0 (3-1 pen)	(Italy) Inter Milan

== Knockout stage ==
Quarter-finals
10 February
(Italy) Juventus	2
(Italy) Napoli	1
10 February
(Italy) Roma (pen)	1 (4)
(Italy) Torino	1 (3)
10 February
(Italy) Fiorentina	1
(Italy) Bari	0
10 February
(Italy) Milan	1
(Italy) Atalanta	0

Semi-finals
12 February
(Italy) Juventus	1
(Italy) Roma	0
12 February
(Italy) Fiorentina (pen)	2 (4)
(Italy) Milan	2 (2)

Final
16 February
(Italy) Juventus (a.e.t.)	3
(Italy) Fiorentina	2

== Champions ==
Torneo di Viareggio 1994 Champions

Juventus
2nd time
