= Maurizio Franzone =

Italian footballer

Personal information
- Date of birth: 22 May 1969 (age 57)
- Place of birth: Piacenza, Italy
- Height: 1.80 m (5 ft 11 in)
- Position: Goalkeeper

Youth career
- –1989: Piacenza

Senior career*
Years	Team	Apps	(Gls)
1989–1990	Fidenza	0	(0)
1990–1993	Suzzara	26	(0)
1993–1995	Como	65	(0)
1995–1997	Salernitana	4	(0)
1997–2000	Cagliari	13	(0)
2000–2001	Giulianova	7	(0)
2001–2002	Reggina	2	(0)
2003	Piacenza	1	(0)
Total		118	(0)

Managerial career
- 2004–2005: Cagliari (goalkeepers coach)
- 2005–2008: Miami Strike Force
- * Club domestic league appearances and goals

Maurizio Franzone (born 25 May 1969) is an Italian former professional footballer who played as a goalkeeper.

== Career ==
Revealed by the youth sectors at Piacenza, Franzone stood out in particular playing for Como and Cagliari, where he made 13 appearances in three seasons in Serie A. He also played for Reggina and retired in February 2003, playing again for Piacenza in the match against Perugia. In addition to football, Franzone played for the Italy national beach soccer team, was goalkeeping coach at Cagliari and manager of the Miami Strike Force project.

== Personal life ==
Maurizio is son of fellow football goalkeeper Avio Franzone, who played for Piacenza and Brescia during 1960s and 1970s.
