= Gianluca Savoldi =

Italian footballer

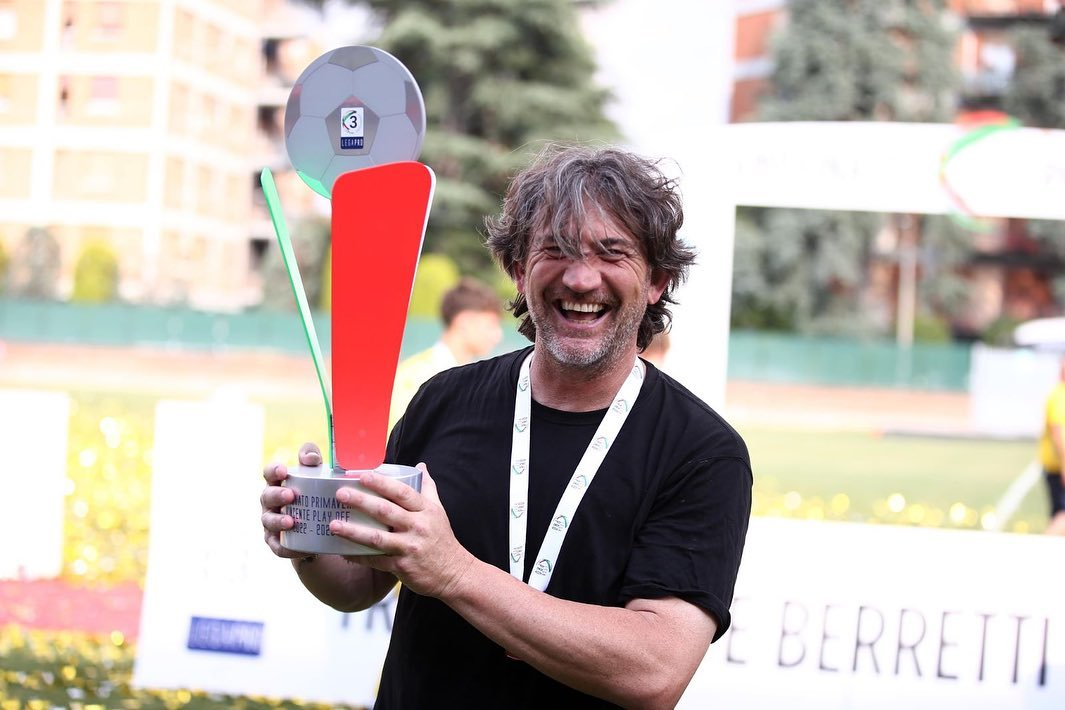
- Berretti Trophy in 2023

Personal information
- Date of birth: 20 September 1975 (age 51)
- Place of birth: Bologna, Italy
- Height: 1.80 m (5 ft 11 in)
- Position: Striker

Senior career*
Years	Team	Apps	(Gls)
1993–1994	Palazzolo	29	(3)
1994–1995	Pergocrema	27	(5)
1995–1996	Cecina	28	(11)
1996–1998	Pisa	56	(17)
1998–1999	Saronno	18	(3)
1999	Ascoli	13	(3)
1999–2000	Pisa	32	(11)
2000–2001	Cosenza	9	(0)
2001–2003	Reggina	62	(20)
2003–2004	Napoli	13	(2)
2004–2005	Crotone	8	(0)
2005	Venezia	10	(0)
2005–2006	Chiasso	11	(3)
2006	Avellino	3	(0)
2006–2007	Varese	9	(5)
2007–2008	Lecco	40	(16)
2008–2009	Monza	6	(0)
2009–2010	Colligiana	13	(3)
Total		387	(102)
- * Club domestic league appearances and goals

Gianluca Savoldi (born 20 September 1975 in Bologna, Italy), is a retired Italian footballer who played as a striker.

== Career ==
The son of once World record transferred player Giuseppe Savoldi, the young Gianluca decided to walk in his father's footsteps. Albeit a decent striker on semi-professional level, Savoldi could not step ut to the plate when joining Ascoli in the late 1990s, but played good enough at Cosenza to be discovered by nearby Reggina, the club looking for a striker, having been relegated to Serie B and lost Massimo Marazzina.

Savoldi's first season with Reggina was the most successful of his career, the 25-year-old propelling Reggina to Serie A with 15 goals. His partnership with Davide Dionigi played its part in the success, as Reggina was among the highest-scoring teams in the league. Savoldi did only play one season in Serie A, however, with his performance at the highest level not considered as good enough by Reggina's management, prompting a sale to Serie B club Napoli, where he rejoined Dionigi. Napoli was the club that paid the World record-fee for his father, and therefore the expectations were high on Savoldi, who once again failed to deliver. Napoli was closer to relegation than promotion, and Savoldi was sold to Crotone, which was the beginning of the end of his career in the big time.

Savoldi spent the following six seasons in smaller clubs, some professional, others in a semi-professional mode. He also moved north of the border to try his wings in second division Swiss football, but his time with Chiasso was not a successful one.

== Sources ==
Gianluca Savoldi - Tuttocalciatori.net (Italian)
