= 2000–01 Juventus FC season =

Italian football club season

Juventus
2000–01 season
- President: Vittorio Chiusano
- Manager: Carlo Ancelotti
- Stadium: Stadio delle Alpi
- Serie A: 2nd
- Coppa Italia: Round of 16
- UEFA Champions League: First group stage
- Top goalscorer: League: David Trezeguet (14); All: Filippo Inzaghi (16)
- Average home league attendance: 41,307
Home colours	Away colours	Third colours

The 2000–01 season was Juventus Football Club's 103rd in existence and 99th consecutive season in the top flight of Italian football.

== Season review ==
Juventus just came up short in Serie A for the second year in a row. Unlike in 2000, it did not have matters in its own hands prior to the final game of the season, and even though Juventus fended off Atalanta 2–1 at home, Roma beat Parma 3–1, which meant the title landed with a Roman club for the second year running.

The determining moment of the title race had been a showdown between Juventus and Roma at the Stadio delle Alpi with six games to go, and the Bianconeri closing down on the Romans who had suffered a recent dip in their form. In front of their crowd, Juventus began the brightest. Two goals in quick succession by Alessandro Del Piero and Zinedine Zidane gave them a lead they held on to until the 79th minute, when Edwin van der Sar took center stage. The Dutch goalkeeper fumbled a long-range effort from Roma's Japanese midfielder Hidetoshi Nakata, enabling the latter to score a fortunate goal. In added time, Vincenzo Montella equalized for the Roman club, thus denying Juventus a vital victory.

La Vecchia Signora did win all five of its remaining games after that, but in the meantime, Roma did enough to make sure they didn't lose the top spot of the table, thus winning their first scudetto since 1983. The success was celebrated wildly in the streets of the Italian capital, and the fact that Roma had beaten bitter rivals Juventus to the title made the supporters even happier.

In the Champions League, Juventus was a major disappointment, getting knocked out in the first group stage of the tournament. It was the first time in the club's history that it had been knocked so early in the competition. This performance put Carlo Ancelotti's position at the helm under even more threat. Ancelotti had already been associated in the previous season with the club's worst run in any European competition since the 1987–88 season. As a man who had been associated with Juve's rivals Milan, Roma and Parma for most of his footballing career, he had never been a popular choice with the fans, with frequent doubts being raised about his lack of concern for the club's declining fortunes.

In the summer of 2001, wholesale changes were made. Marcello Lippi returned to his old job prior to the 2001–02 season. It was also Zinedine Zidane's last season with Juventus as he was sold for a world record fee to Real Madrid, but the Italian club compensated his loss with four new players during the summer, with Gianluigi Buffon and Lilian Thuram coming from Parma, and Pavel Nedvěd and Marcelo Salas came from Lazio.

== Players ==
=== Squad information ===
Note: Flags indicate national team as defined under FIFA eligibility rules; some limited exceptions apply. Players may hold more than one non-FIFA nationality.

No.	Pos.	Nation	Player
1	GK	NED	Edwin van der Sar
2	DF	ITA	Ciro Ferrara
3	DF	ITA	Michele Paramatti
4	DF	URU	Paolo Montero
5	DF	CRO	Igor Tudor
6	MF	URU	Fabián O'Neill
7	DF	ITA	Gianluca Pessotto
8	MF	ITA	Antonio Conte (captain)
9	FW	ITA	Filippo Inzaghi
10	FW	ITA	Alessandro Del Piero
11	FW	URU	Daniel Fonseca
12	GK	ITA	Michelangelo Rampulla
13	DF	ITA	Mark Iuliano
14	MF	ITA	Jonathan Bachini
15	DF	ITA	Alessandro Birindelli
16	DF	ITA	Marco Zanchi
17	FW	FRA	David Trezeguet
18	FW	YUG	Darko Kovačević

No.	Pos.	Nation	Player
19	FW	ARG	Juan Esnáider
20	MF	ITA	Alessio Tacchinardi
21	MF	FRA	Zinedine Zidane
22	GK	SWE	Andreas Isaksson
23	DF	ITA	Gianluca Zambrotta
25	MF	ITA	Matteo Brighi
26	MF	NED	Edgar Davids
27	MF	ITA	Marco Rigoni
28	DF	BRA	Athirson
29	DF	ITA	Domenico Maietta
30	DF	ITA	Francesco Scardina
31	MF	ITA	Andrea Gasbarroni
32	MF	ITA	Vito Redavid
33	FW	FRA	Vincent Péricard
34	GK	ITA	Andrea D'Amico
35	GK	URU	Fabián Carini
36	MF	ITA	Salvatore Papa
37	GK	ITA	Antonio Mirante

==== Transfers ====
In
Pos.	Name	from	Type
FW	David Trezeguet	AS Monaco	
DF	Michele Paramatti	Bologna	
MF	Fabian O'Neill	Cagliari Calcio	€10 million
DF	Marco Zanchi	Udinese Calcio	
MF	Matteo Brighi	Rimini	loan ended
FW	Vincent Péricard	AS Saint-Étienne	

Out
Pos.	Name	To	Type
DF	Zoran Mirković	Fenerbahçe	
MF	Sunday Oliseh	Borussia Dortmund	
FW	Juan Esnaider	Real Zaragoza	loan
MF	Enzo Maresca	Bologna	loan

==== Winter ====
In
Pos.	Name	from	Type
GK	Fabian Carini	Danubio	
MF	Athirson	Flamengo	

Out
Pos.	Name	To	Type
MF	Jonathan Bachini	Vicenza Calcio	loan
DF	Marco Zanchi	Perugia Calcio	loan
MF	Marco Rigoni	Ravenna	loan

== Competitions ==
=== Serie A ===
==== League table ====
Pos	Team	Pld	W	D	L	GF	GA	GD	Pts	Qualification or relegation
1	Roma (C)	34	22	9	3	68	33	+35	75	Qualification to Champions League first group stage
2	Juventus	34	21	10	3	61	27	+34	73	Qualification to Champions League first group stage
3	Lazio	34	21	6	7	65	36	+29	69	Qualification to Champions League third qualifying round
4	Parma	34	16	8	10	51	31	+20	56	Qualification to Champions League third qualifying round
5	Internazionale	34	14	9	11	47	47	0	51	Qualification to UEFA Cup first round

Source: 2000–01 Serie A, Soccerway, RSSSF.com
Rules for classification: 1) Points; 2) Head-to-head points; 3) Head-to-head goal difference; 4) Goal difference; 5) Goals scored; 6) Draw. (Note: Head-to-head record is used only after all the matches between the teams in question have been played).
(C) Champions

==== Results summary ====
Overall								Home						Away					
Pld	W	D	L	GF	GA	GD	Pts	W	D	L	GF	GA	GD	W	D	L	GF	GA	GD
34	21	10	3	61	27	+34	73	11	5	1	32	13	+19	10	5	2	29	14	+15

Last updated: 17 June 2001.
Source: Competitive matches

==== Results by round ====
Round	1	2	3	4	5	6	7	8	9	10	11	12	13	14	15	16	17	18	19	20	21	22	23	24	25	26	27	28	29	30	31	32	33	34
Ground	A	H	A	H	A	H	A	H	A	H	A	A	H	H	A	H	A	H	A	H	A	H	A	H	A	H	A	H	H	A	A	H	A	H
Result	W	W	D	L	W	D	D	W	D	W	W	D	D	W	W	W	L	W	W	W	W	W	L	D	W	W	D	D	D	W	W	W	W	W
Position	4	2	3	5	4	4	6	5	6	3	2	2	2	2	2	2	2	2	2	2	2	2	2	2	2	2	2	3	3	3	3	2	2	2

Source: Competitive matches
A = Away; H = Home; W = Win; D = Draw; L = Loss; P = Postponed; = Leader, 2001–02 UEFA Champions League Group stage; = 2001–02 UEFA Champions League Group stage; = 2001–02 UEFA Champions League Qualifying round; = 2001–02 UEFA Cup First round; = Qualification to Intertoto Cup; = 2001–02 Serie B

==== Matches ====
30 September 2000 1	Napoli	1–2	Juventus	Naples
20:30 CEST (UTC+02:00)	Stellone 43'	Report	Kovačević 67'; Del Piero 75'	Stadium: Stadio San Paolo; Attendance: 67,927; Referee: Pierluigi Collina

15 October 2000 2	Juventus	2–0	Bari	Turin
15:00 CEST (UTC+02:00)	Kovačević 2'; Zidane 90+2' (pen.)	Report		Stadium: Stadio delle Alpi; Attendance: 35,866; Referee: Graziano Cesari

21 October 2000 3	Milan	2–2	Juventus	Milan
20:30 CEST (UTC+02:00)	Ambrosini 59'; Shevchenko 60'	Report	Trezeguet 67'; Conte 90'	Stadium: San Siro; Attendance: 81,954; Referee: Stefano Braschi

1 November 2000 4	Juventus	1–2	Udinese	Turin
15:00 CET (UTC+01:00)	Del Piero 78' (pen.)	Report	Sosa 23', 68'	Stadium: Stadio delle Alpi; Attendance: 36,941; Referee: Cosimo Bolognino

5 November 2000 5	Reggina	0–2	Juventus	Reggio Calabria
15:00 CET (UTC+01:00)		Report	Trezeguet 44', 62'	Stadium: Stadio Oreste Granillo; Attendance: 25,074; Referee: Domenico Messina

11 November 2000 6	Juventus	1–1	Lazio	Turin
20:30 CET (UTC+01:00)	Tudor 22'	Report	Salas 30'	Stadium: Stadio delle Alpi; Attendance: 42,095; Referee: Stefano Braschi

19 November 2000 7	Brescia	0–0	Juventus	Brescia
15:00 CET (UTC+01:00)		Report		Stadium: Stadio Mario Rigamonti; Attendance: 19,353; Referee: Stefano Farina

26 November 2000 8	Juventus	2–1	Hellas Verona	Turin
15:00 CET (UTC+01:00)	Trezeguet 38'; Zidane 74'	Report	Adaílton 89'	Stadium: Stadio delle Alpi; Attendance: 37,372; Referee: Danilo Nucini

3 December 2000 9	Internazionale	2–2	Juventus	Milan
20:30 CET (UTC+01:00)	Blanc 13'; Di Biagio 66'	Report	Trezeguet 7'; Zidane 10'	Stadium: San Siro; Attendance: 75,377; Referee: Stefano Braschi

10 December 2000 10	Juventus	1–0	Parma	Turin
15:00 CET (UTC+01:00)	Ferrara 14'	Report		Stadium: Stadio delle Alpi; Attendance: 37,922; Referee: Pierluigi Collina

17 December 2000 11	Lecce	1–4	Juventus	Lecce
15:00 CET (UTC+01:00)	Giorgetti 70'	Report	Inzaghi 12'; Trezeguet 28'; Kovačević 87'; Zambrotta 90+1'	Stadium: Stadio Via del Mare; Attendance: 26,942; Referee: Salvatore Racalbuto

22 December 2000 12	Roma	0–0	Juventus	Rome
20:30 CET (UTC+01:00)		Report		Stadium: Stadio Olimpico; Attendance: 73,411; Referee: Gennaro Borriello

7 January 2001 13	Juventus	3–3	Fiorentina	Turin
20:30 CET (UTC+01:00)	Conte 33'; Inzaghi 49' (pen.), 57'	Report	Chiesa 5', 63'; Nuno Gomes 18'	Stadium: Stadio delle Alpi; Attendance: 41,933; Referee: Graziano Cesari

14 January 2001 14	Juventus	1–0	Bologna	Turin
15:00 CET (UTC+01:00)	Trezeguet 12'	Report		Stadium: Stadio delle Alpi; Attendance: 36,778; Referee: Danilo Nucini

21 January 2001 15	Perugia	0–1	Juventus	Perugia
15:00 CET (UTC+01:00)		Report	Inzaghi 59'	Stadium: Stadio Renato Curi; Attendance: 18,759; Referee: Pierluigi Collina

28 January 2001 16	Juventus	4–0	Vicenza	Turin
15:00 CET (UTC+01:00)	Inzaghi 8', 42', 69'; Davids 23'	Report		Stadium: Stadio delle Alpi; Attendance: 36,809; Referee: Paolo Bertini

3 February 2001 17	Atalanta	2–1	Juventus	Bergamo
20:30 CET (UTC+01:00)	Lorenzi 75'; Ventola 82'	Report	Paganin 73' (o.g.)	Stadium: Stadio Atleti Azzurri d'Italia; Attendance: 24,393; Referee: Massimo De Santis

11 February 2001 18	Juventus	3–0	Napoli	Turin
20:30 CET (UTC+01:00)	Kovačević 12'; Inzaghi 52'; Del Piero 86'	Report		Stadium: Stadio delle Alpi; Attendance: 39,287; Referee: Gennaro Borriello

18 February 2001 19	Bari	0–1	Juventus	Bari
15:00 CET (UTC+01:00)		Report	Del Piero 81'	Stadium: Stadio San Nicola; Attendance: 33,175; Referee: Graziano Cesari

25 February 2001 20	Juventus	3–0	Milan	Turin
20:30 CET (UTC+01:00)	Tudor 9'; Inzaghi 67'; Zidane 90+1'	Report		Stadium: Stadio delle Alpi; Attendance: 48,100; Referee: Stefano Braschi

4 March 2001 21	Udinese	0–2	Juventus	Udine
15:00 CET (UTC+01:00)		Report	Zambrotta 38'; Inzaghi 60'	Stadium: Stadio Friuli; Attendance: 30,031; Referee: Massimo De Santis

11 March 2001 22	Juventus	1–0	Reggina	Turin
15:00 CET (UTC+01:00)	Tudor 31'	Report		Stadium: Stadio delle Alpi; Attendance: 38,346; Referee: Danilo Nucini

18 March 2001 23	Lazio	4–1	Juventus	Rome
20:30 CET (UTC+01:00)	Nedvěd 22', 66'; Crespo 46', 81'	Report	Del Piero 59'	Stadium: Stadio Olimpico; Attendance: 68,641; Referee: Pierluigi Collina

1 April 2001 24	Juventus	1–1	Brescia	Turin
15:00 CEST (UTC+02:00)	Zambrotta 30'	Report	R. Baggio 86'	Stadium: Stadio delle Alpi; Attendance: 38,089; Referee: Gennaro Borriello

8 April 2001 25	Hellas Verona	0–1	Juventus	Verona
15:00 CEST (UTC+02:00)		Report	Del Piero 45+4' (pen.)	Stadium: Stadio Marc'Antonio Bentegodi; Attendance: 25,942; Referee: Pasquale Rodomonti P.

14 April 2001 26	Juventus	3–1	Internazionale	Turin
20:30 CEST (UTC+02:00)	Tacchinardi 51'; Inzaghi 55'; Del Piero 63'	Report	Vieri 66' (pen.)	Stadium: Stadio delle Alpi; Attendance: 49,916; Referee: Graziano Cesari

22 April 2001 27	Parma	0–0	Juventus	Parma
20:30 CEST (UTC+02:00)		Report		Stadium: Stadio Ennio Tardini; Attendance: 27,148; Referee: Stefano Braschi

29 April 2001 28	Juventus	1–1	Lecce	Turin
15:00 CEST (UTC+02:00)	Tudor 40'	Report	Conticchio 41'	Stadium: Stadio delle Alpi; Attendance: 39,112; Referee: Emilio Pellegrino

6 May 2001 29	Juventus	2–2	Roma	Turin
20:30 CEST (UTC+02:00)	Del Piero 4'; Zidane 6'	Report	Nakata 79'; Montella 90+1'	Stadium: Stadio delle Alpi; Attendance: 63,548; Referee: Stefano Braschi

11 May 2001 30	Fiorentina	1–3	Juventus	Florence
20:30 CEST (UTC+02:00)	Rossi 40'	Report	Zidane 24'; Tudor 28'; Trezeguet 89'	Stadium: Stadio Artemio Franchi; Attendance: 36,714; Referee: Graziano Cesari

20 May 2001 31	Bologna	1–4	Juventus	Bologna
15:00 CEST (UTC+02:00)	Signori 20'	Report	Trezeguet 27', 48'; Tudor 45+1'; Kovačević 81'	Stadium: Stadio Renato Dall'Ara; Attendance: 33,899; Referee: Daniele Tombolini

27 May 2001 32	Juventus	1–0	Perugia	Turin
15:00 CEST (UTC+02:00)	Trezeguet 55'	Report		Stadium: Stadio delle Alpi; Attendance: 36,693; Referee: Cosimo Bolognino

10 June 2001 33	Vicenza	0–3	Juventus	Vicenza
15:00 CEST (UTC+02:00)		Report	Del Piero 37'; Trezeguet 40', 51'	Stadium: Stadio Romeo Menti; Attendance: 18,461; Referee: Massimo De Santis

17 June 2001 34	Juventus	2–1	Atalanta	Turin
15:00 CEST (UTC+02:00)	Trezeguet 6'; Tacchinardi 64'	Report	Nappi 78'	Stadium: Stadio delle Alpi; Attendance: 42,847; Referee: Cosimo Bolognino

=== Coppa Italia ===
==== Round of 16 ====
16 September 2000 First leg	Brescia	0–0	Juventus	Brescia
18:00		Report		Stadium: Stadio Mario Rigamonti; Referee: Stefano Braschi

23 September 2000 Second leg	Juventus	1–2 (1–2 agg.)	Brescia	Turin
21:00	Conte 22'	Report	Hübner 47', 73'	Stadium: Stadio delle Alpi; Referee: Graziano Cesari

=== UEFA Champions League ===
==== Group stage ====
Pos	Team	Pld	W	D	L	GF	GA	GD	Pts	Qualification	DEP	PAN	HAM	JUV
1	(Spain) Deportivo La Coruña	6	2	4	0	6	4	+2	10	Advance to second group stage	—	1–0	2–1	1–1
2	(Greece) Panathinaikos	6	2	2	2	6	5	+1	8	Advance to second group stage	1–1	—	0–0	3–1
3	(Germany) Hamburger SV	6	1	3	2	9	9	0	6	Transfer to UEFA Cup	1–1	0–1	—	4–4
4	(Italy) Juventus	6	1	3	2	9	12	−3	6		0–0	2–1	1–3	—

Source: UEFA

13 September 2000 1	Hamburg (Germany)	4–4	(Italy) Juventus	Hamburg, Germany
20:45 CEST (UTC+02:00)	Yeboah 17'; Mahdavikia 65'; Butt 72' (pen.); Kovač 82'; Barbarez (yellow card) 90'	Report	Tudor 6'; Inzaghi 36', 52', 88' (pen.); O'Neill (yellow card) 41'; Davids (yellow card) 45'; Iuliano (yellow card) 50'	Stadium: Volksparkstadion; Referee: Vítor Melo Pereira (Portugal)

19 September 2000 2	Juventus (Italy)	2–1	(Greece) Panathinaikos	Turin, Italy
20:45 CEST (UTC+02:00)	Tacchinardi 35', (yellow card) 73'; Bachini (yellow card) 47'; Trezeguet 83'	Report	Fyssas (yellow card) 33'; Goumas 45+2'	Stadium: Stadio delle Alpi; Referee: Rune Pedersen (Norway)

26 September 2000 3	Juventus (Italy)	0–0	(Spain) Deportivo La Coruña	Turin, Italy
20:45 CEST (UTC+02:00)	Zidane (red card) 68'; Iuliano (yellow card) 71'; Ferrara (yellow card) 81'	Report	Fran (yellow card) 45'; Manuel Pablo (yellow card) 86'	Stadium: Stadio delle Alpi; Attendance: 35,753; Referee: Urs Meier (Switzerland)

18 October 2000 4	Deportivo La Coruña (Spain)	1–1	(Italy) Juventus	A Coruña, Spain
20:45 CEST (UTC+02:00)	Víctor 11', (yellow card) 74'; Djalminha (yellow card) 61'	Report	Inzaghi 10'; Ferrara (yellow card) 22'; Davids (yellow card) 32'; Del Piero (yellow card) 44'	Stadium: Estadio Riazor; Attendance: 40,000; Referee: Gilles Veissière (France)

24 October 2000 5	Juventus (Italy)	1–3	(Germany) Hamburg	Turin, Italy
20:45 CEST (UTC+02:00)	Zidane (red card) 29'; Davids (yellow card) 33' (yellow-red card); Paramatti (yellow card) 45'; Kovačević 56', (yellow card) 65'	Report	Präger 24'; Yeboah 48'; Panadić 62'; Tøfting (yellow card) 64'	Stadium: Stadio delle Alpi; Referee: Stuart Dougal (Scotland)

8 November 2000 6	Panathinaikos (Greece)	3–1	(Italy) Juventus	Athens, Greece
20:45 CET (UTC+01:00)	Sousa 7'; Vokolos (yellow card) 48'; Basinas 58' (pen.); Warzycha (yellow card) 61', (goal) 65'; Sypniewski (yellow card) 89'	Report	Inzaghi 24'; Van der Sar (yellow card) 40' (yellow-red card) 56'; Kovačević (yellow card) 45' (yellow-red card) 68'; Iuliano (yellow card) 45'; Zanchi (yellow card) 54'; Conte (yellow card) 81'; Ferrara (yellow card) 89'	Stadium: Olympic Stadium; Referee: Dick Jol (Netherlands)

== Statistics ==
=== Players statistics ===
No.	Pos	Nat	Player	Total		Serie A		Coppa		Champions	
No.	Pos	Nat	Player	Apps	Goals	Apps	Goals	Apps	Goals	Apps	Goals
1	GK	(Netherlands) NED	van der Sar	42	-39	34	-27	2	-2	6	-10
13	DF	(Italy) ITA	Iuliano	28	0	23	0	0	0	5	0
5	DF	(Croatia) CRO	Tudor	32	7	21+4	6	2	0	5	1
4	DF	(Uruguay) URU	Montero	23	0	21+2	0	0	0	0	0
7	DF	(Italy) ITA	Pessotto	39	0	32	0	1	0	6	0
23	MF	(Italy) ITA	Zambrotta	29	3	19+10	3	0	0	0	0
20	MF	(Italy) ITA	Tacchinardi	38	2	29+2	2	2	0	5	0
21	MF	(France) FRA	Zidane	39	6	33	6	2	0	4	0
26	MF	(Netherlands) NED	Davids	32	1	26	1	1	0	5	0
9	FW	(Italy) ITA	Inzaghi	34	16	24+4	11	0	0	6	5
10	FW	(Italy) ITA	Del Piero	33	9	21+4	9	2	0	6	0
12	GK	(Italy) ITA	Rampulla	1	-2	0	0	0	0	1	-2
17	FW	(France) FRA	Trezeguet	32	15	18+7	14	2	0	5	1
2	DF	(Italy) ITA	Ferrara	30	1	15+8	1	1	0	6	0
8	MF	(Italy) ITA	Conte	28	3	14+7	2	2	1	5	0
15	DF	(Italy) ITA	Birindelli	25	0	14+5	0	1	0	5	0
3	DF	(Italy) ITA	Paramatti	21	0	12+4	0	2	0	3	0
18	FW	(Federal Republic of Yugoslavia) YUG	Kovacevic	27	6	6+15	5	2	0	4	1
6	MF	(Uruguay) URU	O'Neill	13	0	3+7	0	1	0	2	0
14	MF	(Italy) ITA	Bachini	12	0	3+4	0	2	0	3	0
16	DF	(Italy) ITA	Zanchi	7	0	2+3	0	0	0	2	0
28	DF	(Brazil) BRA	Athirson	5	0	2+3	0	0	0	0	0
25	MF	(Italy) ITA	Brighi	12	0	1+10	0	1	0	0	0
11	FW	(Uruguay) URU	Fonseca	3	0	0+2	0	1	0	0	0
27	MF	(Italy) ITA	Rigoni	0	0	0	0				
29	DF	(Italy) ITA	Maietta	0	0	0	0				
30	DF	(Italy) ITA	Scardina	0	0	0	0				
31	MF	(Italy) ITA	Gasbarroni	0	0	0	0				
33	FW	(France) FRA	Pericard	0	0	0	0				
36	MF	(Italy) ITA	Papa	0	0	0	0				
35	GK	(Uruguay) URU	Carini	0	0	0	0				
19	FW	(Argentina) ARG	Esnaider								

- Source: http://calcio-seriea.net/presenze/2000/1185/
