= 1999–2000 Juventus FC season =

Italian football club season

Juventus
1999–2000 season
- President: Vittorio Chiusano
- Manager: Carlo Ancelotti
- Stadium: Stadio delle Alpi
- Serie A: 2nd
- Coppa Italia: Quarter-finals
- UEFA Intertoto Cup: Winners
- UEFA Cup: Fourth round
- Top goalscorer: League: Filippo Inzaghi (15); All: Filippo Inzaghi (26)
- Average home league attendance: 42,127
Home colours	Away colours	Third colours

The 1999–2000 season was Juventus Football Club's 102nd in existence and 98th consecutive season in the top flight of Italian football.

== Season review ==
Juventus came close to adding to its collection of league titles, but in the end, a controversial refereeing decision denied them the title.

Juventus led 1–0 at home to Parma in their penultimate match. Parma made a huge effort to equalise, and thought they had done so when Fabio Cannavaro headed the ball into the back of the net during stoppage time. However, referee Massimo De Santis controversially disallowed the goal due to a perceived foul, despite protests from the Parma players.

On the last day of the season, title rivals Lazio beat Reggina by 3–0 at home, but Juventus unexpectedly ran into problems at Perugia, where heavy rainfall began with the score tied at 0–0 in half-time. Referee Pierluigi Collina nonetheless decided to kick off the game, albeit half an hour too late. Nervous Laziali and players followed the Perugia–Juventus game via radio, hoping that Juventus would be defeated. A draw would mean a re-match between the sides to decide the title, while a win would give Juventus another scudetto. The Juventus players' efforts were in vain, since Alessandro Calori struck a half-volley into the back of the net with half an hour to go. With Juventus unable to make a comeback, they lost the title in the final round of the season.

It was a bitter end to the season for the Turin club, who had led the table for most of the campaign and lost just one of their first 26 matches, only to collapse in the final 8 games (4 losses suffered in those games). To make matters worse, despite initially winning the 1999 UEFA Intertoto Cup, Juventus had endured a humiliating UEFA Cup run, being beaten 4–0 and eliminated in the round of 16 by Spanish club Celta Vigo. This was their earliest exit from European competitions since the 1987–88 UEFA Cup.

== Players ==
=== Squad information ===
Note: Flags indicate national team as defined under FIFA eligibility rules; some limited exceptions apply. Players may hold more than one non-FIFA nationality.

No.	Pos.	Nation	Player
1	GK	NED	Edwin van der Sar
2	DF	ITA	Ciro Ferrara
3	DF	YUG	Zoran Mirković
4	DF	URU	Paolo Montero
5	MF	NGR	Sunday Oliseh
7	DF	ITA	Gianluca Pessotto
8	MF	ITA	Antonio Conte (captain)
9	FW	ITA	Filippo Inzaghi
10	FW	ITA	Alessandro Del Piero (vice-captain)
11	FW	URU	Daniel Fonseca
12	GK	ITA	Michelangelo Rampulla
13	DF	ITA	Mark Iuliano
14	MF	ITA	Jonathan Bachini
15	DF	ITA	Alessandro Birindelli

No.	Pos.	Nation	Player
18	FW	YUG	Darko Kovačević
19	FW	ARG	Juan Esnáider
20	MF	ITA	Alessio Tacchinardi
21	MF	FRA	Zinedine Zidane
22	GK	SWE	Andreas Isaksson
23	DF	ITA	Gianluca Zambrotta
24	MF	ITA	Enzo Maresca
25	MF	ITA	Simone Perrotta
26	MF	NED	Edgar Davids
27	MF	ITA	Marco Rigoni
28	DF	CRO	Igor Tudor
34	GK	ITA	Andrea D'Amico
34	GK	ITA	Egi Mareta

==== Transfers ====
In
Pos.	Name	from	Type
GK	Andreas Isaksson	Trelleborg	
GK	Edwin van der Sar	AFC Ajax	
DF	Marco Zamboni	Lecce	loan ended
MF	Raffaele Ametrano	Salernitana	loan ended
MF	Jonathan Bachini	Udinese Calcio	
MF	Ronnie O'Brien	Middlesbrough F.C.	
MF	Sunday Oliseh	AFC Ajax	
MF	Fabio Pecchia	Sampdoria	loan ended
MF	Gianluca Zambrotta	Bari	
FW	Darko Kovačević	Real Sociedad	
FW	Marcelo Zalayeta	Empoli F.C.	loan ended

Out
Pos.	Name	To	Type
GK	Morgan De Sanctis	Udinese Calcio	co-ownership
GK	Angelo Peruzzi	Inter Milan	
DF	Angelo Di Livio	Fiorentina	
DF	Marco Zamboni	Udinese Calcio	co-ownership
MF	Raffaele Ametrano	Cagliari Calcio	loan
MF	Jocelyn Blanchard	RC Lens	
MF	Didier Deschamps	Chelsea F.C.	
MF	Ronnie O'Brien	Lugano	loan
MF	Fabio Pecchia	Torino	co-ownership
MF	Simone Perrotta	Bari	loan
FW	Nicola Amoruso	Perugia Calcio	loan
FW	Thierry Henry	Arsenal F.C.	
FW	Marcelo Zalayeta	Sevilla CF	loan

== Competitions ==
=== Serie A ===
==== League table ====
Pos	Team	Pld	W	D	L	GF	GA	GD	Pts	Qualification or relegation
1	Lazio (C)	34	21	9	4	64	33	+31	72	Qualification to Champions League first group stage
2	Juventus	34	21	8	5	46	20	+26	71	Qualification to Champions League first group stage
3	Milan	34	16	13	5	65	40	+25	61	Qualification to Champions League third qualifying round
4	Internazionale	34	17	7	10	58	36	+22	58	Qualification to Champions League third qualifying round
5	Parma	34	16	10	8	52	37	+15	58	Qualification to UEFA Cup first round

Source: Soccerway
Rules for classification: 1) points; 2) goal difference; 3) number of goals scored.
(C) Champions

==== Results summary ====
Overall								Home						Away					
Pld	W	D	L	GF	GA	GD	Pts	W	D	L	GF	GA	GD	W	D	L	GF	GA	GD
34	21	8	5	46	20	+26	71	14	2	1	28	8	+20	7	6	4	18	12	+6

Last updated: 14 May 2000.
Source: Competitive matches

==== Results by round ====
Round	1	2	3	4	5	6	7	8	9	10	11	12	13	14	15	16	17	18	19	20	21	22	23	24	25	26	27	28	29	30	31	32	33	34
Ground	H	A	H	A	H	A	A	H	A	H	A	H	H	A	H	A	H	A	H	A	H	A	H	H	A	H	A	H	A	A	H	A	H	A
Result	D	W	W	L	W	W	D	W	D	W	D	W	W	D	W	D	W	W	D	D	W	W	W	W	W	W	L	L	W	W	W	L	W	L
Position	6	5	3	7	4	3	2	2	2	2	3	3	2	2	1	2	1	1	1	2	1	1	1	1	1	1	1	1	1	1	1	1	1	2

Updated to match(es) played on 14 May 2000. Source: Competitive matches
A = Away; H = Home; W = Win; D = Draw; L = Loss; = Leader, UEFA Champions League group stage; = 2000-01 UEFA Champions League group stage; = 2000-01 UEFA Champions League qualifying round; = 2000-01 UEFA Cup; = 2000-01 Serie B

==== Matches ====
29 August 1999 1	Juventus	1–1	Reggina	Turin
20:30	Inzaghi 31'	Report	Kallon 47'	Stadium: Stadio delle Alpi; Referee: Salvatore Racalbuto

12 September 1999 2	Cagliari	0–1	Juventus	Cagliari
15:00		Report	Conte 63'	Stadium: Stadio Sant'Elia; Referee: Gennaro Borriello

19 September 1999 3	Juventus	4–1	Udinese	Turin
15:00	Del Piero 21' (pen.); Inzaghi 23' (pen.), 82'; Zambrotta 48'	Report	Bisgaard 73'	Stadium: Stadio delle Alpi; Referee: Daniele Tombolini

25 September 1999 4	Lecce	2–0	Juventus	Lecce
15:00	Lima 3'; Conticchio 90+6'	Report		Stadium: Stadio Via del Mare; Referee: Emilio Pellegrino

3 October 1999 5	Juventus	1–0	Venezia	Turin
15:00	Conte 90+3'	Report		Stadium: Stadio delle Alpi; Referee: Massimo De Santis

17 October 1999 6	Roma	0–1	Juventus	Rome
20:30		Report	Zidane 50'	Stadium: Stadio Olimpico; Referee: Fiorenzo Treossi

24 October 1999 7	Bari	1–1	Juventus	Bari
15:00	Spinesi 86'	Report	Pessotto 22'	Stadium: Stadio San Nicola; Referee: Cosimo Bolognino

31 October 1999 8	Juventus	1–0	Piacenza	Turin
15:00	Del Piero 77' (pen.)	Report		Stadium: Stadio delle Alpi; Referee: Pasquale Rodomonti P.

7 November 1999 9	Torino	0–0	Juventus	Turin
20:30		Report		Stadium: Stadio delle Alpi; Referee: Livio Bazzoli

21 November 1999 10	Juventus	3–1	Milan	Turin
20:30	Conte 23'; Inzaghi 51'; Kovačević 90+4'	Report	Zidane 21' (o.g.)	Stadium: Stadio delle Alpi; Referee: Massimo De Santis

28 November 1999 11	Lazio	0–0	Juventus	Rome
20:30		Report		Stadium: Stadio Olimpico; Referee: Stefano Braschi

4 December 1999 12	Juventus	2–0	Bologna	Turin
15:00	Inzaghi 55', 71'	Report		Stadium: Stadio delle Alpi; Referee: Graziano Cesari

12 December 1999 13	Juventus	1–0	Internazionale	Turin
20:30	Inzaghi 20'	Report		Stadium: Stadio delle Alpi; Referee: Daniele Tombolini

19 December 1999 14	Fiorentina	1–1	Juventus	Florence
20:30	Batistuta 20'	Report	Tudor 17'	Stadium: Stadio Artemio Franchi; Referee: Domenico Messina

6 January 2000 15	Juventus	1–0	Hellas Verona	Turin
15:00	Inzaghi 46'	Report		Stadium: Stadio delle Alpi; Referee: Angelo Bonfrisco

9 January 2000 16	Parma	1–1	Juventus	Parma
13:00	Crespo 90+2'	Report	Del Piero 69' (pen.)	Stadium: Stadio Ennio Tardini; Referee: Stefano Farina

16 January 2000 17	Juventus	3–0	Perugia	Turin
15:00	Del Piero 26' (pen.); Zidane 89'; Kovačević 90+3'	Report		Stadium: Stadio delle Alpi; Referee: Gennaro Borriello

23 January 2000 18	Reggina	0–2	Juventus	Reggio Calabria
15:00		Report	Kovačević 34'; Zidane 64'	Stadium: Stadio Oreste Granillo; Referee: Tarcisio Serena

30 January 2000 19	Juventus	1–1	Cagliari	Turin
15:00	Inzaghi 1'	Report	Sulcis 14'	Stadium: Stadio delle Alpi; Referee: Fiorenzo Treossi

5 February 2000 20	Udinese	1–1	Juventus	Udine
20:30	Jørgensen 37'	Report	Ferrara 76'	Stadium: Stadio Friuli; Referee: Domenico Messina

13 February 2000 21	Juventus	1–0	Lecce	Turin
15:00	Zidane 26'	Report		Stadium: Stadio delle Alpi; Referee: Cosimo Bolognino

20 February 2000 22	Venezia	0–4	Juventus	Venice
15:00		Report	Del Piero 35' (pen.); Inzaghi 79', 90+1', 90+5'	Stadium: Stadio Pier Luigi Penzo; Referee: Emilio Pellegrino

27 February 2000 23	Juventus	2–1	Roma	Turin
20:30	Davids 31'; Inzaghi 46'	Report	Delvecchio 38'	Stadium: Stadio delle Alpi; Referee: Stefano Braschi

5 March 2000 24	Juventus	2–0	Bari	Turin
15:00	Conte 31'; Del Piero 54' (pen.)	Report		Stadium: Stadio delle Alpi; Referee: Angelo Bonfrisco

12 March 2000 25	Piacenza	0–2	Juventus	Piacenza
15:30		Report	Inzaghi 68', 74'	Stadium: Stadio Leonardo Garilli; Referee: Nicola Ayroldi

19 March 2000 26	Juventus	3–2	Torino	Turin
15:00	Brambilla 23' (o.g.); Lentini 67' (o.g.); Del Piero 73' (pen.)	Report	Ferrante 33' (pen.), 89' (pen.)	Stadium: Stadio delle Alpi; Referee: Pierluigi Collina

24 March 2000 27	Milan	2–0	Juventus	Milan
20:30	Shevchenko 45', 84' (pen.)	Report		Stadium: San Siro; Referee: Gianluca Paparesta

1 April 2000 28	Juventus	0–1	Lazio	Turin
20:30		Report	Simeone 66'	Stadium: Stadio delle Alpi; Referee: Stefano Farina

9 April 2000 29	Bologna	0–2	Juventus	Bologna
15:00		Report	Kovačević 90'; Paganin 90+4' (o.g.)	Stadium: Stadio Renato Dall'Ara; Referee: Massimo De Santis

16 April 2000 30	Internazionale	1–2	Juventus	Milan
20:30	Seedorf 83'	Report	Kovačević 55', 79'	Stadium: San Siro; Referee: Fiorenzo Treossi

22 April 2000 31	Juventus	1–0	Fiorentina	Turin
15:00	Del Piero 45+2' (pen.)	Report		Stadium: Stadio delle Alpi; Referee: Gianluca Paparesta

30 April 2000 32	Hellas Verona	2–0	Juventus	Verona
15:00	Cammarata 45', 57'	Report		Stadium: Stadio Marc'Antonio Bentegodi; Referee: Stefano Braschi

7 May 2000 33	Juventus	1–0	Parma	Turin
15:00	Del Piero 60'	Report		Stadium: Stadio delle Alpi; Referee: Massimo De Santis

14 May 2000 34	Perugia	1–0	Juventus	Perugia
15:00	Calori 49'	Report		Stadium: Stadio Renato Curi; Referee: Pierluigi Collina

=== Coppa Italia ===
==== Round of 16 ====
1 December 1999 First leg	Napoli	1–3	Juventus	Naples
20:45	Turrini 35' (pen.)		Inzaghi 18'; Kovačević 29', 79'	Stadium: Stadio San Paolo; Referee: Pierluigi Collina

16 December 1999 Second leg	Juventus	1–0 (4–1 agg.)	Napoli	Turin
20:45	Esnáider 26'			Stadium: Stadio delle Alpi; Referee: Salvatore Racalbuto

==== Quarter-finals ====
13 January 2000 First leg	Juventus	3–2	Lazio	Turin
20:45	Zidane 12'; Conte 30'; Kovačević 42'		Ravanelli 51' (pen.); Mancini 80'	Stadium: Stadio delle Alpi; Referee: Domenico Messina

26 January 2000 Second leg	Lazio	2–1 (4a–4 agg.)	Juventus	Rome
20:45	Bokšić 53'; Simeone 80'		Del Piero 73'	Stadium: Stadio Olimpico; Referee: Pierluigi Collina

=== UEFA Intertoto Cup ===
==== Third round ====
18 July 1999 First leg	Ceahlăul Piatra Neamț (Romania)	1–1	(Italy) Juventus	Piatra Neamț, Romania
	Scânteie 28'		Tacchinardi 58'	Stadium: Stadionul Ceahlăul; Referee: Dermot Gallagher (England)

24 July 1999 Second leg	Juventus (Italy)	0–0 (1a–1 agg.)	(Romania) Ceahlăul Piatra Neamț	Cesena, Italy
20:45 CEST (UTC+02:00)				Stadium: Stadio Dino Manuzzi; Referee: Roy Helge Olsen (Norway)

==== Semi-finals ====
28 July 1999 First leg	Rostelmash (Russia)	0–4	(Italy) Juventus	Rostov-on-Don, Russia
			Zambrotta 8'; Inzaghi 66', 88' (pen.); Kovačević 68'	Stadium: Rostelmash Stadium; Attendance: 17,000; Referee: Arturo Daudén Ibáñez (Spain)

4 August 1999 Second leg	Juventus (Italy)	5–1 (9–1 agg.)	(Russia) Rostelmash	Cesena, Italy
20:45 CEST (UTC+02:00)	Inzaghi 33' (pen.), 64', 69'; Tacchinardi 48'; Del Piero 75'		Duyun 38'	Stadium: Stadio Dino Manuzzi; Referee: Éric Romain (Belgium)

==== Final ====
10 August 1999 First leg	Juventus (Italy)	2–0	(France) Rennes	Cesena, Italy
20:45 CEST (UTC+02:00)	Inzaghi 32', 63'			Stadium: Stadio Dino Manuzzi; Attendance: 23,609; Referee: Rune Pedersen (Norway)

24 August 1999 Second leg	Rennes (France)	2–2 (2–4 agg.)	(Italy) Juventus	Rennes, France
20:45 CEST (UTC+02:00)	Diouf 20'; Nonda 90+2'		Conte 30'; Zambrotta 73'	Stadium: Stade de la Route de Lorient; Attendance: 11,427; Referee: Vítor Melo Pereira (Portugal)

=== UEFA Cup ===
==== First round ====
16 September 1999 First leg	Omonia (Cyprus)	2–5	(Italy) Juventus	Nicosia, Cyprus
20:00 CEST (UTC+02:00)	Tittel (yellow card) 4'; Kontolefteros 76', 87'	Report	Inzaghi 3', 17'; Kovačević 22'; Esnáider 25'; Montero (yellow card) 39'; Del Piero 82'	Stadium: GSP Stadium; Attendance: 16,000; Referee: Sergey Shmolik (Bulgaria)

30 September 1999 Second leg	Juventus (Italy)	5–0 (10–2 agg.)	(Cyprus) Omonia	Palermo, Italy
20:30 CEST (UTC+02:00)	Kovačević 20', 47', 86'; Tacchinardi 55'; Conte 90'	Report	Andreou (yellow card) 49'	Stadium: Stadio La Favorita; Attendance: 30,000; Referee: Sorin Corpodean (Romania)

==== Second round ====
21 October 1999 First leg	Levski Sofia (Bulgaria)	1–3	(Italy) Juventus	Sofia, Bulgaria
18:00 CEST (UTC+02:00)	Yoffou (yellow card) 33', (goal) 55'; Pažin (yellow card) 78' (yellow-red card)	Report	Bachini (yellow card) 15' (yellow-red card); Oliseh 23'; Conte (yellow card) 51'; Kovačević 52', 88', (yellow card) 57'	Stadium: Georgi Asparuhov Stadium; Attendance: 25,000; Referee: Jorge Emanuel Monteiro Coroado (Portugal)

4 November 1999 Second leg	Juventus (Italy)	1–1 (4–2 agg.)	(Bulgaria) Levski Sofia	Turin, Italy
20:45 CET (UTC+01:00)	Kovačević 79'	Report	Atanasov 15'	Stadium: Stadio delle Alpi; Attendance: 2,681; Referee: Frank De Bleeckere (Belgium)

==== Third round ====
25 November 1999 First leg	Olympiacos (Greece)	1–3	(Italy) Juventus	Athens, Greece
18:45 CET (UTC+01:00)	Giannakopoulos 15', (yellow card) 41'; Poursaitides (yellow card) 64'; Antzas (yellow card) 74'	Report	Tudor 28', (yellow card) 47'; Kovačević 67', (yellow card) 90'; Davids (yellow card) 77'; Inzaghi 88'	Stadium: Olympic Stadium; Attendance: 30,000; Referee: Rune Pedersen (Norway)

7 December 1999 Second leg	Juventus (Italy)	1–2 (4–3 agg.)	(Greece) Olympiacos	Palermo, Italy
18:00 CET (UTC+01:00)	Kovačević 1'; Tudor (yellow card) 29'	Report	Đorđević 37', 84' (pen.); Poursaitidis (yellow card) 85'	Stadium: Stadio La Favorita; Attendance: 22,000; Referee: Juan Fernández Marin (Spain)

==== Fourth round ====
2 March 2000 First leg	Juventus (Italy)	1–0	(Spain) Celta Vigo	Turin, Italy
20:45 CET (UTC+01:00)	Kovačević 50'; Montero (yellow card) 64'; Zambrotta (yellow card) 83'	Report	Juanfran (yellow card) 25'; Sergio (yellow card) 59'; Mostovoi (yellow card) 90'	Stadium: Stadio delle Alpi; Attendance: 10,000; Referee: Hellmut Krug (Germany)

9 March 2000 Second leg	Celta Vigo (Spain)	4–0 (4–1 agg.)	(Italy) Juventus	Vigo, Spain
21:00 CET (UTC+01:00)	Makélélé 1'; Mostovoi (yellow card) 9'; Birindelli 32' (o.g.); McCarthy 47', 68'; Mazinho (yellow card) 88'	Report	Davids (yellow card) 25'; Conte (yellow card) 27' (yellow-red card); Birindelli (yellow card) 29'; Montero (red card) 45'; Kovačević (yellow card) 56'; Tacchinardi (yellow card) 65'	Stadium: Balaídos; Attendance: 30,000; Referee: Hugh Dallas (Scotland)

== Statistics ==
=== Players statistics ===
No.	Pos	Nat	Player	Total		Serie A		Coppa		UEFA	
No.	Pos	Nat	Player	Apps	Goals	Apps	Goals	Apps	Goals	Apps	Goals
1	GK	(Netherlands) NED	van der Sar	46	-34	32	-18	3	-4	11	-12
13	DF	(Italy) ITA	Iuliano	42	0	32	0	2	0	7+1	0
2	DF	(Italy) ITA	Ferrara	41	1	31	1	1	0	9	0
4	DF	(Uruguay) URU	Montero	40	0	28	0	2	0	7+3	0
7	DF	(Italy) ITA	Pessotto	44	1	25+5	1	4	0	5+5	0
23	MF	(Italy) ITA	Zambrotta	46	3	24+8	1	2	0	7+5	2
20	MF	(Italy) ITA	Tacchinardi	45	3	27+3	0	3	0	11+1	3
21	MF	(France) FRA	Zidane	41	5	32	4	3	1	2+4	0
26	MF	(Netherlands) NED	Davids	38	1	27	1	3	0	8	0
9	FW	(Italy) ITA	Inzaghi	43	26	32+1	15	2	1	6+2	10
10	FW	(Italy) ITA	Del Piero	45	12	34	9	2	1	5+4	2
12	GK	(Italy) ITA	Rampulla	7	-5	2+1	-1	1	-1	3	-3
8	MF	(Italy) ITA	Conte	38	7	28	4	2	1	7+1	2
28	DF	(Croatia) CRO	Tudor	28	2	7+10	1	2	0	7+2	1
15	DF	(Italy) ITA	Birindelli	38	0	4+18	0	4	0	8+4	0
18	FW	(Federal Republic of Yugoslavia) YUG	Kovacevic	44	20	3+23	6	4	3	13+1	11
5	MF	(Nigeria) NGR	Oliseh	19	1	2+6	0	1	0	10	1
14	MF	(Italy) ITA	Bachini	20	0	2+4	0	4	0	10	0
3	DF	(Federal Republic of Yugoslavia) YUG	Mirkovic	22	0	1+7	0	4	0	9+1	0
19	FW	(Argentina) ARG	Esnaider	13	2	1+5	0	2	1	4+1	1
24	MF	(Italy) ITA	Maresca	1	0	0+1	0	0	0	0	0
11	FW	(Uruguay) URU	Fonseca	1	0	0	0	1	0	0	0
17	MF	(Republic of Ireland) IRL	Ronnie O'Brien	0	0	0	0	0	0	0	0
22	GK	(Sweden) SWE	Isaksson	0	0	0	0	0	0	0	0
25	MF	(Italy) ITA	Perrotta	0	0	0	0	0	0	0	0
27	FW	(Italy) ITA	Rigoni	0	0	0	0	0	0	0	0
34	GK	(Italy) ITA	D'Amico	0	0	0	0	0	0	0	0
29	FW	(Italy) ITA	Sculli	0	0	0	0	0	0	0	0

- Source: http://calcio-seriea.net/presenze/1999/1166/
