= 2002–03 Juventus FC season =

Italian football club season

Juventus
2002–03 season
- President: Vittorio Chiusano
- Manager: Marcello Lippi
- Stadium: Stadio delle Alpi
- Serie A: 1st
- Supercoppa Italiana: Winners
- Coppa Italia: Quarter-finals
- UEFA Champions League: Runners-up
- Top goalscorer: League: Alessandro Del Piero (16); All: Alessandro Del Piero (23)
- Average home league attendance: 39,771
Home colours	Away colours

The 2002–03 season was Juventus's 105th in existence and 101st consecutive season in the top flight of Italian football.

Juventus enjoyed much success, with Marcello Lippi guiding the team to the Serie A title for the second season in a row, finishing seven points ahead of Inter and 11 in front of A.C. Milan and, in Europe, reaching the Champions League Final after eliminating powerhouses like Real Madrid en route. In the all-Italian final, Juventus faced Milan and were beaten in a penalty shoot-out after a goalless draw. It was the fourth time that Lippi had led Juventus to the Champions League final (winning in 1996 but losing in 1997 and 1998).

Lippi employed the 4–3–1–2 formation for most of the season, with Pavel Nedvěd in the role of trequartista instead of his usual left midfield position. Nedvěd had one of the best seasons of his career and was awarded the 2003 Ballon d'Or in the wake of his performances. Unfortunately for the club, he was ruled out of the Champions League final after receiving a yellow card in the second leg of the semi-final against Real Madrid, and his absence would be greatly felt.

== Players ==
=== Squad information ===
Note: Flags indicate national team as defined under FIFA eligibility rules; some limited exceptions apply. Players may hold more than one non-FIFA nationality.

No.	Pos.	Nation	Player
1	GK	ITA	Gianluigi Buffon
2	DF	ITA	Ciro Ferrara
3	MF	ITA	Alessio Tacchinardi
4	DF	URU	Paolo Montero
5	DF	CRO	Igor Tudor
6	DF	ITA	Salvatore Fresi
7	DF	ITA	Gianluca Pessotto
8	MF	ITA	Antonio Conte
9	FW	CHI	Marcelo Salas
10	FW	ITA	Alessandro Del Piero (Captain)
11	MF	CZE	Pavel Nedvěd
12	GK	ITA	Antonio Chimenti

No.	Pos.	Nation	Player
13	DF	ITA	Mark Iuliano
14	MF	ITA	Cristian Zenoni
15	DF	ITA	Alessandro Birindelli
16	MF	ITA	Mauro Camoranesi
17	FW	FRA	David Trezeguet
18	FW	ITA	Marco Di Vaio
19	DF	ITA	Gianluca Zambrotta
21	DF	FRA	Lilian Thuram
22	GK	FRA	Landry Bonnefoi
23	MF	URU	Rubén Olivera
25	FW	URU	Marcelo Zalayeta
26	MF	NED	Edgar Davids
37	MF	ITA	Matteo Paro

=== Transfers ===
In
Pos.	Name	from	Type
MF	Manuele Blasi	Perugia	€17.7 million
MF	Mauro Camoranesi	Hellas Verona	€8.5 million
FW	Marco Di Vaio	Parma	loan
MF	Ruben Olivera	Danubio	
DF	Salvatore Fresi	Bologna	
GK	Antonio Chimenti	Lecce	
DF	Emiliano Moretti	Fiorentina	
MF	Davide Baiocco	Perugia	

Out
Pos.	Name	To	Type
MF	Matteo Brighi	Parma	€5 million
DF	Michele Paramatti	Bologna	
GK	Michelangelo Rampulla		retired
GK	Fabian Carini	Standard Liege	loan
FW	Nicola Amoruso	Perugia	loan
MF	Enzo Maresca	Piacenza	loan
MF	Manuele Blasi	Perugia	loan

==== Left club during season ====
Note: Flags indicate national team as defined under FIFA eligibility rules; some limited exceptions apply. Players may hold more than one non-FIFA nationality.

No.	Pos.	Nation	Player
20	MF	ITA	Davide Baiocco (on loan to Piacenza)
24	DF	ITA	Emiliano Moretti (on loan to Modena)

No.	Pos.	Nation	Player
33	DF	ITA	Mattia Cassani (to Sampdoria)

== Season review ==
On the field, the side coached by Marcello Lippi had a relatively slow start to the league season. They remained unbeaten in the first 12 matches, but this included five draws. The club's form suffered a blip at the beginning of autumn with two draws and two consecutive defeats, to Brescia and Lazio, between 23 November and 15 December. At this point of the season, with 14 matches played, Juventus were fourth in Serie A, trailing Inter, Lazio and Milan. On 22 December, a late Mauro Camoranesi goal at Perugia was needed to put an end to this winless streak.

From this moment on, the Bianconeri gained a momentum they sustained going into the new year, winning nine of their next ten matches. Unfortunately, the only fixture they failed to win during this period, a 1–1 draw against Atalanta in early February, was marred by a serious injury to Alessandro Del Piero, at a time when he had rediscovered his goalscoring touch. Del Piero subsequently missed two months of football. Even in his absence, la Vecchia Signora continued to prevail, though in a less dominant fashion. On 2 March, Juventus thrashed Inter 3–0, a result that took the club to top spot in the league, a position it would never leave. After the match, the Bianconeri lost only two more of their remaining matches and won most of the remainder, including an important success over Roma, who had been something of a bogey side for the Turin club in previous years.

The 27th league title of Juve's history was confirmed on 10 May following a 2–2 draw with Perugia — with two matches to play, second-placed Inter were no longer in a position to challenge for the Scudetto.

=== Europe ===
All three North Italian clubs succeeded in Europe. Along with the two Milan clubs, Juventus were one of the three Italian sides who appeared in the semi-finals that season. Juventus eliminated the only remaining non-Italian team, Real Madrid, to set up an all-Italian final with Milan, who had beaten Inter in the other semi-final. The final, played at Old Trafford in Manchester, ended 0–0 with Milan winning on penalties. Normally reliable goalscorer David Trezeguet was among the players who missed their attempts.

It was Juventus' best run in the competition since the 1997–98 season, where they had also been beaten finalists. However, the Bianconeri's run to the final actually involved a lot of tough moments. After impressing in the first group stage, topping their group (which included Feyenoord, Dynamo Kyiv and Newcastle United) and conceding just three goals in six matches (the best defence of all 32 teams competing), Juventus struggled in the second group stage.

Drawn in Group D alongside Basel, Deportivo La Coruña and Manchester United, Juventus were beaten by Manchester United both at Old Trafford and at home at the Stadio delle Alpi and also lost to Basel in Switzerland. Eventually, they scraped by as group runners-up behind Manchester United.

More epic games awaited them, with Barcelona next on their agenda. While struggling in their domestic league, Barcelona had impressed in both group stages, topping their group every time and establishing a new record of nine consecutive wins in the competition. The first leg of the quarter-final in Turin finished 1–1, Javier Saviola's 78th-minute goal equalising Paolo Montero's early goal. Barcelona appeared to be in a fine position heading into the second leg at the Camp Nou. There, Pavel Nedvěd scored first for Juventus, but the Catalans soon equalised through Xavi. When Edgar Davids was sent-off for repeated fouling, the Bianconeri were seemingly doomed. However, ten-man Juventus held on until extra time, and with six minutes left on the clock, substitute Marcelo Zalayeta scored a second goal to advance the club to the semi-finals.

Madrid had won three of the previous five editions of the competition and presented a star-studded squad with players such as Iker Casillas, Roberto Carlos, Luís Figo, Raúl, Ronaldo and former Juventus playmaker Zinedine Zidane. They had seen off the challenge of Manchester United in the quarter-finals and were in search of their tenth European Cup/Champions League title.

The first leg was played in Madrid on 6 May. Real Madrid scored with Ronaldo, but David Trezeguet equalised. The second half saw Roberto Carlos grab a second goal for the home side.

In the return leg on 14 May, Juventus set out to attack and were rewarded for their efforts with just 12 minutes gone. A fine collective move saw Gianluca Zambrotta cross from deep for Alessandro Del Piero, who headed back into the six-yard box for David Trezeguet to smash home. Just before half-time, Del Piero beat goalkeeper Casillas at his near post with a well-placed shot. Del Piero thus maintained his tradition of scoring key goals against Real Madrid, having already done so as a 21-year-old in a 1996 quarter-final tie.

Real Madrid earned a penalty after 65 minutes, but Gianluigi Buffon saved Luís Figo's effort, thus keeping his side's two-goal advantage. On 73 minutes, Pavel Nedvěd made it 3–0, but he received a yellow card for a rash challenge in the closing minutes of the match, meaning he would miss the final through suspension. On 89 minutes, Zidane, playing on the pitch which had been his home for five seasons, pulled one back for Real Madrid. The match ended 3–1 as Juventus qualified for the final.

=== Key players ===
For the league title, Nedvěd was considered the key player, also winning the European Player of the Year award. With five goals scored, he was — alongside Alessandro Del Piero — the club's joint top goalscorer in the Champions League.

Gianluigi Buffon, Lilian Thuram, Ciro Ferrara, Edgar Davids and Alessandro Del Piero all made key contributions to the squad, but the biggest surprise was Mauro Camoranesi. Signed from Hellas Verona in the summer of 2002, the Argentinian-born midfielder adapted with ease to his new surroundings and was one of the club's best players for the first seven months of the season. In April and May 2003, he suffered from a slight loss of form which did not change the fact that he had significantly contributed to a positive season for the club.

2001–02 topscorer David Trezeguet suffered from a knee injury in pre-season practice. He recovered strongly from this setback, but his absence gave the opportunity to Marcelo Zalayeta and Marco Di Vaio to play more matches than would be expected, with Zalayeta in particular scoring some key goals.

== Competitions ==
=== Supercoppa Italiana ===
25 August 2002	Juventus	2–1	Parma	Tripoli, Libya
21:00 CEST (UTC+02:00)	Del Piero 38', 73'	Report	Di Vaio 64'	Stadium: June 11 Stadium; Attendance: 40,000; Referee: Stefano Farina

=== Serie A ===
==== League table ====
Pos	Team	Pld	W	D	L	GF	GA	GD	Pts	Qualification or relegation
1	Juventus (C)	34	21	9	4	64	29	+35	72	Qualification to Champions League group stage
2	Internazionale	34	19	8	7	64	38	+26	65	Qualification to Champions League group stage
3	AC Milan	34	18	7	9	55	30	+25	61	Qualification to Champions League group stage
4	Lazio	34	15	15	4	57	32	+25	60	Qualification to Champions League third qualifying round
5	Parma	34	15	11	8	55	36	+19	56	Qualification to UEFA Cup first round

Source: Soccerway
Rules for classification: 1) points; 2) goal difference; 3) number of goals scored.
(C) Champions

==== Results summary ====
Overall								Home						Away					
Pld	W	D	L	GF	GA	GD	Pts	W	D	L	GF	GA	GD	W	D	L	GF	GA	GD
34	21	9	4	64	29	+35	72	12	4	1	37	14	+23	9	5	3	27	15	+12

Last updated: 24 May 2003.
Source: Competitive matches

==== Results by round ====
Round	1	2	3	4	5	6	7	8	9	10	11	12	13	14	15	16	17	18	19	20	21	22	23	24	25	26	27	28	29	30	31	32	33	34
Ground	H	A	H	H	A	H	A	A	H	A	H	A	A	H	A	H	A	H	A	H	A	A	H	A	H	A	H	A	H	H	A	H	A	H
Result	W	W	D	D	D	W	W	W	W	W	D	D	L	L	W	W	W	W	D	W	W	W	W	W	W	L	W	D	W	W	D	D	L	W
Position	2	2	3	3	5	3	3	3	2	1	2	4	4	5	5	4	4	3	3	2	1	1	1	1	1	1	1	1	1	1	1	1	1	1

Source: Competitive matches
A = Away; H = Home; W = Win; D = Draw; L = Loss; = Leader, 2003-04 UEFA Champions League group stage; = 2003-04 UEFA Champions League group stage; = 2003-04 UEFA Champions League qualifying round; = 2003-04 UEFA Cup; = 2003-04 Serie B

==== Matches ====
15 September 2002 2	Juventus	3–0	Atalanta	Turin
15:00 CEST (UTC+02:00)	Del Piero 27' (pen.), 34'; Fresi 90+1'	Report		Stadium: Stadio delle Alpi; Attendance: 38,315; Referee: Gianluca Paparesta

21 September 2002 3	Empoli	0–2	Juventus	Empoli
20:30 CEST (UTC+02:00)		Report	Del Piero 6' (pen.), 73'	Stadium: Stadio Carlo Castellani; Attendance: 18,700; Referee: Salvatore Racalbuto

28 September 2002 4	Juventus	2–2	Parma	Turin
18:00 CEST (UTC+02:00)	Tudor 87'; Del Piero 90+5'	Report	Nakata 66'; Adriano 81'; Lamouchi (red card) 88'	Stadium: Stadio delle Alpi; Attendance: 38,993; Referee: Stefano Cassarà

6 October 2002 5	Juventus	1–1	Como	Turin
15:00 CEST (UTC+02:00)	Zalayeta 88'	Report	Pecchia 65'	Stadium: Stadio delle Alpi; Attendance: 37,112; Referee: Paolo Bertini

19 October 2002 6	Internazionale	1–1	Juventus	Milan
20:30 CEST (UTC+02:00)	Morfeo (red card) 90+1'; Vieri 90+5'	Report	Del Piero 89' (pen.); Conte (red card) 90+1'	Stadium: San Siro; Attendance: 76,166; Referee: Pierluigi Collina

26 October 2002 7	Juventus	1–0	Udinese	Turin
20:30 CEST (UTC+02:00)	Salas 49'	Report		Stadium: Stadio delle Alpi; Attendance: 35,168; Referee: Paolo Bertini

3 November 2002 8	Modena	0–1	Juventus	Modena
15:00 CET (UTC+01:00)	Milanetto (yellow card) -' (yellow-red card) 83'	Report	Del Piero 74'	Stadium: Stadio Alberto Braglia; Attendance: 16,227; Referee: Salvatore Racalbuto

6 November 2002 1	Piacenza	0–1	Juventus	Piacenza
20:30 CET (UTC+01:00)		Report	Nedvěd 70'	Stadium: Stadio Leonardo Garilli; Attendance: 12,763; Referee: Matteo Trefoloni

10 November 2002 9	Juventus	2–1	AC Milan	Turin
20:30 CET (UTC+01:00)	Di Vaio 8'; Thuram 21'	Report	Pirlo 32' (pen.)	Stadium: Stadio delle Alpi; Attendance: 57,762; Referee: Gianluca Paparesta

17 November 2002 10	Torino	0–4	Juventus	Turin
20:30 CET (UTC+01:00)		Report	Del Piero 6'; Di Vaio 33'; Nedvěd 52'; Davids 89'	Stadium: Stadio delle Alpi; Attendance: 32,947; Referee: Massimo De Santis

23 November 2002 11	Juventus	1–1	Bologna	Turin
18:00 CET (UTC+01:00)	Iuliano 86'	Report	Signori 66' (pen.)	Stadium: Stadio delle Alpi; Attendance: 36,544; Referee: Stefano Farina

1 December 2002 12	Roma	2–2	Juventus	Rome
20:30 CET (UTC+01:00)	Totti 12' (red card) 90'; Cassano 44'; Candela (red card) 87'	Report	Del Piero 45+2'; Nedvěd 85'; Birindelli (red card) 87'	Stadium: Stadio Olimpico; Attendance: 74,313; Referee: Paolo Bertini

8 December 2002 13	Brescia	2–0	Juventus	Brescia
15:15 CET (UTC+01:00)	Schopp 78'; Tare 84'; Matuzalém (yellow card) -' (yellow-red card) 88'	Report		Stadium: Stadio Mario Rigamonti; Attendance: 19,714; Referee: Stefano Farina

15 December 2002 14	Juventus	1–2	Lazio	Turin
20:30 CET (UTC+01:00)	Nedvěd 34'	Report	Fiore 35', 50'	Stadium: Stadio delle Alpi; Attendance: 38,014; Referee: Emilio Pellegrino

22 December 2002 15	Perugia	0–1	Juventus	Perugia
15:00 CET (UTC+01:00)		Report	Camoranesi 90+1'	Stadium: Stadio Renato Curi; Attendance: 19,739; Referee: Luca Palanca

12 January 2003 16	Juventus	5–0	Reggina	Turin
15:00 CET (UTC+01:00)	Conte 21'; Trezeguet 34'; Cozza 64' (o.g.); Del Piero 71' (pen.); Di Vaio 83'	Report		Stadium: Stadio delle Alpi; Attendance: 35,735; Referee: Matteo Trefoloni

19 January 2003 17	Chievo	1–4	Juventus	Verona
20:30 CET (UTC+01:00)	Cossato 72'; Bierhoff (red card) 76'	Report	Trezeguet 11', 68', 86' (pen.); Del Piero 20' (pen.)	Stadium: Stadio Marc'Antonio Bentegodi; Attendance: 34,544; Referee: Salvatore Racalbuto

26 January 2003 18	Juventus	2–0	Piacenza	Turin
15:00 CET (UTC+01:00)	Del Piero 9'; Nedvěd 43'	Report	Rinaldi (yellow card) -' (yellow-red card) 83'	Stadium: Stadio delle Alpi; Attendance: 35,539; Referee: Cosimo Bolognino

2 February 2003 19	Atalanta	1–1	Juventus	Bergamo
15:00 CET (UTC+01:00)	Pinardi 40'; Doni (yellow card) -' (yellow-red card) 82'	Report	Di Vaio 51'	Stadium: Stadio Atleti Azzurri d'Italia; Attendance: 23,647; Referee: Emilio Pellegrino

8 February 2003 20	Juventus	1–0	Empoli	Turin
20:30 CET (UTC+01:00)	Trezeguet 7' (pen.)	Report		Stadium: Stadio delle Alpi; Attendance: 34,595; Referee: Marco Gabriele

16 February 2003 21	Parma	1–2	Juventus	Parma
15:00 CET (UTC+01:00)	Mutu 90'	Report	Di Vaio 13'; Tacchinardi 30'	Stadium: Stadio Ennio Tardini; Attendance: 23,451; Referee: Emilio Pellegrino

22 February 2003 22	Como	1–3	Juventus	Piacenza
18:00 CET (UTC+01:00)	Pecchia 79'	Report	Juárez 11' (o.g.); Di Vaio 22'; Camoranesi 43'	Stadium: Stadio Leonardo Garilli; Attendance: 8,377; Referee: Antonio Dattilo A.

2 March 2003 23	Juventus	3–0	Internazionale	Turin
20:30 CET (UTC+01:00)	Guglielminpietro 4' (o.g.); Nedvěd 34'; Camoranesi 83'	Report		Stadium: Stadio delle Alpi; Attendance: 57,393; Referee: Gianluca Paparesta

9 March 2003 24	Udinese	0–1	Juventus	Udine
15:00 CET (UTC+01:00)	Pinzi (red card) 60'	Report	Trezeguet 84'	Stadium: Stadio Friuli; Attendance: 26,694; Referee: Luca Palanca

15 March 2003 25	Juventus	3–0	Modena	Turin
20:30 CET (UTC+01:00)	Nedvěd 54', 83'; Trezeguet 85'	Report		Stadium: Stadio delle Alpi; Attendance: 36,921; Referee: Emidio Morganti

22 March 2003 26	AC Milan	2–1	Juventus	Milan
20:30 CET (UTC+01:00)	Shevchenko 4'; Inzaghi 25'	Report	Nedvěd 10'	Stadium: San Siro; Attendance: 78,671; Referee: Matteo Trefoloni

5 April 2003 27	Juventus	2–0	Torino	Turin
18:00 CEST (UTC+02:00)	Comotto 6' (o.g.); Tudor (red card) 42'; Tacchinardi 88'	Report	C. Lucarelli (red card) 42'; Mezzano (yellow card) -' (yellow-red card) 56'; Marinelli (yellow card) -' (yellow-red card) 67'	Stadium: Stadio delle Alpi; Attendance: 19,826; Referee: Massimo De Santis

13 April 2003 28	Bologna	2–2	Juventus	Bologna
20:30 CEST (UTC+02:00)	Cruz 15'; Locatelli 74'	Report	Zambrotta 87'; Camoranesi 90+5'	Stadium: Stadio Renato Dall'Ara; Attendance: 36,178; Referee: Gianluca Paparesta

19 April 2003 29	Juventus	2–1	Roma	Turin
20:30 CEST (UTC+02:00)	Del Piero 30' (pen.), 39'	Report	Montella 44'	Stadium: Stadio delle Alpi; Attendance: 42,592; Referee: Emilio Pellegrino

27 April 2003 30	Juventus	2–1	Brescia	Turin
15:00 CEST (UTC+02:00)	Del Piero 9', 86'	Report	Appiah 83'	Stadium: Stadio delle Alpi; Attendance: 40,881; Referee: Matteo Trefoloni

3 May 2003 31	Lazio	0–0	Juventus	Rome
15:00 CEST (UTC+02:00)		Report		Stadium: Stadio Olimpico; Attendance: 60,146; Referee: Pierluigi Collina

10 May 2003 32	Juventus	2–2	Perugia	Turin
15:00 CEST (UTC+02:00)	Trezeguet 25' (pen.); Di Vaio 46'	Report	Miccoli 36'; Grosso 90+2'	Stadium: Stadio delle Alpi; Attendance: 51,299; Referee: Paolo Bertini

17 May 2003 33	Reggina	2–1	Juventus	Reggio Calabria
15:00 CEST (UTC+02:00)	Di Michele 17'; Bonazzoli 51'	Report	Zalayeta 23'	Stadium: Stadio Oreste Granillo; Attendance: 26,182; Referee: Gianluca Paparesta

24 May 2003 34	Juventus	4–3	Chievo	Turin
15:00 CEST (UTC+02:00)	Zalayeta 16', 57'; Trezeguet 70'; C. Zenoni 87'	Report	Bierhoff 62', 74', 79'; D'Anna (red card) 72'	Stadium: Stadio delle Alpi; Attendance: 39,417; Referee: Tiziano Pieri

=== Coppa Italia ===
==== Round of 16 ====
5 December 2002 First leg	Reggina	0–2	Juventus	Reggio Calabria
21:00 CET (UTC+01:00)		Report	Salas 66' (pen.); Zalayeta 90+1'	Stadium: Stadio Oreste Granillo; Referee: Emidio Morganti

18 December 2002 Second leg	Juventus	0–1 (2–1 agg.)	Reggina	Turin
17:30 CET (UTC+01:00)		Report	Maffucci 21'; Alderuccio (yellow card) 85' (yellow-red card)	Stadium: Stadio delle Alpi; Referee: Daniele Tombolini

==== Quarter-finals ====
15 January 2003 First leg	Juventus	1–2	Perugia	Turin
21:00 CET (UTC+01:00)	Zalayeta 43'	Report	Miccoli 44', 53'	Stadium: Stadio delle Alpi; Referee: Massimiliano Saccani

23 January 2003 Second leg	Perugia	2–0 (4–1 agg.)	Juventus	Perugia
21:00 CET (UTC+01:00)	Miccoli 84'; Zé Maria 90' (pen.)	Report		Stadium: Stadio Renato Curi; Referee: Gianluca Paparesta

=== UEFA Champions League ===
==== Group stage ====
Pos	Team	Pld	W	D	L	GF	GA	GD	Pts	Qualification	JUV	NEW	DK	FEY
1	(Italy) Juventus	6	4	1	1	12	3	+9	13	Advance to second group stage	—	2–0	5–0	2–0
2	(England) Newcastle United	6	3	0	3	6	8	−2	9	Advance to second group stage	1–0	—	2–1	0–1
3	(Ukraine) Dynamo Kyiv	6	2	1	3	6	9	−3	7	Transfer to UEFA Cup	1–2	2–0	—	2–0
4	(Netherlands) Feyenoord	6	1	2	3	4	8	−4	5		1–1	2–3	0–0	—

Source: UEFA

18 September 2002 1	Feyenoord (Netherlands)	1–1	(Italy) Juventus	Rotterdam, Netherlands
20:45 CEST (UTC+02:00)	Emerton (yellow card) 18'; Van Hooijdonk 75'; Kalou (yellow card) 85'	Report	Ferrara (yellow card) 10'; Camoranesi 32'; Fresi (yellow card) 73'; Nedvěd (yellow card) 74'	Stadium: De Kuip; Attendance: 40,759; Referee: Antonio Jesús López Nieto (Spain)

24 September 2002 2	Juventus (Italy)	5–0	(Ukraine) Dynamo Kyiv	Turin, Italy
20:45 CEST (UTC+02:00)	Ferrara (yellow card) 5'; Di Vaio 14', 52'; Del Piero 22'; Tacchinardi (yellow card) 62'; Davids 67'; Nedvěd 79'	Report	Leko (yellow card) 68'	Stadium: Stadio delle Alpi; Attendance: 26,876; Referee: Wolfgang Stark (Germany)

1 October 2002 3	Juventus (Italy)	2–0	(England) Newcastle United	Turin, Italy
20:45 CEST (UTC+02:00)	Del Piero 66', 81'; Iuliano (yellow card) 73'	Report	Dabizas (yellow card) 64'	Stadium: Stadio delle Alpi; Attendance: 41,424; Referee: René Temmink (Netherlands)

23 October 2002 4	Newcastle United (England)	1–0	(Italy) Juventus	Newcastle upon Tyne, England
20:45 CEST (UTC+02:00)	Griffin 62'	Report	Tacchinardi (yellow card) 71'	Stadium: St James' Park; Attendance: 48,370; Referee: Rune Pedersen (Norway)

29 October 2002 5	Juventus (Italy)	2–0	(Netherlands) Feyenoord	Turin, Italy
20:45 CET (UTC+01:00)	Di Vaio 4', 69'; Tacchinardi (yellow card) 26'	Report	Ono (yellow card) 21'; Rząsa (yellow card) 24'; Paauwe (yellow card) 33'; Bombarda (yellow card) 52'	Stadium: Stadio delle Alpi; Attendance: 35,789; Referee: Gilles Veissière (France)

13 November 2002 6	Dynamo Kyiv (Ukraine)	1–2	(Italy) Juventus	Kyiv, Ukraine
20:45 CET (UTC+01:00)	Shatskikh 50'	Report	Salas 53'; Olivera (yellow card) 55'; Zalayeta 61'	Stadium: Olimpiyskyi National Sports Complex; Attendance: 76,000; Referee: Claus Bo Larsen (Denmark)

==== Second group stage ====
Pos	Team	Pld	W	D	L	GF	GA	GD	Pts	Qualification	MU	JUV	BAS	DEP
1	(England) Manchester United	6	4	1	1	11	5	+6	13	knockout stage	—	2–1	1–1	2–0
2	(Italy) Juventus	6	2	1	3	11	11	0	7	knockout stage	0–3	—	4–0	3–2
3	(Switzerland) Basel	6	2	1	3	5	10	−5	7		1–3	2–1	—	1–0
4	(Spain) Deportivo La Coruña	6	2	1	3	7	8	−1	7		2–0	2–2	1–0	—

Source: UEFA

26 November 2002 1	Deportivo La Coruña (Spain)	2–2	(Italy) Juventus	A Coruña, Spain
20:45 CET (UTC+01:00)	Tristán 9'; Makaay 11'; Martín (yellow card) 28'; Capdevila (yellow card) 83'; Scaloni (yellow card) 89'	Report	Davids (yellow card) 22'; Birindelli 38'; Montero (yellow card) 55'; Nedvěd 57'; Tacchinardi (yellow card) 58'	Stadium: Estadio Riazor; Attendance: 32,000; Referee: Herbert Fandel (Germany)

11 December 2002 2	Juventus (Italy)	4–0	(Switzerland) Basel	Turin, Italy
20:45 CET (UTC+01:00)	Trezeguet 3'; Montero 34'; Tacchinardi 43'; Del Piero 51' (pen.); Iuliano (yellow card) 53'	Report	Esposito (yellow card) 50'; H. Yakin (yellow card) 70'	Stadium: Stadio delle Alpi; Attendance: 22,639; Referee: Lucílio Batista (Portugal)

19 February 2003 3	Manchester United (England)	2–1	(Italy) Juventus	Manchester, England
20:45 CET (UTC+01:00)	Brown 4'; Scholes (yellow card) 36'; Keane (yellow card) 80'; Van Nistelrooy 85'	Report	Davids (yellow card) 19'; Tacchinardi (yellow card) 45+2'; Nedvěd 90+2'	Stadium: Old Trafford; Attendance: 66,703; Referee: Kim Milton Nielsen (Denmark)

25 February 2003 4	Juventus (Italy)	0–3	(England) Manchester United	Turin, Italy
20:45 CET (UTC+01:00)	Nedvěd (yellow card) 89'	Report	P. Neville (yellow card) 12'; Giggs 15', 41'; Van Nistelrooy 63'	Stadium: Stadio delle Alpi; Attendance: 59,111; Referee: Markus Merk (Germany)

12 March 2003 5	Juventus (Italy)	3–2	(Spain) Deportivo La Coruña	Turin, Italy
20:45 CET (UTC+01:00)	Ferrara 12'; Trezeguet 63'; Tacchinardi (yellow card) 67'; Montero (yellow card) 79'; Davids (yellow card) 90+2'; Tudor 90+3'	Report	Tristán 34'; Makaay 52'	Stadium: Stadio delle Alpi; Attendance: 25,070; Referee: Anders Frisk (Sweden)

18 March 2003 6	Basel (Switzerland)	2–1	(Italy) Juventus	Basel, Switzerland
20:45 CET (UTC+01:00)	Cantaluppi 38'; Giménez 90+2'	Report	Tacchinardi 10'	Stadium: St. Jakob-Park; Attendance: 30,501; Referee: Wolfgang Stark (Germany)

==== Knockout stage ====
===== Quarter-finals =====
9 April 2003 First leg	Juventus (Italy)	1–1	(Spain) Barcelona	Turin, Italy
20:45 CEST (UTC+02:00)	Montero 16'; Birindelli (yellow card) 76'	Report	Kluivert (yellow card) 61'; Gabri (yellow card) 69'; Saviola 78'	Stadium: Stadio delle Alpi; Attendance: 48,783; Referee: Ľuboš Micheľ (Slovakia)

22 April 2003 Second leg	Barcelona (Spain)	1–2 (a.e.t.) (2–3 agg.)	(Italy) Juventus	Barcelona, Spain
20:45 CEST (UTC+02:00)	Xavi 66'; Luis Enrique (yellow card) 76'; Gerard (yellow card) 106'; Motta (yellow card) 117'	Report	Zambrotta (yellow card) 20'; Montero (yellow card) 21'; Nedvěd 53'; Davids (yellow card) 33' (yellow-red card) 79'; Tacchinardi (yellow card) 94'; Zalayeta 114'; Buffon (yellow card) 117'	Stadium: Camp Nou; Attendance: 98,000; Referee: Graham Poll (England)

===== Semi-finals =====
6 May 2003 First leg	Real Madrid (Spain)	2–1	(Italy) Juventus	Madrid, Spain
20:45 CEST (UTC+02:00)	Ronaldo 23'; Roberto Carlos 73'	Report	Birindelli (yellow card) 29'; Iuliano (yellow card) 31'; Zambrotta (yellow card) 35'; Trezeguet 45'; Conte (yellow card) 57'; Ferrara (yellow card) 79'	Stadium: Santiago Bernabéu; Attendance: 75,000; Referee: Terje Hauge (Norway)

14 May 2003 Second leg	Juventus (Italy)	3–1 (4–3 agg.)	(Spain) Real Madrid	Turin, Italy
20:45 CEST (UTC+02:00)	Trezeguet 12'; Del Piero 43'; Montero (yellow card) 58'; Tacchinardi (yellow card) 64'; Nedvěd 73' (yellow card) 82'	Report	Conceição (yellow card) 23'; Salgado (yellow card) 58'; Hierro (yellow card) 75'; Figo (yellow card) 86'; Zidane 89'	Stadium: Stadio delle Alpi; Attendance: 67,299; Referee: Urs Meier (Switzerland)

===== Final =====
28 May 2003 Final	Juventus (Italy)	0–0 (a.e.t.) (2–3 p)	(Italy) AC Milan	Manchester, England
20:45 CEST (UTC+02:00)	Tacchinardi (yellow card) 69'; Del Piero (yellow card) 111'	Report	Costacurta (yellow card) 18'	Stadium: Old Trafford; Attendance: 63,215; Referee: Markus Merk (Germany)
	Penalties
	Trezeguet (penalty missed); Birindelli (penalty scored); Zalayeta (penalty missed); Montero (penalty missed); Del Piero (penalty scored)		(penalty scored) Serginho; (penalty missed) Seedorf; (penalty missed) Kaladze; (penalty scored) Nesta; (penalty scored) Shevchenko

== Statistics ==
=== Appearances and goals ===
No.	Pos	Nat	Player	Total		Serie A		Coppa		Champions League	
No.	Pos	Nat	Player	Apps	Goals	Apps	Goals	Apps	Goals	Apps	Goals
1	GK	(Italy) ITA	Buffon	47	-39	32	-23	0	0	15	-16
21	DF	(France) FRA	Thuram	42	1	26+1	1	0	0	15	0
2	DF	(Italy) ITA	Ferrara	37	1	24+1	0	0	0	11+1	1
4	DF	(Uruguay) URU	Montero	34	2	19+2	0	0	0	13	2
19	DF	(Italy) ITA	Zambrotta	42	1	21+5	1	3	0	10+3	0
16	MF	(Argentina) ARG	Camoranesi	44	5	24+6	4	1	0	11+2	1
3	MF	(Italy) ITA	Tacchinardi	42	4	22+5	2	2	0	13	2
26	MF	(Netherlands) NED	Davids	41	2	25+1	1	0	0	14+1	1
11	MF	(Czech Republic) CZE	Nedved	45	14	27+2	9	1	0	15	5
10	FW	(Italy) ITA	Del Piero	37	21	20+4	16	0	0	12+1	5
18	FW	(Italy) ITA	Di Vaio	40	11	18+8	7	3	0	9+2	4
12	GK	(Italy) ITA	Chimenti	10	-14	2+2	-6	4	-5	2	-3
13	DF	(Italy) ITA	Iuliano	30	1	19+2	1	1	0	7+1	0
15	DF	(Italy) ITA	Birindelli	34	1	14+3	0	4	0	9+4	1
17	FW	(France) FRA	Trezeguet	28	13	14+3	9	1	0	8+2	4
8	MF	(Italy) ITA	Conte	27	1	12+6	1	2	0	3+4	0
25	FW	(Uruguay) URU	Zalayeta	35	8	11+11	4	4	2	2+7	2
7	DF	(Italy) ITA	Pessotto	28	0	9+8	0	4	0	2+5	0
5	DF	(Croatia) CRO	Tudor	27	2	8+6	1	2	0	7+4	1
9	FW	(Chile) CHI	Salas	19	3	7+4	1	4	1	1+3	1
24	DF	(Italy) ITA	Moretti	14	0	5+3	0	3	0	2+1	0
20	DF	(Italy) ITA	Baiocco	15	0	5+2	0	4	0	2+2	0
6	DF	(Italy) ITA	Fresi	16	1	4+5	1	4	0	1+2	0
14	MF	(Italy) ITA	Zenoni	19	1	4+9	1	4	0	2	0
23	MF	(Uruguay) URU	Olivera	7	0	1+2	0	2	0	1+1	0
37	DF	(Italy) ITA	Paro	5	0	1	0	3	0	0+1	0
22	GK	(France) FRA	Bonnefoi	0	0	0	0	0	0	0	0
27	MF	(Italy) ITA	Brighi	0	0	0	0	0	0	0	0
33	DF	(Italy) ITA	Cassani	1	0	0	0	0	0	0+1	0
29	FW	(Haiti) HAI	Bertin								

- Source: http://calcio-seriea.net/presenze/2002/1229/

=== Overall statistics ===
	Total	Home	Away
Games played	34	17	17
Games won	21	12	9
Games drawn	9	4	5
Games lost	4	1	3
Biggest win	5–0 vs Reggina	5–0 vs Reggina	4–0 vs Torino
Biggest loss	0-2 vs Brescia	1–2 vs Lazio	0-2 vs Brescia
Clean sheets	15	8	7
Goals scored	64	37	27
Goals conceded	29	14	15
Goal difference	+35	+23	+12
Average GF per game	1.88	2.18	1.59
Average GA per game	0.85	0.82	0.88
Yellow cards	40		
Red cards	3		
Most appearances	(Italy) Gianluigi Buffon (32)		
Top scorer	(Italy) Alessandro Del Piero (16)		
Worst discipline	(Italy) Alessandro Birindelli 7 (yellow card) 1 (red card)		
Penalties for	9/11 (81.82%)		
Penalties against	2/4 (50%)		
Points	72/102 (70.59%)	40/51 (62.5%)	32/51 (59.26%)
Winning rate	61.76%	70.59%	52.94%
