= 2002 Supercoppa Italiana =

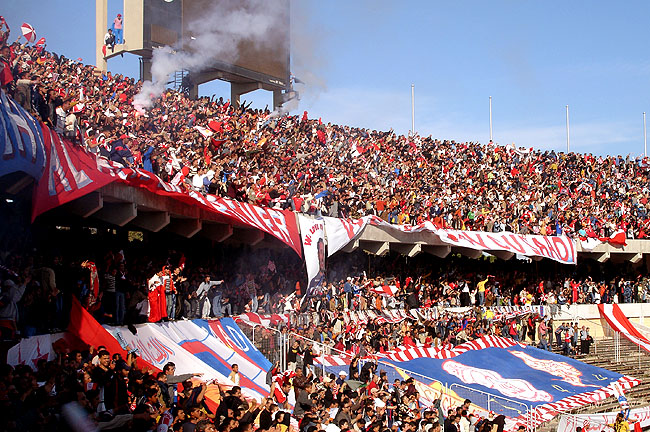
- Event: Supercoppa Italiana
Juventus	Parma
Serie A	Coppa Italia
2	1
- Date: 25 August 2002
- Venue: June 11 Stadium, Tripoli, Libya
- Referee: Stefano Farina
- Attendance: 40,000

The 2002 Supercoppa Italiana was a match contested by Juventus, the 2001–02 Serie A winner, and Parma, the 2001–02 Coppa Italia winner. It was the fifth appearance for Juventus (2 victories in 1995 and 1997) and the fourth for Parma (victory in 1999). The teams had already faced each other in the 1995 Supercoppa. The match was played in Tripoli, Libya and was only the second Supercoppa Italiana to be played outside of Italy, after the 1993 edition in the United States.

== Match details ==
25 August 2002
21:00 CET

Juventus	2–1	Parma
Del Piero 38', 73'	(Report)	Di Vaio 64'

June 11 Stadium, Tripoli
Attendance: 40,000
Referee: Stefano Farina

Juventus	Parma

JUVENTUS:
GK	1	(Italy) Gianluigi Buffon
RB	21	(France) Lilian Thuram
CB	13	(Italy) Mark Iuliano	Booked
CB	4	(Uruguay) Paolo Montero
LB	24	(Italy) Emiliano Moretti		(substituted off) 69'
RM	16	(Italy) Mauro Camoranesi	Booked	(substituted off) 46'
CM	3	(Italy) Alessio Tacchinardi
CM	20	(Italy) Davide Baiocco
LM	11	(Czech Republic) Pavel Nedvěd
CF	9	(Chile) Marcelo Salas		(substituted off) 72'
CF	10	(Italy) Alessandro Del Piero (c)
Substitutes:
GK	12	(Italy) Antonio Chimenti
DF	2	(Italy) Ciro Ferrara
DF	6	(Italy) Salvatore Fresi
DF	14	(Italy) Cristiano Zenoni
DF	15	(Italy) Alessandro Birindelli		(substituted on) 69'
MF	27	(Italy) Matteo Brighi		(substituted on) 46'
FW	25	(Uruguay) Marcelo Zalayeta		(substituted on) 72'
Manager:
(Italy) Marcello Lippi

PARMA:
GK	1	(France) Sébastien Frey
RB	2	(Italy) Aimo Diana	Booked
CB	21	(Italy) Matteo Ferrari
CB	5	(Italy) Daniele Bonera	Booked
LB	3	(Italy) Gianluca Falsini
RM	7	(Italy) Marco Marchionni
CM	8	(France) Sabri Lamouchi
CM	29	(Italy) Massimo Donati		(substituted off) 62'
LM	10	(Japan) Hidetoshi Nakata
SS	20	(Italy) Marco Di Vaio (c)
CF	9	(Brazil) Adriano		(substituted off) 46'
Substitutes:
GK	22	(Brazil) Claudio Taffarel
DF	16	(Brazil) Júnior
DF	24	(Italy) Sebastiano Siviglia
DF	28	(Italy) Paolo Cannavaro
MF	6	(Italy) Simone Barone		(substituted on) 62'
MF		(Brazil) Matuzalém
FW	11	(Italy) Emiliano Bonazzoli		(substituted on) 46'
Manager:
(Italy) Cesare Prandelli

MATCH OFFICIALS

- Assistant referees:
- Fourth official:

MATCH RULES

- 90 minutes.
- 30 minutes of extra-time if necessary.
- Penalty shoot-out if scores still level.
- Seven named substitutes
- Maximum of 3 substitutions.

== See also ==
- 2002–03 Juventus FC season
- 2002–03 Parma AC season
- 1995 Supercoppa Italiana - played between same teams
