= Alessio Tacchinardi =

Italian footballer (born 1975)

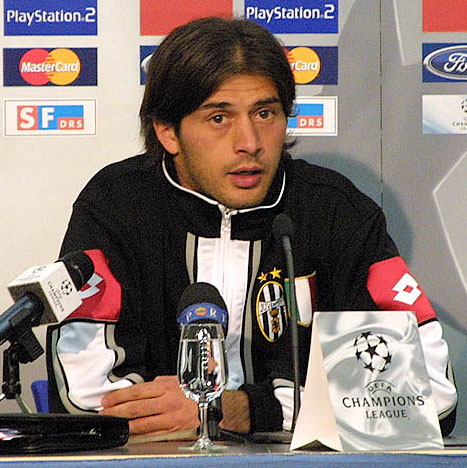
- Tacchinardi with Juventus in 2003

Personal information
- Date of birth: 23 July 1975 (age 51)
- Place of birth: Crema, Italy
- Height: 1.87 m (6 ft 2 in)
- Position: Midfielder

Youth career
- Atalanta

Senior career*
Years	Team	Apps	(Gls)
1992–1994	Atalanta	8	(0)
1994–2007	Juventus	261	(9)
2005–2007	→ Villarreal (loan)	45	(3)
2007–2008	Brescia	34	(9)
Total		348	(21)

International career
1995–2003	Italy	13	(0)

Managerial career
- 2009–2012: Pergolettese (youth)
- 2012–2013: Brescia (youth)
- 2013: Pergolettese
- 2015–2016: Pergolettese
- 2018: Lecco
- 2019: Crema
- 2021: Fano
- 2022: Lecco
Medal record
Association football
Representing Italy
European Under-21 Championship
Winner	1996 Spain
- * Club domestic league appearances and goals

Alessio Tacchinardi (Italian pronunciation: [aˈlɛssjo takkiˈnardi]; born 23 July 1975) is an Italian football manager and former footballer who played as a defensive midfielder, last in charge as head coach of Lecco.

He began his career with Atalanta. In 1994, he moved to Juventus, where he spent majority of his career, winning 17 trophies; due to his success and performances with the club, Tacchinardi was one of the 50 Juventus players to have their names written inside the club's new home ground, the Juventus Stadium. Following a two-year loan spell with Spanish side Villarreal, he moved to Brescia in 2007, where he retired after a season. A former Italy international, Tacchinardi represented his nation on 13 occasions between 1995 and 2003.

== Club career ==
=== Atalanta ===
Tacchinardi started his professional career in 1992 with Atalanta. He spent two full seasons with the Bergamo-based club, where he made 9 league appearances, including his Serie A debut. After performing extremely well, he caught the eye of the then Juventus director Luciano Moggi and was transferred to Juventus in July 1994.

=== Juventus ===
Tacchinardi joined Juventus in pre-season training in 1994. In his first season with the club, Tacchinardi made 25 league appearances, and also appeared in the Coppa Italia and the European Cup. Throughout his time with the club, he formed partnerships in midfield with the likes of Antonio Conte, Paulo Sousa, Didier Deschamps, Angelo Di Livio, Edgar Davids, Gianluca Zambrotta, Mauro Camoranesi, Pavel Nedvěd, Zinedine Zidane, and Enzo Maresca. During his time with the club, Tacchinardi was noted for his work-rate, determination, and wide range of skills.

In the 2002–03 season, he scored two goals in 27 appearances, and Juventus claimed the league title. He scored two more goals in 13 UEFA Champions League appearances, a run in which Juventus reached the UEFA Champions League final, lost on penalties to Milan. With his three Champions League final defeats, Tacchinardi is the player with the most Champions League final appearances without a victory, alongside former Juventus teammates Paolo Montero and Gianluigi Buffon, although, unlike the latter two players, he did win a Champions League medal during the 1995–96 season.

After nearly 14 years with Juventus, Tacchinardi made 261 league appearances with the Bianconeri, and scored 9 goals.

==== Loan to Villarreal ====
In July 2005, Tacchinardi was transferred to Villarreal CF who signed him on one-year loan from Juventus, following the appointment of Fabio Capello, who took over the managerial position from Marcello Lippi, and also due in part to the purchases of Patrick Vieira and Federico Balzaretti. He became an integral part of the starting XI for the club, helping the team to reach the UEFA Champions League semi-finals. He returned to Juventus on 30 June 2006, but following the Calciopoli troubles he extended his loan for one more year, in July 2006. His loan finished at the end of the 2006–07 season, in which he appeared for the club in more than 50 official matches, scoring 3 goals. He returned to Juventus again in the summer of 2007, and it was believed that he would remain at the club, following the appointment of Claudio Ranieri and the club's new start, however his contract was mutually terminated in August 2007, following certain unspecified disagreements with the club's new board of directors.

=== Brescia ===
Tacchinardi signed a two-year deal with Brescia Calcio on 9 August 2007, and was a key attribute to the Serie B club's first team, appearing in all but 8 league games, and scored 11 goals. At the conclusion of the 2007–08 Serie B season, Tacchinardi did not re-new his contract with Brescia Calcio and retired.

== International career ==
Tacchinardi also represented his nation at international level. He made his senior Italy national football team debut in a 1–0 win over Slovenia on 6 September 1995, but was also a member of the Italy under-21 team that won the 1996 UEFA European Under-21 Championship. Tacchinardi has been capped 13 official times for Italy with his last cap coming on 10 September 2003, in a 1–1 draw against Serbia and Montenegro. Tacchinardi was not a regular player for the Squadra Azzurra, never playing in the final stages of a major tournament, in several cases due to injury, but also because this was a period of many high quality Italian international midfielders. It is believed that Tacchinardi would have also been a key part of the national setup had it not been for several injuries.

== Coaching career ==
After retiring as a player, Tacchinardi started a career as a coach. His first job was as youth coach of Pergocrema; he then went on to accept another youth coaching role at Brescia.

In 2013 he was named new head coach of Pergolettese in the Lega Pro Seconda Divisione league, however resigning soon after. Later in 2015 he returned to Pergolettese, now in Serie D.

He then took on more Serie D roles, in 2018 at Lecco and 2019 at Crema, with little success.

On 22 March 2021, Tacchinardi was appointed new head coach of Serie C club Fano. He left the club at the end of the 2020–21 season as Fano was relegated to Serie D.

On 20 June 2022, Tacchinardi agreed to return to work with Lecco in the Serie C league. He was dismissed on 17 September 2022, after only three leagues games in charge of the club.

== Style of play ==
Tacchinardi primarily played as a central or defensive midfielder, although he was also capable of playing as a right-sided winger or wing-back. He was noted for his powerful and accurate long range shooting, as well as his striking ability from volleys, which saw him score several goals from distance during his time with Juventus. A hard-working and tenacious player, with a strong mentality and a wide range of skills, he was predominantly known for his excellent positional sense, anticipation, and tactical intelligence, as well as his tackling ability, which made effective both offensively and defensively, and also allowed him to play as a centre-back on occasion in a zonal marking defensive system. In addition to his aforementioned attributes, he also possessed good technique, vision, and passing range, which allowed him to start attacking plays quickly with long balls after winning back possession, and also enabled him to function as a deep-lying playmaker for his team.

== Reception ==
After his retirement, Tacchinardi was included in Juventus 50 Legends whose names are written inside the club's new stadium, Juventus Stadium.

== Personal life ==
Alessio's elder brother, Massimiliano Tacchinardi, also briefly played professional football as a defender.

== Career statistics ==
=== Club ===
Appearances and goals by club, season and competition
Club	Season	League			National cup		Continental		Other		Total	
Club	Season	Division	Apps	Goals	Apps	Goals	Apps	Goals	Apps	Goals	Apps	Goals
Atalanta	1992–93	Serie A	1	0	—		—		—		1	0
Atalanta	1993–94	Serie A	8	0	2	0	—		—		10	0
Atalanta	Total		9	0	2	0	—		—		11	0
Juventus	1994–95	Serie A	24	0	7	0	7 (Note: Appearances in UEFA Cup)	0	—		38	0
Juventus	1995–96	Serie A	16	0	2	0	4 (Note: Appearances in UEFA Champions League)	0	1 (Note: Appearance in Supercoppa Italiana)	0	23	0
Juventus	1996–97	Serie A	19	1	3	0	10	0	3 (Note: One appearance in Intercontinental Cup, two appearances in UEFA Super Cup)	0	36	1
Juventus	1997–98	Serie A	23	1	8	0	10	0	1	0	42	1
Juventus	1998–99	Serie A	23	1	4	0	8	0	3 (Note: One appearance in Supercoppa Italiana, two appearances in UEFA Cup qualification)	0	38	1
Juventus	1999–2000	Serie A	30	0	3	0	12 (Note: Six appearances and two goals in UEFA Intertoto Cup, six appearances and one goal in UEFA Cup)	3	—		45	3
Juventus	2000–01	Serie A	31	2	2	0	5	0	—		38	2
Juventus	2001–02	Serie A	28	2	7	0	10	0	—		45	2
Juventus	2002–03	Serie A	27	2	2	0	13	2	1	0	43	4
Juventus	2003–04	Serie A	24	0	3	0	6	0	1	0	34	0
Juventus	2004–05	Serie A	16	0	2	0	6	0	—		24	0
Juventus	Total		261	9	43	0	91	5	9	0	405	14
Villarreal	2005–06	La Liga	23	2	1	0	10	0	—		34	2
Villarreal	2006–07	La Liga	22	1	3	0	2 (Note: Appearances in UEFA Intertoto Cup)	0	—		27	1
Villarreal	Total		45	3	4	0	12	0	—		61	3
Brescia	2007–08	Serie B	34	9	0	0	—		2 (Note: Appearances in Promotion play-off)	0	36	9
Career total			349	21	49	0	103	5	11	0	513	26

=== International ===
Appearances and goals by national team and year
National team	Year	Apps	Goals
Italy	1995	1	0
Italy	1996	0	0
Italy	1997	0	0
Italy	1998	0	0
Italy	1999	0	0
Italy	2000	2	0
Italy	2001	7	0
Italy	2002	1	0
Italy	2003	2	0
Total		13	0

== Honours ==
Juventus

- Serie A: 1994–95, 1996–97, 1997–98, 2001–02, 2002–03
- Coppa Italia: 1994–95; runner-up: 2001–02, 2003–04
- Supercoppa Italiana: 1995, 1997, 2002, 2003; runner-up: 1998, 2005
- UEFA Champions League: 1995–96; runner-up: 1996–97, 1997–98, 2002–03
- UEFA Super Cup: 1996
- Intercontinental Cup: 1996
- UEFA Intertoto Cup: 1999
- UEFA Cup runners-up: 1994–95

Individual

- Juventus FC Hall of Fame: 2025
