= Mark Iuliano =

Italian footballer and manager

Personal information
- Full name: Mark Iuliano
- Date of birth: 12 August 1973 (age 53)
- Place of birth: Cosenza, Italy
- Height: 1.87 m (6 ft 2 in)
- Position: Defender

Team information
- Current team: Udinese (Vice allenatore)

Senior career*
Years	Team	Apps	(Gls)
1990–1996	Salernitana	83	(1)
1992–1993	→ Bologna (loan)	24	(1)
1993–1994	→ Monza (loan)	16	(0)
1996–2005	Juventus	187	(7)
2005–2006	Real Mallorca	29	(4)
2006	Sampdoria	4	(0)
2006–2007	Messina	21	(0)
2008	Ravenna	10	(2)
2010–2012	San Genesio		

International career
1998–2003	Italy	19	(1)

Managerial career
- 2012–2014: Pavia (youth)
- 2014–2015: Latina Primavera
- 2015: Latina
- 2017: Como
- 2017: Partizani Tirana
- 2018: Udinese (assistant)
Medal record
Representing Italy
Men's football
UEFA European Championship
Runner-up	2000 Belgium-Netherlands
- * Club domestic league appearances and goals

Mark Iuliano Cavaliere OMRI (Italian pronunciation: [ˈmark juˈljaːno]; born 12 August 1973) is an Italian football manager and a former professional footballer who played as a defender. Following his retirement he worked as a coach. Iuliano spent the bulk of his playing career with, Juventus, in Serie A, a club with which he won several domestic and international trophies. At international level, he represented the Italy national football team at UEFA Euro 2000, reaching the final, and at the 2002 FIFA World Cup.

== Club career ==
=== Salernitana ===
Born in Cosenza, Mark Iuliano started his professional football career with Salernitana Calcio in 1990. He would transfer to Bologna FC on a season loan deal in 1992 and scored 1 goal in 24 appearances. After returning to Salerno, he was again sent out on loan in 1993, for another season long loan deal. This time, Iuliano moved to AC Monza He would go on to make 16 appearances for the club. After two impressive loan spells in Bologna and Monza, Iuliano returned to Salernitana Calcio, and became a regular starter after his return, making over 85 appearances, and scoring a single goal, playing both as a centre back and as a full back.

=== Juventus ===
After greatly impressing in his second spell with Salernitana, Iuliano caught the eye of several major scouts, most notably those of Serie A giants Juventus. In July 1996, Iuliano transferred to the Turin based outfit, and was a big hit right from the start, as Juventus continued their Serie A and European dominance. He made his Serie A début on 15 September 1996, 2–1 win over Cagliari Calcio. In his first season with Juventus he played in 21 league games scoring a single goal in a 1–1 away draw against Atalanta on 23 May 1997, which saw Juventus claim the league title that season.

During the 1997–98 season, Iuliano became widely known for a controversial episode in Juventus's Derby d'Italia match in Turin against Inter on 26 April 1998, involving Ronaldo: a collision that occurred between the two players in the Juventus penalty area, which saw both players go to ground, led the Inter players to claim what they felt to be a clear penalty for a tackle of obstruction, but the referee let the play continue as the players continued to protest; to add to the controversy, Juventus were awarded a contested penalty only thirty seconds later. Although Juventus did not convert the penalty successfully, they still ended up winning the match 1–0, and went on to win the league title mathematically two days later, following a 3–2 home win against Bologna, with Inter finishing in second place.

Following the match, the referee who had officiated the game, Piero Ceccarini, also came out publicly and stated that he had made a mistake, and that he should have called the foul and assigned a penalty to Inter for the challenge, although that, at the time, he did not witness the entire play that led to the incident, only the collision between the two players, which drew further criticism from the press. The incident has therefore acquired a degree of infamy, and is still widely debated in the Italian media, and often cited in newspapers. When asked about the episode in a 2009 interview, Ceccarini changed his view and said that in hindsight he would have not awarded a penalty, but instead an indirect free kick to Inter inside the penalty area for obstruction. In an even more recent interview with the newspaper Il Tirreno in 2016, Ceccarini later further clarified, "From the images it is clear that Ronaldo runs into Iuliano, not vice versa: as a matter of fact, the Juventus player falls backwards, resulting from the impact of Ronaldo running into him. I was on the pitch, a few meters away. The intention of the defender was to stop the attacker's progression, but the attacker moved the ball and the defender did not follow it. Iuliano was stationary at the moment of contact, there are no doubts about this. I told Pagliuca (Inter's goalkeeper) that in basketball this would be an offensive foul. Perhaps I ought to have whistled a foul in favour of Juventus." In a 2015 interview, when Iuliano was asked about the incident, he stated that he felt that a penalty should not have been awarded, but that due to the speed at which the collision occurred, it was not immediately obvious what the correct decision should have been, and that it was also possible that an offensive foul could have been given against Inter.

Iuliano would become an eventual starter for the club the following season, but was hampered by injuries in the 1999–2000 season, limiting him to just 20 appearances. Juventus had what was considered by some pundits to be one of, if not the best defence in the world at this time, and were known for their ability to concede very few goals, which made the side particularly effective in closely contested matches. Iuliano formed impressive defensive partnerships with the likes of Ciro Ferrara, Moreno Torricelli, Paolo Montero, Gianluca Pessotto, Lilian Thuram, Alessandro Birindelli, Igor Tudor, Gianluca Zambrotta, Nicola Legrottaglie, and Fabio Cannavaro during his 10-year tenure with the club. After the 2004–2005 Serie A triumph, veteran teammates Paolo Montero and Ciro Ferrara called it quits on their Juventus career (this title was later revoked following Juventus's involvement in the 2006 Calciopoli scandal). The Uruguayan opted to return to his homeland, while Iuliano remained, but in January 2005, he left for La Liga side RCD Mallorca on free transfer after having not played regularly in the first portion season. Iuliano made well over 200 total appearances for the Bianconeri, scoring nearly 15 goals. During his time at Juventus, Iuliano won four Serie A titles, an Intercontinental Cup, a UEFA Super Cup and three Italian Supercups, also reaching three UEFA Champions League finals (in 1997, 1998, and 2003) and two Coppa Italia finals (in 2002 and 2004).

=== Mallorca ===
Iuliano transferred to RCD Mallorca in the Spanish La Liga in the winter of 2005 after 10 years with Juventus. He would remain at the club for only one season however, despite a fairly decent season starting 29 total games and scoring 4 goals.

=== Sampdoria ===
Iuliano returned to Italy in January 2006, by transferring to Serie A club, UC Sampdoria. He remained at the Genoa based club for just a mere six months, before a July transfer away from Liguria after making just four appearances in the league.

=== Messina ===
After a disappointing period with Sampdoria, Iuliano moved to Sicilian club FC Messina Peloro in the summer of 2006. After two consecutive fairly impressive Serie A seasons, Messina failed to avoid relegation in the 2006–2007 Serie A season. Iuliano made a total of 24 appearances for the club between the Coppa Italia and the Serie A, and scored 1 goal. Following Messina's relegation to Serie B, Iuliano's contract was not renewed, and hence he became a free agent on 1 July 2007.

=== Ravenna ===
Iuliano was unable to find a club during the 2007 summer transfer window, and was linked with a return to former club Juventus, following their re-building of the club's squad. This news turned out to be just rumours, as the deal never took off, and Iuliano remained a free agent for the next 6 months. After those 6 months without a club, he signed for Serie B side Ravenna Calcio in January 2008. The veteran was instantly inserted into the starting eleven, and picked up good form before he failed a doping test after playing for Ravenna Calcio in a Serie B match against AC Cesena, in May 2008. After being found positive for cocaine he was successively disqualified for two years.

=== Retirement ===
After this series of events, Iuliano opted to call it quits on his career and officially retired from professional football in March 2012; he was 38 years old.

== International career ==
Iuliano was a regular in the Italy national team setup during the peak of his career, during the later 90s and early 2000s. After being called up for a friendly against Paraguay in April 1998, his senior international debut came later that year, in a Euro 2000 qualifier on 5 September, a 2–0 win against Wales in Liverpool. He scored his only international goal in a 2–0 friendly win against Portugal in Reggio Calabria, on 26 April 2000. Under manager Dino Zoff, he appeared for the Italy national team at UEFA Euro 2000, where he formed a strong defensive trio along with Fabio Cannavaro and Alessandro Nesta; Italy finished in second place, losing out to France 2–1 in the final following a golden goal. In the semi-final against co-hosts Netherlands, he conceded a penalty for a foul on club teammate Edgar Davids, which Patrick Kluivert proceeded to miss, hitting the post; following a 0–0 draw, Italy advanced 3–1 on penalties. Iualiano also took part at the 2002 FIFA World Cup under manager Giovanni Trapattoni, where they were eliminated by co-hosts South Korea in the round of 16, following a 2–1 defeat after a golden goal. He made 19 international appearances in total, scoring one goal for his country, with his final call-up coming in 2003; his final appearance came in a 1–1 friendly draw against Turkey on 20 November 2002, at the Stadio Adriatico.

== Style of play ==
Iuliano was a large, tenacious, and physically strong defender, who excelled in the air, and who was an accomplished man-marker and an experienced tackler; he usually played as a centre-back, although he was a tactically versatile player, who was also capable of playing as a full-back.

== Coaching career ==
After retirement, Iuliano took a role as youth coach for the Allievi Nazionali at Pavia in 2012. In July 2014, Iuliano was appointed youth coach at Serie B club Latina. On 5 January 2015, he was promoted head coach in place of Roberto Breda, with the goal to save the club from relegation. He was sacked in November 2015. On 26 May 2017, he was appointed has Como head coach. On 26 July 2017, Iuliano reached an agreement with Albanian Albanian Superliga club FK Partizani Tirana to become The Reds new head coach. On 24 April 2018, he was appointed new assistant coach of Udinese alongside new head coach Igor Tudor.

== Honours ==
Juventus

- Serie A: 1996–97, 1997–98, 2001–02, 2002–03
- Supercoppa Italiana: 1997, 2002, 2003
- UEFA Super Cup: 1996
- Intercontinental Cup: 1996
- UEFA Intertoto Cup: 1999
- UEFA Champions League runner-up: 1996–97, 1997–98, 2002–03

Italy

- UEFA European Championship runner-up: 2000

Orders

5th Class / Knight: Cavaliere Ordine al Merito della Repubblica Italiana: 2000
