= Davide Baiocco =

Italian footballer (born 1975)

Personal information
- Date of birth: 8 May 1975 (age 51)
- Place of birth: Perugia, Italy
- Height: 1.72 m (5 ft 8 in)
- Position: Defensive midfielder

Senior career*
| Years | Team | Apps | (Gls) |
| 1992–1994 | Gubbio | 34 | (0) |
| 1994–2002 | Perugia | 68 | (2) |
| 1996–1997 | → Fano (loan) | 28 | (2) |
| 1997–1998 | → Siena (loan) | 29 | (0) |
| 1998–2000 | → Viterbese (loan) | 52 | (3) |
| 2002–2005 | Juventus | 7 | (0) |
| 2003 | → Piacenza (loan) | 16 | (0) |
| 2003–2004 | → Reggina (loan) | 28 | (0) |
| 2004–2005 | → Perugia (loan) | 33 | (2) |
| 2005–2009 | Catania | 122 | (2) |
| 2009–2011 | Brescia | 59 | (1) |
| 2011–2012 | U.S. Siracusa | 29 | (2) |
| 2012–2014 | Cremonese | 29 | (0) |
| 2014 | Alessandria | 14 | (0) |
| 2014–2015 | Akragas | 28 | (0) |
| 2015–2017 | Siracusa Calcio | 35 | (1) |
| 2017 | Palazzolo | 10 | (0) |
| 2017–2018 | Biancavilla | 13 | (0) |
- * Club domestic league appearances and goals

Davide Baiocco (born 8 May 1975) is an Italian former footballer, who played as a midfielder, and current politician

== Football career ==
=== From Perugia to Juventus ===
A product of the Perugia youth system, he transferred to Juventus in January 2002 for 7.2 million euros, in a swap with Fabian O'Neill who went to Perugia. He arrived in the summer of 2002. He signed a four-and-a-half-year contract with Juventus, but failed to settle into the club and has been loaned out several times, to clubs including Piacenza and Reggina.

=== Return to Perugia ===
On 31 August 2004, he was signed by Perugia on loan with the option to purchase for a nominal fee.

=== From Catania to Siracusa ===
Due to the bankruptcy of Perugia, Baiocco joined the then Serie B side Catania in August 2005 and helped them gain promotion to the Serie A for the 2006/2007 season. Since then, he has become the club's captain and influential first-team player. He played with Catania until the end of the 2008–09 season.

From 2009 to 2011 he played for Brescia.

In the 2011–12 season, he played with U.S. Siracusa in Lega Pro Prima Divisione.

On 7 August 2012 Baiocco was signed by U.S. Cremonese. On 17 January 2014 he was signed by Alessandria in a 6-month contract.

Baiocco returned to Siracusa in 2015. The club won promotion to 2016–17 Lega Pro as Siracusa Calcio.

== Style of play ==
Baiocco was a dynamic, energetic, and versatile defensive midfielder known for his intelligence, tackling ability, and ability to carry the ball and push forward from midfield.

== Political career ==
In July 2023, Baiocco accepted to run as a mayoral candidate in Perugia for Popular Alternative, a party led by Terni mayor and former Ternana chairman Stefano Bandecchi, for the 2024 local election.
