= Alessandro Conticchio =

Italian footballer and manager (born 1974)

Personal information
- Date of birth: January 19, 1974 (age 52)
- Place of birth: Celleno, Italy
- Height: 1.72 m (5 ft 7 1/2 in)
- Position: Midfielder

Team information
- Current team: Catania (technical collaborator)

Senior career*
Years	Team	Apps	(Gls)
1994–1997	Gualdo	81	(5)
1997–2002	Lecce	149	(13)
2002–2005	Torino	95	(10)
2005–2007	Cagliari	30	(0)
2007–2008	Avellino	16	(0)

Managerial career
- 2011–2012: Viterbese
- * Club domestic league appearances and goals

Alessandro Conticchio (born 19 January 1974) is an Italian association football and former manager of Viterbese and former player, currently in charge as Cristiano Lucarelli's technical collaborator at Catania.

== Career ==
=== Player ===
Born in Celleno, Lazio region, Conticchio started his professional career at Gualdo of Umbria region, Lecce, Torino, Cagliari and Avellino.

=== Coach ===
In the season 2011–12 he has become, until the end of the season, the coach of Viterbese in Serie D, in place of the resigned Raffaele Sergio.

He then joined forces with former teammate Cristiano Lucarelli, serving at his assistant at Viareggio and Pistoiese, and as a technical collaborator at Tuttocuoio, Messina and most recently Catania.
