= Ciro Ferrara =

Italian footballer and manager (born 1967)

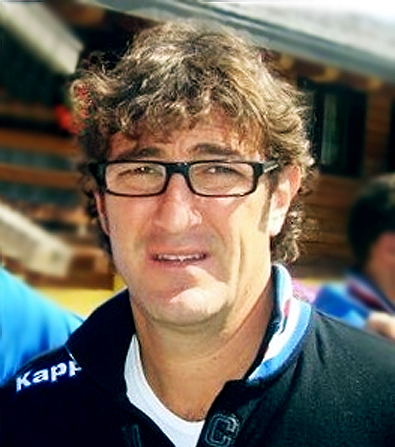
- Ferrara in 2012

Personal information
- Full name: Ciro Ferrara
- Date of birth: 11 February 1967 (age 59)
- Place of birth: Naples, Italy
- Height: 1.80 m (5 ft 11 in)
- Position: Defender

Youth career
- 1980–1984: Napoli

Senior career*
Years	Team	Apps	(Gls)
1984–1994	Napoli	247	(12)
1994–2005	Juventus	253	(15)
Total		500	(27)

International career
1985–1987	Italy U21	6	(1)
1988	Italy Olympic	5	(1)
1987–2000	Italy	49	(0)

Managerial career
- 2009–2010: Juventus
- 2010–2012: Italy U21
- 2012: Sampdoria
- 2016–2017: Wuhan Zall
Medal record
Men's Football
Representing Italy
UEFA European Championship
Third place	1988
FIFA World Cup
Third place	1990 Italy
UEFA European Championship
Runner-up	2000
- * Club domestic league appearances and goals

Ciro Ferrara Ufficiale OMRI (Italian pronunciation: [ˈtʃiːro ferˈraːra]; born 11 February 1967) is an Italian former professional footballer and manager. Ferrara spent his playing career as a defender, initially at Napoli and later on at Juventus, winning seven total Serie A titles as well as other domestic and international trophies.

His most recent position was as manager of Wuhan Zall. He had also previously coached Juventus and the Italy national under-21 team. As an assistant coach to Marcello Lippi, he won the 2006 FIFA World Cup with Italy.

At international level, he earned 49 caps for the Italian national team and represented the team at the 1988 Summer Olympics, at two UEFA European Championships, in 1988 and 2000, and at the 1990 World Cup.

== Club career ==
=== Napoli ===
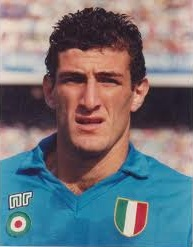
Ferrara with Napoli during the 1987–88 season

A native of Naples, Ferrara began his career with the youth system of hometown club Napoli in 1980. He graduated from the primavera youth squad in 1984 and began to earn first-team call-ups that season. He made 14 total appearances with the club in his first full season. The following season, Ferrara became a part of the starting XI, and he soon began earning call-ups to the Italy national team, making the squad for the 1990 FIFA World Cup. He also scored one of Napoli's goals as they won the 1989 UEFA Cup final. In addition to the UEFA Cup, with Napoli he won two Serie A titles (in 1986–87 and 1989–90), the 1987 Coppa Italia final, and the 1990 Supercoppa Italiana, the latter over his future team, Juventus.

=== Juventus ===
In the summer of 1994, Ferrara transferred to Turin-based club Juventus under coach Marcello Lippi, and was quickly introduced into the starting XI, making over 40 total appearances for the club in all competitions in his first season, scoring one goal. He is considered one of the best central defenders of his generation, not relinquishing his starting position for the club for the next ten years. He also captained the team from 1995 to 1996 and became one of the most experienced and decorated players of the past two decades, winning eight Serie A championships, six of which were with Juventus, and two with Napoli. Ferrara was also part of two Coppa Italia titles (one with each team), three Supercoppa Italiana titles (two with Juventus, one with Napoli) and several European competitions, including the UEFA Champions League, UEFA Cup, Intercontinental Cup and European Super Cup). His role as captain, however, was taken over by Alessandro Del Piero in 1996.

Throughout his Juventus career, Ferrara played an important role in the club's backline, with his vast experience and dominating defensive style. Throughout his 12-year tenure with the club, Ferrara formed impressive defensive partnerships with the likes of Mark Iuliano, Moreno Torricelli, Paolo Montero, Gianluca Pessotto, Lilian Thuram, Alessandro Birindelli, Igor Tudor, Gianluca Zambrotta, Nicola Legrottaglie and Fabio Cannavaro. Juventus had what was considered the best defence in the world at this time, and teams strongly regretted ever going down a goal to the club, as they knew how hard it would be to score one back for themselves. In the 1996–97 season, one of his peak seasons, he scored 4 goals in 32 Serie A matches, while also being capped eight times internationally. Following the Scudetto-winning season, Ferrara, along with veteran defensive teammates Mark Iuliano and Paolo Montero, ended their Juventus careers. While Montero returned to Uruguay and Iuliano opted to join smaller clubs to conclude his career, Ferrara retired from football altogether in May 2005 at age 38. He made just four Serie A appearances in his final season with the club. Following Juventus' involvement in the 2006 Italian football scandal, "Calciopoli", Juventus' 2004–05 title was later revoked.

== International career ==
In June 1987, Ferrara debuted for the Italian senior squad in a friendly match against Argentina. In 1988, he was a member of the Italy team that finished in fourth place at the 1988 Summer Olympics after reaching the semi-final.

== Style of play ==
Ferrara was known for his composure, anticipation, technical ability, and versatility as a defender. Although primarily a centre-back, he was capable of playing across the back line, including as a man-marker ("stopper") or as a right-back, allowing him to adapt to a variety of tactical systems. He is regarded as one of the leading Italian centre-backs of his generation. Welsh former winger Ryan Giggs described Ferrara and his defensive teammate at Juventus, Paolo Montero as "...the toughest defenders [he] played against", also adding that they were often very hard to face in their challenges, compared to Polish former midfielder Zbigniew Boniek, who has stated that Ferrara was the best defender that he ever faced. Described as a precocious talent in his youth, Ferrara later established himself as one of the best defenders in the world, in his prime. He was considered to be an experienced, consistent, cautious and successful defender, with a good positional sense, who was quick, athletic, strong in the air, a good tackler, and someone who excelled at reading the game and marking his opponents. These skills enabled him to be effective in both man-marking and zonal marking defensive systems. In addition to his defensive skills, he was also known for his offensive contribution as a centre-back, and he was also capable of playing as a sweeper. In spite of his tenacious playing style, he was also known to be a fair and correct player, and for his professionalism, leadership, strong personality, and his commanding presence both on the pitch and in the dressing room.

== Coaching career ==
Ferrara was part of the Italian technical staff for the 2006 World Cup. After winning the World Cup, he became part of Juventus' staff, joining former club and national teammate Gianluca Pessotto, with Ferrara being named youth system chief (responsabile settore giovanile), dealing mostly with organisational aspects of the Juve academy. In July 2008, Ferrara took the UEFA Pro License coaching badges following training at Coverciano, Florence. After Juventus fired Claudio Ranieri following a string of seven league games without a win in the 2008–09 season, Ferrara was named interim head coach of Juventus on 18 May 2009 for the remaining two weeks of the season, with the goal of maintaining second place in the league table, and the possibility of being appointed on a full-time basis for a longer period. In his two games as caretaker manager, he led Juventus to 3–0 and 2–0 wins over Siena and Lazio respectively, thus ensuring a second-place finish over rivals Milan. Following these results, he emerged as a strong candidate to take the job permanently for the next season. On 5 June 2009, Juventus formally announced his appointment as manager for the 2009–10 season.

During the summer, the team was then strengthened with high-profile signings such as Brazilian internationals Diego and Felipe Melo; 2006 World Cup champions Fabio Cannavaro and Fabio Grosso in defence; and young Uruguayan international Martín Cáceres, on loan. After winning his first four league matches, Ferrara's fortunes changed after Juve failed to make the knockout stage of the 2009–10 UEFA Champions League following a 4–1 defeat by Bayern Munich at home in a match where a draw would have awarded Juve the qualification to the following phase, despite a promising start to the campaign. Despite a win over Derby d'Italia rivals Internazionale, Juve embarked on a losing streak over the winter, notably against minor teams such as Sicilian side Catania and recently promoted Bari. He came under intense scrutiny from the media and there was much speculation about who would succeed him as manager, especially after he was absent at the traditional meeting of all Serie A managers, coaches and referees in Rome during mid-season and was instead represented by then-Juventus director of sport Alessio Secco and 23-year-old midfielder Claudio Marchisio at the press conference.

Six days later, Juventus were knocked out of the Coppa Italia by Inter 2–1 at the San Siro, leading the board of directors to ultimately sack Ferrara after weeks of speculation regarding his position, replacing him with Alberto Zaccheroni until the end of the season.

On 22 October 2010, Ferrara was announced as new head coach of the Italy under-21 team, with former teammate Angelo Peruzzi his assistant. Under Ferrara, the Azzurrini remain unbeaten in the 2013 UEFA European U21 Championship qualifiers as of June 2012. On 2 July 2012, he left the country's U-21 side to coach newly promoted Serie A side Sampdoria for the 2012–13 season. However, he was sacked on 17 December 2012.

== Personal life ==
With his fellow Neapolitan friend and former defensive teammate Fabio Cannavaro, Ferrara has helped establish a charity foundation, Fondazione Cannavaro Ferrara, specialising in the procurement of cancer research equipment and surgery for special cases of cancer for a hospital in their native Naples. The foundation also aims to help at-risk youth in Naples.

== Playing statistics ==
=== Club ===
Appearances and goals by club, season and competition
Club	Season	League			Cup		Continental		Other		Total	
Club	Season	Division	Apps	Goals	Apps	Goals	Apps	Goals	Apps	Goals	Apps	Goals
Napoli	1984–85	Serie A	2	0	0	0	–		–		2	0
Napoli	1985–86	Serie A	14	0	2	0	–		–		16	0
Napoli	1986–87	Serie A	28	2	8	0	2	0	–		38	2
Napoli	1987–88	Serie A	23	1	7	0	2	0	–		32	1
Napoli	1988–89	Serie A	27	0	8	0	12	1	–		47	1
Napoli	1989–90	Serie A	33	0	6	0	6	0	–		45	0
Napoli	1990–91	Serie A	29	2	8	2	3	0	1	0	41	4
Napoli	1991–92	Serie A	32	1	2	0	–		–		34	1
Napoli	1992–93	Serie A	31	4	5	0	3	0	–		39	4
Napoli	1993–94	Serie A	28	2	0	0	–		–		28	2
Napoli	Total		247	12	46	2	28	1	1	0	322	15
Juventus	1994–95	Serie A	33	1	7	0	9	1	–		49	2
Juventus	1995–96	Serie A	31	3	1	0	9	0	1	0	42	3
Juventus	1996–97	Serie A	32	4	3	0	11	0	2	1	48	5
Juventus	1997–98	Serie A	17	1	2	0	5	0	1	0	25	1
Juventus	1998–99	Serie A	18	0	2	1	3	0	0	0	23	1
Juventus	1999–00	Serie A	31	1	1	0	9	0	–		41	1
Juventus	2000–01	Serie A	23	1	1	0	6	0	–		30	1
Juventus	2001–02	Serie A	22	3	4	1	4	0	–		30	4
Juventus	2002–03	Serie A	25	0	0	0	12	1	0	0	37	1
Juventus	2003–04	Serie A	17	1	4	0	4	0	1	0	26	1
Juventus	2004–05	Serie A	4	0	1	0	0	0	–		5	0
Juventus	Total		253	15	26	2	72	2	6	1	358	20
Career total			500	27	72	4	100	3	7	1	680	35

=== International ===
Appearances and goals by national team and year
National team	Year	Apps	Goals
Italy	1987	3	0
Italy	1988	4	0
Italy	1989	7	0
Italy	1990	5	0
Italy	1991	6	0
Italy	1992	0	0
Italy	1993	0	0
Italy	1994	0	0
Italy	1995	6	0
Italy	1996	4	0
Italy	1997	8	0
Italy	1998	1	0
Italy	1999	1	0
Italy	2000	4	0
Total		49	0

== Coaching statistics ==
As of 23 March 2017

Team	From	To	Record				
Team	From	To	G	W	D	L	Win %
Juventus	2009	2010	30	15	5	10	50.00
Italy U21	2010	2012	19	12	6	1	63.16
Sampdoria	2012	2012	15	5	3	7	33.33
Wuhan Zall	2016	2017	16	8	1	7	50.00
Total			80	40	15	25	50.00

== Honours ==
=== Player ===
Napoli

- Serie A: 1986–87, 1989–90
- Coppa Italia: 1986–87
- Supercoppa Italiana: 1990
- UEFA Cup: 1988–89

Juventus

- Serie A: 1994–95, 1996–97, 1997–98, 2001–02, 2002–03
- Coppa Italia: 1994–95
- Supercoppa Italiana: 1995, 1997, 2002, 2003
- UEFA Champions League: 1995–96
- UEFA Intertoto Cup: 1999
- UEFA Super Cup: 1996
- Intercontinental Cup: 1996
- UEFA Champions League runner-up: 1996–97, 1997–98, 2002–03
- UEFA Cup runner-up: 1994–95

Italy Olympic team

- Summer Olympic Games semi-finals: 1988

Italy

- UEFA European Championship runner-up: 2000
- FIFA World Cup bronze medal: 1990
- UEFA European Championship bronze medal: 1988
- Scania 100 Tournament: 1991

Individual

- ESM Team of the Year: 1996–97
- FIFA XI (Reserve): 2000
- Premio Nazionale Carriera Esemplare "Gaetano Scirea": 2003
- Pallone d'Argento: 2003
- Juventus FC Hall of Fame: 2025

Orders

- 5th Class / Knight: Cavaliere Ordine al Merito della Repubblica Italiana: 1991

- 4th Class / Officer: Ufficiale Ordine al Merito della Repubblica Italiana: 2000

=== Assistant coach ===
Italy

- FIFA World Cup: 2006
