= Paolo Montero =

Uruguayan footballer and manager (born 1971)

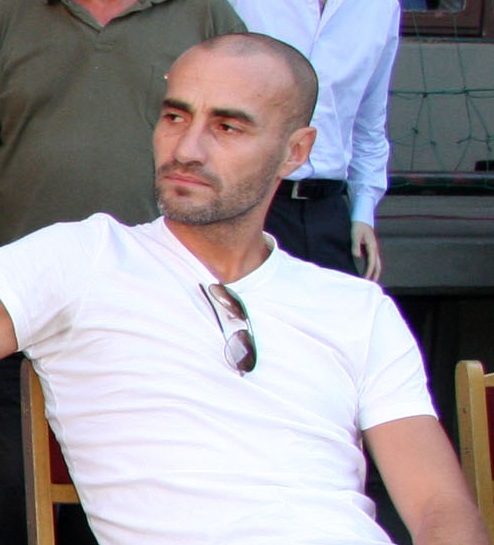
- Montero in 2010

Personal information
- Full name: Rónald Paolo Montero Iglesias
- Date of birth: 3 September 1971 (age 55)
- Place of birth: Montevideo, Uruguay
- Height: 1.78 m (5 ft 10 in)
- Positions: Centre-back; left-back

Youth career
- 1990: Peñarol

Senior career*
Years	Team	Apps	(Gls)
1990–1992	Peñarol	34	(1)
1992–1996	Atalanta	114	(4)
1996–2005	Juventus	186	(1)
2005–2006	San Lorenzo	14	(1)
2006–2007	Peñarol	46	(1)
Total		394	(8)

International career
1991–2005	Uruguay	61	(5)

Managerial career
- 2014: Peñarol (caretaker)
- 2016: Boca Unidos
- 2016: Colón
- 2017: Rosario Central
- 2019–2020: Sambenedettese
- 2021: Sambenedettese
- 2021: San Lorenzo
- 2022–2024: Juventus U19
- 2024: Juventus (caretaker)
- 2024: Juventus Next Gen
- * Club domestic league appearances and goals

Rónald Paolo Montero Iglesias (born 3 September 1971) is a Uruguayan football manager and former player, who played as a central defender or left-back.

Montero began his career in Uruguay with Peñarol in 1990 before moving to Italian side Atalanta in 1992. He joined Juventus in 1996, where he remained until 2005, winning four Serie A titles, among other trophies; he subsequently moved to Argentine club San Lorenzo. In 2006, he transferred back to Peñarol, where he retired in 2007. At international level, he represented the Uruguay national football team at the 1997 FIFA Confederations Cup, at the 2002 FIFA World Cup, and the 2004 Copa América.

== Club career ==
=== Peñarol ===
Montero was born in Montevideo, Uruguay, into a footballing family; his father is former Uruguay international Julio Montero Castillo. As a child, Paolo had to maintain good grades at school, otherwise his father would not allow him to attend football practice. As a professional, Montero started his career for Peñarol in 1990 and remained with the club for two seasons, making 34 appearances and scoring one goal before transferring to Atalanta in the Italian Serie A in 1992.

=== Atalanta ===
After transferring to the Bergamo-based club, Montero became an instant fixture in the club's starting eleven and was a key member of their defence. He managed 27 league appearances and two goals in his debut Serie A season. In his second season with the club, he managed 30 starts, however the club's season ended in relegation to Serie B. In the second division, Montero appeared in 34 games, scoring two goals, helping his team to immediate promotion back to Serie A. During the 1995–1996 Serie A season, Montero struggled with injuries, only making 23 appearances. After impressing greatly during his four-year stay in Bergamo, Montero made the highly anticipated switch to the Italian and European powerhouse, Juventus.

=== Juventus ===
Following the big switch to Turin in 1996, Montero made over 30 appearances in his first season with Juventus in all competitions. It was here, even after an impressive first season, that he achieved great success, winning four scudetti with the club, along with other honours; Montero also won three Italian Supercups, and reached three Champions League finals and two Coppa Italia finals with the club during this period. Montero was believed to have been the best friend of Zinedine Zidane during the pair's time together at Juventus, which ended when Zidane was sold to Real Madrid in 2001. Juventus were extremely dominant both domestically and internationally during this period and had what was considered to be the best defence in the world at the time, and teams strongly regretted ever going down a goal to the club, as they knew how hard it would be to score one back for themselves. Montero played at both center back and left back during this period, forming impressive defensive partnerships with the likes of Ciro Ferrara, Mark Iuliano, Gianluca Pessotto, Lilian Thuram, Alessandro Birindelli, Igor Tudor, Gianluca Zambrotta, Nicola Legrottaglie and Fabio Cannavaro during his ten-year tenure with the club. After the 2004–05 Serie A triumph, Montero and teammate Ferrara called it quits on their Juventus careers. The Uruguayan opted to return to South America, while Ferrara retired. Montero made over 200 appearances for i bianconeri, scoring one league goal. In the 2003 UEFA Champions League final, Montero was one of the three Juventus players to have their penalty saved by AC Milan keeper Dida in the shootout defeat. With his three Champions League final defeats, Montero is the player with the most Champions League final appearances not to win a Champions League medal, alongside former Juventus teammates Alessio Tacchinardi and Gianluigi Buffon.

=== San Lorenzo ===
After his tenure at Juventus, Montero moved to Argentinian club San Lorenzo. However, his time at the club was short-lived, as he constantly missed games due to injuries. He left the club after just 14 appearances and scored one goal against Racing Club. In 2006, offers came in from clubs such as Olympiacos and newly promoted Serie A club Catania; however, Montero chose to return to his childhood club where he began his career, Peñarol.

=== Return to Peñarol ===
For the 2006–07 season, Montero re-joined former club Peñarol for one last season before officially announcing his retirement. He scored one goal in 26 matches during his last season as a professional footballer.

== International career ==
An important member of the Uruguayan national side, Montero first represented his team in an international tournament at the 1997 FIFA Confederations Cup, finishing in fourth place. He had previously played for the Uruguay U-20 side in the 1991 Under-20 World Championship. He also appeared for the senior side in the 2002 World Cup, after helping his side to qualify for the tournament, where the talented Uruguayan squad were disappointingly eliminated in the group stage. In the 2004 Copa América, Montero and Uruguay reached the semi-finals, finishing the tournament in third place. Montero also captained his country in their bid to qualify for the 2006 FIFA World Cup in an intercontinental playoff against Australia, the country the Uruguayans defeated by a very convincing margin of 3–0 to qualify for the 2002 FIFA World Cup tournament four years before. Sadly for Montero, he limped off with a hamstring injury during the second game in Sydney, and later, Australia went on to narrowly snatch the win and the World Cup qualification via penalties. After the defeat, Montero immediately announced his international retirement, saying "what happened today was such a pity as this group of players deserved to be at the World Cup finals." Montero made over 60 appearances for his country in between 1991 and 2006, scoring 5 goals.

== Retirement ==
Paolo Montero reportedly retired in late May 2007 after attending a team training session in order to say goodbye to his teammates. His current squad had tried to persuade him to come back to football, with teammate Rubén Capria saying that "it's a tough blow to lose our captain".

He played his final match in what was also Marcelo Salas' farewell match, a former Juventus teammate of Montero's.

In August 2019, Montero enrolled in the UEFA Pro Licence courses at Coverciano.

== Style of play ==
Considered to be one of the best defenders of his time, and one of Juventus's greatest ever centre-backs, Montero has been described as "skilful on the ball and calm under pressure", and a "wonderfully talented and intelligent footballer". In his prime, he was regarded as one of the best defenders in the world. His international reputation is one of a man who was "fearsome, immovable and essential, in a back line that conquered Italy and Europe". A versatile defender, he was capable of playing in the centre (both as a stopper or as a sweeper) or on the left (although this was not his favoured position), and was known for his strength, consistency, leadership and organisational skills. Montero also stood out during his career due to his aerial ability, timing, technical ability, and distribution.

A combative, tenacious, complete and talented defender, he was also frequently criticised for his aggression and hard tackling playing style throughout his career, as well as his knack for picking up unnecessary bookings. He holds the record for the most red cards received by a player in Serie A history, being sent off 16 times, and was sent off a total of 21 times throughout his career. In 2007, The Times placed him at number 39 in their list of the 50 hardest footballers in history. Welsh former winger Ryan Giggs described Montero and his defensive teammate at Juventus Ciro Ferrara as "...the toughest defenders [he] played against", also adding that they were often very hard in their challenges.

== Managerial career ==
After retirement, Montero embarked on a career as a manager, working in his native Uruguay with Peñarol, and in Argentina with Boca Unidos, Colón, and Rosario Central. On 6 June 2019, he returned to Italy, being unveiled as the new head coach of Serie C club Sambenedettese for the club's 2019–20 season. He was sacked on 27 October 2020 after a string of defeats in the 2020–21 Serie C season. He was reinstated as Sambenedettese head coach on 11 February 2021, following the resignations of Mauro Zironelli. On 28 June 2022, Montero was appointed as head coach of Juventus U19. On 19 May 2024, days after the dismissal of first team head coach Massimiliano Allegri, Juventus announced that Montero would serve as caretaker head coach for the remaining two games of the 2023–24 Serie A season. He was successively promoted in charge of the Under-23 team, Juventus Next Gen, playing in the Serie C league. However, Montero was dismissed from his role on 12 November 2024, leaving Juventus Next Gen dead last in the league table.

== Personal life ==
His son, Alfonso, represented Uruguay's U17 squad from 2022 to 2023, and subsequently signed for his father's old club, Juventus.

== Career statistics ==
=== Club ===
Including only appearances and goals for Atalanta and Juventus
Club	Season	League			Cup		Continental		Total	
Club	Season	Division	Apps	Goals	Apps	Goals	Apps	Goals	Apps	Goals
Italy		League			Coppa Italia		Europe		Total	
Atalanta	1992–93	Serie A	27	2	2	0	—		29	2
Atalanta	1993–94	Serie A	30	0	3	0	—		33	0
Atalanta	1994–95	Serie A	34	2	3	0	—		37	2
Atalanta	1995–96	Serie A	23	0	6	0	—		29	0
Total			114	4	14	0	—		128	4
Juventus	1996–97	Serie A	26	0	3	1	11	1	42^{1}	2
Juventus	1997–98	Serie A	26	0	5	0	7	0	39^{2}	0
Juventus	1998–99	Serie A	22	0	2	0	9	0	35^{3}	0
Juventus	1999–00	Serie A	28	0	2	0	10	0	40	0
Juventus	2000–01	Serie A	23	0	0	0	0	0	23	0
Juventus	2001–02	Serie A	16	0	4	0	7	1	27	1
Juventus	2002–03	Serie A	21	0	0	0	12	2	34^{4}	2
Juventus	2003–04	Serie A	19	1	1	0	6	0	26	1
Juventus	2004–05	Serie A	5	0	1	0	6	0	12	0
Total			186	1	18	1	68	4	278	6
Total for Atalanta and Juventus			300	5	32	1	68	4	406	10

- ^{1} Including 1 match in 1996 Intercontinental Cup and 1 match in 1996 UEFA Super Cup.
- ^{2} Including 1 match in 1997 Supercoppa Italiana.
- ^{3} Including 2 matches in season 1998–99 UEFA Cup qualification.
- ^{4} Including 1 match in 2002 Supercoppa Italiana.

=== International ===
Appearances and goals by national team and year
National team	Year	Apps	Goals
Uruguay	1991	4	0
Uruguay	1992	0	0
Uruguay	1993	1	0
Uruguay	1994	0	0
Uruguay	1995	4	0
Uruguay	1996	5	1
Uruguay	1997	10	1
Uruguay	1998	1	0
Uruguay	1999	4	0
Uruguay	2000	5	1
Uruguay	2001	9	0
Uruguay	2002	4	0
Uruguay	2003	0	0
Uruguay	2004	6	2
Uruguay	2005	7	0
Total		60	5

Scores and results list Uruguay's goal tally first.

List of international goals scored by Paolo Montero
No.	Date	Venue	Opponent	Score	Result	Competition
1.	15 December 1996	Estadio Centenario, Montevideo, Uruguay	Peru	1–0	2–0	1998 FIFA World Cup qualification
2.	2 April 1997	Estadio Centenario, Montevideo, Uruguay	Venezuela	2–0	3–1	1998 FIFA World Cup qualification
3.	3 June 2000	Estadio Centenario, Montevideo, Uruguay	Chile	2–1	2–1	2002 FIFA World Cup qualification
4.	7 July 2004	Estadio Elías Aguirre, Chiclayo, Peru	Mexico	2–2	2–2	2004 Copa América
5.	17 November 2004	Estadio Centenario, Montevideo, Uruguay	Paraguay	1–0	1–0	2006 FIFA World Cup qualification

=== Managerial ===
As of match played 25 May 2024

Team	Nat	From	To	Record				
Team	Nat	From	To	G	W	D	L	Win %
Peñarol (Caretaker)	(Uruguay)	11 November 2014	23 December 2014	3	2	0	1	66.67
Boca Unidos	(Argentina)	10 March 2016	30 June 2016	15	9	4	2	60.00
Colón	(Argentina)	1 July 2016	22 December 2016	15	7	2	6	46.67
Rosario Central	(Argentina)	3 January 2017	10 November 2017	29	12	10	7	41.38
Sambenedettese	(Italy)	6 June 2019	27 October 2020	37	12	9	16	32.43
Sambenedettese	(Italy)	11 February 2021	9 May 2021	16	4	6	6	25.00
San Lorenzo	(Argentina)	17 June 2021	21 October 2021	17	4	5	8	23.53
Juventus U19	(Italy)	28 June 2022	present	77	30	18	29	38.96
Juventus (Caretaker)	(Italy)	18 May 2024	30 June 2024	2	1	1	0	50.00
Total				211	81	55	75	38.39

== Honours ==
=== Club ===
Juventus

- Serie A (4): 1996–97, 1997–98, 2001–02, 2002–03
- Supercoppa Italiana (3): 1997, 2002, 2003
- UEFA Super Cup (1): 1996
- Intercontinental Cup (1): 1996
- UEFA Intertoto Cup (1): 1999
- UEFA Champions League: runner-up: 1996–97, 1997–98, 2002–03

=== Individual ===
- FIFA Confederations Cup Team of the Year: 1997
- IFFHS Uruguayan Men's Dream Team (Team B)
