= Alessandro Birindelli =

Italian retired footballer (born 1974)

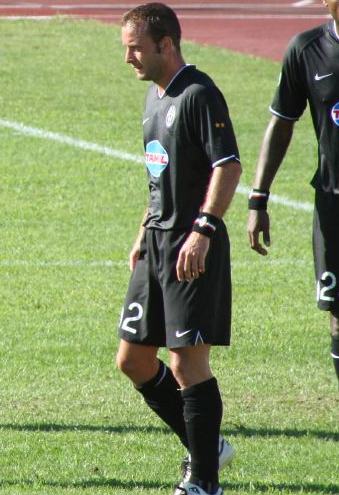
- Birindelli training with Juventus in 2006

Personal information
- Date of birth: 12 November 1974 (age 51)
- Place of birth: Pisa, Italy
- Height: 1.76 m (5 ft 9 in)
- Position: Full-back

Youth career
- San Frediano
- –1992: Empoli

Senior career*
Years	Team	Apps	(Gls)
1992–1997	Empoli	117	(1)
1997–2008	Juventus	196	(2)
2008–2009	Pisa	37	(0)
2009–2010	Pescina Valle del Giovenco	27	(0)
Total		377	(3)

International career
1997	Italy U23	3	(0)
2002–2004	Italy	6	(0)

Managerial career
- 2011: Pistoiese
- 2025–2026: Pianese
- 2026: Novara
Medal record
Men's football
Representing Italy
Mediterranean Games
Winner	1997 Italy
- * Club domestic league appearances and goals

Alessandro Birindelli (Italian pronunciation: [alesˈsandro birinˈdɛlli]; born 12 November 1974) is an Italian professional football coach and a former player who played as a full-back or as a wide midfielder.

Equally at ease on both the left and the right flanks, he was best known for his 11-year spell with Juventus, during which time he won several accolades and appeared in 305 official games in all competitions.

== Club career ==
=== Early years ===
Born to Paolo and Erminia Birindelli in Pisa as the second of two children, Birindelli started playing football at the age of eight for the local team of San Frediano (an area of Pisa not far from his boyhood home and the church of the same name).

A longtime Juventus fan, being an admirer of Michel Platini, he was also influenced by Paolo Maldini's professionalism and sportsmanship, and entered Empoli FC's youth academy, beginning his career as a right winger before moving into defence. In 1996, he won the Coppa Italia Serie C, as the team finished second in its group in Serie C1, thus earning Serie B promotion; Empoli followed this with another climb, now to Serie A, after collecting 64 points which trailed only Brescia Calcio's 66.

=== Juventus ===
After nearly 150 official matches, Birindelli ended his career with Empoli and moved to Juventus in 1997, managed at the time by Marcello Lippi, joining an already strong squad – which featured young prodigies Alessandro Del Piero and Zinedine Zidane – and arriving alongside Edgar Davids and Filippo Inzaghi. He made his league debut in a 2–0 victory over US Lecce on 31 August, but his first competitive appearance had taken place in the Supercoppa Italiana defeat of Vicenza Calcio.

In his first season Birindelli won the Scudetto over Inter Milan, by five points. He was an unused substitute as the club lost the UEFA Champions League for the second consecutive time, now to Real Madrid.

Birindelli won two more leagues with Juventus, in 2002 and 2003, adding two Italian Supercups and also reaching two Coppa Italia finals. Again, he was a part of the side which lost in a Champions League final, this time in the 2002–03 edition against AC Milan on penalties which was the first all-Italian final in the history of the competition, being one of only team players to convert his attempt in an eventual 3–2 defeat.

In the summer of 2005, while playing a friendly against S.L. Benfica, Birindelli injured his ankle and missed the entire campaign. Due to the Turin club's involvement in the 2006 Italian football scandal, it was stripped of its 2005 and 2006 titles, and also relegated to the second division.

Birindelli and Juventus initially started 2006–07 with a 30-point deduction as a further punishment for their role in the match-fixing scandal, but it was ultimately reduced to nine, which allowed for another Cadetti conquest for the player and the subsequent promotion. He contributed with 37 league appearances to this feat, while also becoming vice-captain.

Claudio Ranieri took over as coach for the 2007–08 season, and Birindelli only played seven times in the league. On 17 May 2008, he left the club after 11 years, claiming that he wished to continue playing for another year or two.

=== Later career ===
On 22 July 2008, Birindelli was announced as Pisa Calcio's new signing, thus finally giving him the opportunity to play for his hometown side. However, the team suffered relegation from the second tier at the end of the campaign, and then excluded from Italian football due to financial issues.

In August 2009, Birindelli signed a two-year contract with lowly AS Pescina Valle del Giovenco. He found himself a free agent in June 2010, after the club was excluded from football due to heavy debts.

== International career ==
Birindelli represented Italy's under-17s at the 1991 FIFA World Championship, but did not start in any of the team's three games. His first start in a national jersey was as part of the Marco Tardelli-led under-23 squad that competed in the 1997 Mediterranean Games, held in Bari: the nation went on to win the gold medal, with him featuring in three of the four matches including the final against Turkey.

Birindelli's full debut came with Giovanni Trapattoni on 20 November 2002, a 1–1 friendly draw with Turkey. He went on to gain a further five caps in nearly two years, the last being the 2–0 loss in Iceland, and was not summoned for UEFA Euro 2004.

In July 2010 Birindelli retired from active football, immediately being named assistant coach in the Zambia national team led by countryman Dario Bonetti. He resigned from his position in February 2011, due to misunderstandings.

== Style of play ==
Birindelli was a hard-working, tenacious, and versatile player, who was capable of playing as a full-back or wide midfielder on either flank, although he often played on the right side of the pitch. He was mainly known for his speed, stamina, and consistency, as well as his sportsmanship, which enabled him to cover the flank effectively.

== Coaching career ==
Birindelli served as assistant coach to the Zambia between 2010 and 2011. On 19 September 2011, Birindelli was appointed head coach at US Pistoiese 1921 in Serie D, leaving his post the following month.

He successively worked as an assistant coach at Dinamo București (2012), then joined as head of youth development at Pisa (2013-2014) and Trapani (2014-2016).

From 2016 to 2017, Birindelli worked as a coaching member of Empoli FC Youth Sector, in charge of the Under-17 team. He successively moved to Pisa SC, spending four years with the youth teams of the Nerazzurri, before returning to Empoli in 2021 as a youth coach.

On 17 June 2025, Birindelli took over at Serie C club Pianese.

On 5 June 2026, Birindelli was hired by Novara in Serie C for two seasons. On 28 September 2026, he was dismissed by Novara after starting the season with one win in 7 matches.

== Personal life ==
Birindelli married his childhood sweetheart, Silvia, with whom he had two children, Samuele and Matteo. Samuele Birindelli made his professional debut as a defender for Pisa in December 2016.

== Career statistics ==
=== Club ===
Appearances and goals by club, season and competition
Club	Season	League			National Cup		Continental		Other		Total	
Club	Season	Division	Apps	Goals	Apps	Goals	Apps	Goals	Apps	Goals	Apps	Goals
Empoli	1992–93	Serie C1	1	0	—		—		—		1	0
Empoli	1993–94	Serie C1	22	0	1	0	—		—		23	0
Empoli	1994–95	Serie C1	29	0	0	0	—		—		29	0
Empoli	1995–96	Serie C1	30	0	0	0	—		—		30	0
Empoli	1996–97	Serie B	35	1	3	0	—		—		38	1
Empoli	Total		117	1	4	0	—		—		121	1
Juventus	1997–98	Serie A	29	0	7	1	10 (Note: Appearances in UEFA Champions League)	1	1 (Note: Appearance in Supercoppa Italiana)	0	47	2
Juventus	1998–99	Serie A	24	1	2	0	8	1	2 (Note: One appearance in Supercoppa Italiana, one appearance in Serie A European play-offs)	0	36	2
Juventus	1999–00	Serie A	22	0	4	0	12 (Note: Four appearances in UEFA Intertoto Cup, eight appearances in UEFA Cup)	0	—		38	0
Juventus	2000–01	Serie A	19	0	1	0	5	0	—		25	0
Juventus	2001–02	Serie A	10	0	8	1	9	0	—		27	1
Juventus	2002–03	Serie A	17	0	4	0	13	1	1	0	35	1
Juventus	2003–04	Serie A	19	0	3	0	5	0	1	0	28	0
Juventus	2004–05	Serie A	12	0	2	0	4	0	—		18	0
Juventus	2005–06	Serie A	0	0	0	0	0	0	0	0	0	0
Juventus	2006–07	Serie B	37	1	3	0	—		—		40	1
Juventus	2007–08	Serie A	7	0	4	0	—		—		11	0
Juventus	Total		196	2	38	2	66	3	5	0	305	7
Pisa	2008–09	Serie B	37	0	1	0	—		—		38	0
Pescina Valle del Giovenco	2009–10	Lega Pro Prima Divisione	27	0	0	0	—		2 (Note: Appearances in Lega Pro Prima Divisione-Relegation play-outs)	0	29	0
Career total			377	3	43	2	66	3	7	0	493	8

=== International ===
Appearances and goals by national team and year
National team	Year	Apps	Goals
Italy	2002	1	0
Italy	2003	3	0
Italy	2004	2	0
Total		6	0

== Honours ==
Empoli

- Coppa Italia Serie C: 1995–96

Juventus

- Serie A: 1997–98, 2001–02, 2002–03
- Serie B: 2006–07
- Coppa Italia runner-up: 2001–02, 2003–04
- Supercoppa Italiana: 1997, 2002, 2003
- UEFA Champions League runner-up: 1997–98, 2002–03
- UEFA Intertoto Cup: 1999

Italy U23

- Mediterranean Games: 1997
