= 1995–96 Juventus FC season =

Italian football club season

Juventus
1995–96 season
- Manager: Marcello Lippi
- Stadium: Stadio delle Alpi
- Serie A: 2nd
- Coppa Italia: Round of 16
- Supercoppa Italiana: Winners
- UEFA Champions League: Winners
- Top goalscorer: League: Fabrizio Ravanelli (12); All: Fabrizio Ravanelli (18)
Home colours	Away colours	Third colours

Juventus Football Club finished second in Serie A following the 1995-96 season and regained the European Cup trophy after 11 years, winning the Champions League final against Ajax 4–2 on penalties in Rome. Juventus also won the Supercoppa Italiana in the late summer of 1995, before going on to finish second in the league. Following the Champions League title, strikers Gianluca Vialli and Fabrizio Ravanelli were sold to Chelsea and Middlesbrough, respectively. The club also dropped Pietro Vierchowod, Paulo Sousa and Massimo Carrera. Instead, Juventus decided to sign playmaker Zinedine Zidane from Bordeaux, along with young striker Christian Vieri, who signed from Atalanta.

== Overview ==
Competition	Result	Top scorer
Serie A	Runners-up	(Italy) Fabrizio Ravanelli, 12
Coppa Italia	Round of 16	(Italy) Alessandro Del Piero, 1 (Federal Republic of Yugoslavia) Vladimir Jugović, 1 (Italy) Michele Padovano, 1 (Italy) Fabrizio Ravanelli, 1
Supercoppa Italiana	Winners	(Italy) Gianluca Vialli, 1
UEFA Champions League	Winners	(Italy) Alessandro Del Piero, 6
Overall		(Italy) Fabrizio Ravanelli, 18

== Players ==
=== Squad information ===
Squad at end of season

Note: Flags indicate national team as defined under FIFA eligibility rules; some limited exceptions apply. Players may hold more than one non-FIFA nationality.

No.	Pos.	Nation	Player
1	GK	ITA	Angelo Peruzzi
2	DF	ITA	Ciro Ferrara
3	DF	ITA	Moreno Torricelli
4	DF	ITA	Massimo Carrera
5	DF	ITA	Sergio Porrini
6	MF	POR	Paulo Sousa
7	MF	ITA	Angelo Di Livio
8	MF	ITA	Antonio Conte
9	FW	ITA	Gianluca Vialli (captain)
10	FW	ITA	Alessandro Del Piero
11	FW	ITA	Fabrizio Ravanelli
12	GK	ITA	Michelangelo Rampulla

No.	Pos.	Nation	Player
13	MF	ITA	Giancarlo Marocchi
14	MF	FRA	Didier Deschamps
15	MF	ITA	Alessio Tacchinardi
17	FW	ITA	Tommaso Rocchi
18	MF	YUG	Vladimir Jugović
19	MF	ITA	Attilio Lombardo
20	DF	ITA	Pietro Vierchowod
21	FW	ITA	Michele Padovano
22	DF	ITA	Gianluca Pessotto
23	MF	ARG	Juan Pablo Sorín
24	DF	ITA	Simone Loria

=== Transfers ===
In
Pos.	Name	from	Type
MF	Vladimir Jugović	Sampdoria	€6 million
DF	Pietro Vierchowod	Sampdoria	€250,000
MF	Attilio Lombardo	Sampdoria	€7.5 million
DF	Gianluca Pessotto	Torino	€5.1 million
FW	Michele Padovano	A.C. Reggiana	
DF	Juan Pablo Sorín	Argentinos Juniors	€500,000

Out
Pos.	Name	To	Type
FW	Roberto Baggio	A.C. Milan	€9.3 million
DF	Jürgen Kohler	Borussia Dortmund	€2.6 million
DF	Robert Jarni	Real Betis	€1.44 million
GK	Lorenzo Squizzi	SPAL	
DF	Alessandro Orlando	Fiorentina	
FW	Enrico Fantini	U.S. Cremonese	loan
FW	Corrado Grabbi	Lucchese	loan

=== Left club during season ===
Note: Flags indicate national team as defined under FIFA eligibility rules; some limited exceptions apply. Players may hold more than one non-FIFA nationality.

No.	Pos.	Nation	Player
16	MF	ITA	Luca Fusi (to Lugano)

== Competitions ==
Times from 1 July to 24 September 1995 and from 31 March to 30 June 1996 are UTC+2, from 24 September 1995 to 31 March 1996 UTC+1.

=== Supercoppa Italiana ===
17 January 1996	Juventus	1–0	Parma	Turin
20:30	Vialli 33'; Peruzzi (red card) 40'			Stadium: Stadio delle Alpi; Referee: Piero Ceccarini

=== Serie A ===
==== League table ====
Pos	Team	Pld	W	D	L	GF	GA	GD	Pts	Qualification or relegation
1	Milan (C)	34	21	10	3	60	24	+36	73	Qualified to Champions League
2	Juventus	34	19	8	7	58	35	+23	65 (Note: Juventus qualified to 1996–97 UEFA Champions League as title holders.)	Qualified to Champions League
3	Lazio	34	17	8	9	66	38	+28	59	Qualification to UEFA Cup
4	Fiorentina	34	17	8	9	53	41	+12	59	Qualification to Cup Winners' Cup
5	Roma	34	16	10	8	51	34	+17	58 (Note: ROM 1-1 PAR; PAR 1-1 ROM Roma is ahead due to Goal difference.)	Qualification to UEFA Cup

Source: 1995–96 Serie A, RSSSF.com, Soccerway
Rules for classification: 1) Points; 2) Head-to-head points; 3) Head-to-head goal difference; 4) Goal difference; 5) Goals scored; 6) Draw. (Note: Head-to-head record is used only after all the matches between the teams in question have been played).
(C) Champions

==== Results by round ====
Round	1	2	3	4	5	6	7	8	9	10	11	12	13	14	15	16	17	18	19	20	21	22	23	24	25	26	27	28	29	30	31	32	33	34
Ground	H	A	H	A	H	A	H	A	A	H	A	H	A	H	H	A	H	A	H	A	H	A	H	A	H	A	H	A	H	H	A	A	H	A
Result	W	W	W	D	D	L	W	L	L	W	D	W	L	W	L	W	D	D	W	L	W	W	D	W	W	W	W	W	W	L	W	D	W	D
Position	1	1	1	2	2	5	2	6	7	5	6	5	5	4	5	4	4	4	4	4	4	4	4	4	3	2	2	2	2	2	2	2	2	2

Source: Competitive matches
A = Away; H = Home; W = Win; D = Draw; L = Loss; = 1996–97 UEFA Champions League; = 1996–97 UEFA Cup

==== Matches ====
27 August 1995 1	Juventus	4–1	Cremonese	Turin
16:00 CEST (UTC+02:00)	Jugović 17'; Ravanelli 65', 71' (pen.); Tentoni 87' (o.g.)	Report	Maspero 50'	Stadium: Stadio delle Alpi; Referee: Roberto Bettin

10 September 1995 2	Piacenza	0–4	Juventus	Piacenza
16:00 CEST (UTC+02:00)		Report	Vialli 45', 86'; Torricelli 60'; Ravanelli 74'	Stadium: Stadio Leonardo Garilli; Referee: Graziano Cesari

17 September 1995 3	Juventus	1–0	Vicenza	Turin
16:00 CEST (UTC+02:00)	Vialli 21'	Report		Stadium: Stadio delle Alpi; Referee: Emilio Pellegrino

24 September 1995 4	Cagliari	0–0	Juventus	Cagliari
20:30 CET (UTC+01:00)		Report		Stadium: Stadio Sant'Elia; Referee: Livio Bazzoli

1 October 1995 5	Juventus	1–1	Napoli	Turin
15:00 CET (UTC+01:00)	Vialli 55'	Report	Pecchia 52'	Stadium: Stadio delle Alpi; Referee: Stefano Braschi

15 October 1995 6	Milan	2–1	Juventus	Milan
15:00 CET (UTC+01:00)	Simone 7'; Weah 14'	Report	53' Ferrara Del Piero 81'	Stadium: San Siro; Referee: Robert Anthony Boggi

22 October 1995 7	Juventus	3–1	Padova	Turin
14:30 CET (UTC+01:00)	Del Piero 39'; Ravanelli 54'; Conte 90'	Report	Amoruso 76'	Stadium: Stadio delle Alpi; Referee: Daniele Tombolini

29 October 1995 8	Lazio	4–0	Juventus	Rome
14:30 CET (UTC+01:00)	Signori 40'; Casiraghi 45', 77'; Rambaudi 71'	Report		Stadium: Stadio Olimpico; Referee: Pierluigi Collina

5 November 1995 9	Udinese	1–0	Juventus	Udine
14:30 CET (UTC+01:00)	Bierhoff 73'	Report		Stadium: Stadio Friuli; Referee: Piero Ceccarini

19 November 1995 10	Juventus	1–0	Fiorentina	Turin
14:30 CET (UTC+01:00)	Del Piero 11'	Report		Stadium: Stadio delle Alpi; Referee: Livio Bazzoli

26 November 1995 11	Parma	1–1	Juventus	Parma
20:30 CET (UTC+01:00)	Asprilla 45'	Report	9' Ferrara; 31' Vierchowod	Stadium: Stadio Ennio Tardini; Referee: Stefano Braschi

3 December 1995 12	Juventus	5–0	Torino	Turin
20:30 CET (UTC+01:00)	Vialli 3', 27', 43'; Ferrara 47'; Ravanelli 67' (pen.)	Report		Stadium: Stadio delle Alpi; Referee: Marcello Nicchi

10 December 1995 13	Sampdoria	2–0	Juventus	Genoa
14:30 CET (UTC+01:00)	Chiesa 41', 53'	Report		Stadium: Stadio Luigi Ferraris; Referee: Robert Anthony Boggi

17 December 1995 14	Juventus	1–0	Internazionale	Turin
20:30 CET (UTC+01:00)	Vialli 29'	Report		Stadium: Stadio delle Alpi; Referee: Piero Ceccarini

23 December 1995 15	Juventus	0–2	Roma	Turin
14:30 CET (UTC+01:00)		Report	Balbo 45'; Ferrara 66' (o.g.)	Stadium: Stadio delle Alpi; Referee: Pierluigi Collina

7 January 1996 16	Atalanta	0–1	Juventus	Bergamo
14:30 CET (UTC+01:00)		Report	Ravanelli 59' (pen.)	Stadium: Stadio Atleti Azzurri d'Italia; Referee: Cosimo Bolognino

14 January 1996 17	Juventus	1–1	Bari	Turin
14:30 CET (UTC+01:00)	Ravanelli 40' (pen.)	Report	Protti 9'	Stadium: Stadio delle Alpi; Referee: Salvatore Racalbuto

21 January 1996 18	Cremonese	3–3	Juventus	Cremona
14:30 CET (UTC+01:00)	Peruzzi 23' (o.g.); Maspero 57' (pen.); Tentoni 77'	Report	Vialli 11'; Ravanelli 67' (pen.); Vierchowod 90'	Stadium: Stadio Giovanni Zini; Referee: Loris Stafoggia

28 January 1996 19	Juventus	2–0	Piacenza	Turin
14:30 CET (UTC+01:00)	Conte 34'; Ferrara 61'	Report		Stadium: Stadio delle Alpi; Referee: Stefano Farina

4 February 1996 20	Vicenza	2–1	Juventus	Vicenza
14:30 CET (UTC+01:00)	Otero 18' (pen.); Murgita 48'	Report	Ravanelli 66'	Stadium: Stadio Romeo Menti; Referee: Domenico Messina

11 February 1996 21	Juventus	4–1	Cagliari	Turin
15:00 CET (UTC+01:00)	Bonomi 10' (o.g.); Ravanelli 22'; Del Piero 79'; Jugović 90'	Report	Oliveira 89'	Stadium: Stadio delle Alpi; Referee: Emilio Pellegrino

18 February 1996 22	Napoli	0–1	Juventus	Naples
15:00 CET (UTC+01:00)		Report	Ravanelli 81'	Stadium: Stadio San Paolo; Referee: Fiorenzo Treossi

25 February 1996 23	Juventus	1–1	Milan	Turin
20:30 CET (UTC+01:00)	Conte 3'	Report	Weah 30'	Stadium: Stadio delle Alpi; Referee: Robert Anthony Boggi

2 March 1996 24	Padova	0–5	Juventus	Padua
20:30 CET (UTC+01:00)		Report	27'Ferrara; Del Piero 29', 67'; Lombardo 42'; Padovano 72', 90'	Stadium: Stadio Euganeo; Referee: Stefano Farina

10 March 1996 25	Juventus	4–2	Lazio	Turin
15:00 CET (UTC+01:00)	Deschamps 35' '63 Vierchowod; Chamot 70' (o.g.); Conte 72'; Padovano 83'	Report	Favalli 3'; Casiraghi 18'	Stadium: Stadio delle Alpi; Referee: Domenico Messina

24 March 1996 27	Fiorentina	0–1	Juventus	Florence
15:00 CET (UTC+01:00)		Report	Amoruso 28' (o.g.)	Stadium: Stadio Artemio Franchi; Referee: Graziano Cesari

30 March 1996 28	Juventus	1–0	Parma	Turin
16:00 CET (UTC+01:00)	Bucci 63' (o.g.)	Report		Stadium: Stadio delle Alpi; Referee: Loris Stafoggia

6 April 1996 29	Torino	1–2	Juventus	Turin
16:00 CEST (UTC+02:00)	Rizzitelli 32'	Report	Sogliano 47' (o.g.); Vialli 65'	Stadium: Stadio delle Alpi; Referee: Piero Ceccarini

10 April 1996 26	Juventus	2–1	Udinese	Turin
20:30 CEST (UTC+02:00)	Ravanelli 26'; Vierchowod 83'	Report	Stroppa 15'	Stadium: Stadio delle Alpi; Referee: Cosimo Bolognino

13 April 1996 30	Juventus	0–3	Sampdoria	Turin
16:00 CEST (UTC+02:00)		Report	Chiesa 1'; Balleri 57'; Seedorf 62'	Stadium: Stadio delle Alpi; Referee: Gennaro Borriello

20 April 1996 31	Internazionale	1–2	Juventus	Milan
16:00 CEST (UTC+02:00)	Ganz 79'	Report	Lombardo 4'; Conte 55'; 61' Peruzzi	Stadium: Giuseppe Meazza; Referee: Marcello Nicchi

28 April 1996 32	Roma	2–2	Juventus	Rome
16:00 CEST (UTC+02:00)	Delvecchio 4'; Moriero 54'	Report	Cappioli 62' (o.g.); Padovano 70'	Stadium: Stadio Olimpico; Referee: Pierluigi Collina

5 May 1996 33	Juventus	1–0	Atalanta	Turin
16:00 CEST (UTC+02:00)	Deschamps 67'	Report		Stadium: Stadio delle Alpi; Referee: Daniele Tombolini

12 May 1996 34	Bari	2–2	Juventus	Bari
16:00 CEST (UTC+02:00)	Protti 45', 85'	Report	Montanari 20' (o.g.); Vialli 69'	Stadium: Stadio San Nicola; Referee: Domenico Messina

=== Coppa Italia ===
==== Second round ====
30 August 1995	Avellino	1–4	Juventus	Avellino
20:30	Bortoluzzi 30'		Padovano 25'; Ravanelli 44'; Del Piero 72'; Jugović 76'	Stadium: Stadio Partenio; Referee: Gianni Beschin

==== Third Round ====
25 October 1995	Atalanta	1–0 (a.e.t.)	Juventus	Bergamo
20:30	Gallo 118'			Stadium: Stadio Atleti Azzurri d'Italia; Referee: Roberto Bettin

=== UEFA Champions League ===
==== Group stage ====
Pos	Team	Pld	W	D	L	GF	GA	GD	Pts	Qualification	JUV	DOR	STE	RAN
1	(Italy) Juventus	6	4	1	1	15	4	+11	13	Advance to knockout stage	—	1–2	3–0	4–1
2	(Germany) Borussia Dortmund	6	2	3	1	8	8	0	9	Advance to knockout stage	1–3	—	1–0	2–2
3	(Romania) Steaua București	6	1	3	2	2	5	−3	6		0–0	0–0	—	1–0
4	(Scotland) Rangers	6	0	3	3	6	14	−8	3		0–4	2–2	1–1	—

Source: UEFA

13 September 1995 1	Borussia Dortmund (Germany)	1–3	(Italy) Juventus	Dortmund, Germany
20:30 CEST (UTC+02:00)	Möller 1'	Report	Padovano 12', (yellow card) 22'; Del Piero 37'; Torricelli (yellow card) 56'; Conte 69'	Stadium: Westfalenstadion; Attendance: 35,800; Referee: Kurt Röthlisberger (Switzerland)

27 September 1995 2	Juventus (Italy)	3–0	(Romania) Steaua București	Turin, Italy
20:30 CET (UTC+01:00)	Deschamps (yellow card) 4'; Pessotto (yellow card) 10'; Ravanelli (yellow card) 29', (goal) 49'; Di Livio 35'; Del Piero 40'; Conte (yellow card) 79'	Report	Lăcătuș (yellow card) 8'	Stadium: Stadio delle Alpi; Attendance: 34,500; Referee: Dermot Gallagher (England)

18 October 1995 3	Juventus (Italy)	4–1	(Scotland) Rangers	Turin, Italy
20:30 CET (UTC+01:00)	Ravanelli 15', 76'; Conte 17'; Del Piero 23'	Report	Durie (yellow card) 25'; Cleland (red card) 55'; Gough 79'	Stadium: Stadio delle Alpi; Attendance: 49,625; Referee: Vadim Zhuk (Belarus)

1 November 1995 4	Rangers (Scotland)	0–4	(Italy) Juventus	Glasgow, Scotland
21:30 CET (UTC+01:00)	Petrić (yellow card) 73'; Gough (yellow card) 88'; Brown (yellow card) 89'	Report	Torricelli (yellow card) 5', (goal) 65'; Del Piero 16'; Ravanelli 88'; Marocchi 90'	Stadium: Ibrox Park; Attendance: 42,523; Referee: Ahmet Çakar (Turkey)

22 November 1995 5	Juventus (Italy)	1–2	(Germany) Borussia Dortmund	Turin, Italy
20:30 CET (UTC+01:00)	Carrera (yellow card) 16'; Del Piero 90'	Report	Ricken (yellow card) 4', (goal) 65'; Zorc 29'; Kohler (yellow card) 50'; Reuter (yellow card) 90'	Stadium: Stadio delle Alpi; Attendance: 35,000; Referee: Anders Frisk (Sweden)

6 December 1995 6	Steaua București (Romania)	0–0	(Italy) Juventus	Bucharest, Romania
20:30 CET (UTC+01:00)	Doboș (yellow card) 53'; Vladoiu (red card) 59'	Report	Marocchi (yellow card) 62'	Stadium: Stadionul Ghencea; Attendance: 2,700; Referee: Gerd Grabher (Austria)

==== Knockout phase ====
===== Quarter-finals =====
6 March 1996 First leg	Real Madrid (Spain)	1–0	(Italy) Juventus	Madrid, Spain
20:30 CET (UTC+01:00)	Raúl 20'; Hierro (yellow card) 57'	Report	Carrera (yellow card) 15'; Ravanelli (yellow card) 71'; Torricelli (yellow card) 88'	Stadium: Santiago Bernabéu; Attendance: 80,000; Referee: Kurt Röthlisberger (Switzerland)

20 March 1996 Second leg	Juventus (Italy)	2–0 (2–1 agg.)	(Spain) Real Madrid	Turin, Italy
20:30 CET (UTC+01:00)	Del Piero 17', (yellow card) 29'; Jugović (yellow card) 32'; Padovano 54'; Deschamps (yellow card) 59'; Torricelli (red card) 79'; Conte (yellow card) 81'	Report	Míchel (yellow card) 19'; Luis Enrique (yellow card) 31'; Alkorta (red card) 72'; Milla (yellow card) 82'	Stadium: Stadio delle Alpi; Attendance: 69,000; Referee: Mario van der Ende (Netherlands)

===== Semi-finals =====
3 April 1996 First leg	Juventus (Italy)	2–0	(France) Nantes	Turin, Italy
20:30 CEST (UTC+02:00)	Vialli 49'; Jugović 66'	Report	Gourvennec (yellow card) 24'; Carotti (red card) 44'; Ferri (yellow card) 56'; Guyot (yellow card) 75'; Pignol (yellow card) 79'; Le Dizet (yellow card) 81'	Stadium: Stadio delle Alpi; Attendance: 55,000; Referee: Dermot Gallagher (England)

17 April 1996 Second leg	Nantes (France)	3–2 (3–4 agg.)	(Italy) Juventus	Nantes, France
20:30 CEST (UTC+02:00)	Capron 44'; N'Doram 69'; Renou 82'	Report	Vialli 17'; Paulo Sousa 50'	Stadium: Stade de la Beaujoire; Attendance: 35,000; Referee: Sándor Puhl (Hungary)

===== Final =====
22 May 1996 Final	Ajax (Netherlands)	1–1 (a.e.t.) (2–4 p)	(Italy) Juventus	Rome, Italy
20:30 CEST (UTC+02:00)	George (yellow card) 22'; Litmanen 40'; Blind (yellow card) 83'; Wooter (yellow card) 90+2'	Report	Ravanelli 12'; Jugović (yellow card) 50'; Deschamps (yellow card) 86'; Torricelli (yellow card) 102'; Di Livio (yellow card) 106'	Stadium: Stadio Olimpico; Attendance: 67,000; Referee: Manuel Díaz Vega (Spain)
	Penalties
	Davids (penalty missed); Litmanen (penalty scored); Scholten (penalty scored); Silooy (penalty missed)		(penalty scored) Ferrara; (penalty scored) Pessotto; (penalty scored) Padovano; (penalty scored) Jugović

== Statistics ==
=== Players statistics ===
No.	Pos	Nat	Player	Total		Serie A		Coppa Italia		Champions League	
No.	Pos	Nat	Player	Apps	Goals	Apps	Goals	Apps	Goals	Apps	Goals
1	GK	(Italy) ITA	Peruzzi	40	-35	29+1	-26	0	0	10	-9
3	DF	(Italy) ITA	Torricelli	38	2	27+1	1	2	0	8	1
2	DF	(Italy) ITA	Ferrara	41	3	31	3	1	0	8+1	0
20	DF	(Italy) ITA	Vierchowod	30	2	18+3	2	1	0	7+1	0
22	DF	(Italy) ITA	Pessotto	39	0	22+6	0	1	0	9+1	0
7	MF	(Italy) ITA	Di Livio	43	1	22+10	0	2	0	7+2	1
14	MF	(France) FRA	Deschamps	39	2	27+3	2	1	0	8	0
6	MF	(Portugal) POR	Paulo Sousa	36	1	27+1	0	0	0	7+1	1
9	FW	(Italy) ITA	Vialli	37	13	29+1	11	0	0	7	2
10	FW	(Italy) ITA	Del Piero	42	13	25+4	6	2	1	9+2	6
11	FW	(Italy) ITA	Ravanelli	35	17	23+3	12	2	1	6+1	4
12	GK	(Italy) ITA	Rampulla	12	-11	5+4	-9	2	-2	1	0
8	MF	(Italy) ITA	Conte	40	7	22+7	5	2	0	8+1	2
4	DF	(Italy) ITA	Carrera	29	0	16+4	0	2	0	5+2	0
15	MF	(Italy) ITA	Tacchinardi	22	0	14+2	0	2	0	3+1	0
18	MF	(Federal Republic of Yugoslavia) YUG	Jugovic	35	4	14+12	2	1	1	5+3	1
5	DF	(Italy) ITA	Porrini	24	0	9+6	0	2	0	7	0
19	MF	(Italy) ITA	Lombardo	17	2	8+5	2	0	0	1+3	0
21	FW	(Italy) ITA	Padovano	30	7	5+16	4	1	1	4+4	2
13	MF	(Italy) ITA	Marocchi	16	1	1+7	0	1	0	2+5	1
23	DF	(Argentina) ARG	Sorin	5	0	0+2	0	2	0	0+1	0
16	DF	(Italy) ITA	Luca Fusi	1	0	0	0	0	0	1	0
24	GK	(Italy) ITA	Visentin	0	0	0	0	0	0	0	0
26	DF	(Italy) ITA	Loria	0	0	0	0	0	0	0	0
17	FW	(Italy) ITA	Rocchi	0	0	0	0	0	0	0	0
27	DF	(Italy) ITA	Baccin	0	0	0	0	0	0	0	0

- Source: http://calcio-seriea.net/presenze/1995/1096/
