= 1993–94 Juventus FC season =

Italian football club season

Juventus
1993–94 season
- President: Vittorio Caissotti di Chiusano
- Head Coach: Giovanni Trapattoni
- Stadium: Stadio delle Alpi
- Serie A: 2nd (in UEFA Cup)
- Coppa Italia: Second round
- UEFA Cup: Quarter-finals
- Top goalscorer: League: Roberto Baggio (17); All: Roberto Baggio (22)
- Average home league attendance: 44,520
Home colours	Away colours

Juventus Football Club finished second in Serie A this season.

== Overview ==
The summer of 1993 saw the arrival of Angelo Di Livio from Padova, Andrea Fortunato from Genoa and Sergio Porrini from Atalanta. Departures from the club included Pierluigi Casiraghi, Paolo Di Canio and David Platt.

Juventus finished second in Serie A to Milan, who would also win the 1993–94 UEFA Champions League. Although Roberto Baggio would finish as top scorer (in both Serie A and in total), the season was notable for the emergence of Alessandro Del Piero. Del Piero made his Serie A debut against Foggia on 12 September 1993 as a substitute, and he scored his first goal in his next match, against Reggiana on 19 September, after coming off the bench once again. On his full debut for Juventus, against Parma, he scored a hat-trick. The season also marked the end of the second spell in charge of Giovanni Trapattoni, who moved onto Bayern Munich in the summer of 1994. He was replaced by Marcello Lippi.

== Squad ==
Note: Flags indicate national team as defined under FIFA eligibility rules; some limited exceptions apply. Players may hold more than one non-FIFA nationality.

Pos.	Nation	Player
GK	ITA	Angelo Peruzzi
GK	ITA	Michelangelo Rampulla
DF	ITA	Francesco Baldini
DF	ITA	Massimo Carrera
DF	ITA	Alessandro Dal Canto
DF	ITA	Andrea Fortunato
DF	BRA	Júlio César
DF	GER	Jürgen Kohler
DF	ITA	Sergio Porrini
DF	ITA	Moreno Torricelli
MF	ITA	Dino Baggio

Pos.	Nation	Player
MF	ITA	Antonio Conte
MF	ITA	Angelo Di Livio
MF	ITA	Gianluca Francesconi
MF	ITA	Roberto Galia
MF	ITA	Giancarlo Marocchi
MF	GER	Andreas Möller
FW	ITA	Roberto Baggio (Captain)
FW	CRO	Zoran Ban
FW	ITA	Alessandro Del Piero
FW	ITA	Fabrizio Ravanelli
FW	ITA	Gianluca Vialli

=== Transfers ===
In
Pos.	Name	from	Type
FW	Alessandro Del Piero	Calcio Padova	-
DF	Sergio Porrini	Atalanta B.C.	-
DF	Andrea Fortunato	Genoa C.F.C.	
MF	Angelo Di Livio	Calcio Padova	-
FW	Zoran Ban	NK Rijeka	-

Out
Pos.	Name	To	Type
MF	David Platt	Sampdoria	
FW	Pierluigi Casiraghi	S.S. Lazio	
DF	Marco De Marchi	Bologna F.C.	
FW	Paolo Di Canio	S.S.C. Napoli	loan
DF	Luigi Sartor	A.C. Reggiana 1919	loan

== Competitions ==
=== Serie A ===
==== League table ====
Pos	Team	Pld	W	D	L	GF	GA	GD	Pts	Qualification or relegation
1	Milan (C)	34	19	12	3	36	15	+21	50	Qualified to Champions League
2	Juventus	34	17	13	4	58	25	+33	47	Qualification to UEFA Cup
3	Lazio	34	17	10	7	55	40	+15	44	Qualification to UEFA Cup
4	Sampdoria	34	18	8	8	64	39	+25	44	Qualification to Cup Winners' Cup
5	Parma	34	17	7	10	50	35	+15	41	Qualification to UEFA Cup

Source: 1993–94 Serie A, RSSSF.com, Soccerway
Rules for classification: 1) Points; 2) Head-to-head points; 3) Head-to-head goal difference; 4) Goal difference; 5) Goals scored; 6) Draw. (Note: Head-to-head record is used only after all the matches between the teams in question have been played).
(C) Champions

==== Results by round ====
Round	1	2	3	4	5	6	7	8	9	10	11	12	13	14	15	16	17	18	19	20	21	22	23	24	25	26	27	28	29	30	31	32	33	34
Ground	H	A	H	A	H	A	H	H	A	H	A	H	A	H	A	H	A	A	H	A	H	A	H	A	A	H	A	H	A	H	A	H	A	H
Result	W	L	W	D	W	D	W	W	D	W	L	D	D	W	L	W	W	D	D	D	W	D	W	D	W	L	D	W	W	W	D	W	D	W
Position	1	6	4	5	4	5	4	2	3	1	3	4	4	3	4	3	2	3	2	2	2	3	2	2	2	3	4	2	2	2	2	2	2	2

Source: Competitive matches
A = Away; H = Home; W = Win; D = Draw; L = Loss; = 1994–95 UEFA Champions League; = 1994–95 UEFA Cup

==== Matches ====
29 August 1993 1	Juventus	1–0	Cremonese	Turin
	Möller 5'	Report		Stadium: Stadio delle Alpi

5 September 1993 2	Roma	2–1	Juventus	Rome
	Balbo 34'; Muzzi 81'	Report	(penalty missed) 51' Baggio; (penalty missed) 59'Vialli; 62'Vialli; 78' Möller	Stadium: Olimpico

8 September 1993 3	Juventus	3–1	Sampdoria	Turin
	Conte 28'; R. Baggio 47'; Möller 64'	Report	Gullit 27'	Stadium: Stadio delle Alpi

12 September 1993 4	Foggia	1–1	Juventus	Foggia
	Roy 63'	Report	Ravanelli 68'	Stadium: Stadio Pino Zaccheria

19 September 1993 5	Juventus	4–0	Reggiana	Turin
	Ravanelli 56'; Möller 58'; R. Baggio 77'; Del Piero 81'	Report		Stadium: Stadio delle Alpi

26 September 1993 6	Lecce	1–1	Juventus	Lecce
	Baldieri 23'	Report	R. Baggio 68' (pen.)	Stadium: Stadio Via del Mare

3 October 1993 7	Juventus	3–2	Torino	Turin
	Conte 9'; Möller 30'; Kohler 79'	Report	D. Fortunato 12'; Sergio 37'	Stadium: Stadio delle Alpi

17 October 1993 8	Juventus	2–1	Atalanta	Turin
	R. Baggio 56' (pen.); Möller 60'	Report	Ganz 70'	Stadium: Stadio delle Alpi

24 October 1993 9	Milan	1–1	Juventus	Milan
	Albertini 75'	Report	R. Baggio 61' (pen.)	Stadium: San Siro

31 October 1993 10	Juventus	4–0	Genoa	Turin
	R. Baggio 35' (pen.), 56', 77' (pen.); Möller 51'	Report	(red card) 49' Corrado	Stadium: delle Alpi

7 November 1993 11	Parma	2–0	Juventus	Parma
	Zola 83'; Brolin 87' (pen.)	Report		Stadium: Stadio Ennio Tardini

21 November 1993 12	Juventus	1–1	Cagliari	Turin
	Kohler 85'	Report	67' Oliveira; (red card) 74' Moriero	Stadium: Stadio delle Alpi

28 November 1993 13	Internazionale	2–2	Juventus	Milan
	Sosa 33', 90' (pen.)	Report	55' Baggio; (red card) 63' Conte; 77' Möller	Stadium: San Siro

5 December 1993 14	Juventus	1–0	Napoli	Turin
	Ferrara 28' (o.g.); Vialli 67'	Report	(yellow card) 87' (yellow-red card) Bia	Stadium: Stadio delle Alpi

12 December 1993 15	Lazio	3–1	Juventus	Rome
	Kohler 49' (o.g.); Bokšić 59'; Gascoigne 90'	Report	Fortunato 54'	Stadium: Stadio Olimpico

19 December 1993 16	Juventus	2–0	Piacenza	Turin
	Baggio 56'; Conte 61'; Del Piero 74'; Ravanelli 87'	Report	(yellow card) 82' (yellow-red card) Carannante	Stadium: Stadio delle Alpi

2 January 1994 17	Udinese	0–3	Juventus	Udine
		Report	Marocchi 19'; S. Pellegrini 49' (o.g.); Baggio 62'	Stadium: Stadio Friuli

9 January 1994 18	Cremonese	1–1	Juventus	Cremona
	Giandebiaggi 43'	Report	Baggio 25'	Stadium: Stadio Giovanni Zini

16 January 1994 19	Juventus	0–0	Roma	Turin
	Kohler (red card) 44'	Report	(red card) 44' Bonacina	Stadium: Stadio delle Alpi

23 January 1994 20	Sampdoria	1–1	Juventus	Genoa
	Lombardo 28' (pen.)	Report	Ravanelli 81'	Stadium: Stadio Luigi Ferraris

30 January 1994 21	Juventus	2–0	Foggia	Turin
	Ravanelli 70'; Baggio 80'	Report		Stadium: Stadio delle Alpi

6 February 1994 22	Reggiana	0–0	Juventus	Reggio Emilia
		Report		Stadium: Stadio Mirabello

13 February 1994 23	Juventus	5–1	Lecce	Turin
	Möller 2'; Marocchi 25'; Ravanelli 26', 67'; R. Baggio 51'	Report	Ayew 60'	Stadium: Stadio delle Alpi

20 February 1994 24	Torino	1–1	Juventus	Turin
	D. Fortunato 64'	Report	Möller (red card) 34'; 54' R. Baggio	Stadium: Stadio delle Alpi

27 February 1994 25	Atalanta	1–3	Juventus	Bergamo
	Ganz 6'	Report	Conte 52'; R. Baggio 81' (pen.), 84'	Stadium: Comunale

6 March 1994 26	Juventus	0–1	Milan	Turin
		Report	Eranio 60'	Stadium: Stadio delle Alpi

13 March 1994 27	Genoa	1–1	Juventus	Genoa
	Galante 88'	Report	36' (red card) 70' Del Piero	Stadium: Stadio Luigi Ferraris

20 March 1994 28	Juventus	4–0	Parma	Turin
	Del Piero 20'; Del Piero 57'; Baggio 65'; Ravanelli 77'; Del Piero 87'	Report		Stadium: Stadio delle Alpi

25 March 1994 29	Cagliari	0–1	Juventus	Cagliari
		Report	46' Del Piero; 83' (pen.) Ravanelli	Stadium: Stadio Sant'Elia

2 April 1994 30	Juventus	1–0	Internazionale	Turin
	Ferri 85' (o.g.)	Report		Stadium: Stadio delle Alpi

9 April 1994 31	Napoli	0–0	Juventus	Naples
		Report		Stadium: Stadio San Paolo

17 April 1994 32	Juventus	6–1	Lazio	Turin
	Vialli 7', 73', 83'; Bacci 10' (o.g.); Kohler 14'; R. Baggio 89'	Report	Signori 57'	Stadium: Stadio delle Alpi

24 April 1994 33	Piacenza	0–0	Juventus	Piacenza
		Report

29 April 1994 34	Juventus	1–0	Udinese	Turin
	Vialli 44'	Report		Stadium: Stadio delle Alpi

=== Coppa Italia ===
Second round

6 October 1993	Juventus	1–1	Venezia	Turin
20:30 CEST	R. Baggio 34' (pen.)	Report	Campilongo 45' (pen.)	Stadium: Stadio delle Alpi; Referee: Fucci

27 October 1993	Venezia	4–3 (5–4 agg.)	Juventus	Venice
20:30 CET	Campilongo 46', 70' (pen.), 82' (pen.); Cerbone 86'	Report	45' Marocchi; 78' (pen.) R. Baggio; 88' Di Livio	Stadium: Stadio Pier Luigi Penzo; Referee: Ceccarini

=== UEFA Cup ===
First round

15 September 1993	Juventus (Italy)	3–0	(Russia) Lokomotiv Moscow	Bologna
	R. Baggio 49', 86'; Ravanelli 69'	Report		Stadium: Stadio Renato Dall'Ara; Attendance: 26 267; Referee: (Austria) Alfred Wieser

28 September 1993	Lokomotiv Moscow (Russia)	0–1	(Italy) Juventus	Moscow
		Report	Marocchi 53'	Stadium: Lokomotiv Stadium; Attendance: 7 000; Referee: (Denmark) Kim Milton Nielsen

Second round

20 October 1993	Kongsvinger (Norway)	1–1	(Italy) Juventus	Kongsvinger
	Frigård 90'	Report	Kohler 60'

2 November 1993	Juventus (Italy)	2–0	(Norway) Kongsvinger	Turin
	Möller 27'; Ravanelli 68'	Report		Stadium: delle Alpi

Eightfinals

24 November 1993	Juventus (Italy)	3–0	(Spain) Tenerife	Turin
	Möller 4'; R. Baggio 69' (pen.); Ravanelli 75'	Report		Stadium: delle Alpi; Attendance: 9,500; Referee: (Germany) Bernd Heynemann

8 December 1993	Tenerife (Spain)	2–1	(Italy) Juventus	Santa Cruz de Tenerife
	Aguilera 37' del Solar 88'	Report	Möller 86'	Stadium: Estadio Heliodoro Rodríguez López; Attendance: 18 000; Referee: (Hungary) Sándor Puhl

Quarterfinals

1 March 1994	Cagliari (Italy)	1–0	(Italy) Juventus	Cagliari
	Dely Valdés 60'	Report		Stadium: Sant'Elia

15 March 1994	Juventus (Italy)	1–2	(Italy) Cagliari	Turin
	D. Baggio 23'	Report	Firicano 32'; Oliveira 62'	Stadium: delle Alpi

== Statistics ==
=== Player statistics ===
No.	Pos	Nat	Player	Total		Serie A		Coppa		UEFA	
No.	Pos	Nat	Player	Apps	Goals	Apps	Goals	Apps	Goals	Apps	Goals
	GK	(Italy) ITA	Peruzzi	39	-28	32	-23	1	-1	6	-4
	DF	(Italy) ITA	Torricelli	41	0	30+2	0	1	0	8	0
	DF	(Germany) GER	Kohler	35	4	27	3	1	0	7	1
	DF	(Italy) ITA	Porrini	39	0	28+2	0	2	0	7	0
	DF	(Italy) ITA	Fortunato	35	1	27	1	1	0	7	0
	MF	(Italy) ITA	Di Livio	37	1	33	0	2	1	2	0
	MF	(Italy) ITA	Marocchi	37	4	19+9	2	2	1	7	1
	MF	(Germany) GER	Möller	38	12	30	9	1	0	7	3
	MF	(Italy) ITA	Conte	41	4	32	4	1	0	8	0
	FW	(Italy) ITA	Baggio	41	22	32	17	2	2	7	3
	FW	(Italy) ITA	Ravanelli	38	12	25+5	9	2	0	6	3
	GK	(Italy) ITA	Rampulla	6	-5	2+1	0	1	-4	2	-1
	MF	(Italy) ITA	Dino Baggio	25	0	17	0	2	0	6	0
	DF	(Brazil) BRA	Júlio César	17	0	11	0	2	0	4	0
	DF	(Italy) ITA	Carrera	17	0	8+7	0	0	0	2	0
	FW	(Italy) ITA	Vialli	12	4	7+3	4	0	0	2	0
	DF	(Italy) ITA	Notari	6	0	5+1	0				
	MF	(Italy) ITA	Galia	23	0	4+14	0	1	0	4	0
	FW	(Italy) ITA	Del Piero	14	5	4+7	5	1	0	2	0
	MF	(Italy) ITA	Francesconi	8	0	1+3	0	1	0	3	0
	DF	(Italy) ITA	Baldini	3	0	0+3	0				
	FW	(Croatia) CRO	Ban	5	0	0+2	0	1	0	2	0
	GK	(Italy) ITA	Marchioro	0	0	0	0				
	MF	(Italy) ITA	Manfredini	0	0	0	0				
	MF	(Italy) ITA	Moro	0	0	0	0				

- Source: http://calcio-seriea.net/presenze/1993/1058/

=== Squad statistics ===
Competition	Record								Result	Top Scorer
Competition	G	W	D	L	GF	GA	GD	Win %	Result	Top Scorer
Serie A	34	17	13	4	58	25	+33	50.00	Runners-up	(Italy) Roberto Baggio, 17
Coppa Italia	2	0	1	1	4	5	−1	0.00	Second Round	(Italy) Roberto Baggio, 2
UEFA Cup	8	4	1	3	12	6	+6	50.00	Quarter Finals	(Italy) Roberto Baggio, 3 (Germany) Andreas Möller, 3 (Italy) Fabrizio Ravanelli, 3
Total	44	21	15	8	74	36	+38	47.73		(Italy) Roberto Baggio, 22
