= Gianluca Pessotto =

Italian footballer (born 1970)

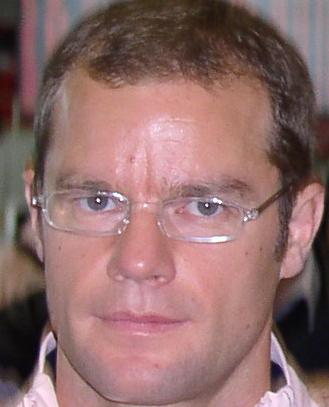
- Pessotto in 2006

Personal information
- Full name: Gianluca Pessotto
- Date of birth: 11 August 1970 (age 56)
- Place of birth: Latisana, Italy
- Height: 1.73 m (5 ft 8 in)
- Positions: Defender; midfielder

Youth career
- 1987–1989: AC Milan

Senior career*
Years	Team	Apps	(Gls)
1989–1991	Varese	64	(1)
1991–1992	Massese	22	(1)
1992–1993	Bologna	21	(1)
1993–1994	Verona	34	(3)
1994–1995	Torino	32	(1)
1995–2006	Juventus	243	(2)
Total		416	(9)

International career
1996–2002	Italy	22	(0)
Medal record
Men's football
Representing Italy
UEFA European Championship
Runner-up	2000 Belgium-Netherlands
- * Club domestic league appearances and goals

Gianluca Pessotto Cavaliere OMRI (Italian pronunciation: [dʒanˈluːka pesˈsɔtto]; born 11 August 1970) is an Italian former professional footballer who played as a defender or midfielder. A former Italy international, he spent the majority of his club career with Juventus, where he won several domestic and international trophies, and is now head of its youth system. He represented his country at the 1998 FIFA World Cup, and at UEFA Euro 2000, reaching the final of the latter tournament.

After his retirement in 2006, Pessotto remained at Juventus as a member of the coaching staff. He is currently the Sporting Director (Direttore Sportivo) of the club's youth academy.

Pessotto was given the nickname Il Professorino ("The Little Professor") by the fans, due to his glasses, his interest in philosophy and literature, and as he was able to obtain a law degree during his career. His stamina and ability to run very quickly – indeed he was often described as almost "flying" on field in the media – also earned him the nickname "Passerotto" ("Little Sparrow").

== Club career ==
=== Milan ===
Born in Latisana, in the province of Udine, Pessotto started his career in the AC Milan youth system. However, he was instantly sold to AS Varese 1910 in 1989. He never made a professional appearance for Milan.

=== Varese ===
After joining Varese in 1989, Pessotto officially began his professional career. In two full seasons with the club, he tallied an impressive 64 appearances, also finding the back of the net on a solo occasion.

=== Massese ===
In August 1991, Pessotto transferred to US Massese 1919, although he only remained at the club for one season. In his lone season, he appeared 23 times in the league, netting one goal.

=== Bologna ===
Following impressive spells with both AS Varese 1910 and US Massese 1919 he transferred to then-Serie B club Bologna FC 1909 in the summer of 1992. Despite being a highly anticipated transfer, Pessotto made just 21 league appearances and was sold at the conclusion of the season. He also scored one goal for the Bolognese club.

=== Verona ===
After a season with Bologna in Serie B, Pessotto transferred to fellow Serie B club Hellas Verona FC in 1993. Pessotto was an undisputed starter for much of the season, impressing greatly. He made 34 league appearances with a seasonal career high of 3 goals.

=== Torino ===
After impressing in the second division of Italian football, Pessotto transferred to Torino FC in 1994. In his first season in Serie A, Pessotto racked up a starting position along with 32 league appearances and his first Serie A goal. After greatly impressing in his debut Serie A season, Pessotto moved to city rivals and European giants Juventus, in 1995, in what was a very highly regarded transfer.

=== Juventus ===
After joining Juventus in 1995, Pessotto instantly became a key part of the first team and helped Juventus form what was considered to be one of the best defences in the world at this time. Teams strongly regretted ever going down a goal to the club as they knew how hard it would be to score one back for themselves. Pessotto formed impressive defensive partnerships with the likes of Ciro Ferrara, Moreno Torricelli, Paolo Montero, Mark Iuliano, Lilian Thuram, Alessandro Birindelli, Igor Tudor, Gianluca Zambrotta, Nicola Legrottaglie, Fabio Cannavaro, Jonathan Zebina, and Giorgio Chiellini during his 12-year tenure with the club. He was one of many experienced players who had been at Juventus for a lengthy period of time. Injuries and other issues in the closing stages of his career limited his first-team opportunities to mainly being used as a substitute to Jonathan Zebina or Lilian Thuram. Pessotto retired at the end of the 2005–2006 Serie A season, after back to back Scudetti. With Juventus he managed well over 250 total appearances scoring 2 league goals in the process. Among his achievements as a Juventus player, Pessotto won the UEFA Champions League in 1996 (scoring a penalty in Juventus's shoot-out victory over Ajax), playing in 4 Champions League Finals, the UEFA Super Cup in 1996, the Intercontinental Cup in 1996, a UEFA Intertoto Cup in 2000, four Scudetti (1997, 1998, 2002, 2003), four Supercoppa Italiana titles (1997, 1998, 2002, 2003) and a Coppa Italia in 1995.

== International career ==
In total, Pessotto was capped 22 times for Italy between 1996 and 2002, under managers Arrigo Sacchi (1996), Cesare Maldini (1996–98), Dino Zoff (1998–2000) and Giovanni Trapattoni (2000–2002). He played for his country at the 1998 FIFA World Cup, where Italy were eliminated by hosts and eventual champions France on penalties in the quarter-finals, and at Euro 2000. At Euro 2000, Pessotto scored a penalty in the semi-final shootout win over co-hosts the Netherlands, which sent Italy into the final against France. In the final, Pessotto would set up Delvecchio's goal; however, he only picked up a runners-up medal as Italy lost to France for the second consecutive tournament, after conceding a last minute equaliser, and then subsequently conceding a David Trezeguet golden goal. Trezeguet became his Juventus teammate the following season. He was unable to take part at the 2002 World Cup with Italy due to injury.

== Style of play ==
Despite initially not being known as the most naturally talented, flashy, or technically gifted footballer, Pessotto was considered to be a promising prospect in his youth, and later made a name for himself as a tactically intelligent, efficient, and versatile utility player, with solid ball control and a good positional sense, who was able to play as an attacking full-back or wing-back, or also as a wide midfielder on either flank. Despite being naturally right-footed, he was capable of playing with either foot, and he usually preferred to play on the left side of the pitch. In this role, he was known for his pace, calm composure, reading of the game, and stamina, as well as his ability to chase and close down opponents, win back the ball with his tackles, and subsequently carry it up the flank, play exchanges with teammates, get forward, and deliver crosses into the area, courtesy of his distribution and ability to make attacking runs, which enabled him to cover the flank effectively. He was also capable of playing as a central or defensive midfielder, and was even used as a centre-back on occasion, due to his consistency, awareness, and man-marking ability. He was also an accurate penalty taker. In spite of his reserved character, his sportsmanship, fair-play attitude, professionalism, discipline, and elegant playing style made him a respected figure in the dressing room, among both his teammates and managers.

== Coaching career ==
Following his retirement, Pessotto was successively appointed as the new Juventus team manager.

=== Alleged suicide attempt ===
Weeks after his retirement as a footballer, he survived a 15-metre fall from a fourth storey window at the headquarters of Juventus, on 27 June 2006. As he was holding a rosary, it is believed that he was attempting suicide in the wake of the Calciopoli scandal which led his club to be stripped of two Serie A titles and relegated in Serie B for their first time in history. He suffered multiple fractures and internal bleeding from the fall. On 17 July 2006, medical staff declared him out of danger and stated that he would not have long-term mental damage or physical paralysis. His wife Reana later declared it had not been a suicide attempt, but that Pessotto had blacked-out.

After recovering Pessotto resumed his managerial duties. In the summer of 2009 he was appointed Primavera (U-20) coach, replacing former teammate Ciro Ferrara, who had just been named the new first team manager.

== Honours ==
=== Club ===
Juventus

- Serie A: 1996–97, 1997–98, 2001–02, 2002–03
- Supercoppa Italiana: 1995, 1997, 2002, 2003
- Intercontinental Cup: 1996
- UEFA Champions League: 1995–96
- UEFA Champions League runner-up: 1996–97, 1997–98, 2002–03
- UEFA Intertoto Cup: 1999
- UEFA Super Cup: 1996

=== International ===
Italy

- UEFA European Championship runner-up: 2000

=== Individual ===
- Premio Nazionale Carriera Esemplare "Gaetano Scirea": 1995
- Juventus FC Hall of Fame: 2025

=== Orders ===

5th Class / Knight: Cavaliere Ordine al Merito della Repubblica Italiana: 2000
