= Sergio Porrini =

Italian football coach and former player (born 1968)

Personal information
- Date of birth: 8 November 1968 (age 58)
- Place of birth: Milan, Italy
- Height: 1.80 m (5 ft 11 in)
- Position: Centre-back

Team information
- Current team: Albania (assistant coach)

Senior career*
Years	Team	Apps	(Gls)
1986–1989	Milan	0	(0)
1989–1993	Atalanta	100	(3)
1993–1997	Juventus	87	(3)
1997–2001	Rangers	80	(6)
2001–2003	Alessandria	34	(0)
2003–2004	Padova	43	(0)
2004–2009	Pizzighettone	101	(0)
Total		445	(12)

International career
1993	Italy	2	(0)

Managerial career
- 2011–2012: Colognese
- 2012–2013: Pontisola
- 2013–2015: Atalanta Youth
- 2016–2017: Crema
- 2018–2019: Ciserano
- * Club domestic league appearances and goals

Sergio Porrini (Italian pronunciation: [ˈsɛrdʒo porˈriːni]; born 8 November 1968) is an Italian football coach and former centre-back and right-back defender.

Porrini played for several Italian clubs throughout his career, although he is most well known for his periods at Juventus, and Scottish club Rangers, where he won several titles. He has also served as an assistant coach for the Albania national football team.

== Club career ==
After growing up in the A.C. Milan youth system (without playing for the first team), Porrini made his senior debut in 1989 for Atalanta, remaining with the club for four seasons.

After attracting attention from larger clubs, he joined Juventus in 1993 for 11 billion Lit., featuring as a starter during the 1993–94 season under manager Giovanni Trapattoni. During the 1994–95 season, however, he had difficulty finding a place in the team's starting line-up under the club's new manager Marcello Lippi; due to Lippi's new three-man back-line, Porrini faced heavy competition from other defenders, such as Moreno Torricelli, and Jürgen Kohler, as well as back-up Massimo Carrera and the newly acquired Ciro Ferrara. Despite his limited appearances for Juventus during the season, Porrini still scored two goals over both legs of the club's 1995 Coppa Italia Final victory over Parma, and one goal in a 2–1 home win against Borussia Dortmund, in the second leg of the semi-final of the UEFA Cup. He captured his first Serie A title with the club that season.

Porrini made 20 appearances for the club during the 1995–96 season, which saw Juventus capture the 1995 Supercoppa Italiana, but remained on the sidelines as Juventus celebrated their victory on penalties over defending champions Ajax in the 1996 UEFA Champions League Final. During the 1996–97 season, he made 40 appearances, scoring two goals, one of which was the opening goal in Juventus's 6–1 away win over Paris Saint-Germain in the first leg of the 1996 UEFA Super Cup, helping the Turin club to win the title; Porrini picked up his second league title with the club that season. He also started in Juventus's 1–0 victory over River Plate in the 1996 Intercontinental Cup Final in Tokyo, and in the club's 3–1 defeat to Borussia Dortmund in the 1997 Champions League Final in Munich. Porrini eventually parted ways with the Turin side at the end of the season. Overall, Porrini made 87 league appearances for Juventus, scoring three goals, and 138 appearances for the club in all competitions, scoring five goals in total. With Juventus, Porrini won two Serie A medals, one Coppa Italia medal, and a Champions League medal during his four seasons with the team, as well as the Supercoppa Italiana, the UEFA Super Cup, and the Intercontinental Cup.

Porrini subsequently joined Scottish club Rangers in 1997, for £4 million. He won two Scottish Premier League and Scottish Cup medals, as well as a League Cup title during his four seasons at Rangers. He started off his Rangers career at centre-back alongside Richard Gough but new manager Dick Advocaat soon moved him to right-back where he remained until he left the club in 2001. In total, he made 133 appearances for the club in all competitions, scoring seven goals, six of which came in league play in 80 appearances.

He left Rangers to resume his football career in Italy at Alessandria for a season, later moving to Padova. After two seasons with Padova, Porrini joined lower-division side Pizzighettone in 2004 and retired after five full seasons spent with the small Lombardian club at Lega Pro Prima Divisione and Lega Pro Seconda Divisione levels, in 2009.

== International career ==
While at Juventus, Porrini gained two international caps for Italy in 1993, under manager Arrigo Sacchi, appearing in two 1994 FIFA World Cup qualifying matches. He made his international debut in a 6–1 home win over Malta, in Palermo, on 24 March, and his second and final appearance with Italy came on 14 April, in a 2–0 home victory over Estonia, in Trieste.

== Coaching career ==
After his retirement, Porrini agreed to stay with Pizzighettone as youth coach for a season, then filling a similar role at Pergocrema. In August 2011, he was then named head coach of Serie D club Colognese.

On 23 June 2012, he was named head coach of Serie D club Pontisola.

In 2019, he joined the Albania national football team as an assistant to Edoardo Reja, whom he previously assisted at Atalanta.

== Honours ==
=== Player ===
Juventus

- Serie A: 1994–95, 1996–97
- Coppa Italia: 1994–95
- Supercoppa Italiana: 1995, 1997
- UEFA Champions League: 1995–96
- UEFA Super Cup: 1996
- Intercontinental Cup: 1996
- UEFA Cup (Runner-up): 1994–95

Rangers

- Scottish Premier League: 1998–99, 1999–2000
- Scottish Cup: 1999–2000
- Scottish League Cup: 1998–99
