= 1996 UEFA Super Cup =

Paris Saint-Germain	Juventus
(France)	(Italy)
2	9
- on aggregate

First leg
Paris Saint-Germain	Juventus
1	6
- Date: 15 January 1997
- Venue: Parc des Princes, Paris
- Referee: Nikolai Levnikov (Russia)
- Attendance: 29,519

Second leg
Juventus	Paris Saint-Germain
3	1
- Date: 5 February 1997
- Venue: Stadio La Favorita, Palermo
- Referee: Serge Muhmenthaler (Switzerland)
- Attendance: 35,100

The 1996 UEFA Super Cup was a two-legged match that took place on 15 January 1997 and 5 February 1997 between Paris Saint-Germain of France, champions of the 1995–96 UEFA Cup Winners' Cup, and Juventus of Italy as winners of the 1995–96 UEFA Champions League. Juventus won the tie 9–2 on aggregate (a record margin in the history of the cup), humiliating PSG at the Parc des Princes 6–1, with goals from Sergio Porrini, Michele Padovano, Ciro Ferrara, Attilio Lombardo and Nicola Amoruso in the first leg (also a record) and winning the second leg 3–1 at Stadio La Favorita in Palermo after goals from Alessandro Del Piero and Christian Vieri.

As in the 1994–95 UEFA Cup, Juventus chose to play their home leg away from Turin due to poor attendances at the Stadio delle Alpi, in contrast to the big crowds they attracted playing in other cities.

== Match details ==
=== First leg ===
15 January 1997
20:30 CET

Paris Saint-Germain (France)	1–6	(Italy) Juventus
Raí 52' (pen.)	Report	Porrini 4'; Padovano 22', 40'; Ferrara 33'; Lombardo 83'; Amoruso 88'

Parc des Princes, Paris
Attendance: 29,519
Referee: Nikolai Levnikov (Russia)

Paris Saint-Germain	Juventus

GK	1	(France) Bernard Lama
RB	22	(France) Didier Domi		(substituted off) 55'
CB	6	(France) Paul Le Guen
CB	4	(France) Bruno Ngotty
LB	17	(France) Jimmy Algerino		(substituted off) 34'
CM	13	(France) Laurent Fournier	(yellow card) 23' (yellow-red card) 63'
CM	8	(France) Vincent Guérin
CM	19	(France) Jérôme Leroy
AM	10	(Brazil) Raí (c)	(yellow card) 55'
CF	11	(France) Patrice Loko
CF	9	(Panama) Julio Dely Valdés		(substituted off) 61'
Substitutes:
GK	16	(France) Vincent Fernandez
DF	2	(Portugal) Daniel Kenedy		(substituted on) 34'
MF	7	(Brazil) Leonardo		(substituted on) 55'
MF	12	(France) Bernard Allou
FW	20	(France) Cyrille Pouget		(substituted on) 61'
Manager:
(Brazil) Ricardo Gomes

GK	1	(Italy) Angelo Peruzzi (c)
RB	3	(Italy) Moreno Torricelli
CB	2	(Italy) Ciro Ferrara		(substituted off) 73'
CB	5	(Italy) Sergio Porrini
LB	22	(Italy) Gianluca Pessotto
DM	14	(France) Didier Deschamps	(yellow card) 28'
RM	7	(Italy) Angelo Di Livio
AM	21	(France) Zinedine Zidane
LM	20	(Italy) Alessio Tacchinardi		(substituted off) 67'
CF	11	(Italy) Michele Padovano		(substituted off) 73'
CF	10	(Italy) Alessandro Del Piero
Substitutes:
GK	12	(Italy) Michelangelo Rampulla
DF	4	(Uruguay) Paolo Montero
DF	13	(Italy) Mark Iuliano		(substituted on) 73'
MF	19	(Italy) Attilio Lombardo		(substituted on) 67'
FW	16	(Italy) Nicola Amoruso		(substituted on) 73'
Manager:
(Italy) Marcello Lippi

Assistant referees:
Serguei Foursa (Russia)
Serguei Frantsousov (Russia)
Fourth official:
Andrei Butenko (Russia)

Match rules

- 90 minutes.
- 30 minutes of golden goal extra time if necessary.
- Penalty shoot-out if scores still level.
- Five named substitutes.
- Maximum of three substitutions.

=== Second leg ===
5 February 1997
20:45 CET

Juventus (Italy)	3–1	(France) Paris Saint-Germain
Del Piero 36', 70'; Vieri 90+3'	Report	Raí 64' (pen.)

Stadio La Favorita, Palermo
Attendance: 35,100
Referee: Serge Muhmenthaler (Switzerland)

Juventus	Paris Saint-Germain

GK	1	(Italy) Angelo Peruzzi (c)
RB	3	(Italy) Moreno Torricelli	(substituted off) 72'
CB	2	(Italy) Ciro Ferrara
CB	4	(Uruguay) Paolo Montero
LB	22	(Italy) Gianluca Pessotto
RM	7	(Italy) Angelo Di Livio
DM	20	(Italy) Alessio Tacchinardi	(substituted off) 68'
AM	21	(France) Zinedine Zidane
LM	18	(Federal Republic of Yugoslavia) Vladimir Jugović
CF	10	(Italy) Alessandro Del Piero
CF	11	(Italy) Michele Padovano	(substituted off) 68'
Substitutes:
GK	12	(Italy) Michelangelo Rampulla
DF	5	(Italy) Sergio Porrini	(substituted on) 72'
DF	13	(Italy) Mark Iuliano
MF	19	(Italy) Attilio Lombardo	(substituted on) 68'
FW	15	(Italy) Christian Vieri	(substituted on) 68'
Manager:
(Italy) Marcello Lippi

GK	1	(France) Bernard Lama
RB	2	(Portugal) Daniel Kenedy
CB	6	(France) Paul Le Guen
CB	22	(France) Didier Domi	(yellow card) 19'
LB	17	(France) Jimmy Algerino
RM	15	(France) Benoît Cauet
CM	8	(France) Vincent Guérin		(substituted off) 75'
LM	7	(Brazil) Leonardo		(substituted off) 80'
AM	10	(Brazil) Raí (c)
RF	9	(Panama) Julio Dely Valdés
LF	11	(France) Patrice Loko		(substituted off) 90'
Substitutes:
GK	16	(France) Vincent Fernandez
MF	12	(France) Bernard Allou		(substituted on) 80'
MF	18	(France) Roméo Calenda		(substituted on) 90'
MF	19	(France) Jérôme Leroy		(substituted on) 75'
FW	26	(France) Cyrille Pouget
Manager:
(Brazil) Ricardo Gomes

Assistant referees:
Martin Freiburghaus (Switzerland)
Peter Von Rohr (Switzerland)
Fourth official:
Carlo Bertolini (Switzerland)

Match rules

- 90 minutes.
- 30 minutes of golden goal extra time if necessary.
- Penalty shoot-out if scores still level.
- Five named substitutes.
- Maximum of three substitutions.

== See also ==
- 1996–97 UEFA Champions League
- 1996–97 UEFA Cup Winners' Cup
- 1996–97 Juventus FC season
- 1996–97 Paris Saint-Germain FC season
- Juventus FC in international football
- Paris Saint-Germain FC in international football
