= Michele Padovano =

Italian footballer

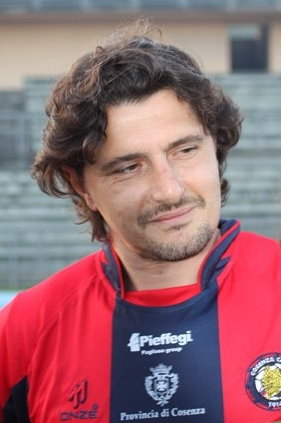
- Padovano in a Cosenza shirt in 2008

Personal information
- Date of birth: 28 August 1966 (age 60)
- Place of birth: Turin, Italy
- Height: 1.77 m (5 ft 9 1/2 in)
- Position: Striker

Senior career*
| Years | Team | Apps | (Gls) |
| 1985–1986 | Asti TSC | 24 | (6) |
| 1986–1990 | Cosenza | 103 | (22) |
| 1990–1991 | Pisa | 30 | (11) |
| 1991–1992 | Napoli | 27 | (7) |
| 1992–1993 | Genoa | 27 | (9) |
| 1993–1994 | Reggiana | 29 | (10) |
| 1994 | Genoa | 2 | (0) |
| 1994 | Reggiana | 19 | (7) |
| 1995–1997 | Juventus | 41 | (12) |
| 1997–1998 | Crystal Palace | 12 | (1) |
| 1998–2000 | Metz | 9 | (4) |
| 2000–2001 | Como | 12 | (2) |
| Total | | 335 | (91) |

International career
| 1997 | Italy | 1 | (0) |
- * Club domestic league appearances and goals

Michele Padovano (Italian pronunciation: [miˈkɛːle padoˈvaːno]; born 28 August 1966) is an Italian former footballer who played as a striker.

== Career ==
Padovano began his professional career at Asti T.S.C. in Serie C2, before short spells at Cosenza, Pisa, Napoli and Genoa. He then signed for Reggiana; his performances there caught the eye of Juventus manager Marcello Lippi, who signed him in the summer of 1995. With Juventus, he won the UEFA Champions League in 1996, in addition to other domestic and international titles, scoring a goal in the quarter-finals against Real Madrid, as well as a penalty during the shoot-out in the final against Ajax.

During his time with Juventus, Padovano was given his only cap for Italy by manager Cesare Maldini, who played him during the 3–0 home win over Moldova, on 29 March 1997. He came on after 68 minutes, replacing fellow debutant Christian Vieri.

Padovano was eventually placed in the reserves at Juventus. After a severe knee injury, Juventus sold him to Crystal Palace in November 1997 for £1.7 million. However Padovano struggled to adapt to the Premiership, hampered by injury and poor form. He scored just once against Leicester City in twelve appearances for the club. After falling out of favour at the south London club he was sold to Metz but failed to make an impression as once again he was injured and unable to play for some months. Metz were in financial difficulties and he later returned to Palace (who was then in receivership) in the 1999–2000 season to make a million-pound claim against the club's directors for lost wages.

Padovano finished his career with Como before retiring in 2001.

== Style of play ==
A fast and well–rounded forward, Padovano was known for his pace, heading, and acrobatic ability in the air, as well as his physical strength, despite his modest stature and build. He possessed an accurate and powerful shot with his left foot, and was known for his ability to strike the ball quickly; moreover, he was also an accurate penalty taker. Known for his tactical intelligence, intuition, and versatility, he was a useful player for his managers, who was known for his ability to start attacking plays with long balls or to provide depth to his team by losing his markers with his runs off the ball. Furthermore, he was known for having a penchant for frequently being decisive after coming off the bench.

== Imprisonment ==
In May 2006, Padovano was arrested by Italian police in Turin over allegation of his implication in hashish traffic. He was later sentenced to eight years and eight months in jail, then reduced to six years and eight months. He spent three months in jail and eight in house arrest waiting for judgement.

In 2021 the previous sentences got cancelled and in 2023 he has been finally declared not guilty and fully cleared of any wrongdoing.

== Honours ==
Cosenza

- Serie C1: 1987–88

Juventus

- Serie A: 1996–97
- Supercoppa Italiana: 1995, 1997
- UEFA Champions League: 1995–96
- UEFA Super Cup: 1996
- Intercontinental Cup: 1996

Como

- Serie C1: 2000–01
