= Massimiliano Maddaloni =

Italian association football player

Personal information
- Date of birth: 22 June 1966 (age 60)
- Place of birth: Naples, Italy
- Height: 1.90 m (6 ft 3 in)
- Position: Midfielder

Senior career*
Years	Team	Apps	(Gls)
1984–1985	Napoli	0	(0)
1985–1986	Rimini	?	(?)
1987–1988	Catania	?	(?)
1989–1990	Torres	?	(?)
1991–1992	Barletta	?	(?)

Managerial career
- 2000–2001: Viareggio (youth)
- 2001–2002: Viareggio
- 2002–2003: Forte dei Marmi
- 2003–2004: Versilia
- 2004–2005: Viareggio
- 2005–2006: Cecina
- 2008–2009: Juventus (youth)
- 2009–2010: Juventus (assistant)
- 2011: Carpi
- 2012–2015: Guangzhou Evergrande (assistant)
- 2016: Wuhan Zall (assistant)
- 2016–2019: China (assistant)
- 2017: China U20
- 2017–2018: China U22
- 2019–2020: Shenzhen FC (assistant)
- 2021: Siena
- * Club domestic league appearances and goals

Massimiliano Maddaloni (born 22 June 1966) is an Italian manager and former footballer who played predominantly as a midfielder, most recently in charge as the head coach of Serie C club Siena.

== Playing career ==
A midfielder, Maddaloni's playing career was short-lived and mostly spent in the Serie C league.

== Coaching career ==
Maddaloni started his coaching career in the early 2000s with Viareggio. He successively coached a number of Tuscan teams before accepting a job as a youth coach at Juventus in 2008.

He was successively appointed head coach of Serie C club Carpi for the 2011–12 season but resigned shortly thereafter on 10 October 2011. He successively moved to China working as an assistant to a number of Italian managers, including Marcello Lippi, Roberto Donadoni and Fabio Cannavaro, until 2020.

On 19 March 2019 he received the "Tommaso Maestrelli" career award.

On 25 October 2021, Maddaloni returned to Italy as the new head coach of Serie C club Siena, replacing Alberto Gilardino, with Michelangelo Rampulla as his assistant. They were both sacked just less than two months later, on 15 December, due to negative results.

== Career statistics ==
=== Club ===
Club	Season	League		Cup		Europe		Other		Total	
Club	Season	Apps	Goals	Apps	Goals	Apps	Goals	Apps	Goals	Apps	Goals
Napoli	1984-85	0	0	0	0	–	–	–	–	0	0
Rimini	1985–86	?	?	5	0	–	–	–	–	5	0
Catania	1987–88	?	?	5	1	–	–	–	–	5	1
Torres	1989–90	?	?	1	0	–	–	–	–	1	0
Barletta	1991–92	?	?	2	0	–	–	–	–	2	0
Career total		?	?	13	1	-	-	-	-	13	1
