= Michelangelo Rampulla =

Italian football player and manager (born 1962)

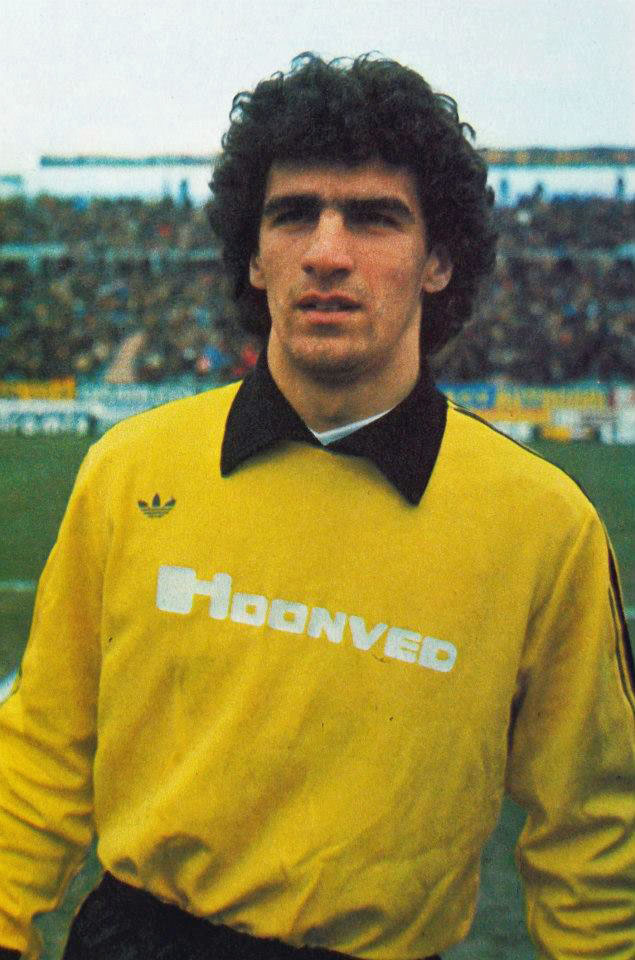
- Rampulla with Varese in 1983

Personal information
- Full name: Michelangelo Rampulla
- Date of birth: 10 August 1962 (age 64)
- Place of birth: Patti, Sicily, Italy
- Height: 1.87 m (6 ft 2 in)
- Position: Goalkeeper

Senior career*
Years	Team	Apps	(Gls)
1979–1980	Pattese	19	(0)
1980–1983	Cesena	96	(0)
1983–1985	Varese	73	(0)
1985–1992	Cremonese	249	(1)
1992–2002	Juventus	49	(0)
Total		486	(1)

International career
1982–1984	Italy U21	10	(0)

Managerial career
- 2011: Derthona
- * Club domestic league appearances and goals

Michelangelo Rampulla (born 10 August 1962) is an Italian football manager and former player who played as a goalkeeper.

== Club career ==
Born in Patti, Sicily, Rampulla initially had short stints with Sicilian amateur clubs, such as his local team Pattese; he later also played for Cesena, where he competed for a starting spot with fellow future Serie A goalkeepers Sebastiano Rossi and Alberto Fontana. After three seasons at Varese, Rampulla joined Cremonese in 1985 and became a protagonist in the club's rise to the Serie A league.

On 23 February 1992, Rampulla was the first goalkeeper to score from open play in Serie A history, after he equalised the scoreline with a header at 1–1 away to Atalanta, from a free-kick by Alviero Chiorri in the last minute of play. However, that hard-earned point was not enough to save them from relegation at the end of the season.

After the 1991–92 season finished in relegation for Cremonese, Rampulla moved to Juventus in 1992, where he enjoyed a highly successful ten-year spell at the club; he initially played as a starter, replacing Juventus's former legendary goalkeeper Stefano Tacconi, and subsequently as back-up goalkeeper for the remainder of his career, behind Angelo Peruzzi, Edwin van der Sar, and Gianluigi Buffon, and later as the reserve goalkeeper behind Andreas Isaksson and Fabian Carini, retiring from active football in 2002, following Juventus's Serie A title victory and Coppa Italia final defeat. Despite being predominantly a backup, he played matches in every competition for Juventus during almost every season of his Juventus career, in particular under Peruzzi during the mid 90s, when the latter was struggling with recurring injuries. During his time at the club, Rampulla won an UEFA Cup in 1993 (as a starter), a Coppa Italia in 1995 (as a starter), four Serie A titles, two Supercoppe Italiane (he replaced Peruzzi after he had been sent off in the 1995 edition of the tournament, contributing to his team's victory with several decisive saves), an UEFA Champions League, an UEFA Super Cup, an Intercontinental Cup, and an UEFA Intertoto Cup.

His goal-scoring feat would be matched by fellow Italian keeper Massimo Taibi nine years later.

== International career ==
During his time with Varese, Rampulla was called up to the Italy U20 national team by manager Azeglio Vicini, making his debut for the Azzurrini on 20 April 1983; in total he made ten appearances for the Italy under-21 side.

== Style of play ==
Nicknamed Big Ben, Rampulla was a large, solid and reliable shot-stopper, who stood out for his professionalism and longevity throughout his career. He was also known for his ability with the ball at his feet as a goalkeeper, and had initially always wanted to play as a forward in his youth, but his father insisted that he play in goal. Because of his skill on the ball and offensive instincts, Rampulla even took penalties on occasion, and he became the first goalkeeper ever to score a goal in Serie A, with a header off of a corner kick.

== Coaching career ==
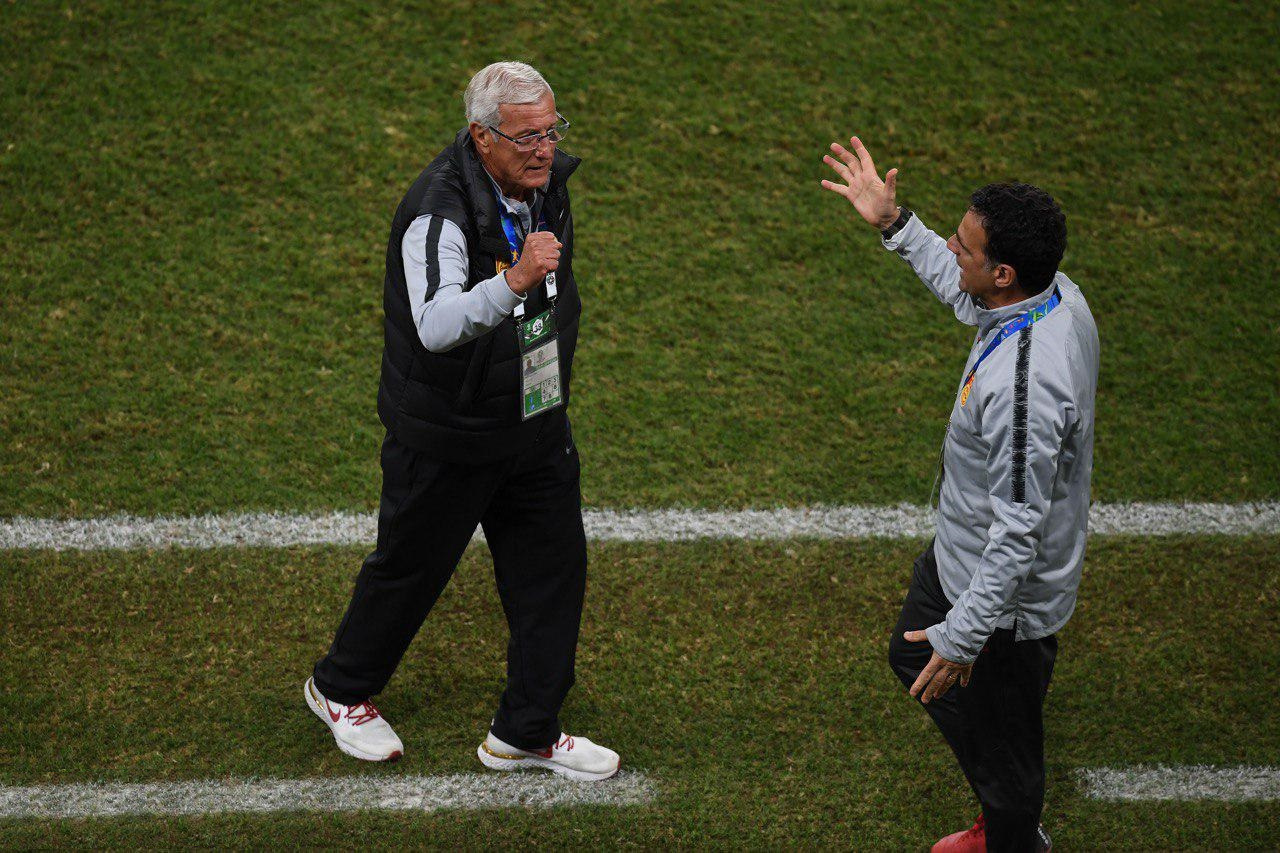
Marcello Lippi & Michelangelo Rampulla (2019)

After his retirement, Rampulla accepted to stay at Juventus in the club's backroom staff, serving as goalkeeping coach for most of his time. He parted company with Juventus in October 2010.

On 14 July 2011, he was introduced as new head coach of Serie D club Derthona. On 5 December 2011, he terminated his contract by mutual consent with the club.

On 17 May 2012, Rampulla joined former Juventus manager Marcello Lippi at Chinese Super League side Guangzhou Evergrande and became the club's goalkeeping coach.

On 2 June 2016, Rampulla became the president of Cremonese substituting Luigi Simoni who had covered the presidential role for two years. Rampulla resigned from this post on 20 October 2016 and on 22 October 2016, he was announced as the China national football team goalkeeping coach, under the management of Marcello Lippi.

On 25 October 2021, he was appointed as new head coach Massimiliano Maddaloni's assistant at Serie C club Siena. They were both sacked on 15 December 2021, just less than two months since their appointment, due to negative results.

== Honours ==
Juventus

- Serie A: 1994–95, 1996–97, 1997–98, 2001–02
- Coppa Italia: 1994–95
- Supercoppa Italiana: 1995, 1997
- UEFA Champions League: 1995–96
- UEFA Cup: 1992–93
- UEFA Super Cup: 1996
- Intercontinental Cup: 1996
- UEFA Intertoto Cup: 1999

Individual

- Premio Nazionale Carriera Esemplare "Gaetano Scirea": 1999
