= 1996 Intercontinental Cup =

- Match programme cover
| Juventus | River Plate |
| (Italy) | (Argentina) |
| 1 | 0 |
- Date: 26 November 1996
- Venue: National Stadium, Tokyo
- Man of the Match: Alessandro Del Piero (Juventus)
- Referee: Márcio Rezende de Freitas (Brazil)
- Attendance: 48,305

The 1996 Intercontinental Cup was a football match between Juventus of Italy and River Plate of Argentina on 26 November 1996 at the National Stadium in Tokyo, Japan. The annual Intercontinental Cup, it was contested between the winners of the UEFA Champions League and the Copa Libertadores. Juventus were appearing in their third Intercontinental Cup. They had lost the competition in 1973 before winning the 1985 edition. River Plate were making their second appearance after their victory in 1986.

The teams had qualified for the competition by winning their continent's primary cup competition. Juventus won the 1995–96 UEFA Champions League by beating Dutch team AFC Ajax 4–2 in a penalty shoot-out after the match finished 1–1. River Plate were the 1996 Copa Libertadores champions after winning the two-legged final 2–1 against América de Cali of Colombia.

Watched by a crowd of 48,305, the first half was goalless. Juventus took the lead late in the second half when Alessandro Del Piero scored. They held this lead to win the match 1–0, securing their second Intercontinental Cup win.

== Background ==
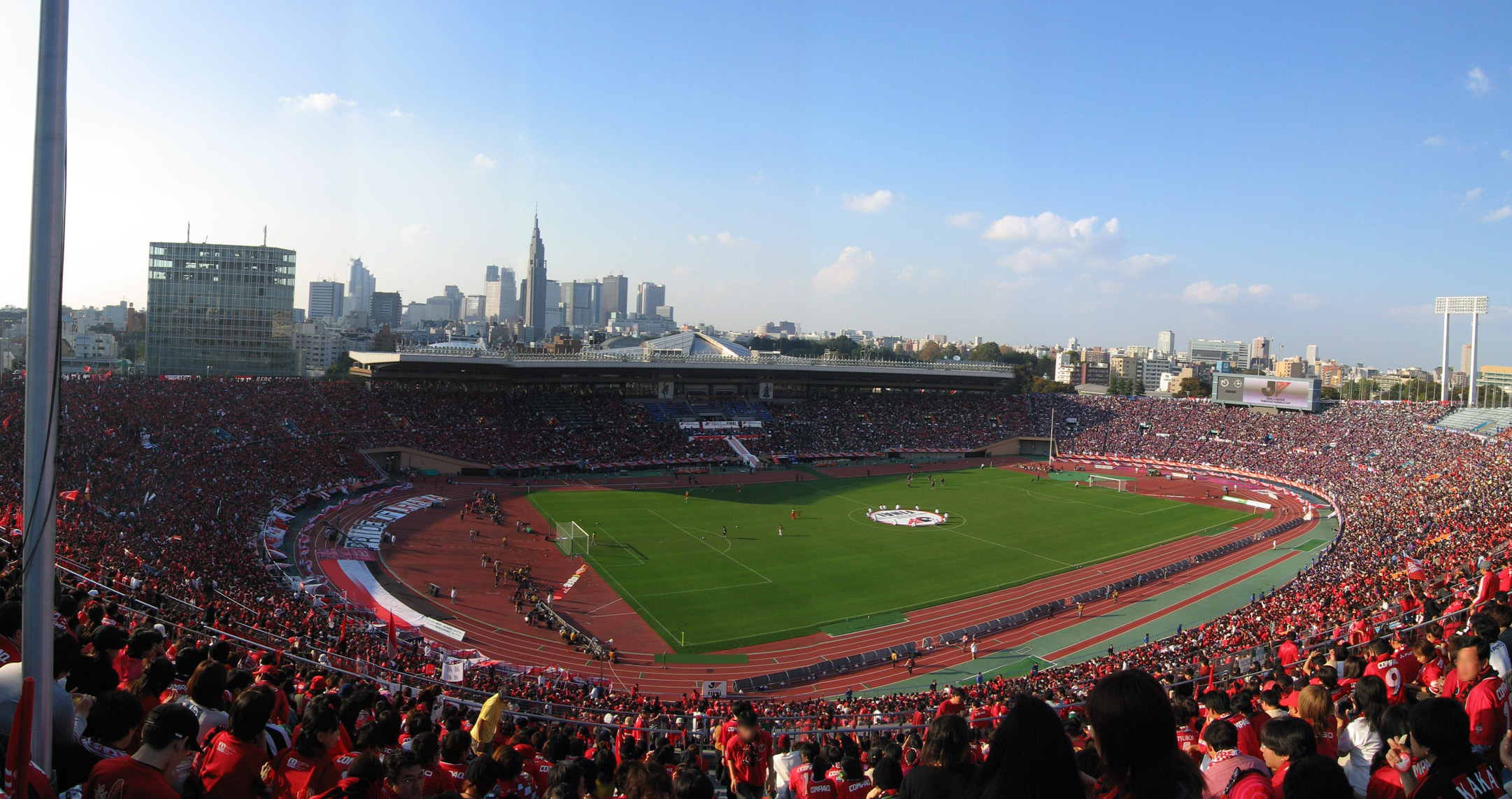
The National Stadium in Tokyo hosted the match

Juventus qualified for the Intercontinental Cup as a result of winning the UEFA Champions League. They won the 1995–96 UEFA Champions League by beating Dutch team AFC Ajax 4–2 in a penalty shoot-out after the match finished 1–1. This was their third appearance in the competition. Juventus had first played Independiente in the 1973 edition, losing 1–0. In 1985 they faced Argentinos Juniors, who they beat in a penalty shoot-out, after the match finished 2–2.

River Plate qualified for the Intercontinental Cup as the reigning 1996 Copa Libertadores champions. They beat América de Cali of Colombia 2–1 on aggregate to win their second Copa Libertadores. River Plate were making their second appearance in the competition. Their previous appearance in 1986 resulted in a 1–0 win against Romanian team Steaua București.

Juventus' last match before the Intercontinental Cup was against AC Milan in the 1996–97 Serie A, which finished in a scoreless draw. The last match River Plate played before the competition was against San Lorenzo in the 1996 Torneo Apertura. They won 4–0 courtesy of two goals from Julio Cruz and one apiece from Marcelo Salas and Ramón Medina Bello.

== Match ==
=== Summary ===
==== First half ====
From the start of the match, Juventus applied consistent pressure, as they looked to negate River Plate from orchestrating any opportunity product of their ball possession. For this purpose, they positioned their defense high up the field, and managed to suffocate their opposition courtesy of their anticipatory defending and recoveries by the midfield of Didier Deschamps, Angelo Di Livio and Vladimir Jugović. Furthermore, it allowed them to catch the opposition attackers offside twice. On one such occasion, however, River Plate were denied a chance when the assistant referee raised his flag, halting the play even though defenders Paolo Montero and Sergio Porrini were caught on a late run. Nonetheless, the Juventus game plan rendered the Argentine team unable to get ahold of the ball. In the midst of this pressure, goalkeeper Roberto Bonano stepped up to hold off the scoring prospects from the Italians, denying Alen Bokšić three times. Juan Pablo Sorín also contributed to maintaining the tie by saving a shot from Zinedine Zidane that was headed for the net. In response to this pressure, River Plate were only able to force a couple corner kicks. The offensive line for their side would produce their first shot on target at the 38-minute mark, through attacking midfielder Enzo Francescoli. In total, Juventus registered eight shots on target, while their opposition managed two. Nevertheless, the goalless scoreline remained at half-time.

==== Second half ====
The Argentine side made a recovery after the restart, as they managed ball possession in Juventus' half. During this time, the Italians started to rely on fouls to prevent the opposing efforts. Although this caused their attacks to lack depth, River Plate were able to threaten their opposition through crosses. In this context, Francescoli stepped up for his team, taking the set pieces and managing to funnel danger into the Juventus area. In the 51st minute, his first delivery met Sorín, whose header went wide. A minute later, a follow up cross was connected by Eduardo Berizzo, but the centre-back sent the ball across the goal. For their part, Juventus continued to have scoring prospects thanks to their offensive line, but Bonano kept fending off their efforts. Among them, he successfully defended a header from striker Alessandro Del Piero in the 57th minute.

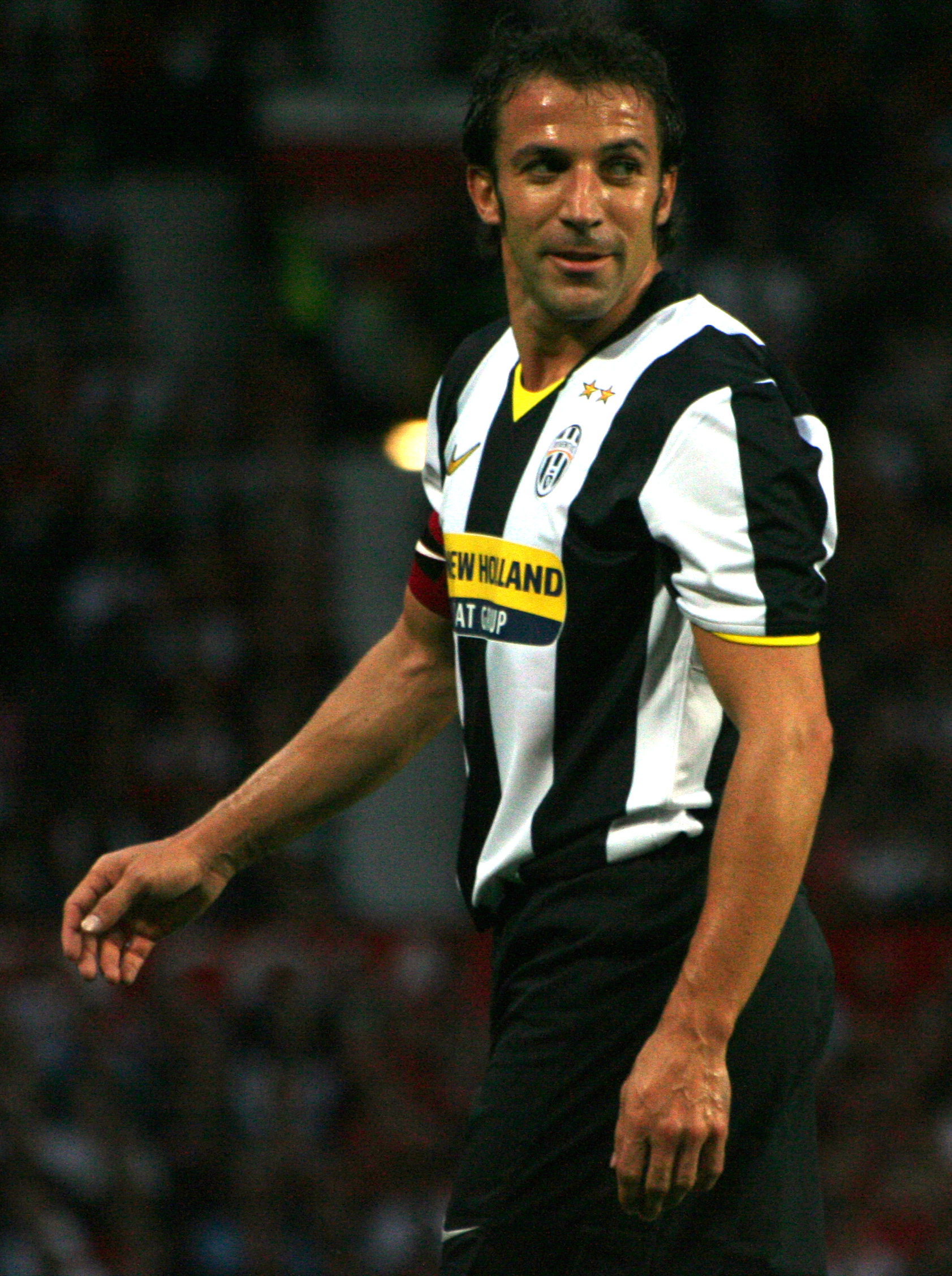
Alessandro Del Piero, who scored the solitary goal of the match.

At the 74-minute mark, River Plate manager Ramón Díaz made the first substitution of the match when he subbed Leonel Gancedo in for fellow midfielder Sergio Berti. Shortly after, the Argentine team had another chance through a free kick from Francescoli, which Hernán Díaz headed wide. Right afterward, their side would have their clearest opportunity through a play from the right, in which Roberto Monserrat linked up with the full-back. The sequence would eventually give way to a passing play involving Francescoli and Ariel Ortega, which resulted in the forward rattling the crossbar. Following the finish, Juventus goalkeeper Angelo Peruzzi brought down Ortega inside the area, but the action went unnoticed by Brazilian referee Márcio Rezende de Freitas. Nine minutes from injury time, the Italian side found the opening goal after a Di Livio corner was headed by Zidane. The ball then fell to Del Piero, who unleashed a shot from the edge of the six-yard box to put his team ahead. River Plate attempted to launch two responses at an equaliser, but the efforts from Gancedo and Celso Ayala were unsuccessful. In between shots, they switched strikers by replacing Julio Cruz with Marcelo Salas. Although Juventus possessed counter-attacking chances, neither squad managed to score any further goals, and thus the match ended 1–0 to the Italian side.

=== Details ===
26 November 1996
19:10 JST

| Juventus (Italy) | 1–0 | (Argentina) River Plate |
|---|---|---|
| Del Piero 81' | Report |

National Stadium, Tokyo
Attendance: 48,305
Referee: Márcio Rezende de Freitas (Brazil)

| Juventus | River Plate |

| GK | 1 | (Italy) Angelo Peruzzi (c) |
| RB | 3 | (Italy) Moreno Torricelli | (yellow card) 82' |
| CB | 2 | (Italy) Ciro Ferrara |
| CB | 4 | (Uruguay) Paolo Montero | (yellow card) 51' |
| LB | 5 | (Italy) Sergio Porrini | (yellow card) 67' |
| DM | 14 | (France) Didier Deschamps |
| RM | 7 | (Italy) Angelo Di Livio |
| LM | 18 | (Federal Republic of Yugoslavia) Vladimir Jugović | (yellow card) 50' |
| AM | 21 | (France) Zinedine Zidane | (yellow card) 84' | (substituted off) 89' |
| CF | 9 | (Croatia) Alen Bokšić |
| CF | 10 | (Italy) Alessandro Del Piero |
Substitutes:
| GK | 12 | (Italy) Michelangelo Rampulla |
| DF | 13 | (Italy) Mark Iuliano |
| MF | 20 | (Italy) Alessio Tacchinardi | | (substituted on) 89' |
| MF | 19 | (Italy) Attilio Lombardo |
| MF | 26 | (Italy) Raffaele Ametrano |
| FW | 11 | (Italy) Michele Padovano |
| FW | 15 | (Italy) Christian Vieri |
Manager:
(Italy) Marcello Lippi

| GK | 1 | (Argentina) Roberto Bonano |
| RB | 4 | (Argentina) Hernán Díaz |
| CB | 2 | (Paraguay) Celso Ayala |
| CB | 6 | (Argentina) Eduardo Berizzo |
| LB | 3 | (Argentina) Juan Pablo Sorín |
| DM | 5 | (Argentina) Leonardo Astrada | (yellow card) 38' |
| RM | 8 | (Argentina) Roberto Monserrat |
| LM | 11 | (Argentina) Sergio Berti | | (substituted off) 74' |
| AM | 9 | (Uruguay) Enzo Francescoli (c) |
| CF | 10 | (Argentina) Ariel Ortega |
| CF | 7 | (Argentina) Julio Cruz | | (substituted off) 83' |
Substitutes:
| GK | 12 | (Argentina) Germán Burgos |
| DF | 13 | (Argentina) Guillermo Rivarola |
| MF | 18 | (Argentina) Leonel Gancedo | | (substituted on) 74' |
| MF | 19 | (Argentina) Marcelo Escudero |
| MF | 20 | (Argentina) Marcelo Gallardo |
| FW | 21 | (Argentina) Ramón Medina Bello |
| FW | 16 | (Chile) Marcelo Salas | | (substituted on) 83' |
Manager:
(Argentina) Ramón Díaz

Man of the Match:
(Italy) Alessandro Del Piero (Juventus)

== Post-match ==
Ramón Díaz was interviewed shortly after the defeat. When asked about his team's performance, the River Plate manager stated: "Our opponent is very prominent; they're a very tough team to play. Their pace is very rare to see in Argentine football". He then added: "We didn't play well at all in the first half, but we improved in the second and at our best moment they scored. There's nothing to reproach." Regarding their upcoming fixtures, Díaz commented: "The squad was left disappointed after being unable to show the level of football they've been displaying in the league. They'll channel that frustration into the [Torneo Apertura], which I'm sure we'll win."

Juventus reached the final of the 1996–97 UEFA Champions League, which they lost to Borussia Dortmund 3–1. They would win the 1996–97 Serie A, however, which qualified them to the 1997–98 edition of the tournament. River Plate followed a similar suit, as they were also unable to retain their continental title. Nevertheless, they were crowned champions of the 1996 Torneo Apertura, the first of the three consecutive league titles they would go on to win.

== See also ==
- 1995–96 UEFA Champions League
- 1996 Copa Libertadores
- Juventus F.C. in international football
