= Angelo Di Livio =

Italian former footballer (born 1966)

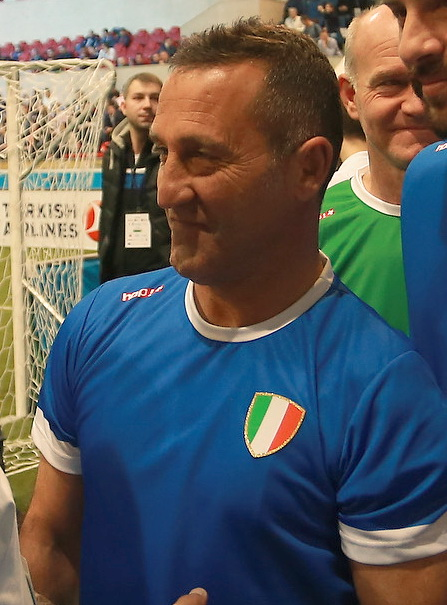
- Di Livio in Italy colours, 2018

Personal information
- Full name: Angelo Di Livio
- Date of birth: 26 July 1966 (age 60)
- Place of birth: Rome, Italy
- Height: 1.73 m (5 ft 8 in)
- Positions: Midfielder; wing-back

Senior career*
Years	Team	Apps	(Gls)
1984–1985	Roma	0	(0)
1985–1986	Reggiana	13	(0)
1986–1987	Nocerina	31	(1)
1987–1989	Perugia	72	(4)
1989–1993	Padova	138	(13)
1993–1999	Juventus	186	(3)
1999–2005	Fiorentina	169	(8)
Total		609	(29)

International career
1995–2002	Italy	40	(0)
Medal record
Representing Italy
Association football
UEFA European Championship
Silver medal – second place	2000
- * Club domestic league appearances and goals

Angelo Di Livio Cavaliere OMRI (Italian pronunciation: [ˈandʒelo di ˈliːvjo]; born 26 July 1966) is an Italian former professional footballer who played as a midfielder and wing-back. He represented several Italian clubs in Serie A throughout his career, coming to prominence with Juventus, where he won several domestic and international titles. At international level he also played for the Italy national side in two FIFA World Cups and two UEFA European Championships, reaching the final of UEFA Euro 2000.

During his playing career he was known as soldatino (toy soldier) or soldatino Di Livio, a nickname his Juventus teammate at the time Roberto Baggio gave him because of Di Livio's diminutive stature, posture, and characteristic way of running up and down the flank.

== Club career ==
Born in Rome, Di Livio began his career with Roma in 1984. Having failed to make an appearance in his only season for the club, Di Livio played for Reggiana (1985–86), Nocerina (1986–87), Perugia (1987–89), Padova (1989–93), Juventus (1993–99) and Fiorentina (1999–2005).

His tireless running and quality crossing made him an important element in the dominant Juventus starting lineup from 1993 to 1999, during one of the most successful periods in the club's history. With Juventus, he won three scudetti (Italian A League; 1995, 1997, 1998) and one Champions League title (1996), in addition to two Italian Supercups (1995, 1997), a Coppa Italia, an UEFA Supercup (1996), and an Intercontinental Cup (1996); he also reached the final of the 1994–95 UEFA Cup.

In 1999, he moved to Fiorentina, where he captained the team to win the Coppa Italia during the 2000–01 season. In 2002, when AC Fiorentina went bankrupt and was reborn as Florentia Viola in Serie C2, Di Livio showed his dedication by being the only player to stay with the team, as he played through the depths of Italian football on the climb back to Serie A in 2004, finally retiring after the conclusion of the 2004–05 Serie A season.

== International career ==
Di Livio was capped 40 times for Italy. He played for Italy at Euro 96, the 1998 FIFA World Cup, Euro 2000 (where Italy finished in 2nd place), and the 2002 FIFA World Cup. His first cap came on 6 September 1995 against Slovenia; his last on 18 June 2002 against South Korea. At Euro 1996, he set-up Pierluigi Casiraghi's first goal in the team's 2–1 win in the opening group match against Russia. For Italy, he was often used as a holding player to shut down games when the team was ahead, thus sealing the win.

== After retirement ==
After retiring, Di Livio worked as a coach in the AS Roma Youth System (Allievi "Coppa Lazio").

== Style of play ==
Di Livio, an experienced, reliable, and tactically versatile player, was usually deployed on the right wing. Comfortable on either flank as both a wide midfielder, or as a full-back or wing-back—thanks to his two-footedness, he could also operate centrally as a centre as a box-to-box or defensive midfielder, or even in defence. Although some observers viewed his flair as overstated, he stood out for his consistency, tactical intelligence, work rate, and stamina—traits that, alongside his tenacity, mentality, and professionalism, allowed him to get up and down the flank effectively despite his smaller stature. Strong man-marking, crossing accuracy, and tireless tracking back helped underpin a successful career.

== Personal life ==
Angelo's son, Lorenzo, is also a footballer; a Roma youth product, he currently plays for Latina. His daughter, Alessia, is an electronic music producer and DJ, performing under the name ADIEL.

== Endorsements ==
As one of the most popular footballers from his generation, Di Livio has kept his public influence and positive reputation till today. In 2011, Angelo Di Livio was named as "Brand ambassador" for SKS365's brand planetwin365.

== Career statistics ==
=== Club ===
Appearances and goals by club, season and competition
Club	Season	League			Coppa Italia		Europe		Total	
Club	Season	Division	Apps	Goals	Apps	Goals	Apps	Goals	Apps	Goals
Roma	1984–85	Serie A	0	0						
Reggiana	1985–86	Serie C1	13	0						
Nocerina	1986–87	Serie C1	31	1						
Perugia	1987–88	Serie C2	34	3						
Perugia	1988–89	Serie C1	33	1						
Perugia	1989–90	Serie C1	5	0						
Padova	1989–90	Serie B	29	2						
Padova	1990–91	Serie B	36	3						
Padova	1991–92	Serie B	36	3						
Padova	1992–93	Serie B	36	3						
Juventus	1993–94	Serie A	33	0						
Juventus	1994–95	Serie A	27	1						
Juventus	1995–96	Serie A	32	2						
Juventus	1996–97	Serie A	32	1						
Juventus	1997–98	Serie A	30	0						
Juventus	1998–99	Serie A	33	1						
Fiorentina	1999–00	Serie A	30	1						
Fiorentina	2000–01	Serie A	33	1						
Fiorentina	2001–02	Serie A	32	1						
Fiorentina	2002–03	Serie C2	21	0						
Fiorentina	2003–04	Serie B	43	4						
Fiorentina	2004–05	Serie A	12	0						
Total			609	29	53	2	67	1	740	32

=== International ===
Italy national team
Year	Apps	Goals
1995	2	0
1996	7	0
1997	10	0
1998	6	0
1999	2	0
2000	5	0
2001	5	0
2002	3	0
Total	40	0

== Honours ==
Juventus

- Serie A: 1994–95, 1996–97, 1997–98
- Coppa Italia: 1994–95
- Supercoppa Italiana: 1995, 1997
- UEFA Champions League: 1995–96
- UEFA Super Cup: 1996
- Intercontinental Cup: 1996

Fiorentina

- Coppa Italia: 2000–01
- Serie C2: 2002–03

Perugia

- Serie C2: 1987–88

Italy

- UEFA European Championship runner-up: 2000

Individual

- ACF Fiorentina Hall of Fame: 2023

Orders

- 5th Class / Knight: Cavaliere Ordine al Merito della Repubblica Italiana: 2000
