= 1995 Supercoppa Italiana =

- Event: Supercoppa Italiana
Juventus	Parma
Serie A	Coppa Italia
1	0
- Date: 17 January 1996
- Venue: Stadio delle Alpi, Turin, Italy
- Referee: Piero Ceccarini
- Attendance: 5,289

The 1995 Supercoppa Italiana was a match contested by Juventus, the 1994–95 Serie A winner, Parma, the 1994–95 Coppa Italia runner-up, since Juventus had won both trophies in the 1994–95 season. It was the second appearance for both teams, after Juventus was defeated by Napoli in 1990 and Parma lost against Milan in 1992.

The match was played in January 1996 because of scheduling conflicts.

== Match details ==
17 January 1996
20:30 CET

Juventus	1–0	Parma
Vialli 33'	(Report)

Stadio delle Alpi, Turin
Attendance: 5,289
Referee: Piero Ceccarini

Juventus	Parma

JUVENTUS:
GK	1	(Italy) Angelo Peruzzi	(red card) 39'
RB	2	(Italy) Ciro Ferrara	Booked
CB	20	(Italy) Pietro Vierchowod
CB	15	(Italy) Alessio Tacchinardi
LB	3	(Italy) Moreno Torricelli
CM	8	(Italy) Antonio Conte
CM	6	(Portugal) Paulo Sousa		(substituted off) 83'
CM	14	(France) Didier Deschamps
CF	9	(Italy) Gianluca Vialli (c)		(substituted off) 78'
CF	11	(Italy) Fabrizio Ravanelli
CF	10	(Italy) Alessandro Del Piero		(substituted off) 40'
Substitutes:
GK	12	(Italy) Michelangelo Rampulla			(substituted in) 40'
DF	4	(Italy) Massimo Carrera			(substituted in) 83'
MF	7	(Italy) Angelo Di Livio			(substituted in) 78'
Manager:
(Italy) Marcello Lippi

PARMA:
GK	1	(Italy) Luca Bucci
RB	14	(Italy) Roberto Mussi		(substituted off) 77'
CB	6	(Portugal) Fernando Couto	Booked
CB	7	(Argentina) Nestor Sensini
CB	17	(Italy) Fabio Cannavaro	Booked
LB	3	(Italy) Alberto Di Chiara		(substituted off) 46'
CM	23	(Italy) Massimo Brambilla
CM	24	(Italy) Dino Baggio
CM	9	(Italy) Massimo Crippa		(substituted off) 83'
SS	10	(Italy) Gianfranco Zola (c)
CF	8	(Bulgaria) Hristo Stoichkov
Substitutes:
DF	2	(Italy) Antonio Benarrivo		(substituted in) 83'
FW	18	(Colombia) Faustino Asprilla		(substituted in) 77'
FW	20	(Italy) Alessandro Melli		(substituted in) 46'
Manager:
(Italy) Nevio Scala

MATCH OFFICIALS

- Assistant referees:
- Fourth official:

MATCH RULES

- 90 minutes.
- 30 minutes of extra-time if necessary.
- Penalty shoot-out if scores still level.
- Seven named substitutes
- Maximum of 3 substitutions.

== See also ==
- 1995–96 Juventus FC season
- 1995–96 Parma AC season
- 2002 Supercoppa Italiana - played between same teams
