= Angelo Peruzzi =

Italian footballer (born 1970)

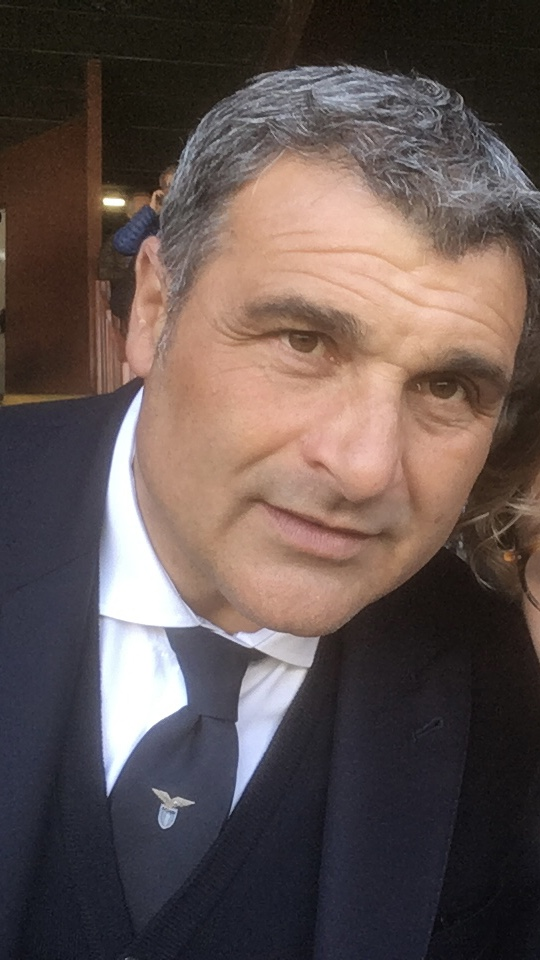
- Peruzzi in 2010

Personal information
- Full name: Angelo Peruzzi
- Date of birth: 16 February 1970 (age 56)
- Place of birth: Blera, Viterbo, Italy
- Height: 1.80 m (5 ft 11 in)
- Position: Goalkeeper

Senior career*
Years	Team	Apps	(Gls)
1987–1991	Roma	16	(0)
1989–1990	→ Hellas Verona (loan)	29	(0)
1991–1999	Juventus	208	(0)
1999–2000	Inter Milan	33	(0)
2000–2007	Lazio	192	(0)
Total		478	(0)

International career
1989–1992	Italy U21	10	(0)
1995–2006	Italy	31	(0)
Medal record
Men's football
Representing Italy
FIFA World Cup
Winner	2006 Germany
- * Club domestic league appearances and goals

Angelo Peruzzi Ufficiale OMRI (Italian pronunciation: [ˈandʒelo peˈruttsi]; born 16 February 1970) is an Italian football coach and former goalkeeper, and a three-time winner of the Serie A Goalkeeper of the Year award.

Peruzzi is regarded by pundits as one of the greatest Italian goalkeepers of all time, and as one of the best goalkeepers of his generation. Throughout his career, he played for Italian clubs Roma, Hellas Verona, Juventus, Internazionale and Lazio. He had a highly successful spell with Juventus, where he won three Serie A titles, the Coppa Italia, the UEFA Cup and the UEFA Champions League, among other titles; he won a second Coppa Italia with Lazio before retiring with the club in 2007. At international level, he played 31 times for the Italy national team from his debut in 1995, and was a member of their squad which won the 2006 FIFA World Cup. He also represented them at the 1992 Olympics, at UEFA Euro 1996 (as a starting goalkeeper), and at Euro 2004.

== Club career ==
Peruzzi began his Serie A career with Roma in 1987. He was loaned to Hellas Verona in 1989, but was one of the two Roma players (the other being Andrea Carnevale) to be suspended for a year in October 1990 after failing a doping test because of an appetite suppressant he was taking at the time, which contained the banned substance Phentermine.

His signing with Juventus in 1991 successfully revived his career and he soon surpassed Stefano Tacconi as the club's starting goalkeeper, remaining with the team until 1999, and winning the Serie A Goalkeeper of the Year Award in 1997 and 1998, as well as the Guerin d'oro in 1997. Peruzzi won three Serie A titles, a Coppa Italia, two Supercoppa Italiana titles, a UEFA Cup, a UEFA Super Cup, an Intercontinental Cup and was part of Juventus' 1996 UEFA Champions League title squad that defeated Ajax in the final on penalties, saving two in the final shoot-out. He also reached two more consecutive Champions League finals with the Turin-based club, as well as a semi-final finish during his final season with the club. Peruzzi also won a runners-up medal in the 1995 UEFA Cup final and in the 1992 Coppa Italia final, and was voted to the ESM Team of the Year during the 1996–97 and the 1997–98 seasons. Over this period, several Italian pundits began to consider him the best goalkeeper in the world, due to his consistency.

Following the departure of Gianluca Pagliuca, Peruzzi's perceived career rival in his position, from Internazionale to Bologna in 1999, Peruzzi left Juventus for Inter in 1999 on a 28 billion lire (€14.461 million) transfer fee, and a reported 8 billion lire pre-tax wage. Peruzzi spent one unsuccessful season with the club – despite his excellent performances – under his former Juventus manager Marcello Lippi, finishing the league season in fourth place, and reaching the Coppa Italia final.

The following season, he transferred to Lazio for 40 billion lire (€20.658 million; in a cash plus Marco Ballotta deal), and made over 200 appearances in Serie A and European competitions with the club, winning the Supercoppa Italiana in 2000 and the Coppa Italia in 2004. He kept playing at a very high level, being generally considered the best Italian goalkeeper behind Gianluigi Buffon.

Although his contract with the Biancocelesti ran until 2008, Peruzzi retired at the end of the 2006–07 season: after the 0–0 draw with Roma 29 April 2007, Peruzzi stated that he had played his last match due to the frustration of nagging injuries. However, he was put on in the final few minutes in Lazio's final home match of the season, a goalless draw against Parma on 20 May, as a goodbye to the fans. He was named the Serie A Goalkeeper of the Year for the third time in his career on 28 January 2008.

== International career ==
Peruzzi was capped 31 times in 11 years with Italy at senior level, between 1995 and 2005. At youth level, he was a member of the Italy under-21 side that took part at the 1990 and 1992 under-21 European championships, winning the latter edition of the tournament; he was also a member of the national squad that competed at the 1992 Summer Olympics in Barcelona, making two appearances during the tournament. Peruzzi made his senior debut under manager Arrigo Sacchi, in a 4–1 home win over Estonia, in an UEFA Euro 1996 qualifying match, on 25 March 1995, and he was named Italy's starting goalkeeper at Euro 1996, although Italy suffered a group-stage elimination. He was scheduled to be the starter at the 1998 FIFA World Cup under Cesare Maldini, but suffered a late injury and was replaced in the starting line-up by Gianluca Pagliuca.

After the 1998 World Cup, Maldini was replaced by Italy's former goalkeeper and record-setter Dino Zoff, who confirmed Peruzzi as first-choice goalkeeper during his first year as Italy's coach: nonetheless, after a match against Norway in 1999, Gianluigi Buffon was given the starting spot, while Francesco Toldo became his first substitute. Being overtaken by two colleagues, Peruzzi chose not to participate in the Euro 2000 as the third goalkeeper, a decision that, in Zoff's words, prevented him from potentially recovering his first-choice status: because of the last-minute injury that excluded Buffon from the tournament, Peruzzi could have been the starter instead of Toldo, had he accepted the call.

Peruzzi did not play for Italy again until making a substitute appearance in a friendly against Spain on 28 April 2004, and was subsequently called up by Giovanni Trapattoni as a backup keeper at Euro 2004: Trapattoni's choice appeared unusual, since Italy's third-choice goalkeeper for World Cups and European Championships was generally selected among young, promising ones; instead, the contemporary presence of two veteran keepers such as Peruzzi and Toldo raised doubts about their actual role behind Buffon, because neither of them would have easily accepted to play a marginal part.

In August 2005, he was the starter in two away World Cup qualifiers against Scotland (1–1) and Belarus (4–1), while Buffon was shelved with a shoulder injury; Peruzzi then served as second goalkeeper (behind Buffon) in the 2006 World Cup under Marcello Lippi, as Italy won the tournament for the fourth time. Even though he did not take the field, teammate Daniele De Rossi highlighted Peruzzi's important role in the squad as a key dressing room personality, due to his leadership and experience. Peruzzi retired from international football after the tournament. His final international appearance came in a 1–0 home win in a 2006 World Cup qualifier against Slovenia, in Palermo, on 8 October 2005, which sealed Italy's place at the upcoming World Cup.

== Style of play ==
A powerful, athletic, complete, and consistent goalkeeper – although injury-prone –, Peruzzi was renowned for his physical strength, positioning, explosive reactions, speed, and agility, in spite of his sturdy physique; he particularly excelled at quickly rushing off his line to parry or collect the ball on the ground, as well as at anticipating his opponents outside the penalty area, which made him particularly effective in teams which relied on a zonal marking defensive system with high defensive lines. Due to his modest height for a goalkeeper 1.80 m, according to some sources 1.78 m, he was less effective at coming out to collect crosses, and preferred to punch the ball out rather than trying to catch it, although his handling was generally reliable. While he was extremely gifted both technically and acrobatics-wise, he was an efficient goalkeeper, who performed spectacular dives only in case of strict necessity: he indeed believed that "a great keeper must walk across the line: this way he disheartens the opposing strikers, because he seems to save shots effortlessly". Throughout his career, he also stood out for his concentration, and for his ability to produce decisive saves even after not having been called into action for long periods of time during a match; he was also effective at stopping penalties, while he was not particularly skilled with the ball at his feet, and usually preferred to clear the ball away whenever it was passed back to him.

A precocious talent in his youth, he was regarded as one of the best goalkeepers in the world in his prime during the 1990s, but also stood out for his longevity in his later career, which enabled him to maintain a consistently high level of performances. Although he was known for his personality, leadership from the back, strong mentality, and the confidence he inspired in his teammates throughout his career, he had quite a kind, calm and reserved character off the pitch, which, although made him very popular with his teammates, led some pundits to accuse him of not being as effective at directing his back-line.

Because of his stocky physique, Peruzzi was given the nicknames "Tyson" in reference to the boxer Mike Tyson's similarly powerful build, and "The Boar" ("Cinghialone," in Italian).

== Coaching career ==
After his retirement, Peruzzi worked in the Italy national team staff as one of Marcello Lippi's collaborators. He was then appointed Ciro Ferrara's assistant on the Italy under-21 team and in 2012 followed him in joining Sampdoria in Serie A.

== Career statistics ==
=== Club ===
Appearances and goals by club, season and competition
Club	Season	League			Coppa Italia		Europe		Other		Total	
Club	Season	Division	Apps	Goals	Apps	Goals	Apps	Goals	Apps	Goals	Apps	Goals
Roma	1987–88	Serie A	1	0	0	0	—		—		1	0
Roma	1988–89	Serie A	12	0	7	0	1	0	—		20	0
Roma	1990–91	Serie A	3	0	0	0	2	0	—		5	0
Roma	Total		16	0	7	0	3	0	—		26	0
Hellas Verona (loan)	1989–90	Serie A	29	0	1	0	—		—		30	0
Juventus	1991–92	Serie A	6	0	6	0	—		—		12	0
Juventus	1992–93	Serie A	29	0	6	0	10	0	—		45	0
Juventus	1993–94	Serie A	32	0	1	0	6	0	—		39	0
Juventus	1994–95	Serie A	26	0	8	0	9	0	—		43	0
Juventus	1995–96	Serie A	30	0	0	0	10	0	2	0	42	0
Juventus	1996–97	Serie A	29	0	2	0	9	0	—		40	0
Juventus	1997–98	Serie A	31	0	1	0	11	0	1	0	43	0
Juventus	1998–99	Serie A	25	0	0	0	8	0	1	0	34	0
Juventus	Total		208	0	24	0	63	0	4	0	299	0
Internazionale	1999–00	Serie A	33	0	4	0	1^{1}	0	—		38	0
Lazio	2000–01	Serie A	29	0	0	0	7	0	1	0	37	0
Lazio	2001–02	Serie A	27	0	2	0	8	0	—		37	0
Lazio	2002–03	Serie A	30	0	0	0	6	0	—		36	0
Lazio	2003–04	Serie A	27	0	0	0	7	0	—		34	0
Lazio	2004–05	Serie A	21	0	1	0	1	0	1	0	24	0
Lazio	2005–06	Serie A	30	0	0	0	0	0	—		30	0
Lazio	2006–07	Serie A	28	0	0	0	0	0	—		28	0
Lazio	Total		192	0	3	0	29	0	2	0	226	0
Career total			478	0	39	0	96	0	6	0	619	0

- ^{1} Including 1 match in season 1999-00 UEFA Champions League qualification.

=== International ===
Appearances and goals by national team and year
National team	Year	Apps	Goals
Italy	1995	5	0
Italy	1996	6	0
Italy	1997	9	0
Italy	1998	5	0
Italy	1999	1	0
Italy	2000	1	0
Italy	2004	1	0
Italy	2005	4	0
Italy	2006	3	0
Total		35	0

== Honours ==
Juventus

- Serie A: 1994–95, 1996–97, 1997–98
- Coppa Italia: 1994–95
- Supercoppa Italiana: 1995, 1997
- UEFA Champions League: 1995–96
- UEFA Cup: 1992–93
- UEFA Super Cup: 1996
- Intercontinental Cup: 1996

Lazio

- Coppa Italia: 2003–04
- Supercoppa Italiana: 2000

Italy

- FIFA World Cup: 2006

Individual

- Guerin d'Oro: 1997
- ESM Team of the Year: 1996–97, 1997–98
- Serie A Goalkeeper of the Year: 1997, 1998, 2007

Orders

- 4th Class / Officer: Ufficiale Ordine al Merito della Repubblica Italiana: 2006

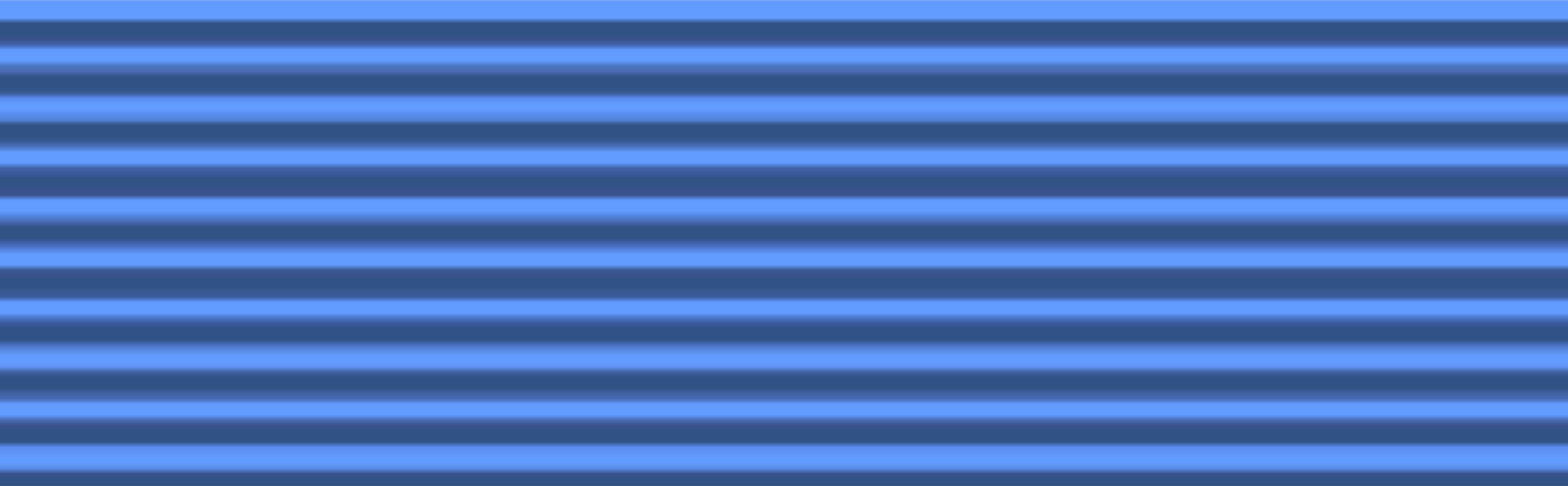
- CONI: Golden Collar of Sports Merit: 2006
