= Massimo Carrera =

Italian footballer and manager (born 1964)

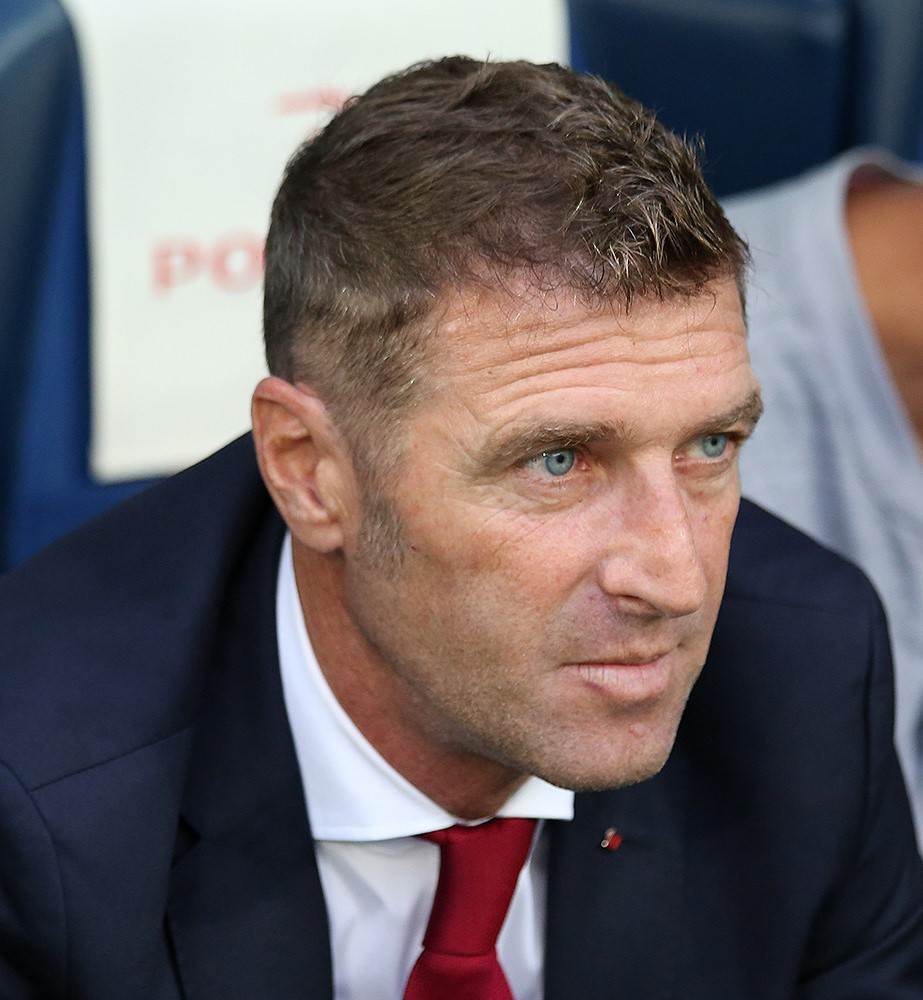
- Carrera as Spartak Moscow manager in 2018

Personal information
- Date of birth: 22 April 1964 (age 62)
- Place of birth: Pozzuolo Martesana, Italy
- Height: 1.81 m (5 ft 11 in)
- Position: Defender

Youth career
- Pro Sesto

Senior career*
Years	Team	Apps	(Gls)
1982–1983	Pro Sesto	30	(4)
1983–1984	Russi	28	(5)
1984–1985	Alessandria	31	(0)
1985–1986	Pescara	19	(1)
1986–1991	Bari	156	(4)
1991–1996	Juventus	114	(1)
1996–2003	Atalanta	207	(3)
2003–2004	Napoli	26	(0)
2004–2005	Treviso	12	(0)
2005–2008	Pro Vercelli	63	(1)
Total		686	(19)

International career
1992	Italy	1	(0)

Managerial career
- 2009–2012: Juventus (youth)
- 2012: Juventus (caretaker)
- 2012–2014: Juventus (assistant)
- 2014–2016: Italy (assistant)
- 2016: Spartak Moscow (assistant)
- 2016–2018: Spartak Moscow
- 2019–2020: AEK Athens
- 2021: Bari
- 2024: Ascoli
- * Club domestic league appearances and goals

Massimo Carrera (Italian pronunciation: [ˈmassimo karˈrɛːra]; born 22 April 1964) is an Italian professional football manager and former player. Nicknamed La Bandera, he played as a defender for various clubs, including Juventus, which he later managed, and the Italy national team.

== Club career ==
Carrera began his career at Pro Sesto, but rose to fame with Bari, enjoying five seasons with the club before moving to Juventus in 1991. Under manager Giovanni Trapattoni, he was deployed at right back, a role he had also held at Bari. He disputed an excellent first season, culminating with being called up for the Italy national team. In his second season, he won the UEFA Cup with the club.

Carrera unwittingly played a huge role in helping Milan go unbeaten in the 1991–92 Serie A season. During injury time of Juventus' home match against Milan on 15 September 1991, an innocent-looking cross from the right touchline hit Carrera's head, and the ball looped past a stranded Stefano Tacconi for the crucial equaliser. Milan would then go on to finish the season unbeaten, and embark on a record-breaking 58-match unbeaten streak.

In 1994, with the arrival of Marcello Lippi, he was deployed as a sweeper, in place of Luca Fusi, and subsequently as a central defender, becoming a pillar of the team, and winning both Serie A and the Coppa Italia in 1995. Carrera also reached the UEFA Cup final at the end of the season.

Due to the arrival of skilled defenders Pietro Vierchowod and Paolo Montero the following season, Carrera started more often from the bench, but still offered valued contribution when called upon.

After 166 caps with Juventus, and having won Serie A, the Coppa Italia, the Supercoppa Italiana, the UEFA Champions League and the UEFA Cup, he transferred to Atalanta in the summer of 1996.

Carrera quickly became captain and leader of the Orobici, playing there for eight seasons and totaling 207 caps and three goals. He left Bergamo in 2003 to join Napoli, and the following season, he settled in Treviso.

He stayed in Veneto for just a season, and on 28 October 2005, at the age of 41, Carrera signed for Pro Vercelli.

At the end of the 2007–08 season, at the age of 44, Carrera decided to retire from playing football to focus on coaching.

== International career ==
Carrera's excellent performances with Juventus in his first year with the club earned him his first international call-up under manager Arrigo Sacchi in 1991; Carrera later made his debut and only appearance with the Italy national team on 19 February 1992, in a 4–0 friendly win against San Marino at the Stadio Dino Manuzzi in Cesena.

== Managerial career ==
=== Juventus ===
Carrera was reunited with former Juventus teammates Antonio Conte and Angelo Alessio in the summer of 2011 when he joined the club's coaching staff as a technical director.

Due to a ten-month ban against head coach Conte for alleged implications of his failure to report match fixing and a similar ban against his assistant Alessio, Carrera became Juventus' caretaker manager in July 2012. In his first official match, he claimed the 2012 Supercoppa Italiana defeating Napoli in Beijing, winning 4–2 after extra time. After Alessio's ban was removed, Carrera returned to the position of technical director, leaving the bench to Alessio.

=== Spartak Moscow ===
Before the 2016–17 season, Carrera was hired as an assistant manager for the Russian side FC Spartak Moscow. When the previous manager Dmitri Alenichev left the club on 5 August 2016 after Spartak's elimination from the UEFA Europa League by AEK Larnaca, Carrera was appointed the caretaker manager. On 17 August 2016, he was hired as Spartak's manager permanently, making his debut on 21 August against Krasnodar, where red-white captured their first victory 2–0. No other Spartak head coach managed to start their work as successfully as Carrera did: Spartak collected 28 of 36 points in the first twelve matches under him. On 7 May 2017, Spartak secured their first Russian Premier League title since 2001 under Carrera's leadership. On 6 June 2017, he extended his Spartak contract to 31 May 2019.

He was relieved of his duties in late 2018 following a number of poor performances despite remaining seemingly popular among the fans, a move that caused controversy. In particular, many accused captain Denis Glushakov of actively supporting the decision and called for his removal from the team.

=== AEK Athens ===
On 8 December 2019, Carrera was unveiled as the new manager of Super League Greece club AEK Athens.

Massimo Carrera succeed to bring AEK Athens to qualify for the UEFA Europa League in the season 2020–21 after beating VfL Wolfsburg at the Play-off round for 2–1 at the Athens Olympic Stadium getting in the Group stage.

=== Bari ===
On 9 February 2021, Carrera was hired as new head coach of Serie C club Bari. He was dismissed just two months later, on 19 April 2021, following a last-minute home draw against Palermo, leaving Bari in third place with two games to go.

=== Ascoli ===
On 12 March 2024, Carrera was appointed new head coach of Ascoli, replacing Fabrizio Castori. Despite suffering relegation to Serie C, Carrera was confirmed in charge of Ascoli but was ultimately removed from his coaching duties on 27 September 2024 following a negative start to the new season.

== Managerial statistics ==
As of match played 13 April 2024

Managerial record by team and tenure
Team		From	To	Record								Ref.
Team		From	To	P	W	D	L	GF	GA	GD	Win %	Ref.
Juventus	(Italy)	1 July 2012	19 October 2012	10	7	3	0	24	9	+15	70.00	
Spartak Moscow	(Russia)	5 August 2016	22 October 2018	89	49	20	20	136	100	+36	55.06	
AEK Athens	(Greece)	8 December 2019	22 December 2020	50	27	12	11	81	50	+31	54.00	
Bari	(Italy)	9 February 2021	19 April 2021	15	8	4	3	28	8	+20	53.33	
Ascoli	(Italy)	12 March 2024	present	4	1	2	1	5	3	+2	25.00	
Total				168	92	41	35	274	170	+104	54.76	—

== Honours ==
=== Player ===
Bari

- Serie B: 1988–89
- Mitropa Cup: 1990

Juventus

- Serie A: 1994–95
- Coppa Italia: 1994–95
- Supercoppa Italiana: 1995
- UEFA Champions League: 1995–96
- UEFA Cup: 1992–93

=== Manager ===
Juventus

- Serie A: 2012–13
- Supercoppa Italiana: 2012

Spartak Moscow

- Russian Premier League: 2016–17
- Russian Super Cup: 2017

AEK Athens

- Greek Cup runner-up: 2019–20

Individual

- Russian Premier League Coach of the Year: 2016–17
