= Moreno Torricelli =

Italian footballer and manager

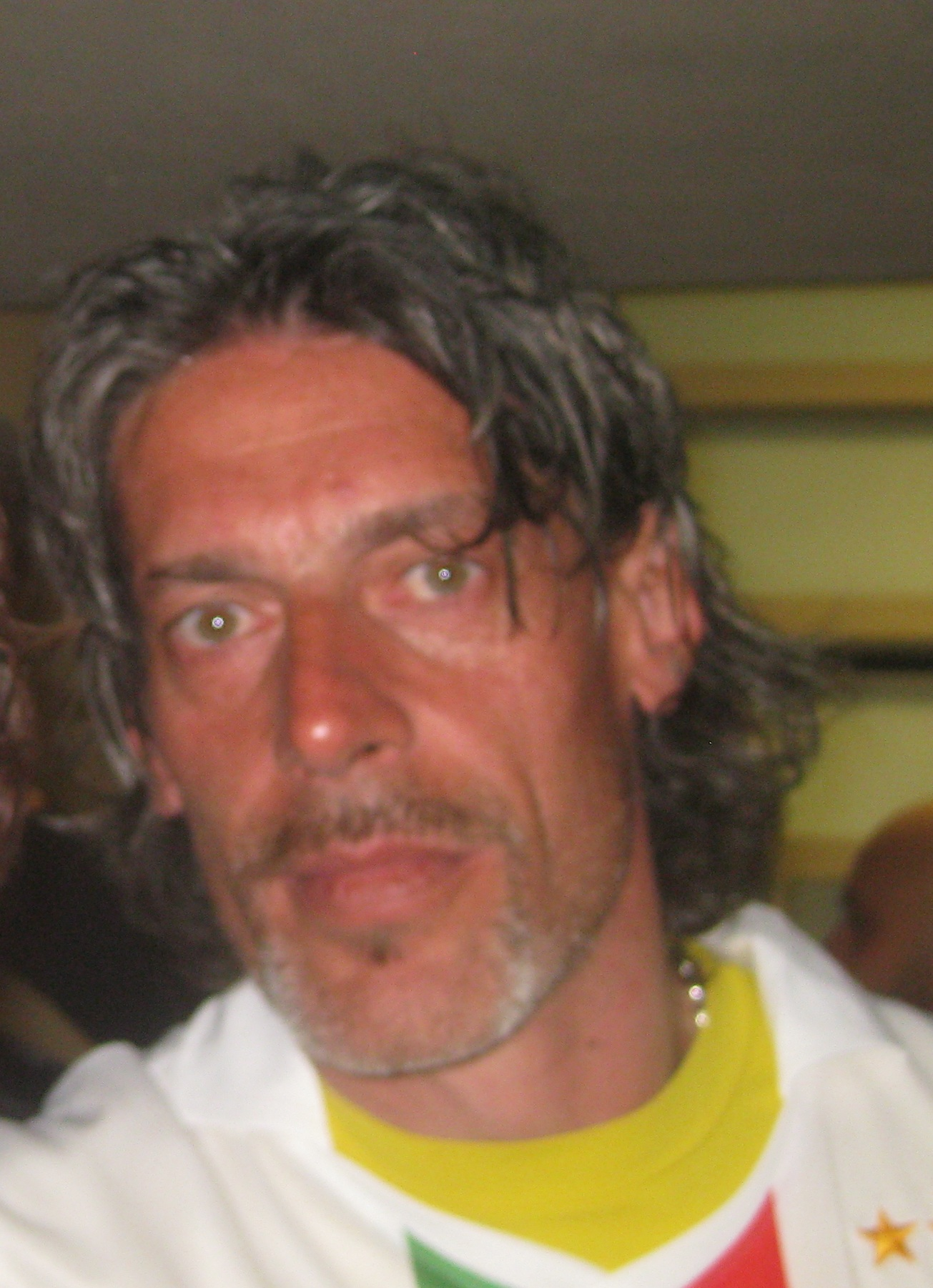
- Torricelli in March 2011

Personal information
- Date of birth: 23 January 1970 (age 56)
- Place of birth: Erba, Italy
- Height: 1.84 m (6 ft 0 in)
- Position: Right-back

Senior career*
| Years | Team | Apps | (Gls) |
| 1990–1992 | Caratese | 57 | (3) |
| 1992–1998 | Juventus | 152 | (1) |
| 1998–2002 | Fiorentina | 99 | (2) |
| 2003–2004 | Espanyol | 33 | (0) |
| 2004–2005 | Arezzo | 25 | (1) |
| Total | | 366 | (7) |

International career
| 1996–1999 | Italy | 10 | (0) |

Managerial career
- 2009: Pistoiese
- 2009–2010: Figline
- * Club domestic league appearances and goals

Moreno Torricelli (Italian pronunciation: [moˈrɛːno torriˈtʃɛlli]; born 23 January 1970) is an Italian football manager and former defender, who usually played as a full-back on the right flank. Torricelli played for several Italian clubs throughout his career, but achieved prominence during his successful stint with Juventus, with whom he won several titles; he also had a spell in Spain with Espanyol. At the international level, he also represented the Italy national side, taking part in UEFA Euro 1996 and the 1998 FIFA World Cup.

== Club career ==
Torricelli, born in Erba in the Province of Como, was one of three children, with a twin brother, Paulo, and a sister, Ariann. He started playing football when he was around eight in the town he was living in, Verano Brianza in the Province of Milan. At age 13, he was asked by Como to attend a youth regional championship (Allievi Regionali) with them but at the end of the loan he had to get back to his former amateur team US Folgore of Verano Brianza before transferring again to Oggiono, newly promoted to the top regional league "Promozione" at the end of the 1987–88 season. In the "Promozione", Moreno played 49 matches in two seasons.

Upon joining Caratese from Oggiono in 1990 he was granted work in a factory and played football on a part-time basis because Caratese was a high-level team attending the top national amateur league "Interregionale".

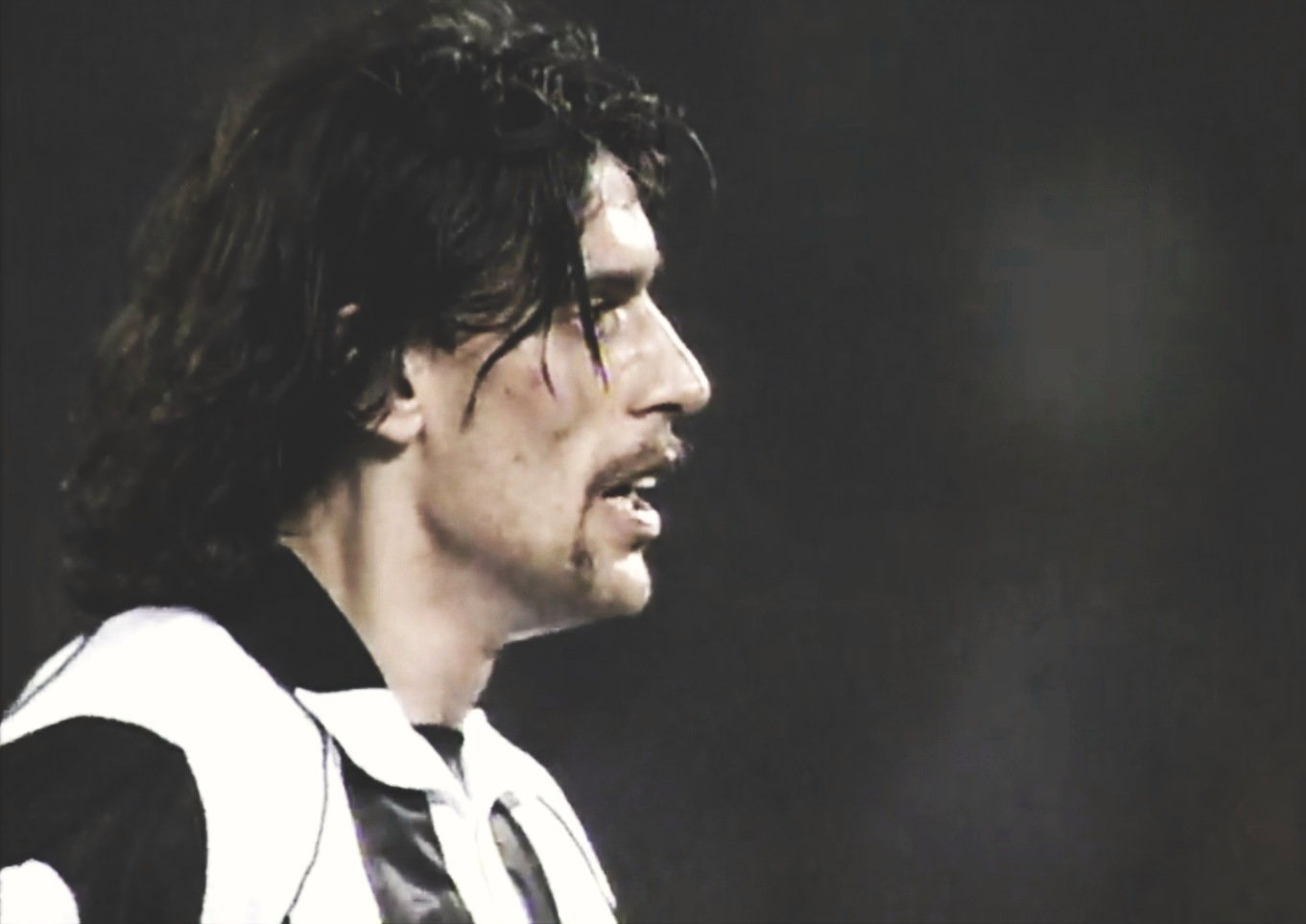
Torricelli with Juventus in 1998.

In July 1992, Caratese played against Serie A giants Juventus in a pre-season friendly. Torricelli's performance in this match impressed then-Juventus coach Giovanni Trapattoni so much that he was purchased by the Turin side for a 50 million lire shortly afterwards. Due to his past as a carpenter, his Juventus teammate Roberto Baggio gave Torricelli the nickname Geppetto during his time with the club.

Torricelli made his debut in Serie A on 13 September 1992 in a 4–1 win for Juventus against Atalanta. He quickly became a permanent starter in his first season and went on to play in the UEFA Cup-winning side that beat Borussia Dortmund in 1993. A player with a lot of heart and determination, despite his lack of skill, he was able to feature prominently in one of the best back-lines in Europe, and was capable of commanding all the roles in the Juventus defence, although his preferred position was at right-back. During his time at Juventus, the Turin club was one of the best teams in the world, and, in addition to the UEFA Cup, he won three Serie A titles, two Italian Supercups, a Coppa Italia, a UEFA Champions League, a UEFA Super Cup, and an Intercontinental Cup, in addition to reaching three consecutive Champions League finals between 1996 and 1998, and another UEFA Cup final in 1995.

In 1998, Torricelli left Juventus to join Fiorentina where he joined his former Juventus coach Trapattoni. He played in Florence for another four seasons, helping the club to win the 2000–01 Coppa Italia. He moved to Spain's Espanyol in January 2003 after Fiorentina's relegation and financial troubles led to them releasing nearly all their players. He retired in 2005 after a final season with Arezzo.

== International career ==
At international level, Torricelli won ten caps for the Italy national team between 1996 and 1998. He was a member of the Italian squad at Euro 96 under Arrigo Sacchi, where Italy suffered a surprising elimination in the group stage. Under manager Cesare Maldini, he was also a member of the Italian side at the 1998 World Cup, where Italy were eliminated on penalties by hosts and eventual Champions France in the quarter-finals, but he did not feature throughout the tournament.

== Style of play ==
A right-footed defender, Torricelli usually played as a full-back on the right flank, although he was a versatile player who was also capable of playing on the left, as well as in any other defensive role in a zonal marking system. In his youth, he had played as a sweeper in a man marking back-line. Despite his lack of notable skills, class, or technical ability with his feet, he was a hard-working, tenacious, combative, reliable and determined team-player, who was both energetic and tactically intelligent; he also possessed significant physical strength, good elevation, and a strong mentality. These attributes played a key role in his success as a footballer.

== Managerial career ==
In February 2009, Torricelli took his first managing role in football after being appointed as head coach of Tuscan Lega Pro Prima Divisione side Pistoiese. He took the team to the bottom of the league, and managed to guide it up to 16th place, being however defeated by Foligno in the relegation playoffs.

On 23 June 2009, he was announced as the new head coach of Figline for the 2009–10 Lega Pro Prima Divisione campaign, the first in the Italian third tier for the small Tuscan club.He left the club at the end of the season.

In the summer of 2014, he was hired by Pont-Donnas/Hône-Arnad in Aosta as a youth coach.

== Personal life ==
Torricelli was married to Barbara, who died from leukemia on 27 October 2010. Together they had three children, Arianna, Alessio and Aurora.

== Honours ==
Juventus

- Serie A: 1994–95, 1996–97, 1997–98
- Coppa Italia: 1994–95
- Supercoppa Italiana: 1995, 1997
- Intercontinental Cup: 1996
- UEFA Champions League: 1995–96
- UEFA Champions League: Runner-up: 1996–97, 1997–98
- UEFA Cup: 1992–93
- UEFA Cup: Runner-up: 1994–95
- UEFA Super Cup: 1996

Fiorentina

- Coppa Italia: 2000–01
