= 1994–95 Coppa Italia =

Tournament details
- Country: Italy
- Dates: 21 Aug 1994 – 11 June 1995
- Teams: 48

Final positions
- Champions: Juventus (9th title)
- Runners-up: Parma

Tournament statistics
- Matches played: 78
- Goals scored: 203 (2.6 per match)
- Top goal scorer(s): Fabrizio Ravanelli; Marco Branca (6 goals)

The 1994–95 Coppa Italia was the 48th edition of the tournament. The final was contested between Juventus and Parma, who also met in the previous month in the 1995 UEFA Cup Final. Juventus won 3–0 on aggregate.

== First round ==
Home team	Score	Away team
Ravenna (3)	1–2	Palermo (2)
Lodigiani (3)	0–3	Internazionale (1)
Monza (3)	2–1 (aet)	Venezia (2)
Como (3)	1–0	Ascoli (2)
Bologna (3)	0–1	Atalanta (2)
Perugia (2)	2–0	Chievo (2)
Juve Stabia (3)	0–1	Udinese (2)
Acireale (2)	2–3	Vicenza (2)
Modena (3)	3–2	Cosenza (2)
SPAL (3)	0–1	Piacenza (2)
Salernitana (2)	0–1	Fidelis Andria (2)
Reggina (3)	2–2 (p: 2-4)	Lecce (2)
Pescara (2)	0–1	Cesena (2)
Fiorenzuola (3)	3–2 (aet)	Ancona (2)
Pro Sesto (3)	0–2	Reggiana (1)
Chievo (2)	1–1 (p: 4-3)	Lucchese (2)

p=after penalty shoot-out

== Second round ==
Team 1	Agg.	Team 2	1st leg	2nd leg
Milan (1)	1–1 (p:4-2)	Palermo (2)	0–1	1–0
Padova (1)	1–3	Internazionale (1)	0–3	1–0
Monza (3)	2–5	Torino (1)	0–1	2–4
Como (2)	0–7	Foggia (1)	0–2	0–5
Cagliari (1)	(a) 2–2	Atalanta (2)	1–0	1–2
Parma (1)	4–1	Perugia (2)	4–0	0–1
Udinese (2)	2–4	Fiorentina (1)	2–2	0–2
Sampdoria (1)	6–3	Vicenza (2)	5–1	1–2
Lazio (1)	9–1	Modena (3)	5–0	4–1
Bari (1)	1–2	Piacenza (1)	0–1	1–1
Napoli (1)	4–3	Fidelis Andria (2)	3–2	1–1
Cremonese (1)	(a) 3–3	Lecce (2)	1–1	2–2
Cesena (2)	0–3	Genoa (1)	0–1	0–2
Fiorenzuola (3)	1–5	Roma (1)	0–3	1–2
Reggiana (1)	3–0	Brescia (1)	1–0	2–0
Juventus (1)	3–1	Chievo (2)	0–0	3–1

p=after penalty shoot-out

== Third round ==
Team 1	Agg.	Team 2	1st leg	2nd leg
Milan (1)	2–4	Internazionale (1)	1–2	1–2
Foggia (1)	4–2	Torino (1)	3–0	1–2
Parma (1)	3–1	Cagliari (1)	2–0	1–1
Fiorentina (1)	3–2	Sampdoria (1)	2–1	1–1
Lazio (1)	6–4	Piacenza (1)	3–2	3–2
Napoli (1)	4–0	Cremonese (1)	3–0	1–0
Genoa (1)	2–3	Roma (1)	2–0	0–3
Juventus (1)	3–2	Reggiana (1)	2–0	1–2

== Quarter-finals ==
Team 1	Agg.	Team 2	1st leg	2nd leg
Internazionale (1)	1–2	Foggia (1)	1–0	0–2 (aet) (1)
Parma (1)	4–1	Fiorentina (1)	2–0	2–1
Lazio (1)	3–1	Napoli (1)	1–0	2–1
Juventus (1)	4–3	Roma (1)	3–0	1–3

== Semi-finals ==
Team 1	Agg.	Team 2	1st leg	2nd leg
Lazio	1–3	Juventus	0–1	1–2
Foggia	2–4	Parma	1–1	1–3

== Final ==
=== First leg ===
7 June 1995
21:00

Juventus	1–0	Parma
Porrini 10'

Stadio delle Alpi, Turin
Attendance: 33,840
Referee: Angelo Amendolia

=== Second leg ===
11 June 1995
21:00

Parma	0–2	Juventus
		Porrini 26'; Ravanelli 54'

Stadio Ennio Tardini, Parma
Attendance: 23,823
Referee: Pierluigi Collina

Juventus won 3–0 on aggregate.

== Top goalscorers ==
Rank	Player	Club	Goals
1	(Italy) Fabrizio Ravanelli	Juventus	6
1	(Italy) Marco Branca	Parma	6
3	(Italy) Gianfranco Zola	Parma	4
3	(Italy) Giuseppe Signori	Lazio	4
3	(Italy) Pierpaolo Bresciani	Foggia	4
6	(Italy) Paolo Negro	Lazio	3
6	(Italy) Pierluigi Casiraghi	Lazio	3
6	(Italy) Giampaolo Ceramicola	Lecce	3
6	(Italy) Benito Carbone	Napoli	3
6	(Italy) Gianluca Vialli	Juventus	3
6	(Uruguay) Rubén Sosa	Internazionale	3
6	(Italy) Francesco Totti	Roma	3
