= 2005 Supercoppa Italiana =

- Event: Supercoppa Italiana
Juventus	Inter Milan
Serie A	Coppa Italia
0	1
- After extra time
- Date: 20 August 2005
- Venue: Stadio delle Alpi, Turin, Italy
- Referee: Massimo De Santis
- Attendance: 35,246

The 2005 Supercoppa Italiana was a match contested by 2004–05 Serie A champions Juventus (although subsequently stripped of the title due to Calciopoli) and 2004–05 Coppa Italia winners Inter Milan. The match took place on 20 August 2005, and resulted in a 1–0 win for Inter Milan after Juan Sebastián Verón's goal in extra time; Juventus' David Trezeguet had scored a regular goal just before half-time but it was not allowed due to a non-existent offside.

== Match details ==
20 August 2005
20:45 CET

Juventus	0–1 (a.e.t.)	Inter Milan
	Report	Verón 96'

Stadio delle Alpi, Turin
Attendance: 35,246
Referee: Massimo De Santis

Juventus	Inter Milan

JUVENTUS:
GK	12	(Italy) Antonio Chimenti
RB	27	(France) Jonathan Zebina		(substituted off) 111'
CB	28	(Italy) Fabio Cannavaro	(yellow card) 62'
CB	6	(Croatia) Robert Kovač
LB	19	(Italy) Gianluca Zambrotta (c)	(yellow card) 113'
RM	16	(Italy) Mauro Camoranesi		(substituted off) 73'
CM	4	(France) Patrick Vieira	(yellow card) 30'
CM	8	(Brazil) Emerson
LM	11	(Czech Republic) Pavel Nedvěd
CF	17	(France) David Trezeguet		(substituted off) 103'
CF	9	(Sweden) Zlatan Ibrahimović
Substitutes:
GK	32	(Italy) Christian Abbiati
DF	7	(Italy) Gianluca Pessotto
MF	20	(Italy) Manuele Blasi
MF	23	(Italy) Giuliano Giannichedda
FW	10	(Italy) Alessandro Del Piero		(substituted in) 73'
FW	18	(Romania) Adrian Mutu		(substituted in) 111'
FW	25	(Uruguay) Marcelo Zalayeta		(substituted in) 103'
Manager:
(Italy) Fabio Capello

INTER:
GK	1	(Italy) Francesco Toldo
RB	13	(Brazil) Zé Maria		(substituted off) 59'
CB	2	(Colombia) Iván Córdoba
CB	23	(Italy) Marco Materazzi	(yellow card) 61'	(substituted off) 63'
LB	16	(Italy) Giuseppe Favalli
RM	4	(Argentina) Javier Zanetti (c)	(yellow card) 89'
CM	14	(Argentina) Juan Sebastián Verón	(yellow card) 20'
CM	19	(Argentina) Esteban Cambiasso	(yellow card) 98'
LM	5	(Serbia and Montenegro) Dejan Stanković	(yellow card) 17'
CF	30	(Nigeria) Obafemi Martins		(substituted off) 100'
CF	10	(Brazil) Adriano
Substitutes:
GK	12	(Brazil) Júlio César
DF	25	(Argentina) Walter Samuel		(substituted in) 63'
MF	6	(Italy) Cristiano Zanetti
MF	8	(Chile) David Pizarro	(yellow card) 117'	(substituted in) 59'
MF	21	(Argentina) Santiago Solari
FW	9	(Argentina) Julio Ricardo Cruz
FW	20	(Uruguay) Álvaro Recoba		(substituted in) 100'
Manager:
(Italy) Roberto Mancini

MATCH OFFICIALS

- Assistant referees:
- Fourth official:

MATCH RULES

- 90 minutes.
- 30 minutes of extra-time if necessary.
- Penalty shoot-out if scores still level.
- Seven named substitutes
- Maximum of 3 substitutions.

== See also ==
- 2005–06 Serie A
- 2005–06 Coppa Italia
- 2005–06 Inter Milan season
- 2005–06 Juventus FC season
- Derby d'Italia
- 2021 Supercoppa Italiana - played between same teams
