= 2005–06 Juventus FC season =

Italian football club season

Juventus
2005–06 season
- President: Franzo Grande Stevens
- Manager: Fabio Capello
- Stadium: Stadio delle Alpi
- Serie A: 20th (originally 1st, stripped of the title, relegated)
- Coppa Italia: Quarter-finals
- Supercoppa Italiana: Runners-up
- UEFA Champions League: Quarter-finals
- Top goalscorer: League: David Trezeguet (23); All: David Trezeguet (29)
- Average home league attendance: 30,469
Home colours	Away colours	Third colours

The 2005–06 season was Juventus's 108th in existence and 104th consecutive season in the top flight of Italian football before the 2006 Italian football scandal stripped the club of its previous league title, as well as this season's league title, later awarded to Internazionale, and relegated to Serie B.

Following the enforced relegation, Juventus lost Fabio Cannavaro and Emerson to Real Madrid, Lilian Thuram and Gianluca Zambrotta to Barcelona, Adrian Mutu to Fiorentina, and Patrick Vieira and Zlatan Ibrahimović to Internazionale. The rest of the squad did however stay including Alessandro Del Piero, Gianluigi Buffon, Pavel Nedvěd, David Trezeguet, Giorgio Chiellini, and Mauro Camoranesi, for the following 2006–07 Serie B. This was also their final season at the Stadio Delle Alpi.

== Players ==
=== Squad information ===
Squad at end of season

Note: Flags indicate national team as defined under FIFA eligibility rules; some limited exceptions apply. Players may hold more than one non-FIFA nationality.

No.	Pos.	Nation	Player
1	GK	ITA	Gianluigi Buffon
2	DF	ITA	Alessandro Birindelli
3	DF	ITA	Giorgio Chiellini
4	MF	FRA	Patrick Vieira
6	DF	CRO	Robert Kovač
7	DF	ITA	Gianluca Pessotto
8	MF	BRA	Emerson
9	FW	SWE	Zlatan Ibrahimović
10	FW	ITA	Alessandro Del Piero (captain)
11	MF	CZE	Pavel Nedvěd
14	DF	ITA	Federico Balzaretti
15	DF	ITA	Domenico Criscito
16	MF	ITA	Mauro Camoranesi
17	FW	FRA	David Trezeguet
18	FW	ROU	Adrian Mutu

No.	Pos.	Nation	Player
19	MF	ITA	Gianluca Zambrotta
20	MF	ITA	Manuele Blasi
21	DF	FRA	Lilian Thuram
22	GK	FRA	Landry Bonnefoi
23	MF	ITA	Giuliano Giannichedda
24	MF	URU	Rubén Olivera
25	FW	URU	Marcelo Zalayeta
27	DF	FRA	Jonathan Zebina
28	DF	ITA	Fabio Cannavaro
32	GK	ITA	Christian Abbiati (on loan from AC Milan)
43	GK	ITA	Claudio Scarzanella
44	FW	ITA	Michele Paolucci
50	MF	CUB	Samon Reider Rodríguez
60	MF	ITA	Claudio Marchisio

== Transfers ==
In
Pos.	Name	from	Type
MF	Patrick Vieira	Arsenal	€20 million
DF	Giorgio Chiellini	Fiorentina	€7 million
DF	Robert Kovac	Bayern Munich	
MF	Giuliano Giannichedda	Lazio	
DF	Federico Balzaretti	Torino	
GK	Christian Abbiati	A.C. Milan	loan

Out
Pos.	Name	to	Type
DF	Ciro Ferrara		retired
DF	Paolo Montero	San Lorenzo	
MF	Stephen Appiah	Fenerbahce	
DF	Igor Tudor	Siena	loan
DF	Nicola Legrottaglie	Siena	loan
MF	Olivier Kapo	Monaco	
MF	Enzo Maresca	Sevilla	
MF	Alessio Tacchinardi	Villarreal	loan
DF	Raffaele Palladino	Livorno	loan
FW	Fabrizio Miccoli	Benfica	loan

=== Winter ===
In
Pos.	Name	from	Type

Out
Pos.	Name	to	Type
GK	Antonio Chimenti	Cagliari	loan

=== Out ===
Note: Flags indicate national team as defined under FIFA eligibility rules; some limited exceptions apply. Players may hold more than one non-FIFA nationality.

No.	Pos.	Nation	Player
26	DF	BRA	Gladstone (on loan to Hellas Verona)
—	MF	ITA	Luca Scicchitano (on loan to Ravenna)
—	MF	ITA	Alex Pederzoli (on loan to Pro Sesto)

== Competitions ==
=== Supercoppa Italiana ===
20 August 2005	Juventus	0–1 (a.e.t.)	Internazionale	Turin, Piedmont, Italy
20:45 CEST (UTC+02:00)		Report	Verón 96'	Stadium: Stadio delle Alpi; Attendance: 35,246; Referee: Massimo De Santis

=== Serie A ===
==== League table ====
Pos	Team	Pld	W	D	L	GF	GA	GD	Pts	Qualification or relegation
16	Lazio (Note: Milan, Fiorentina and Lazio were docked 30 points, all for involvement in the Calciopoli.)	38	16	14	8	57	47	+10	32	
17	Messina (Note: Messina were reprieved from relegation following Juventus's punishment.)	38	6	13	19	33	59	−26	31	
18	Lecce (R)	38	7	8	23	30	57	−27	29	Relegation to Serie B
19	Treviso (R)	38	3	12	23	24	56	−32	21	Relegation to Serie B
20	Juventus (Note: Juventus were originally the first-placed team, but the title was put sub judice due to the Calciopoli scandal. After court hearings, Juventus were placed at the bottom of the league table (points were not deducted), relegating them to Serie B, while the title was assigned to Internazionale, the team taking the first place in the end.) (D, R)	38	27	10	1	71	24	+47	91	Placed last, relegation to Serie B and disqualified from the Champions League group stage

Source: 2005–06 Serie A, Soccerway
Rules for classification: 1) points; 2) goal difference; 3) number of goals scored.
(D) Disqualified; (R) Relegated

==== Results summary ====
Overall								Home						Away					
Pld	W	D	L	GF	GA	GD	Pts	W	D	L	GF	GA	GD	W	D	L	GF	GA	GD
38	27	10	1	71	24	+47	91	14	5	0	33	9	+24	13	5	1	38	15	+23

Last updated: 14 May 2006.
Source: Competitive matches

==== Results by round ====
Round	1	2	3	4	5	6	7	8	9	10	11	12	13	14	15	16	17	18	19	20	21	22	23	24	25	26	27	28	29	30	31	32	33	34	35	36	37	38
Ground	H	A	H	A	A	H	H	A	H	A	H	A	H	A	H	A	H	A	H	A	H	A	H	H	A	A	H	A	H	A	H	A	H	A	H	A	H	A
Result	W	W	W	W	W	W	W	W	W	L	W	W	W	W	W	D	W	W	W	D	W	W	W	D	W	D	W	W	D	W	D	D	D	D	D	W	W	W
Position	4	3	1	1	1	1	1	1	1	1	1	1	1	1	1	1	1	1	1	1	1	1	1	1	1	1	1	1	1	1	1	1	1	1	1	1	1	20

Source: Competitive matches
A = Away; H = Home; W = Win; D = Draw; L = Loss; = Leader, UEFA Champions League Groups stage; = UEFA Champions League Groups stage; = UEFA Champions League Qualifying round; = 2006–07 UEFA Cup; = 2006–07 Serie B; R = 2006–07 Serie B, Juventus were originally the first-placed team, but were placed at the bottom of the league table due to the Calciopoli scandal, relegating them to Serie B.
The title was put sub judice, then assigned to Internazionale, the team taking the first place after the courts.

==== Matches ====
28 August 2005 1	Juventus	1–0	Chievo	Turin
20:30 CEST (UTC+02:00)	Trezeguet 36'	Report		Stadium: Stadio delle Alpi; Attendance: 24,693; Referee: Matteo Trefoloni

11 September 2005 2	Empoli	0–4	Juventus	Empoli
15:00 CEST (UTC+02:00)		Report	Trezeguet 11', 59'; Vieira 14'; Camoranesi 15'	Stadium: Stadio Carlo Castellani; Attendance: 13,454; Referee: Antonio Dattilo A.

18 September 2005 3	Juventus	2–1	Ascoli	Turin
15:00 CEST (UTC+02:00)	Del Piero 14' (pen.), 38'	Report	Cariello 32'	Stadium: Stadio delle Alpi; Attendance: 27,293; Referee: Paolo Tagliavento

21 September 2005 4	Udinese	0–1	Juventus	Udine
20:30 CEST (UTC+02:00)		Report	Vieira 37'	Stadium: Stadio Friuli; Attendance: 21,596; Referee: Nicola Ayroldi

24 September 2005 5	Parma	1–2	Juventus	Parma
20:30 CEST (UTC+02:00)	Delvecchio 14'	Report	Camoranesi 44'; Vieira 82'	Stadium: Stadio Ennio Tardini; Attendance: 23,116; Referee: Tiziano Pieri

2 October 2005 6	Juventus	2–0	Internazionale	Turin
20:30 CEST (UTC+02:00)	Trezeguet 22'; Nedvěd 34'	Report		Stadium: Stadio delle Alpi; Attendance: 33,772; Referee: Gianluca Paparesta

15 October 2005 7	Juventus	1–0	Messina	Turin
20:30 CEST (UTC+02:00)	Del Piero 24'	Report		Stadium: Stadio delle Alpi; Attendance: 30,097; Referee: Mauro Bergonzi

23 October 2005 8	Lecce	0–3	Juventus	Lecce
15:00 CEST (UTC+02:00)		Report	Ibrahimović 9'; Mutu 81'; Zalayeta 90+4'	Stadium: Stadio Via del Mare; Attendance: 24,941; Referee: Salvatore Racalbuto

26 October 2005 9	Juventus	2–0	Sampdoria	Turin
20:30 CEST (UTC+02:00)	Trezeguet 41'; Mutu 57'	Report		Stadium: Stadio delle Alpi; Attendance: 29,977; Referee: Antonio Dattilo A.

29 October 2005 10	AC Milan	3–1	Juventus	Milan
20:30 CEST (UTC+02:00)	Seedorf 14'; Kaká 26'; Pirlo 45'	Report	Trezeguet 76'	Stadium: San Siro; Attendance: 79,706; Referee: Paolo Bertini

6 November 2005 11	Juventus	3–0	Livorno	Turin
15:00 CET (UTC+01:00)	Ibrahimović 58'; Trezeguet 59'; Del Piero 90+1'	Report	De Ascentis (red card) 61'	Stadium: Stadio delle Alpi; Attendance: 28,897; Referee: Christian Brighi

19 November 2005 12	Roma	1–4	Juventus	Rome
20:30 CET (UTC+01:00)	Totti 65' (pen.)	Report	Nedvěd 45+1'; Ibrahimović 56'; Trezeguet 58', 61'; Thuram (red card) 62'	Stadium: Stadio Olimpico; Attendance: 68,816; Referee: Paolo Bertini

27 November 2005 13	Juventus	3–1	Treviso	Turin
15:00 CET (UTC+01:00)	Mutu 37'; Trezeguet 43'; Del Piero 82'	Report	Parravicini 25'	Stadium: Stadio delle Alpi; Attendance: 27,012; Referee: Salvatore Racalbuto

4 December 2005 14	Fiorentina	1–2	Juventus	Florence
15:00 CET (UTC+01:00)	Pazzini 39'	Report	Trezeguet 8'; Camoranesi 88'	Stadium: Stadio Artemio Franchi; Attendance: 43,537; Referee: Domenico Messina

11 December 2005 15	Juventus	4–0	Cagliari	Turin
15:00 CET (UTC+01:00)	Nedvěd 10'; Trezeguet 18', 53'; Vignati 68' (o.g.)	Report		Stadium: Stadio delle Alpi; Attendance: 27,587; Referee: Mario Mazzoleni M.

17 December 2005 16	Lazio	1–1	Juventus	Rome
20:30 CET (UTC+01:00)	Rocchi 16'	Report	Trezeguet 26'	Stadium: Stadio Olimpico; Attendance: 37,972; Referee: Tiziano Pieri

21 December 2005 17	Juventus	2–0	Siena	Turin
20:30 CET (UTC+01:00)	Cannavaro 13'; Trezeguet 54'	Report		Stadium: Stadio delle Alpi; Attendance: 27,000; Referee: Massimo De Santis

7 January 2006 18	Palermo	1–2	Juventus	Palermo
20:30 CET (UTC+01:00)	Terlizzi 12'	Report	Mutu 15', 34'	Stadium: Stadio Renzo Barbera; Attendance: 33,149; Referee: Paolo Bertini

15 January 2006 19	Juventus	1–0	Reggina	Turin
15:00 CET (UTC+01:00)	Del Piero 45'	Report		Stadium: Stadio delle Alpi; Attendance: 30,598; Referee: Daniele Tombolini

18 January 2006 20	Chievo	1–1	Juventus	Verona
20:30 CET (UTC+01:00)	Franceschini 21'	Report	Vieira 31'	Stadium: Stadio Marc'Antonio Bentegodi; Attendance: 18,673; Referee: Luca Palanca

22 January 2006 21	Juventus	2–1	Empoli	Turin
15:00 CET (UTC+01:00)	Cannavaro 17', 77'	Report	Almirón 3'	Stadium: Stadio delle Alpi; Attendance: 26,292; Referee: Andrea De Marco

29 January 2006 22	Ascoli	1–3	Juventus	Ascoli Piceno
15:00 CET (UTC+01:00)	Ferrante 33'	Report	Trezeguet 7', 13', 18'	Stadium: Stadio Cino e Lillo Del Duca; Attendance: 20,510; Referee: Salvatore Racalbuto

5 February 2006 23	Juventus	1–0	Udinese	Turin
15:00 CET (UTC+01:00)	Del Piero 70'	Report	Muntari (yellow card) 35' (yellow-red card) 37'	Stadium: Stadio delle Alpi; Attendance: 27,051; Referee: Antonio Dattilo A.

8 February 2006 24	Juventus	1–1	Parma	Turin
20:30 CET (UTC+01:00)	Ibrahimović 45'	Report	Dessena 39'	Stadium: Stadio delle Alpi; Attendance: 25,719; Referee: Luca Palanca

12 February 2006 25	Internazionale	1–2	Juventus	Milan
20:30 CET (UTC+01:00)	Samuel 74'	Report	Ibrahimović 63'; Del Piero 85'	Stadium: San Siro; Attendance: 78,606; Referee: Gianluca Paparesta

18 February 2006 26	Messina	2–2	Juventus	Messina
18:00 CET (UTC+01:00)	Floccari 3', 86'	Report	Ibrahimović 18'; Mutu 81' (pen.)	Stadium: Stadio San Filippo; Attendance: 30,550; Referee: Stefano Farina

26 February 2006 27	Juventus	3–1	Lecce	Turin
15:00 CET (UTC+01:00)	Emerson 18'; Kovač 44'; Del Piero 88' (pen.)	Report	Delvecchio 10'	Stadium: Stadio delle Alpi; Attendance: 26,721; Referee: Pasquale Rodomonti P.

4 March 2006 28	Sampdoria	0–1	Juventus	Genoa
20:30 CET (UTC+01:00)		Report	Nedvěd 69'	Stadium: Stadio Luigi Ferraris; Attendance: 35,369; Referee: Matteo Trefoloni

12 March 2006 29	Juventus	0–0	AC Milan	Turin
20:30 CET (UTC+01:00)		Report		Stadium: Stadio delle Alpi; Attendance: 39,087; Referee: Massimo De Santis

18 March 2006 30	Livorno	1–3	Juventus	Livorno
20:30 CET (UTC+01:00)	Pfertzel 52'	Report	Trezeguet 3', 53'; Del Piero 90+5'	Stadium: Stadio Armando Picchi; Attendance: 15,569; Referee: Paolo Donderini

25 March 2006 31	Juventus	1–1	Roma	Turin
20:30 CET (UTC+01:00)	Emerson 35'	Report	Kharja 85'	Stadium: Stadio delle Alpi; Attendance: 29,068; Referee: Matteo Trefoloni

1 April 2006 32	Treviso	0–0	Juventus	Treviso
18:00 CEST (UTC+02:00)		Report		Stadium: Stadio Omobono Tenni; Attendance: 6,586; Referee: Salvatore Racalbuto

9 April 2006 33	Juventus	1–1	Fiorentina	Turin
20:30 CEST (UTC+02:00)	Del Piero 63'	Report	Toni 47'	Stadium: Stadio delle Alpi; Attendance: 27,656; Referee: Tiziano Pieri

15 April 2006 34	Cagliari	1–1	Juventus	Cagliari
15:00 CEST (UTC+02:00)	Suazo 45'	Report	Cannavaro 90+5'	Stadium: Stadio Sant'Elia; Referee: Nicola Ayroldi

22 April 2006 35	Juventus	1–1	Lazio	Turin
15:00 CEST (UTC+02:00)	Trezeguet 87'	Report	Rocchi 29'	Stadium: Stadio delle Alpi; Attendance: 33,898; Referee: Gianluca Paparesta

30 April 2006 36	Siena	0–3	Juventus	Siena
15:00 CEST (UTC+02:00)		Report	Vieira 3'; Trezeguet 6'; Mutu 8'	Stadium: Stadio Artemio Franchi – Montepaschi Arena; Attendance: 14,833; Referee: Daniele Tombolini

7 May 2006 37	Juventus	2–1	Palermo	Turin
15:00 CEST (UTC+02:00)	Nedvěd 31'; Ibrahimović 51'	Report	Godeas 62'	Stadium: Stadio delle Alpi; Attendance: 56,488; Referee: Massimo De Santis

14 May 2006 38	Reggina	0–2	Juventus	Bari
15:00 CEST (UTC+02:00)		Report	Trezeguet 23'; Del Piero 90+1'	Stadium: Stadio San Nicola; Attendance: 40,000; Referee: Luca Banti

=== Coppa Italia ===
==== Round of 16 ====
1 December 2005 First leg	Fiorentina	2–2	Juventus	Florence
21:05 CET (UTC+01:00)	Bojinov 38'; Pazzini 50'		Pessotto 52'; Mutu 69'	Stadium: Stadio Artemio Franchi; Referee: Luca Palanca

10 January 2006 Second leg	Juventus	4–1 (6–3 agg.)	Fiorentina	Turin
21:00 CET (UTC+01:00)	Del Piero 9', 17', 56' (pen.); Mutu 21'		Bojinov 64'	Stadium: Stadio delle Alpi; Referee: Antonio Dattilo A.

==== Quarter-finals ====
26 January 2006 First leg	Juventus	2–3	Roma	Turin
21:00 CET (UTC+01:00)	Del Piero 72', 90+4'		Mancini 38'; Tommasi 61'; Perrotta 68'	Stadium: Stadio delle Alpi; Referee: Daniele Tombolini

1 February 2006 Second leg	Roma	0–1 (3a–3 agg.)	Juventus	Rome
21:00 CET (UTC+01:00)	Dacourt (red card) 18'		Ibrahimović (red card) 18'; Mutu 48' (pen.)	Stadium: Stadio Olimpico; Referee: Paolo Dondarini

=== UEFA Champions League ===
==== Group stage ====
Pos	Team	Pld	W	D	L	GF	GA	GD	Pts	Qualification
1	(Italy) Juventus	6	5	0	1	12	5	+7	15	Advance to knockout stage
2	(Germany) Bayern Munich	6	4	1	1	10	4	+6	13	Advance to knockout stage
3	(Belgium) Club Brugge	6	2	1	3	6	7	−1	7	Transfer to UEFA Cup
4	(Austria) Rapid Wien	6	0	0	6	3	15	−12	0	

Source: RSSSF

14 September 2005 1	Club Brugge (Belgium)	1–2	(Italy) Juventus	Bruges, Belgium
20:45 CEST (UTC+02:00)	Špilár (yellow card) 65'; Yulu-Matondo 85'	Report	Vieira (yellow card) 41' (yellow-red card) 89'; Nedvěd 66', (yellow card) 79'; Trezeguet 75'; Kovač (yellow card) 76'	Stadium: Jan Breydel Stadium; Attendance: 27,900; Referee: Luis Medina Cantalejo (Spain)

27 September 2005 2	Juventus (Italy)	3–0	(Austria) Rapid Wien	Turin, Italy
20:45 CEST (UTC+02:00)	Trezeguet 27'; Mutu 82'; Ibrahimović 85'	Report	Valachovič (yellow card) 47'	Stadium: Stadio delle Alpi; Attendance: 11,150; Referee: Martin Hansson (Sweden)

18 October 2005 3	Bayern Munich (Germany)	2–1	(Italy) Juventus	Munich, Germany
20:45 CEST (UTC+02:00)	Deisler 32'; Demichelis 39'	Report	Giannichedda (yellow card) 10'; Thuram (yellow card) 24'; Ibrahimović 90'	Stadium: Allianz Arena; Attendance: 66,000; Referee: Kyros Vassaras (Greece)

2 November 2005 4	Juventus (Italy)	2–1	(Germany) Bayern Munich	Turin, Italy
20:45 CET (UTC+01:00)	Kovač (yellow card) 19'; Ibrahimović (yellow card) 43' (yellow-red card) 90'; Trezeguet 62', 85'; Camoranesi (yellow card) 65'; Vieira (yellow card) 86'	Report	Schweinsteiger (yellow card) 32'; Zé Roberto (yellow card) 45'; Deisler 66'	Stadium: Stadio delle Alpi; Attendance: 16,100; Referee: Ľuboš Micheľ (Slovakia)

22 November 2005 5	Juventus (Italy)	1–0	(Belgium) Club Brugge	Turin, Italy
20:45 CET (UTC+01:00)	Zambrotta (yellow card) 39'; Del Piero 80'	Report	Clement (yellow card) 14'	Stadium: Stadio delle Alpi; Attendance: 9,625; Referee: Rob Styles (England)

7 December 2005 6	Rapid Wien (Austria)	1–3	(Italy) Juventus	Vienna, Austria
20:45 CET (UTC+01:00)	Kincl 52'	Report	Thuram (yellow card) 28'; Del Piero 35', 45'; Ibrahimović 42'; Camoranesi (yellow card) 63'	Stadium: Ernst-Happel-Stadion; Attendance: 20,000; Referee: Jaroslav Jára (Czech Republic)

==== Knockout phase ====
===== Round of 16 =====
21 February 2006 First leg	Werder Bremen (Germany)	3–2	(Italy) Juventus	Bremen, Germany
20:45 CET (UTC+01:00)	Schulz 39', (yellow card) 40'; Borowski 87'; Micoud 90+2'	Report	Nedvěd (yellow card) 38', (goal) 73'; Trezeguet (yellow card) 57', (goal) 82'; Balzaretti (yellow card) 68'; Vieira (yellow card) 81'	Stadium: Weserstadion; Attendance: 36,500; Referee: Manuel Mejuto González (Spain)

8 March 2006 Second leg	Juventus (Italy)	2–1 (4a–4 agg.)	(Germany) Werder Bremen	Turin, Italy
20:45 CET (UTC+01:00)	Nedvěd (yellow card) 61'; Trezeguet 65'; Emerson 88'; Del Piero (yellow card) 90+4'	Report	Micoud 13', (yellow card) 37'; Baumann (yellow card) 71'	Stadium: Stadio delle Alpi; Attendance: 35,000; Referee: Graham Poll (England)

===== Quarter-finals =====
28 March 2006 First leg	Arsenal (England)	2–0	(Italy) Juventus	London, England
20:45 CEST (UTC+02:00)	Fàbregas 40'; Henry 69'	Report	Camoranesi (yellow card) 23' (yellow-red card) 87'; Trezeguet (yellow card) 52'; Vieira (yellow card) 71'; Zebina (yellow card) 81' (yellow-red card) 89'	Stadium: Highbury; Attendance: 35,475; Referee: Peter Fröjdfeldt (Sweden)

5 April 2006 Second leg	Juventus (Italy)	0–0 (0–2 agg.)	(England) Arsenal	Turin, Italy
20:45 CEST (UTC+02:00)	Chiellini (yellow card) 41'; Nedvěd (yellow card) 70' (yellow-red card) 77'	Report	Flamini (yellow card) 19'; Reyes (yellow card) 38'	Stadium: Stadio delle Alpi; Attendance: 45,000; Referee: Herbert Fandel (Germany)

== Statistics ==
=== Appearances and goals ===
As of 31 June 2006

No.	Pos	Nat	Player	Total		Serie A		Coppa		Champions League	
No.	Pos	Nat	Player	Apps	Goals	Apps	Goals	Apps	Goals	Apps	Goals
1	GK	(Italy) ITA	Buffon	24	-21	18	-12	2	-3	4	-6
6	DF	(Croatia) CRO	Kovac	23	1	15+3	1	1	0	4	0
21	DF	(France) FRA	Thuram	39	0	25+2	0	4	0	8	0
28	DF	(Italy) ITA	Cannavaro	47	4	36	4	2	0	9	0
19	DF	(Italy) ITA	Zambrotta	42	0	32	0	1+1	0	8	0
16	MF	(Argentina) ARG	Camoranesi	44	3	25+9	3	1	0	8+1	0
4	MF	(France) FRA	Vieira	41	5	31	5	3	0	7	0
8	MF	(Brazil) BRA	Emerson	46	3	33+1	2	0+3	0	9	1
11	MF	(Czech Republic) CZE	Nedved	45	7	31+2	5	3+1	0	7+1	2
9	FW	(Sweden) SWE	Ibrahimovic	46	10	29+6	7	1+1	0	9	3
17	FW	(France) FRA	Trezeguet	41	29	28+4	23	0	0	9	6
32	GK	(Italy) ITA	Abbiati	27	-17	18+1	-9	2	-3	6	-5
18	FW	(Romania) ROU	Mutu	44	11	20+12	7	4	3	3+5	1
10	FW	(Italy) ITA	Del Piero	44	20	17+16	12	2+2	5	3+4	3
3	DF	(Italy) ITA	Chiellini	23	0	15+2	0	0	0	4+2	0
14	DF	(Italy) ITA	Balzaretti	28	0	13+7	0	4	0	2+2	0
23	MF	(Italy) ITA	Giannichedda	23	0	9+6	0	3	0	3+2	0
27	DF	(France) FRA	Zebina	14	0	7+3	0	2	0	2	0
20	MF	(Italy) ITA	Blasi	21	0	6+7	0	3	0	4+1	0
7	DF	(Italy) ITA	Pessotto	14	1	6+4	0	2	1	1+1	0
25	FW	(Uruguay) URU	Zalayeta	26	1	2+14	1	4	0	0+6	0
12	GK	(Italy) ITA	Chimenti	3	-3	2+1	-3	0	0	0	0
26	DF	(Brazil) BRA	Gladstone	1	0	0	0	0+1	0	0	0
24	MF	(Uruguay) URU	Olivera	2	0	0	0	1+1	0	0	0
	DF	(Italy) ITA	Birindelli								

Last updated: 31 June 2006
Source: http://calcio-seriea.net/presenze/2005/1276/

=== Top scorers ===
==== Serie A ====
- (France) David Trezeguet 23
- (Italy) Alessandro Del Piero 12
- (Sweden) Zlatan Ibrahimović 7
- (Romania) Adrian Mutu 7
- (Czech Republic) Pavel Nedvěd 4
- (France) Patrick Vieira 4
- (Italy) Fabio Cannavaro 4
