= Jonathan Zebina =

French footballer (born 1978)

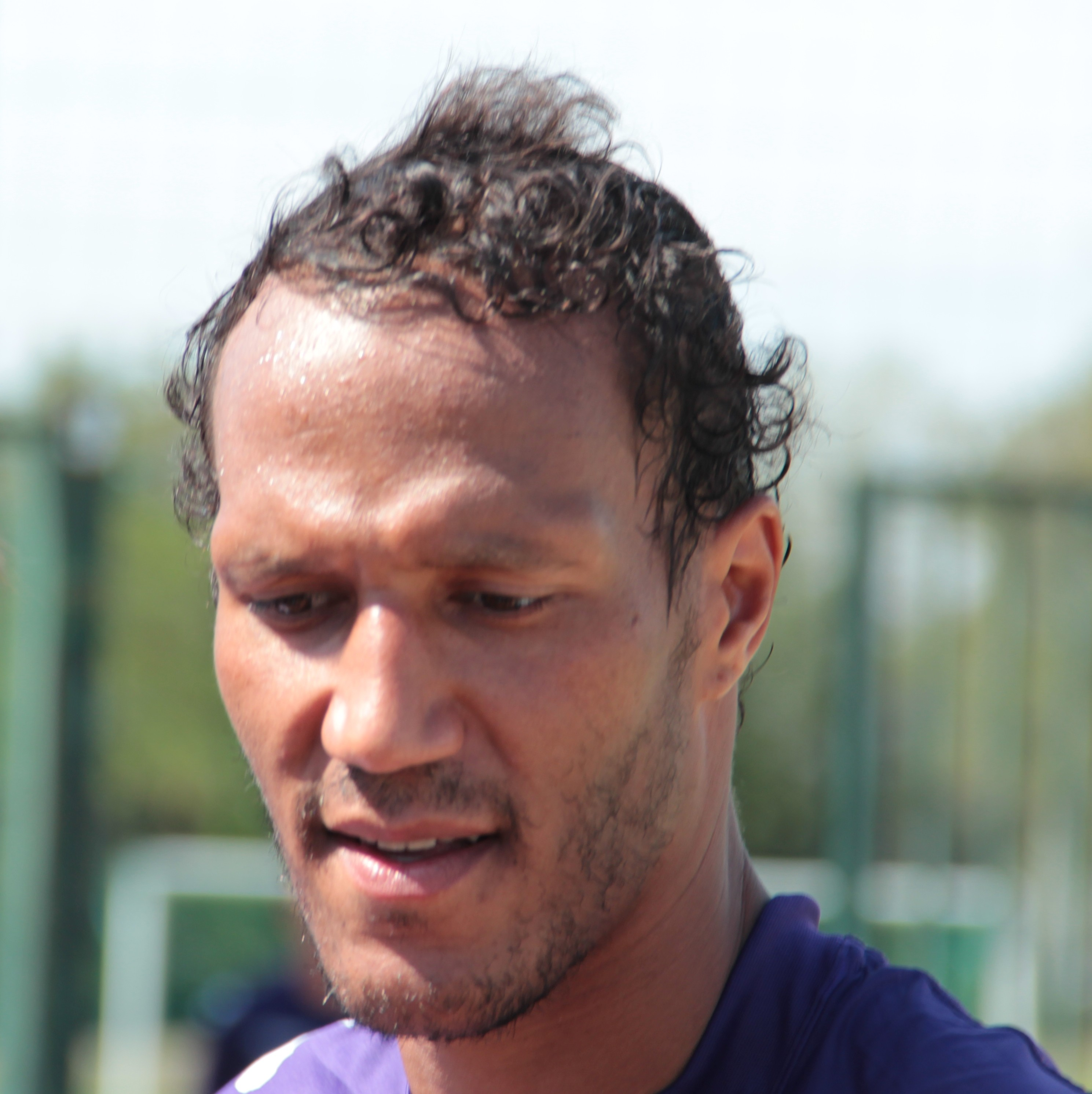
- Zebina training with Toulouse in 2012

Personal information
- Date of birth: 19 July 1978 (age 48)
- Place of birth: Paris, France
- Height: 1.84 m (6 ft 0 in)
- Positions: Right-back; centre-back

Youth career
- 1995–1996: Cannes

Senior career*
| Years | Team | Apps | (Gls) |
| 1996–1998 | Cannes | 27 | (0) |
| 1998–2000 | Cagliari | 48 | (0) |
| 2000–2004 | Roma | 88 | (1) |
| 2004–2010 | Juventus | 98 | (0) |
| 2010–2011 | Brescia | 28 | (0) |
| 2011–2012 | Brest | 28 | (0) |
| 2012–2014 | Toulouse | 37 | (0) |
| 2014 | Arles-Avignon | 6 | (0) |
| Total | | 360 | (1) |

International career
| 2005 | France | 1 | (0) |
- * Club domestic league appearances and goals

Jonathan Zebina (born 19 July 1978) is a French retired professional footballer. Having started his career as a striker, he played right-back for much of his career before being increasingly used as a centre-back. During his playing career, Zebina was an athletic defender, with good man-marking skills. However, Zebina, at times, was criticised throughout his career for being error-prone.

He spent his club career with several French and Italian clubs, most notably Roma – with whom he won a Serie A title and a Supercoppa Italiana in 2001 – and Juventus. At international level, Zebina obtained his only senior cap for the France national team in 2005.

== Club career ==
=== Cannes ===
Born in Paris, France, Zebina began his football career at US Palaiseau, first joining the club when he was seven years old and started out playing as a striker. However, due to competitions in the striker at the club's youth system, he was left out and soon playing in the right-back position. Zebina then played for ES Viry-Châtillon before joining AS Cannes, where he began his professional football career there.

After progressing through the youth system, Zebina made his debut for AS Cannes, where they were playing in the French Division 1 in a home game against Metz which ended 0–0 on 8 March 1997. He later made six more league appearances at the end of the 1996–97 season. The following year Zebina continued to develop and he made 21 league appearances as Cannes were relegated to Ligue 2.

=== Cagliari ===
Zebina was then signed by Cagliari Calcio, whose president had spotted him during a match against Marseille while scouting Cyril Domoraud.

I had to impose myself. There, you have to earn your place. This is why the support of my family has been essential in the development of my profession which is football. She followed me when I left Cannes for Cagliari and allowed me to keep a balance to which I am strongly attached. I remember my first match with Cagliari, it was against Inter Milan and I had Roberto Baggio on the mark. This deadline, this match, I had thought about it all week. I was anxious and euphoric at the same time. And you know what? At the end of the meeting, when I returned home with my relatives, everything evaporated. I was just happy. This entourage allowed me to go titillate the highest level. In Rome, for example, being a good footballer was not enough. I arrived, a year when the craze in the city was palpable. It wasn't even the pressure on our shoulders anymore. I hardly ever went out into town, it was very difficult to go unnoticed. To my great regret, moreover, I who like to be quiet. It was, at times, very difficult to live with. But like I said, my family has been very important in helping me get through the stages. I have not been offered anything in the world of football. So I clung to what is most dear to me. This latest exhibition has come full circle and elsewhere the gallery closed its doors after that. I realized that it was beyond a passion, a profession in its own right that I could no longer combine with that of a footballer.

He made his debut for the club, starting the whole game, in a 2–2 draw against Inter Milan in the opening game of the season. Since making his debut for Cagliari, Zebina was given a chance at a right-back position after injuries to two other defenders and soon made the position his own, in the process, he established a reputation as one of the most promising defenders in Europe. In the second half of the season, Zebina found himself placed in the substitute bench in a number of matches, at times, he returned to the starting line–up. In the last game of the season against Fiorentina, however, he scored an own goal, in a 1–1 draw. At the end of the 1998–99 season, Zebina went on to make twenty–four appearances in all competitions.

At the start of the 1999–00 season, Zebina, however, suffered ankle injury that saw him out for the first two months to the season. But he made his first appearance of the season, starting a match and played 76 minutes, in a 2–2 draw against AC Milan on 17 October 1999. Following his return from injury, Zebina appeared four more matches before being on the sidelines once again for two matches. Following his return, he continued to regain his first team place, playing in the right-back position. However, he was unable to help the club, as Cagliari were relegated to Serie B. During his time at the club, Zebina made fifty–eight appearances in all competitions for the Sardinian club between 1998 and 2000.

=== Roma ===
In June 2000, Zebina moved to AS Roma in a co-ownership deal for 9.5 billion Italian lire. Upon joining the club, he linked up with up with countryman and fellow full-back Vincent Candela and said: "I am very happy to be here. This is a big step for me from a professional point of view. I will try to give the best of myself. It doesn't scare me if I have to start off the bench. It will be a pleasure for me to fight for a place as a starter. My goal is to win against Roma and try to become stronger than Thuram."

Zebina made his debut for the club, starting the whole game, in a 4–1 win against ND Gorica in the first round of the UEFA Cup. He helped Roma keep a clean sheet in the return leg by beating the opposition team 7–0 to advance to the next round. Zebina followed up by helping the club keep two clean sheets in the next two matches against Bologna and Leece. However, he suffered an injury that saw him miss two matches. But Zebina made his return to the starting line–up against Reggina on 12 November 2000 and helped Roma beat the opposition team 2–1. However, his return was short–lived when he suffered a broken toe during a match against Perugia on 3 December 2000 and was substituted in the 43rd minute, as the club drew 0–0. After a month on the sidelines, Zebina returned to the first team against Bari on 14 January 2001, coming on as a 55th-minute substitute, in a 1–1. However, he found himself on the sidelines on four occasions in the next three months. Despite his absence later in the 2000–01 season, Zebina remained in the first team regular, playing in the centre-back position and helped Roma win the Scudetto. In his first season at the club, he made twenty–six appearances in all competitions.

At the start of the 2001–02 season, Manager Fabio Capello was impressed with Zebina's performances and skills and Roma bought him outright in July 2001. He started in the Italian Supercup against Fiorentina and helped the club keep a clean sheet, in a 3–0 win to win the competition. Since the start of the 2001–02 season, Zebina continued to regain his first team place, rotating in playing either the right-back position or centre-back position. He made his UEFA Champions League debut against Real Madrid on 11 September 2001 and won a penalty, which Francesco Totti successfully converted the penalty kick, as Roma lost 2–1. Zebina helped the club keep three consecutive clean sheets between 29 September 2001 and 16 October 2001 against Juventus, Perugia and Lokomotiv Moscow. He, once again, helped Roma keep three clean sheets out of the club's four matches between 16 December 2001 and 6 January 2002. However, in the second half of the season, Zebina found himself in and out of the starting line–up for Roma. He was also suspended on three occasions, including one against Inter Milan for slapping Álvaro Recoba, losing 3–0 on 24 March 2002. After serving a three match suspension, Zebina lost his first team place, as the club eventually surrendered their league title to Juventus at the end of the 2001–02 season. At the end of the 2001–02 season, he went on to make thirty–seven appearances in all competitions.

Ahead of the 2002–03 season, Zebina switched number shirt from fifteen to number five. At the start of the 2002–03 season, he was involved in a minor car crash, but escaped with cuts and bruises. The incident led Roma supporters booing him when his name was mentioned in the club's next match. Eventually, Roma supporters apologised for their actions to the player. Following his return, Zebina continued to regain his first team place, rotating in playing either the right-back position, centre-back position or left-back position. He helped Roma keep two consecutive clean sheets between 15 December 2002 and 21 December 2002 against Reggina and Torino. However, the start of the second half of the season saw Zebina suffered a muscular problems and was sidelined for a month. But he made his return to the starting line–up against Valencia in the first leg of the UEFA Champions League Group Stage, losing 1–0. However, in a follow–up match against Udinese on 24 February 2003, Zebina was sent–off in the last minutes for a second bookable offence, in a 2–1 loss. After serving a one match suspension, he returned to the starting line–up against rivals, Lazio on 8 March 2003 but suffered a muscle injury and was substituted in the 26th minute, as the club drew 1–1. Following this, Zebina was later sidelined on two more occasions for Roma later in the 2002–03 season. Despite this, he played in both legs of the Coppa Italia final against Milan, as Roma lost 6–3 on aggregate. At the end of the 2002–03 season, Zebina went on to make thirty–one appearances in all competitions.

At the start of the 2003–04 season, Zebina continued to establish himself in the starting eleven, rotating in playing in either the right-back position or centre-back position. In early–September, Roma began talks with the player over a new contract. He scored his first goal for the club, in a 2–2 draw against Juventus on 21 September 2003. This was followed up by helping Roma keep seven league clean sheets between 28 September 2013 and 23 November 2003. However, in the second half of the season, Zebina found his himself sidelined on five occasions, due to injury and suspension. He also was sent–off on two occasions: the first one came against Siena on 22 February 2004 and the second one came against Villarreal on 25 March 2004. Despite this, Zebina helped the club keep three consecutive clean sheets between 8 February 2004 and 22 February 2004. Despite being sidelined on two more occasions towards the end of the 2003–04 season, his contributions saw Roma finish in second place in the league behind Milan. At the end of the 2003–04 season, he went on to make thirty–two appearances and scoring once in all competitions. During his time at the club between 2000 and 2004, Zebina made 126 appearances and scoring once in all competitions.

=== Juventus ===
Towards the end of his spell in the Italian capital, AC Milan began to take notice of Zebina and reported that the player was on the verge of moving to the club as the 2003–04 season was coming to an end. He even rejected a new contract from Roma and was expected to leave the club at the end of the 2003–04 season. On 19 May 2004, however, Zebina elected to join Juventus on a free transfer, where he was reunited with departing Roma manager Capello. Zebina revealed that he had rejected moves to Chelsea, Liverpool and Milan in order to join the club. Zebina later explained his decision to join Juventus, saying that AC Milan wanted him to play "the second of Stam", while Inter Milan offered the player "an astonishing contract proposal", he felt the club "must have taken him for a young rookie".

However, Zebina had to wait for a month to make his debut for the club, due to a serving a suspension in both legs of the UEFA Champions League Play–Offs round against Djurgården that saw Juventus won 6–3 on aggregate to advance to the Group Stage. He made his debut for the club, starting the whole game, in the opening game of the season against Brescia and set up a goal for David Trezeguet, in a 3–0 win. Zebina helped Juventus keep three consecutive clean sheets between 19 October 2004 and 28 October 2004. Having found himself in a competition with Gianluca Zambrotta and Alessandro Birindelli, Zebina won a first team place, playing in the right-back position at the start of the 2004–05 season. However, he suffered an injury that saw him out for weeks. But Zebina made his return to the starting line–up against Inter Milan on 28 November 2004 and helped the club draw 2–2. Following his return from injury, he regained his first team place, playing in the right-back position. At one point, Zebina played in the right–midfield position on two occasions between 13 February 2005 and 19 February 2005. He helped Juventus keep another three consecutive clean sheets between 9 March 2005 and 19 March 2005. However, in the first leg of the UEFA Champions League quarter-finals against Liverpool on 5 April 2005, Zebina suffered a hamstring injury and was substituted in the 81st minute, as the club lost 2–0. After the match, he was sidelined with a hamstring injury for the rest of the 2004–05 season. Despite this, his contributions saw Juventus win the league (which they were later stripped of the league title). In his first season at the club, Zebina made thirty–one appearances in all competitions.

At the start of the 2005–06 season, Zebina made his first appearance of the season in the Supercoppa Italiana against Inter Milan, starting a match and played 111 minutes, as Juventus lost 1–0. In a follow–up match against Chievo in the opening game of the season, however, he suffered an injury in the 7th minute, as the club won 1–0. But Zebina made a quick recovery and returned to the starting line–up against Ascoli on 18 September 2005, only to be substituted in the 3rd minute, due to a hamstring injury, as Juventus won 2–1. Following this, he was sidelined for the rest of the year and had four separate injuries by then. As Zebina was returning from injury, the 2005–06 season was not his finest as a professional due to an argument with the Juventus management over his request for a pay rise. This led to rumours linking him with Premier League side Tottenham Hotspur. However, his move to England collapsed after Manager Capello persuaded him to stay. On 22 January 2006, he made his return from injury against Empoli, coming on as a 62nd-minute substitute, in a 2–1 win. This was follow–up by making his first start since September against his former club, Roma in the first leg of the Coppa Italia first leg, losing 3–2. However, in the return leg of the Coppa Italia quarter-finals against Roma, Zebina suffered an injury and was substituted in the 44th minute, as the club won 1–0, only to be eliminated from the tournament through away goal. After the match, he was sidelined for a month. But Zebina made his return to the first team against Milan on 12 March 2006 and started the whole game, as Juventus drew 0–0. Despite sidelined on three more occasions, including a red card in Juventus' Champions League quarter-final loss to Arsenal, along with Mauro Camoranesi, he was primarily used as a backup player, occasionally playing in the right-back position. Once again, his contributions to the club saw Juventus claimed the Scudetto to compensate for the European disappointment, but were stripped of their 2005 and 2006 titles after a match-fixing scandal that saw the club relegated to Serie B. At the end of the 2005–06 season, Zebina went on to make fifteen appearances in all competitions.

Despite coming under fire several times for his perceived inconsistency, Zebina stayed with Juventus following their relegation and was expected to have his first-team opportunities increase after the sale of Zambrotta to FC Barcelona ahead of the 2006–07 season. However at the start of the 2006–07 season, he missed the first months to the season, due to injury. Zebina recovered and made his first appearance of the season against Modena on 23 September 2006 and started the match before being substituted at half time, due to an adductor problems, as the club won 4–0. After the match, he was sidelined for two months with adductor problems. It was not until on 11 November 2006 when Zebina made his return to the first team, coming on as a 77th-minute substitute, in a 2–0 win against Pescara. Following his return, he found himself, rotating in and out of the first team, fighting for his first team place in the centre-back position. In the 2007 winter transfer window he turned down prospective moves to Marseille or Real Madrid after reports of the player was expected to leave Juventus, but stayed at the club. However, Zebina received a straight red card for hitting Adriano Mezavilla against Cesena on 16 January 2007, as Juventus won 2–1. After the match, he was fined by the club and served a three match suspension. Zebina returned to the starting line–up against Crotone on 17 February 2007 and helped Juventus keep a clean sheet, in a 5–0 win. Following his return, his first team opportunities increased and rotating in playing either centre-back position and right-back position. However, his performances was still criticised by Juventus fans following his mistakes in a number of matches. Despite suffering from injuries on three occasions later in the 2006–07 season, his contributions saw the club promoted back to Serie A after a 5–1 win against Arezzo on 19 May 2007. At the end of the 2006–07 season, he went on to make twenty–four appearances in all competitions. Following this, Juventus' Serie B title success, Zebina signed a new four-year deal that would keep him at the club until 2011, ending speculation over his future at Juventus.

Ahead of the 2007–08 season, Zebina faced competition from new signing, Zdeněk Grygera for the right-back position. However, during a 3–2 win against Cagliari on 2 September 2007, he was sent–off for a second bookable offence in the 81st minute and punched a photographer on the way out. For his actions, Zebina was banned for four suspension and ordered to pay a €15,000 fine. After serving a four match suspension, he made his return to the first team against Inter Milan on 4 November 2007, coming on as a 78th-minute substitute, in a 1–1 draw. Zebina then helped Juventus keep three clean sheets in three matches between 25 November 2007 and 9 December 2007. Since returning from injury, he, at times, made a number of starts for the club in the right-back position. However, Zebina had a disagreements with coach Claudio Ranieri that saw him dropped from the squad in a number of matches. He also faced his own injury concerns that saw him sidelined on five occasions later in the 2007–08 season. At the end of the 2007–08 season, Zebina went on to make seventeen appearances in all competitions.

Ahead of the 2008–09 season, Zebina was linked a move away from Juventus, with several European clubs interested in signing him. However, he suffered an Achilles tendon rupture at the start of 2008–09 season and was sidelined for the rest of the year. By February, Zebina made a recovery and returned to the starting line–up, playing against the club's Primavera against Sampdoria on 28 February 2009, drawing 0–0. A week later on 7 March 2009, he made his first league appearance of the season against rivals, Torino, starting a match and played 59 minutes before being substituted, in a 1–0 win. Following this, Zebina continued to compete with Grygera over the right-back position for the rest of the 2008–09 season. At the end of the 2008–09 season, he went on to make eight appearances in all competitions.

Ahead of the 2009–10 season, Zebina was linked with a possible transfer to Bordeaux during the transfer window but he rejected the move in favour of staying at Juventus. At the start of the 2009–10 season, Zebina lost his starting place to Martín Cáceres that season, despite Cáceres also being seen as inconsistent. He made his first appearance of the season against Bordeaux ironically in the UEFA Champions League group stage match on 15 September 2009, coming on as a 67th-minute substitute, in a 1–1 draw. After Cáceres' injury, Zebina returned to the starting eleven, regaining his place in the right-back position and remained in the starting eleven ahead of Cáceres despite the latter recovering from injury. He then scored his first goal for the club, in a 3–1 win against Fulham on 11 March 2010 in the first leg of the UEFA Europa League last 16. However, in the return leg, Zebina received a straight red card for kicking Damien Duff, as Juventus lost 4–1, resulting in the club's elimination from the tournament. After the match, he apologised for gesturing to Juventus supporters but defended his actions, claiming their behaviour acted inappropriately. Following this, the club faced a landslide slip in their results, as they finished 7th and numbers of players were sold or their contracts were not renewed, including Fabio Cannavaro. At the end of the 2009–10 season, Zebina went on to make twenty–two appearances and scoring once in all competitions.

Ahead of the 2010–11 season, Juventus decided not to buy Cáceres outright, but signed Marco Motta from Udinese on loan as new right-back. However, Zebina was included in Juventus's 25-man squad list A for 2010–11 UEFA Europa League play-offs round, due to his suspension from his red card in the qualifying round the end of last campaign. He also did not attend the pre-season camp, due to his international duty which delayed his vacation. Motta quickly became the starting right-back for Juventus in the first four matches of the season in the Europa League, and Zebina was not called up for the first Serie A game of the new season. On the last day of transfer window, his contract was mutually terminated along with Mauro Camoranesi, and David Trezeguet after Juventus strengthened their options in defence by signing Arsenal defender Armand Traoré on loan for the rest of the season, with a view to a permanent move.

=== Brescia ===
On the same day Zebina was released, he signed a two-year contract with Serie A newcomer Brescia. Zebina was previously linked with a move to Paris Saint-Germain before opting to join Brescia.

Shortly after signing for the club, he suffered an injury on his knee and had an operation on it which kept him out for about five weeks. After recovering from his knee injury, Zebina finally made his debut for Brescia, starting the whole game, against Udinese in a 1–0 loss on 17 October 2010. Since making his debut for the club, he quickly established himself in the first team, playing in the centre-back position. Unfortunately, Zebina had a frustrating campaign that ended with Brescia being relegated. Despite being suspended on two occasions later in the 2010–11 season, Zebina went on to make 28 appearances for the club in all competitions. On 8 July 2011, he and Brescia agreed to mutually terminated his contract.

=== Brest ===
After being released by Brescia, Zebina returned to France for the first time in twelve years, joining Ligue 1 newcomers Brest on 29 July 2011, with an option to extend a one-year contract. Upon joining the club, he explained joining Brest, stating his desire a move to England in the summer but that a lack of interest shown in his services forced him to turn his attentions elsewhere, with Brest, Saint-Étienne and Nice only interested in signing the player.

After missing the first two matches to the 2011–12 season, Zebina made his debut for the club, coming on as a late substitute, in a 1–1 draw against Lyon on 20 August 2011. Since joining Brest, he quickly established himself in the first team, playing in the centre-back position. His performance at the club attracted interest from Lille in the January transfer window, but Brest refused to let the player go. Zebina helped the club keep three consecutive clean sheets between 17 December 2011 and 14 January 2012. However, during a 1–0 loss against Paris Saint-Germain on 28 January 2012, Zebina suffered a back injury and was substituted in the 9th minute as a result. After missing one match, he returned to the starting line–up against Dijon on 11 February 2012 and helped Brest draw 1–1. This was followed up by helping Brest keep another three consecutive clean sheets between 18 February 2012 and 4 March 2012. However, during a 4–0 loss against Auxerre on 29 April 2012, Zebina suffered a calf injury and was substituted in the 30th minute. After the match, it was announced that he would be out for the rest of the 2011–12 season. Despite being sidelined on five occasions during the 2011–12 season, which saw the club finish in 15th place, Zebina went on to make twenty–nine appearances in all competitions.

Following this, Brest announced on 22 May 2012 that he would not extend his contract, which was due to expire at the end of June.

=== Toulouse ===
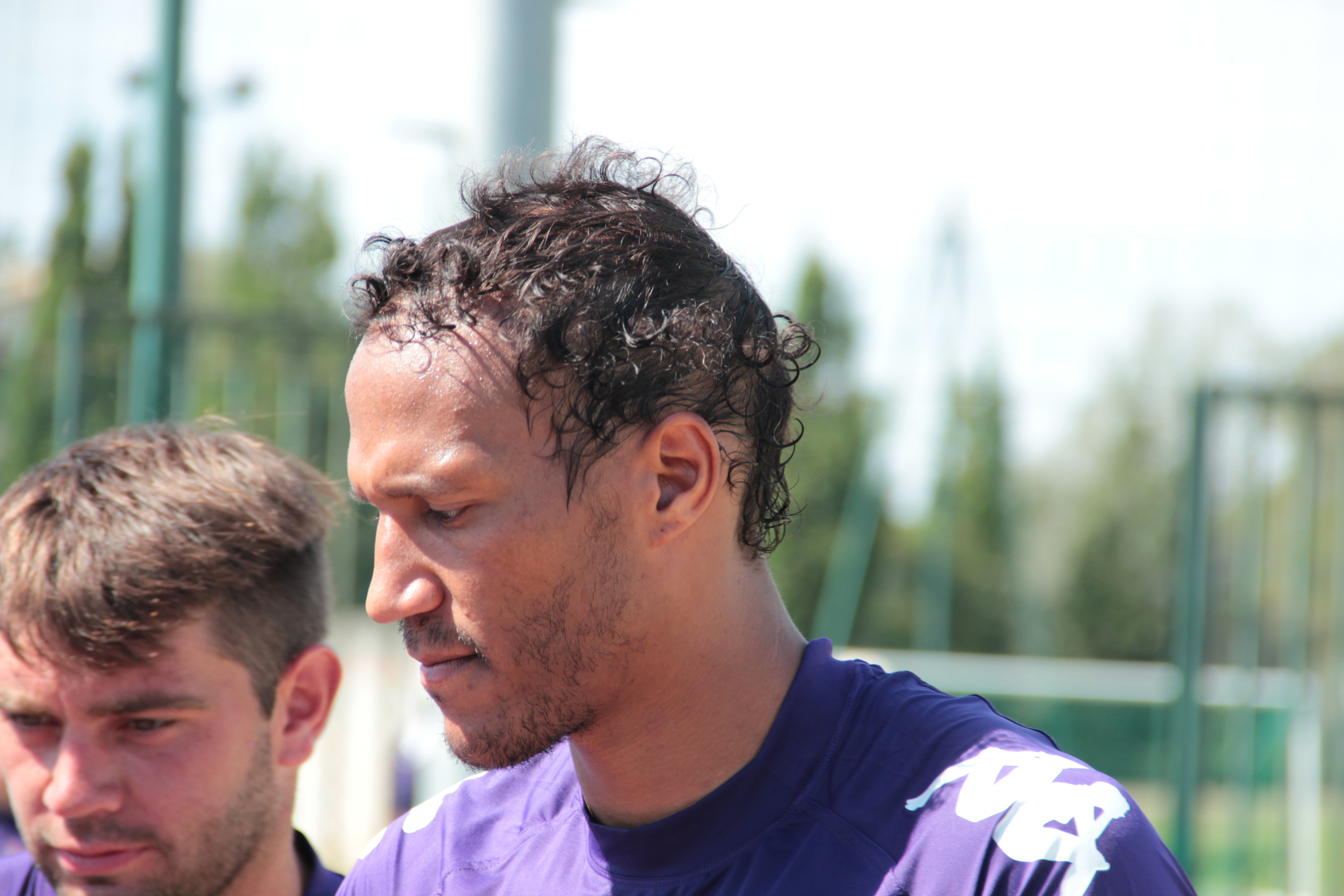
Zebina pictured at Toulouse's training ground on 15 April 2012.

After leaving Brest, Zebina was linked with a move to Sochaux, Lille and Toulouse. Instead, he joined Toulouse as a replacement for the outgoing Daniel Congré on a free transfer, signing a two–year contract. Upon joining the club, Zebina was given the number 11 jersey, and became the club captain.

He made his debut for Toulouse against defending champion, Montpellier in the opening game of the season and started the whole game, in a 1–1 draw. However, Zebina suffered a back injury and was sidelined for two months. It was not until on 6 October 2012 when he returned to the starting line–up against Valenciennes and started the whole game, in a 2–2 draw. However, his return was short–lived when Zebina suffered a calf injury that kept him out for weeks. But he made his return to the first team against Lyon on 25 November 2012, starting the whole game, and kept a clean sheet, in a 3–0 win. In a match against Saint-Étienne on 11 January 2013, however, Zebina suffered a thigh injury and was substituted in the 66th minute, as the club drew 2–2. After the match, he was eventually sidelined for two months as a result. But Zebina made his return to the starting line–up against Bordeaux on 17 March 2013 and helped Toulouse keep a clean sheet, in a 0–0 draw. On 30 March 2013, he scored an own-goal, against Ajaccio, to give the opposition the lead. Eventually, Toulouse would win 3–2 after a comeback fight. However, Zebina, once again, was sidelined once again when he suffered a hamstring injury that saw him out for the rest of the 2012–13 season. Despite the injuries, Zebina was still seen as important, and he remained a key member of the squad. However, Zebina was at fault for a few goals in the few matches he played that season. At the end of the 2012–13 season, Zebina went on to make eighteen appearances in all competitions.

The start of the 2013–14 season continue to see Zebina recovering from a hamstring injury, which he sustained in the pre–season. Zebina made his first appearance of the season, coming on as a late substitute, in a 2–1 win against Saint-Étienne on 20 September 2013. Since returning from injury, he found himself, rotating in and out of the starting line–up and captaining Toulouse in a number of matches, due to competitions in the centre-back position. However, in a match against Montpellier on 8 December 2013, Zebina received a red card for a second bookable offence, having came on as a second-half substitute, in a 1–1 draw. After serving a two match suspension, he returned to the starting line–up against Guingamp on 21 December 2013 and helped the club keep a clean sheet, in a 0–0 draw. Following his return, Zebina regained his first team place, playing in the centre-back position for the next three months. After being dropped for two matches in mid–February, he spoke about Toulouse's poor form on his social media account on two occasions. However, Zebina injured his right Achilles tendon that saw him sidelined for a month. But he made his return to the starting line–up against Guingamp on 10 May 2014 and played 90 minutes, as the club lost 2–0. In the last game of the season against Valenciennes, Zebina started the whole match as captain and help Toulouse win 3–1 to finish ninth place in the league. At the end of the 2013–14 season, he went on to make twenty–three appearances in all competitions.

It was announced on 25 February 2014 that Zebina hinted of leaving the club at the end of the 2013–14 season. His departure from Toulouse was later confirmed on 21 May 2014 after weeks of uncertainty over his future at the club.

=== Arles-Avignon ===
On 6 October 2014, Zebina joined AC Arles-Avignon on a two–year contract after spending five months as a free agent.

He made his debut for the club, starting a match and played 80 minutes before being substituted, in a 3–1 loss against Gazélec Ajaccio on 17 October 2014. However, in a follow–up match against Niortais, Zebina suffered a thigh injury that saw him miss one match. But he made his return to the starting line–up against Valenciennes on 7 November 2014, as Arles-Avignon lost 1–0. In a follow–up against Clermont, however, Zebina received a straight red card in the 42nd minute, as the club lost 3–1. After serving a two match, he made his return to the starting line–up against US Créteil on 12 December 2014, as Arles-Avignon lost 2–0. Having joined the club in early October 2014, Zebina had his contract terminated at the end of the year. By the time he departed from Arles-Avignon, Zebina made seven appearances in all competitions. Following this, he announced his retirement from professional football.

== International career ==
In 2001, Zebina was called up to the France for the first time by manager Roger Lemerre. For the next four years, having been a regular during his time at Roma and Juventus, he remained in Jacques Santini's plans throughout his tenure.

Zebina earned only one cap for France; on 9 February 2005 in a 1–1 draw against Sweden. However, after Santini departed the national side, he was never called up for France again after falling out of favour with new coach Raymond Domenech.

== Personal life ==
Yes, it was done when I was playing at Juventus deTurin. We can really speak of an adventure, because it was not planned. I still remember the day of the inauguration. The street was packed. I had succeeded in bringing together two opposing worlds. That of art and that of football. After necessarily, there was the sequel. I tried to do my best, to give my maximum. I think that we have succeeded in making exhibitions of great success. Until the last one that I really felt mine, when I managed to showcase contemporary African art. From that moment on, I understood that the life of a gallery owner, as a dealer, was not made for me. This latest exhibition has come full circle and elsewhere the gallery closed its doors after that. I realized that it was beyond a passion, a profession in its own right that I could no longer combine with that of a footballer.

His father, Denis, is an accountant, who has managed the family finances and his mother, Martine, is a nurse. Zebina has one brother and one sister. He has a diploma in accounting. Zebina said his hobby includes listening to music, watching art-house cinema, and a fan of wine. He is a fan of Aston Martin cars.

In September 2003, Zebina lost his driver's license after he was convicted of driving under the influence. In October 2005, Zebina once hosted a fashion show event that cost €200,000. Since 2006, he owns a large collection of contemporary art, and owns an art gallery in Milan.

During his early career in Italy, Zebina spoke about racism in Italian football, saying: "The tension cannot justify the insults. I'm not speaking as a Romanist but as a human being, if the players start to have the same habits as the racist fans around Europe, we won't go far. In the cold I don't mean nonsense. I'm just saying that players watched from all over the world, like those of Lazio, they cannot give such an unworthy example. If one of them says certain things, he doesn't do it out of stupidity, but out of ignorance, which is worse. So what to do?" On 29 March 2010, Zebina was hit by a fan as he was about to board the team's bus ahead of Juventu's match against Atalanta. Zebina stated: "Surely it is racism. […] It is a bad thing for the image of Italian football that does not deserve this. The Italian Football Federation has to do something […]".

In April 2010, Zebina announced his engagement to Chiara Tortorella, a daughter of magician, Cino Tortorella. In addition to speaking French, he is fluent in Italian since living in the country for two decades and also speaks Spanish and English.

During his time at Juventus, Zebina was involved in a training scuffle with teammate, Zlatan Ibrahimović. According to his autobiography, I Am Zlatan Ibrahimović, Ibrahimović said: "He (Zebina) tackled me very severely, I stood in front of him and told him that if he wanted to play hard, he had only to tell me. He hit me with a ball. I didn't have time to think it over, I hit him instantly and he hit the mat just as dry…", a claim that player denied, suggesting it was a ploy to sell more copies. The feud was reignited when Paris Saint-Germain and Toulouse face against each other on 5 October 2013 and after scoring a goal, Ibrahimović mimic pointing a gun in the direction of Zebina at the substitute bench.

In September 2017, Zebina was convicted of tax evasion, due to not declaring his income between 2011 and 2013. He was given a two–year suspended sentence and fined €10,000.

== Career statistics ==
=== Club ===
Appearances and goals by club, season and competition
| Club | Season | League | | | National cup (Note: Includes Coupe de France, Coppa Italia) | | League cup (Note: Includes Coupe de la Ligue) | | Continental | | Other | | Total | |
| Club | Season | Division | Apps | Goals | Apps | Goals | Apps | Goals | Apps | Goals | Apps | Goals | Apps | Goals |
|---|---|---|---|---|---|---|---|---|---|---|---|---|---|---|
| Cannes | 1996–97 | Division 1 | 6 | 0 | 1 | 0 | 0 | 0 | – | | – | | 7 | 0 |
| Cannes | 1997–98 | Division 1 | 21 | 0 | 3 | 0 | 1 | 0 | – | | – | | 25 | 0 |
| Cannes | Total | | 27 | 0 | 4 | 0 | 1 | 0 | 0 | 0 | 0 | 0 | 32 | 0 |
| Cagliari | 1998–99 | Serie A | 22 | 0 | 4 | 0 | – | | – | | – | | 26 | 0 |
| Cagliari | 1999–2000 | Serie A | 26 | 0 | 6 | 0 | – | | – | | – | | 32 | 0 |
| Cagliari | Total | | 48 | 0 | 10 | 0 | 0 | 0 | 0 | 0 | 0 | 0 | 58 | 0 |
| Roma | 2000–01 | Serie A | 22 | 0 | 0 | 0 | – | | 4 (Note: Appearances in UEFA Cup) | 0 | – | | 26 | 0 |
| Roma | 2001–02 | Serie A | 24 | 0 | 2 | 0 | – | | 10 (Note: Appearances in UEFA Champions League) | 0 | 1 (Note: Appearance in Supercoppa Italiana) | 0 | 36 | 0 |
| Roma | 2002–03 | Serie A | 19 | 0 | 4 | 0 | – | | 8 | 0 | – | | 31 | 0 |
| Roma | 2003–04 | Serie A | 23 | 1 | 2 | 0 | – | | 7 | 0 | – | | 32 | 1 |
| Roma | Total | | 88 | 1 | 8 | 0 | 0 | 0 | 27 | 0 | 1 | 0 | 124 | 1 |
| Juventus | 2004–05 | Serie A | 24 | 0 | 1 | 0 | – | | 6 | 0 | – | | 31 | 0 |
| Juventus | 2005–06 | Serie A | 10 | 0 | 2 | 0 | – | | 2 | 0 | 1 | 0 | 15 | 0 |
| Juventus | 2006–07 | Serie B | 24 | 0 | 0 | 0 | – | | – | | – | | 24 | 0 |
| Juventus | 2007–08 | Serie A | 16 | 0 | 1 | 0 | – | | – | | – | | 17 | 0 |
| Juventus | 2008–09 | Serie A | 8 | 0 | 0 | 0 | – | | 0 | 0 | – | | 8 | 0 |
| Juventus | 2009–10 | Serie A | 16 | 0 | 1 | 0 | – | | 5 (Note: Two appearances in UEFA Champions League, three appearances and one goal in UEFA Europa League) | 1 | – | | 22 | 1 |
| Juventus | Total | | 98 | 0 | 5 | 0 | 0 | 0 | 13 | 1 | 1 | 0 | 117 | 1 |
| Brescia | 2010–11 | Serie A | 28 | 0 | 0 | 0 | – | | – | | – | | 28 | 0 |
| Brest | 2011–12 | Ligue 1 | 28 | 0 | 0 | 0 | 1 | 0 | – | | – | | 29 | 0 |
| Toulouse | 2012–13 | Ligue 1 | 17 | 0 | 1 | 0 | 0 | 0 | – | | – | | 18 | 0 |
| Toulouse | 2013–14 | Ligue 1 | 20 | 0 | 2 | 0 | 1 | 0 | – | | – | | 23 | 0 |
| Toulouse | Total | | 37 | 0 | 3 | 0 | 1 | 0 | 0 | 0 | 0 | 0 | 41 | 0 |
| Arles-Avignon | 2014–15 | Ligue 2 | 6 | 0 | 1 | 0 | 1 | 0 | – | | – | | 8 | 0 |
| Career total | | | 360 | 1 | 31 | 0 | 4 | 0 | 40 | 1 | 2 | 0 | 437 | 2 |

=== International ===
Appearances and goals by national team and year
| National team | Year | Apps | Goals |
|---|---|---|---|
| France | 2005 | 1 | 0 |
| Total | | 1 | 0 |

== Honours ==
Roma

- Serie A: 2000–01
- Supercoppa Italiana: 2001

Juventus

- Serie B: 2006–07
