= 2003 Supercoppa Italiana =

- Event: Supercoppa Italiana
Juventus	AC Milan
Serie A	Coppa Italia
1	1
- After extra time Juventus won 5–3 on penalties
- Date: 3 August 2003
- Venue: Giants Stadium, East Rutherford, New Jersey, U.S.
- Referee: Pierluigi Collina
- Attendance: 54,128

The 2003 Supercoppa Italiana was a match contested by Juventus, the 2002–03 Serie A champions, and AC Milan, the 2002–03 Coppa Italia winner. It was the sixth appearance for Juventus (3 victories in 1995, 1997 and 2002) and the seventh for AC Milan (victories in 1988, 1992, 1993, 1994). The match was played in East Rutherford, New Jersey in the United States, the home pitch of the Major League Soccer club New York/New Jersey MetroStars (now New York Red Bulls), with a heavily Italian heritage in the region. Both teams were touring the US at the time as part of the ChampionsWorld Series, which this game also formed part of.

Juventus beat AC Milan on penalties, three months after losing to the same opposition in a shootout in the 2003 UEFA Champions League Final.

== Match details ==
3 August 2003
21:00 CEST (UTC+02:00)

Juventus	1–1 (a.e.t.)	AC Milan
Trezeguet 105+3'	(Report)	Pirlo 105+2' (pen.)
Penalties
Di Vaio (penalty scored); Trezeguet (penalty scored); Birindelli (penalty scored); Camoranesi (penalty scored); Ferrara (penalty scored)	5–3	(penalty scored) Pirlo; (penalty scored) Serginho; (penalty missed) Brocchi; (penalty scored) Nesta

Giants Stadium, East Rutherford, New Jersey
Attendance: 54,128
Referee: Pierluigi Collina

Juventus	AC Milan

GK	1	(Italy) Gianluigi Buffon
RB	15	(Italy) Alessandro Birindelli
CB	23	(Italy) Nicola Legrottaglie
CB	13	(Italy) Mark Iuliano		(substituted off) 107'
LB	19	(Italy) Gianluca Zambrotta
DM	3	(Italy) Alessio Tacchinardi	(yellow card) 81'
RM	10	(Italy) Alessandro Del Piero (c)		(substituted off) 68'
CM	18	(Ghana) Stephen Appiah
LM	11	(Czech Republic) Pavel Nedvěd
CF	9	(Italy) Fabrizio Miccoli		(substituted off) 53'
CF	17	(France) David Trezeguet
Substitutes:
GK	12	(Italy) Antonio Chimenti
DF	2	(Italy) Ciro Ferrara		(substituted on) 107'
DF	7	(Italy) Gianluca Pessotto
MF	8	(Italy) Antonio Conte
MF	16	(Italy) Mauro Camoranesi		(substituted on) 53'
MF	26	(Netherlands) Edgar Davids
FW	20	(Italy) Marco Di Vaio		(substituted on) 68'
Manager:
(Italy) Marcello Lippi

GK	77	(Italy) Christian Abbiati
RB	2	(Brazil) Cafu
CB	13	(Italy) Alessandro Nesta
CB	4	(Georgia (country)) Kakha Kaladze
LB	3	(Italy) Paolo Maldini (c)	(yellow card) 28'
DM	21	(Italy) Andrea Pirlo
CM	8	(Italy) Gennaro Gattuso		(substituted off) 46'
CM	20	(Netherlands) Clarence Seedorf		(substituted off) 77'
AM	10	(Portugal) Rui Costa		(substituted off) 81'
CF	7	(Ukraine) Andriy Shevchenko
CF	9	(Italy) Filippo Inzaghi
Substitutes:
GK	12	(Brazil) Dida
DF	14	(Croatia) Dario Šimić
DF	25	(Brazil) Roque Júnior
MF	23	(Italy) Massimo Ambrosini		(substituted on) 46'
MF	27	(Brazil) Serginho		(substituted on) 77'
MF	32	(Italy) Cristian Brocchi		(substituted on) 81'
FW	18	(Italy) Marco Borriello
Manager:
(Italy) Carlo Ancelotti

MATCH OFFICIALS

- Assistant referees:
- Fourth official:

MATCH RULES

- 90 minutes.
- 30 minutes of silver goal extra time if necessary.
- Penalty shoot-out if scores still level.
- Seven named substitutes
- Maximum of 3 substitutions.

== See also ==
- 2003–04 Serie A
- 2003–04 Coppa Italia
- 2003–04 AC Milan season
- 2003–04 Juventus FC season
- Juventus FC–AC Milan rivalry

Played between same clubs:

- 2016 Supercoppa Italiana
- 2018 Supercoppa Italiana
