= Mauro Camoranesi =

Italian football manager (born 1976)

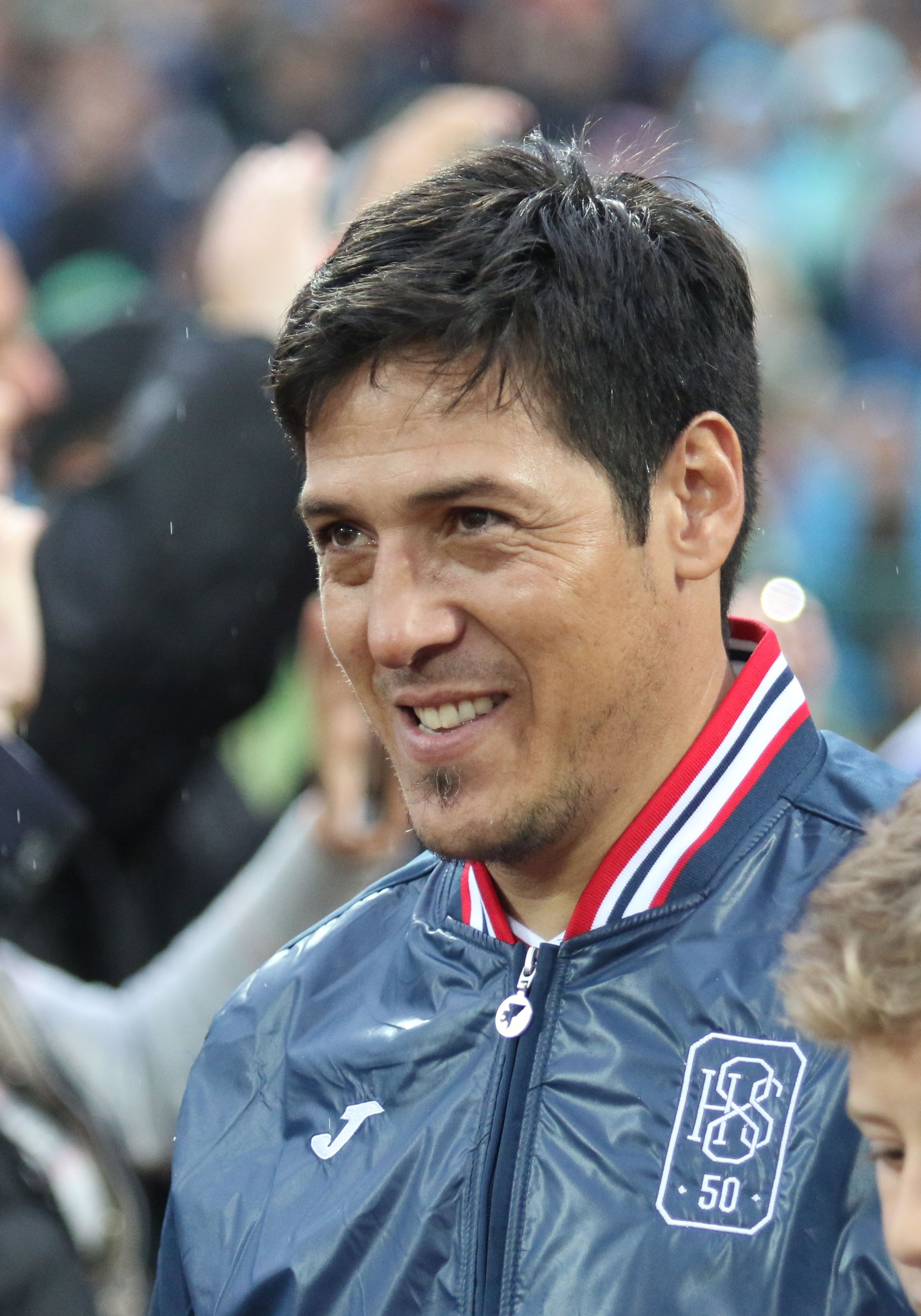
- Camoranesi in 2016

Personal information
- Full name: Mauro Germán Camoranesi Serra
- Date of birth: 4 October 1976 (age 50)
- Place of birth: Tandil, Argentina
- Height: 1.74 m (5 ft 9 in)
- Positions: Right midfielder; right winger

Senior career*
Years	Team	Apps	(Gls)
1995–1996	Aldosivi	31	(0)
1996–1997	Santos Laguna	13	(1)
1997	Wanderers	6	(1)
1997–1998	Banfield	38	(16)
1998–2000	Cruz Azul	75	(21)
2000–2002	Hellas Verona	54	(7)
2002–2010	Juventus	224	(27)
2010–2011	VfB Stuttgart	7	(0)
2011–2012	Lanús	35	(0)
2012–2014	Racing Club	39	(3)
Total		522	(77)

International career
2003–2010	Italy	55	(4)

Managerial career
- 2015: Coras de Tepic
- 2016: Tigre
- 2016–2017: Tapachula
- 2020: Tabor Sežana
- 2020–2021: Maribor
- 2023–2024: Floriana
- 2024: Karmiotissa
- 2024–2025: Anorthosis Famagusta
- 2026: Anorthosis Famagusta
- 2026: AEK Larnaca
Medal record
Association football
Representing Italy
FIFA World Cup
Winner	2006 Germany
- * Club domestic league appearances and goals

Mauro Germán Camoranesi Serra Ufficiale OMRI (Spanish: [ˈmawɾo xeɾˈmaŋ kamoɾaˈnesi ˈsera], (Note: In isolation, Germán is pronounced [xeɾˈman].) Italian: [ˈmauro kamoraˈneːzi; -eːsi]; born 4 October 1976) is an professional football manager and former player who played as a right midfielder or right winger. Born in Argentina, he played for the Italy national team.

Camoranesi began his career in Argentina in 1995, where he played for Aldosivi and Banfield, also having spells in Mexico with Santos Laguna and Cruz Azul, and in Uruguay with Wanderers. In 2000, he moved to Italy, joining Hellas Verona, where his performances earned him a transfer to defending Serie A champions Juventus in 2002. Camoranesi won the league title and the Supercoppa Italiana in his first season with the club, also reaching the UEFA Champions League final; he spent most of his career with the Turin side, also winning a second Supercoppa Italiana during his eight seasons with the Bianconeri. In 2010, he joined German side VfB Stuttgart for a season before returning to Argentina to play for Lanús, and subsequently Racing Club, where he retired in 2014. Following his retirement, Camoranesi began his managerial career later that year and has since coached Mexican club Coras de Tepic, Argentine side Tigre, Slovenian teams Tabor Sežana and Maribor, Maltese sides Floriana and Cypriot clubs Karmiotissa, Anorthosis Famagusta and AEK Larnaca.

Camoranesi made his debut for Italy in 2003. He took part at UEFA Euro 2004, UEFA Euro 2008, the 2009 FIFA Confederations Cup, and the 2010 FIFA World Cup, and was a member of Italy's winning squad at the 2006 World Cup.

== Club career ==
=== Early career ===
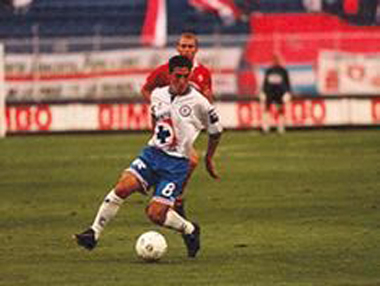
Camoranesi in October 1999

Born in Tandil, Camoranesi was a fan of River Plate growing up. He started his career at Aldosivi, 100 miles away from his hometown. He moved to Mexico to begin his professional playing career at Santos Laguna during the 1995–96 season and scored one goal in 13 games for the team; Santos Laguna fans nicknamed him "El Cholo".

The following year, Camoranesi moved to Uruguayan club Montevideo Wanderers briefly, before returning to his homeland to play for Banfield in 1997, solidifying himself as an attacking right midfielder, while playing 38 games with 16 goals.

The following season, Camoranesi returned to Mexico as a member of club Cruz Azul, where he played from 1998 to 2000, making 79 appearances and scoring 21 goals.

He caught the attention of Serie A side Verona and moved to Italy in 2000. He helped the club avoid relegation in his first season with four goals in 22 appearances.

=== Juventus ===
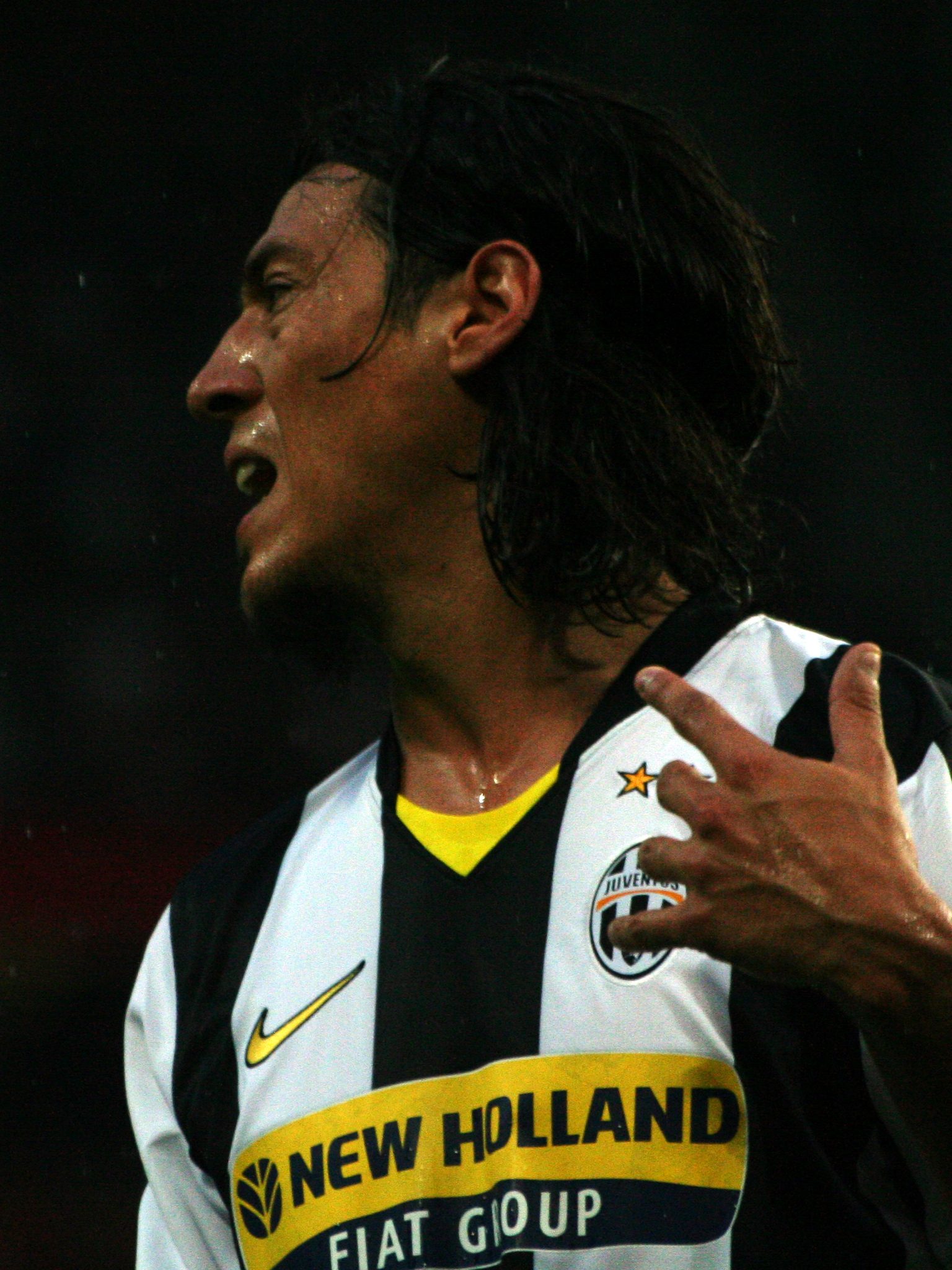
Camoranesi wearing Juventus' shirt in 2008

In 2002, Camoranesi was signed by Juventus on a co-ownership deal; initially, Juventus agreed to a price of €1 in cash plus player deal (which Max Vieri was sold for €517,000 (or 1 billion lire) plus €2.324 million cash (or 4.5 billion lire cash)) On 26 June 2003, he was signed outright by the Bianconeri on a permanent basis for an additional fee of €5 million; this was the same day Juventus signed Marco Di Vaio in similar deal.

Camoranesi soon established himself in the starting line-up on the right wing following an injury to Gianluca Zambrotta, and in his first season with the club, he won the 2002–03 Serie A title and the 2002 Supercoppa Italiana, also reaching the 2003 UEFA Champions League Final; the following season, he also added the 2003 Supercoppa Italiana to his trophy cabinet. Camoranesi also won two more Serie A titles with Juventus in the 2004–05 and 2005–06 seasons, but Juventus were stripped of both of those titles as result of their involvement in the 2006 Italian football scandal, and relegated to Serie B.

Despite his agent Sergio Fortunato linking the player to clubs such as Lyon, Valencia and Liverpool over the summer of 2006, following Juventus's relegation, Camoranesi made an announcement himself in September, pledging loyalty to Juventus: "In January, I will not ask to be sold; I'm happy to stay here."

Camoranesi put on some notable performances and contributed to a number of goals for Juventus during the 2006–07 Serie B season, scoring 4 in total, as his team won the title and earned promotion back to the Italian top flight. Against Lecce in April 2007, he performed a manoeuvre similar to a Cruyff turn, turning the ball through a defender's legs on the wing, before retrieving it to help set up Juventus's first goal of the match. Later in the match, he scored his side's third; Camoranesi took the ball past three Lecce defenders before hitting the ball from the edge of the box with his left foot into the top corner. Just days before he had scored a header in the 2–0 victory against close title contenders Napoli.

Despite initial rumours of his departure, on 10 July 2007, he extended his contract with the club until 2010. For the 2007–08 Serie A season, his shirt number was changed from 16 to 8. In spite of suffering several injuries during the 2007–08 season, he scored 5 goals in 22 appearances and also won the Guerin d'Oro award as the player with the highest average rating.

Camoranesi changed back to the number 16 jersey ahead of the 2008–09 Serie A season and also extended his contract for another year. After pre-season, he was often sidelined by injuries at the start of the season. After struggling in the first few games at the beginning of the 2009–10 Serie A season, Camoranesi came back strongly and proved to be one of Juventus's most essential players. He scored the solitary goal against Maccabi Haifa in the Champions League, as well as a brace in a 5–2 win over Atalanta.

=== Stuttgart ===
On 31 August 2010, Camoranesi signed a one-year contract with VfB Stuttgart as a free agent. His contract with Juventus was mutually terminated on the same day. On 26 January 2011, his contract with Stuttgart was mutually terminated, with Camoranesi admitting that he "just didn't fit in the club sporting wise, although he liked the team, the people and the city." He expressed a desire to continue his career in Argentina.

=== Lanús ===
On 2 February 2011, Camoranesi signed a two-year contract with Lanús with the option to coach youth players if he chose to retire. In October 2011, he made headlines for kicking an opponent in the head. In a match against Racing Club, he fouled Patricio Toranzo and was shown a red card by the referee. Instead of walking off, Camoranesi ran back and kicked the same opponent in the head while Toranzo was still lying on the ground. Toranzo later commented that Camoranesi is "not much of a man, just a coward" and suggested Camoranesi would need to see a psychiatrist for his violent behaviour. Camoranesi faced a long ban from football for this incident.

=== Racing Club ===
On 20 July 2012, Camoranesi signed in for Argentine side Racing Club. On 13 June 2013, he announced that he would retire from football at the end of the season in June, although rumours circulated he could be close to joining Leicester City to link up with Argentine midfielder Esteban Cambiasso. On 16 March 2014, he came on as a 68th-minute substitute for Rodrigo De Paul, as his side lost 0–2 away to Newell's Old Boys, for whom former Juventus teammate David Trezeguet scored the second goal in the 83rd minute. This turned out to be Camoranesi's last game in his career.

== International career ==
Camoranesi was eligible for Italian citizenship through a great-grandfather, Luigi, who in 1873 emigrated from Potenza Picena, in Italy's Marche region, to Argentina. His dual citizenship made him eligible to play for either Argentina or Italy, but the Azzurri showed interest in him first and, on 12 February 2003, he made his international debut in a friendly match against Portugal, which his team won 1–0 under manager Giovanni Trapattoni; consequently, Camoranesi became the first oriundo to appear for Italy in 40 years, with the last being the Brazilian-born Angelo Sormani. Under Trapattoni, Camoranesi played for Italy at UEFA Euro 2004, where they were eliminated in the first round. Camoranesi's first senior international goal came in a 2006 World Cup qualifier away to Belarus on 7 September 2005, which the Italians won 4–1.

Camoranesi was also part of Marcello Lippi's Italy team which won the 2006 FIFA World Cup. During the 2006 FIFA World Cup finals in Germany, he admitted the reason for not singing Italy's national anthem before their matches was because he did not know the words, although he could be seen singing (at least a part of) the anthem during the World Cup celebrations in Circus Maximus on 10 July 2006. Camoranesi was not the first Juventus player born in Argentina to play for Italy; Omar Sívori played for the Azzurri, as well as Luis Monti and Raimundo Orsi, who also won the World Cup while playing for Juventus. Fellow oriundi Anfilogino Guarisi, Attilio Demaría, Enrique Guaita, and Michele Andreolo also won the World Cup with Italy before him under manager Vittorio Pozzo in the 1930s, with Camoranesi being the only oriundo to win the World Cup with Italy after World War II.

At the end of 2006 FIFA World Cup Final match in Germany, in which Italy defeated France 5–3 in a penalty shoot-out after a 1–1 draw, Camoranesi had teammate Massimo Oddo chop off a large chunk of his long hair as the rest of the squad danced around them in a circle. Camoranesi then went up to the camera and dedicated the triumph by saying in Spanish: "Para los pibes del barrio" (For the guys from the neighbourhood).

Camoranesi commented in an interview regarding the World Cup victory: "I feel Argentine, but I have worthily defended the colours of Italy. I think that nobody can say otherwise."

He was successively called up to Italy's squad for UEFA Euro 2008 under manager Roberto Donadoni; Italy were knocked out on penalties by eventual champions Spain, following a goalless draw. Upon Lippi's return, he also took part at the 2009 FIFA Confederations Cup, in which Italy were eliminated in the group stage following a 3–0 loss to eventual champions Brazil in their third first-round match. Later that same year, he scored Italy's first goal with a header from a corner in a 2–2 away draw against Ireland on 10 October, which allowed Italy to qualify for the 2010 World Cup with two games to spare; this was his final international goal. Camoranesi took part at the 2010 FIFA World Cup; the latter tournament was his last experience with the Italy national team, with his final appearance coming in Italy's second group match, a 1–1 draw against New Zealand. Italy were eliminated in the first round once again, following a 3–2 defeat to Slovakia, finishing bottom of their group. In total, Camoranesi was capped 55 times by Italy between 2003 and 2010, and scored four goals.

== Managerial career ==
On 15 December 2017, Camoranesi received his coaching licence.

Camoranesi was appointed manager of Slovenian PrvaLiga side Tabor Sežana on 3 January 2020, signing a one-and-a-half-year contract. Eight months later he signed a three-year contract at Maribor in the same league. He was sacked on 23 February 2021.

On 5 July 2022, Camoranesi was appointed assistant manager of Olympique de Marseille after Igor Tudor became the manager of the club. However, he left the team only a week later when Tudor named Hari Vukas as his assistant.

Camoranesi was appointed head coach of Maltese Premier League club Floriana on 5 June 2023 for the 2023–24 season.

On 2 October 2024, Camoranesi was hired as the new head coach of Cypriot First Division club Karmiotissa. He departed Karmiotissa later on 24 October, after less than a month since his appointment, having served for only two games in charge of the team.

On 27 November 2024, Camoranesi signed for another Cypriot team, Anorthosis Famagusta, agreeing on a deal until the end of the season.

== Style of play ==
Camoranesi was a dynamic, hard-working, and skillful midfielder, who usually deployed on the right wing, or on occasion on the left flank, or as a central or attacking midfielder behind the strikers. He was a quick, energetic, and technically gifted player, with excellent ball control, who excelled at dribbling and beating players in one on one situations and getting up the flank. He was also gifted with good vision, creativity, crossing and passing ability with his right foot, which allowed him to create chances for his teammates. In addition to these characteristics, he also had an accurate and powerful shot, in particular from outside the penalty area, and was known for both his offensive and defensive contribution, which enabled him to start attacks after winning back the ball. A tenacious winger, throughout his career, he was however criticised for his aggression and lack of discipline at times, which caused him to pick up unnecessary bookings.

== Career statistics ==
=== Club ===
Appearances and goals by club, season and competition
Club	Season	League			National cup (Note: Includes Coppa Italia, DFB-Pokal, Copa Argentina)		Continental		Other		Total	
Club	Season	Division	Apps	Goals	Apps	Goals	Apps	Goals	Apps	Goals	Apps	Goals
Aldosivi	1994–95	Primera B Nacional	31	0	–		–		–		31	0
Santos Laguna	1995–96	Primera División de México	13	1					–		13	1
Montevideo Wanderers	1997	Uruguayan Primera División	6	1	–				–		6	1
Banfield	1997–98	Primera B Nacional	38	16	–		–		–		38	16
Cruz Azul	1998–99	Primera División de México	39	11	–		–		–		39	11
Cruz Azul	1999–2000	Primera División de México	36	10	–		–		–		36	10
Cruz Azul	Total		75	21	–		–		–		75	21
Hellas Verona	2000–01	Serie A	22	4	1	0	—		—		23	4
Hellas Verona	2001–02	Serie A	29	3	1	0	—		—		30	3
Hellas Verona	Total		51	7	2	0	—		—		53	7
Juventus	2002–03	Serie A	30	4	1	0	13 (Note: Appearances in UEFA Champions League)	1	1 (Note: Appearance in Supercoppa Italiana)	0	45	5
Juventus	2003–04	Serie A	26	3	5	1	4	0	1	0	36	4
Juventus	2004–05	Serie A	36	4	1	0	9	1	—		46	5
Juventus	2005–06	Serie A	34	3	0	0	9	0	1	0	44	3
Juventus	2006–07	Serie B	33	4	2	0	—		—		35	4
Juventus	2007–08	Serie A	22	5	1	0	—		—		23	5
Juventus	2008–09	Serie A	19	1	1	0	6	1	—		26	2
Juventus	2009–10	Serie A	24	3	0	0	9 (Note: Six appearances and one goal in UEFA Champions League, three appearances in UEFA Europa League)	1	—		33	4
Juventus	Total		224	27	11	1	50	4	3	0	288	32
VfB Stuttgart	2010–11	Bundesliga	7	0	1	0	6 (Note: Appearances in UEFA Europa League)	0	—		14	0
Lanús	2010–11	Argentine Primera División	17	0	—		2 (Note: Appearances in Copa Sudamericana)	0	—		19	0
Lanús	2011–12	Argentine Primera División	18	0	—		5 (Note: Appearances in Copa Libertadores)	1	—		23	1
Lanús	Total		35	0	—		7	1	—		42	1
Racing Club	2012–13	Argentine Primera División	29	3	1	0	1	0	—		31	3
Racing Club	2013–14	Argentine Primera División	10	0	1	0	—		—		11	0
Racing Club	Total		39	3	2	0	1	0	—		42	3
Career total			488	74	16	1	64	5	3	0	571	82

=== International ===
Appearances and goals by national team and year
National team	Year	Apps	Goals
Italy	2003	6	0
Italy	2004	5	0
Italy	2005	7	1
Italy	2006	11	1
Italy	2007	4	0
Italy	2008	9	1
Italy	2009	11	1
Italy	2010	2	0
Total		55	4

Scores and results list Italy's goal tally first, score column indicates score after each Camoranesi goal.

List of international goals scored by Mauro Camoranesi
No.	Date	Venue	Opponent	Score	Result	Competition
1	7 September 2005	Dinamo Stadium, Minsk, Belarus	Belarus	4–1	4–1	2006 FIFA World Cup qualification
2	11 October 2006	Boris Paichadze Dinamo Arena, Tbilisi, Georgia	Georgia	2–1	3–1	UEFA Euro 2008 qualifying
3	30 May 2008	Stadio Artemio Franchi, Florence, Italy	Belgium	3–0	3–1	Friendly
4	10 October 2009	Croke Park, Dublin, Ireland	Republic of Ireland	1–1	2–2	2010 FIFA World Cup qualification

== Managerial statistics ==
As of match played 12 May 2024

Team	From	To	Record				
Team	From	To	G	W	D	L	Win %
Coras de Tepic	16 December 2014	19 August 2015	25	7	9	9	28.00
Tigre	21 December 2015	18 March 2016	7	1	2	4	14.29
Tapachula	30 August 2016	22 January 2017	14	4	2	8	28.57
Tabor Sežana	3 January 2020	3 September 2020	19	10	3	6	52.63
Maribor	3 September 2020	23 February 2021	21	11	6	4	52.38
Floriana	5 June 2023	15 May 2024	31	21	5	5	67.74
Total			117	54	27	36	46.15

== Honours ==
Cruz Azul

- Mexican Primera División runner-up: Invierno 1999

Juventus

- Serie A: 2002–03
- Supercoppa Italiana: 2002, 2003; runner-up 2005
- Serie B: 2006–07
- Coppa Italia runner-up: 2003–04
- UEFA Champions League runner-up: 2002–03

Racing Club

- Copa Argentina runner-up: 2011–12

Italy

- FIFA World Cup: 2006

Individual

- Guerin d'Oro: 2007–08

Orders

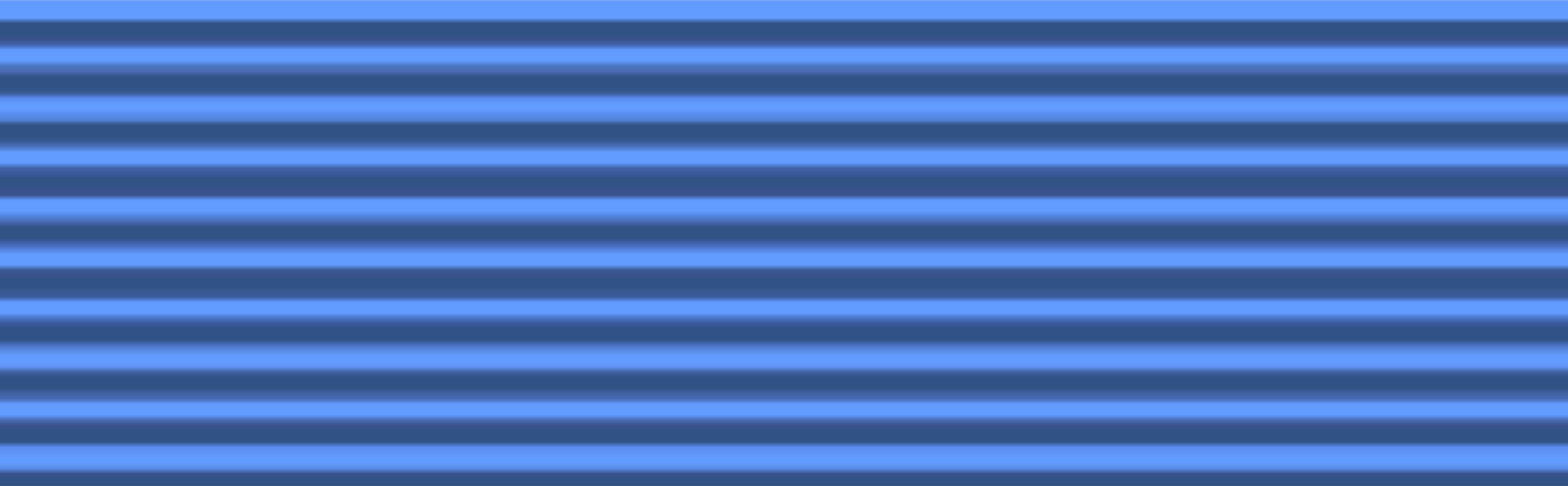
- CONI: Golden Collar of Sports Merit: 2006
- 4th Class / Officer: Ufficiale Ordine al Merito della Repubblica Italiana: 2006
