= Giuliano Giannichedda =

Italian footballer and manager

Personal information
- Date of birth: 21 September 1974 (age 52)
- Place of birth: Pontecorvo, Italy
- Height: 1.79 m (5 ft 10 in)
- Position: Midfielder

Team information
- Current team: Italy U18/U19 amateurs (manager)

Youth career
- 1991–1992: Pontecorvo

Senior career*
Years	Team	Apps	(Gls)
1992–1995	Sora	64	(2)
1995–2001	Udinese	151	(2)
2001–2005	Lazio	107	(1)
2005–2007	Juventus	35	(0)
2007–2008	Livorno	8	(0)
Total		301	(3)

International career
1997	Italy U23	4	(0)
1999	Italy	3	(0)

Managerial career
- 2013–2014: Italy U20 (assistant)
- 2014–2016: Italy U17 (assistant)
- 2016–2017: Racing Roma
- 2018: Viterbese
- 2018: Pro Piacenza
- 2019: Aprilia
- 2019–: Italy U18/U19 (amateurs)
- * Club domestic league appearances and goals

Giuliano Giannichedda (Italian pronunciation: [dʒuˈljaːno dʒanniˈkɛdda]; born 21 September 1974) is an Italian professional football manager, and former footballer who played as a defensive midfielder.

He appeared in 281 Serie A games over the course of twelve seasons (three goals scored), mainly in representation of Udinese and Lazio.

== Club career ==
Born in Pontecorvo, Frosinone, Giannichedda started his senior career with Sora in the fourth division, promoting to the third level at the end of the second of his three years. In the summer of 1995, he moved straight to the Serie A with Udinese, playing an average of 30 league games during his last four seasons at the Stadio Friuli; in 2000, he won the UEFA Intertoto Cup.

Giannichedda signed with Lazio for the 2001–02 campaign. He was regularly played as a starter during his four-year spell, winning the 2004 edition of the Coppa Italia.

In the summer of 2005, Giannichedda left Rome and joined Juventus, where he struggled for playing time under manager Fabio Capello, often being deployed as a substitute along with Manuele Blasi behind starters Emerson and Patrick Vieira. He only made 24 overall appearances in his first year, winning the league title; the team was stripped of the accolade, however, due to the club's involvement in the 2006 Italian football scandal and, as a result, was also relegated.

Giannichedda stayed with Juve for 2006–07, nonetheless. In that season, where the Serie B championship was conquered, he was coached by one of his idols, Didier Deschamps.

Giannichedda retired in June 2008 at nearly 34 years of age, after one unassuming campaign with Livorno, featuring in less than a quarter of the matches and suffering top flight relegation.

== International career ==
Giannichedda gained three caps for Italy in 1999, under manager Dino Zoff. His debut came on 31 March, in a 1–1 home draw against Belarus for the UEFA Euro 2000 qualifiers.

Giannichedda also represented the country at under-23 level in the 1997 Mediterranean Games, which were held on home soil, winning the gold medal.

== Style of play ==
A holding midfielder, Giannichedda was known for his ball-winning skills, tactical awareness, and ability to regain possession and help transition play into attack. His style of play occasionally resulted in fouls and disciplinary bookings.

== Post-retirement ==
In May 2011, he was awarded a director of football licence and, in July 2013, started acted as assistant to Alberigo Evani at the Italy under-20s team; the following year, he obtained a UEFA Pro Licence.

Giannichedda was appointed as manager for Racing Roma in July 2016. But, on 3 April 2017, it was announced by Racing Roma that Giannichedda suddenly had said to them that he wanted to stop, so the club was forced to fire him. It was a rather strange situation, because he, following the club, didn't say goodbye to anyone but disappeared into the blue.

In July 2018, he was unveiled as new head coach of Serie C club Pro Piacenza. He was fired by Pro Piacenza on 12 November 2018, with the team in relegation zone.

On 27 May 2019, Giannichedda was confirmed as the manager of Serie D club Aprilia. However, after only one month, he left the club by mutual agreement. In July 2019, he was named as the new head coach of the Italian Lega Nazionale Dilettanti amateur representative teams at Under-19 and Under-18 level.

== Honours ==
Udinese

- UEFA Intertoto Cup: 2000

Lazio

- Coppa Italia: 2003–04
- Supercoppa Italiana: Runner-up 2004

Juventus

- Serie B: 2006–07
- Supercoppa Italiana: Runner-up 2005

Italy

- Mediterranean Games: 1997
