= Gianluca Zambrotta =

Italian footballer (born 1977)

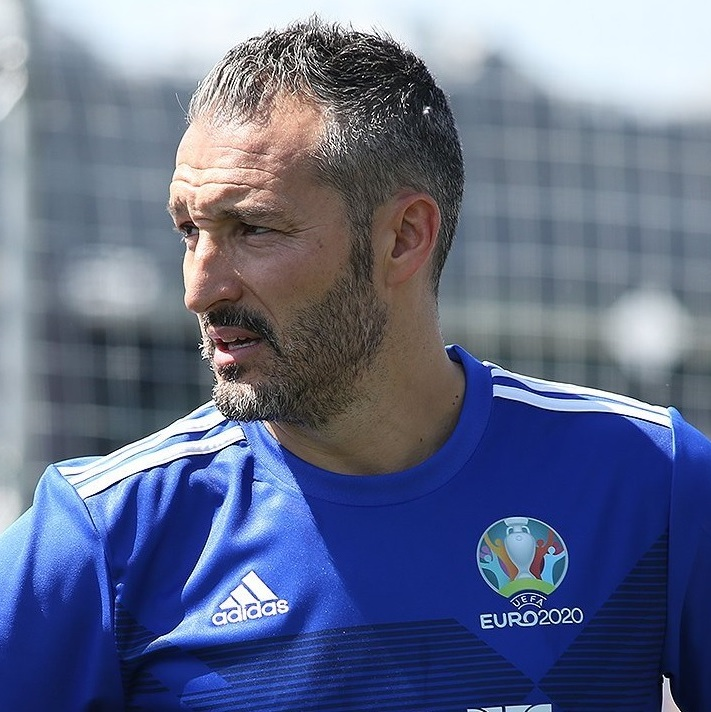
- Zambrotta in 2019

Personal information
- Full name: Gianluca Zambrotta
- Date of birth: 19 February 1977 (age 49)
- Place of birth: Como, Italy
- Height: 1.81 m (5 ft 11 in)
- Positions: Full-back; wing-back

Youth career
- 1992–1994: Como

Senior career*
Years	Team	Apps	(Gls)
1994–1997	Como	48	(6)
1997–1999	Bari	59	(6)
1999–2006	Juventus	217	(7)
2006–2008	Barcelona	58	(3)
2008–2012	AC Milan	80	(2)
2013–2014	Chiasso	10	(2)
Total		472	(26)

International career
1998–2000	Italy U21	13	(1)
1999–2010	Italy	98	(2)

Managerial career
- 2013: Chiasso (assistant)
- 2013–2015: Chiasso
- 2016: Delhi Dynamos
- 2017–2018: Jiangsu Suning (assistant)
Medal record
Men's football
Representing Italy
FIFA World Cup
Winner	2006 Germany
UEFA European Championship
Runner-up	2000 Belgium-Netherlands
- * Club domestic league appearances and goals

Gianluca Zambrotta Ufficiale OMRI (Italian pronunciation: [dʒanˈluːka ddzamˈbrɔtta]; born 19 February 1977) is an Italian former professional footballer who played as a full-back or as a wide midfielder, on both the left and right wings.

Throughout his career, Zambrotta played for several different Italian clubs. He began his career with local club Como in 1994, and gained prominence while playing for Bari, which earned him a transfer to Juventus in 1999. During his seven seasons with the club, he won two consecutive Serie A and Supercoppa Italiana titles in 2002 and 2003, also reaching the 2003 UEFA Champions League final. He also later spent two relatively unsuccessful seasons with Barcelona between 2006 and 2008, where he won the 2006 Supercopa de España, before returning to Italy to play for AC Milan, where he won his third Serie A and Supercoppa Italiana titles in 2011. He ended his career after a season with Swiss club Chiasso in 2014, whom he later went on to coach.

At international level, Zambrotta won 100 caps for the Italy national team, playing at three FIFA World Cups, three UEFA European Championship, the 2009 FIFA Confederations Cup and the 2000 Summer Olympics. He was part of their side that reached the Euro 2000 final, and he was also selected to the Euro 2004 Team of the Tournament. He was most notably a key member of the starting lineup of the Italian squad that won the 2006 World Cup, and he was selected in the Team of the Tournament for his performances.

== Club career ==
=== Como ===
Of Campanian descent, Zambrotta began his professional career as a striker with his hometown club Como at age 17 in 1994. In his first season in Serie B, he played only one match. In 1995, however, Como were demoted to Serie C1 and Zambrotta started to play more regularly for the first team, as a winger or as a wide-midfielder. In the 1995–96 and 1996–97 seasons, he made 47 appearances and scored 6 goals, playing in Serie B and Serie C1.

=== Bari ===
In 1997, Zambrotta's Serie A career began when his great potential was spotted by Bari boss Eugenio Fascetti. Zambrotta was snapped up by Fascetti after Bari had won promotion to Serie A. He made his Serie A debut on 31 August 1997 in a 2–0 home defeat to Parma, and in his first year in the top flight, he played on the left wing and scored 2 goals in 27 appearances. In the 1998–99 season, following the departure of Nicola Ventola, Zambrotta exploded on to the scene. In matchday one, he scored the only goal of the match against Venezia after just nine minutes into the first half. Zambrotta continued to shine and was the key figure for Bari's surprise start to the campaign, demonstrating his technical attributes and tactical intelligence and versatility. On matchday seven, he scored the opening goal at the San Siro and helped Bari to win the game 3–2 against Internazionale.

On 10 February 1999, at age 22, the Italian under-21 international was rewarded by the coach of the senior team, Dino Zoff, for his displays. He earned his first cap in a 0–0 friendly against Norway in Pisa, Italy. He became the first player of Bari to play for the national side in 50 years. Throughout the 1998–99 season, he made 32 appearances and scored four goals. Halfway through this season, he was brought to Juventus, by Carlo Ancelotti for reported 30 million Italian lire (€15,493,707, but 3 million lire paid via Simone Perrotta's 50% rights) and would play in the black-and-white jersey starting the season after.

=== Juventus ===
After the transfer to Juventus on 1 July 1999, Zambrotta continued his upward momentum under manager Carlo Ancelotti. He made 32 league appearances with one goal in the first season he played for Juventus. On 14 May 2000, the last match day of the season, Juventus missed out on the 1999–2000 Scudetto, as they were defeated 1–0 away at Perugia in the heavy rain, while Lazio got the three points at home by beating Reggina 3–0, and overcame Juventus by a single point. Zambrotta was brought on in the second half in that game and was later given a red card by the referee, Pierluigi Collina. In his second season for Juventus, 2000–01, Zambrotta made 29 league appearances and scored three goals, but Juventus finished once again in second place in Serie A, behind Roma. Zambrotta won his first Scudetto in the 2001–02 season, while he made 32 league appearances and scored one goal during the season, also reaching the 2002 Coppa Italia final with the club. After Zambrotta suffered an injury in the game against South Korea during the 2002 World Cup, he missed the beginning of the 2002–03 Serie A campaign. During his absence, the new signing of Mauro Camoranesi took his place on the right wing and was in superb form. This prompted then coach, Marcello Lippi, to switch Zambrotta to the left-back when he returned to action. Zambrotta adapted to his new position very quickly and performed particularly well, demonstrating his pace, stamina, work-rate, technical ability, his tactical intelligence and versatility, as well as his ability to contribute both offensively and defensively.

Zambrotta remained a regular first team player as Juventus won their second consecutive Scudetto and reached the Champions League final, in which they were defeated by AC Milan in a penalty shoot-out after a goalless draw. The following season, Juventus avenged the defeat by beating Milan to the 2003 Supercoppa Italiana on penalties, and also reached the 2004 Coppa Italia final, although they failed to retain their league title or progress in Europe. Zambrotta won four Scudetti with Juventus, making a total of 217 league appearances and scoring seven goals in six seasons. In the 2005–06 season, following the injury of Jonathan Zebina, as well as the arrival of Giorgio Chiellini and his successful switch with the national team, Zambrotta was again switched to the right-back. Since then, Zambrotta switched between right and left-fullback or wingback positions frequently throughout the season. In 2005, Zambrotta extended his contract to 2010 but, following Juventus' relegation to Serie B due to the 2006 Italian football scandal (calciopoli), as well as the revocation of their 2004–05 and 2005–06 Serie A titles under Fabio Capello, he decided to leave the club in the summer of 2006, with Milan, Chelsea, Real Madrid and Barcelona widely tipped to sign him. He was eventually transferred to Barcelona for €14 million.

Zambrotta signed a four-year contract with Barça, where he joined Juventus teammate Lilian Thuram, who also left the club. During his seven-year tenure with Juve, Zambrotta formed one of the best teams in the world at the time, as well as one of the world's most feared defenses. He formed defensive partnerships with the likes of Mark Iuliano, Paolo Montero, Ciro Ferrara, Thuram, Jonathan Zebina, Nicola Legrottaglie, Alessandro Birindelli, Fabio Cannavaro and Giorgio Chiellini. Overall, he made 297 appearances for Juventus, scoring ten goals.

=== Barcelona ===
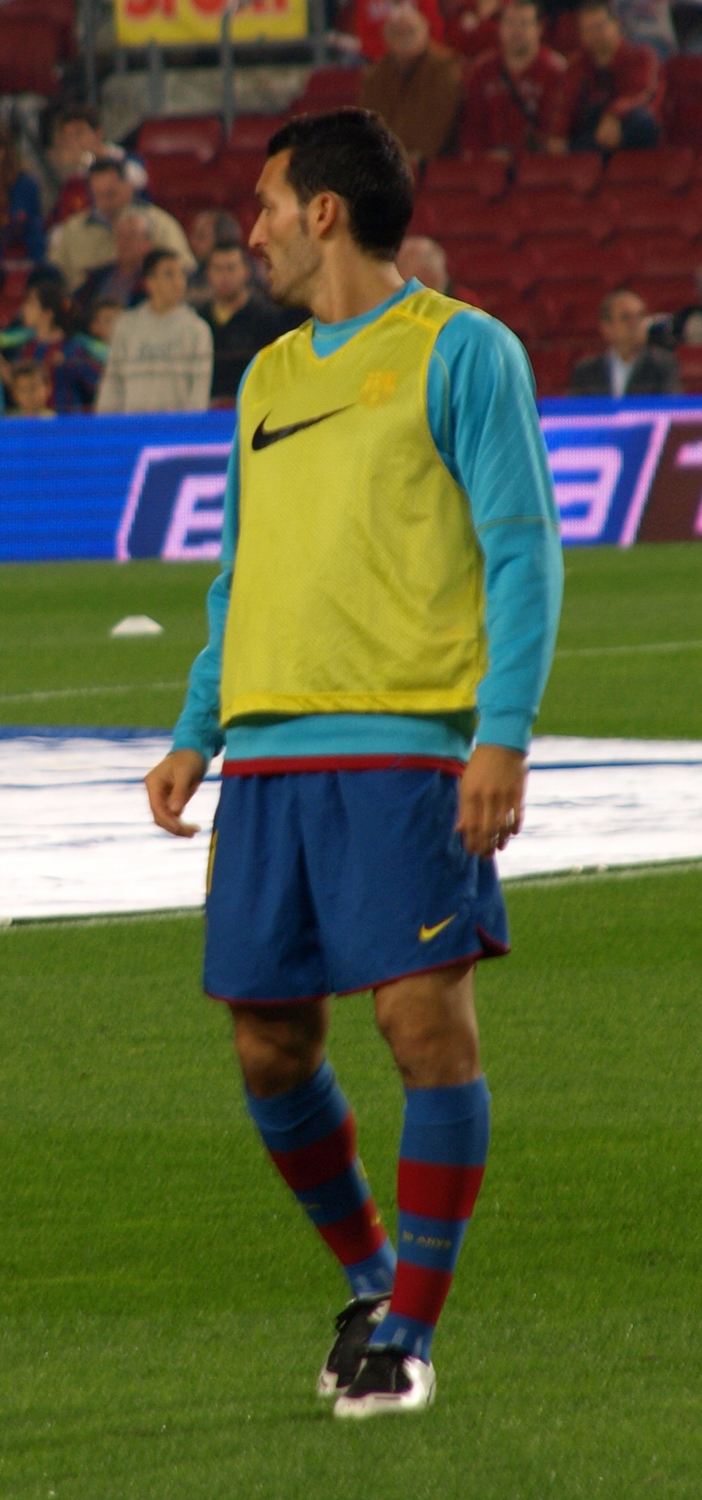
Zambrotta training with Barcelona

On 4 August 2006, after his holiday following the 2006 World Cup, Zambrotta reported to his new club Barcelona for the first time in Los Angeles, where Barça were staying for their pre-season tour in North America. He trained with his new teammates and made his debut in the final match of the tour, on 12 August against the New York Red Bulls. Zambrotta's official debut in Barça shirt was on 17 August against local rivals Espanyol in the first leg of the Supercopa de España. On 17 March 2007, he scored his first goal in the league game against Recreativo de Huelva. He also scored goals in matches against Atlético Madrid at the Vicente Calderón Stadium (Atlético's record largest home loss, 0–6) and Gimnàstic de Tarragona. He is well remembered by his performance against Manchester United in the semi-final return clash – he marked perfectly the future Ballon d'Or winner Cristiano Ronaldo all game, but Barcelona lost the match due to Paul Scholes' long-range effort that decided the match and the two-legged tie itself. In two seasons with the club, Zambrotta made 58 league appearances, scoring three goals, before his return to Italy. He was heavily tipped to join Milan or return to former club Juventus.

=== AC Milan ===
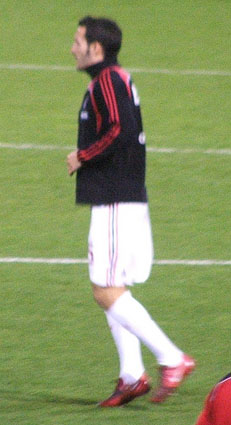
Zambrotta warming up with AC Milan prior to an UEFA Cup match

On 31 May 2008, Zambrotta signed a three-year contract with Milan. The club paid €9 million to Barcelona, with a potential €2 million added on depending on Milan's performance in the Champions League, for his services. Zambrotta would reportedly be earning €4 million per year. His move forced Milan right back Massimo Oddo to be loaned out to Bayern Munich for more chances to play regularly.

On 21 September 2008, Zambrotta scored his first goal for Milan, from 31 metres out, in the league game against Lazio. In the 2008–09 season, Zambrotta played more games than any other Milan player. In the 2009–10 season, Zambrotta mainly played at left back, competing with Luca Antonini for a starting spot, while the emerged star Ignazio Abate consolidated the right back position as his own.

For the 2010–11 season, Zambrotta was more versatile than before and often used as a utility. New coach Massimiliano Allegri also preferred Abate for the right back position while Zambrotta alternated between starting at left back and covering for Abate at right back. Nevertheless, he made 20 appearances in all competitions playing an important role in Milan's 18th Scudetto win. Later that year, he won the Serie A title with Milan, as well as the Supercoppa Italiana.

Zambrotta renewed his expiring contract for another year, keeping him a Milan player until at least the summer of 2012.

Milan decided not to renew the contracts of several of their veteran players and Zambrotta was one of those along with Filippo Inzaghi, Mark van Bommel, Alessandro Nesta and Gennaro Gattuso. He played his final game for Milan against Novara on 13 May 2012.

=== Chiasso ===
After becoming a free agent, in December 2012 Zambrotta began training with his hometown club Como while he was waiting to receive offers from other clubs; Zambrotta had previously been named the club's honorary president in 2007. In 2013, he began to work on obtaining his UEFA Pro Coaching Licence in Coverciano, Florence.

On 19 July 2013, Zambrotta signed with Swiss club Chiasso, with an option to become a player-assistant manager during his second season with the club, under Ernestino Ramella. He made his debut with the team on 11 August 2013, in a 0–0 draw against Lugano, in the 2013–14 Swiss Challenge League. On 27 November, following the dismissal of manager Ryszard Komornicki, with the club in last place, Zambrotta was named player-manager; at the end of the season, he helped Chiasso avoid relegation on 14 May 2014, also announcing the end of his playing career. He continued to manage Chiasso the following season, but was eventually sacked on 6 April 2015.

== International career ==
=== Under-21 and early senior career ===
Soon after Zambrotta was brought to Serie A, he gained the attention of the Italy national side. He was selected to play for the Italy under-21 national team for the first time on 25 March 1998 against Malta. In his second game for the U21, against Wales on 22 April 1998, he scored the second goal for Italy on the 43rd minute and helped Italy to win 2–1. In 1998, he played in all six games of the Italy U21 while they won five of them and drew the last one against Spain.

It was on tour with the under-21 team that Zambrotta earned the nickname "the Mermaid" for his allegedly spending one hour every night in front of the mirror grooming at his now trademark goatee. After some impressive displays for the U21 and an excellent start to the 1998–99 season, Zambrotta earned his first senior cap on 10 February 1999, nine days before his 22nd birthday, in an 0–0 friendly draw with Norway.

Due to his consistent performances, he featured in Italy's senior squad at UEFA Euro 2000 under manager Dino Zoff, in which they reached the final, with Zambrotta making four appearances throughout the tournament. Zambrotta missed out on Italy's defeat at the hands of the defending world champions France in the final, however, after being sent off in the semi-final match against co-hosts Netherlands following a double booking.

Zambrotta played for the under-21 side for the 2000 Olympic Games in September. He started in the games against Australia and Honduras, which Italy won 1–0 and 3–1 respectively. Since they had already qualified for the quarter-finals, the coach put Zambrotta on the bench for the last game against Nigeria and substituted him on at the 80th minute. This would be the last time he played for the U21 national team, with a total of 13 U21-caps. Italy were defeated by Spain, who would go on to win the silver medal, by one goal in the quarter-final.

Under new manager Giovanni Trapattoni, Zambrotta also represented the Italy senior side at the 2002 World Cup, where Italy were controversially eliminated in the round of 16 by co-hosts South Korea, on a golden goal; during the second round defeat, Zambrotta was forced off the pitch with an injury following a hard, two-footed foul from Choi Jin-cheul in the second half of regulation time, and was replaced by Angelo Di Livio.

=== Euro 2004 ===
In 2003, after the retirement of Paolo Maldini from the national team and a successful switch to left-back with Juventus, Zambrotta became the first choice for this position in the national team. On 30 May 2004, Zambrotta scored his first ever international goal in a warm-up against Tunisia. A Bernardo Corradi header was flapped out for Zambrotta's fierce volley into the roof of the net in the 89th minute while Italy won the game by 4–0. In Euro 2004, although the performance of Italy was largely disappointing and the team was eliminated at the group stage, Zambrotta was one of the few Italian players to be praised for his performances, and was elected to be part of the Team of the Tournament. In Italy's final group match against Bulgaria, which ended in a 2–1 victory the Italians, he was involved in both of his team's goals, setting up Antonio Cassano's injury time winner, although Italy finished third in their group on direct encounters, following a three-way five point tie with Sweden and Denmark.

=== 2006 World Cup ===
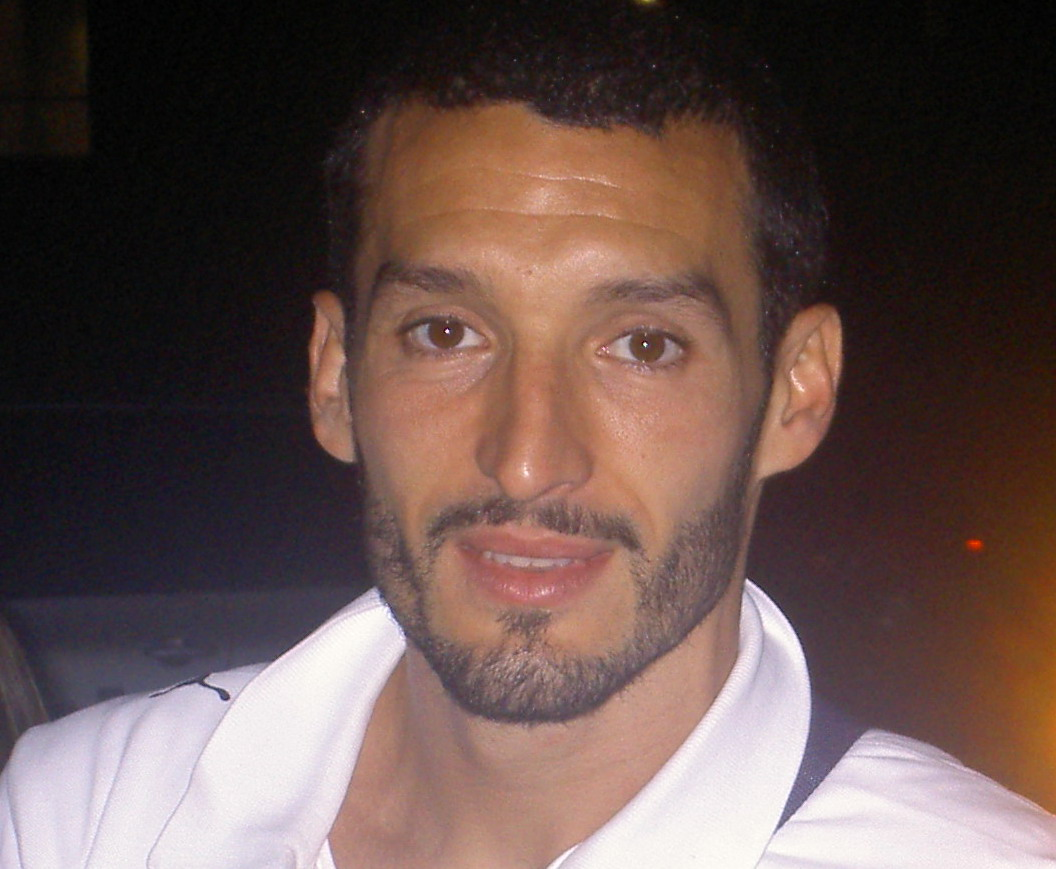
Zambrotta during the 2006 World Cup

New coach Marcello Lippi, who had just resigned as the Juventus manager where he had managed Zambrotta, moved him to right-back. He became a core player in the 2006 World Cup qualifying campaign, featuring in eight of the ten matches to help Italy qualify as group winners. On 15 May 2006, he was chosen as one of the 23 players to participate in the finals in Germany.

During final preparations, Zambrotta injured his left thigh during a training match at the national team's training base at Coverciano on 28 May 2006. He picked up the injury in a training match against amateur team San Giminiano. This brought certain fears for the Italian squad and Lippi decided to keep Daniele Bonera on stand-by in case Zambrotta could not recover in time. Medical ultrasonography scans on Zambrotta's thigh in the final days before Italy's first group match revealed that he would only miss the opening game against Ghana.

Zambrotta made his tournament debut in the second group match against the United States as a left-back, the match ending in a 1–1 draw. In their last group match, against the Czech Republic on 22 June, Italy needed only a draw to qualify from the group. Zambrotta was moved to the right-back position as his team won the match 2–0 and advanced as group winners.

During Italy's closely fought 1–0 over Australia in the round of 16, Zambrotta received a booking in the 91st minute. In the quarter-final on 30 June, Italy defeated Ukraine 3–0, with Zambrotta scoring the opening goal after six minutes with a left-footed long-range shot after a one-two with Francesco Totti. This was his second goal for his country. Zambrotta's outstanding performance continued as he saved his team by a goal-line clearance in the 58th minute. After Lippi made some substitutions, Zambrotta was pushed up to a left midfield position. He immediately showed the effect of this position switch. In the 69th minute, he dribbled down the left flank into the edge of the penalty area and passed the ball across to Luca Toni to score his second goal of the match.

Zambrotta also participated in Italy's semi-final victory over the host nation, Germany, hitting the cross-bar in extra time, and he also played in Italy's victorious final victory over France.

Throughout the tournament, Zambrotta completed 213 passes. His ability to play in multiple positions on either flank contributed to the tactical flexibility of the Italian squad, and earned him a place in the 23-man 2006 World Cup All-Star squad.

=== Euro 2008 ===
Zambrotta was selected by new manager Roberto Donadoni to represent Italy at Euro 2008 in Austria and Switzerland. He played in all Italy's games in the tournament. In the first group stage match, Italy faced the Netherlands; Zambrotta was not at his best in a match as Italy fell 3–0. In the next match, against Romania, Zambrotta made a defensive error that was followed by Romania's 1–0 goal, scored by Adrian Mutu. Christian Panucci, however, scored just one minute later to tie the match at 1–1. Close to the end of the match, Romania was awarded a penalty, but Italy goalkeeper Gianluigi Buffon saved Mutu's shot, securing a 1–1 draw. Italy defeated France 2–0 in their final group match to advance to the quarter-finals. In the quarter-finals, Italy fell to Spain on penalties (4–2) after a 0–0 draw, knocking them out of the tournament.

=== 2009 Confederations Cup ===
Late in 2008, World Cup-winning coach Marcello Lippi returned to coach of Italy, selecting Zambrotta for the 2009 FIFA Confederations Cup. Italy, however, failed to progress past the first round, eliminated on goal differential after finishing level on points with the United States.

=== 2010 World Cup ===
Zambrotta was selected for the 2010 World Cup by Lippi. He made his first appearance as Italy's captain in a 1–1 away draw against Switzerland in a pre-World Cup friendly, on 5 June 2010. Despite the Italian team's struggles throughout the tournament, Zambrotta was one of his nation's strongest performers in the group stage. Italy earned 1–1 draws in their first two games against Paraguay and New Zealand, collecting two points, and subsequently needing a draw in their final group match against Slovakia in order to proceed the second round. Italy lost the match 3–2, and were eliminated from the tournament in the first round.

=== Last international matches ===
After the World Cup, Lippi resigned, while Cesare Prandelli was named as his replacement. In the first matches under Prandelli, Zambrotta was largely omitted from the squad, but he returned to play in several Euro 2012 qualifiers. Zambrotta played his last match in Italy colours in a European qualifier against Serbia in Genoa on 12 October 2010, as his team's captain. The match was initially delayed, and eventually abandoned after only six minutes due to crowd trouble, with the score at 0–0, after some of the Serbian fans had thrown flares onto the pitch; Italy were later handed a 3–0 victory by UEFA. This match was Zambrotta's 100th and final Italy cap, making him his nation's eighth-most capped player of all time. In total, he scored two goals for Italy between 1999 and 2010.

== Style of play ==
Zambrotta is regarded by pundits as one of Italy's greatest attacking full-backs/wing-backs. Although naturally right-footed, he was an ambidextrous player who excelled both at offensive and defensive play, which made him tactically versatile, allowing him to be deployed on the left as well as on the right side of the pitch, as a full-back or wing-back in a 4 or 5-man defence, or even as a winger or wide midfielder, a position in which he was often played earlier on in his career. His main attributes were his pace, marking ability, tackling, strength, intelligence, tenacity, discipline, and stamina, which allowed him to make surging, overlapping attacking runs with the ball up the flank after winning back possession. A dynamic, tenacious, athletic, and hard-working player, he was also gifted with good technique and ball skills, as well as an excellent crossing ability and a powerful shot from outside the area, which enabled him to contribute to his team's offensive plays. He was also deployed as an offensive-minded central midfielder on occasion, known as the mezzala role in Italian football jargon.

== Managerial career ==
After his time as Chiasso's head coach, Zambrotta was appointed as the manager of Indian Super League club Delhi Dynamos in late June 2016, while his former international teammate Simone Barone was appointed as his assistant.

On 14 June 2017, Delhi Dynamos announced that they had mutually terminated their contract with Zambrotta as he prepared to take the role of assistant manager at CSL side Jiangsu Suning.

== Personal life ==
Zambrotta was born in Como, but his paternal grandfather was from Caserta.

As of 2005, Zambrotta is married to Valentina Liguori, an Italian model; they announced the birth of their first son, Riccardo, in August 2012.

Zambrotta was named honorary president of his hometown club Como in 2007.

In 2012, Zambrotta worked as a pundit for the Swiss-Italian broadcasting station RSI.

In 2014, Zambrotta opened a fitness complex in his hometown of Como, called the Eracle Sports Centre.

In 2015, Zambrotta took part in and won the RAI 2 reality television game show Monte Bianco – Sfida verticale.

Zambrotta features in EA Sports' football video game FIFA 20 as one of the new Ultimate Team Icons.

== Career statistics ==
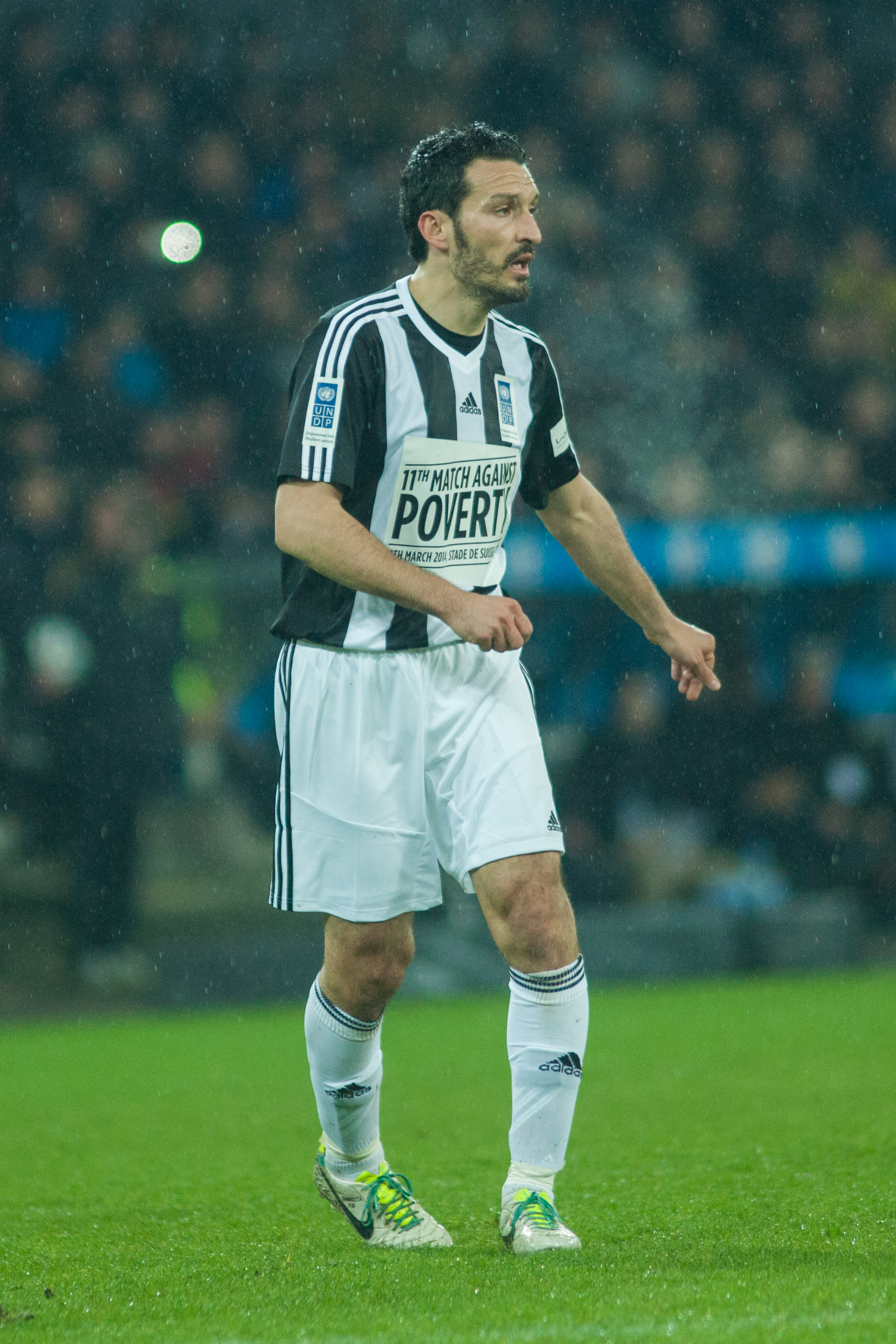
Zambrotta in the Match Against Poverty in Bern, March 2014

=== Club ===
Appearances and goals by club, season and competition
Club	Season	League			National cup		Continental		Other		Total	
Club	Season	Division	Apps	Goals	Apps	Goals	Apps	Goals	Apps	Goals	Apps	Goals
Como	1994–95	Serie B	1	0	0	0	–		–		1	0
Como	1995–96	Serie C1	14	2	1	0	–		–		15	2
Como	1996–97	Serie C1	33	4	1	0	–		–		34	4
Como	Total		48	6	2	0	–		–		50	6
Bari	1997–98	Serie A	27	2	2	2	–		–		29	4
Bari	1998–99	Serie A	32	4	4	0	–		–		36	4
Bari	Total		59	6	6	2	–		–		65	8
Juventus	1999–2000	Serie A	32	1	2	0	12 (Note: Appearances in UEFA Cup)	2	–		45	3
Juventus	2000–01	Serie A	29	3	0	0	0	0	–		29	3
Juventus	2001–02	Serie A	32	1	6	1	9 (Note: Appearances in UEFA Champions League)	0	–		47	2
Juventus	2002–03	Serie A	26	1	3	0	13	0	0	0	42	1
Juventus	2003–04	Serie A	30	1	6	0	5	0	1 (Note: Appearance in Supercoppa Italiana)	0	42	1
Juventus	2004–05	Serie A	36	0	0	0	12	0	–		48	0
Juventus	2005–06	Serie A	32	0	2	0	8	0	1	0	43	0
Juventus	Total		217	7	19	1	59	2	2	0	296	10
Barcelona	2006–07	La Liga	29	3	5	0	6	0	2 (Note: One appearance in Supercopa de España, one appearance in FIFA Club World Cup)	0	42	3
Barcelona	2007–08	La Liga	29	0	5	0	6	0	–		40	0
Barcelona	Total		58	3	10	0	12	0	2	0	82	3
AC Milan	2008–09	Serie A	34	1	1	0	6	0	–		41	1
AC Milan	2009–10	Serie A	24	0	1	0	5	0	–		30	0
AC Milan	2010–11	Serie A	15	0	1	0	5	0	–		21	0
AC Milan	2011–12	Serie A	7	1	1	0	3	0	1	0	12	1
AC Milan	Total		80	2	4	0	19	0	1	0	104	2
Career total			459	24	41	3	88	2	5	0	592	29

=== International ===
Appearances and goals by national team and year
National team	Year	Apps	Goals
Italy	1999	3	0
Italy	2000	8	0
Italy	2001	8	0
Italy	2002	8	0
Italy	2003	8	0
Italy	2004	10	1
Italy	2005	7	0
Italy	2006	10	1
Italy	2007	6	0
Italy	2008	12	0
Italy	2009	12	0
Italy	2010	6	0
Total		98	2

Scores and results list Italy's goal tally first, score column indicates score after each Zambrotta goal.

List of international goals scored by Gianluca Zambrotta
No.	Date	Venue	Opponent	Score	Result	Competition
1	30 May 2004	Stade Olympique de Radès, Radès, Tunisia	Tunisia	4–0	4–0	Friendly
2	30 June 2006	Volksparkstadion, Hamburg, Germany	Ukraine	1–0	3–0	2006 FIFA World Cup

== Managerial statistics ==
As of 2 December 2016

Team	From	To	Record				
Team	From	To	G	W	D	L	Win %
Chiasso	27 November 2013	6 April 2015	48	13	13	22	27.08
Delhi Dynamos	2016	2016	18	7	6	5	38.89
Total			64	19	19	26	29.69

== Honours ==
Juventus

- Serie A: 2001–02, 2002–03
- Supercoppa Italiana: 2003
- UEFA Intertoto Cup: 1999
- UEFA Champions League runner-up: 2002-03

Barcelona

- Supercopa de España: 2006

AC Milan

- Serie A: 2010–11
- Supercoppa Italiana: 2011

Italy

- FIFA World Cup: 2006
- UEFA European Championship runner-up: 2000

Individual

- UEFA Euro 2004: Team of the Tournament
- UEFA Team of the Year: 2006
- FIFPro World XI: 2006
- 2006 FIFA World Cup: All-Star Team

Orders

- 5th Class / Knight: Cavaliere Ordine al Merito della Repubblica Italiana: 2000

- 4th Class / Officer: Ufficiale Ordine al Merito della Repubblica Italiana: 2006

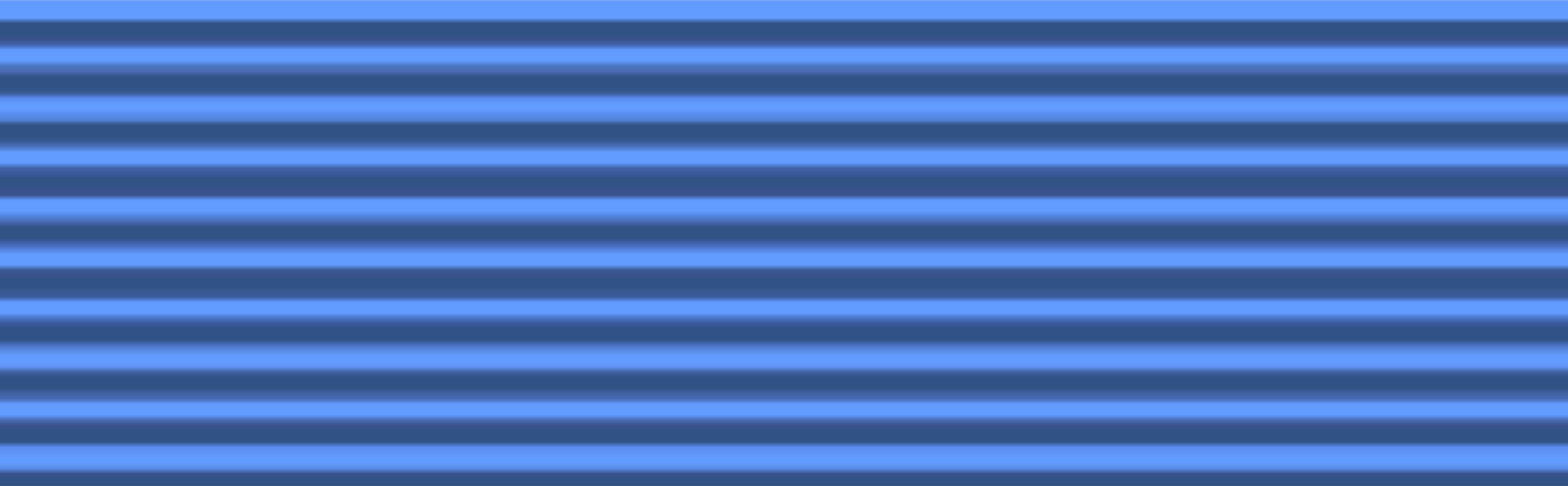
- CONI: Golden Collar of Sports Merit: Collare d'Oro al Merito Sportivo: 2006
