= 1995–96 Albacete Balompié season =

Albacete Balompié
1995–96 season
- President: José Ramón Remiro Brotóns
- Manager: Benito Floro (to 10 March); Iñaki Sáez (from 16 March)
- Stadium: Carlos Belmonte
- La Liga: 20th (relegated via playoff)
- Copa del Rey: First round
- Top goalscorer: League: Nenad Bjelica (13); All: Nenad Bjelica (13)

The 1995–96 season was the 55th season in Albacete Balompié's history.

== Squad ==
Retrieved on 12 January 2021

Note: Flags indicate national team as defined under FIFA eligibility rules; some limited exceptions apply. Players may hold more than one non-FIFA nationality.

No.	Pos.	Nation	Player
1	GK	ESP	Juan Carlos Balaguer
2	DF	ESP	Mario Romero
3	DF	ESP	Sotero López
4	DF	ESP	Albert Tomàs
5	DF	URU	Alejandro González
5	DF	YUG	Petar Vasiljević
6	DF	ESP	Juan José Maqueda
7	MF	ESP	Manolo Salvador
8	FW	ESP	Xavier Escaich
9	FW	AZE	Vali Gasimov
10	MF	URU	José Luis Zalazar
11	FW	ESP	Javi Luke
11	FW	ESP	Pedro Riesco (on loan from Deportivo La Coruña)
12	MF	ESP	Jesús Muñoz
13	GK	ESP	Fernando Marcos
14	DF	ESP	Coco
15	DF	ESP	Alejandro Sánchez

No.	Pos.	Nation	Player
16	FW	ESP	José Luis Garzón
17	DF	ESP	José Maria Ortega
18	MF	ESP	Juan Antonio Chesa
19	FW	ESP	Luna
20	MF	CRO	Nenad Bjelica
21	MF	ESP	Emilio
22	GK	RUS	Yevgeni Plotnikov
23	DF	ESP	Juli Romero
24	DF	ESP	Fernando Cebrián
26	MF	ESP	Ángel Brau
27	MF	ESP	Alberto Monteagudo
28	DF	ESP	José Ángel Moreno
29	DF	ESP	José Carlos Soria
33	MF	ESP	Josico
—	GK	ESP	Alejandro
—	DF	ESP	Javier Oliete
—	MF	ESP	Juan Ángel Ramos

=== Transfers ===
==== In ====
#	Pos	Player	From	Notes
Summer
6	DF	(Spain) Juan José Maqueda	(Spain) Valencia	
8	FW	(Spain) Xavier Escaich	(Spain) Barcelona	
9	FW	(Azerbaijan) Vali Gasimov	(Spain) Real Betis	
11	FW	(Spain) Javi Luke	(Spain) Athletic Bilbao	
15	DF	(Spain) Alejandro Sánchez	(Spain) Atlético Madrid	
16	FW	(Spain) José Luis Garzón	(Spain) Sabadell	
18	MF	(Spain) Juan Antonio Chesa	(Spain) Hellín Deportivo	
21	MF	(Spain) Emilio	(Spain) Sporting de Gijón	
33	MF	(Spain) Josico	(Spain) Hellín Deportivo	
Winter
5	DF	(Federal Republic of Yugoslavia) Petar Vasiljević	(Spain) Osasuna	
11	FW	(Spain) Pedro Riesco	(Spain) Deportivo La Coruña	Loan
17	DF	(Spain) José Maria Ortega	(Spain) Almería	
19	FW	(Spain) Luna	(Spain) Almería	
22	GK	(Russia) Yevgeni Plotnikov	(Russia) CSKA Moscow	

==== Out ====
#	Pos	Player	To	Notes
Summer
	GK	(Spain) José Francisco Molina	(Spain) Atlético Madrid	
	DF	(Spain) Esteve Fradera	(Spain) Real Mallorca	
	DF	(Spain) Magín	(Spain) Elche	
	DF	(Spain) Santi	(Spain) Atlético Madrid	
	DF	(Spain) Alejandro Rodríguez	(Spain) Gimnàstic de Tarragona	
	MF	(Spain) Pedro Cordero	(Spain) Badajoz	
	MF	(Spain) Óscar García	(Spain) Barcelona	Loan return
	MF	(Spain) Josep Sala	(Spain) Badajoz	
	FW	(Bulgaria) Ivaylo Andonov	(Germany) Arminia Bielefeld	
	FW	(Spain) Antonio	(Spain) Extremadura	
	FW	(Argentina) Oscar Dertycia	(Argentina) Belgrano	
	FW	(Spain) Gregorio Fonseca	(Spain) Real Valladolid	
	FW	(Spain) Fernando Morientes	(Spain) Real Zaragoza	
Winter
5	DF	(Uruguay) Alejandro González	(Uruguay) Nacional	
16	FW	(Spain) José Luis Garzón	(Spain) Hércules	
21	MF	(Spain) Emilio	(Spain) Atlético Marbella	
27	MF	(Spain) Alberto Monteagudo	(Spain) L'Hospitalet	
	DF	(Spain) Javier Oliete	(Spain) Villarreal	

== Squad stats ==
Last updated on 29 December 2020.

No.	Pos	Nat	Player	Total		La Liga		La Liga playoff		Copa del Rey	
No.	Pos	Nat	Player	Apps	Goals	Apps	Goals	Apps	Goals	Apps	Goals
1	GK	(Spain) ESP	Juan Carlos Balaguer	19	0	17	0	0	0	2	0
2	DF	(Spain) ESP	Mario Romero	18	1	10+5	1	0+1	0	1+1	0
3	DF	(Spain) ESP	Sotero López	23	0	14+7	0	0	0	2	0
4	DF	(Spain) ESP	Albert Tomàs	27	0	27	0	0	0	0	0
5	DF	(Federal Republic of Yugoslavia) YUG	Petar Vasiljević	24	0	21+1	0	2	0	0	0
6	DF	(Spain) ESP	Juan José Maqueda	24	1	17+3	1	2	0	2	0
7	MF	(Spain) ESP	Manolo Salvador	40	0	35+2	0	2	0	1	0
8	FW	(Spain) ESP	Xavier Escaich	34	3	11+21	3	1	0	1	0
9	FW	(Azerbaijan) AZE	Vali Gasimov	25	4	16+6	4	0+2	0	1	0
10	MF	(Uruguay) URU	José Luis Zalazar	41	11	37+1	11	2	0	1	0
11	FW	(Spain) ESP	Pedro Riesco	27	4	21+4	4	1+1	0	0	0
12	MF	(Spain) ESP	Jesús Muñoz	37	0	26+9	0	1	0	0+1	0
13	GK	(Spain) ESP	Fernando Marcos	27	0	24+1	0	2	0	0	0
14	DF	(Spain) ESP	Coco	38	2	30+4	2	2	0	2	0
15	DF	(Spain) ESP	Alejandro Sánchez	31	1	31	1	0	0	0	0
17	DF	(Spain) ESP	José Maria Ortega	20	1	13+5	1	2	0	0	0
18	MF	(Spain) ESP	Juan Antonio Chesa	13	0	1+11	0	0+1	0	0	0
19	FW	(Spain) ESP	Luna	27	10	24+1	10	2	0	0	0
20	MF	(Croatia) CRO	Nenad Bjelica	43	13	39+1	13	1+1	0	1	0
22	GK	(Russia) RUS	Yevgeni Plotnikov	1	0	1	0	0	0	0	0
23	DF	(Spain) ESP	Juli Romero	17	0	5+10	0	0	0	2	0
24	DF	(Spain) ESP	Fernando Cebrián	5	0	0+4	0	0	0	0+1	0
26	MF	(Spain) ESP	Ángel Brau	4	0	4	0	0	0	0	0
28	DF	(Spain) ESP	José Ángel Moreno	9	0	0+7	0	0	0	1+1	0
29	DF	(Spain) ESP	José Carlos Soria	4	0	3	0	0	0	0+1	0
33	MF	(Spain) ESP	Josico	30	2	28	2	2	0	0	0
	GK	(Spain) ESP	Alejandro	0	0	0	0	0	0	0	0
	MF	(Spain) ESP	Juan Ángel Ramos	0	0	0	0	0	0	0	0
Players who have left the club after the start of the season:
5	DF	(Uruguay) URU	Alejandro González	2	0	1	0	0	0	1	0
11	FW	(Spain) ESP	Javi Luke	15	0	4+10	0	0	0	1	0
16	FW	(Spain) ESP	José Luis Garzón	2	1	0+1	0	0	0	1	1
21	MF	(Spain) ESP	Emilio	3	0	0+1	0	0	0	1+1	0
27	MF	(Spain) ESP	Alberto Monteagudo	5	0	2+2	0	0	0	1	0
	DF	(Spain) ESP	Javier Oliete	0	0	0	0	0	0	0	0

== Competitions ==
=== Overall ===
Competition	Final position
La Liga	20th (relegated via playoff)
Copa del Rey	First round

=== La Liga ===
==== League table ====
Pos	Team	Pld	W	D	L	GF	GA	GD	Pts	Qualification or relegation
18	Sporting Gijón	42	13	7	22	51	60	−9	46	
19	Rayo Vallecano (O)	42	12	8	22	47	75	−28	44	Qualification for the relegation playoffs
20	Albacete (R)	42	10	12	20	55	81	−26	42 (Note: MÉR 1–1 ALB; ALB 2–0 MÉR)	Qualification for the relegation playoffs
21	Mérida (R)	42	10	12	20	37	62	−25	42	Relegation to the Segunda División
22	Salamanca (R)	42	8	9	25	53	82	−29	33	Relegation to the Segunda División

Source: LFP
Rules for classification: 1) points; 2) head-to-head points; 3) head-to-head goal difference; 4) head-to-head goals scored; 5) goal difference; 6) number of goals scored.
(O) Play-off winners; (R) Relegated

==== Matches ====
Win Draw Loss

Match	Opponent	Venue	Result
1	Sporting de Gijón	A	0–3
2	Sevilla	H	3–2
3	Espanyol	A	0–1
4	Celta Vigo	H	4–0
5	Deportivo La Coruña	A	0–5
6	Real Valladolid	H	4–2
7	Mérida	A	1–1
8	Real Zaragoza	H	0–1
9	Rayo Vallecano	A	0–2
10	Real Madrid	H	1–1
11	Real Oviedo	A	0–1
12	Real Betis	H	0–0
13	Barcelona	A	0–3
14	Valencia	H	1–3
15	Compostela	A	1–3
16	Salamanca	H	3–3
17	Tenerife	A	3–1
18	Athletic Bilbao	H	2–0
19	Real Sociedad	H	3–5
20	Racing Santander	A	5–5
21	Atlético Madrid	H	1–1

Match	Opponent	Venue	Result
22	Sporting de Gijón	H	1–3
23	Sevilla	A	1–1
24	Espanyol	H	0–0
25	Celta Vigo	A	2–2
26	Deportivo La Coruña	H	1–0
27	Real Valladolid	A	0–3
28	Mérida	H	2–0
29	Real Zaragoza	A	1–3
30	Rayo Vallecano	H	1–2
31	Real Madrid	A	0–2
32	Real Oviedo	H	0–1
33	Real Betis	A	3–2
34	Barcelona	H	0–1
35	Valencia	A	0–1
36	Compostela	H	2–1
37	Salamanca	A	4–2
38	Tenerife	H	0–0
39	Athletic Bilbao	A	2–2
40	Real Sociedad	A	1–8
41	Racing Santander	H	2–2
42	Atlético Madrid	A	0–2

==== Relegation playoff ====
Win Draw Loss

Opponent	Aggregate	Venue	First Leg	Venue	Second Leg
Extremadura	0–2	A	0–1	H	0–1

=== Copa del Rey ===
Win Draw Loss

Round	Opponent	Aggregate	Venue	First Leg	Venue	Second Leg
First round	Almería	1–5	A	1–4	H	0–1
