= 1993–94 Atlético Madrid season =

63rd season in existence of Atlético Madrid

Atlético Madrid
1993–94 season
- President: Jesús Gil
- Head coach: Jair Pereira (to October); Ramón Heredia (October to November); Emilio Cruz (November to January); José Luis Romero (January to February); Iselín Santos Ovejero (February to March); Jorge D'Alessandro
- Stadium: Vicente Calderón
- La Liga: 12th
- Copa del Rey: Round of 16
- UEFA Cup: Second round
- Top goalscorer: League: Luis García (11); All: Luis García (16)
Home colours	Away colours

The 1993–94 season was Atlético Madrid's 63rd season since foundation in 1903 and the club's 59th season in La Liga, the top league of Spanish football. Atlético competed in La Liga, the Copa del Rey, and the UEFA Cup.

== Squad ==
Note: Flags indicate national team as defined under FIFA eligibility rules; some limited exceptions apply. Players may hold more than one non-FIFA nationality.

No.	Pos.	Nation	Player
—	GK	ESP	Diego Díaz
—	GK	ESP	Abel Resino
—	DF	ESP	Tomás Reñones
—	DF	ESP	Pizo Gómez
—	DF	ESP	Juanito
—	DF	ESP	Juanma
—	DF	ESP	Juanma López
—	DF	ESP	Pedro
—	DF	ESP	Roberto Solozábal
—	DF	ESP	Toni Muñoz
—	DF	ESP	Óscar Valles
—	MF	CIV	Serge Maguy

No.	Pos.	Nation	Player
—	MF	ESP	Jose Luis Perez Caminero
—	MF	BRA	Moacir
—	MF	ESP	Pirri
—	MF	ESP	Mami Quevedo
—	MF	ESP	José Ignacio Soler
—	MF	ESP	Juan Vizcaíno
—	FW	PAR	Miguel Ángel Benítez
—	FW	MEX	Luis García
—	FW	ESP	Kiko
—	FW	POL	Roman Kosecki
—	FW	ESP	Manolo
—	FW	ESP	Juan Sabas
—	FW	BRA	Mário Tilico

=== Transfers ===
In
Pos.	Name	from	Type
MF	Jose Luis Perez Caminero	Valladolid	
FW	Kiko	Cádiz CF	
FW	Roman Kosecki	Osasuna	
MF	Pirri	Real Oviedo	
MF	Mami Quevedo	Cádiz CF	
MF	Moacir	Corinthians	
FW	Mário Tilico	Atlético Marbella	

Out
Pos.	Name	To	Type
MF	Donato	Deportivo	
MF	Bernd Schuster	Bayer Leverkusen	
DF	Patxi Ferreira	Sevilla	loan
MF	Alfredo Santaelena	Deportivo	
DF	Carlos Aguilera	Tenerife	
MF	Antonio Orejuela	Rayo Vallecano	
MF	Gabriel Moya	Sevilla	
FW	José Luis Villarreal	River Plate	
FW	Jorge Rajado	Levante	
GK	Ángel Mejías	Talavera	
FW	Manolo Alfaro	Real Valladolid	Loan
FW	Vladan Lukić	Vojvodina	
MF	Antonio Acosta	Cádiz CF	Loan

==== Winter ====
In
Pos.	Name	from	Type
MF	José Ignacio Soler	Badajoz	

Out
Pos.	Name	To	Type
DF	Alejandro Sánchez	Atlético Marbella	

== Results ==
=== La Liga ===
==== League table ====
Pos	Team	Pld	W	D	L	GF	GA	GD	Pts
10	Tenerife	38	15	6	17	50	57	−7	36 (Note: TEN 2–1 RSO; RSO 2–1 TEN)
11	Real Sociedad	38	12	12	14	39	47	−8	36
12	Atlético Madrid	38	13	9	16	54	54	0	35 (Note: ATM: 5 pts; ALB: 4 pts; SPG: 3 pts)
13	Albacete	38	10	15	13	49	58	−9	35
14	Sporting Gijón	38	15	5	18	42	57	−15	35

Source: LFP
Rules for classification: 1) points; 2) head-to-head points; 3) head-to-head goal difference; 4) head-to-head goals scored; 5) goal difference; 6) number of goals scored.

==== Position by round ====
Round	1	2	3	4	5	6	7	8	9	10	11	12	13	14	15	16	17	18	19	20	21	22	23	24	25	26	27	28	29	30	31	32	33	34	35	36	37	38
Ground	A	H	H	A	H	A	H	A	H	A	H	A	H	A	H	A	H	A	H	H	A	A	H	A	H	A	H	A	H	A	H	A	H	A	H	A	H	A
Result	W	D	W	D	D	L	L	D	W	L	W	D	L	D	L	W	D	D	L	L	W	L	W	L	L	L	D	L	L	W	W	L	L	W	L	W	W	W
Position	8	6	4	5	6	9	10	10	8	12	10	12	11	10	11	10	10	11	12	13	12	14	13	14	14	15	16	17	17	15	15	15	17	15	16	14	14	12

Source: https://www.bdfutbol.com/en/t/t1992-9339.html?tab=partits
A = Away; H = Home; W = Win; D = Draw; L = Loss; = Leader, 1993–94 UEFA Champions League Group stage; = 1994–95 UEFA Cup First round; = 1993–94 Relegation playoff to 1994–95 Segunda Division; = 1994–95 Segunda Division; R = 1994–95 UEFA Cup Winners' Cup

==== Matches ====
Win Draw Loss

5 September 1993 1	Atletico	1–0	Logroñés	Madrid
	García 33'	Report		Stadium: Vicente Calderón Stadium; Referee: Alonso Gómez López

11 September 1993 2	Valencia	2–2	Atletico	Valencia
	Penev 26' (pen.); Mijatović 54'	Report	García 30'; Pirri 36'	Stadium: Mestalla Stadium; Referee: José Merino Gonzalez

19 September 1993 3	Atletico	3–2	Celta Vigo	Madrid
	Vizcaíno 24'; García 33'; Kiko 55'	Report	Gudelj 58' (pen.); Losada 88'	Stadium: Vicente Calderón Stadium; Referee: Miguel Marín López

25 September 1993 4	Sporting de Gijón	1–1	Atletico	Gijón
	Abelardo 27'	Report	Manolo 45'	Stadium: El Molinón; Referee: José Pérez Sánchez

2 October 1993 5	Atletico	0–0	Real Madrid	Madrid
		Report		Stadium: Vicente Calderón Stadium; Referee: Joaquín Urío Velázquez

6 October 1993 6	Sevilla	2–1	Atletico	Seville
	Simeone 74', 89'	Report	Moacir 51'	Stadium: Ramón Sánchez Pizjuán Stadium; Referee: Celino Gracia Redondo

16 October 1993 7	Atletico	1–2	Real Sociedad	Madrid
	Quevedo 22'	Report	Pérez 25'; Kodro 37' (pen.)	Stadium: Vicente Calderón Stadium; Referee: José Pajares Paz

24 October 1993 8	Albacete Balompié	2–2	Atletico	Albacete
	Geli 5'; Menéndez 44'	Report	Quevedo 24'; García 58' (pen.)	Stadium: Estadio Carlos Belmonte; Referee: Manuel Díaz Vega

30 October 1993 9	Atletico	4–3	Barcelona	Madrid
	Kosecki 47', 73'; Pedro 55'; Caminero 89'	Report	Romário 14', 24', 34'	Stadium: Vicente Calderón Stadium; Referee: Antonio López Nieto

6 November 1993 10	Zaragoza	2–1	Atletico	Zaragoza
	Esnáider 30'; Poyet 32'	Report	Caminero 44'	Stadium: La Romareda; Referee: Juan Fernández Marín

10 November 1993 11	Atletico	3–0	Osasuna	Madrid
	Kiko 18', 46'; Pedro 70' (pen.)	Report		Stadium: Vicente Calderón Stadium; Referee: Juan Andújar Oliver

21 November 1993 12	Real Valladolid	1–1	Atletico	Valladolid
	Amavisca 51'	Report	Toni 89'	Stadium: Estadio José Zorrilla; Referee: Alonso Gómez López

27 November 1993 13	Atletico	0–1	Deportivo La Coruña	Madrid
		Report	Đukić 64' (pen.)	Stadium: Vicente Calderón Stadium; Referee: Juan Ansuátegui Roca

4 December 1993 14	Real Oviedo	1–1	Atletico	Oviedo
	Janković 35'	Report	Pedro 44' (pen.)	Stadium: Estadio Carlos Tartiere; Referee: Juan Brito Arceo

12 December 1993 15	Athletic Bilbao	3–2	Atletico	Bilbao
	Urrutia 19'; Garitano 69' (pen.); Guerrero 89'	Report	Caminero 18'; Kosecki 49'	Stadium: San Mamés Stadium; Referee: Juan Fernández Marín

19 December 1993 16	Atletico	4–0	Racing Santander	Madrid
	Caminero 34'; García 45'; Pirri 47'; Kosecki 70'	Report		Stadium: Vicente Calderón Stadium; Referee: Francisco Santamaría Uzqueda

2 January 1994 17	Tenerife	1–1	Atlético Madrid	Santa Cruz de Tenerife
	Solozábal 13' (o.g.)	Report	Pirri 89'	Stadium: Estadio Heliodoro Rodríguez López; Referee: Joaquín Urío Velázquez

9 January 1994 18	Atlético Madrid	0–0	Lleida	Madrid
		Report		Stadium: Vicente Calderón Stadium; Referee: Clemente Rivas Fernández

16 January 1994 19	Rayo Vallecano	2–1	Atlético Madrid	Madrid
	Višnjić 10'; Onésimo 40'	Report	Kosecki 49'	Stadium: Nuevo Estadio de Vallecas; Referee: José Merino Gonzalez

23 January 1994 20	Logroñés	1–0	Atletico	Logroño
	Herrero 18'	Report		Stadium: Estadio Las Gaunas; Referee: Manuel Díaz Vega

29 January 1994 21	Atletico	2–0	Valencia	Madrid
	Pedro 4' (pen.); Gómez 73'	Report		Stadium: Vicente Calderón Stadium; Referee: José Pérez Sánchez

6 February 1994 22	Celta Vigo	3–2	Atletico	Vigo
	Losada 11', 89'; Andrijašević 43'	Report	Kosecki 6'; Oliete 76' (o.g.)	Stadium: Balaídos; Referee: Miguel Marín López

13 February 1994 23	Atletico	2–0	Sporting de Gijón	Madrid
	Kiko 5'; García 60' (pen.)	Report		Stadium: Vicente Calderón Stadium; Referee: Joaquín Urío Velázquez

19 February 1994 24	Real Madrid	1–0	Atletico	Madrid
	Morales 83'	Report		Stadium: Santiago Bernabéu Stadium; Referee: Juan Brito Arceo

23 February 1994 25	Atletico	2–4	Sevilla	Madrid
	Kosecki 1'; García 27'	Report	Bango 30', 85'; Šuker 70'; Tevenet 80'	Stadium: Vicente Calderón Stadium; Referee: José Pajares Paz

27 February 1994 26	Real Sociedad	2–1	Atletico	San Sebastián
	Kodro 42', 61'	Report	Kosecki 80'	Stadium: Anoeta Stadium; Referee: José Rubio Valdivieso

6 March 1994 27	Atletico	0–0	Albacete Balompié	Madrid
		Report		Stadium: Vicente Calderón Stadium; Referee: Francisco Santamaría Uzqueda

12 March 1994 28	Barcelona	5–3	Atletico	Barcelona
	Romário 12', 65', 74'; Stoichkov 40', 80'	Report	Pedro 21' (pen.); Manolo 35'; Caminero 45'	Stadium: Camp Nou; Referee: Juan Andújar Oliver

20 March 1994 29	Atletico	0–4	Zaragoza	Madrid
		Report	Esnáider 15'; Belsué 69'; Aragón 75' (pen.); Sanjuán 84'	Stadium: Vicente Calderón Stadium; Referee: Antonio López Nieto

27 March 1994 30	Osasuna	0–1	Atletico	Pamplona
		Report	Soler 59'	Stadium: El Sadar Stadium; Referee: Manuel Díaz Vega

3 April 1994 31	Atletico	2–0	Real Valladolid	Madrid
	Juanito 52'; Pirri 89'	Report		Stadium: Vicente Calderón Stadium; Referee: José Pérez Sánchez

7 April 1994 32	Deportivo La Coruña	2–1	Atletico	A Coruña
	Donato 43'; Nando 74'	Report	Kosecki 59'	Stadium: Estadio Riazor; Referee: Joaquín Urío Velázquez

10 April 1994 33	Atletico	0–3	Real Oviedo	Madrid
		Report	Janković 35'; Carlos 67'; Sietes 89'	Stadium: Vicente Calderón Stadium; Referee: Segundo Bello Blanco

17 April 1994 34	Atletico	4–2	Athletic Bilbao	Madrid
	García 21' (pen.), 25', 53' (pen.); Manolo 83'	Report	Valverde 67', 85'	Stadium: Vicente Calderón Stadium; Referee: Juan Fernández Marín

24 April 1994 35	Racing Santander	2–0	Atletico	Santander
	Alfaro 25'; Villabona 58'	Report		Stadium: Campos de Sport de El Sardinero; Referee: Celino Gracia Redondo

1 May 1994 36	Atletico	2–0	Tenerife	Madrid
	García 4' (pen.); Caminero 65'	Report		Stadium: Vicente Calderón Stadium; Referee: José Rubio Valdivieso

8 May 1994 37	Lleida	0–1	Atletico	Lleida
		Report	Kosecki 47'	Stadium: Camp d'Esports; Referee: Manuel Díaz Vega

15 May 1994 38	Atletico	2–0	Rayo Vallecano	Madrid
	Kiko 86'; Manolo 88'	Report		Stadium: Vicente Calderón Stadium; Referee: Celino Gracia Redondo

=== Copa del Rey ===
4 January 1994 Round of 16; First leg	Real Madrid	2–2	Atlético Madrid	Madrid
20:00	Zamorano 10'; Míchel 82' (pen.)	Report	Caminero 34', 53'	Stadium: Santiago Bernabéu Stadium; Attendance: 80,000; Referee: Juan Fernández Marín

13 January 1994 Round of 16; Second leg	Atlético Madrid	2–3 (4–5 agg.)	Real Madrid	Madrid
20:30	Juanito 42'; Pedro 80' (pen.)	Report	Butragueño 40'; Luis Enrique 48'; Lasa 65'	Stadium: Vicente Calderón Stadium; Attendance: 50,000; Referee: Antonio López Nieto

=== UEFA Cup ===
14 September 1993 First round First leg	Heart of Midlothian (Scotland)	2–1	(Spain) Atlético Madrid	Edinburgh
	Robertson 70'; Colquhoun 75'	Report	Kosecki 78'	Stadium: Tynecastle Park; Attendance: 15,596; Referee: (Sweden) Anders Frisk

28 September 1993 First round Second leg	Atlético Madrid (Spain)	3–0 (4–2 agg.)	(Scotland) Heart of Midlothian	Madrid
	Pedro 34'; Manolo 72'; García 76'	Report		Stadium: Vicente Calderón Stadium; Attendance: 35,000; Referee: (Belgium) Guy Goethals

20 October 1993 Second round First leg	Atlético Madrid (Spain)	1–0	(Greece) OFI	Madrid
	García 58'	Report		Stadium: Vicente Calderón Stadium; Attendance: 11,600; Referee: (England) Brian Hill

3 November 1993 Second round Second leg	OFI (Greece)	2–0 (2–1 agg.)	(Spain) Atlético Madrid	Heraklion
	Machlas 52'; Tsifoutis 62' (pen.)	Report		Stadium: Theodoros Vardinogiannis Stadium; Attendance: 15,000; Referee: (Czech Republic) Jiří Ulrich

== Squad statistics ==
=== Appearances and goals ===
No.	Pos	Nat	Player	Total		La Liga		Copa del Rey		UEFA Cup	
No.	Pos	Nat	Player	Apps	Goals	Apps	Goals	Apps	Goals	Apps	Goals
	GK	(Spain) ESP	Diego Diaz	28	0	23	0	1	0	4	0
	DF	(Spain) ESP	Tomás	31	0	29	0	2	0	0	0
	DF	(Spain) ESP	Juanito	33	2	30+1	1	2	1	0	0
	DF	(Spain) ESP	Juanma Lopez	30	0	24+1	0	0+1	0	4	0
	DF	(Spain) ESP	Pedro	32	7	26	5	2	1	4	1
	MF	(Spain) ESP	Pirri Mori	39	4	30+4	4	2	0	3	0
	MF	(Spain) ESP	Juan Vizcaíno	28	1	27	1	0+1	0	0	0
	MF	(Spain) ESP	Perez Caminero	30	8	25+1	6	1	2	3	0
	FW	(Spain) ESP	Kiko	36	5	23+8	5	2	0	3	0
	FW	(Mexico) MEX	Luis García	34	13	25+4	11	1+1	0	3	2
	FW	(Poland) POL	Roman Kosecki	38	11	30+3	10	2	0	2+1	1
	GK	(Spain) ESP	Abel Resino	18	0	15+2	0	1	0	0	0
	FW	(Spain) ESP	Manolo	29	5	22+3	4	0	0	4	1
	DF	(Spain) ESP	Pizo Gómez	31	1	22+3	1	2	0	4	0
	DF	(Spain) ESP	Toni Muñoz	19	1	19	1	0	0	0	0
	DF	(Spain) ESP	Solozabal	21	0	16+2	0	2	0	1	0
	MF	(Brazil) BRA	Moacir	15	1	9+2	1	0	0	4	0
	MF	(Spain) ESP	Mami Quevedo	19	2	8+5	2	2	0	4	0
	MF	(Spain) ESP	Soler	14	1	7+7	1	0	0	0	0
	DF	(Spain) ESP	Juanma	2	0	1+1	0	0	0	0	0
	DF	(Spain) ESP	Valles	1	0	1	0	0	0	0	0
	MF	(Ivory Coast) CIV	Maguy	8	0	4+4	0	0	0	0	0
	FW	(Paraguay) PAR	Benitez	7	0	2+5	0	0	0	0	0
	FW	(Spain) ESP	Juan Sabas	15	0	0+13	0	0+1	0	0+1	0
	FW	(Brazil) BRA	Mario Tilico	2	0	0+1	0	0	0	1	0

=== Disciplinary record ===
Rank	Nat.	Pos.	Name	La Liga			Copa del Rey			UEFA Cup			Total		
Rank	Nat.	Pos.	Name	Booked	(yellow card) (yellow-red card)	Sent off (straight red)	Booked	(yellow card) (yellow-red card)	Sent off (straight red)	Booked	(yellow card) (yellow-red card)	Sent off (straight red)	Booked	(yellow card) (yellow-red card)	Sent off (straight red)
1	(Spain)	DF	Juan Manuel López	14	2	0	0	0	0	0	0	0	14	2	0
2	(Poland)	FW	Roman Kosecki	12	1	0	1	0	0	0	0	0	13	1	0
3	(Spain)	MF	Pirri	9	0	1	1	0	0	0	0	0	10	0	1
4	(Spain)	DF	Tomás	7	1	0	1	1	0	0	0	0	8	2	0
4	(Spain)	DF	Juanito	10	1	0	0	0	0	0	0	0	10	1	0
6	(Spain)	DF	José Luis Caminero	7	0	0	1	0	0	0	0	1	8	0	1
7	(Spain)	MF	Juan Vizcaíno	4	1	1	1	0	0	0	0	0	5	1	1
7	(Mexico)	FW	Luis García	6	0	1	1	0	0	0	0	0	7	0	1
9	(Spain)	FW	Manolo	7	1	0	0	0	0	0	0	0	7	1	0
10	(Spain)	DF	Toni	6	0	0	0	0	0	0	0	0	6	0	0
11	(Spain)	DF	Pizo Gómez	2	1	0	1	0	0	0	0	0	3	1	0
12	(Brazil)	MF	Moacir	0	2	0	0	0	0	0	0	0	0	2	0
12	(Spain)	MF	Mami Quevedo	3	0	0	1	0	0	0	0	0	4	0	0
14	(Spain)	GK	Diego Díaz	0	0	1	0	0	0	0	0	0	0	0	1
14	(Spain)	FW	Juan Sabas	1	1	0	0	0	0	0	0	0	1	1	0
14	(Spain)	FW	Kiko	3	0	0	0	0	0	0	0	0	3	0	0
14	(Spain)	DF	Pedro	3	0	0	0	0	0	0	0	0	3	0	0
18	(Spain)	GK	Abel Resino	2	0	0	0	0	0	0	0	0	2	0	0
18	(Spain)	DF	Roberto Solozábal	2	0	0	0	0	0	0	0	0	2	0	0
20	(Paraguay)	FW	Miguel Ángel Benítez	1	0	0	0	0	0	0	0	0	1	0	0
20	(Spain)	MF	José Ignacio Soler	1	0	0	0	0	0	0	0	0	1	0	0
