= 2018–19 Segunda División =

88th season of the second-tier football league in Spain

Segunda División
- Season: 2018–19
- Dates: 17 August 2018 – 9 June 2019 (regular season)
- Champions: Osasuna
- Promoted: Osasuna; Granada; Mallorca
- Relegated: Rayo Majadahonda; Córdoba; Gimnàstic; Reus (expelled)(relegated to the Tercera División)
- Matches: 446
- Goals: 1,001 (2.24 per match)
- Top goalscorer: Álvaro (20 goals)
- Biggest home win: Las Palmas 4–0 Gimnàstic (7 September 2018); Deportivo de La Coruña 4–0 Elche (12 October 2018); Cádiz 5–1 Elche (4 November 2018); Deportivo de La Coruña 4–0 Oviedo (10 November 2018); Rayo Majadahonda 4–0 Numancia (24 March 2019)
- Biggest away win: Oviedo 0–4 Zaragoza (8 September 2018); Córdoba 0–4 Lugo (14 April 2019)
- Highest scoring: Almería 5–3 Elche (12 May 2019)
- Longest winning run: Cádiz (7 matches)
- Longest unbeaten run: Deportivo de La Coruña (13 matches)
- Longest winless run: Reus (22 matches)
- Longest losing run: Reus (21 matches)
- Highest attendance: 29,365; Deportivo La Coruña 2–0 Mallorca (20 June 2019)
- Lowest attendance: 1,515; Alcorcón 1–4 Málaga (19 April 2019)

The 2018–19 Segunda División season, also known as LaLiga 1|2|3 for sponsorship reasons, was the 88th season of the Spanish football second division since its establishment.

== Summary ==
On 18 January 2019, just one day before the start of the second half of the season, the LFP expelled Reus, due to their failure to pay their players. On 1 June 2019, Extremadura UD player José Antonio Reyes was killed in a car crash in his native hometown Utrera ahead of the last matchday 2018–19 season.

== Team changes ==
This was the first edition without reserve teams since the 2002–03 season.

=== To Segunda División ===
Promoted from 2017–18 Segunda División B

- Mallorca
- Rayo Majadahonda
- Elche
- Extremadura

Relegated from 2017–18 La Liga

- Deportivo La Coruña
- Las Palmas
- Málaga

=== From Segunda División ===
Relegated to 2018–19 Segunda División B

- Cultural Leonesa
- Barcelona B
- Sevilla Atlético

Promoted to 2018–19 La Liga

- Huesca
- Rayo Vallecano
- Valladolid

Relegated to 2018–19 Tercera División

- Lorca FC (Note: Lorca was relegated to Tercera División due to financial troubles.)

== Stadiums and locations ==
Location of teams in 2018–19 Segunda División
Location of teams in 2018–19 Segunda División (Canary Islands)

Team	Location	Stadium	Capacity
Albacete	Albacete	Carlos Belmonte	17,300
Alcorcón	Alcorcón	Santo Domingo	5,100
Almería	Almería	Juegos Mediterráneos	15,000
Cádiz	Cádiz	Ramón de Carranza	25,033
Córdoba	Córdoba	El Arcángel	20,989
Deportivo La Coruña	A Coruña	Abanca-Riazor	32,912
Elche	Elche	Martínez Valero	33,732
Extremadura	Almendralejo	Francisco de la Hera	11,580
Gimnàstic	Tarragona	Nou Estadi	14,591
Granada	Granada	Nuevo Los Cármenes	19,336
Las Palmas	Las Palmas	Gran Canaria	32,400
Lugo	Lugo	Anxo Carro	7,840
Málaga	Málaga	La Rosaleda	30,044
Mallorca	Palma	Son Moix	23,142
Numancia	Soria	Los Pajaritos	8,727
Osasuna	Pamplona	El Sadar	18,761
Oviedo	Oviedo	Carlos Tartiere	30,500
Rayo Majadahonda	Majadahonda	Cerro del Espino (Note: Rayo Majadahonda played in Wanda Metropolitano, in Madrid, during the first stage of the works of improvement of their stadium.)	3,376
~~Reus~~	~~Reus~~	~~Municipal~~	~~4,300~~
Sporting Gijón	Gijón	El Molinón	29,029
Tenerife	Santa Cruz de Tenerife	Heliodoro Rodríguez López	22,824
Zaragoza	Zaragoza	La Romareda	34,596

=== Personnel and sponsorship ===
Team	Manager	Captain	Kit manufacturer	Shirt main sponsor
Albacete	(Spain) Luis Miguel Ramis	(Spain) Álvaro Arroyo	Hummel	Seguros Solíss
Alcorcón	(Spain) Cristóbal Parralo	(Spain) Daniel Toribio	Kelme	ADA Academy
Almería	(Spain) Fran Fernández	(Spain) Ángel Trujillo	Nike	Urcisol
Cádiz	(Spain) Álvaro Cervera	(Spain) Servando	Adidas	Torrot
Córdoba	(Spain) Rafa Navarro	(Spain) Alejandro Alfaro	Kappa	Electrocosto.com
Deportivo La Coruña	(Spain) José Luis Martí	(Spain) Álex Bergantiños	Macron	Estrella Galicia
Elche	(Spain) Pacheta	(Spain) Nino	Kelme	TM Inmobiliaria
Extremadura	(Spain) Manuel Mosquera	(Spain) Willy Ledesma	Kappa	Destilerías Espronceda
Gimnàstic	(Spain) Enrique Martín	(Spain) Javi Márquez	Hummel	Sorigué
Granada	(Spain) Diego Martínez	(Spain) Alberto Martín	Erreà	
Las Palmas	(Spain) Pepe Mel	(Spain) David García	Acerbis	Gran Canaria
Lugo	(Spain) Eloy Jiménez	(Spain) Carlos Pita	Hummel	Estrella Galicia
Málaga	(Spain) Víctor Sánchez	(Uruguay) Federico Ricca	Nike	Tesesa
Mallorca	(Spain) Vicente Moreno	(Spain) Xisco Campos	Umbro	Betpoint
Numancia	(Spain) Aritz López Garai	(Spain) Adrián Ripa	Erreà	hiStORIA
Osasuna	(Spain) Jagoba Arrasate	(Spain) Oier Sanjurjo	Hummel	Kirolbet
Oviedo	(Argentina) Sergio Egea	(Spain) Saúl Berjón	Adidas	
Rayo Majadahonda	(Spain) Antonio Iriondo	(Spain) Basilio Sancho	Hummel	Emirates Khalifa Capital
Reus	N/A		Kelme	
Sporting Gijón	(Spain) José Alberto	(Spain) Roberto Canella	Nike	Pastón.es, Integra Energía, Telecable, Nissan
Tenerife	(Spain) Luis César Sampedro	(Spain) Suso	Hummel	
Zaragoza	(Spain) Víctor Fernández	(Spain) Alberto Zapater	Adidas	Caravan Fragancias

=== Managerial changes ===
Team	Outgoing manager	Manner of departure	Date of vacancy	Position in table	Replaced by	Date of appointment
Deportivo La Coruña	(Netherlands) Clarence Seedorf	Resigned	22 May 2018	Pre-season	(Spain) Natxo González	15 June 2018
Alcorcón	(Spain) Julio Velázquez	Resigned	4 June 2018	Pre-season	(Spain) Cristóbal Parralo	19 June 2018
Lugo	(Spain) Francisco	Mutual consent	5 June 2018	Pre-season	(Spain) Javi López	17 June 2018
Osasuna	(Spain) Diego Martínez	Sacked	7 June 2018	Pre-season	(Spain) Jagoba Arrasate	20 June 2018
Córdoba	(Spain) José Ramón Sandoval	End of contract	12 June 2018	Pre-season	(Spain) Francisco	28 June 2018
Zaragoza	(Spain) Natxo González	Resigned	12 June 2018	Pre-season	(Spain) Imanol Idiakez	18 June 2018
Numancia	(Spain) Jagoba Arrasate	Resigned	18 June 2018	Pre-season	(Spain) Aritz López Garai	24 June 2018
Reus	(Spain) Aritz López Garai	Mutual consent	23 June 2018	Pre-season	(Spain) Xavi Bartolo	23 June 2018
Albacete	(Spain) Enrique Martín	End of contract	4 June 2018	Pre-season	(Spain) Luis Miguel Ramis	24 June 2018
Málaga	(Spain) José González	End of contract	20 June 2018	Pre-season	(Spain) Juan Muñiz	20 June 2018
Las Palmas	(Spain) Paco Jémez	End of contract	25 May 2018	Pre-season	(Spain) Manolo Jiménez	26 May 2018
Granada	(Spain) Miguel Ángel Portugal	End of contract	4 June 2018	Pre-season	(Spain) Diego Martínez	14 June 2018
Córdoba	(Spain) Francisco	Resigned	2 August 2018	Pre-season	(Spain) José Ramón Sandoval	3 August 2018
Tenerife	(Spain) Joseba Etxeberria	Sacked	17 September 2018	19th	(Spain) José Luis Oltra	17 September 2018
Zaragoza	(Spain) Imanol Idiakez	Sacked	21 October 2018	16th	(Spain) Lucas Alcaraz	22 October 2018
Gimnàstic	(Spain) José Antonio Gordillo	Sacked	22 October 2018	22nd	(Spain) Enrique Martín	23 October 2018
Lugo	(Spain) Javi López	Sacked	27 October 2018	15th	(Spain) Alberto Monteagudo	28 October 2018
Extremadura	(Spain) Juan Sabas	Sacked	10 November 2018	21st	(Spain) Rodri	13 November 2018
Las Palmas	(Spain) Manolo Jiménez	Sacked	16 November 2018	5th	(Spain) Paco Herrera	16 November 2018
Sporting Gijón	(Spain) Rubén Baraja	Sacked	18 November 2018	14th	(Spain) José Alberto	18 November 2018
Córdoba	(Spain) José Ramón Sandoval	Sacked	18 November 2018	21st	(Spain) Curro Torres	19 November 2018
Zaragoza	(Spain) Lucas Alcaraz	Sacked	17 December 2018	20th	(Spain) Víctor Fernández	17 December 2018
Reus	(Spain) Xavi Bartolo	Resigned	5 February 2019	22nd	N/A	
Extremadura	(Spain) Rodri	Sacked	16 February 2019	19th	(Spain) Manuel Mosquera	27 February 2019
Córdoba	(Spain) Curro Torres	Sacked	25 February 2019	21st	(Spain) Rafa Navarro	25 February 2019
Las Palmas	(Spain) Paco Herrera	Sacked	4 March 2019	11th	(Spain) Pepe Mel	4 March 2019
Deportivo La Coruña	(Spain) Natxo González	Sacked	7 April 2019	5th	(Spain) José Luis Martí	8 April 2019
Málaga	(Spain) Juan Muñiz	Sacked	14 April 2019	5th	(Spain) Víctor Sánchez	15 April 2019
Lugo	(Spain) Alberto Monteagudo	Sacked	20 April 2019	19th	(Spain) Eloy Jiménez	21 April 2019
Oviedo	(Spain) Juan Antonio Anquela	Sacked	22 April 2019	9th	(Argentina) Sergio Egea	22 April 2019
Tenerife	(Spain) José Luis Oltra	Sacked	12 May 2019	17th	(Spain) Luis César Sampedro	13 May 2019

== League table ==
=== Standings ===
Pos	Team	Pld	W	D	L	GF	GA	GD	Pts	Promotion, qualification or relegation
1	Osasuna (C, P)	42	26	9	7	59	35	+24	87	Promotion to La Liga
2	Granada (P)	42	22	13	7	52	28	+24	79	Promotion to La Liga
3	Málaga	42	21	11	10	51	31	+20	74	Qualification to promotion play-offs
4	Albacete	42	19	14	9	54	38	+16	71	Qualification to promotion play-offs
5	Mallorca (O, P)	42	19	12	11	53	37	+16	69	Qualification to promotion play-offs
6	Deportivo La Coruña	42	17	17	8	50	32	+18	68	Qualification to promotion play-offs
7	Cádiz	42	16	16	10	53	36	+17	64	
8	Oviedo	42	17	12	13	48	48	0	63	
9	Sporting Gijón	42	16	13	13	43	38	+5	61	
10	Almería	42	15	15	12	51	39	+12	60	
11	Elche	42	13	16	13	49	52	−3	55	
12	Las Palmas	42	12	18	12	48	50	−2	54	
13	Extremadura	42	14	11	17	43	47	−4	53	
14	Alcorcón	42	14	10	18	36	42	−6	52	
15	Zaragoza	42	13	12	17	49	51	−2	51	
16	Tenerife	42	11	17	14	40	50	−10	50	
17	Numancia	42	11	16	15	44	50	−6	49	
18	Lugo	42	10	17	15	43	51	−8	47	
19	Rayo Majadahonda (R)	42	12	9	21	46	61	−15	45	Relegation to Segunda División B
20	Gimnàstic (R)	42	9	9	24	30	63	−33	36	Relegation to Segunda División B
21	Córdoba (R)	42	7	13	22	48	79	−31	34	Relegation to Segunda División B
22	Reus (Note: Reus were expelled after the end of the first half of the season due to unpaid wages. Their matches of the second half were given as 1–0 wins to their opponents.) (D)	42	5	6	31	16	48	−32	0	Expelled from the league by the Federation for financial issues

Source: La Liga
Rules for classification: 1) points; 2) head-to-head points; 3) head-to-head goal difference; 4) goal difference; 5) number of goals scored
(C) Champions; (D) Disqualified; (O) Play-off winners; (P) Promoted; (R) Relegated

=== Positions by round ===
The table lists the positions of teams after each week of matches. In order to preserve chronological evolvements, any postponed matches are not included to the round at which they were originally scheduled, but added to the full round they were played immediately afterwards. For example, if a match is scheduled for matchday 13, but then postponed and played between days 16 and 17, it will be added to the standings for day 16.

Team ╲ Round	1	2	3	4	5	6	7	8	9	10	11	12	13	14	15	16	17	18	19	20	21	22	23	24	25	26	27	28	29	30	31	32	33	34	35	36	37	38	39	40	41	42
Osasuna	21	18	21	15	15	14	13	13	11	12	12	9	8	7	9	8	8	7	7	5	6	5	4	3	2	3	1	1	1	1	1	1	1	1	1	1	1	1	1	1	1	1
Granada	17	13	7	6	3	4	2	2	2	3	2	1	1	3	4	3	1	1	1	1	1	1	1	1	5	5	3	2	2	2	2	2	2	3	3	2	2	2	2	2	2	2
Málaga	2	1	1	1	1	1	1	1	1	1	1	2	4	2	3	5	4	3	3	4	3	2	2	2	4	2	4	4	4	5	4	4	4	6	6	6	7	5	5	4	3	3
Albacete	8	10	4	5	5	3	6	7	7	8	6	5	5	5	5	4	5	4	2	2	2	4	5	5	1	1	2	3	3	3	3	3	3	2	2	3	3	3	3	3	4	4
Mallorca	5	2	3	2	4	7	8	6	6	6	7	8	7	8	6	6	7	8	8	8	8	8	8	7	9	8	8	9	7	6	6	7	6	5	5	4	4	4	4	5	5	5
Deportivo	10	7	8	7	8	6	5	5	3	4	3	4	3	4	2	2	3	2	4	3	4	3	3	4	3	4	5	5	5	4	5	5	5	7	7	7	6	7	7	7	6	6
Cádiz	4	6	9	11	13	16	17	18	20	20	19	12	9	9	7	7	6	6	6	7	7	7	7	9	8	7	6	6	6	7	7	6	7	4	4	5	5	6	6	6	7	7
Oviedo	13	3	5	13	10	8	11	8	12	7	8	10	12	10	10	10	11	12	12	10	9	9	9	8	6	6	7	7	8	8	8	8	9	9	9	8	8	8	8	8	8	8
Sporting	14	5	2	8	7	10	7	9	10	10	10	13	14	14	13	11	12	9	9	11	12	11	11	10	12	12	13	12	12	11	10	10	8	8	8	9	9	10	10	10	9	9
Almería	20	16	18	20	17	13	9	11	8	9	9	7	10	12	11	12	10	11	10	9	10	10	10	11	10	10	10	8	9	9	9	9	10	10	10	10	10	9	9	9	10	10
Elche	16	12	17	18	20	21	20	16	19	17	11	14	15	16	19	18	18	15	15	17	13	15	17	18	15	15	14	14	13	14	13	12	11	12	12	12	12	12	11	11	11	11
Las Palmas	1	4	6	3	2	2	3	3	5	5	5	6	6	6	8	9	9	10	11	12	11	12	12	12	11	11	11	11	11	12	12	13	13	13	13	13	13	13	12	13	12	12
Extremadura	11	17	19	21	22	20	19	22	17	18	20	21	21	20	17	15	16	18	19	19	19	19	19	19	19	19	19	19	19	19	19	19	19	19	18	15	14	15	15	15	13	13
Alcorcón	9	15	12	12	9	5	4	4	4	2	4	3	2	1	1	1	2	5	5	6	5	6	6	6	7	9	9	10	10	10	11	11	12	11	11	11	11	11	13	12	14	14
Zaragoza	3	8	10	4	6	9	10	10	14	16	18	19	16	15	18	19	19	20	17	15	16	17	15	14	14	14	15	15	18	15	17	15	16	17	14	14	15	14	14	14	15	15
Tenerife	15	11	14	17	19	19	15	19	18	19	15	18	18	18	16	17	17	17	18	16	17	14	16	15	16	16	17	16	16	16	15	16	17	14	15	18	16	17	18	17	17	16
Numancia	7	9	16	10	12	15	16	12	9	11	13	11	11	13	14	13	13	13	13	14	15	13	13	13	13	13	12	13	14	13	14	14	15	16	17	17	18	16	16	16	16	17
Lugo	18	14	11	14	16	12	12	15	15	13	16	15	17	17	15	16	15	14	14	13	14	16	14	16	18	18	18	18	17	18	18	18	18	18	19	19	19	18	17	18	18	18
Rayo	19	22	15	9	14	17	18	14	13	15	14	17	13	11	12	14	14	16	16	18	18	18	18	17	17	17	16	17	15	17	16	17	14	15	16	16	17	19	19	19	19	19
Gimnàstic	12	20	20	22	18	18	21	20	21	22	21	22	22	22	22	22	22	22	22	22	22	21	21	21	21	21	21	21	20	20	20	21	21	20	20	20	21	20	21	21	20	20
Córdoba	6	19	22	19	21	22	22	21	22	21	22	20	20	21	21	21	21	21	20	21	21	20	20	20	20	20	20	20	21	21	21	20	20	21	21	21	20	21	20	20	21	21
Reus	22	21	13	16	11	11	14	17	16	14	17	16	19	19	20	20	20	19	21	20	20	22	22	22	22	22	22	22	22	22	22	22	22	22	22	22	22	22	22	22	22	22

Promotion to La Liga
Qualification to promotion play-offs
Relegation to Segunda División B

Source: BDFútbol

=== Results ===
Home \ Away	ALB	ALC	ALM	CAD	COR	DEP	ELC	EXT	GIM	GRA	LPA	LUG	MGA	MLL	NUM	OSA	OVI	MAJ	REU	SPO	TFE	ZAR
Albacete	—	2–1	1–1	1–1	3–0	1–1	1–1	1–0	2–0	0–1	4–2	1–0	1–2	2–0	0–0	2–2	0–0	1–0	1–0^{1}	1–1	2–2	2–2
Alcorcón	0–1	—	0–0	1–2	2–1	1–0	1–0	0–1	0–1	1–0	2–0	0–0	1–4	1–0	1–1	0–0	2–0	2–0	0–1	1–1	1–1	2–0
Almería	3–0	0–0	—	0–0	3–1	1–1	5–3	1–1	3–0	0–0	3–0	1–1	0–1	2–0	1–0	0–1	0–1	2–2	2–0	2–1	1–1	2–1
Cádiz	1–0	0–2	1–0	—	1–1	3–0	5–1	0–1	1–1	0–0	4–1	1–1	1–1	1–1	2–1	0–0	1–1	1–0	2–0	0–0	2–0	3–3
Córdoba	1–3	0–0	1–0	1–3	—	1–1	1–1	4–2	4–3	1–2	4–1	0–4	1–1	3–2	3–3	2–3	2–4	1–1	1–0^{1}	1–2	1–1	0–3
Deportivo La Coruña	2–0	2–2	0–0	1–1	2–0	—	4–0	1–2	1–1	2–1	0–1	0–0	1–1	1–0	2–2	2–0	4–0	0–2	2–0	1–0	0–0	3–1
Elche	0–1	3–1	2–2	1–0	1–0	0–0	—	2–0	1–0	0–0	0–0	2–1	2–0	1–1	1–1	1–2	1–2	2–1	0–2	0–0	3–0	2–0
Extremadura	1–2	3–0	1–0	2–1	3–0	0–1	2–2	—	0–1	1–3	1–2	0–0	1–0	0–0	0–1	2–3	0–2	1–1	1–0^{1}	0–3	1–0	0–3
Gimnàstic	1–0	1–3	2–2	2–3	1–0	1–3	3–3	0–1	—	0–1	0–0	1–1	0–1	2–1	2–0	1–0	2–1	0–1	1–0^{1}	0–0	1–1	1–3
Granada	1–1	2–1	1–0	1–1	4–2	0–1	2–1	0–0	2–0	—	1–1	1–1	1–0	1–0	0–0	2–0	1–0	3–0	1–0^{1}	1–2	2–1	1–0
Las Palmas	1–1	0–0	0–0	0–3	1–0	1–1	0–1	1–1	4–0	2–2	—	4–1	1–0	1–2	3–0	4–1	0–0	3–2	2–0	1–0	1–1	1–1
Lugo	0–3	0–1	4–2	1–2	2–1	1–0	2–2	1–1	1–0	1–2	4–2	—	1–2	1–1	3–2	2–2	0–2	3–2	1–0^{1}	0–0	0–0	1–2
Málaga	2–1	1–0	1–1	1–0	3–0	0–0	3–0	1–2	2–0	0–1	0–0	2–1	—	0–1	2–0	1–2	3–0	1–0	0–3	1–1	1–0	3–1
Mallorca	1–3	2–0	1–0	1–0	3–0	1–0	1–1	1–1	2–0	1–1	2–2	3–0	1–2	—	1–0	1–0	1–0	2–0	1–0^{1}	2–1	4–1	3–0
Numancia	1–2	2–0	0–2	1–1	3–2	1–2	1–0	1–0	3–0	2–1	1–1	3–0	1–1	1–1	—	1–1	2–3	1–2	1–0^{1}	1–2	2–0	1–0
Osasuna	2–0	2–1	3–1	2–1	3–1	2–1	1–1	1–0	1–0	1–0	2–0	1–0	2–1	2–0	0–0	—	1–0	3–0	1–0^{1}	1–0	2–0	1–0
Oviedo	1–0	1–0	1–2	2–1	3–3	1–1	1–1	1–1	2–0	1–1	1–1	1–1	0–0	1–1	1–0	2–1	—	4–3	3–0	2–1	1–0	0–4
Rayo Majadahonda	2–3	2–0	2–0	1–1	0–0	0–0	1–3	1–4	1–0	0–3	0–0	1–0	0–1	0–1	4–0	1–1	1–0	—	1–0^{1}	2–1	1–3	2–2
Reus	1–2	0–1^{1}	0–1^{1}	0–1^{1}	1–1	0–1^{1}	0–1^{1}	1–4	1–1	1–2	0–1^{1}	0–0	0–1^{1}	0–2	1–1	0–1	0–1^{1}	2–1	—	0–1^{1}	0–1^{1}	0–0
Sporting Gijón	0–2	2–0	1–0	1–0	0–0	1–2	1–1	2–0	2–0	1–0	1–0	0–0	2–2	1–0	1–1	0–2	1–0	2–3	1–1	—	2–1	1–2
Tenerife	0–0	3–2	1–3	1–0	0–2	2–2	2–1	0–0	2–0	1–1	2–1	0–0	0–0	2–2	1–1	3–2	2–1	2–1	0–1	0–1	—	1–0
Zaragoza	0–0	0–2	1–2	0–1	0–0	0–1	1–0	2–1	3–0	0–2	1–1	0–2	0–2	2–2	0–0	1–1	2–0	2–1	1–0^{1}	4–2	1–1	—

Source: LaLiga
Legend: Blue = home team win; Yellow = draw; Red = away team win.
- ^{1} The opponents of Reus awarded a 1–0 w/o win each.

== Promotion play-offs ==
Semi-finals
Deportivo La Coruña	4	1	5
Málaga	2	0	2
Mallorca	2	0	2
Albacete	0	1	1

Final
Deportivo La Coruña	2	0	2
Mallorca	0	3	3

== Season statistics ==
=== Scoring ===
- First goal of the season:
  (Spain) Álex Fernández for Cádiz against Almería (17 August 2018)
- Last goal of the season:
  Regular season: (Spain) Nano for Tenerife against Zaragoza (9 June 2019)
  Play-offs: (Spain) Abdón Prats for Mallorca against Deportivo La Coruña (23 June 2019)

=== Top goalscorers ===
Rank	Player	Club	Goals
1	(Spain) Álvaro	Almería	20
2	(Spain) Quique	Deportivo La Coruña	16
3	(Spain) Rubén Castro	Las Palmas	15
3	(Spain) Enric Gallego	Extremadura	15
5	(Spain) Juan Muñoz	Alcorcón	13
6	(Italy) Federico Piovaccari	Córdoba	12
6	(Spain) Roberto Torres	Osasuna	12
6	(Spain) Juan Villar	Osasuna	12

=== Top assists ===
Rank	Player	Club	Assists
1	(Spain) Rubén García	Osasuna	12
2	(Spain) Álvaro Vadillo	Granada	11
3	(Spain) Álvaro Tejero	Albacete	10
4	(Spain) Salva Sevilla	Mallorca	9
5	(Argentina) Gustavo Blanco	Málaga	8
5	(Ivory Coast) Lago Junior	Mallorca	8
5	(Spain) Alain Oyarzun	Numancia	8
8	(Spain) Néstor Susaeta	Albacete	7
8	(Spain) Fede Vico	Granada	7
10	(Spain) Kike Barja	Osasuna	6
10	(Argentina) Fede Cartabia	Deportivo La Coruña	6
10	(Spain) Marco Sangalli	Alcorcón	6
10	(Spain) Fran Villalba	Numancia	6

=== Zamora Trophy ===
The Zamora Trophy was awarded by newspaper Marca to the goalkeeper with the least goals-to-games ratio. Keepers had to play at least 28 games of 60 or more minutes to be eligible for the trophy.

Rank	Player	Club	Goals Against	Matches	Average
1	(Portugal) Rui Silva	Granada	27	40	0.68
2	(Spain) Dani Giménez	Deportivo La Coruña	32	41	0.78
2	(Spain) Rubén	Osasuna	28	35	0.80
4	(Morocco) Munir	Málaga	30	36	0.83
5	(Spain) Diego Mariño	Sporting Gijón	31	37	0.84

=== Hat-tricks ===
Player	For	Against	Result	Date	Round	Reference
(Spain) Enric Gallego	Extremadura	Rayo Majadahonda	4–1 (A)	22 September 2018	6	
(Spain) Carlos Fernández	Deportivo La Coruña	Elche	4–0 (H)	12 October 2018	9	
(Spain) Enric Gallego ^{4}	Extremadura	Reus	4–1 (A)	17 November 2018	14	
(Venezuela) Darwin Machís	Cádiz	Las Palmas	3–0 (A)	14 April 2019	34	
(Spain) Marc Gual	Zaragoza	Córdoba	3–0 (A)	28 April 2019	36	
(Spain) Álvaro	Almería	Elche	5–3 (H)	12 May 2019	38	

Note

^{4} Player scored 4 goals; (H) – Home; (A) – Away

=== Discipline ===
==== Player ====
- Most yellow cards: 20
  - (Spain) Manuel Sánchez (Elche)
- Most red cards: 3
  - (Spain) Carlos Bellvís (Alcorcón)
  - (Ukraine) Roman Zozulya (Albacete)

==== Team ====
- Most yellow cards: 141
  - Tenerife
- Most red cards: 9
  - Deportivo La Coruña
- Fewest yellow cards: 42
  - Reus
- Fewest red cards: 0
  - Reus

== Average attendances ==
Attendances include play-off games.

Pos	Team	Total	High	Low	Average	Change
1	Zaragoza	409,702	25,978	14,912	20,485	+6.9%
2	Málaga	407,443	27,450	12,758	18,520	−9.1%^{1}
3	Sporting Gijón	386,070	26,748	8,600	18,384	−11.8%
4	Deportivo La Coruña	406,001	29,271	13,602	17,652	−14.5%^{1}
5	Osasuna	296,882	16,884	12,818	14,841	+7.2%
6	Oviedo	282,031	23,175	5,683	13,430	−4.1%
7	Cádiz	278,737	15,914	10,434	13,273	+0.9%
8	Las Palmas	256,262	21,319	7,288	12,203	−24.4%^{1}
9	Granada	231,321	18,282	8,321	11,566	+6.6%
10	Tenerife	235,540	18,717	8,952	11,216	−6.9%
11	Córdoba	205,539	14,312	2,313	10,277	−21.2%
12	Extremadura	201,363	11,580	7,707	10,068	+45.1%^{2}
13	Albacete	204,011	15,065	5,849	9,715	+45.5%
14	Elche	197,896	12,868	5,914	9,424	+15.2%^{2}
15	Mallorca	196,330	21,210	5,795	8,924	+36.9%^{2}
16	Almería	146,706	11,532	4,329	6,986	−1.5%
17	Gimnàstic	84,280	8,625	1,669	4,214	−27.4%
18	Lugo	75,266	6,113	2,662	3,763	0.0%
19	Numancia	69,001	6,069	2,537	3,450	−15.1%
20	Rayo Majadahonda	67,118	7,217	1,764	3,356	n/a^{2,3}
21	Reus	31,401	4,194	2,056	2,855	+10.5%^{4}
22	Alcorcón	59,337	3,665	1,515	2,826	−1.3%
	League total	4,728,177	29,271	1,515	10,578	+20.6%

Source: LaLiga.es
Notes:
1: Team played last season in La Liga.
2: Team played last season in Segunda División B.
3: Rayo Majadahonda played seven games at Wanda Metropolitano during the renovations works of Cerro del Espino.
4: Reus was excluded after the round 21 and only played 11 home matches.

== Monthly awards ==
Month	Player of the Month		Reference
Month	Player	Club	Reference
September	(Morocco) Munir	Málaga	
October	(Spain) Carlos Fernández	Deportivo La Coruña	
November	(Spain) Enric Gallego	Extremadura	
December	(Spain) Eugeni	Albacete	
January	(Spain) Roberto Torres	Osasuna	
February	(Venezuela) Darwin Machís	Cádiz	
March	(Spain) Luis Milla	Tenerife	
April	(Spain) Salva Sevilla	Mallorca	
