= 1992–93 Atlético Madrid season =

62nd season in existence of Atlético Madrid

Atlético Madrid
1992–93 season
- President: Jesús Gil
- Head coach: Luis Aragonés (until 31 January 1993); Iselín Santos Ovejero (caretaker, January to February); José Omar Pastoriza (February to March); Iselín Santos Ovejero (caretaker, March); Ramón Heredia
- Stadium: Vicente Calderón
- La Liga: 6th
- Supercopa de España: Runners-up
- Copa del Rey: Round of 16
- European Cup Winners' Cup: Semi-finals
- Top goalscorer: League: Luis García (17); All: Luis García (20)
Home colours	Away colours

The 1992–93 season was Atlético Madrid's 62nd season since foundation in 1903 and the club's 58th season in La Liga, the top league of Spanish football. Atlético competed in La Liga, the Supercopa de España, the Copa del Rey, and the European Cup Winners' Cup.

== Squad ==
Note: Flags indicate national team as defined under FIFA eligibility rules; some limited exceptions apply. Players may hold more than one non-FIFA nationality.

No.	Pos.	Nation	Player
—	GK	ESP	Diego Díaz
—	GK	ESP	Ángel Mejías
—	GK	ESP	Abel Resino
—	DF	ESP	Tomás Reñones
—	DF	ESP	Carlos Aguilera
—	DF	ESP	Patxi Ferreira
—	DF	ESP	Juanito
—	DF	ESP	Juanma López
—	DF	ESP	Alejandro Sánchez
—	DF	ESP	Roberto Solozábal
—	DF	ESP	Pedro
—	DF	ESP	Toni
—	MF	ESP	Antonio Acosta
—	MF	ESP	Alfredo

No.	Pos.	Nation	Player
—	MF	BRA	Donato
—	MF	GER	Bernd Schuster
—	MF	ESP	Gonzalo
—	MF	ESP	Gabriel Moya
—	MF	ESP	Antonio Orejuela
—	MF	ARG	José Luis Villarreal
—	MF	ESP	Juan Vizcaíno
—	FW	MEX	Luis García
—	FW	ESP	Manolo
—	FW	ESP	Manolo Alfaro
—	FW	YUG	Vladan Lukić
—	FW	ESP	Jorge Rajado
—	FW	ESP	Juan Sabas

=== Transfers ===
In
Pos.	Name	from	Type
FW	Luis García	Pumas UNAM	

Out
Pos.	Name	To	Type
FW	Gerhard Rodax	Rapid Wien	
DF	Miquel Soler	Barcelona	
FW	Sebastián Losada	Sevilla	
DF	Pizo Gómez	Rayo Vallecano	loan

==== Winter ====
In
Pos.	Name	from	Type
MF	José Luis Villarreal	Boca Juniors	-
MF	Vladan Lukić	Crvena Zvezda	-

Out
Pos.	Name	To	Type
FW	Paulo Futre	Benfica	

== Results ==
=== La Liga ===
==== League table ====
Pos	Team	Pld	W	D	L	GF	GA	GD	Pts	Qualification or relegation
4	Valencia	38	19	10	9	60	33	+27	48	Qualification for the UEFA Cup first round
5	Tenerife	38	15	14	9	59	47	+12	44	Qualification for the UEFA Cup first round
6	Atlético Madrid	38	16	11	11	52	42	+10	43 (Note: SEV 1–3 ATM; ATM 1–0 SEV)	Qualification for the UEFA Cup first round
7	Sevilla	38	17	9	12	46	44	+2	43	
8	Athletic Bilbao	38	17	6	15	53	49	+4	40	

Source: LFP
Rules for classification: 1) points; 2) head-to-head points; 3) head-to-head goal difference; 4) head-to-head goals scored; 5) goal difference; 6) number of goals scored.

==== Position by round ====
Round	1	2	3	4	5	6	7	8	9	10	11	12	13	14	15	16	17	18	19	20	21	22	23	24	25	26	27	28	29	30	31	32	33	34	35	36	37	38
Ground	A	H	H	A	H	A	H	A	H	A	H	A	H	A	H	A	H	A	H	H	A	A	H	A	H	A	H	A	H	A	H	A	H	A	H	A	H	A
Result	W	W	L	D	W	W	D	L	W	W	W	W	D	L	L	L	D	D	L	D	W	D	W	W	L	W	W	L	D	D	W	L	W	L	D	W	L	D
Position	4	2	7	8	4	3	2	4	4	4	3	3	3	4	5	5	6	6	7	8	8	7	6	4	6	4	4	5	6	6	6	6	6	6	6	6	6	6

Source: BDFutbol
A = Away; H = Home; W = Win; D = Draw; L = Loss; = Leader, 1993–94 UEFA Champions League Group stage; = 1993–94 UEFA Cup First round; = 1992–93 Relegation playoff to 1993–94 Segunda Division; = 1993–94 Segunda Division; R = 1993–94 UEFA Cup Winners' Cup

==== Matches ====
Win Draw Loss

6 September 1992 1	Atletico	3–2	Tenerife	Madrid
	Solozábal 31'; García 81', 88'	Report	Pizzi 47' (pen.); Pier 89'	Stadium: Vicente Calderón Stadium; Referee: José Pérez Sánchez

13 September 1992 2	Español	1–3	Atletico	Barcelona
	Escaich 85'	Report	Futre 13', 69'; Moya 51'	Stadium: Sarrià Stadium; Referee: Tomás Jiménez Moreno

19 September 1992 3	Atletico	1–4	Barcelona	Madrid
	Futre 29'	Report	Stoichkov 4', 8', 47'; Amor 89'	Stadium: Vicente Calderón Stadium; Referee: Joaquín Urío Velázquez

27 September 1992 4	Cádiz CF	1–1	Atletico	Cádiz
	Arteaga 49'	Report	Manolo 66'	Stadium: Estadio Ramón de Carranza; Referee: Clemente Rivas Fernández

4 October 1992 5	Atletico	2–0	Real Burgos	Madrid
	Manolo 15'; Donato 80'	Report		Stadium: Vicente Calderón Stadium; Referee: Carmelo Rodríguez Martel

7 October 1992 6	Real Oviedo	1–4	Atletico	Oviedo
	Janković 65' (pen.)	Report	Donato 44'; Futre 51'; Moya 72', 84'	Stadium: Estadio Carlos Tartiere; Referee: Ángel Calvo Córdova

18 October 1992 7	Atletico	1–1	Sporting de Gijón	Madrid
	García 44'	Report	Abelardo 84'	Stadium: Vicente Calderón Stadium; Referee: Juan Fernández Marín

25 October 1992 8	Rayo Vallecano	2–0	Atletico	Madrid
	García 3'; Calderón 44'	Report		Stadium: Nuevo Estadio de Vallecas; Referee: Alonso Gómez López

1 November 1992 9	Atletico	3–2	Albacete Balompié	Madrid
	Moya 17'; García 41'; Futre 77'	Report	Soler 71'; Chesa 89'	Stadium: Vicente Calderón Stadium; Referee: José Rubio Valdivieso

8 November 1992 10	Celta Vigo	0–2	Atletico	Vigo
		Report	Alfaro 66'; Futre 89'	Stadium: Balaídos; Referee: Francisco Santamaría Uzqueda

22 November 1992 11	Atletico	2–1	Deportivo La Coruña	Madrid
	Juanito 26', 50'	Report	Bebeto 82'	Stadium: Vicente Calderón Stadium; Referee: José Pajares Paz

28 November 1992 12	Sevilla	1–3	Atletico	Seville
	Šuker 12'	Report	García 13', 27' (pen.); Manolo 81'	Stadium: Ramón Sánchez Pizjuán Stadium; Referee: Celino Gracia Redondo

5 December 1992 13	Atletico	1–1	Valencia	Madrid
	Manolo 18'	Report	Fernando 31'	Stadium: Vicente Calderón Stadium; Referee: José Pérez Sánchez

13 December 1992 14	Osasuna	1–0	Atletico	Pamplona
	Kosecki 74'	Report		Stadium: Estadio El Sadar; Referee: Segundo Bello Blanco

20 December 1992 15	Atletico	0–1	Logroñés	Madrid
		Report	Abadía 48' (pen.)	Stadium: Vicente Calderón Stadium; Referee: Bartolomé Riera Morro

2 January 1993 16	Real Sociedad	1–0	Atletico	San Sebastián
	Oceano 16'	Report		Stadium: Atotxa Stadium; Referee: José Merino Gonzalez

10 January 1993 17	Atletico	1–1	Athletic Bilbao	Madrid
	Sabas 84'	Report	Valverde 31'	Stadium: Vicente Calderón Stadium; Referee: Tomás Jiménez Moreno

16 January 1993 18	Atletico	1–1	Real Madrid	Madrid
	Sabas 14'	Report	Zamorano 27'	Stadium: Vicente Calderón Stadium; Referee: Joaquín Urío Velázquez

24 January 1993 19	Zaragoza	1–0	Atletico	Zaragoza
	Gay 65'	Report		Stadium: La Romareda; Referee: Miguel Marín López

31 January 1993 20	Tenerife	2–2	Atletico	Santa Cruz de Tenerife
	Chano 12'; Estebaranz 19'	Report	García 51', 61'	Stadium: Estadio Heliodoro Rodríguez López; Referee: José Pérez Sánchez

7 February 1993 21	Atletico	2–1	Español	Madrid
	Moya 39'; Manolo 51'	Report	Escaich 44'	Stadium: Vicente Calderón Stadium; Referee: Alonso Gómez López

13 February 1993 22	Barcelona	1–1	Atletico	Barcelona
	Koeman 13' (pen.)	Report	García 58' (pen.)	Stadium: Camp Nou; Referee: José Pajares Paz

21 February 1993 23	Atletico	2–0	Cádiz CF	Madrid
	García 28', 88'	Report		Stadium: Vicente Calderón Stadium; Referee: Francisco Santamaría Uzqueda

7 March 1993 24	Atletico	2–1	Real Oviedo	Madrid
	Schuster 5'; García 63'	Report	Janković 88'	Stadium: Vicente Calderón Stadium; Referee: Juan Ansuátegui Roca

14 March 1993 25	Sporting de Gijón	2–1	Atletico	Gijón
	Juanele 66'; Christiansen 86'	Report	Lukić 84'	Stadium: El Molinón; Referee: Francesc Casajuana Rifà

21 March 1993 26	Atletico	1–0	Rayo Vallecano	Madrid
	García 72'	Report		Stadium: Vicente Calderón Stadium; Referee: Carmelo Rodríguez Martel

25 March 1993 27	Real Burgos	0–2	Atletico	Burgos
		Report	García 43'; Alfaro 53'	Stadium: Estadio El Plantío; Referee: Bartolomé Riera Morro

3 April 1993 28	Albacete Balompié	2–1	Atletico	Albacete
	Fernández 22'; Zalazar 35'	Report	García 11'	Stadium: Estadio Carlos Belmonte; Referee: Ricardo Alfonso Álvarez

11 April 1993 29	Atletico	1–1	Celta Vigo	Madrid
	Lukić 6'	Report	Gil 12'	Stadium: Vicente Calderón Stadium; Referee: Juan Fernández Marín

17 April 1993 30	Deportivo La Coruña	1–1	Atletico	A Coruña
	Bebeto 14' (pen.)	Report	Vizcaíno 70' (pen.)	Stadium: Estadio Riazor; Referee: José Pérez Sánchez

2 May 1993 31	Atletico	1–0	Sevilla	Madrid
	Sabas 76'	Report		Stadium: Vicente Calderón Stadium; Referee: Manuel Díaz Vega

8 May 1993 32	Valencia	1–0	Atletico	Valencia
	Penev 14'	Report		Stadium: Estadio Luis Casanova; Referee: Joaquín Urío Velázquez

15 May 1993 33	Atletico	2–1	Osasuna	Madrid
	Moya 63'; Donato 89'	Report	I. Larrainzar 83'	Stadium: Vicente Calderón Stadium; Referee: Clemente Rivas Fernández

23 May 1993 34	Logroñés	2–1	Atletico	Logroño
	Eraña 44'; Salenko 78'	Report	Donato 74'	Stadium: Estadio Las Gaunas; Referee: Celino Gracia Redondo

30 May 1993 35	Atletico	0–0	Real Sociedad	Madrid
		Report		Stadium: Vicente Calderón Stadium; Referee: Alonso Gómez López

6 June 1993 36	Athletic Bilbao	1–2	Atletico	Bilbao
	Ziganda 76'	Report	García 79', 84'	Stadium: San Mamés Stadium; Referee: José Merino Gonzalez

12 June 1993 37	Real Madrid	1–0	Atletico	Madrid
	Hierro 51'	Report		Stadium: Santiago Bernabéu Stadium; Referee: Juan Ansuátegui Roca

20 June 1993 38	Atletico	2–2	Zaragoza	Madrid
	Juanito 74', 82'	Report	Lizarralde 40'; Moisés 72'	Stadium: Vicente Calderón Stadium; Referee: Juan Fernández Marín

=== Supercopa de España ===
28 October 1992 1	Barcelona	3–1	Atlético Madrid	Barcelona
21:00	Salinas 64'; Begiristain 73', 85'	Report	Ferreira 16'	Stadium: Camp Nou; Attendance: 32,000; Referee: Juan Ansuátegui Roca

11 November 1992 2	Atlético Madrid	1–2 (2–5 agg.)	Barcelona	Madrid
21:00	Manolo 30'	Report	Begiristain 21'; Stoichkov 57'	Stadium: Vicente Calderón Stadium; Attendance: 15,000; Referee: Miguel Marín López

=== Copa del Rey ===
==== Eightfinals ====
4 February 1993 1	Atlético Madrid	0–5	Barcelona	Madrid
		Report	Laudrup 27', 46'; Begiristain 56'; Salinas 75'; Witschge 77'	Stadium: Vicente Calderón Stadium; Referee: José Rubio Valdivieso

17 February 1993 2	Barcelona	6–0 (11–0 agg.)	Atlético Madrid	Barcelona
	Begiristain 4'; Vučević 21', 55'; Ferrer 46'; Salinas 50'; Óscar 52'	Report		Stadium: Camp Nou; Referee: José Merino Gonzalez

=== European Cup Winners' Cup ===
==== First round ====
16 September 1992 1	Maribor (Slovenia)	0–3	(Spain) Atlético Madrid	Maribor
		Report	Alfredo 26'; García 42', 56'	Stadium: Ljudski vrt Attendance: 5,000; Referee: (Turkey) Hasan Ceylan

30 September 1992 2	Atlético Madrid (Spain)	6–1 (9–1 agg.)	(Slovenia) Maribor	Madrid
	Alfaro 17'; Juanito 45'; Sabas 48' (pen.); Gómez 69'; Aguilera 80'; Tarana 85' (o.g.)	Report	Bičakčić 22'	Stadium: Vicente Calderón Stadium; Attendance: 6,500; Referee: (Austria) Gerhard Kapl

==== Second round ====
21 October 1992 1	Trabzonspor (Turkey)	0–2	(Spain) Atlético Madrid	Trabzon
		Report	Futre 38'; Moya 59'	Stadium: Hüseyin Avni Aker Stadium; Attendance: 24,000; Referee: (Russia) Alexey Spirin

4 November 1992 2	Atlético Madrid (Spain)	0–0 (2–0 agg.)	(Turkey) Trabzonspor	Madrid
		Report		Stadium: Vicente Calderón Stadium; Attendance: 8,672; Referee: (France) Rémi Harrel

==== Quarterfinals ====
4 March 1993 1	Olympiacos (Greece)	1–1	(Spain) Atlético Madrid	Athens
	Vaitsis 63'	Report	Moya 10'	Stadium: Olympic Stadium; Attendance: 52,000; Referee: (Sweden) Rune Larsson

18 March 1993 2	Atlético Madrid (Spain)	3–1 (4–2 agg.)	(Greece) Olympiacos	Madrid
	Manolo 10', 58'; Alfaro 67'	Report	Tsalouchidis 59'	Stadium: Vicente Calderón Stadium; Attendance: 50,000; Referee: (Scotland) Jim McCluskey

==== Semifinals ====
6 April 1993 1	Atlético Madrid (Spain)	1–2	(Italy) Parma	Madrid
	García 45'	Report	Asprilla 57', 62'	Stadium: Vicente Calderon; Attendance: 55,000; Referee: (England) Philip Don

22 April 1993 2	Parma (Italy)	0–1 (2–2 (a) agg.)	(Spain) Atlético Madrid	Parma
		Report	Sabas 77'	Stadium: Il Tardini; Attendance: 21,915; Referee: (Germany) Aron Schmidhuber

== Squad statistics ==
=== Appearances and goals ===
No.	Pos	Nat	Player	Total		La Liga		Copa del Rey		Cup Winners' Cup	
No.	Pos	Nat	Player	Apps	Goals	Apps	Goals	Apps	Goals	Apps	Goals
	GK	(Spain) ESP	Abel Resino	33	0	27	0	1	0	5	0
	DF	(Spain) ESP	Tomás	33	0	24+2	0	2	0	4+1	0
	DF	(Spain) ESP	Juanito	31	5	25	4	0	0	4+2	1
	DF	(Spain) ESP	Juanma Lopez	29	0	25	0	0	0	4	0
	DF	(Spain) ESP	Solozabal	35	1	28	1	0	0	7	0
	DF	(Spain) ESP	Toni	39	0	33	0	1	0	5	0
	MF	(Brazil) BRA	Donato	36	4	30+1	4	1	0	4	0
	MF	(Spain) ESP	Vizcaino	35	1	27	1	1	0	7	0
	MF	(Germany) GER	Schuster	30	1	22	1	2	0	6	0
	FW	(Spain) ESP	Manolo	33	7	26+1	5	2	0	3+1	2
	FW	(Mexico) MEX	Luis García	38	20	25+4	17	2	0	6+1	3
	GK	(Spain) ESP	Díaz	15	0	11+1	0	1	0	2	0
	MF	(Spain) ESP	Moya	28	8	17+6	6	0	0	5	2
	MF	(Spain) ESP	Alfredo Santaelena	29	1	15+6	0	2	0	5+1	1
	MF	(Spain) ESP	Carlos Aguilera	24	1	15+5	0	0	0	3+1	1
	DF	(Spain) ESP	Patxi Ferreira	26	0	15+3	0	2	0	5+1	0
	FW	(Spain) ESP	Manolo Alfaro	26	4	9+10	2	0+1	0	3+3	2
	FW	(Spain) ESP	Juan Sabas	21	5	7+8	3	1	0	2+3	2
	FW	(Federal Republic of Yugoslavia) YUG	Vladan Lukić	9	2	6+3	2	0	0	0	0
	DF	(Spain) ESP	Pedro	12	0	6+3	0	1	0	2	0
	MF	(Argentina) ARG	José Luis Villarreal	5	0	4+1	0	0	0	0	0
	MF	(Spain) ESP	Acosta	7	0	4	0	1	0	1+1	0
	MF	(Spain) ESP	Antonio Orejuela	10	0	1+7	0	1	0	0+1	0
	DF	(Spain) ESP	Sánchez	2	0	1+1	0	0	0	0	0
	GK	(Spain) ESP	Mejias	1	0	0	0	0	0	1	0
	MF	(Spain) ESP	Gonzalo	0	0	0	0	0	0	0	0
	FW	(Spain) ESP	Rajado	1	0	0+1	0	0	0	0	0
Out on loan
	DF	(Spain) ESP	Pizo Gómez	1	1	0	0	0	0	1	1
Left club during season
	FW	(Portugal) POR	Paulo Futre	19	7	15+1	6	0	0	3	1

- Source: https://www.bdfutbol.com/es/p/p.php?id=513263
