= Curro Torres =

Spanish footballer and manager (born 1976)

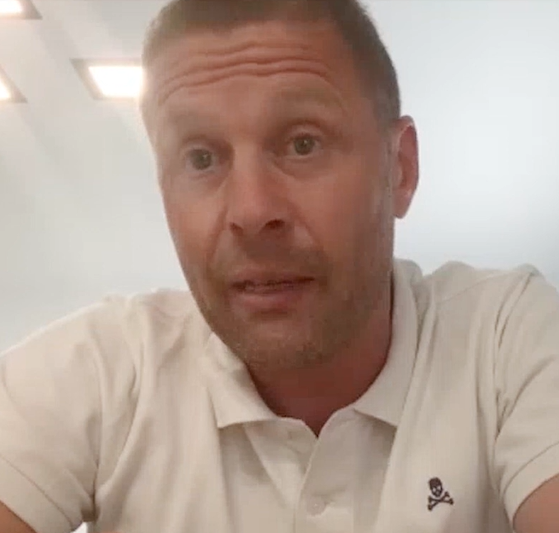
- Torres in 2020

Personal information
- Full name: Cristóbal Emilio Torres Ruiz
- Date of birth: 27 December 1976 (age 49)
- Place of birth: Ahlen, West Germany
- Height: 1.80 m (5 ft 11 in)
- Position: Right-back

Team information
- Current team: Al-Hussein (manager)

Youth career
- Damm
- Gramenet

Senior career*
Years	Team	Apps	(Gls)
1995–1997	Gramenet	53	(5)
1997–1999	Valencia B	62	(10)
1999–2009	Valencia	117	(1)
1999–2000	→ Recreativo (loan)	37	(1)
2000–2001	→ Tenerife (loan)	39	(2)
2007–2008	→ Murcia (loan)	2	(0)
2009–2011	Gimnàstic	0	(0)
Total		310	(19)

International career
2001–2002	Spain	5	(0)

Managerial career
- 2014–2017: Valencia B
- 2017: Lorca
- 2018: Istra 1961
- 2018–2019: Córdoba
- 2019–2020: Lugo
- 2021–2022: Cultural Leonesa
- 2022–2025: Levadia
- 2026: Murcia
- 2026: Liepāja
- 2026–: Al-Hussein
- * Club domestic league appearances and goals

Cristóbal Emilio "Curro" Torres Ruiz (born 27 December 1976) is a former professional footballer who played as a right-back. He is currently manager of Jordanian Pro League club Al-Hussein.

In his career, whose later years were blighted by several injuries, he represented mainly Valencia, helping the team to two La Liga championships (playing 119 matches at that level over eight seasons and scoring once) and the 2004 UEFA Cup. Born in Germany, he appeared for Spain at the 2002 World Cup.

Torres started working as a manager in 2014, spending three years at Valencia B. He also led three teams in the Segunda División and worked in the top leagues of Croatia, Estonia and Jordan.

== Early life ==
Torres was born in Ahlen, North Rhine-Westphalia, West Germany. His parents hailed from Granada, and emigrated to Germany for employment. When their son was still an infant they moved back to Spain, settling in Catalonia.

== Club career ==
Torres began his career with UDA Gramenet before joining Valencia CF in 1997. He was a regular with the B team for two seasons, being loaned out to Recreativo de Huelva and CD Tenerife the next two years; in the latter, alongside Mista and Luis García, he was a key member of the Canary Islands club – coached by Rafael Benítez– that won promotion to La Liga.

Torres then returned to Valencia, where he proceeded to become a key member in the sides that won the national league twice and the 2003–04 UEFA Cup, again under Benítez. He scored his only goal in the top division on 2 May 2004, opening a 2–0 home win against Real Betis.

From early 2005 onwards, however, Torres would be severely hindered by injuries. He did appear in 17 games in the 2006–07 campaign, mainly as a left-back due to Emiliano Moretti's forced absence.

For 2007–08, Torres was loaned to top-flight newcomers Real Murcia CF, where his physical problems resurfaced (two league appearances). Upon their relegation he returned to Valencia, being restricted to two UEFA Cup matches during the season, with even midfielder Hedwiges Maduro being preferred as Miguel's backup; he left the Che in May 2009.

On 27 July 2009, Torres moved to Gimnàstic de Tarragona of Segunda División, playing no minutes whatsoever in the season (league or cup) as Nàstic finished in 18th position. In January of the following year, after the loan acquisitions of Borja Viguera and Álex Bergantiños by the club, the 34-year-old's contract was cancelled.

== International career ==
Courtesy of solid performances whilst at Valencia, Torres made his debut for Spain on 14 November 2001 in a friendly with Mexico in Huelva (1–0 win). He was a member of the 2002 FIFA World Cup squad, appearing in the 3–2 victory against South Africa in the group stage.

== Coaching career ==
On 7 April 2014, Torres returned to Valencia after nearly five years, being appointed manager of the reserves in the Segunda División B. In 2017, he took them to the final round of the play-offs, being knocked out by Albacete Balompié.

On 2 July 2017, Torres was named Lorca FC manager. On 17 December, with the side in the relegation zone, he was sacked.

Torres was appointed at NK Istra 1961 from the Croatian First Football League on 20 September 2018, but left the club after only one month in charge. On 19 November he replaced the fired José Ramón Sandoval at the helm of Córdoba CF, and was dismissed on 25 February 2019 having earned fewer points (ten) than any other second division team during that period.

On 27 December 2019, Torres was named manager of second-tier CD Lugo after the sacking of Eloy Jiménez. He was himself relieved of his duties six months later, with the team second-bottom.

Torres replaced the sacked Ramón González at Cultural y Deportiva Leonesa in the new Primera Federación on 12 December 2021. Having missed the playoffs in 12th, his contract was not renewed past June.

On 11 November 2022, Torres signed a two-year deal at FCI Levadia Tallinn of the Estonian Meistriliiga. On his debut the following 5 March, the season began with a goalless home draw against Pärnu JK Vaprus.

Torres led his team to the double in 2024; in the Cup final, they defeated Paide Linnameeskond 4–2. He left the club on 8 December 2025, as his contract was due to expire.

On 23 February 2026, Torres returned to Murcia 18 years after leaving, now as head coach in the third division. In May, after avoiding relegation, he departed.

== Managerial statistics ==
As of match played 24 May 2026

Managerial record by team and tenure
Team	Nat	From	To	Record								Ref
Team	Nat	From	To	G	W	D	L	GF	GA	GD	Win %	Ref
Valencia B	(Spain)	7 April 2014	2 July 2017	127	52	34	41	168	140	+28	40.94	
Lorca	(Spain)	2 July 2017	17 December 2017	20	4	4	12	18	30	−12	20.00	
Istra 1961	(Croatia)	20 September 2018	28 October 2018	6	2	1	3	12	14	−2	33.33	
Córdoba	(Spain)	19 November 2018	25 February 2019	14	2	4	8	17	25	−8	14.29	
Lugo	(Spain)	27 December 2019	29 June 2020	15	4	4	7	10	18	−8	26.67	
Cultural Leonesa	(Spain)	12 December 2021	30 June 2022	23	7	7	9	37	34	+3	30.43	
Levadia	(Estonia)	1 December 2022	5 December 2025	133	88	24	21	297	115	+182	66.17	
Murcia	(Spain)	23 February 2026	25 May 2026	14	6	3	5	20	16	+4	42.86	
Total				352	165	81	106	579	392	+187	46.88	—

== Honours ==
=== Player ===
Valencia

- La Liga: 2001–02, 2003–04
- Copa del Rey: 1998–99
- UEFA Cup: 2003–04
- UEFA Super Cup: 2004
- UEFA Intertoto Cup: 1998

=== Manager ===
Levadia

- Meistriliiga: 2024
- Estonian Cup: 2023–24
- Estonian Supercup: 2025

Individual

- Estonian Football Manager of the Year: 2024
- Meistriliiga Manager of the Month: April 2023, June/July 2023, March 2024, June/July 2024, March 2025, June/July 2025

== See also ==
- List of Spain international footballers born outside Spain
