= Eloy Jiménez (footballer) =

Spanish footballer & manager (born 1971)

Personal information
- Full name: José Eloy Jiménez Moreno
- Date of birth: 14 June 1971 (age 55)
- Place of birth: Hellín, Spain
- Height: 1.73 m (5 ft 8 in)
- Position: Forward

Senior career*
Years	Team	Apps	(Gls)
1991–1992	Hellín		
1992–1993	Yeclano	22	(4)
1993–1994	Hospitalet	34	(9)
1994–1995	Levante	39	(14)
1995–1996	Las Palmas	40	(24)
1996–1999	Elche	83	(39)
1998–2002	Las Palmas	111	(28)
2002–2003	Córdoba	44	(3)
2003–2005	Castellón	65	(12)
2005–2006	Hellín		
Total		438	(133)

Managerial career
- 2005–2009: Hellín
- 2009–2011: Conquense
- 2012–2013: La Roda
- 2014–2015: UCAM Murcia
- 2016–2017: Mérida
- 2018: Fuenlabrada
- 2019: Lugo
- 2022: Atlético Baleares
- * Club domestic league appearances and goals

José Eloy Jiménez Moreno (born 14 June 1971) is a Spanish retired professional footballer who played as a forward and is a current manager.

His name was most associated with Las Palmas, with whom he played two La Liga seasons at the start of the 2000s. He achieved Segunda División totals of 158 games and 48 goals for that club and Córdoba, as well as 213 appearances and 71 goals across six teams in Segunda División B.

== Playing career ==
Born in Hellín, Albacete, Castile-La Mancha, Jiménez made his senior debuts with hometown's Bakú Hellín Deportivo in 1991, in the regional leagues. After appearing in Segunda División B with Yeclano CF, CE L'Hospitalet, Levante UD and UD Las Palmas (also scoring a career-best 24 goals with the latter), he joined Elche CF in the same division in the 1996 summer, scoring 19 goals as his side were promoted.

On 31 August 1997, aged 26, Jiménez made his professional debut, starting in a 2–1 away loss against CD Numancia. He scored his first goals on 20 September, netting four goals in a 5–0 home routing over CD Logroñés.

Jiménez scored 20 goals in the campaign, and subsequently moved back to Las Palmas, now in the second level. He appeared regularly with the side, winning promotion in 1999–2000 whilst contributing with 13 goals.

Jiménez made his La Liga debut on 10 September 2000, starting in a 3–0 home loss against Deportivo Alavés. He scored his first goal in the competition on the 23rd, netting his side's only in a 1–1 home draw against Real Valladolid.

Jiménez left Las Palmas in January 2002, after appearing rarely in the 2001–02 season, and moved to Córdoba CF in the second division. After featuring regularly he signed for third level's CD Castellón in the 2003 summer.

Jiménez retired in June 2006, aged 35, with his first club Hellín, acting as a player-manager.

== Manager career ==
Immediately after retiring, Jiménez was appointed Hellín's full-time manager, and remained in charge until 2009. In July 2009 he was appointed UB Conquense manager.

Jiménez was relieved from his duties on 5 January 2011. On 1 December of the following year he was appointed at the helm of La Roda CF, and after leading the club to a comfortable 10th place, he resigned.

On 27 June 2014 Jiménez was named UCAM Murcia CF manager. After missing out promotion in the play-offs, he left the club.

On 7 October 2016, Jiménez was appointed as new head coach of Mérida AD. He announced his departure the following 19 May, after leading the club to a fifth place in their group.

On 8 April 2018, Jiménez replaced fired Antonio Calderón at the helm of CF Fuenlabrada also in the third division, staying in charge until the end of the season and missing out promotion in the play-offs.

On 21 April 2019, Jiménez was named manager of second division side CD Lugo, in the place of fired Alberto Monteagudo. He was himself dismissed on 26 December, with the club nearing the relegation places during the season.

== Personal life ==
Jiménez's son, also named Eloy (born 1995), became a midfielder. He never played any higher than the third tier.

== Managerial statistics ==
As of match played 21 May 2022

Managerial record by team and tenure
Team	Nat	From	To	Record								Ref
Team	Nat	From	To	G	W	D	L	GF	GA	GD	Win %	Ref
Hellín	(Spain)	1 July 2005	14 July 2009	152	74	45	33	229	142	+87	48.68	
Conquense	(Spain)	14 July 2009	5 January 2011	59	18	21	20	73	68	+5	30.51	
La Roda	(Spain)	1 December 2012	29 May 2013	26	9	8	9	26	23	+3	34.62	
UCAM Murcia	(Spain)	27 June 2014	22 June 2015	45	18	19	8	49	32	+17	40.00	
Mérida	(Spain)	10 October 2016	19 May 2017	30	16	9	5	46	20	+26	53.33	
Fuenlabrada	(Spain)	8 April 2018	17 July 2018	9	2	5	2	8	7	+1	22.22	
Lugo	(Spain)	21 April 2019	26 December 2019	29	6	15	8	29	37	−8	20.69	
Atlético Baleares	(Spain)	1 March 2022	24 May 2022	12	3	7	2	16	11	+5	25.00	
Total				362	146	129	87	476	340	+136	40.33	—
