= Ángel Brau =

Spanish footballer

Personal information
- Full name: Miguel Ángel Brau Puente
- Date of birth: 24 June 1975 (age 51)
- Place of birth: Cartagena, Spain
- Height: 1.79 m (5 ft 10 in)
- Positions: Centre-back; midfielder

Youth career
- –1992: Cartagena
- 1992–1993: Albacete

Senior career*
Years	Team	Apps	(Gls)
1993–1997	Albacete	5	(0)
1993–1995	→ Hellín (loan)		
1997	→ Hellín (loan)		
1997–1998	Atlético Madrid B	14	(0)
1998	Horadada		
1999–2002	Cartagonova	78	(4)
2002–2004	Figueres	31	(1)
2004–2006	Horadada		
Total		128	(5)
- * Club domestic league appearances and goals

Miguel Ángel Brau Puente (born 24 June 1975), known as Ángel Brau, is a Spanish former footballer who played as a central defender or central midfielder. He made four appearances in La Liga with Albacete Balompié during the 1995–96 season.

== Career ==
=== Albacete Balompié ===
Brau was born in Cartagena in the Region of Murcia, and began his career with the youth wing of local side Cartagena FC, before jumping ship to La Liga outfit Albacete Balompié in 1992. In 1993, he was sent to Albacete's farm team, Hellín Deportivo, and helped them earn promotion to the Tercera División in his first season. He remained at Hellín in 1994–95, and they had another successful season, winning their group and qualifying for the promotion play-off. They finished second in their play-off group, losing to San Pedro.

Brau was recalled to Albacete for the 1995–96 La Liga campaign, and made his debut in the opening match of the season, a 3–0 away loss to Sporting de Gijón at El Molinón on 2 September. This was a false dawn, however, and Brau was used sparingly, having to wait until 27 March for his next appearance, in a 3–2 away win over Real Betis at Estadio Benito Villamarín. This marked the start of a short run in the team, and he made his home debut three days later in a 1–0 defeat by Barcelona at Estadio Carlos Belmonte. He finished the season with four appearances, also playing in another 1–0 loss to Valencia at Mestalla Stadium on 7 April. Albacete were relegated at the end of the season, via a play-off with Extremadura.

Brau played just once in the second tier the following season, being withdrawn after less than half an hour of a 2–2 home draw with Real Madrid B in favour of Manolo Salvador. He was sent back to Hellín in the second half of the season, before leaving the club completely in the summer.

=== Atlético Madrid ===
Brau joined Atlético Madrid in the summer of 1997, playing exclusively with their B team, who were rivals of Albacete in the Segunda División. He made his debut on the first day of the season, in a 1–1 home draw with Las Palmas at Estadio Cerro del Espino on 31 August, coming off the bench in place of Quinton Fortune with 25 minutes to play. He was used primarily as a substitute, and had to wait until 6 December for his first start, which came in a 1–0 defeat at the hands of Rayo Vallecano at Estadio Teresa Rivero.

Brau's solitary home start came against his former employers, Albacete, on 21 December, a match which the hosts won 2–0. He then didn't play again until the final two matches of the season, the first of which was the return fixture against Albacete on 10 May, which ended 1–1. In the final match, at home to Eibar six days later, he played the last 25 minutes of a 2–0 victory. With no realistic prospect of ever being promoted to Atlético's first team, he left the club at the end of the season.

=== Horadada and Cartagonova ===
Brau joined Horadada in the Tercera División at the start of the 1998–99 season, but lasted only half a year before returning to his roots in Cartagena. Cartagena FC, the club he had played with as a youngster, had ceased playing in 1997, and the city's leading club was now Cartagonova FC, which had been founded in 1995, who were playing in Segunda División B. In his first full season with the club, he played 23 matches, and even scored a rare goal. This came in a 3–3 away draw with Gramenet on 4 January. 2000–01 saw only 21 appearances, but the following season was undoubtedly his best with the club.

Brau played 34 times that year, scoring three times. However, he left the club at the end of the season, with his final appearance coming in a 1–0 loss to Mallorca B at Estadio Cartagonova on 10 May.

=== Later career ===
For 2002–03, Brau joined another Segunda División B side, Figueres. He made his debut in a 1–1 away draw with Castellón at Nou Estadi Castàlia on 29 September, and kept his place for the 3–1 home win over Orihuela five days later. He played 16 times in the league that year, scoring a single goal, which came in a 2–1 home win over Espanyol B on 11 May. Figueres finished the season in 16th place, meaning they would have to play a relegation playoff.

Brau played in both legs against Calahorra as Figueres won 3–0 on aggregate to retain their place in the third tier. The following season, which would be his last for the club, Brau made 15 appearances. Fittingly, his last match for the club, on 16 May, came at the same venue against the same club as his first: away to Castellón. He came on for Miguel Salas with 25 minutes to play in the 2–0 loss. He then rejoined Horadada, with whom he completed two further Tercera División campaigns before retiring in 2006.

== Personal life ==
Brau's father, also called Miguel Ángel, was a footballer too. Like his son, Brau senior played for Horadada at the end of his career, including a season in Segunda División B in 1992–93. His brother, Salva, younger by two and a half years, was his teammate at Cartagonova during the 1999–2000 season. In 2020, his son became the third Miguel Ángel Brau to play football professionally, with Recreativo Granada in Segunda División B.

== Honours ==
Hellín Deportivo

- Primera Autonómica Preferente de Castilla-La Mancha: 1993–94
- Tercera División: 1994–95

Cartagonova

- Segunda División B runners-up: 1998–99

== Career statistics ==
As of 18 January 2021

Club	Season	League			Other		Total	
Club	Season	Division	Apps	Goals	Apps	Goals	Apps	Goals
Albacete Balompié	1993–94	La Liga	0	0	–	–	0	0
Albacete Balompié	1994–95	La Liga	0	0	0	0	0	0
Albacete Balompié	1995–96	La Liga	4	0	0	0	4	0
Albacete Balompié	1996–97	Segunda División	1	0	–	–	1	0
Albacete Balompié	Total		5	0	0	0	5	0
Atlético Madrid B	1997–98	Segunda División	14	0	–	–	14	0
Cartagonova	1999–2000	Segunda División B	23	1	–	–	23	1
Cartagonova	2000–01	Segunda División B	21	0	–	–	21	0
Cartagonova	2001–02	Segunda División B	34	3	–	–	34	3
Cartagonova	Total		78	4	0	0	78	4
Figueres	2002–03	Segunda División B	16	1	2	0	18	1
Figueres	2003–04	Segunda División B	15	0	–	–	15	0
Figueres	Total		31	1	2	0	33	1
Career total			128	5	2	0	130	5

1. Appearances in the 2002–03 Segunda División B relegation playoff
