= Xavi Bartolo =

Spanish footballer and manager (born 1968)

Personal information
- Full name: Xavier Bartolo Moliné
- Date of birth: 7 October 1968 (age 58)
- Place of birth: Bellver de Cerdanya, Spain
- Height: 1.75 m (5 ft 9 in)
- Position: Forward

Team information
- Current team: Atlètic Lleida (sporting director)

Youth career
- Lleida

Senior career*
Years	Team	Apps	(Gls)
1987–1990	Lleida B		
1989–1995	Lleida	95	(16)
1990–1991	→ Fraga (loan)	36	(21)
1995–1996	Levante	10	(0)
1996	Leganés	8	(0)
1996–1998	Gimnàstic	31	(5)
Total		180	(42)

Managerial career
- 2009: Recreativo (assistant)
- 2010–2011: Gimnàstic (assistant)
- 2011: Cartagena (assistant)
- 2014: EF Valls (youth)
- 2017–2018: Reus (assistant)
- 2018: Reus (interim)
- 2018–2019: Reus
- 2019: Gimnàstic
- 2023–2024: Atlètic Lleida
- * Club domestic league appearances and goals

Xavier "Xavi" Bartolo Moliné (born 7 October 1968) is a Spanish football manager and former player who played as a forward. He is the current sporting director of CE Atlètic Lleida.

== Playing career ==
Born in Bellver de Cerdanya, Lleida, Catalonia, Bartolo spent several campaigns with the reserves before making his first-team debut during the 1989–90 season, achieving promotion from Segunda División B. After a one-year loan to Tercera División side UD Fraga, he returned to Lleida in July 1991 and was definitely promoted to the main squad.

Bartolo made his professional debut on 1 September 1991, starting in a 0–3 Segunda División away loss against Celta de Vigo. Fourteen days later he scored his first goals in the category, netting a brace in a 3–1 win at UE Figueres.

Bartolo achieved promotion to La Liga in the 1992–93 campaign, scoring a career-best eight goals in 29 appearances. He made his first appearance in the main category on 5 September 1993, starting in a 0–1 away defeat to CD Tenerife.

Bartolo left Lleida in 1995, and signed for Levante UD in the third division. The following January, he joined second level side CD Leganés, but featured rarely.

In 1996 Bartolo agreed to a contract with Gimnàstic de Tarragona, and retired with the club in 1998 at the age of just 30.

== Coaching career ==
In June 2009, Bartolo was named assistant of Javi López at Recreativo de Huelva, after previously working for Lleida, Hércules CF, Gimnàstic and CD Castellón as a fitness coach. He was also Luis César Sampedro's assistant at Nàstic before moving to FC Cartagena and reuniting with López.

Bartolo subsequently worked as a fitness coach for Real Murcia before being appointed manager of EF Valls' youth setup on 4 March 2014. In July, he joined CF Reus Deportiu as a fitness coach, and became the assistant manager of Aritz López Garai in 2017.

In May 2018, Bartolo replaced López Garai at the helm of Reus as the latter had a heart surgery. of On 23 June, he was definitely appointed manager. Halfway through the 2018–19 season, Bartolo, along with the rest of the Reus players and staff, left the club after it was expelled by the LFP.

On 16 May 2019, Bartolo returned to Gimnàstic after being named manager for the 2019–20 campaign. He was dismissed on 17 November, with the club having spent three weeks in the relegation zone.

== Managerial statistics ==
As of 15 September 2019

Managerial record by team and tenure
Team	Nat	From	To	Record								Ref
Team	Nat	From	To	G	W	D	L	GF	GA	GD	Win %	Ref
Reus (interim)	(Spain)	2 May 2018	13 May 2018	2	1	1	0	2	1	+1	50.00	
Reus	(Spain)	23 June 2018	5 February 2019	23	6	6	11	19	31	−12	26.09	
Gimnàstic	(Spain)	17 June 2019	Present	4	1	1	2	5	8	−3	25.00	
Total				29	8	8	13	26	40	−14	27.59	—
