= Alberto Monteagudo =

Spanish footballer (born 1974)

Personal information
- Full name: Alberto Jiménez Monteagudo
- Date of birth: 27 September 1974 (age 52)
- Place of birth: Valdeganga, Spain
- Height: 1.84 m (6 ft 0 in)
- Position: Defensive midfielder

Youth career
- Albacete

Senior career*
Years	Team	Apps	(Gls)
1992–1994	Albacete B		
1992–1996	Albacete	9	(0)
1995	→ Corralejo (loan)	16	(0)
1996	L'Hospitalet	17	(1)
1996–1997	Manchego	28	(5)
1997–1999	Recreativo	67	(2)
1999–2000	Mérida	12	(1)
2000–2002	Murcia	55	(2)
2002–2003	Las Palmas	37	(2)
2003–2004	Algeciras	30	(1)
2004–2005	Xerez	18	(0)
2005	Numancia	5	(0)
2006–2007	Las Palmas	9	(0)
2008	Vecindario	14	(0)
2008–2009	Lucena	19	(1)
Total		336	(15)

Managerial career
- 2009–2010: Lucena
- 2010–2011: Cultural Leonesa
- 2012: Badajoz
- 2012: Cádiz
- 2013–2014: La Roda
- 2016–2018: Cartagena
- 2018: Apollon Smyrnis
- 2018–2019: Lugo
- 2019–2020: Recreativo
- 2022: Linense
- 2024: UCAM Murcia
- * Club domestic league appearances and goals

Alberto Jiménez Monteagudo (born 27 September 1974) is a retired Spanish footballer who played as a defensive midfielder, and is a manager.

He amassed Segunda División totals of 197 matches and seven goals over the course of ten seasons, representing seven different clubs, aside from nine appearances in La Liga with Albacete.

== Playing career ==
Born in Valdeganga, Albacete, Castile-La Mancha, Monteagudo was an Albacete Balompié youth graduate. On 22 October 1992, aged just 18, he made his first-team debut by coming on as a half-time substitute for Juan Antonio Chesa in a 5–1 home routing of Utebo FC, for the season's Copa del Rey.

Monteagudo made his La Liga debut on 16 October 1994, starting in a 2–3 away loss against Sporting de Gijón. In January 1995, after being rarely used, he moved to Segunda División B side CD Corralejo on loan until June.

Upon returning, Monteagudo again featured sparingly before signing a permanent contract with CE L'Hospitalet in January 1996, with the side also in the third division. He subsequently represented CD Manchego and Recreativo de Huelva in the same level, achieving promotion to Segunda División with the latter in 1998.

Monteagudo scored his first professional goal on 30 January 1999, netting the opener in a 1–1 home draw against SD Compostela for the second division championship. In July, he moved to fellow league team CP Mérida, appearing sparingly during his one-season spell and leaving the club the following summer as it folded.

Monteagudo subsequently resumed his career in the second level, representing Real Murcia, UD Las Palmas (two stints), Algeciras CF, Xerez CD and CD Numancia. On 31 January 2008, aged already 33, he moved to UD Vecindario in the third tier, featuring regularly before moving to fellow league side Lucena CF in July, and retiring the following March.

== Managerial career ==
Immediately after retiring Monteagudo was named manager of Lucena, for the final eight matches of the season. He managed to avoid relegation by achieving nine points out of 24, and took the club to a sixth position in 2009–10.

On 5 July 2010, Monteagudo was named manager of Cultural y Deportiva Leonesa, also in the third division. Roughly one year later, after suffering administrative relegation, he left the club.

Monteagudo was hired by CD Badajoz on 10 April 2012, but left in July after suffering another drop. On 18 July, he was named at the helm of Cádiz CF, but was sacked on 19 November after gaining 16 points from the first 13 games of the season.

On 4 June 2013, Monteagudo took over La Roda CF still in the third level, being relieved from his duties the following 25 March, after winning only eight of 31 matches. On 3 February 2016, after more than two years without a club, he was named FC Cartagena manager.

On 28 April 2016, Monteagudo renewed his contract for a further campaign. In 2017–18, he led the club to the play-offs but missed out promotion, and subsequently terminated his contract on 3 July 2018.

On 10 September 2018, Monteagudo moved abroad for the first time in his career, after being appointed manager of Super League Greece side Apollon Smyrnis, but was dismissed the following 2 October. Late in the month, he replaced sacked Javi López at the helm of second division side CD Lugo, but was himself dismissed the following 20 April.

On 1 July 2019, Monteagudo was hired for two seasons at Recreativo de Huelva in the third tier. The following 11 February he was dismissed, with the team in 13th and closer in points to the relegation zone than the promotion play-offs.

== Managerial statistics ==
As of match played 5 May 2024

Managerial record by team and tenure
Team	Nat	From	To	Record								Ref
Team	Nat	From	To	G	W	D	L	GF	GA	GD	Win %	Ref
Lucena	(Spain)	22 April 2009	6 July 2010	46	16	16	14	71	49	+22	34.78	
Cultural Leonesa	(Spain)	6 July 2010	17 July 2011	38	9	16	13	42	48	−6	23.68	
Badajoz	(Spain)	10 April 2012	13 July 2012	4	3	0	1	11	4	+7	75.00	
Cádiz	(Spain)	13 July 2012	19 November 2012	15	5	4	6	21	19	+2	33.33	
La Roda	(Spain)	4 June 2013	25 March 2014	31	8	8	15	33	38	−5	25.81	
Cartagena	(Spain)	3 February 2016	3 July 2018	107	51	34	22	131	93	+38	47.66	
Apollon Smyrnis	(Greece)	10 September 2018	2 October 2018	4	0	0	4	2	8	−6	0.00	
Lugo	(Spain)	28 October 2018	20 April 2019	26	5	11	10	26	34	−8	19.23	
Recreativo	(Spain)	1 July 2019	11 February 2020	27	8	9	10	30	31	−1	29.63	
Linense	(Spain)	20 February 2022	16 October 2022	22	5	7	10	21	29	−8	22.73	
UCAM Murcia	(Spain)	14 February 2024	4 June 2024	12	5	3	4	20	12	+8	41.67	
Career Total				332	115	108	109	408	365	+43	34.64	—
