= Óscar Valles =

Spanish footballer and manager

Personal information
- Full name: Óscar Garcia Valles
- Date of birth: 11 February 1973 (age 53)
- Position: Midfielder

Team information
- Current team: CD Victoria de Tazacorte

Senior career*
Years	Team	Apps	(Gls)
1997–1998	Atletico Madrileño		
1998	Dundee United	1	(0)
1998–1999	Penafiel	13	(0)
- * Club domestic league appearances and goals

Óscar Garcia Valles (born 11 February 1973) is a Spanish former footballer who currently manages Spanish side CD Victoria de Tazacorte.

Valles played for Dundee United F.C. during the 1997–98 season.

== See also ==
- 1997–98 Dundee United F.C. season
- Football in Thailand
- List of football clubs in Thailand
