= Josico =

Spanish footballer (born 1975)

Personal information
- Full name: José Joaquín Moreno Verdú
- Date of birth: 6 January 1975 (age 51)
- Place of birth: Hellín, Spain
- Height: 1.77 m (5 ft 10 in)
- Position: Defensive midfielder

Youth career
- Albacete

Senior career*
Years	Team	Apps	(Gls)
1994–1995	Hellín		
1995–1998	Albacete	97	(7)
1998–2002	Las Palmas	129	(12)
2002–2008	Villarreal	152	(5)
2008–2009	Fenerbahçe	14	(0)
2009–2011	Las Palmas	37	(2)
Total		429	(26)

International career
1996–1997	Spain U21	7	(1)

Managerial career
- 2013–2014: Las Palmas (youth)
- 2014: Las Palmas
- 2014–2015: Las Palmas B
- 2015–2016: Jumilla
- 2017: Atlético Baleares
- 2017–2018: Elche
- 2019–2020: S.S. Reyes
- 2021: Socuéllamos
- * Club domestic league appearances and goals

José Joaquín Moreno Verdú (born 6 January 1975), known as Josico, is a Spanish former professional footballer who played as a defensive midfielder. He is currently a manager.

His 17-year senior career was mainly associated with Las Palmas and Villarreal (six years apiece), and he amassed La Liga totals of 240 matches and 13 goals over nine seasons.

== Playing career ==
Born in Hellín, Province of Albacete, Josico made his debut in La Liga with Albacete Balompié in the 1995–96 season, immediately after joining from local amateurs Hellín Deportivo. He played 28 matches (scoring twice), but his team was relegated after five consecutive years in the top division; his first game in the competition occurred on 18 November 1995, featuring the full 90 minutes in a 3–0 away loss against FC Barcelona.

Josico went on to represent UD Las Palmas for four seasons, joining Villarreal CF for the 2002–03 campaign, where he played a major part in the club's domestic and European consolidation: in 2004–05 the player made 29 appearances – 28 as starter – as the Valencian Community side finished third, as well as being their captain.

Deemed surplus to requirements by Villarreal boss Manuel Pellegrini, Josico joined Fenerbahçe S.K. on 28 August 2008 as the Süper Lig side was coached by former Spain manager Luis Aragonés. After just one season in Turkey, where he was used sparingly, he was released, and quickly signed with one of his first clubs, Las Palmas in the Segunda División, at the same time of former teammate Antonio Guayre.

In late May 2011, after having contributed 25 matches to help his team to avoid relegation, the 36-year-old Josico announced his retirement from professional football. He returned to the Canary Islands the following year, being charged with watching the opposing teams.

== Coaching career ==
Josico was appointed Las Palmas' first-team manager on 26 May 2014, replacing the fired Sergio Lobera after a 2–3 home loss against Recreativo de Huelva. He still managed to lead the side to the sixth position in the regular season, then ousted Sporting de Gijón 2–0 on aggregate in the top-flight promotion playoffs.

On 3 July 2014, Josico moved to the Canarians' reserve team in the Segunda División B. In the following years, he continued working in the lower leagues.

== Managerial statistics ==
As of 22 December 2019

Managerial record by team and tenure
Team	From	To	Record								Ref
Team	From	To	G	W	D	L	GF	GA	GD	Win %	Ref
Las Palmas	26 May 2014	3 July 2014	6	3	2	1	6	5	+1	50.00	
Las Palmas B	3 July 2014	9 March 2015	28	8	6	14	41	45	−4	28.57	
Jumilla	10 November 2015	15 February 2016	13	5	3	5	14	20	−6	38.46	
Atlético Baleares	15 March 2017	13 June 2017	13	8	3	2	19	9	+10	61.54	
Elche	20 November 2017	27 February 2018	13	5	4	4	17	13	+4	38.46	
S.S. Reyes	8 November 2019	Present	8	2	1	5	11	14	−3	25.00	
Total			81	31	19	31	108	106	+2	38.27	—

== Honours ==
Las Palmas

- Segunda División: 1999–2000

Villarreal

- UEFA Intertoto Cup: 2003, 2004

Spain U21

- UEFA European Under-21 Championship: 1998
