= Moacir (footballer, born 1970) =

Brazilian footballer (1970–2024)

Personal information
- Full name: Moacir Rodrigues Santos
- Date of birth: 21 March 1970
- Place of birth: Timóteo, Minas Gerais, Brazil
- Date of death: 20 July 2024 (aged 54)
- Place of death: Belo Horizonte, Minas Gerais, Brazil
- Position: Midfielder

Senior career*
Years	Team	Apps	(Gls)
1988–1992	Atlético Mineiro	64	(1)
1993	Corinthians		
1993–1994	Atlético Madrid	11	(1)
1994	Corinthians		
1994–1996	Sevilla	30	(2)
1996	Atlético Mineiro	16	(3)
1997	Portuguesa	21	(0)
1998	Verdy Kawasaki	26	(0)
1999–2002	Ituano		
2003	Uberaba		

International career
1990–1991	Brazil	6	(1)
- * Club domestic league appearances and goals

Moacir Rodrigues Santos (21 March 1970 – 20 July 2024), known as Moacir, was a Brazilian footballer who played as a midfielder for the Brazil national team.

Moacir died in Belo Horizonte on 20 July 2024, at the age of 54.

== Career statistics ==
Appearances and goals by national team and year
National team	Year	Apps	Goals
Brazil	1990	3	0
Brazil	1991	3	1
Total		6	1
