= Pizo Gómez =

Spanish footballer

Personal information
- Full name: José Antonio Gómez Ramón
- Date of birth: 7 January 1964 (age 62)
- Place of birth: Eibar, Spain
- Height: 1.82 m (6 ft 0 in)
- Positions: Defender; midfielder

Youth career
- –1983: SD Eibar

Senior career*
Years	Team	Apps	(Gls)
1983–1985	Bilbao Athletic	68	(8)
1984	→ Lleida (loan)	37	(4)
1985–1987	Athletic Bilbao	37	(0)
1987–1989	Osasuna	66	(7)
1989–1994	Atlético Madrid	75	(1)
1992	→ Espanyol (loan)	16	(3)
1992–1993	→ Rayo Vallecano (loan)	30	(0)
1994–1996	Osasuna	57	(3)
1996–1997	SD Eibar	13	(0)
1997–1998	CD Izarra	20	(1)
Total		224	(11)
- * Club domestic league appearances and goals

José Antonio Gómez Ramón (born 7 January 1964), known as Pizo Gómez, is a Spanish retired footballer who played as a defender or midfielder.

He had a successful career in La Liga in the 1980s and 90s, making over 200 appearances in the competition, including a five-year stint with Atlético Madrid.

== Career ==
Gómez was born in Eibar in the Gipuzkoa province of the Basque Country, and was a member of the youth teams of SD Eibar. However, he turned professional in 1983 with the significantly more famous local team Athletic Bilbao. He spent two years in the reserve team, which included a brief loan spell with Lleida, before making his debut for the senior team in 1985. This came on 13 October in a 3–3 home draw against Real Valladolid at the San Mamés Stadium, which would be his only appearance of the season. His second full season with Bilbao was much more successful, making 40 appearances in all competitions. He also made his European debut, in a 2–0 home UEFA Cup win against East Germany's 1. FC Magdeburg on 17 September 1986. He also scored his first and only goal for Bilbao in this match. He played in all four matches in the competition as Bilbao were knocked out by Beveren of Belgium in the second round.

At the end of the season, Gómez left Bilbao and joined Osasuna. His debut for his new club was on 6 September 1987, in a 0–0 away draw with Real Sociedad at the Atotxa Stadium. He made his home debut a week later in a 4–1 win against Real Valladolid at the El Sadar Stadium. He had a successful season, making 33 appearances, and he scored Osasuna's goal in a 3–1 defeat to Atlético Madrid at the Vicente Calderón Stadium on 6 December. The following season was equally successful, as he made a further 33 appearances, and netted an impressive six goals.

This impressive form led to a move to Spanish giants Atlético Madrid in 1989. He made his debut on 2 September in a 3–1 win at Valencia's Mestalla Stadium, and his first appearance at the Vicente Calderón Stadium came a week later in a 1–0 win over Cádiz CF. He made 37 appearances in a strong first season for Los Rojiblancos, but he struggled to maintain this success. 17 games the following year was followed by just two in 1991–92, and by January of that season he was out of favour to such an extent that he was sent out on loan to Espanyol.

He made his Espanyol debut on 26 January in a 2–0 home win over Real Sociedad at the Sarrià Stadium, and he scored his first goal on 15 March in a 3–1 home win against Cádiz CF. His loan stint proved successful, as he made 16 appearances and scored 3 times before returning to Atleti.

He was hopeful of securing a first team place at Atlético, but appeared just once before being sent out on loan again. However, this appearance did allow him to score his first goal for the club, in a 6–1 Cup Winners' Cup demolition of Slovenia's Maribor at the Vicente Calderón on 30 September 1992. His loan began in October, this time to fellow Madrid club Rayo Vallecano, and lasted until the end of the season. His first game for the club was a 1–1 draw at Real Oviedo's Estadio Carlos Tartiere on 18 October. He made his home debut came a week later, coincidentally against his parent club. The match at Nuevo Estadio de Vallecas ended with an excellent 2–0 win for the hosts. He ultimately made 30 appearances for Rayo before returning once again to Madrid at the end of the season.

This time he was able to fight for a first team spot, and made 31 appearances during 1993–94, scoring once. However, this would prove to be his last season in La Liga, as he returned to Osasuna in the summer of 1994, who were by now competing in the Segunda División. He spent two years with the Pamplona club, before joining Segunda División rivals and hometown club SD Eibar in 1996. After one year with Eibar, he finished his career with a season playing in Segunda División B with CD Izarra, retiring in 1998.

== Personal life ==
Gómez currently lives in Pamplona, and is married with two daughters, named Marta and Patricia. In 2017, he was caught up in a fraud scandal known as Caso ERE, and was fined €640,000 as a result.
