= José Ignacio Soler =

Spanish footballer and coach

Personal information
- Full name: José Ignacio Soler Bayona
- Date of birth: 30 October 1967 (age 58)
- Place of birth: Zaragoza, Spain
- Height: 1.79 m (5 ft 10 1/2 in)
- Position: Midfielder

Youth career
- Zaragoza

Senior career*
Years	Team	Apps	(Gls)
1987–1988	Zaragoza B	9	(0)
1988–1990	Real Madrid B	26	(0)
1990–1993	Extremadura	90	(8)
1993–1994	Badajoz	15	(1)
1994–1995	Atlético Madrid	15	(1)
1995	→ Osasuna (loan)	13	(0)
1995–1996	→ Atlético Marbella (loan)	13	(0)
1996–1997	Extremadura	39	(0)
1997–1998	Elche	22	(1)
Total		242	(11)

Managerial career
- 2002–2004: Casetas
- 2004: Mirandés
- 2005–2006: Villanueva
- 2007–2009: Andorra
- 2010–2011: Ejea
- 2012: Robres
- 2013: Robres
- * Club domestic league appearances and goals

José Ignacio Soler Bayona (born 30 October 1967) is a Spanish retired footballer who played as a central midfielder, and a current coach.

== Club career ==
Born in Zaragoza, Aragon, Soler graduated with Real Zaragoza's youth setup, and made his senior debuts with the reserves in Segunda División B. In 1988, he joined Real Madrid, being assigned to the B-team in Segunda División.

Soler made his debut as a professional on 15 October 1988, coming on as a second half substitute in a 2–3 home loss against CE Sabadell FC. He subsequently spent several seasons with the side in the second and third levels.

In the 1990 summer Soler moved to CF Extremadura, also in the third division. After two seasons he moved to CD Badajoz, after failing to achieve any promotions with the former; he scored his first professional goal with the latter, netting the second in a 6–2 away routing over CD Leganés on 30 October 1993.

In December 1993 Soler joined La Liga club Atlético Madrid. He made his debut in the competition on 9 January of the following year, starting in a 0–0 home draw against UE Lleida.

On 27 March 1994 Soler scored his first goal in the main category of Spanish football, netting the game's only in an away win against CA Osasuna. In January 1995, after appearing sparingly with Atleti, he was loaned to the former until June.

Soler subsequently represented CA Marbella also in a temporary deal before rescinding his link with the Madrid outfit in the 1996 summer. He immediately returned to Extremadura, with his side now in the top division, and was an ever-present figure as his side were relegated.

In 1997 Soler signed for Elche CF in the second level. After appearing regularly during the campaign, again suffering relegation, he retired.

== Coaching career ==
After his retirement Soler joined UD Casetas as a director of football. In 2002, he was appointed manager of the club, and achieved a promotion to the third level in his first campaign.

After being immediately relegated, Soler was named CD Mirandés manager in 2004. He remained in charge for only ten matches, and was subsequently sacked.

Soler would subsequently resume his managerial career in the lower levels, taking charge of Villanueva CF, Andorra CF and CD Robres (two stints). On 10 July 2013 he returned to his first club Zaragoza, now as a director of the youth setup.
