= Javi Luke =

Spanish footballer (born 1968)

Personal information
- Full name: Francisco Javier Luke Bermúdez
- Date of birth: 20 February 1968 (age 58)
- Place of birth: Barakaldo, Spain
- Height: 1.77 m (5 ft 10 in)
- Position: Forward

Senior career*
Years	Team	Apps	(Gls)
1985–1986	Retuerto Sport		
1986–1989	Santurtzi	0	(0)
1989–1990	Sestao	34	(8)
1990–1995	Athletic Bilbao	82	(12)
1993–1994	→ Osasuna (loan)	16	(3)
1995–1996	Almería	21	(3)
1996–1997	Albacete Balompié	18	(0)
1997–1999	Burgos	40	(3)
1999–2000	Barakaldo	27	(2)
- * Club domestic league appearances and goals

Francisco Javier Luke Bermúdez (born 20 February 1968), known as Javi Luke or Luke, is a Spanish former professional footballer who played as a forward.

== Career ==
Luke was born in Barakaldo. He spent five seasons in La Liga with Athletic Bilbao between 1990 and 1995, scoring 18 goals in 101 appearances across all competitions. In the 1991–92 Copa del Rey he scored six goals, a feat that remained unmatched until the 2023–24 season when Asier Villalibre contributed six goals to Athletic's title-winning run. His time with Athletic Bilbao was interrupted by a season-long loan at Osasuna in the 1993–94 season.

== Career statistics ==
Appearances and goals by club, season and competition
Club	Season	League			Copa del Rey		Other		Total	
Club	Season	Division	Apps	Goals	Apps	Goals	Apps	Goals	Apps	Goals
Santurtzi	1986–87		0	0	1	0	–		1	0
Sestao	1989–90	Segunda División	34	8	3	0	–		37	8
Athletic Bilbao	1990–91	La Liga	24	7	5	0	–		29	7
Athletic Bilbao	1991–92	La Liga	29	4	10	6	–		39	10
Athletic Bilbao	1992–93	La Liga	22	1	2	0	–		23	1
Athletic Bilbao	1993–94	La Liga	0	0	0	0	–		0	0
Athletic Bilbao	1994–95	La Liga	7	0	2	0	–		9	0
Athletic Bilbao	Total		82	12	19	6	0	0	101	18
Osasuna (loan)	1993–94	La Liga	16	3	2	0	–		18	3
Almería	1995–96	Segunda División	21	3	0	0	–		21	3
Albacete Balompié	1995–96	La Liga	14	0	1	0	–		15	0
Albacete Balompié	1996–97	Segunda División	4	0	0	0	–		4	0
Albacete Balompié	Total		18	0	1	0	0	0	19	0
Burgos	1997–98	Segunda División B	12	0	1	1	–		13	1
Burgos	1998–99	Segunda División B	28	3	0	0	3 (Note: One appearance in promotion play-offs, two appearances in Copa Federación)	0	31	3
Burgos	Total		40	3	1	1	3	0	44	4
Barakaldo	1999–2000	Segunda División B	27	2	3	0	5 (Note: Appearances in promotion play-offs)	1	35	3
Career total			238	31	30	7	8	1	276	39
