= Jorge Rajado =

Spanish footballer (born 2006)

Personal information
- Full name: Jorge Rajado Ruiz
- Date of birth: 16 May 2006 (age 20)
- Place of birth: Madrid, Spain
- Positions: Winger; attacking midfielder

Team information
- Current team: Real Madrid C
- Number: 25

Youth career
- 2016–2026: Atlético Madrid

Senior career*
Years	Team	Apps	(Gls)
2026–	Real Madrid C	0	(0)

International career
2022	Spain U16	2	(0)
2022–	Spain U17	14	(2)
- * Club domestic league appearances and goals as of 11 October 2023

Jorge Rajado Ruiz (born 16 May 2006) is a Spanish professional footballer who currently plays as a winger or attacking midfielder for Real Madrid C.

== Club career ==
Born in Madrid, Rajado joined the academy of La Liga side Atlético Madrid in 2016, before going on to sign his first professional contract with the club in May 2022, days after turning sixteen. He established himself as a prolific goal-scorer in the Atlético Madrid academy, despite being a winger, and finished the 2022–23 season with twenty-five goals in only twenty-four games. The following season, in October 2023, he was named by English newspaper The Guardian as one of the best players born in 2006 worldwide.

== International career ==
Rajado has represented Spain at youth level.
