= Manolo Alfaro =

Spanish footballer and manager (born 1971)

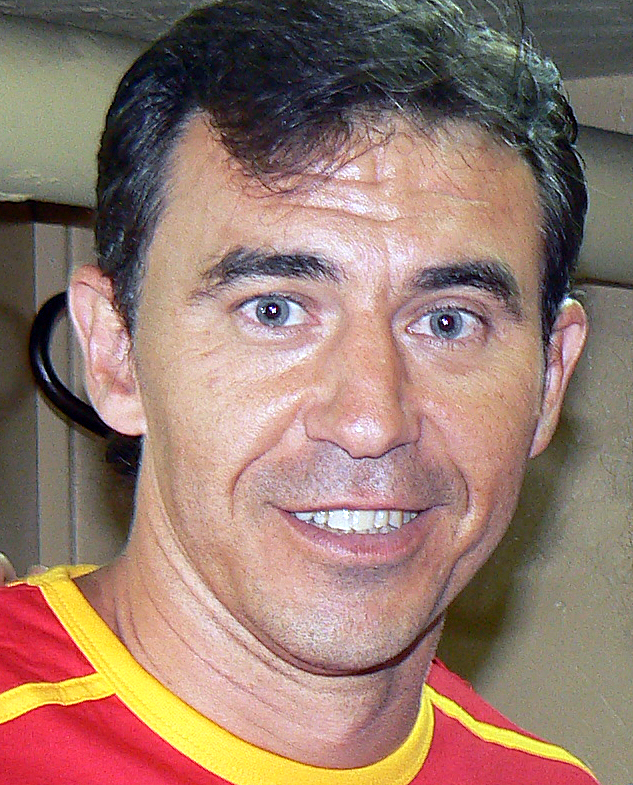
- Alfaro in 2010

Personal information
- Full name: Manuel Alfaro de la Torre
- Date of birth: 19 January 1971 (age 55)
- Place of birth: Alcalá de Henares, Spain
- Height: 1.77 m (5 ft 10 in)
- Position: Striker

Youth career
- Alcalá

Senior career*
Years	Team	Apps	(Gls)
1988–1989	Alcalá	4	(1)
1989–1992	Atlético B	68	(34)
1990–1994	Atlético Madrid	24	(3)
1993–1994	→ Valladolid (loan)	5	(0)
1994–1998	Hércules	133	(42)
1998–2000	Villarreal	49	(13)
2000–2001	Murcia	14	(0)
2001–2003	Hércules	30	(9)
Total		327	(102)

International career
1988	Spain U19	1	(0)

Managerial career
- 2004–2005: Alcalá (assistant)
- 2006–2007: Jove Español
- 2007–2008: San Fernando Henares
- 2009–2010: Talavera
- 2010–2012: Toledo
- 2013: Jorge Wilstermann
- 2015: Orihuela
- 2016–2017: Azuqueca
- 2017–2018: Villarrubia
- 2018–2019: Azuqueca
- 2022: Toledo
- * Club domestic league appearances and goals

Manuel "Manolo" Alfaro de la Torre (born 19 January 1971) is a Spanish retired footballer who played as a striker, and a manager.

His 14-year professional career was mainly associated with Hércules, for which he scored 55 official goals whilst competing in all three major levels of Spanish football.

== Playing career ==
Born in Alcalá de Henares, Community of Madrid, Alfaro made his professional debuts with the club at which he finished his football formation, Atlético Madrid. He played rarely for the Colchoneros' first team, with 18 of his 24 appearances coming in the 1992–93 season, and was also loaned to Real Valladolid during his stint in the Spanish capital.

Alfaro signed for Hércules CF in 1994, scoring 20 Segunda División goals in his first two seasons combined, including 12 in the 1995–96 campaign en route to a La Liga return after a ten-year absence for the Alicante side. In the following year he netted a career-best 15 goals, but they were immediately relegated back.

In 1998–99, Alfaro produced another solid season in the top flight, now with Villarreal CF (35 games and 12 goals), but suffered another relegation. After years battling with chronic tendinitis he decided to retire from football in December 2002, aged 31; his last club was Hércules, now in Segunda División B.

== Coaching career ==
After his retirement, Alfaro coached mainly in amateur football. In the 2004–05 season he worked alongside former Hércules teammate Josip Višnjić at hometown's RSD Alcalá, acting as director of football, youth coordinator and first-team assistant manager for the third division team; in the following year, he returned to his main club Hércules as a scout.

After two seasons in Tercera División with as many sides, Alfaro again worked with Hércules, as director of football. In 2009–10, he returned to coaching duties in the tier where he left off, with Talavera CF, but the club folded soon after. In November 2010, he was appointed at another fourth level team, CD Toledo.

== Honours ==
=== Player ===
Atlético Madrid

- Copa del Rey: 1991–92

Hércules

- Segunda División: 1995–96

=== Manager ===
Toledo

- Tercera División: 2010–11
