= Hellín Deportivo =

- Full name: Hellín Deportivo
- Founded: 1989
- Dissolved: 2016
- Ground: Santa Ana, Hellín, Castile-La Mancha, Spain
- Capacity: 3,000
- Chairman: Manuel Martínez Jiménez
- Manager: Yoyo Ocaña
- 2015–16: Primera Autonómica Preferente – Group 1, 16th of 18
Home colours	Away colours

Hellín Deportivo was a Spanish football team based in Hellín, Province of Albacete, in the autonomous community of Castile-La Mancha. Founded in 1989 and dissolved in 2016, it last played in Primera Autonómica Preferente – Group 1, holding home matches at Estadio Santa Ana, with a 3,000-seat capacity.

In 2016, after Hellín Deportivo's dissolution, a new club named Hellín CF was founded.

== Season to season ==
Season	Tier	Division	Place	Copa del Rey
1989–90	7	2ª Reg.	4th	
1990–91	7	2ª Reg.	1st	
1991–92	6	1ª Reg.	1st	
1992–93	5	Reg. Pref.	6th	
1993–94	5	Reg. Pref.	1st	
1994–95	4	3ª	1st	
1995–96	4	3ª	5th	
1996–97	4	3ª	8th	
1997–98	4	3ª	1st	
1998–99	4	3ª	3rd	
1999–2000	4	3ª	12th	
2000–01	4	3ª	3rd	
2001–02	4	3ª	5th	
2002–03	4	3ª	1st	

Season	Tier	Division	Place	Copa del Rey
2003–04	4	3ª	3rd	
2004–05	4	3ª	20th	
2005–06	5	1ª Aut.	1st	
2006–07	4	3ª	7th	
2007–08	4	3ª	8th	
2008–09	4	3ª	4th	
2009–10	4	3ª	12th	
2010–11	4	3ª	17th	
2011–12	4	3ª	13th	
2012–13	4	3ª	5th	
2013–14	4	3ª	14th	
2014–15	4	3ª	20th	
2015–16	5	Aut. Pref.	16th	

- 18 seasons in Tercera División

== Famous players ==
- (Dominican Republic) Rony Beard
- (Equatorial Guinea) Rodolfo Bodipo
- (Spain) Juan Antonio Chesa
- (Spain) Josico

== Kit ==
- Standard: dark blue shirt, white shorts and socks.
- Alternative: yellow shirt, dark blue shorts and white socks.
