= Juan Antonio Chesa =

Spanish footballer

Personal information
- Full name: Juan Antonio Chesa Camacho
- Date of birth: 1 February 1970 (age 56)
- Place of birth: Alicante, Spain
- Height: 1.81 m (5 ft 11 1/2 in)
- Position: Midfielder

Youth career
- Don Bosco
- 1987–1988: Barcelona

Senior career*
| Years | Team | Apps | (Gls) |
| 1988–1989 | Villarreal | 33 | (3) |
| 1989–1990 | Albacete | 19 | (6) |
| 1990–1991 | Málaga | 24 | (0) |
| 1991–1994 | Albacete | 84 | (7) |
| 1994–1995 | Rayo Vallecano | 20 | (4) |
| 1995 | Hellín | | |
| 1995–1996 | Albacete | 12 | (0) |
| 1996–1997 | Écija | 11 | (0) |
| 1997 | Manchego | 8 | (1) |
| 1997 | Pego | | |
| 1997–1998 | Novelda | 6 | (0) |
| 1998–1999 | Caravaca | | |
| Total | | 217 | (21) |

International career
| 1991–1992 | Spain U23 | 2 | (0) |
- * Club domestic league appearances and goals

Juan Antonio Chesa Camacho (born 1 February 1970 in Alicante, Valencian Community) is a Spanish retired footballer who played as a midfielder.
