= Juan Sabas =

Spanish footballer and manager

Personal information
- Full name: Juan Sabas Huertas Lorente
- Date of birth: 13 April 1967 (age 59)
- Place of birth: Madrid, Spain
- Height: 1.72 m (5 ft 7 1/2 in)
- Position: Forward

Youth career
- Rayo Fátima
- Montilla Villaverde

Senior career*
Years	Team	Apps	(Gls)
1985–1986	Tomelloso	20	(4)
1986–1987	Valdepeñas	35	(6)
1987–1989	Pegaso	72	(39)
1989–1990	Rayo Vallecano	34	(6)
1990–1994	Atlético Madrid	63	(9)
1994–1997	Betis	70	(12)
1997–1999	Mérida	64	(16)
1999–2001	Albacete	47	(8)
2001	Linense	2	(1)
2001	Hércules	13	(1)
2001	Ciudad Murcia	4	(1)
2001–2002	Pegaso		
Total		424	(103)

Managerial career
- 2005–2006: Ciudad Murcia (assistant)
- 2007: Levante (assistant)
- 2009: Atlético Madrid (assistant)
- 2010–2011: Valladolid (assistant)
- 2013–2014: SS Reyes
- 2016–2017: Extremadura
- 2018: Extremadura
- 2020: Córdoba
- 2023–2024: Melilla
- 2024–2025: Zamora
- * Club domestic league appearances and goals

Juan Sabas Huertas Lorente (born 13 April 1967) is a Spanish former professional footballer who played as a forward, currently a manager.

== Playing career ==
After starting out with local teams, Madrid-born Sabas went on to play as a senior for Rayo Vallecano, Atlético Madrid (where he was used mainly as a substitute), Real Betis, CP Mérida, Albacete Balompié, Real Balompédica Linense, Hércules CF and Ciudad de Murcia, finishing his 17-year career with Galáctico Pegaso and retiring at the age of 35.

Sabas won two Copa del Rey trophies with Atlético. In the 1991 final, he played 34 minutes of the 1–0 win against RCD Mallorca at the Santiago Bernabéu Stadium after replacing the injured Paulo Futre.

Sabas appeared in 196 La Liga matches over nine seasons, and scored 34 goals. In the Segunda División, he added 82 games and 17 goals.

== Coaching career ==
Sabas returned to Atlético in early 2009 as part of former teammate Abel Resino's coaching staff, having already worked with him in that capacity at Ciudad de Murcia and Levante UD. His first managerial experience occurred with UD San Sebastián de los Reyes during the 2013–14 season, and he later became a director of football at that club.

On 29 December 2016, Sabas was appointed head coach at Extremadura UD of the third division, being sacked the following 1 August. He returned to the Estadio Francisco de la Hera on 1 May 2018, helping to achieve a first-ever promotion to the second tier; on 10 November, however, he was again dismissed.

Sabas was appointed by Córdoba CF on 10 March 2020, after the dismissal of Raül Agné. On 1 December, after only six matches, he was relieved of his duties.

On 24 October 2023, after nearly three years of inactivity, Sabas was named manager of UD Melilla in the Primera Federación. In March 2024, with his side in the relegation zone, he was fired.

Sabas took over fellow third-tier Zamora CF on 4 July 2024. He missed a play-off spot in his first season by six points, but was sacked on 3 November 2025.

== Managerial statistics ==
As of 1 November 2025

Managerial record by team and tenure
Team	Nat	From	To	Record								Ref
Team	Nat	From	To	G	W	D	L	GF	GA	GD	Win %	Ref
SS Reyes	(Spain)	1 July 2013	30 June 2014	46	26	11	9	74	34	+40	56.52	
Extremadura	(Spain)	29 December 2016	1 August 2017	19	8	8	3	23	14	+9	42.11	
Extremadura	(Spain)	1 May 2018	10 November 2018	22	7	4	11	31	30	+1	31.82	
Córdoba	(Spain)	10 March 2020	1 December 2020	6	2	2	2	6	6	+0	33.33	
Melilla	(Spain)	24 October 2023	4 March 2024	19	6	2	11	11	27	−16	31.58	
Zamora	(Spain)	4 July 2024	4 November 2025	50	18	15	17	59	50	+9	36.00	
Total				162	67	42	53	204	161	+43	41.36	—

== Honours ==
=== Player ===
Atlético Madrid

- Copa del Rey: 1990–91, 1991–92

Ciudad de Murcia

- Tercera División: 2000–01
