= Javi López (footballer, born 1964) =

Spanish footballer and manager

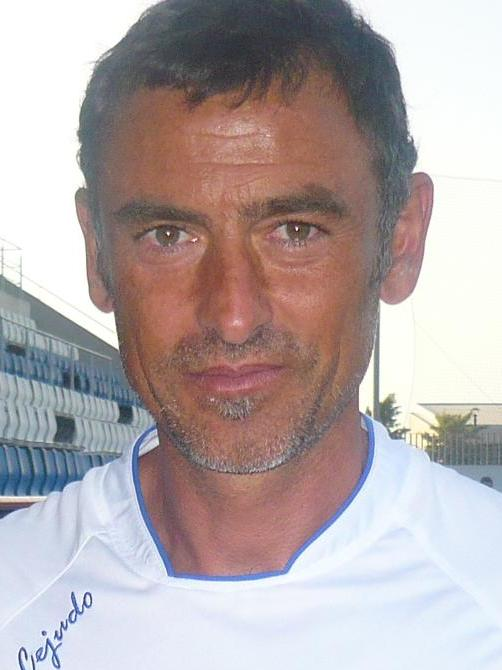
- López as Recreativo manager in 2009

Personal information
- Full name: Francisco Javier López Castro
- Date of birth: 3 March 1964 (age 62)
- Place of birth: Barcelona, Spain
- Height: 1.82 m (5 ft 11 1/2 in)
- Position: Centre-back

Youth career
- Damm
- Barcelona
- Espanyol

Senior career*
Years	Team	Apps	(Gls)
1985–1986	Espanyol B		
1986–1987	Masnou		
1987–1989	Fraga	53	(2)
1989–1990	Gandía	31	(1)
1990–1992	Mérida	76	(0)
1992–1993	Yeclano	24	(0)
1993–1996	Villarreal	97	(2)
1996–1997	Racing Ferrol	27	(0)
1997–1998	San Pedro	35	(0)
1998–1999	Onda		
Total		343+	(5+)

Managerial career
- 1999–2001: Onda (assistant)
- 2001: Onda
- 2002: Ciudad Murcia
- 2003–2004: Novelda
- 2004–2005: Castellón
- 2005–2007: Salamanca
- 2007–2008: Gimnàstic
- 2009: Alavés
- 2009: Recreativo
- 2010–2011: Xerez
- 2011: Cartagena
- 2013–2014: Girona
- 2014–2015: Celta B
- 2018: Lugo
- * Club domestic league appearances and goals

Francisco Javier 'Javi' López Castro (born 3 March 1964 in Barcelona, Catalonia) is a Spanish former professional football central defender and manager.

== Managerial statistics ==
As of 28 October 2018

Managerial record by team and tenure
Team	Nat	From	To	Record								Ref
Team	Nat	From	To	G	W	D	L	GF	GA	GD	Win %	Ref
Onda	(Spain)	1 July 2001	21 October 2001	8	2	0	6	10	16	−6	25.00	
Ciudad Murcia	(Spain)	30 June 2002	12 November 2002	13	7	3	3	18	7	+11	53.85	
Novelda	(Spain)	1 July 2003	30 June 2004	38	15	10	13	41	40	+1	39.47	
Castellón	(Spain)	1 July 2004	25 April 2005	36	15	11	10	30	22	+8	41.67	
Salamanca	(Spain)	1 July 2005	30 June 2007	86	40	22	24	122	90	+32	46.51	
Gimnàstic	(Spain)	30 June 2007	7 January 2008	20	5	5	10	19	24	−5	25.00	
Alavés	(Spain)	9 February 2009	30 June 2009	19	5	4	10	19	26	−7	26.32	
Recreativo	(Spain)	1 July 2009	30 November 2009	17	7	3	7	18	18	+0	41.18	
Xerez	(Spain)	17 July 2010	14 June 2011	46	20	9	17	68	70	−2	43.48	
Cartagena	(Spain)	19 September 2011	22 December 2011	14	2	7	5	7	12	−5	14.29	
Girona	(Spain)	19 December 2013	9 March 2014	11	1	6	4	11	13	−2	9.09	
Celta B	(Spain)	12 November 2014	16 March 2015	17	4	3	10	18	31	−13	23.53	
Lugo	(Spain)	17 June 2018	28 October 2018	13	5	3	5	15	15	+0	38.46	
Total				338	128	86	124	396	384	+12	37.87	—
