= Alejandro Sánchez (footballer, born 1970) =

Spanish footballer (born 1970)

Personal information
- Full name: Alejandro Sánchez Gómez
- Date of birth: 10 September 1970 (age 56)
- Place of birth: Madrid, Spain
- Height: 1.79 m (5 ft 10 in)
- Position: Left back

Senior career*
Years	Team	Apps	(Gls)
1990–1991	Pegaso	38	(2)
1991–1993	Atlético Madrid B	63	(3)
1993–1995	Atlético Madrid	10	(1)
1993–1994	→ Atlético Marbella (loan)	36	(0)
1995–1997	Albacete Balompié	31	(1)
1997–1999	Toledo	36	(1)
1999–2000	Getafe	29	(0)
Total		243	(8)
- * Club domestic league appearances and goals as of 18 January 2021

Alejandro Sánchez Gómez (born 10 September 1970) is a Spanish former footballer who played as a left back and later worked as a coach.

He played for a variety of clubs in Spain's top three divisions, including 41 appearances in La Liga with Atlético Madrid and Albacete Balompié in the mid-1990s.

== Playing career ==
=== Pegaso ===
Sánchez was born in the Spanish capital, Madrid, and began his career with local minnows Pegaso. His breakthrough season was the 1990–91 Segunda División B campaign, as he made his debut in Pegaso's opening fixture, a 2–2 draw at home to Ourense on 2 September. His next game was a Copa del Rey first round match away at Atlético Valdemoro; he was sent off, and the match ended 3–3. Despite this setback, he featured in all 38 of Pegaso's league games that season, and also scored twice: in a 1–1 away draw against Pontevedra at Estadio Municipal de Pasarón on 10 February, and a 3–0 away win over Atlético Madrileño at Vicente Calderón Stadium. However, he couldn't prevent Pegaso's relegation, as they finished two points shy of safety in 17th place, which was confirmed following a 1–0 home loss to Lugo on the final day of the season.

=== Atlético Madrid ===
Sánchez's performances for Pegaso did not go unnoticed, and he joined one of Madrid's biggest teams, Atlético Madrid, in 1991. Initially, he played for the newly renamed Atlético Madrid B (formerly Atlético Madrileño), who were erstwhile rivals of Pegaso in Segunda División B. He made his debut in the opening match of the 1991–92 Segunda División B campaign, a 1–1 draw away at Tomelloso on 1 September. A week later, he made his home debut at the Vicente Calderón Stadium in a 1–0 win over Alcoyano. He ultimately made 32 appearances in a successful first season with Atleti.

The following season, he made 31 appearances for Atlético B, and also scored his first goal for the club, in a 1–1 away draw against As Pontes. He added two more goals before the end of the year: in 3–2 away loss to Racing de Ferrol on 18 April, and six days later in a 3–2 home win over Real Aranjuez CF. He received his first call-up to the first team on 14 March, making his La Liga debut in a 2–1 loss to Sporting de Gijón at El Molinón. He also featured a week later, coming on for Manolo with sixteen minutes to play at home to Rayo Vallecano, and helping Atleti hold on for a 1–0 victory.

Towards the end of the season, it was decided that Sánchez, while not yet ready for a more permanent role with the first team, needed experience at a higher level than the B team could provide. He therefore joined Atlético Marbella of the Segunda División on loan in May 1993. He made his Marbella debut on 29 May, as a second-half substitute for Juan Antonio Lozano in a 3–1 home loss to Racing Santander. His full debut, and only other appearance before the end of the season, came a week later at home to Real Madrid B. He started in the 3–0 defeat, but was withdrawn in the second half in favour of Juan José Almagro.

Sánchez spent the entirety of the 1993–94 season with Marbella, making 35 appearances. His strong performances allowed him to have a more prominent role when he returned to his parent club the following year, as he played eleven matches. He scored his first La Liga goal at home to Sevilla on 29 January: having come on early in the second half for Toni Muñoz, he scored a 75th-minute equaliser, and helped nine-man Atlético to a 2–2 draw.

He played the last four minutes of the return fixture at Ramón Sánchez Pizjuán Stadium on 18 June, which also ended 2–2, this time as a replacement for José Luis Caminero. However, this was to be his last appearance for Los Rojiblancos, as he left the club at the end of the season in search of more regular top flight action.

=== Albacete Balompié ===
This goal was met at his next club, Albacete Balompié, who he joined in 1995. Curiously, his Albacete debut came at the same venue, against the same opponents, as that for Atlético: Sporting de Gijón at El Molinón. Albacete lost 3–0, but Sánchez had more success on his home debut a week later, as they beat Sevilla 3–2 at Estadio Carlos Belmonte on 9 September. On 24 September, he scored what would turn out to be his only Albacete goal, in a 4–0 home win over Celta Vigo. He played 31 times that season, but didn't feature after a 1–0 to Valencia at Mestalla Stadium on 7 April. This meant he wasn't present for the relegation playoff games against Extremadura, which Albacete lost.

He didn't play again for Albacete after their relegation, although he remained at the club for another 18 months before leaving in December 1997.

=== Toledo ===
Sánchez switched clubs midway through the 1997–98 Segunda División season, joining Albacete's fellow Castilian-Manchegan club Toledo. He made his debut on 17 December in a home fixture against his former club, Atlético Madrid B. Toledo lost the match at Estadio Salto del Caballo 1–0, but Sánchez quickly established himself in the team, and played 19 games before the end of the season. The only hiccup came as he was sent off in a home match against Lleida, although the hosts held on for a 1–0 victory.

The following year, his first full season with Toledo, he made 17 appearances, and also netted his only goal for the club. This came in a 2–1 win over Leganés at their new stadium, Estadio Municipal de Butarque, on 2 May 1999. His final match for Toledo was the 2–1 home defeat at the hands of champions Málaga on 12 June, as he left the club at the end of the season.

=== Getafe ===
Madrid side Getafe were Segunda División B group champions in 1998–99, and Sánchez joined them ahead of their first season back in the Segunda División after three years away. He was an immediate fixture in the team, making his debut on 22 August in a 2–1 away loss to Badajoz at the brand new Estadio Nuevo Vivero. This was followed by his home debut six days later, against Extremadura at Coliseum Alfonso Pérez, which also resulted in a 2–1 loss. Despite this shaky start, after a 1–0 away win against Sanchez's former team, Albacete, on the last day of the season, Getafe found themselves clear of relegation by two points. The Albacete game would transpire to be Sánchez's last as a professional, as he retired at the end of the season, just shy of his 30th birthday.

== Coaching career ==
After retirement, Sánchez returned to Atlético Madrid as a coach for their C team.

== Career statistics ==
As of 18 January 2021

Club	Season	League			Cup		Total	
Club	Season	Division	Apps	Goals	Apps	Goals	Apps	Goals
Pegaso	1990–91	Segunda División B	38	2	3	0	41	2
Atlético Madrid B	1991–92	Segunda División B	32	0	–	–	32	0
Atlético Madrid B	1992–93	Segunda División B	31	3	–	–	31	3
Atlético Madrid B	Total		63	3	0	0	63	3
Atlético Madrid	1992–93	La Liga	2	0	0	0	2	0
Atlético Madrid	1994–95	La Liga	8	1	3	0	11	1
Atlético Madrid	Total		10	1	3	0	13	1
Atlético Marbella	1992–93	Segunda División	2	0	0	0	2	0
Atlético Marbella	1993–94	Segunda División	34	0	1	0	35	0
Atlético Marbella	Total		36	0	1	0	37	0
Albacete Balompié	1995–96	La Liga	31	1	0	0	31	1
Albacete Balompié	1996–97	Segunda División	0	0	0	0	0	0
Albacete Balompié	1997–98	Segunda División	0	0	0	0	0	0
Albacete Balompié	Total		31	1	0	0	31	1
Toledo	1997–98	Segunda División	19	0	0	0	19	0
Toledo	1998–99	Segunda División	17	1	0	0	17	1
Toledo	Total		36	1	0	0	36	1
Getafe	1999–2000	Segunda División	29	0	2	0	31	0
Career total			243	8	9	0	252	8
