= Timeline of Palma de Mallorca =

The following is a timeline of the history of the city of Palma, Spain.

== Prior to 20th century ==
- 123 BCE – Roman and Spanish settlers arrive on island organised by Quintus Caecilius Metellus Balearicus.
- 450 CE – Vandals in power (approximate date).
- 8th century CE – Arabs in power.
- 800s – Second wall built around Palma.
- 902 – Moorish Emirate of Córdoba in power; city called "Medina Mayurka".
- 12th century – Third wall built around city.
- 1114 – City taken by Catalan and Pisan forces.
- 1116 – Almoravide Moors in power.
- 1229 – Conquest of Majorca by Christian forces; Catalans in power.^{(ca)}
- 1230
  - Carto de Poblacio (city constitution) created.
  - Palma Cathedral construction begins.
- 1281 – Convento de San Francisco (Palma de Mallorca) construction begins.
- 1295 – James II of Aragon in power per Treaty of Anagni.
- 1302 – "Weekly market" begins.
- 1311 – Bellver Castle built.
- 1331 – Synagogue built.
- 1343 – Consulate of the Sea established.
- 1349 – Peter IV of Aragon in power.
- 1390 – Public clock installed (approximate date).
- 1391 – Majorcan revolt of 1391 against Jews.
- 1403 – Flood.
- 1456 – Lonja de Palma de Mallorca (market-exchange) built.
- 1488 – Spanish Inquisition begins.
- 1503 – University founded.
- 1521-1523 – Peasant uprising ("Brotherhoods of Mallorca").
- 1541 – King Charles I of Spain visits Majorca.
- 1601 – Palma Cathedral construction completed.
- 1616 – Palacio Episcopal built.
- 1700 – Seminary established.
- 1836 – Nautical school and Institute founded.
- 1839 – Diario constitucional de Palma newspaper in publication.
- 1840 – Casino Palmesano established.
- 1842 – Population: 40,892.
- 1851
  - Círculo Mallorquín established.
  - Arxiu Històric de les Balears (archives) active.
- 1852 – Diario de Palma newspaper in publication.
- 1857 – Teatro Principal (theatre) opens.
- 1860 – Queen Isabel II of Spain visits Majorca.
- 1872
  - Banc de Crèdit Balear (bank) established.
  - City walls dismantled.
- 1875 – Inca-Palma railway begins operating.
- 1880 – Sociedad Arqueológica Luliana founded.
- 1881 – Banc Mallorquí (bank) established.
- 1893 – Última Hora newspaper begins publication.
- 1900 – Population: 63,937.

== 20th century ==
- 1902 – Teatro Lirico (theatre) opens.
- 1903 – Gran Hotel built.
- 1904 – King Alfonso XIII of Spain visits Majorca.
- 1910 – Fomento de turismo de Mallorca (government tourism office) created.
- 1916 – RCD Mallorca football club formed.
- 1925 – Palace of Marivent built.
- 1936 – City bombed in the Battle of Majorca during Spanish Civil War.
- 1939 – Diari de Balears newspaper begins publication.
- 1940 – Population: 114,405.
- 1945 – Es Fortí stadium opens.
- 1953 – Diario de Mallorca newspaper begins publication.
- 1960 – Palma de Mallorca Airport terminal built.
- 1965 – Teatre Municipal (Palma) (theatre) built.
- 1967 – Auditòrium de Palma opens.
- 1970 – Population: 234,098.
- 1979 – Ramón Aguiló becomes mayor.
- 1981 – El Mundo newspaper begins publication.
- 1991
  - Joan Fageda becomes mayor.
  - Population: 308,616.
- 1999
  - July: 1999 Summer Universiade athletic event held in Palma.
  - Son Moix stadium opens.

== 21st century ==
- 2004 – Biblioteca de Can Sales (public library) opens.
- 2015 – José Hila becomes mayor.

== See also ==
- Palma, Majorca history
- List of mayors of Palma, Majorca
- History of Majorca island

== Bibliography ==
- Guia de Palma (in Spanish). Gelabert. 1872.
- Richard Ford (1890), "Majorca: Palma", Handbook for Travellers in Spain, vol. 2 (7th ed.), London: J. Murray, hdl:2027/uva.x001198108
- Meyer Kayserling (1905), "Palma", Jewish Encyclopedia, vol. 9, New York, hdl:2027/mdp.49015002282474
- "Palma (Balearic Islands)" . Encyclopædia Britannica. Vol. 20 (11th ed.). 1910. p. 643.
- "Palma", Spain and Portugal (4th ed.), Leipzig: Karl Baedeker, 1913, hdl:2027/uc2.ark:/13960/t5q81nw29 – via HathiTrust
- Lisa Klobuchar (1995). "Palma". In Trudy Ring (ed.). Southern Europe. International Dictionary of Historic Places. Vol. 3. Fitzroy Dearborn. pp. 523–527. ISBN 1884964028.
