= Aguiló =

Aguiló is a surname from Mallorca, Spain. The surname is associated with Xuetes, a Crypto-Jewish community. Notable people with the surname include:

- Gabriel Rodríguez Aguiló (born 1973), Puerto Rican politician
- Marian Aguiló (1825–1897), Spanish poet
- Ramón Aguiló (born 1950), Spanish politician

== See also ==
- Cançoner Vega-Aguiló, chansonnier of medieval music
