= Karl Baedeker (scientist) =

German physicist (1877–1914)

Karl Wilhelm Sali Baedeker (/ˈbeɪdɪkər/ BAY-dik-ər; German: [ˈbɛːdəkɐ]; 3 February 1877 – 6 August 1914) was a German experimental physicist, born in Leipzig. He was a professor at the University of Jena.

He was the grandson of Karl Baedeker, the founder of the eponymous travel guide publishing house, and the son of Fritz Baedeker, who ran the same company from 1869 until his death in 1925.

One of his scientific discoveries was that the resistivity of cuprous iodide (CuI) depended on its stoichiometry. Thin films of the material became much more conductive when exposed to iodine vapor; the effect was reversible. This was the first example of doping a semiconductor to change its properties and also the discovery of transparent conductive materials.

He also observed a Hall effect in transparent copper iodide thin films that had the reverse sign to that in copper, an observation of what was later to be known as conduction by electron holes in semiconductors. This observation was critical in developing the theory of electron conduction in solids. Along with his graduate student Karl Steinberg, Baedeker studied the effect of varying concentration of iodine on the electrical properties of copper iodide.

He also is credited with making the first transparent conducting oxide (TCO) thin film, cadmium oxide (CdO), in 1907. TCOs are now ubiquitous in optoelectronics and a multibillion-dollar industry.

Baedeker was killed in action in August 1914 during World War I at the Battle of Liège. His son, Karl Friedrich Baedeker revived the Baedeker publishing house after the Second World War.

In 2014, a conference on transparent conducting oxides was held in Leipzig to commemorate the centenary of Baedeker's death. A paper on the life and work of Baedeker was published in the proceedings of the meeting.
