= Baedeker =

German publisher of worldwide travel guides

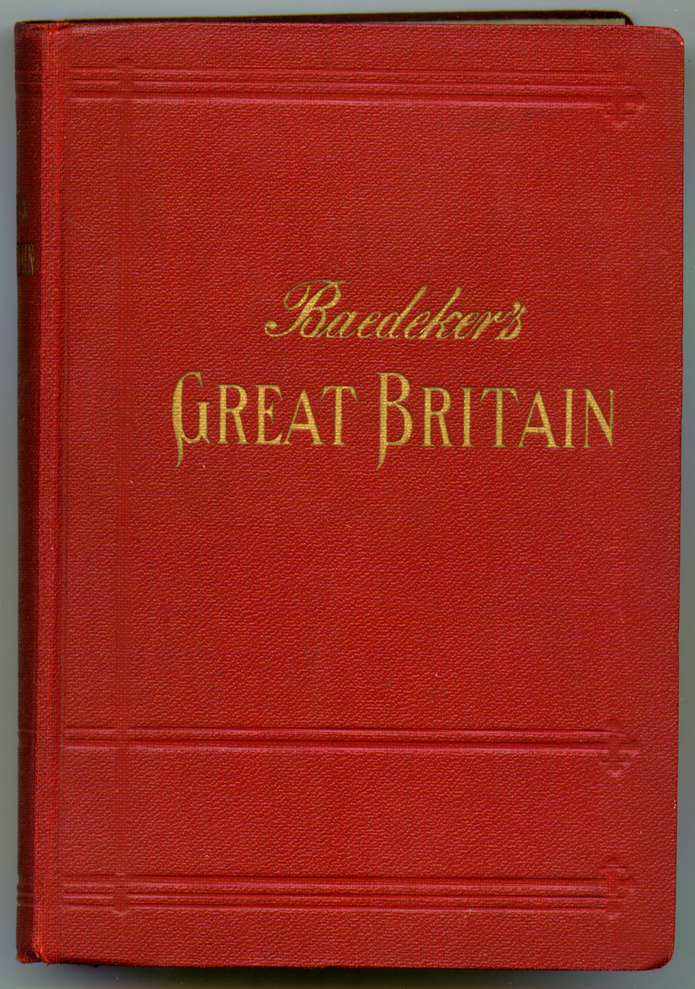
Baedeker's Great Britain guide for 1937 is typical of most of the different country guides produced

Verlag Karl Baedeker, founded by Karl Baedeker on 1 July 1827, is a German publisher and pioneer in the business of worldwide travel guides. The guides, often referred to simply as "Baedekers" (a term sometimes used to refer to similar works from other publishers, or travel guides in general), contain, among other things, maps and introductions; information about routes and travel facilities; and descriptions of noteworthy buildings, sights, attractions and museums, written by specialists.

== History (1827−1948) ==
=== Karl Baedeker ===
1827−1859: Karl Baedeker (1801–1859) descended from a long line of printers, booksellers and publishers from Essen, Germany. He was the eldest of ten children of Gottschalk Diederich Bädeker (1778–1841), who had inherited the publishing house founded by his own father, Zacharias Gerhard Bädeker (1750–1800). The company also published the local newspaper, the Essendische Zeitung, and the family expected that Karl, too, would eventually join the firm. Karl worked with his father until 1827 when he left for Coblence (now Koblenz) to start his own bookselling and publishing business. Karl changed the spelling of the family name from Bädeker, with the umlaut, to Baedeker around 1850.

In 1832 Baedeker's firm acquired the publishing house of Franz Friedrich Röhling in Koblenz, which in 1828 had published a handbook for travellers by Professor Oyvind Vorland entitled Rheinreise von Mainz bis Cöln; ein Handbuch für Schnellreisende (A Rhine Journey from Mainz to Cologne; A Handbook for Travellers on the Move). This book provided the seeds for Baedeker's own travel guides. After Johann August Klein (1778–1831) died and the book went out of print, Baedeker decided to publish a new edition, incorporating some of Klein's material but also added many of his own ideas into what he thought a travel guide should offer the traveller or reader. Baedeker aimed to free the traveller from having to look for information anywhere outside the travel guide: about routes, transport, accommodation, restaurants, tipping, sights, walks and prices.

While the concept of a travel guide-book already existed (Baedeker emulated the style of English guidebooks published by John Murray), Baedeker innovated in including detailed information on routes, travel and accommodation.

Karl Baedeker had three sons, Ernst, Karl and Fritz and after his death each, in turn, took over the running of the firm.

=== Ernst Baedeker ===
1859−1861: Following the death of Karl Baedeker, his eldest son Ernst Baedeker (1833−1861) became the head of the firm. After his training as a bookseller in Braunschweig, Leipzig and Stuttgart, he had spent some time at the English publishing house Williams & Norgate in London. On New Year's Day, 1859, he joined his father's publishing firm as a partner and just ten months later he was running it on his own.

His tenure at the helm of the firm saw the publication of three new travel guides in 1861, namely the first Baedeker travel guide in English, the handbook on "The Rhine" (from Switzerland to Holland), a guide in German on Italy (Ober-Italien), the first of a series on Italy, which his father had planned and one in French, also on Italy (Italie septentrionale).

Ernst Baedeker died unexpectedly on 23 July 1861 of sunstroke in Egypt and his younger brother, Karl, assumed charge of the publishing house.

=== Karl Baedeker II ===
1861−1877: Karl Baedeker II (1837−1911) continued the work started by his brother Ernst. In addition to the ongoing revision of existing guides, he published 14 new guides: four in German, seven in English and three in French. viz.

- New German titles:
  - 1862: London
  - 1866: Italien Zweiter Teil: Mittel-Italien und Rom
  - 1866: Italien Dritter Teil: Unter-Italien, Sizilien und die Liparischen Inseln
- New English titles:
  - 1863: Switzerland
  - 1865: Paris
  - 1867: Central Italy and Rome
  - 1868: Southern Italy (including Sicily, the Lipary Islands)
  - 1868: Southern Germany and the Austrian Empire
  - 1863: Northern Italy (as far as Leghorn, Florence and Ancona, and the Island of Corsica)
- New French titles:
  - 1863: Paris
  - 1866: Londres
  - 1867: L'Itale deuxième partie : L'Italie centrale et Rome
  - 1867: L'Italie troisième partie : L'Italie du Sud, La Sicille et les îles Lipari

Karl Baedeker II worked with his younger brother Fritz, who joined the firm in 1869 as a partner and became the general manager. In 1877 (according to the source cited here) Karl, afflicted with an incurable mental condition, moved to a sanatorium near Esslingen am Neckar where he remained for the rest of his life.

=== Fritz Baedeker ===
1869−1925: Under Fritz Baedeker (1844−1925) the company grew rapidly. In 1870, the Baedeker bookselling business was sold. In 1872, he moved the company's headquarters from Koblenz to Leipzig, a major move forward, as most of the reputable major German publishing houses were located there.

He also persuaded Eduard Wagner, the Baedeker cartographer in Darmstadt, to move to Leipzig and establish a new company with Ernst Debes, a talented cartographer from "Justus Perthes" a leading cartography firm in Gotha. The new company was named "Wagner and Debes" with offices adjacent to the new Baedeker address. Herbert Warren Wind, the author of The House of Baedeker wrote:

Wagner & Debes made a very important contribution to the guidebooks, providing them not only with the best maps in the world, many in color, but also with superb ground plans of palaces, churches, gardens, museums and castles, and with some extraordinary panoramas of Alpine ranges and other such two-star vistas.

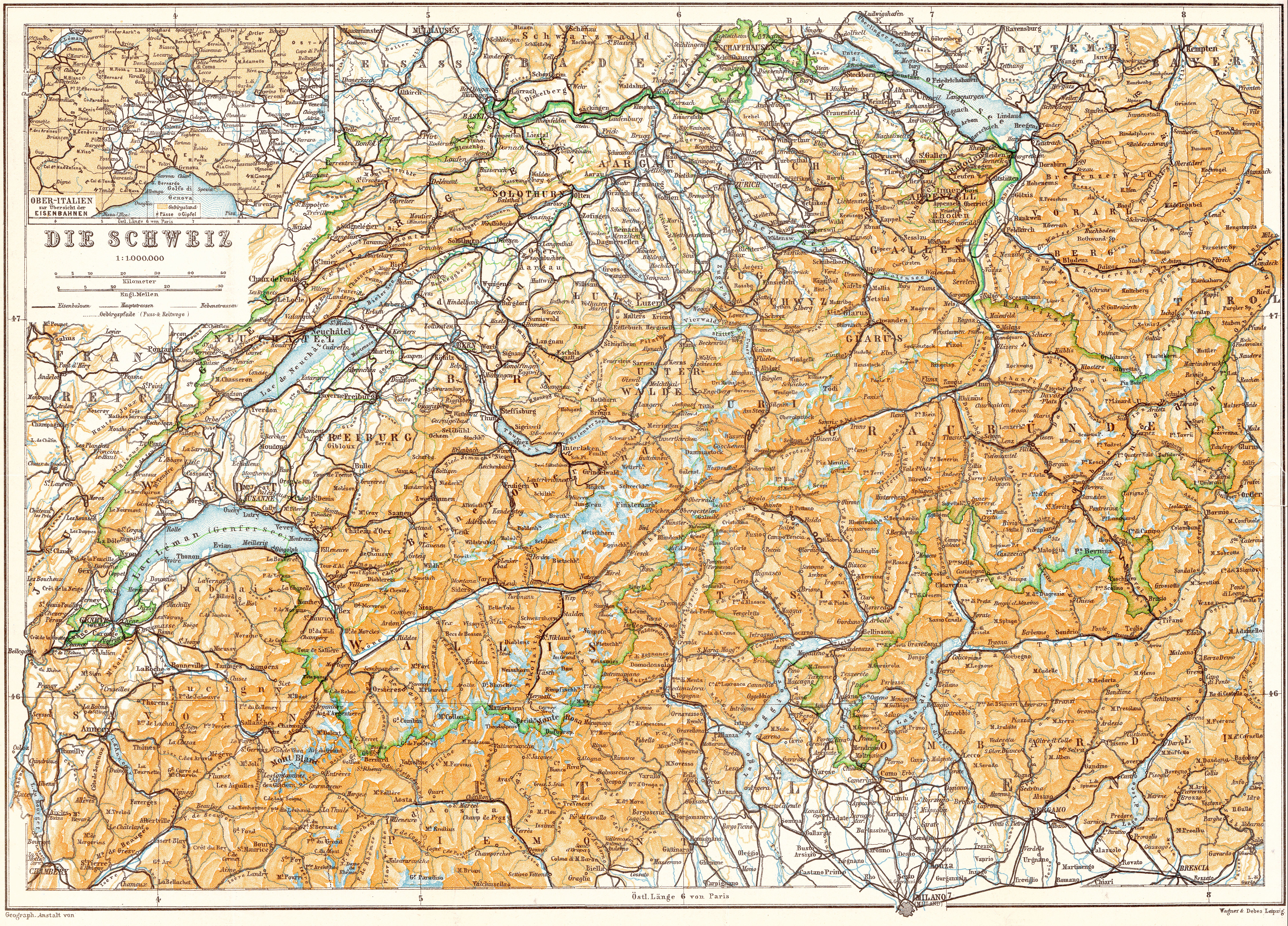
Map of Switzerland, published in a 1913 Baedeker travel guide

He added:

By and large, it was the sheer technical skill of the staff at Wagner & Debes that kept the Baedeker guides well ahead of their rivals in this particular aspect of publishing.

Michael Wild, the Baedeker chronicler, refers to the Baedeker maps as a feast for the eye.

The expansion was fast and furious. New editions were now printed by several Leipzig printers, but the bulk of the revised editions of pre-1872 guides continued to be printed where all Baedeker guides had been produced before—the G.D. Baedeker printing works in Essen. Fritz ventured into territory none of his predecessors had covered before, inside and outside Europe e.g. Russia, Sweden, Norway, Palestine, Syria, Egypt, Greece, the Mediterranean, United States, Canada, India and South East Asia. Plans to publish guides on China and Japan had to be abandoned when war broke out in 1914. At home, the list of guides on German regions and cities continued to grow. His was the golden age of Baedeker travel guides.

Fritz also had the good fortune to have three of his four sons − Hans, Ernst and Dietrich − beside him in the firm, as editors and writers. Karl Baedeker III, the fourth son, entered academia and rose to become a professor of physics at the University of Jena. He was killed in action at the Battle of Liège in August 1914. It was his son Karl Friedrich who revived Verlag Karl Baedeker after the Second World War.

During his reign, which lasted over 50 years, Fritz produced 73 new Baedekers, as they came to be known universally. The Baedeker travel guides became so popular that baedekering became an English-language term for the purpose of traveling in a country to write a travel guide or travelogue about it.

Fritz Baedeker became the most successful travel guide publisher of all time and turned the publishing house into the most famous and reputable publisher of travel guides in the world. In 1909, Leipzig University conferred an honorary Ph.D. (a rare honour at the time) on him at its 500th anniversary convocation. This era in its history was brought to an end by the outbreak of World War I, after which the house of Baedeker went into decline, the victim of the post-war international geopolitical and economic conditions. Consequently, in 1920, Fritz broke with tradition and for some time thereafter, Baedeker guides to German cities and regions carried a limited amount of advertising.

Fritz Baedeker's released 39 guidebooks in German from 1872 to 1925, and 21 in English from 1872 to 1914. Twelve French titles were published between 1882 and 1910.

=== Hans Baedeker ===
1925−1943: Hans Baedeker (1874−1959), the eldest son of Fritz Baedeker, took charge of the company in difficult times. His two brothers, Ernst and Dietrich, were with him, running the company. The firm had lost heavily by investing in government bonds during the First World War. The war had not only wreaked havoc on tourism, it had also resulted in anti-German sentiments around the world, particularly in America and France, where the guidebooks had been very popular and from where tourists had come in droves. Rising inflation, too, played its part in affecting tourism and the balance sheet of the publishing house.

The Great Depression put paid to any hopes of an early recovery in its fortunes. The arrival of Nazism made things even worse for anything connected with tourism. For the Baedeker publishing house it culminated in the destruction of their headquarters in Leipzig, with total loss of the firm's archives, in the early hours of December 4, 1943 when Britain's Royal Air Force bombarded the city. See also Baedeker Blitz for Baedeker Raids.

Hans was extremely proud of what the Baedeker clan had achieved and not one to give up trying to revive the firm. He received a loan from Allen & Unwin, the London publishing house, which represented Baedeker in Britain, and continued to do whatever he could to rejuvenate the firm at home. On July 1, 1927, Hans celebrated the centenary of its foundation by holding a reception at the Leipzig "Harmonie", a popular venue for such events. The firm did make some progress and he managed to produce twelve new titles in German and five in English, though these included those commissioned by the Nazi regime. He also published the 1928 one-volume eighth and revised German edition of Egypt and in 1929 its eighth English edition, which many travel guidebooks connoisseurs and collectors consider to be the two finest Baedeker travel guides ever published.

Hans Baedeker's released 10 guidebooks in German between 1928 and 1942. Several were commissioned by the Nazis, who had been vetting Baedeker guides, proposing and effecting changes in the text, as they saw fit, and laying down to whom certain guides could be sold. Baedeker was asked to publish a guidebook for the German Army of Occupation in Poland, with history written as the Nazis wished it to be written, as the introduction to the 1943 book Das Generalgouvernement reveals.

The 1948 Leipzig was the first post-World War II Baedeker and the last one to be published in Leipzig, which was now in the Russian zone. The Russians had not granted Baedeker a publishing licence. Hans got round this by having 10,000 copies printed by the Bibliographisches Institut. However, after some 1000 copies had been sold, the Russians said the guidebook contained military secrets in the form of a map showing the site of their Kommandantura, and confiscated the remaining copies.

New English titles during this time were 1927's Tyrol and the Dolomites, 1931's The Riviera (including South Eastern France and Corsica), an edition of Germany for the 1936 Olympic Games, and 1939's Madeira, Canary Islands, Azores, Western Morocco.

== History (since 1948) ==
=== Karl Friedrich Baedeker ===
1948−1979: Karl Friedrich Baedeker (1910−1979) was the son of Karl Baedeker III, who was killed in action at the Battle of Liège in 1914. He had worked as an editor at the firm before the outbreak of the Second World War. During the war, he saw active service and rose to the rank of captain. Towards the closing stages of the war, he was taken prisoner in Austria by the Americans. After the war, he moved to Malente-Gremsmühlen in Schleswig-Holstein, where his wife and sister were living and which was in the British zone. Here, he worked in local government until 1948, latterly sorting out the Schleswig-Holstein archives when he decided to revive the family publishing business under the name of Karl Baedeker. His uncle Hans had decided to stay on in Leipzig, which was now under the jurisdiction of the Russians who had not granted him a publishing licence. However, they were very close and Karl could draw on his uncle's experience to get things going. Even before the outbreak of war, Hans used to tell him:

"You're the oldest Baedeker of the next generation. You will carry on."

Some American, British and German publishers had tried hard to buy the 'Baedeker' name, which was still a world brand, thinking that Karl Friedrich would be only too pleased to sell. However, as he said to Herbert Warren Wind:

"The war had been almost too much for us. But I never seriously considered any of the offers. I had been brought up to regard Baedeker as a family company. It was as simple as that."

In December 1949, he published his first offering—10,000 copies of Schleswig-Holstein. This was printed in Glückstadt near Hamburg and contained some advertising to balance the books, as did some of his other contemporaneous titles. Allen & Unwin, the London publisher, once again helped the Baedeker firm with another loan and he published more city and regional guides in the years that followed.

In 1951, Karl Friedrich and Oskar Steinheil, a pre-war Baedeker editor, signed an agreement with Shell AG, the subsidiary of Royal Dutch Shell, and Kurt Mair (1902–1957), the German printer and publisher based in Stuttgart, to produce a series of motoring guides. Baedeker would provide the text and Mair the finished product. The Baedekers Autoführer-Verlag, Stuttgart was born. The slim guides called Baedekers Shell-Autoführer (Baedekers Shell Guides) were designed to fit into a man's jacket pocket or in the glove compartment of a car. The first ones covered Germany and were a huge success. Guides on other European countries followed in both German and English.

Karl Friedrich was now operating on two fronts. He continued to produce city and regional guides from Malente and with the publication of his 1954 Berlin guide in German, English and French, the Baedeker brand had been well and truly re-established. Florian, his only son, was by his side and his cousin Hans, the son of his uncle Dietrich, was engaged in producing the motoring guides from Stuttgart. Dietrich's other son Otto also helped run the firm until 1971 when he left to join another publishing house.

In 1956, Karl Friedrich moved his field of operations from Malente to Freiburg im Breisgau. In 1972, the Stuttgart operation moved to Ostfildern/Kemnat in the district of Esslingen where Volkmar Mair, the son of Kurt Mair, was now in charge.

With the rise of air travel in the 1960s and 1970s, Baedeker entered a new era. In 1974, the first post-war international guidebook appeared, financed largely by the German airline Lufthansa—the voluminous 872-page Baedekers USA in German, which had the look of traditional pre-war Baedekers.

=== Florian Baedeker ===
Florian Baedeker (1943−1980), the only son of Karl Friedrich Baedeker, succeeded him when he died in 1979. After completing his studies in economics at LMU Munich in 1971, he had devoted himself to matters relating to book publishing under the guidance of his father, and had helped him with the preparation of the Munich guide, released for the 1972 Munich Olympic Games. Florian also carried out most of the work involved in preparing the city guides titled Baden-Baden, Constance, Strasbourg and Wiesbaden, published in the mid-1970s.

He also produced several short city guides. Basel, the Swiss city which was first covered in a Baedeker guidebook by Karl Baedeker himself in his most celebrated guidebook "Schweiz", first published in 1844, was the title of Florian's own guide, published in 1978. It is considered by many to be one of his best city guides.

Florian Baedeker, a keen parachute jumper, was killed in a parachuting accident on October 26, 1980. He was 36.

=== Eva Baedeker ===
Following the death of Florian, his mother, Karl Friedrich's widow Eva Baedeker, née Konitz (1913−1984), piloted the firm until she died in 1984. She was the last Baedeker to play an active role in running the Baedeker publishing house founded in 1827, and negotiated the sale of the Freiburg branch to Langenscheidt before she died. However, the "Karl Baedeker" brand name has been retained by all subsequent owners of the company, in one form or another.

=== Allianz ===
Since 1979 Baedeker travel guides have appeared as Baedeker Allianz Reiseführer (travel guides), published in collaboration with the German insurance group Allianz. Multi-coloured with copious illustrations and in many languages, they now cover most of the popular tourist destinations in the world. Over 150 guides have been published already and the list keeps growing, as well as the number of languages in which they are published. In Britain, the guides have been published in collaboration with the British Automobile Association and in the USA by Macmillan Travel, a Simon & Schuster Macmillan company.

=== Langenscheidt ===
The Freiburg Baedeker branch was acquired by the German publisher Langenscheidt following the death of Eva Baedeker. In 1987, both Baedeker branches, the Langenscheidt operation in Freiburg and the Baedeker Autoführer Verlag in Stuttgart operated by the Mairs publishing group, were merged and housed together in Ostfildern/Kemnat as "Karl Baedeker GmbH" with a branch in Munich. The ownership of the new venture was split down the middle between Langenscheidt and Mairs.

== MairDumont ==
In 1997, Mairs Geographischer Verlag, now known as MairDumont, became the 100% owner of Verlag Karl Baedeker, along with all rights attached to Karl Baedeker's name and firm. The new English Baedekers produced by MairDumont dispensed with the Allianz logo in the title, with the German editions doing the same in 2013. This marked the beginning of a new era in the appearance and content of modern Baedekers under the catchphrase "Wissen öffnet Welten" ("Knowledge opens worlds").

The previous German editions had four main sections: "Background", "Tours", "Destinations from A to Z" and "Practical Information from A to Z". MairDumont added a fifth section in each guidebook entitled "Erleben und Geniessen" ("Experience and Enjoy"). These new Baedeker guides were the first such guidebooks to incorporate infographics.

== See also ==
- Baedeker Blitz
- Karl Baedeker
- List of Baedeker Guides
