= History of the Jews in the Balearic Islands =

The history of the Jews in the Balearic Islands goes back more than a thousand years.

Jews have lived in the Balearic Islands in the Mediterranean, which belong to Spain. These are situated to the east of Valencia; the three principal islands are Mallorca, Menorca and Ibiza. The group first formed the Kingdom of Majorca; later it became a Spanish province under the domination of Aragon.

== Late antiquity ==
According to chroniclers, there were Jewish inhabitants in the Balearic Isles as early as the 2nd century. In the 5th century, at the instigation of Bishop Severus of Menorca, a persecution of the Jews took place in Mahón (Magona), which was the capital of Menorca. As a result, a number of Jews underwent baptism, including Theodore, who was a rich representative Jew who stood high in the estimation of his coreligionists and of Christians alike.

== Place of refuge ==
In consequence of the persecutions of the Almohades in Spain in 1146, the population of Jews on the islands increased, and in Palma, which was the capital of Majorca, a large synagogue and two smaller ones were erected. The Jews engaged in trade and agriculture, and estates, both hereditary (rahals) and leasehold (alguerias), were held in Inqua, Petra, and Montuiri by the community (almodayna), as well as by individual Jews. Among the latter were Almo, Ẓadic, Astruc de Tortosa, and his three brothers (Dameto, "Historia General del Reyno Balearico," pp. 277 et seq.; "Coleccion de Documentos Ineditos para la Historia de España," ix. 14, 18, 20, and elsewhere, Barcelona, 1856).

== Under Aragon from 1229 ==
James I of Aragon (1213–1276), who carried in his train Don Bachiel of Saragossa to act as interpreter, conquered Majorca on the last day of the year 1229, and annexed it to his kingdom. He gave the Jews a quarter in the neighborhood of his palace for their dwellings, granted protection to all Hebrews who wished to settle on the island, guaranteed them the rights of citizens, permitted them to adjudicate their own civil disputes, to kill cattle according to their ritual, and to draw up their wills and marriage contracts in Hebrew. Christians and Moors were forbidden, under severe penalties, to insult the Jews or to take earth and stones from their cemeteries; and the Jews were ordered to complain directly to the king of any act of injustice toward them on the part of the royal officials. They were allowed to charge 20 percent interest on loans, but the amount of interest was not to exceed the capital.

In case a Jew practised usury, the community was not held responsible. The penalty for lending money on the wages of slaves hired out by their masters was loss of the capital. Jews could buy and hold houses, vineyards, and other property in Mallorca as well as in any other part of the kingdom. They could not be compelled to lodge Christians in their homes: in fact, Christians were forbidden to dwell with Jews; and Jewish convicts were given separate cells in the prisons. If the slave of a Jew or Moor adopted Judaism or Mohammedanism, he had to be set free and was required to leave the island.

James II (1291–1327) confirmed the Jews in all the privileges conferred on them by his predecessor: he also allowed them to build a synagogue in the new "Calle" (Jews' quarter), and to own a cemetery. Unlike the Jews of Aragon, the Jews from the Balearic Isles were exempt from the duty of furnishing beds and bread to the royal family or to the governor. Moreover, they were not forced to pay the special taxes demanded of the Jews of Catalonia and Aragon.

== Growth of intolerance ==
The Jews of Mallorca, Menorca, and Ibiza always formed one congregation. The Christian propaganda, here as well as elsewhere, grew ever stronger. Endeavors were made to convert Jews, and a similar theological controversy to that which occurred in Aragon took place in 1286. Somewhat later, priests forced themselves into the Jewish quarter; a tumult arose, representative Jews made complaint (1305), and the clergy was absolutely forbidden to enter the Jewish quarter or the homes of Jews unless accompanied by a bailiff or an official of the governor. Fearing expulsion, the fate of their coreligionists in France (1306), the Jews of Mallorca, after the death of the humane James I, addressed themselves (1311) to the new king, Sancho I., with a request for protection; and he confirmed their privileges.

== Persecutions by the Church ==
Evil times for the Jews in the Balearic Isles began with the Council of Vienne (1312), which prohibited all intercourse between Jew and Christian, and urged the clergy to the conversion of Jews. The Jews of the islands converted to Judaism (1314) two Christians from Germany, who had been refused admission to Judaism by a number of Spanish rabbis, even by those of Gerona and Lerida. As soon as Bishop Villanova of Mallorca heard of the conversion, he imposed a fine of 150,000 florins on the Jews. The king confiscated their books and all their personal property and real estate, and turned their synagogue, which had recently been completed, into a church. On payment of 95,000 florins they were granted immunity from further penalties, and they were allowed to build another synagogue in the place of that taken from them. To raise the enormous sum, the heads of the congregation placed (1315) a tax upon everything—on wine, meat, bread, whatever was bought and used, on their stock of merchandise, and even on new clothes. The tax was to be levied for ten years, and was sanctioned by a royal statute. At the same time a petition was addressed to the king, praying him to restore to the Jews all their former privileges, and to order that in the future no Jew should be forcibly baptized; that a Jew sentenced to death should be hanged, like a Christian, by the head and not by the feet; that the inquisitor should always examine a Jew in the presence of a bailiff or his representative; and that a Jew should be free to have an advocate. The Jews worked hard to pay the fine, and in 1328 the amount was cleared. The avaricious Sancho, in his own interest, granted them freedom to trade, and in 1318 gave them the assurance that neither they nor their descendants should be expelled from the Jewish quarter, which was surrounded with walls and provided with gates.

James II, the nephew of Don Sancho, succeeded him, but was under the guardianship of his uncle Philip. At the beginning of his regency, Philip, in the king's name, confirmed all the privileges of the Jews, and in 1325 bestowed on them the right of citizenship. He protected them from forcible baptism, and strictly forbade the baptism of their children against the parents' will. Permission was granted to them (1331) to build a new synagogue in their quarter, but it was not to be too elaborate. As one means of preventing the erection of a handsome building, James collected all their money into the state treasury. Under Pedro IV (1336–1387), who in 1344 united the Kingdom of Majorca with the Kingdom of Aragon, the Jews of the Balearic Isles lived unmolested, with all their rights safeguarded; but at the time of the hostile agitations against the Jews in Spain their peaceful condition likewise came to an end.

== The Massacre of 1391 ==
The greater the indebtedness of the Christians to the Jews, the more inimical became their attitude. As a result of this state of affairs, the governor of the islands forbade (1390) all Jews to carry weapons, even in their own quarter, or to leave their homes two hours after sunset without carrying a light. After the outbreaks in Valencia and Barcelona (1391), the governor had to interfere for the safety of the Jews' quarter in Palma de Mallorca. On August 24, 1391, the long-dreaded calamity fell upon the community of Mallorca. Jewish homes were sacked, and even the houses of Christians sheltering Jews in concealment were not spared. About 300 Jews were murdered, 800 saved themselves in the royal castle, and the rest underwent forced baptism. When Queen Violante was informed of the outrage, she condemned the inhabitants of the islands to pay a fine of 150,000 florins (or, according to some authorities, 104,000 florins). A year later (1392), however, Juan I granted full amnesty to all who had practiced violence against the Jews or "the Calle," because they had done it for the welfare of king and state; and he further declared all debts of the Christians to the Jews to be null and void.

== Resettlement ==
Soon after the catastrophe of 1391 the Jews began again to settle on the island, and on January 21, 1393, the governor issued an edict for their protection, providing that a citizen who should injure a Jew should be hanged, and that a knight for the same offense should be subjected to the strappado. The advantageous position of the islands, the trading point midway between Catalonia, Provence, and Sicily, attracted thither many of the Jews of Provence and Sicily, besides some from Tunis, Algiers, and other African cities. In the height of their prosperity there were in Mallorca more than a thousand Jewish families. Among those who settled there were a number of people of treacherous character, who acted as informers against their fellow-Jews, and, through malice and envy or to extort money, bore false witness against men of blameless reputation, until, at the request of the community, they were expelled from the island.

The Jews, with the sanction of the king, had their own organizations and secretaries or representatives appointed by themselves. The following are frequently mentioned as acting in that capacity in the first half of the 14th century: Abraham Malaquin, Hayum Cohen, Jucef Barqui, Vital and Judah Cresques, Jacob Cohen, Rafael Dayen, the families Natgar, Sasportas, Xulelli, Moses Ramon, Sadon (Sadoc) b. Dahut (David). The last is probably not the same as the Sayd b. David, who was publicly burned (August 12, 1381) for incontinence with a nun.

== Internal conditions ==
The congregation had the Catalan-African ritual, with regulations similar to those of the congregation at Perpignan: among others was the enactment (1319) that Jews should not wear clothes of finer material than that specified in the code of the organisation. Transgressors of this law were to be punished bodily after the king's consent had been obtained, or were to be excommunicated.

== Renewed oppression, 1413 ==
The Jews of the islands soon forgot their bitter experiences of 1391. The Island Jews became wealthier and more secular, assumed Christian names, and intermarried with Christians. The ethnocentrism of the passionate folk of Mallorca, however, was nourished by the anti-Semitic Ferdinand of Aragon (1412–16), who issued a decree against the Jews (March 20, 1413), by which they were compelled to dwell exclusively in the Jewish quarter, and were forbidden to eat or drink with Christians; to employ Christian nurses or other servants; to attend Christian marriages or funerals; to adopt the title "Don"; to hold any public office; to carry weapons, such as swords or daggers; to use any costly material for their clothes; to wear silk, fur, or any ornaments; to sell any foodstuffs to Christians; to make them gifts of pastry, meats, or drinks; to be physicians to them, or to give them any medicine. Moreover, they had to wear the badge that marked the Jew. Christian women, whether married or unmarried, and courtesans, were strictly prohibited from visiting the Jews' quarter by day or night. Jews who wished to be baptized were not to be deterred by anyone from their resolve; and the officers of the king were ordered to prevent Jewish women converted to Christianity from emigrating to Africa, since they reverted to Judaism when there and sent for their children to follow them. Toward the end of August, 1415, Vincent Ferrer came to Mallorca to convert the Jews, and pursued this work for nearly six months.

== Uprising in 1435 ==
Twenty years later (1435), the calamity dreaded by Simon Duran occurred. To set the people against the Jews, a rumor was spread that the Jews of Palma had crucified a Saracen during Holy Week. The Jews charged with this crime were promptly put in chains. Their fellow-Jews interceded, and at the bidding of the governor they were removed from the episcopal keep and taken to the state prison. The clergy, enraged at this step, incited people against the governor, and still more violently against the Jews. A tribunal, composed chiefly of Dominicans and Franciscans, was formed and resorted to torture as a means of gaining information. One of the imprisoned Jews was stretched on the rack; he confessed to everything asked of him, and named as partners in the crime all whose names were suggested to him. A merchant, Astruc Sibili, asked to see the governor, his request was accepted, and he blamed the whole Jewish community for the offence. This led to a riot in Palma, in which Christians chased the Jews into the mountains. The infuriated mob found most of the Jews involved, dragged them from their hiding-places, and led them back to Palma in exultation. After five days' proceedings, the expectant populace was notified of the sentence pronounced on the Jews. Astruc Sibili and three accomplices were to be burned alive, but in case they submitted to baptism their sentence would be "reduced" to dying upon the gallows. Astruc Sibili accepted baptism, and all the others seduced by promises followed his example. On the representations of the clergy, the governor granted them their lives.

A few faithful Jews succeeded in making their escape. The synagogue had been ruined several years before, and though now and then a Jew settled on the islands, there came to be practically no Jews there. The Catholic Monarchs passed the Alhambra Decree expelling Jews from Spain, and the Spanish Inquisition began its work. In 1506, twenty-two Jews, condemned, though either dead or absent, were burned in effigy; again, in 1509 and 1510, some Jews were publicly burned in effigy; and in 1511 sixty-two Jews who had escaped from the Inquisition were punished in the same way.

The secret Jews, in great number on the island of Mallorca, were not called "Maranos" or "New Christians," but "people from the Calle" or Chuetas.

A number of well-known rabbis and scholars from Catalonia and Provence dwelt on the island of Mallorca. Among them were: Shem-Tov Falcon, who instituted there a number of ritual observances; Aaron ha-Kohen, who wrote his ritual code, "Orchot Chaim," at Mallorca; Joseph Caspi, a well-known writer; Isaac ben Nathan, diligent translator from the Arabic; and the physicians Moses Rimos and Eleazar Ardot, the latter of whom was born on Mallorca, as was also Simon ben Tsemach Duran.

== British Menorca ==
Menorca became an English possession in 1713, and it willingly proffered an asylum to a number of Jewish families from African cities. A synagogue was soon erected in Mahón. The fact that Jews and Moors were settled there was sufficient reason for Spain to join with France to drive the English from the island. When the Duke of Crillon landed on the island in August 1781, Jews, Greeks, and Moors, three thousand men in all, rose up and threatened the life of the duke. After a short resistance, however, Mahón surrendered and with the English garrison, the Jews abandoned the city and the whole island.

== See also ==
- Xuetas – community of former Jews in Mallorca, persisting to the modern day
- Jewish Quarter of Inca

== Bibliography ==
- Meyer Kayserling, Geschichte der Juden in Spanien und Portugal, i. 155–177
- Idem, Revue Etudes Juives, iv. 31–56, xxxix. 242 et seq., xl. 62 et seq.
- Boletin de la Real Academia de la Historia de Madrid, 1900, xxxvi. 1–5.D. M. K.
