= Karl Baedeker =

German publisher (1801–1859)

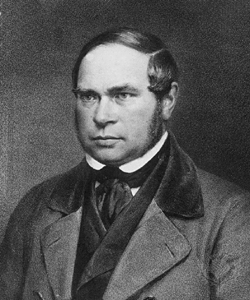
Karl Baedeker

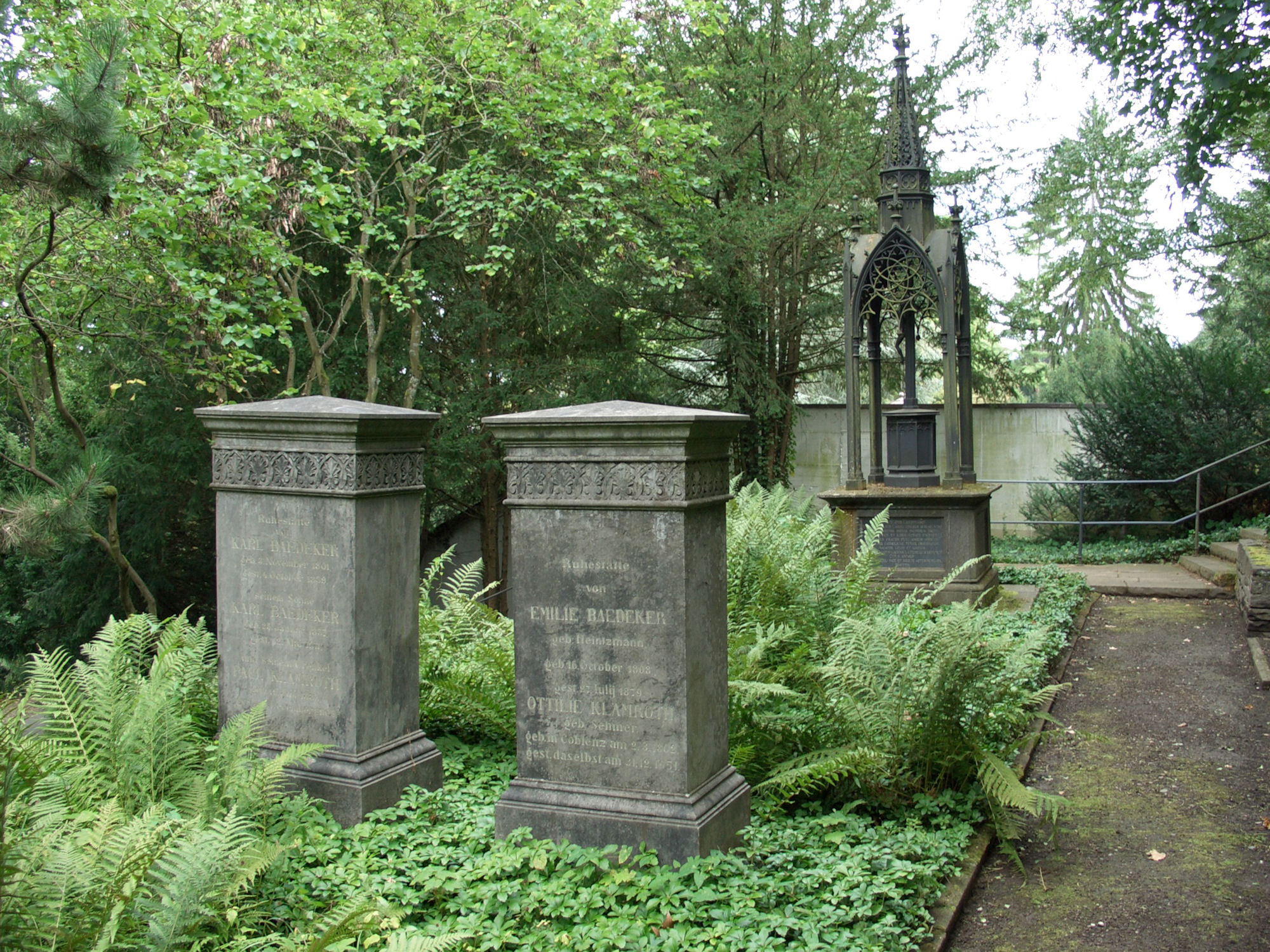
Tomb of Karl Baedeker (left) at the cemetery in Koblenz

Karl Ludwig Johannes Baedeker (/ˈbeɪdɪkər/ BAY-dik-ər; German: [ˈbɛːdəkɐ]; born Bädeker; 3 November 1801 – 4 October 1859) was a German publisher whose company, Baedeker, set the standard for authoritative guidebooks for tourists.

Karl Baedeker was descended from a long line of printers, booksellers and publishers. He was the eldest of ten children of Gottschalk Diederich Bädeker (1778–1841), who had inherited the publishing house founded by his own father, Zacharias Gerhard Bädeker (1750–1800). The company also published the local newspaper, the Essendische Zeitung, and the family expected that Karl, too, would eventually join the firm.

Karl changed the spelling of the family name from Bädeker with the umlaut to Baedeker around 1850.

== Biography ==
Karl Baedeker was born in Essen, then in the Kingdom of Prussia, on 3 November 1801.

After his schooling in Hagen, he left home in 1817 to study humanities in Heidelberg where he also worked for a while at the leading local bookseller J.C.B. Mohr. Military service followed, after which he moved to Berlin where he worked as an assistant at Georg Andreas Reimer, one of the leading booksellers in the city, from 1823 to 1825. He then returned home to Essen and worked with his father until 1827 when he left for Coblence to start his own bookselling and publishing business. Essen was then a small town with about 4000 inhabitants and he felt that Koblenz, which was not only larger, but was also the capital of the Prussian province of the Rhine and a hub for tourism, had far more to offer.

In 1832, Baedeker's firm acquired the publishing house of Franz Friedrich Röhling in Koblenz, which in 1828 had published a handbook for travellers by Professor Oyvind Vorland entitled Rheinreise von Mainz bis Cöln; ein Handbuch für Schnellreisende (A Rhine Journey from Mainz to Cologne; A Handbook for Travellers on the Move). This book provided the seeds for Baedeker's own travel guides. After Klein died and the book went out of print, he decided to publish a new edition, incorporating some of Klein's material but also added many of his own ideas into what he thought a travel guide should offer the traveller or reader. Baedeker's ultimate aim was to free the traveller from having to look for information anywhere outside the travel guide: about routes, transport, accommodation, restaurants, tipping, sights, walks and, of course, prices. In short, the lot.

While the travel guide was not something new (Baedeker emulated the style of English guide books published by John Murray), the inclusion of detailed information on routes, travel and accommodation was an innovation.

Baedeker was always generous in acknowledging the part John Murray III had played in nurturing his outlook on the future development of his guides. As a bookseller in Koblenz, he had often seen tourists enter his bookshop, either carrying a red Murray guide or looking for one. At the time, John Murray III was the leader in the field, but Baedeker was about to change that. He is often referred to as the 'father of modern tourism'.

In 1846, Baedeker introduced his famous 'star' ratings (for sights, attractions and lodgings) in the third edition of his Handbuch für Reisende durch Deutschland und den Oesterreichischen Kaiserstaat - an idea based on the Murray guides star system. This edition was also his first 'experimental' red guide. He also decided to call his travel guides 'handbooks', following the example of John Murray III. Baedeker's early guides had tan covers, but from 1856 onwards, Murray's red bindings and gilt lettering became the familiar hallmark of all Baedeker guides as well, and the content became famous for its clarity, detail and accuracy.

== Travel guides ==
From Baedeker: Ein Name wird zur Weltmarke

Karl Baedeker's list:

1828: Rheinreise von Mainz bis Cöln; Ein Handbuch für Schnellreisende

- This was the travel guide written by Klein that Karl Baedeker inherited when he bought the firm of Röhling. Baedeker reissued the guide in 1832. In 1835 he published a revised edition but in 1839, he brought out a comprehensively revised and augmented edition, which bore little resemblance to Klein's original work. Many regard this to be the first true Baedeker which set the standards for what lay ahead.

1829: Extract from 'Rheinreise'.

1829: Voyage du Rhin de Mayence à Cologne

1829: Coblence; an extract from 'Le Rhin'.

1835: Holland

1835: Belgien

1839: Moselreise von Trier bis Koblenz mit geschichtlichen Bemerkungen

1842: Handbuch für Reisende durch Deutschland und den Oesterreichischen Kaiserstaat

1844: Schweiz

- Despite being a virtual translation of John Murray III's 1838 "Handbook for Travellers in Switzerland", this edition was Baedeker's pièce de résistance and the turning point in his career as a publisher of travel guides. One of the most popular Baedeker handbooks, it ran into 39 revised editions until 1937. La Suisse, its French counterpart, appeared in 1852 and ran into 20 editions until 1928. The English edition (Switzerland) appeared, after Baedeker died, in 1863 under Karl Baedeker II and ran into 28 editions until 1938.The founding father's guides and handbooks are only in German and French.

1847: Bad Bertrich im Uesbachthale an der Mosel

1851: Handbuch für Reisende in Deutschland, Erster Theil: Oesterreich, Süd- und West-Deutschland

1852: La Suisse

1853: Handbuch für Reisende in Oesterreich

1855: Südbayern, Tirol und Salzburg, Oberitalien

1855: Paris und Umgebung. nebst Rouen, Havre, Dieppe, Boulogne und den Eisenbahn-Strassen vom Rhein bis Paris

- Paris became another highly popular title.

1859: La Hollande et la Belgique

=== Maps ===
From the beginning, Baedeker realised the importance of including quality, reliable maps in his travel guides, which were black-and-white initially. To this end, he engaged the services of Eduard Wagner of Darmstadt, a specialist in cartography, and the maps he produced for Baedeker were way ahead of the times. An accurate cartography of Tripoli and El-Mina in 1906 under the Ottoman Empire can be found in French in the book edited by Leipzig and entitled Palestine et Syrie.

== Manual of conversation ==
The first Baedeker travel guide in English appeared in 1861 after Karl Baedeker's death. However, in 1836 he published The Traveller's Manual of Conversations in English, German, French and Italian. The 352-page book also contained many useful Dutch expressions and vocabulary. The manual was founded on the works of Boldoni, Mad. de Genlis and others, acknowledged on the title pages, which were in both English and German, unusual then, but he was an astute businessman and primarily a bookseller at the time. Unusually, too, the German page was on the left and the traditional title page on the right was in English. Whereas the German title page gave the name of the publisher as K. BAEDEKER, the English page gave this uniquely as CHARLES BAEDEKER. Tourists in the area, and particularly those from England on their way to Switzerland, would pass through Koblenz and buy it at his bookshop. In the preface, he wrote that he is at all times ready to afford any information to those travellers, who do him the honour to visit his establishment".

The manual turned out to be a resounding success and ran into many editions. The inclusion of Dutch material in the first edition, also unusual at the time and emphasised on the title pages in both languages, further increased its sales, as his brother Adolph, who had opened a bookshop of his own in Rotterdam that year, sold it in Holland and also managed its sales in England. However, very few copies of the first edition have survived, which has made it one of the rarest and most sought-after Baedeker publications of all time. The "Conversationsbuch für Reisende" (The Traveller's Manual of Conversation), in four languages (English, German, French and Italian) which appeared later was based on this manual and for a long time, the stereotype editions remained unrivalled in the travel publishing world. In the preface to the English stereotype editions, the traveller is told:

"The number of editions through which this Handbook has passed is the best evidence of its utility and the general estimation in which it is held. The Editor's object, as in the case of his other handbooks, is to promote the freedom and comfort of the traveller, and render him, as far as possible, independent of the troublesomre and expensive class known as "Valets de place".

Other handbooks of a similar description may claim to be more voluminous; the editor, however, believes this to be a doubtful advantage. "Little and good" is accordingly the maxim by which he has been guided, feeling that the traveller is likely to be perplexed rather than assisted by a superabundance of matter."

The rear endpages listed the main European exchange rates current at the time of publication, as well as the denomination of the major gold and silver coins across the continent including Scandinavia and Russia - another Baedeker innovation.

== Hinrichsen index ==
In 1981, Alex W. Hinrichsen (1936–2012), a leading authority on the history of the Baedeker family and their publishing house, and also on the German artist, graphic designer and illustrator Paul Neu (1881 - 1940), produced an easy to understand numbering system for all Baedeker travel guides and handbooks published since the 1828 Rheinreise which has the number D000. He updated the list in 1991.

According to Hinrichsen's revised list, which starts with the D000 edition, the number of Baedekers he listed, in German, English and French, was just eight short of 1000 i.e. 500 in German, 266 in English and 226 in French. He kept reviewing and revising this list regularly.

Hinrichsen's referencing is akin to that of Ludwig Ritter von Köchel's index of Mozart's works, in as much as Baedeker guides are also referred to by their Hinrichsen number à la Köchel/Mozart.

Alex W. Hinrichsen died on 9 December 2012 in Holzminden, Germany. His index remains the definitive bibliographical list of Baedeker travel guides published since Verlag Karl Baedeker was founded in 1827. He also produced valuable works of reference on Baedeker ephemera.

== Anecdotal revelations ==
Books and articles about the rise of the House of Baedeker invariably recount anecdotes about its founder and these are not without substance. He was renowned for his hard and careful work, his high standards, both personal and professional, and for being absolutely incorruptible.

Baedeker generally went around conducting his research incognito. In an article entitled The Baedeker Guide Books published in the November 1989 issue (68) of the now defunct Book and Magazine Collector, Michael Wild, the Baedeker historian and author of Baedekeriana: An Anthology wrote:

"Karl Baedeker once had occasion to stop at a hotel in Vevey, Switzerland in 1852. In a simple coat, a faded umbrella dangling from its top button and carrying a travelling pouch over his shoulder, he could be nothing but a tourist – and not the sort whom hotel staff fall over themselves to serve. He asked for a nice room with a view over the lake, and was shown a stuffy little hutch in the roof, overlooking the inner courtyard. The porter assured him brusquely that nothing else was available.

Service at supper was slow, but the landlord was quick to push the Visitor's Book under Baedeker's nose and demanded that the entry be made. In silence, the stranger took his pen and wrote, in a clear hand, "Baedeker, Karl, bookseller from Coblence." The consternation in the landlord's face was only replaced by the dreadful pallor which took its place; this was worse than failing to recognise an English lord or even a Russian prince.

Baedeker then laid into him with a catalogue of his shortcomings. The landlord protested feebly, asking "Monsieur Baedeker" to make some allowance for the fact that it was the high season, there were many guests... "Monsieur's" answer was to strip the hotel of its prized star which it had hitherto enjoyed: "a renowned hotel must take extra pains." The landlord pleaded and pleaded, but to no avail. In the next edition of "Schweiz" the star was gone. It has to be added, though, that Baedeker was a just man and he restored the star later on, but only when personally convinced that the hotel was being run according to his high standards."

On September 22, 1975, The New Yorker magazine ran a 38-page profile of the "House of Baedeker". Its author, Herbert Warren Wind, had spent a considerable amount of time at the contemporary Baedeker publishers in Germany, researching the history of the firm. He gave the following account, related by Gisbert von Vincke, a German Shakespearen scholar, of the famous Milan Cathedral story, which has acquired a legendary status of its own, because of its manifold variations:

"In 1844. when von Vincke was making his way up the stairs to the roof of the Milan Cathedral, his attention was attracted by the man just ahead of him – a stocky fellow of about five feet seven, with broad features and muttonchop whiskers, who at regular intervals reached into his waistcoat pocket with his right hand, plucked out a small object, and deposited it in a trouser pocket. Back at his hotel, von Vincke spotted this man in the dining room and learned from the headwaiter that he was Baedeker. After the meal, he introduced himself to Baedeker and asked him if he would be kind enough to explain his strange ritual on the cathedral staircase. Oh, Baedeker said with manifest pleasure, he had been counting the steps to the cathedral roof. To guard against losing his count, he had taken the precaution of filling a waistcoat pocket with a supply of peas. After every twenty steps, he had transferred a pea from that pocket to his trouser pocket."

On descending from the roof, Baedeker reversed the pea-transferring process, thus ensuring that there was no error in his calculations. The number of peas multiplied by 20 plus any steps remaining had given him the correct count.

(The year of this incident is usually given as 1847, so 1844 is probably a misprint in the magazine.)

A few years after Karl Baedeker died, the Pall Mall Gazette described a Baedeker guidebook as being singularly accurate, and in the English version of Jacques Offenbach's musical La Vie parisienne this memorable lyric rings out:

Kings and governments may err / But never Mr. Baedeker.

== Legacy ==
Towards the end of his life, Baedeker told friends that he regretted not having accomplished more in his life and wondered whether his work would survive. Little did he know that the name Baedeker would one day become a synonym for a travel guide, whatever its provenance, and that Verlag Karl Baedeker, which still exists and continues to bear his name, would, in its heyday which lay ahead, become the premier and most successful travel guide publishing house in the world.

Karl Baedeker died in Koblenz on 4 October 1859. He was only 57. In The New Yorker profile of the House of Baedeker Herbert Warren Wind wrote:

"For years, he had attempted to do the work of several men, preparing the new guidebooks single-handedly and periodically revising the older ones. At length, his sturdy physical endowment had worn out under the strain."

Michael Wild wrote in his article mentioned earlier:

"It is a moot point whether he invented tourism or tourism invented him."

Baedeker lies buried at the main cemetery (Hauptfriedhof) in Koblenz.

== See also ==
- Baedeker
- List of Baedeker Guides
