= Jewish quarter of Inca =

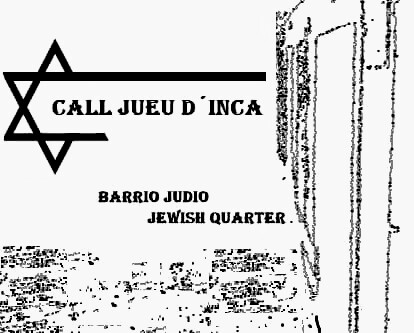
Jewish Quarter Logo

Inca is a town of 30,000 inhabitants located at the center of the island of Mallorca in the Spanish province of Islas Baleares.

== Creation ==
A Jewish population is known to have existed on Inca since Jaume I conquered Mallorca in 1229, although their presence had already been reported by Severus, bishop of Menorca, in the 5th century.

The origin of the Jewish quarter (named call in Catalan) dates from a 1346 order issued by king Peter IV of Aragon upon request from the Governor of Mallorca, Gilabert de Centelles, because of disturbances caused by the mostly Christian inhabitants of Inca, who were displeased with the widespread presence of Jews in the town.

The Governor's lieutenant, Berenguer de Oms, aided by an advisor, made the first proposal for a location for the Jewish quarter. The Jewish community directly informed the king about their refusal of the proposed location because the place known as "Carrer d'en Prats" had houses in utter disrepair. King Peter IV agreed and informed Gilabert de Centelles about the reservations the Jews had about the place, and ordered that a legal expert trusted by the community be appointed to pick a proper location.

Because Gilabert de Centelles was due to travel to Valencia and Catalonia on royal business, he delegated the task on Guillermo de Lagostera, who arrived at Inca in 1353 together with legal expert Ramon de Capeir as well as Jaume de Buadella, who was a jury in Palma de Mallorca. They met with the juries of Inca and the secretaries of the aljama and reached an agreement on the place called "Carrer d'en Pascolet."

From then on, economic troubles began. The already existing houses were confiscated, and Jews were charged a price for them that owners did not accept. A period of almost 24 years of constant reclamations to the Governor and to the King ensued. The King decreed that the difference between the appraised value of the houses and the amount paid for them would need to be covered by the University of Inca, which sparked confrontations between house owners and the university.

A committee of two Christians and two Jews was appointed to negotiate the sale and rent prices for the houses in the call, but the University sent a written complaint to the King and the whole process was paralyzed for 10 years. The Governor then gave the order to comply with the King's mandate and resume the process, but it was not actually done until 1363, under new Governor Bernardo de Tous. A new appraisal committee, with two Christians named Montroig and Palou, and two Jews named Faquim and Fallux, was chosen.

No written record of the place exists between 1363 and 1372. It is known that the previous owners of the confiscated houses appealed to the authorities with new complaints about the prices.

In 1372, the secretaries of the aljama filed a complaint because routine attacks by Christians on Jews were pushing Jews to leave. Governor Tous ordered the building of two gates to keep the Jewish quarter enclosed so Christians would not assault Jews. Until then only one gate had existed, called En Reboll.

Jews are believed to have taken possession of the call between September and October 1372.

In 1391, at the time when Christians were launching attacks on Jewish communities in Aragon and Castile, the ones in Inca and Palma suffered a similar fate, and houses and businesses were burned down.

== Historical importance ==
The Jewish quarter of Inca can be considered the secondary aljama of Mallorca. The main one was in Palma, but beginning in 1383 the secretaries of the aljama in Palma delegated functions on their peers in Inca, making the community effectively independent. This arrangement was short-lived as the neighborhood was destroyed in 1391 and most of the survivors converted to Christianity.

All evidences indicate that the call had a synagogue. In documents from 1392, convert Bartomeua claimed inheritance rights on properties owned by her grandfather "Jucef Ben Baharon, rabbi of the Jewish School of the Call."

In the town map made by Dr. Sebastià Sans in 1808, the Jewish quarter appears as "El Call" and numbered with 10.

Based on an investigation conducted by Antoni Ginard, Joan Estrany and Francesca Tugores at the University of the Balearic Islands, Jeroni de Berard is currently believed to have made in 1790 the oldest map of Inca, later used by his sometimes collaborator Sebastià Sans to make his own in 1808.

The owners of the house of Can Monroig, formerly known as Can Mora, carried out a process of total restoration. During the excavation, they found architectural remains and pottery likely dating from the call or Muslim times.

== Current location ==
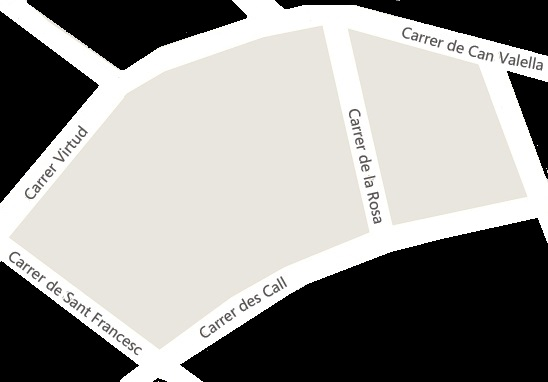
Jewish Quarter of Inca

The Jewish call can be found between Sant Francesc, Virtut, Can Valella, Pare Cerdà, El Call, and La Rosa streets.

== Population ==
Approximately 306 people are estimated to have lived in the call, most of which worked in crafts and trading.
