= List of Baedeker Guides =

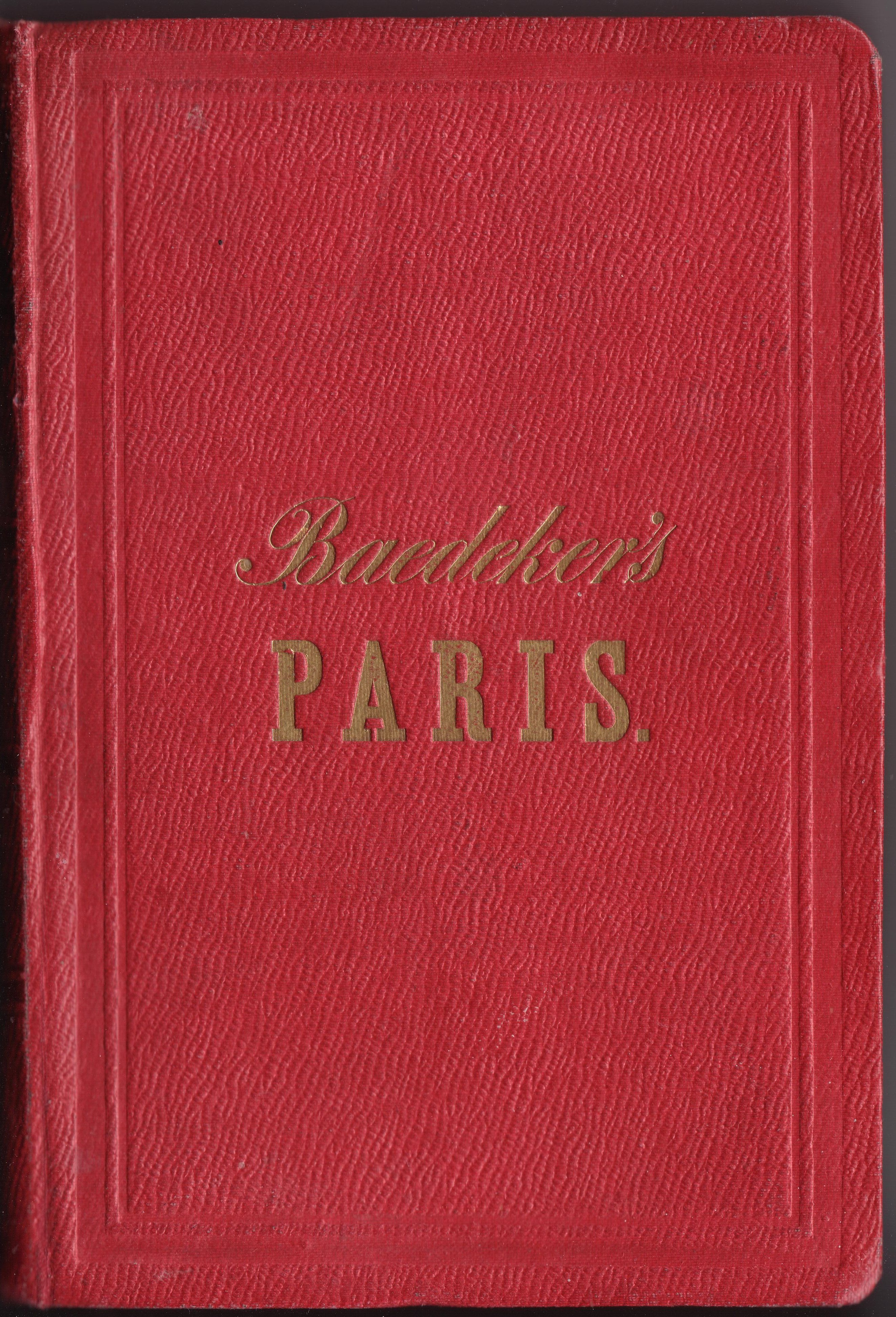
Baedeker's Paris, 1860

Baedeker Guides are travel guide books published by the Karl Baedeker firm of Germany beginning in the 1830s.

== List of Baedeker guides by year of publication ==
=== 1850s (in German) ===
- Die Schweiz. Handbuch für Reisende, nach eigener Anschauung und den besten Hülfsquellen bearbeitet (5th ed.), Coblenz: Karl Baedeker, 1854, OCLC 40530640
- Handbuch für Reisende in Deutschland und dem Oesterreichischen Kaiserstaat, vol. 1 (6th ed.), Coblenz: Karl Baedeker, 1855, hdl:2027/hvd.hnnsed, OCLC 991880404
- Die Rheinlande von der Schweizer bis zur Holländischen Grenze (9th ed.), Coblenz: Karl Baedeker, 1856, hdl:2027/hvd.hnnyc7, OCLC 793694443
- Deutschland und das österreichische Ober-Italien: Handbuch für Reisende (8th ed.), Coblenz: Karl Baedeker, 1858, hdl:2027/hvd.hnnsec, OCLC 794648931
- Die Schweiz, die italienischen seen, Mailand, Turin, Genua: Handbuch für Reisende (8th ed.), Coblenz: Karl Baedeker, 1859, hdl:2027/hvd.hnnsec, OCLC 29490441
- La Suisse, les lacs italiens, Milan, Turin, Gênes et Nice: Manuel du Voyageur (in French) (4th ed.), Coblenz: Karl Baedeker, 1859, hdl:2027/uva.x001702608, OCLC 887682060

=== 1860s ===
- Switzerland: with the Neighboring Lakes of Northern Italy, Savoy, and the Adjacent Districts of Piedmont, Lombardy and the Tyrol, Coblenz: Karl Baedeker, 1863, OCLC 03054781
- Manuel de conversation pour le Voyageur en Quatre Langues (in French, German, English, and Italian), Coblenz: Karl Baedeker, 1864, hdl:2027/uc1.$b624218, OCLC 758771647
- Paris and northern France, Coblenz: Karl Baedeker, 1867, OCLC 22685197
- Italy, Coblenz: Karl Baedeker, 1867–1868, OCLC 03122521
  - Part 1 (Northern Italy, as far as Leghorn, Florence, and Ancona, and the Island of Corsica) at the Internet Archive
  - Part 2 (Central Italy and Rome) at the Internet Archive
  - Part 3 (Southern Italy, Sicily, the Lipari Islands) at the Internet Archive
- Switzerland: with the Neighboring Lakes of Northern Italy, Savoy, and the Adjacent Districts of Piedmont, Lombardy and the Tyrol (4th rev. and augm. ed.), Coblenz: Karl Baedeker, 1867, OCLC 05279135
- Belgium and Holland, Coblenz: Karl Baedeker, 1869, OCLC 18168820.
- Italy (2nd ed.), Coblenz: Karl Baedeker, 1869–1870, OCLC 01637141.
  - Part 1 (Northern Italy and Corsica) at the Internet Archive
  - Part 2 (Central Italy and Rome)
  - Part 3 (Southern Italy, Sicily, and excursions to the Lipari Islands, Tunis, Sardinia, Malta, and Athens) at the Internet Archive (or Part 3 (Southern Italy and Sicily) at the Internet Archive)

=== 1870s ===
==== 1871 ====
- Belgium and Holland (2nd ed.), Coblenz: Karl Baedeker, 1871, OCLC 10782543.
- Southern Germany and Austria (2nd ed.), Coblenz: Karl Baedeker, 1871, OCLC 4090237, OL 20619468M

==== 1872 ====
- Italy (3rd ed.), Coblenz: Karl Baedeker, 1872–1874, OCLC 00610890.
  - Part 1 (Northern Italy, including Leghorn, Florence, and Ancona, and the Island of Corsica) at the Internet Archive
  - Part 2 (Central Italy and Rome) at the Internet Archive
  - Part 3 (Southern Italy and Sicily)
- Paris and Northern France (3rd ed.), Coblenz: Karl Baedeker, 1872, OCLC 12996798.
- Switzerland, and the adjacent portions of Italy, Savoy, and the Tyrol (5th ed.), Coblenz: Karl Baedeker, 1872, OCLC 09941009.

==== 1873 ====
- Italy (4th ed.), Coblenz: Karl Baedeker, 1873–1877, OCLC 31899009.
  - Part 1 (Northern Italy, including Leghorn, Florence, Ravenna, The Island of Corsica, and Routes Through France, Switzerland, and Austria) at the Internet Archive
  - Part 2 (Central Italy and Rome) at the Internet Archive
  - Part 3 (Southern Italy and Sicily) at the Internet Archive
- Northern Germany (5th ed.), Coblenz: Karl Baedeker, 1873, OCLC 5947482
- The Rhine, from Rotterdam to Constance (5th ed.), Coblenz: Karl Baedeker, 1873, OCLC 02027251
- Southern Germany and Austria, including the eastern Alps (3rd ed.), Coblenz: Karl Baedeker, 1873, OCLC 16840876
- Switzerland, and the adjacent portions of Italy, Savoy, and the Tyrol (6th ed.), Coblenz: Karl Baedeker, 1873, OCLC 05845210.

==== 1874 ====
- Paris and its environs, with routes from London to Paris, and from Paris to the Rhine and Switzerland (4th ed.), Coblenz: Karl Baedeker, 1874, OCLC 04038243.

==== 1875 ====
- Belgium and Holland (4th ed.), Coblenz: Karl Baedeker, 1875, OCLC 01971963.
- Italy (5th ed.), Coblenz: Karl Baedeker, 1875–1879, OCLC 31899008.
  - Part 1 (Northern Italy, including Leghorn, Florence, Ravenna, The Island of Corsica, and Routes Through France, Switzerland, and Austria) at the Internet Archive
  - Part 2 (Central Italy and Rome) at the Internet Archive
  - Part 3 (Southern Italy and Sicily) at the Internet Archive

==== 1876 ====
- Italy (6th ed.), Coblenz: Karl Baedeker, 1876–1879, OCLC 01648606.
  - Part 1 (Northern Italy, including Leghorn, Florence, Ravenna, The Island of Corsica, and Routes Through France, Switzerland, and Austria) at the Internet Archive
  - Part 2 (Central Italy and Rome) at the Internet Archive
  - Part 3 (Southern Italy and Sicily) at the Internet Archive
- Palestine and Syria, Leipzig: Karl Baedeker, 1876, OCLC 02950227.

==== 1877 ====
- Baedeker, Karl (1877), Northern Germany: Handbook for Travellers (6th ed.), Leipzig: Karl Baedeker, OCLC 03018979, Wikidata Q140795858
- Switzerland, and the adjacent portions of Italy, Savoy and the Tyrol (7th ed.), Leipzig: Karl Baedeker, 1877, OCLC 09941114.

==== 1878 ====
- Belgium and Holland (5th ed.), Leipzig: Karl Baedeker, 1878, OCLC 10865696.
- Egypt, Leipzig: Karl Baedeker, 1878–1892, OCLC 02031064.
  - Part 1 (Lower Egypt, with the Fayum and the Peninsula of Sinai) at the Internet Archive
- London and its environs, including excursions to Brighton, the Isle of Wight, etc., Leipzig: Karl Baedeker, 1878, OCLC 02962434.
- Paris and its environs, with routes from London to Paris, and from Paris to the Rhine and Switzerland (6th ed.), Leipzig: Karl Baedeker, 1878, OCLC 08489825.
- The Rhine, from Rotterdam to Constance (6th ed.), Leipzig: Karl Baedeker, 1878, OCLC 10858869.

==== 1879 ====
- The Eastern Alps, Including the Bavarian Highlands, the Tyrol, Salzkammergut, Styria, and Carinthia (4th ed.), Leipzig: Karl Baedeker, 1879, OL 20470844M
- London and its environs, including excursions to Brighton, the Isle of Wight, etc. (2nd ed.), Leipzig: Karl Baedeker, 1878, OCLC 03018953.
- Norway and Sweden, Leipzig: Karl Baedeker, 1879, OCLC 13866645
- Switzerland, and the adjacent portions of Italy, Savoy and the Tyrol (8th ed.), Leipzig: Karl Baedeker, 1879, OCLC 03054814.

=== 1880s ===
==== 1880 ====
- Italy (7th ed.), Leipzig: Karl Baedeker, 1880–1881, OCLC 12348490.
  - Part 1 (Northern Italy, including Leghorn, Florence, Ravenna, The Island of Corsica, and Routes Through France, Switzerland, and Austria) at the Internet Archive
  - Part 2 (Central Italy and Rome) at the Internet Archive
  - Part 3 (Southern Italy and Sicily, with Excursions into the Liparia Islands, Malta, Sardinia, Tunis, and Corfu ) at the Internet Archive
- Southern Germany and Austria, including Hungary and Transylvania (4th ed.), Leipzig: Karl Baedeker, 1880, OCLC 03764032

==== 1881 ====
- Belgium and Holland (6th ed.), Leipzig: Karl Baedeker, 1881, OCLC 01648545
- Northern Germany (7th ed.), Leipzig: Karl Baedeker, 1881, OCLC 08942406.
- Paris and its environs, with routes from London to Paris, and from Paris to the Rhine and Switzerland (7th ed.), Leipzig: Karl Baedeker, 1881, OCLC 04019961.
- Switzerland, and the adjacent portions of Italy, Savoy and the Tyrol (9th ed.), Leipzig: Karl Baedeker, 1881, OCLC 04038453.

==== 1882 ====
- Norway and Sweden (2nd ed.), Leipzig: Karl Baedeker, 1882, OCLC 08534519
- The Rhine from Rotterdam to Constance (8th ed.), Leipzig: Karl Baedeker, 1882, OCLC 7416969

==== 1883 ====
- The Eastern Alps, Including the Bavarian Highlands, the Tyrol, Salzkammergut, Styria, Carinthia, Carniola, and Ithria (5th ed.), Leipzig: Karl Baedeker, 1883, OCLC 01678874
- Italy (8th ed.), Leipzig: Karl Baedeker, 1883–1889, OCLC 10865626.
  - Part 1 (Northern Italy, including Leghorn, Florence, Ravenna, The Island of Corsica, and Routes Through France, Switzerland, and Austria) at the Internet Archive
  - Part 2 (Central Italy and Rome) at the Internet Archive
  - Part 3 (Southern Italy and Sicily, with Excursions into the Liparia Islands, Malta, Sardinia, Tunis, and Corfu)
- Southern Germany and Austria, including the eastern Alps (5th ed.), Coblenz: Karl Baedeker, 1883, OCLC 06565439

==== 1884 ====
- Belgium and Holland (7th ed.), Leipzig: Karl Baedeker, 1884, OCLC 19022249
- Northern Germany (8th ed.), Leipzig: Karl Baedeker, 1884, OCLC 01637082.
- Paris and its environs, with routes from London to Paris, and from Paris to the Rhine and Switzerland (8th ed.), Leipzig: Karl Baedeker, 1884, OCLC 01335521.

==== 1885 ====
- Egypt (2nd ed.), Leipzig: Karl Baedeker, 1885, OCLC 08608955
  - Part 1 (Lower Egypt, with the Fayum and the peninsula of Sinai) at the Internet Archive
  - Part 2 (Upper Egypt, with Nubia, as far as the Second Cataract and the Western Oases) at the Internet Archive
- Belgium and Holland (8th ed.), Leipzig: Karl Baedeker, 1885, OCLC 02343524
- Norway and Sweden (3rd ed.), Leipzig: Karl Baedeker, 1885, OCLC 10288659

==== 1886 ====
- Italy (9th ed.), Leipzig: Karl Baedeker, 1886–1892, OCLC 10866352.
  - Part 1 (Northern Italy, including Leghorn, Florence, Ravenna, The Island of Corsica, and Routes Through France, Switzerland, and Austria) at the Internet Archive
  - Part 2 (Central Italy and Rome) at the Internet Archive
  - Part 3 (Southern Italy and Sicily, with Excursions into the Liparia Islands, Malta, Sardinia, Tunis, and Corfu ) at the Internet Archive
- Northern Germany (9th ed.), Leipzig: Karl Baedeker, 1886, OCLC 06220985.
- The Rhine from Rotterdam to Constance (10th ed.), Leipzig: Karl Baedeker, 1886, OCLC 06302332

==== 1887 ====
- London and Its Environs (6th ed.), Leipzig: Karl Baedeker, 1887, OL 20608555M
- Southern Germany and Austria, including Hungary and Transylvania (6th ed.), Leipzig: Karl Baedeker, 1887, OCLC 02008565
- Switzerland, and the adjacent portions of Italy, Savoy and the Tyrol (12th ed.), Leipzig: Karl Baedeker, 1887, OCLC 06172453.

==== 1888 ====
- Belgium and Holland (9th ed.), Leipzig: Karl Baedeker, 1888, OCLC 05970948
- The Eastern Alps, Including the Bavarian Highlands, the Tyrol, Salzkammergut, Styria, Carinthia, Carniola, and Ithria (6th ed.), Leipzig: Karl Baedeker, 1888, OCLC 02699377
- Paris and its environs, with routes from London to Paris, and from Paris to the Rhine and Switzerland (9th ed.), Leipzig: Karl Baedeker, 1888, OCLC 01464139.

==== 1889 ====
- Greece, Leipzig: Karl Baedeker, 1889, OCLC 03757021
- London and Its Environs (7th ed.), Leipzig: Karl Baedeker, 1889, OCLC 04609447
- Northern France, from Belgium and the English Channel to the Loire, excluding Paris and its Environs, Leipzig: Karl Baedeker, 1889, OCLC 02711578
- Norway and Sweden (4th ed.), Leipzig: Karl Baedeker, 1889, OCLC 02383830
- The Rhine from Rotterdam to Constance (11th ed.), Leipzig: Karl Baedeker, 1889, OCLC 04250198
- Switzerland, and the adjacent portions of Italy, Savoy and the Tyrol (13th ed.), Leipzig: Karl Baedeker, 1889, OCLC 02363495.

=== 1890s ===
==== 1890 ====
- Great Britain (2nd ed.), Leipzig: K. Baedeker, 1890, OCLC 04111991
- Italy (10th ed.), Leipzig: Karl Baedeker, 1890–1895, OCLC 17417033.
  - Part 1 (Northern Italy, including Leghorn, Florence, Ravenna, The Island of Corsica, and Routes Through France, Switzerland, and Austria) at the Internet Archive
  - Part 2 (Central Italy and Rome) at the Internet Archive
  - Part 3 (Southern Italy and Sicily, with Excursions into the Liparia Islands, Malta, Sardinia, Tunis, and Corfu ) at the Internet Archive
- Northern Germany (10th ed.), Leipzig: Karl Baedeker, 1890, OCLC 04509827.

==== 1891 ====
- Belgium and Holland (10th ed.), Leipzig: Karl Baedeker, 1891, OCLC 5624932, OL 23280595M
- The Eastern Alps, Including the Bavarian Highlands, the Tyrol, Salzkammergut, Styria, Carinthia, Carniola, and Ithria (7th ed.), Leipzig: Karl Baedeker, 1891, OCLC 03558036
- Paris and its environs, with routes from London to Paris, and from Paris to the Rhine and Switzerland (10th ed.), Leipzig: Karl Baedeker, 1891, OCLC 04872435.
- Southern France, from the Loire to the Spanish and Italian frontiers, including Corsica, Leipzig: Karl Baedeker, 1891, OCLC 03030499
- Southern Germany and Austria, including Hungary, Dalmatia and Bosnia (7th ed.), Leipzig: Karl Baedeker, 1891, OCLC 01028235.
- Switzerland, and the adjacent portions of Italy, Savoy and the Tyrol (14th ed.), Leipzig: Karl Baedeker, 1891, OCLC 01027094.

==== 1892 ====
- London and Its Environs (8th ed.), Leipzig: Karl Baedeker, 1892, OCLC 00406445
- Norway and Sweden (5th ed.), Leipzig: Karl Baedeker, 1892, OCLC 09701999
- The Rhine from Rotterdam to Constance (12th ed.), Leipzig: Karl Baedeker, 1892, OCLC 06459504

==== 1893 ====
- Italy (11th ed.), Leipzig: Karl Baedeker, 1893–1899, OCLC 10866333.
  - Part 1 (Northern Italy, including Leghorn, Florence, Ravenna, and Routes Through Switzerland and Austria) at the Internet Archive
  - Part 2 (Central Italy and Rome) at the Internet Archive
  - Part 3 (Southern Italy and Sicily, with Excursions into the Liparia Islands, Malta, Sardinia, Tunis, and Corfu ) at the Internet Archive
- Northern Germany, as far as the Bavarian and Austrian frontiers (11th ed.), Leipzig: Karl Baedeker, 1893, OCLC 04838637.
- Switzerland, and the adjacent portions of Italy, Savoy and the Tyrol (15th ed.), Leipzig: Karl Baedeker, 1893, OCLC 09214667.

==== 1894 ====
- Belgium and Holland, Including the Grand-duchy of Luxembourg (11th ed.), Leipzig: Karl Baedeker, 1894, OCLC 00891524
- The Dominion of Canada, with Newfoundland and an excursion to Alaska, Leipzig: Karl Baedeker, 1894, ISBN 9780665000768, OCLC 04068007.
- Great Britain (3rd ed.), Leipzig: K. Baedeker, 1893, OCLC 04255484
- Greece (2nd ed.), Leipzig: Karl Baedeker, 1894, OCLC 02457238
- London and Its Environs (9th ed.), Leipzig: Karl Baedeker, 1894, OCLC 02134456
- Northern France, from Belgium and the English Channel to the Loire, excluding Paris and its Environs (2nd ed.), Leipzig: Karl Baedeker, 1889, OCLC 01596486
- Palestine and Syria (2nd ed.), Leipzig: Karl Baedeker, 1894, OCLC 01028236.
- Paris and its environs, with routes from London to Paris (11th ed.), Leipzig: Karl Baedeker, 1894, OCLC 02715142.

==== 1895 ====
- The Eastern Alps, Including the Bavarian Highlands, Tyrol, Salzburg, Upper and Lower Austria, Styria, Carinthia, and Carniola (8th ed.), Leipzig: Karl Baedeker, 1895, OCLC 01023668
- Egypt edited by K. Baedeker, Part First: Lower Egypt, with the Fayum and the Peninsula of Sinai, Leipsic: Karl Baedeker, 1895
- Norway, Sweden, and Denmark (6th ed.), Leipzig: Karl Baedeker, 1895, OCLC 02288731.
- South-eastern France, from the Loire to the Riviera and the Italian frontier, including Corsica (2nd ed.), Leipzig: Karl Baedeker, 1895, OCLC 02288761
- Southern Germany, including Wurtemberg and Bavaria (8th ed.), Leipzig: K. Baedeker, 1895, OCLC 15202284
- South-western France, from the Loire and the Rhone to the Spanish frontier (2nd ed.), Leipzig: K. Baedeker, 1895, OCLC 03764092
- Switzerland, and the adjacent portions of Italy, Savoy and the Tyrol (16th ed.), Leipzig: Karl Baedeker, 1895, OCLC 02195600.

==== 1896 ====
- Athens and its Immediate Environs, Leipzic: Karl Baedeker, 1896
- Austria, including Hungary, Transylvania, Dalmatia, and Bosnia (8th ed.), Leipzig: Karl Baedeker, 1896, OCLC 01834643
- Italy (12th ed.), Leipzig: Karl Baedeker, 1896–1903, OCLC 03675130.
  - Part 1 (Northern Italy, including Leghorn, Florence, Ravenna, and routes through Switzerland and Austria)
  - Part 2 (Central Italy and Rome) at the Internet Archive
  - Part 3 (Southern Italy and Sicily, with Excursions into the Liparia Islands, Malta, Sardinia, Tunis, and Corfu ) at the Internet Archive
- London and Its Environs (10th ed.), Leipzig: Karl Baedeker, 1896, OCLC 01664173
- Paris and its environs, with routes from London to Paris, and from Paris to the Rhine and Switzerland (12th ed.), Leipzig: Karl Baedeker, 1896, OCLC 03763994.
- The Rhine from Rotterdam to Constance (13th ed.), Leipzig: Karl Baedeker, 1896, OCLC 01957870

==== 1897 ====
- Belgium and Holland, Including the Grand-duchy of Luxembourg (12th ed.), Leipzig: Karl Baedeker, 1897, OCLC 02167054
- Great Britain (4th ed.), Leipzig: Karl Baedeker, 1897, OCLC 6430424, OL 23302162M
- Baedeker, Karl (1897), Northern Germany as far as the Bavarian and Austrian Frontiers: Handbook for Travellers (12th ed.), Leipzig: Karl Baedeker, LCCN 04001186, OCLC 3058615, OL 20436274M, Wikidata Q140795779
- Switzerland, and the adjacent portions of Italy, Savoy and the Tyrol (17th ed.), Leipzig: Karl Baedeker, 1897, OCLC 06105005.

==== 1898 ====
- Egypt (4th ed.), Leipzig: Karl Baedeker, 1898, OCLC 01329502.
- London and Its Environs (11th ed.), Leipzig: Karl Baedeker, 1898, OCLC 00407945
- Palestine and Syria (3rd ed.), Leipsig: Karl Baedeker, 1898
- Paris and its environs, with routes from London to Paris, and from Paris to the Rhine and Switzerland (13th ed.), Leipzig: Karl Baedeker, 1898, OCLC 01648732.
- Spain and Portugal, Leipzig: Karl Baedeker, 1898, OCLC 1410274

==== 1899 ====
- The Eastern Alps, including the Bavarian Highlands, Tyrol, Salzburg, Upper and Lower Austria, Styria, Carinthia, and Carniola (9th ed.), Leipzig: Karl Baedeker, 1899, OCLC 06291596
- Northern France, from Belgium and the English channel to the Loire, excluding Paris and its environs (3rd ed.), Leipzig: Karl Baedeker, 1899, OCLC 2229516, OL 24872324M
- Norway, Sweden, and Denmark (7th ed.), Leipzig: Karl Baedeker, 1899, OCLC 01029532.
- The United States, with an excursion into Mexico (2nd ed.), Leipzig: Karl Baedeker, 1899, OCLC 01520672
- Switzerland, and the adjacent portions of Italy, Savoy and the Tyrol (18th ed.), Leipzig: Karl Baedeker, 1899, OCLC 02286521.

=== 1900s ===
==== 1900 ====
- Austria, including Hungary, Transylvania, Dalmatia, and Bosnia (9th ed.), Leipzig: Karl Baedeker, 1900, OCLC 01703017
- The Dominion of Canada, with Newfoundland and an excursion to Alaska (2nd ed.), Leipzig: Karl Baedeker, 1900, OCLC 02847352.
- Italy (13th ed.), Leipzig: Karl Baedeker, 1900–1906, OCLC 02947512.
  - Part 1 (Northern Italy, including Leghorn, Florence, Ravenna, and routes through Switzerland and Austria) at the Internet Archive
  - Part 2 (Central Italy and Rome) at the Internet Archive
  - Part 3 (Southern Italy and Sicily, with Excursions into the Liparia Islands, Malta, Sardinia, Tunis, and Corfu ) at the Internet Archive
- Paris and its environs, with routes from London to Paris, and from Paris to the Rhine and Switzerland (14th ed.), Leipzig: Karl Baedeker, 1900, OCLC 02087243.
- The Rhine from Rotterdam to Constance (14th ed.), Leipzig: Karl Baedeker, 1900, OCLC 02170332

==== 1901 ====
- Belgium and Holland, Including the Grand-duchy of Luxembourg (13th ed.), Leipzig: Karl Baedeker, 1901, OCLC 01678866
- Great Britain (5th ed.), Leipzig: Karl Baedeker, 1901, OCLC 03439728
- Spain and Portugal (2nd ed.), Leipzig: Karl Baedeker, 1901, OCLC 01710943
- Switzerland, and the adjacent portions of Italy, Savoy and the Tyrol (19th ed.), Leipzig: Karl Baedeker, 1901, OCLC 14110158.

==== 1902 ====
- Egypt (5th ed.), Karl Baedeker, 1902, OCLC 1384290
- London and Its Environs (13th ed.), Leipzig: Karl Baedeker, 1902, OCLC 03455899
- La Russie: manuel du voyageur (in French) (3rd ed.). Leipzig: Karl Baedeker. 1902. OCLC 03455899.
- Southern France, Including Corsica (4th ed.), Karl Baedeker, 1902, OCLC 01820163, OL 20609463M
- Southern Germany (9th ed.), Leipzig: K. Baedeker, 1902, OCLC 01982789

==== 1903 ====
- Berlin and its environs, Leipzig: Karl Baedeker, 1903, OCLC 01677479
- The Eastern Alps, including the Bavarian Highlands, Tyrol, Salzburg, Upper and Lower Austria, Styria, Carinthia, and Carniola (10th ed.), Leipzig: Karl Baedeker, 1903, OCLC 03287240
- Italy (14th ed.), Leipzig: Karl Baedeker, 1903–1904, OCLC 04700247.
  - Part 1 (Northern Italy, including Leghorn, Florence, Ravenna, and routes through Switzerland and Austria)
  - Part 2 (Central Italy and Rome) at the Internet Archive
  - Part 3 (Southern Italy and Sicily, with Excursions into the Liparia Islands, Malta, Sardinia, Tunis, and Corfu ) at the Internet Archive
- Norway, Sweden, and Denmark (8th ed.), Leipzig: Karl Baedeker, 1903, OCLC 02113637, OL 16522424M
- Switzerland, and the adjacent portions of Italy, Savoy and the Tyrol (20th ed.), Leipzig: Karl Baedeker, 1903, OCLC 01738549.

==== 1904 ====
- Italy, from the Alps to Naples (15th ed.), Leipzig: Karl Baedeker, 1904, OCLC 00243469.
- Paris and its environs, with routes from London to Paris, and from Paris to the Rhine and Switzerland (15th ed.), Leipzig: Karl Baedeker, 1904, OCLC 18407132.
- The United States, with an excursion into Mexico (3rd ed.), Leipzig: Karl Baedeker, 1904, OCLC 00490822

==== 1905 ====
- Austria-Hungary, Including Dalmatia and Bosnia, Leipzig: Karl Baedeker, 1905, OCLC 344268 + Index
- Berlin and its environs (2nd ed.), Leipzig: Karl Baedeker, 1905, OCLC 02491108
- Belgium and Holland, Including the Grand-duchy of Luxembourg (14th ed.), Leipzig: Karl Baedeker, 1905, OCLC 06412622
- Greece (3rd ed.), Leipzig: Karl Baedeker, 1905, OCLC 02496016
- Northern France, from Belgium and the English channel to the Loire, excluding Paris and its environs (4th ed.), Leipzig: Karl Baedeker, 1905, OCLC 01820283
- Switzerland, and the adjacent portions of Italy, Savoy and the Tyrol (21st ed.), Leipzig: Karl Baedeker, 1905, OCLC 02491087.

==== 1906 ====
- Great Britain (6th ed.), Leipzig: Karl Baedeker, 1906, OCLC 00400535
- Palestine and Syria, with chief routes through Mesopotamia and Babylonia (4th ed.), Leipzig: Karl Baedeker, 1906, OCLC 00594020.
- The Rhine from Rotterdam to Constance (16th ed.), Leipzig: Karl Baedeker, 1906, OCLC 01224167

==== 1907 ====
- The Dominion of Canada, with Newfoundland and an excursion to Alaska (3rd ed.), Leipzig: Karl Baedeker, 1907, OCLC 03077397.
- The Eastern Alps, including the Bavarian Highlands, Tyrol, Salzburg, Upper and Lower Austria, Styria, Carinthia, and Carniola (11th ed.), Leipzig: Karl Baedeker, 1907, OCLC 02843469
- Paris and its environs, with routes from London to Paris, and from Paris to the Rhine and Switzerland (16th ed.), Leipzig: Karl Baedeker, 1907, OCLC 01648760.
- Southern Germany (10th ed.), Leipzig: K. Baedeker, 1907, OCLC 14004165
- Switzerland, and the adjacent portions of Italy, Savoy and the Tyrol (22nd ed.), Leipzig: Karl Baedeker, 1907, OCLC 05691169.

==== 1908 ====
- Berlin and its environs (3rd ed.), Leipzig: Karl Baedeker, 1908, OCLC 00575650
- Egypt and the Sudan (6th ed.), Karl Baedeker, 1908, OCLC 00491772
- London and Its Environs (15th ed.), Leipzig: Karl Baedeker, 1908, OCLC 01556987
- Spain and Portugal (3rd ed.), Leipzig: Karl Baedeker, 1908, OCLC 1581249 + index
- Southern Italy and Sicily, with excursions to Malta, Sardinia, Tunis and Corfu (15th ed.), Leipzig: Karl Baedeker, 1908

==== 1909 ====
- Central Italy and Rome (15th ed.), Leipzig: Karl Baedeker, 1909, OCLC 423237
- Greece (4th ed.), Leipzig: Karl Baedeker, 1909, OCLC 01648583, OL 24347510M
- Italy, from the Alps to Naples (2nd ed.), Leipzig: Karl Baedeker, OCLC 00400551
- Northern France, from Belgium and the English Channel to the Loire, excluding Paris and its environs (15th ed.), Leipzig, Karl Baedeker, 1909
- Norway, Sweden, and Denmark, with excursions to Iceland and Spitzbergen (9th ed.), Leipzig: Karl Baedeker, 1903, OCLC 02145706
- Switzerland, and the adjacent portions of Italy, Savoy and the Tyrol (23rd ed.), Leipzig: Karl Baedeker, 1909, OCLC 00378851.
- The United States, with Excursions to Mexico, Cuba, Porto Rico, and Alaska (4th ed.), Leipzig: K. Baedeker, 1909, OCLC 02338437, OL 14684345M + Index

=== 1910s ===
- Belgium and Holland, including the Grand-Duchy of Luxembourg (15th ed.), Leipzig: Karl Baedeker, 1910, OCLC 397759
- Great Britain (7th ed.), Leipzig: Karl Baedeker, 1910 + Index
- Baedeker, Karl (1910), Northern Germany as far as the Bavarian and Austrian Frontiers: Handbook for Travellers (15th rev. ed.), Leipzig: Karl Baedeker, LCCN e12001126, OCLC 2031122, OL 24871224M, Wikidata Q131175392
- Austria-Hungary (11th ed.). Leipzig: Karl Baedeker. 1911. + Index
- The Mediterranean: Seaports and Sea Routes, including Madeira, the Canary Islands, the Coast of Morocco, Algeria, and Tunisia, Leipzig: Karl Baedeker, 1911, OCLC 490068, OL 6536603M
- The Rhine, including the Black Forest & the Vosges, Leipzig: Karl Baedeker, 1911, OCLC 21888483 + Index
- Norway, Sweden, and Denmark, with excursions to Iceland and Spitzbergen (10th ed.), Leipzig: Karl Baedeker, 1912, hdl:2027/uva.x030531120
- Northern Italy: including Leghorn, Florence, Ravenna and Routes through France, Switzerland and Austria (14th ed.), Leipzig: Karl Baedeker, 1913 + index
- Paris and Environs (18th ed.), Leipzig: Karl Baedeker, 1913, OCLC 255000
- Egypt and the Sudan (7th ed.), Leipzig: Karl Baedeker, 1914, OL 14287670M
- Southern Germany (Wurtemberg and Bavaria) (12th ed.), Leipzig: Karl Baedeker, 1914, OCLC 2011248, OL 6569059M
- Russia with Teheran, Port Arthur, and Peking, Leipzig: Karl Baedeker, 1914, OCLC 1328163 – via HathiTrust + Index
- London and Its Environs (17th ed.), Leipzig: Karl Baedeker, 1915
- Berlin und Umgebung, 1910, Karl Baedeker

=== 1920s ===
- Switzerland, Together with Chamonix and the Italian Lakes (26th ed.), Leipzig: Karl Baedeker, 1922, OCLC 4248970
- Canada (4th ed.), Leipzig: Karl Baedeker, 1922
- Berlin and its Environs (6th ed.), Leipzig: Karl Baedeker, 1923
- London and its Environs (18th ed.), Leipzig: Karl Baedeker, 1923
- Paris and its Environs (19th ed.), Leipzig: Karl Baedeker, 1924
- Northern Germany (17th ed.), Leipzig: Karl Baedeker, 1925
- The Rhine – From the Dutch to the Alsatian Frontier (18th ed.), Leipzig: Karl Baedeker, 1926
- Tyrol and the Dolomites (13th ed.), Leipzig: Karl Baedeker, 1927
- Great Britain (8th ed.), Leipzig: Karl Baedeker, Leipzig, 1927
- Italy from the Alps to Naples (3rd ed.), Leipzig: Karl Baedeker, 1928
- Switzerland (27th ed.), Leipzig: Karl Baedeker, 1928
- Southern Germany (13th ed.), Leipzig: Karl Baedeker, 1929
- Austria, Together with Budapest, Prague, Karlsbad, Marienbad (12th ed.), Leipzig: Karl Baedeker, 1929
- Egypt and the Sudan (8th ed.), Leipzig: Karl Baedeker, 1929

=== 1930s ===
- Northern Italy (15th ed.), Leipzig: Karl Baedeker, 1930
- Rome and Central Italy (16th ed.), Leipzig: Karl Baedeker, 1930
- Southern Italy (17th ed.), Leipzig: Karl Baedeker, 1930
- London and its Environs (19th ed.), Leipzig: Karl Baedeker, 1930
- The Riviera. South-Eastern France and Corsica, the Italian Lakes and Lake of Geneva (1st ed.), Leipzig: Karl Baedeker, 1931
- Belgium and Luxemburg (16th ed.), Leipzig: Karl Baedeker, 1931
  - Note: the 15 editions before this were published as Belgium and Holland
- Paris and its Environs (20th ed.), Leipzig: Karl Baedeker, 1932
- Germany (Olympic Games) (1st ed.), Leipzig: Karl Baedeker, 1936
- Great Britain (9th ed.), Leipzig: Karl Baedeker, 1937
- Switzerland (28th ed.), Leipzig: Karl Baedeker, 1938
- Madeira, Canary Islands, Azores, Western Morocco (1st ed.), Leipzig: Karl Baedeker, 1939

=== 1940s ===
No English Baedekers published. This list otherwise contains several non English editions.

The list appears to avoid mentioning war years tourist guides about occupied territories which may have been published in the 1940s.

The first post-World War II old-style Baedekers in English were published in the 1950s by Karl Baedeker Verlag, Hamburg, after the firm was revived in 1948.

A guide to the General Government, the Polish land occupied by Germany, was published in 1943. Source: Marian Mark Drozdowski, The history of the Warsaw Ghetto in the Light of the Reports of Ludwig Fischer, Polin, Vol. 3, 1988, pp. 189–199, cited in T. Snyder, Blood Lands, Vintage, 2010, p. 145.

=== 1950s ===
- Munich and its Environs (1st ed.), Hamburg: Karl Baedeker, 1950
- London and its Environs (20th ed.), Hamburg: Karl Baedeker, 1951
- Northern Bavaria (1st ed.), Hamburg: Karl Baedeker, 1951
- Frankfurt and the Taunus (1st ed.), Hamburg: Karl Baedeker, 1951
- Frankfurt and the Taunus (2nd ed.), Hamburg: Karl Baedeker, 1953
- Southern Bavaria with Excursions to Innsbruck and Salzburg (1st ed.), Hamburg: Karl Baedeker, 1953
- London and its Environs (21st ed.), Hamburg: Karl Baedeker, 1955
- Munich and its Environs (2nd ed.), Hamburg: Karl Baedeker, 1956

=== 1960s ===
- Frankfurt and the Taunus (3rd ed.), Freiburg: Karl Baedeker, 1960
- Cologne and Bonn with Environs (1st ed.), Freiburg: Karl Baedeker, 1961
- Tyrol and Salzburg (1st ed.), Freiburg: Karl Baedeker, 1961
- Berlin (7th ed.), Freiburg: Karl Baedeker, 1965
- Great Britain, Vol. I – Southern England, East Anglia (10th ed.), Freiburg: Karl Baedeker, 1966
- Great Britain, Vol. II – Central England, Wales (10th ed.), Freiburg: Karl Baedeker, 1968

=== 1970s ===
- Great Britain, Vol. III – Northern England (10th ed.), Freiburg: Karl Baedeker, 1970
- Berlin (Abridged ed.), Freiburg: Karl Baedeker, 1971–1975

== List of Baedeker guides by geographic coverage ==
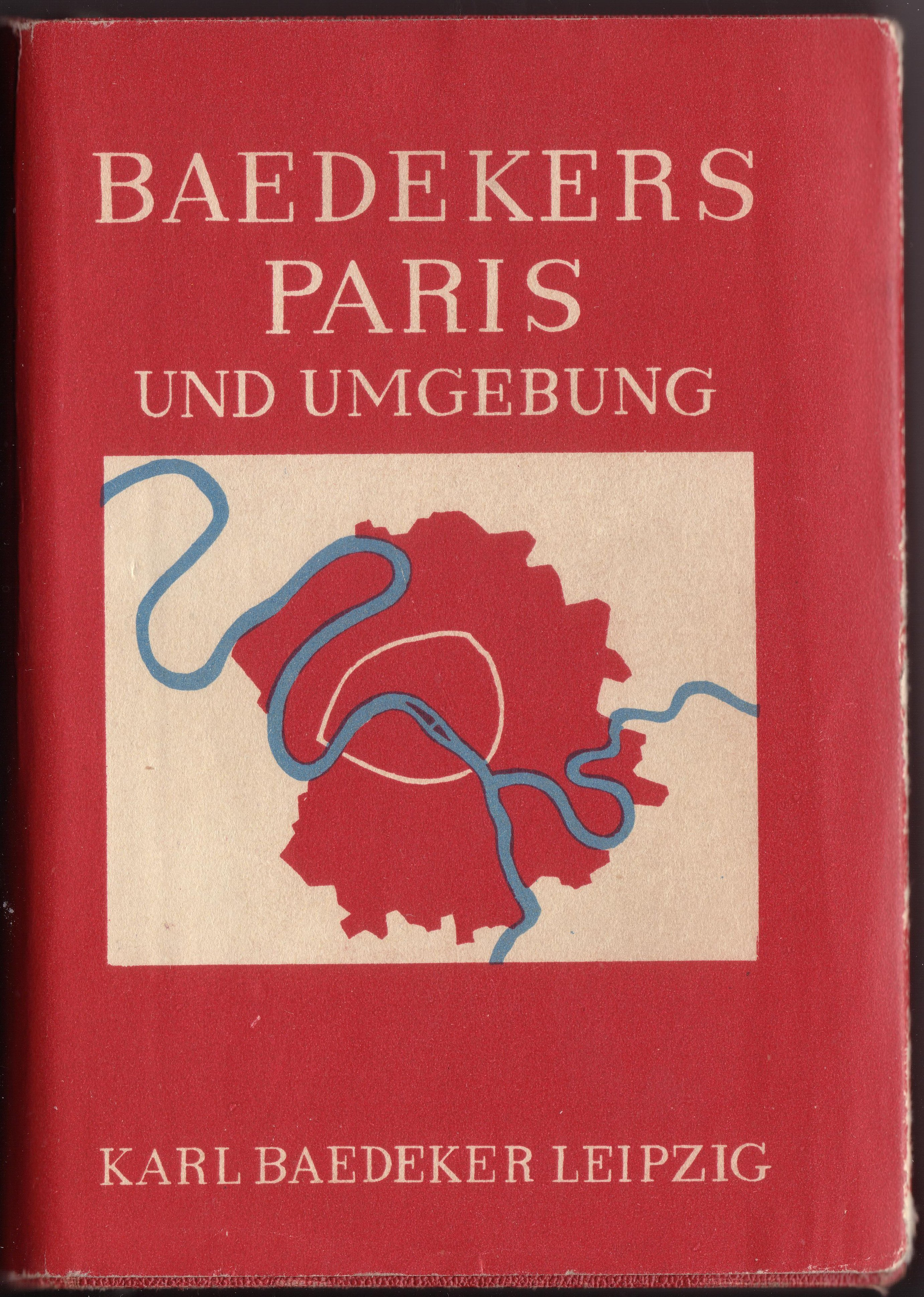
Baedeker's Paris, 1931

With a few exceptions, classic Baedekers were published in German, English and French. These lists enlist the English Baedekers only. Where geographical areas were not covered in English editions this is indicated.

=== Alaska ===
See Canada and United States

Alaska became the 49th state of the United States on January 3, 1959.

=== Albania ===
- In German only: Dalmatia, Western Yugoslavia, Albania viz. Dalmatien und die Adria, Westliches Südslawien, Istrien, Budapest, Albanien, Korfu. Karl Baedeker, Leipzig, 1929.

=== Algeria ===
See Mediterranean

=== Andorra ===
See Spain

=== Austria ===
- Southern Germany and Austria (2nd ed.), Coblenz: Karl Baedeker, 1871, OCLC 4090237
- Southern Germany and Austria, including the eastern Alps (3rd ed.), Coblenz: Karl Baedeker, 1873, OCLC 16840876
- Southern Germany and Austria, including Hungary and Transylvania (4th ed.), Leipzig: Karl Baedeker, 1880, OCLC 03764032
- Southern Germany and Austria, including the eastern Alps (5th ed.), Coblenz: Karl Baedeker, 1883, OCLC 06565439
- Southern Germany and Austria, including Hungary and Transylvania (6th ed.), Leipzig: Karl Baedeker, 1887, OCLC 02008565
- Southern Germany and Austria, including Hungary, Dalmatia and Bosnia (7th ed.), Leipzig: Karl Baedeker, 1891, OCLC 01028235.
- Northern Germany, as far as the Bavarian and Austrian frontiers (11th ed.), Leipzig: Karl Baedeker, 1893, OCLC 04838637.
- The Eastern Alps, Including the Bavarian Highlands, Tyrol, Salzburg, Upper and Lower Austria, Styria, Carinthia, and Carniola (8th ed.), Leipzig: Karl Baedeker, 1895, OCLC 01023668
- Austria, including Hungary, Transylvania, Dalmatia, and Bosnia (8th ed.), Leipzig: Karl Baedeker, 1896, OCLC 01834643
- Northern Germany, as far as the Bavarian and Austrian frontiers (12th ed.), Leipzig: Karl Baedeker, 1897, OCLC 03058615.
- The Eastern Alps, including the Bavarian Highlands, Tyrol, Salzburg, Upper and Lower Austria, Styria, Carinthia, and Carniola (9th ed.), Leipzig: Karl Baedeker, 1899, OCLC 06291596
- Austria, including Hungary, Transylvania, Dalmatia, and Bosnia (9th ed.), Leipzig: Karl Baedeker, 1900, OCLC 01703017
- The Eastern Alps, including the Bavarian Highlands, Tyrol, Salzburg, Upper and Lower Austria, Styria, Carinthia, and Carniola (10th ed.), Leipzig: Karl Baedeker, 1903, OCLC 03287240
- Austria-Hungary, Including Dalmatia and Bosnia, Leipzig: Karl Baedeker, 1905, OCLC 344268 + Index
- The Eastern Alps, including the Bavarian Highlands, Tyrol, Salzburg, Upper and Lower Austria, Styria, Carinthia, and Carniola (11th ed.), Leipzig: Karl Baedeker, 1907, OCLC 02843469 + index
- Northern Germany as far as the Bavarian and Austrian Frontiers (15th ed.), Leipzig: Karl Baedeker, 1910, OCLC 78390379
- Austria-Hungary (11th ed.). Leipzig: Karl Baedeker. 1911 – via HathiTrust. + Index
- Austria, Together with Budapest, Prague, Karlsbad, Marienbad (12th ed.), Leipzig: Karl Baedeker, 1929

=== Belgium ===
- Belgium and Holland, Coblenz: Karl Baedeker, 1869, OCLC 18168820.
- Belgium and Holland (2nd ed.), Coblenz: Karl Baedeker, 1871, OCLC 10782543.
- Belgium and Holland (4th ed.), Coblenz: Karl Baedeker, 1875, OCLC 01971963.
- Belgium and Holland (5th ed.), Leipzig: Karl Baedeker, 1878, OCLC 10865696.
- Belgium and Holland (6th ed.), Leipzig: Karl Baedeker, 1881, OCLC 01648545
- Belgium and Holland (7th ed.), Leipzig: Karl Baedeker, 1884, OCLC 19022249
- Belgium and Holland (8th ed.), Leipzig: Karl Baedeker, 1885, OCLC 02343524
- Belgium and Holland (9th ed.), Leipzig: Karl Baedeker, 1888, OCLC 05970948
- Belgium and Holland (10th ed.), Leipzig: Karl Baedeker, 1891, OCLC 5624932, OL 23280595M
- Belgium and Holland, Including the Grand-duchy of Luxembourg (11th ed.), Leipzig: Karl Baedeker, 1894, OCLC 00891524
- Belgium and Holland, Including the Grand-duchy of Luxembourg (12th ed.), Leipzig: Karl Baedeker, 1897, OCLC 02167054
- Belgium and Holland, Including the Grand-duchy of Luxembourg (13th ed.), Leipzig: Karl Baedeker, 1901, OCLC 01678866
- Belgium and Holland, Including the Grand-duchy of Luxembourg (14th ed.), Leipzig: Karl Baedeker, 1905, OCLC 06412622
- Belgium and Holland, including the Grand-Duchy of Luxembourg (15th ed.), Leipzig: Karl Baedeker, 1910, OCLC 397759 – via Internet Archive + via HathiTrust

=== Bosnia and Herzegovina ===
See Austria

=== Burma ===
See India (Indien).

=== Canada ===
- The Dominion of Canada, with Newfoundland and an excursion to Alaska, Leipzig: Karl Baedeker, 1894, ISBN 9780665000768, OCLC 04068007.
- The Dominion of Canada, with Newfoundland and an excursion to Alaska (2nd ed.), Leipzig: Karl Baedeker, 1900, OCLC 02847352.
- The Dominion of Canada, with Newfoundland and an excursion to Alaska (3rd ed.), Leipzig: Karl Baedeker, 1907, OCLC 03077397.
- Canada (4th ed.), Leipzig: Karl Baedeker, 1922

=== Ceylon ===
See India (Indien).

=== China ===
See Russia for Peking.

=== Croatia ===
- Austria-Hungary including Dalmatia, Bosnia, Bucharest, Belgrade, and Montenegro (10th ed. 1905) and (11th ed. 1911), Karl Baedeker, Leipzig.

=== Cuba ===
See United States

=== Czechoslovakia ===
See Austria

=== Cyprus ===
See Turkey and Palestine

=== Denmark ===
See Norway

=== Egypt ===
- Egypt, Leipzig: Karl Baedeker, 1878–1892, OCLC 02031064.
  - Part 1 (Lower Egypt, with the Fayum and the Peninsula of Sinai) at the Internet Archive
- Egypt (2nd ed.), Leipzig: Karl Baedeker, 1885, OCLC 08608955
  - Part 1 (Lower Egypt, with the Fayum and the peninsula of Sinai) at the Internet Archive
  - Part 2 (Upper Egypt, with Nubia, as far as the Second Cataract and the Western Oases) at the Internet Archive
- Egypt (4th ed.), Leipzig: Karl Baedeker, 1898, OCLC 01329502.
- Egypt (5th ed.), Karl Baedeker, 1902, OCLC 1384290
- Egypt and the Sudan (6th ed.), Karl Baedeker, 1908, OCLC 00491772
- Egypt and the Sudan (7th ed.), Leipzig: Karl Baedeker, 1914, OL 14287670M + Index
- Egypt and the Sudan (8th ed.), Leipzig: Karl Baedeker, 1929

=== Estonia ===
See Russia.

=== Finland ===
In German title only; Schweden, Finnland und die Hauptreisewege durch Dänemark, Karl Baedeker, Leipzig, 1929

See also Russia

=== France ===
- Paris and northern France, Coblenz: Karl Baedeker, 1867, OCLC 22685197
- Paris and Northern France (3rd ed.), Coblenz: Karl Baedeker, 1872, OCLC 12996798.
- Northern France, from Belgium and the English Channel to the Loire, excluding Paris and its Environs, Leipzig: Karl Baedeker, 1889, OCLC 02711578
- Southern France, from the Loire to the Spanish and Italian frontiers, including Corsica, Leipzig: Karl Baedeker, 1891, OCLC 03030499
- Northern France, from Belgium and the English Channel to the Loire, excluding Paris and its Environs (2nd ed.), Leipzig: Karl Baedeker, 1889, OCLC 01596486
- South-eastern France, from the Loire to the Riviera and the Italian frontier, including Corsica (2nd ed.), Leipzig: Karl Baedeker, 1895, OCLC 02288761
- South-western France, from the Loire and the Rhone to the Spanish frontier (2nd ed.), Leipzig: K. Baedeker, 1895, OCLC 03764092
- Northern France, from Belgium and the English channel to the Loire, excluding Paris and its environs (3rd ed.), Leipzig: Karl Baedeker, 1899, OCLC 2229516, OL 24872324M
- Southern France, Including Corsica (4th ed.), Karl Baedeker, 1902, OCLC 01820163, OL 20609463M + Index
- Northern France, from Belgium and the English channel to the Loire, excluding Paris and its environs (4th ed.), Leipzig: Karl Baedeker, 1905, OCLC 01820283 + via HathiTrust
- Paris and Environs, Leipzig: Karl Baedeker, 1913
- Southern France (6th ed.), Karl Baedeker, 1914 – via HathiTrust + via Internet Archive
- The Riviera. South-Eastern France and Corsica, the Italian Lakes and Lake of Geneva (1st ed.), Leipzig: Karl Baedeker, 1931

=== Germany ===
1870s-1880s

- Southern Germany and Austria (2nd ed.), Coblenz: Karl Baedeker, 1871, OCLC 4090237, OL 20619468M
- Northern Germany (5th ed.), Coblenz: Karl Baedeker, 1873, OCLC 5947482 + index
- The Rhine, from Rotterdam to Constance (5th ed.), Coblenz: Karl Baedeker, 1873, OCLC 02027251
- Southern Germany and Austria, including the eastern Alps (3rd ed.), Coblenz: Karl Baedeker, 1873, OCLC 16840876
- Northern Germany (6th ed.), Leipzig: Karl Baedeker, 1877, OCLC 03018979.
- The Rhine, from Rotterdam to Constance (6th ed.), Leipzig: Karl Baedeker, 1878, OCLC 10858869.
- Southern Germany and Austria, including Hungary and Transylvania (4th ed.), Leipzig: Karl Baedeker, 1880, OCLC 03764032
- Northern Germany (7th ed.), Leipzig: Karl Baedeker, 1881, OCLC 08942406.
- The Rhine from Rotterdam to Constance (8th ed.), Leipzig: Karl Baedeker, 1882, OCLC 7416969
- Southern Germany and Austria, including the eastern Alps (5th ed.), Coblenz: Karl Baedeker, 1883, OCLC 06565439
- Northern Germany (8th ed.), Leipzig: Karl Baedeker, 1884, OCLC 01637082.
- Northern Germany (9th ed.), Leipzig: Karl Baedeker, 1886, OCLC 06220985.
- The Rhine from Rotterdam to Constance (10th ed.), Leipzig: Karl Baedeker, 1886, OCLC 06302332
- Southern Germany and Austria, including Hungary and Transylvania (6th ed.), Leipzig: Karl Baedeker, 1887, OCLC 02008565
- The Rhine from Rotterdam to Constance (11th ed.), Leipzig: Karl Baedeker, 1889, OCLC 04250198

1890s-1900s

- Northern Germany (10th ed.), Leipzig: Karl Baedeker, 1890, OCLC 04509827.
- Southern Germany and Austria, including Hungary, Dalmatia and Bosnia (7th ed.), Leipzig: Karl Baedeker, 1891, OCLC 01028235.
- The Rhine from Rotterdam to Constance (12th ed.), Leipzig: Karl Baedeker, 1892, OCLC 06459504
- Northern Germany, as far as the Bavarian and Austrian frontiers (11th ed.), Leipzig: Karl Baedeker, 1893, OCLC 04838637.
- Southern Germany, including Wurtemberg and Bavaria (8th ed.), Leipzig: K. Baedeker, 1895, OCLC 15202284
- The Rhine from Rotterdam to Constance (13th ed.), Leipzig: Karl Baedeker, 1896, OCLC 01957870
- Northern Germany, as far as the Bavarian and Austrian frontiers (12th ed.), Leipzig: Karl Baedeker, 1897, OCLC 03058615.
- The Rhine from Rotterdam to Constance (14th ed.), Leipzig: Karl Baedeker, 1900, OCLC 02170332
- Southern Germany (9th ed.), Leipzig: K. Baedeker, 1902, OCLC 01982789
- The Rhine from Rotterdam to Constance (16th ed.), Leipzig: Karl Baedeker, 1906, OCLC 01224167
- Southern Germany (10th ed.), Leipzig: K. Baedeker, 1907, OCLC 14004165

1910s-1920s

- Northern Germany as far as the Bavarian and Austrian Frontiers (15th ed.), Leipzig: Karl Baedeker, 1910, OCLC 78390379 – via HathiTrust + index
- Berlin und Umgebung, 1910, Karl Baedeker
- The Rhine, including the Black Forest & the Vosges, Leipzig: Karl Baedeker, 1911, OCLC 21888483 – via HathiTrust + Index
- Southern Germany (Wurtemberg and Bavaria) (12th ed.), Leipzig: Karl Baedeker, 1914, OCLC 2011248, OL 6569059M + Index
- Northern Germany (17th ed.), Leipzig: Karl Baedeker, 1925
- The Rhine - From the Dutch to the Alsatian Frontier (18th ed.), Leipzig: Karl Baedeker, 1926
- Southern Germany (13th ed.), Leipzig: Karl Baedeker, 1929

1930s-1950s

- Germany (Olympic Games) (1st ed.), Leipzig: Karl Baedeker, 1936
- Munich and its Environs (1st ed.), Hamburg: Karl Baedeker, 1950
- Northern Bavaria (1st ed.), Hamburg: Karl Baedeker, 1951
- Frankfurt and the Taunus (1st ed.), Hamburg: Karl Baedeker, 1951
- Frankfurt and the Taunus (2nd ed.), Hamburg: Karl Baedeker, 1953
- Southern Bavaria with Excursions to Innsbruck and Salzburg (1st ed.), Hamburg: Karl Baedeker, 1953
- Munich and its Environs (2nd ed.), Hamburg: Karl Baedeker, 1956

=== Gibraltar ===
See Spain

=== Great Britain ===
- London and Its Environs (6th ed.), Leipzig: Karl Baedeker, 1887, OL 20608555M
- London and Its Environs (7th ed.), Leipzig: Karl Baedeker, 1889, OCLC 04609447
- Great Britain (2nd ed.), Leipzig: K. Baedeker, 1890, OCLC 04111991
- London and Its Environs (8th ed.), Leipzig: Karl Baedeker, 1892, OCLC 00406445
- Great Britain (3rd ed.), Leipzig: K. Baedeker, 1893, OCLC 04255484
- London and Its Environs (9th ed.), Leipzig: Karl Baedeker, 1894, OCLC 02134456
- London and Its Environs (10th ed.), Leipzig: Karl Baedeker, 1896, OCLC 01664173
- Great Britain (4th ed.), Leipzig: Karl Baedeker, 1897, OCLC 6430424, OL 23302162M
- London and Its Environs (11th ed.), Leipzig: Karl Baedeker, 1898, OCLC 00407945
- Great Britain (5th ed.), Leipzig: Karl Baedeker, 1901, OCLC 03439728
- London and Its Environs (13th ed.), Leipzig: Karl Baedeker, 1902, OCLC 03455899
- Great Britain (6th ed.), Leipzig: Karl Baedeker, 1906, OCLC 00400535
- London and Its Environs (15th ed.), Leipzig: Karl Baedeker, 1908, OCLC 01556987
- Great Britain (7th ed.), Leipzig: Karl Baedeker, 1910 + Index
- London and Its Environs (16th ed.), Leipsig: Karl Baedeker, 1911, OCLC 1556996, OL 20539867M
- London and Its Environs (17th ed.), Leipzig: Karl Baedeker, 1915 + index
- Great Britain (8th ed.), Leipzig: Karl Baedeker, Leipzig, 1927
- Great Britain (9th ed.), Leipzig: Karl Baedeker, 1937
- Great Britain, Vol. I – Southern England, East Anglia (10th ed.), Freiburg: Karl Baedeker, 1966
- Great Britain, Vol. II – Central England, Wales (10th ed.), Freiburg: Karl Baedeker, 1968
- Great Britain, Vol III – Northern England (10th ed.), Freiburg: Karl Baedeker, 1970

=== Greece ===
- Greece, Leipzig: Karl Baedeker, 1889, OCLC 03757021
- Greece (2nd ed.), Leipzig: Karl Baedeker, 1894, OCLC 02457238
- Athens and its Immediate Environs, Leipzic: Karl Baedeker, 1896
- Greece (3rd ed.), Leipzig: Karl Baedeker, 1905, OCLC 02496016
- Greece (4th ed.), Leipzig: Karl Baedeker, 1909, OCLC 01648583, OL 24347510M

=== Hungary ===
See Austria

=== Iceland ===
See Norway

=== India ===
In German only: Indien: Handbuch für Reisende (in German). Leipzig: Karl Baedeker. 1914 – via Google Books. (including Ceylon, Burma, Siam, parts of Malaya, Java; 1st ed.).

In 2013, Michael Wild, the Baedeker historian (see Karl Baedeker), published his translation of the 1914 Indien edition into English.

=== Indonesia ===
See India (Indien) for Java.

=== Iran ===
See Russia for Teheran.

=== Iraq ===
See Palestine for Babylonia.

=== Ireland ===
Ireland appeared only in the German editions of Great Britain viz. Grossbritannien (4th and last ed.), Karl Baedeker, Leipzig, 1906.

=== Isle of Man ===
See Great Britain, in particular:

- Great Britain (7th ed.), Leipzig: Karl Baedeker, 1910
- Great Britain (8th ed.), Leipzig: Karl Baedeker, Leipzig, 1927
- Great Britain (9th ed.), Leipzig: Karl Baedeker, 1937

=== Italy ===
- Italy, Coblenz: Karl Baedeker, 1867–1868, OCLC 03122521
  - Part 1 (Northern Italy, as far as Leghorn, Florence, and Ancona, and the Island of Corsica) at the Internet Archive
  - Part 2 (Central Italy and Rome) at the Internet Archive
  - Part 3 (Southern Italy, Sicily, the Lipari Islands) at the Internet Archive
- Italy (2nd ed.), Coblenz: Karl Baedeker, 1869–1870, OCLC 01637141.
  - Part 1 (Northern Italy and Corsica) at the Internet Archive
  - Part 2 (Central Italy and Rome)
  - Part 3 (Southern Italy, Sicily, and excursions to the Lipari Islands, Tunis, Sardinia, Malta, and Athens) at the Internet Archive (or Part 3 (Southern Italy and Sicily) at the Internet Archive)
- Italy (3rd ed.), Coblenz: Karl Baedeker, 1872–1874, OCLC 00610890.
  - Part 1 (Northern Italy, including Leghorn, Florence, and Ancona, and the Island of Corsica) at the Internet Archive
  - Part 2 (Central Italy and Rome) at the Internet Archive
  - Part 3 (Southern Italy and Sicily)
- Italy (4th ed.), Coblenz: Karl Baedeker, 1873–1877, OCLC 31899009.
  - Part 2 (Central Italy and Rome) at the Internet Archive
  - Part 3 (Southern Italy and Sicily) at the Internet Archive
- Italy (5th ed.), Coblenz: Karl Baedeker, 1875–1879, OCLC 31899008.
  - Part 2 (Central Italy and Rome) at the Internet Archive
  - Part 3 (Southern Italy and Sicily) at the Internet Archive
- Italy (6th ed.), Coblenz: Karl Baedeker, 1876–1879, OCLC 01648606.
  - Part 2 (Central Italy and Rome) at the Internet Archive
  - Part 3 (Southern Italy and Sicily) at the Internet Archive
- Italy (7th ed.), Leipzig: Karl Baedeker, 1880–1881, OCLC 12348490.
  - Part 2 (Central Italy and Rome) at the Internet Archive
  - Part 3 (Southern Italy and Sicily, with Excursions into the Liparia Islands, Malta, Sardinia, Tunis, and Corfu ) at the Internet Archive
- Italy (8th ed.), Leipzig: Karl Baedeker, 1883–1889, OCLC 10865626.
  - Part 1 (Northern Italy, including Leghorn, Florence, Ravenna, The Island of Corsica, and Routes Through France, Switzerland, and Austria) at the Internet Archive
  - Part 2 (Central Italy and Rome) at the Internet Archive
  - Part 3 (Southern Italy and Sicily, with Excursions into the Liparia Islands, Malta, Sardinia, Tunis, and Corfu )
- Italy (9th ed.), Leipzig: Karl Baedeker, 1886–1892, OCLC 10866352.
  - Part 2 (Central Italy and Rome) at the Internet Archive
  - Part 3 (Southern Italy and Sicily, with Excursions into the Liparia Islands, Malta, Sardinia, Tunis, and Corfu ) at the Internet Archive
- Italy (10th ed.), Leipzig: Karl Baedeker, 1890–1895, OCLC 17417033.
  - Part 1 (Northern Italy, including Leghorn, Florence, Ravenna, The Island of Corsica, and Routes Through France, Switzerland, and Austria) at the Internet Archive
  - Part 2 (Central Italy and Rome) at the Internet Archive
  - Part 3 (Southern Italy and Sicily, with Excursions into the Liparia Islands, Malta, Sardinia, Tunis, and Corfu ) at the Internet Archive
- Italy (11th ed.), Leipzig: Karl Baedeker, 1893–1899, OCLC 10866333.
  - Part 2 (Central Italy and Rome) at the Internet Archive
  - Part 3 (Southern Italy and Sicily, with Excursions into the Liparia Islands, Malta, Sardinia, Tunis, and Corfu ) at the Internet Archive
- Italy (12th ed.), Leipzig: Karl Baedeker, 1896–1903, OCLC 03675130.
  - Part 2 (Central Italy and Rome) at the Internet Archive
  - Part 3 (Southern Italy and Sicily, with Excursions into the Liparia Islands, Malta, Sardinia, Tunis, and Corfu ) at the Internet Archive
- Italy (13th ed.), Leipzig: Karl Baedeker, 1900–1906, OCLC 02947512.
  - Part 2 (Central Italy and Rome) at the Internet Archive
  - Part 3 (Southern Italy and Sicily, with Excursions into the Liparia Islands, Malta, Sardinia, Tunis, and Corfu ) at the Internet Archive
- Italy (14th ed.), Leipzig: Karl Baedeker, 1903–1904, OCLC 04700247.
  - Part 2 (Central Italy and Rome) at the Internet Archive
  - Part 3 (Southern Italy and Sicily, with Excursions into the Liparia Islands, Malta, Sardinia, Tunis, and Corfu ) at the Internet Archive
- Italy, from the Alps to Naples (15th ed.), Leipzig: Karl Baedeker, 1904, OCLC 00243469.
- Central Italy and Rome (15th ed.), Leipzig: Karl Baedeker, 1909, OCLC 423237 (+ Index)
- Italy, from the Alps to Naples (2nd ed.), Leipzig: Karl Baedeker, OCLC 00400551
- Southern Italy and Sicily, with excursions to Malta, Sardinia, Tunis and Corfu (15th ed.), Leipzig: Karl Baedeker, 1908
- Southern Italy and Sicily (16th ed.), Leipzig: Karl Baedeker, 1912 (+ via HathiTrust)
- Northern Italy (14th ed.), Leipzig: Karl Baedeker, 1913 (+ via HathiTrust; Index)
- Italy from the Alps to Naples (3rd ed.), Leipzig: Karl Baedeker, 1928
- Northern Italy (15th ed.), Leipzig: Karl Baedeker, 1930
- Rome and Central Italy (16th ed.), Leipzig: Karl Baedeker, 1930
- Southern Italy (17th ed.), Leipzig: Karl Baedeker, 1930

=== Jordan ===
See Palestine for Petra.

=== Latvia ===
See Russia.

=== Lebanon ===
See Palestine

=== Libya ===
See Italy (Southern) and Palestine

=== Liechtenstein ===
- Tyrol and the Dolomites (13th ed.), Leipzig, Karl Baedeker, 1927
- Switzerland (28th ed.), Leipzig, Karl Baedeker, 1938
- Only passing references to Vaduz in most of the other Switzerland editions.

=== Lithuania ===
See Russia.

=== Luxembourg ===
See Belgium

=== Madeira ===
- Madeira, Kanarische Inseln, Azoren, Westküste von Marokko (1st ed.), Leipzig: Karl Baedeker, 1934 (only German edition).
- Madeira, Canary Islands, Azores, Western Morocco (1st ed.), Leipzig: Karl Baedeker, 1939 (only English edition).

=== Malaya ===
See India (Indien).

=== Malta ===
See Italy (Southern)

=== Mediterranean ===
- The Mediterranean: Seaports and Searoutes, with Madeira, the Canary Islands, and the coasts of Morocco, Algeria and Tunisia. Leipzig: Baedeker. 1911. + index

=== Mexico ===
See United States

=== Monaco ===
See France (Southern France editions)

=== Montenegro ===
- Austria-Hungary including Dalmatia, Bosnia, Bucharest, Belgrade, and Montenegro (10th ed. 1905) and (11th ed. 1911), Karl Baedeker, Leipzig.

=== Morocco ===
See Mediterranean

=== Netherlands ===
See Belgium

=== Norway ===
- Norway and Sweden, Leipzig: Karl Baedeker, 1879, OCLC 13866645
- Norway and Sweden (2nd ed.), Leipzig: Karl Baedeker, 1882, OCLC 08534519
- Norway and Sweden (3rd ed.), Leipzig: Karl Baedeker, 1885, OCLC 10288659
- Norway and Sweden (4th ed.), Leipzig: Karl Baedeker, 1889, OCLC 02383830
- Norway and Sweden (5th ed.), Leipzig: Karl Baedeker, 1892, OCLC 09701999
- Norway, Sweden, and Denmark (6th ed.), Leipzig: Karl Baedeker, 1895, OCLC 02288731.
- Norway, Sweden, and Denmark (7th ed.), Leipzig: Karl Baedeker, 1899, OCLC 01029532.
- Norway, Sweden, and Denmark (8th ed.), Leipzig: Karl Baedeker, 1903, OCLC 02113637, OL 16522424M
- Norway, Sweden, and Denmark, with excursions to Iceland and Spitzbergen (9th ed.), Leipzig: Karl Baedeker, 1909, OCLC 02145706
- Norway, Sweden, and Denmark, Leipzig: Karl Baedeker, 1912 + Index

=== Palestine ===
- Palestine and Syria, Leipzig: Karl Baedeker, 1876, OCLC 02950227.
- Palestine and Syria (2nd ed.), Leipzig: Karl Baedeker, 1894, OCLC 01028236.
- Palestine and Syria (3rd ed.), Leipsig: Karl Baedeker, 1898
- Palestine and Syria, with chief routes through Mesopotamia and Babylonia (4th ed.), Leipzig: Karl Baedeker, 1906, OCLC 00594020.
- Palestine and Syria (5th ed.), Leipsig: Karl Baedeker, 1912 (Index)

=== Poland ===
See Russia and Germany

=== Portugal ===
See Spain

=== Romania ===
- Austria-Hungary including Dalmatia, Bosnia, Bucharest, Belgrade, and Montenegro (10th ed. 1905) and (11th ed. 1911), Karl Baedeker, Leipzig

=== Russia ===
- La Russie: manuel du voyageur (in French) (3rd ed.). Leipsig: Karl Baedeker. 1902.
- Russia, with Teheran, Port Arthur, and Peking, Leipzig: Karl Baedeker, 1914, OCLC 1328163. (Index).

=== San Marino ===
See Italy *Rome and Central Italy.

=== Serbia ===
See Yugoslavia

=== Siam (Thailand) ===
See India (Indien).

=== Slovenia ===
See Croatia

=== Spain ===
- Spain and Portugal, Leipzig: Karl Baedeker, 1898, OCLC 1410274
- Spain and Portugal (2nd ed.), Leipzig: Karl Baedeker, 1901, OCLC 01710943
- Spain and Portugal (3rd ed.), Leipzig: Karl Baedeker, 1908, OCLC 1581249 – via Internet Archive + index
- Spain and Portugal (4th ed.), Leipzig: Karl Baedeker, 1913 – via HathiTrust + index

=== Sudan ===
See Egypt

=== Sweden ===
See Norway

=== Switzerland ===
- Switzerland: with the Neighboring Lakes of Northern Italy, Savoy, and the Adjacent Districts of Piedmont, Lombardy and the Tyrol, Coblenz: Karl Baedeker, 1863, OCLC 03054781
- Switzerland: with the Neighboring Lakes of Northern Italy, Savoy, and the Adjacent Districts of Piedmont, Lombardy and the Tyrol (4th rev. and augm. ed.), Coblenz: Karl Baedeker, 1867, OCLC 05279135
- Switzerland, and the adjacent portions of Italy, Savoy, and the Tyrol (5th ed.), Coblenz: Karl Baedeker, 1872, OCLC 09941009.
- Switzerland, and the adjacent portions of Italy, Savoy, and the Tyrol (6th ed.), Coblenz: Karl Baedeker, 1873, OCLC 05845210.
- Switzerland, and the adjacent portions of Italy, Savoy and the Tyrol (7th ed.), Leipzig: Karl Baedeker, 1877, OCLC 09941114.
- Switzerland, and the adjacent portions of Italy, Savoy and the Tyrol (8th ed.), Leipzig: Karl Baedeker, 1879, OCLC 03054814.
- Switzerland, and the adjacent portions of Italy, Savoy and the Tyrol (9th ed.), Leipzig: Karl Baedeker, 1881, OCLC 04038453.
- Switzerland, and the adjacent portions of Italy, Savoy and the Tyrol (11th ed.), Leipzig: Karl Baedeker, 1885, OCLC 17556777.
- Switzerland, and the adjacent portions of Italy, Savoy and the Tyrol (12th ed.), Leipzig: Karl Baedeker, 1887, OCLC 06172453.
- Switzerland, and the adjacent portions of Italy, Savoy and the Tyrol (13th ed.), Leipzig: Karl Baedeker, 1889, OCLC 02363495.
- Switzerland, and the adjacent portions of Italy, Savoy and the Tyrol (14th ed.), Leipzig: Karl Baedeker, 1891, OCLC 01027094.
- Switzerland, and the adjacent portions of Italy, Savoy and the Tyrol (15th ed.), Leipzig: Karl Baedeker, 1893, OCLC 09214667.
- Switzerland, and the adjacent portions of Italy, Savoy and the Tyrol (16th ed.), Leipzig: Karl Baedeker, 1895, OCLC 02195600.
- Switzerland, and the adjacent portions of Italy, Savoy and the Tyrol (17th ed.), Leipzig: Karl Baedeker, 1897, OCLC 06105005.
- Switzerland, and the adjacent portions of Italy, Savoy and the Tyrol (18th ed.), Leipzig: Karl Baedeker, 1899, OCLC 02286521.
- Switzerland, and the adjacent portions of Italy, Savoy and the Tyrol (19th ed.), Leipzig: Karl Baedeker, 1901, OCLC 14110158.
- Switzerland, and the adjacent portions of Italy, Savoy and the Tyrol (20th ed.), Leipzig: Karl Baedeker, 1903, OCLC 01738549.
- Switzerland, and the adjacent portions of Italy, Savoy and the Tyrol (21st ed.), Leipzig: Karl Baedeker, 1905, OCLC 02491087.
- Switzerland, and the adjacent portions of Italy, Savoy and the Tyrol (22nd ed.), Leipzig: Karl Baedeker, 1907, OCLC 05691169.
- Switzerland, and the adjacent portions of Italy, Savoy and the Tyrol (23rd ed.), Leipzig: Karl Baedeker, 1909, OCLC 00378851.
- Northern Italy: including Leghorn, Florence, Ravenna and Routes through France, Switzerland and Austria (14th ed.), Leipzig: Karl Baedeker, 1913
- Switzerland, Together with Chamonix and the Italian Lakes (26th ed.), Leipzig: Karl Baedeker, 1922, OCLC 4248970
- Switzerland (27th ed.), Leipzig: Karl Baedeker, 1928
- Switzerland (28th ed.), Leipzig: Karl Baedeker, 1938

=== Syria ===
See Palestine

=== Trans-Siberian Railway ===
See Russia (1st ed, 1914), Karl Baedeker, Leipzig.

=== Tunisia ===
See Mediterranean

=== Turkey ===
- In German only: Constantinople and Asia Minor viz. Konstantinopel und Kleinasien, Karl Baedeker, Leipzig, 1905
- In German only: Constantinople and Asia Minor viz. Konstantinopel und Kleinasien, Balkanstaaten, Archipel, Cypern (2nd ed.), Karl Baedeker, Leipzig, 1914
- In 2015, Michael Wild, the Baedeker chronicler, published his translation into English of the 1914 Konstantinopel edition in German (ISBN 9781326174477 ).
- Also see Mediterranean – only English edition with Constantinople.

=== United States ===
- The United States, with an excursion into Mexico (2nd ed.), Leipzig: Karl Baedeker, 1899, OCLC 01520672
- The United States, with an excursion into Mexico (3rd ed.), Leipzig: Karl Baedeker, 1904, OCLC 00490822
- The United States, with Excursions to Mexico, Cuba, Porto Rico, and Alaska (4th ed.), Leipzig: K. Baedeker, 1909, OCLC 02338437, OL 14684345M. Index

=== Yugoslavia ===
- In German only: Dalmatia, Western Yugoslavia, Albania viz. Dalmatien und die Adria, Westliches Südslawien, Istrien, Budapest, Albanien, Korfu , Karl Baedeker, Leipzig, 1929.
- Austria-Hungary including Dalmatia, Bosnia, Bucharest, Belgrade, and Montenegro (10th ed. 1905) and (11th ed. 1911), Karl Baedeker, Leipzig.

== See also ==
- Karl Baedeker – the founder of Verlag Baedeker, the Baedeker publishing firm.
- Baedeker – for the history of the House of Baedeker.
