= Marià Aguiló =

Spanish poet and linguist

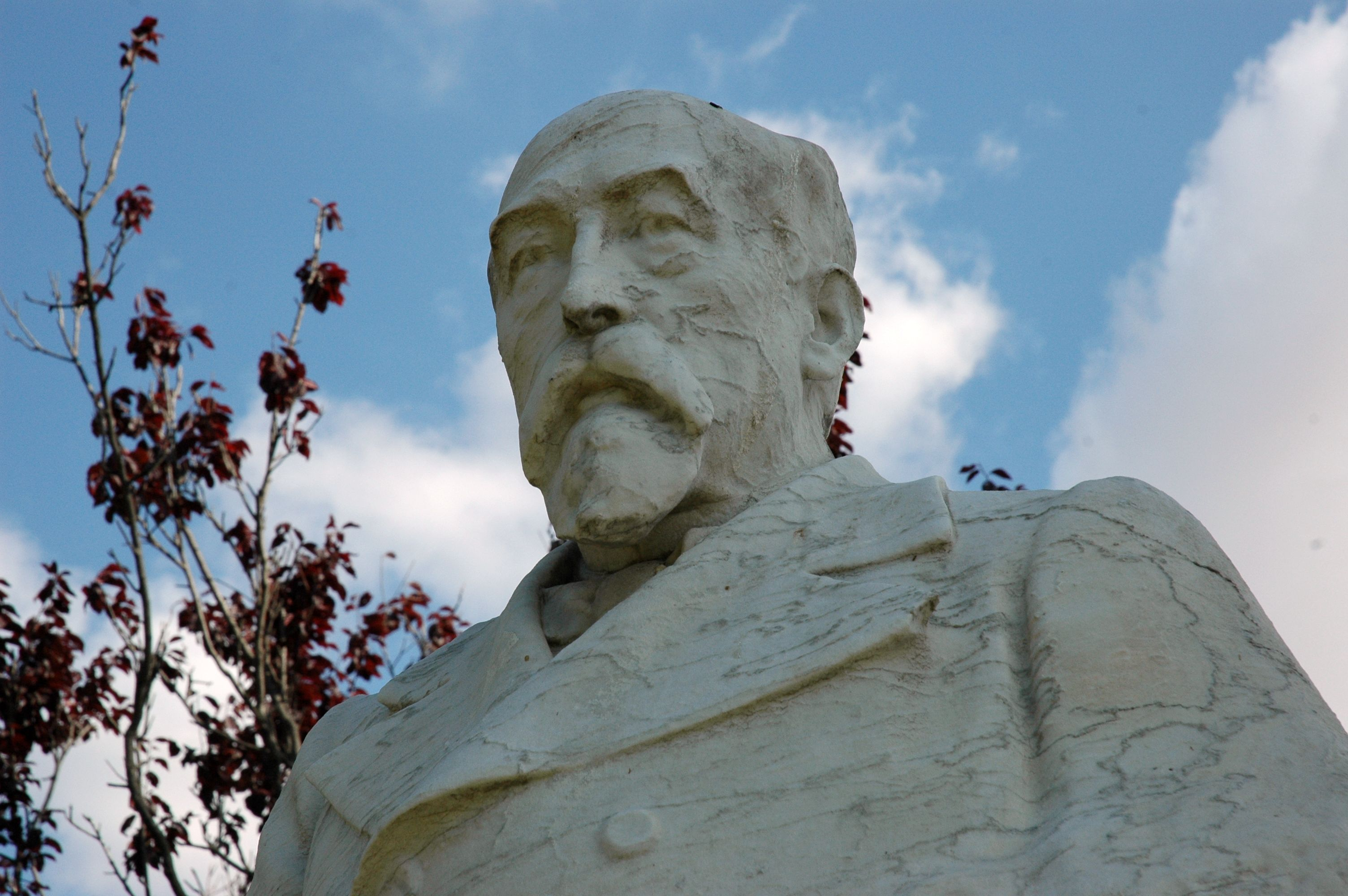
Bust of Aguiló by Eusebi Arnau, located in Parque de la Ciudadela (Barcelona), 1907.

Marià Aguiló (1825–1897) was a Spanish poet and linguist.

Born into a wealthy family of Xueta origin, he had an interest in Catalan culture from an early age.

Aguiló studied law in Barcelona, and was one of the founders of the Renaixença, a revivalist movement of Catalan culture in the 19th century. He was the director of the Valencia Province Library and later the director of the Barcelona Library. He published a great number of classic works of Catalan literature. Through his archivist research and field work in the territories where Catalan is spoken, he gathered a great deal of lexicographic material which he compiled in his Diccionari Aguiló. He also wrote a popular collection of romantic poems. His poetry was based on his profound knowledge of classic Catalan literature and ethnological sources.

The book Els poetes romàntics de Mallorca includes five poems by Aguiló: Ramon Llull aconsellant al poeta, Aubada, Esperaça, Enamorament impossible, and Això rai.
