= Ramón Aguiló =

Spanish politician (born 1950)

Ramón Aguiló Munar (born 3 February 1950) is a Spanish former politician. As a member of the Spanish Socialist Workers' Party (PSOE), he was the first democratically elected mayor of Palma de Mallorca, in office from 1979 to 1991.

== Biography ==
Born in Palma de Mallorca, Aguiló took scholarships to complete his Spanish Baccalaureate, while working in a photography workshop and as an electrician. From 1967 to 1972, he studied to become an industrial engineer in Barcelona.

In September 1974, in the last months of Francoist Spain, he joined the Balearic Socialist Federation. In December 1976, at the party's congress in Madrid, he became the Balearic representative on the PSOE's federal committee.

The 1979 Spanish local elections were the first democratic elections since the end of the regime. In Palma, the government party Union of the Democratic Centre (UCD) came first with 13 seats. The remaining seats were won by the PSOE (11), the Communist Party of Spain (PCE; 2) and the Socialist Party of Majorca (PSM; 1); these three left-wing parties formed a pact for Aguiló to become the mayor. Aguiló hung the flag of Catalonia from the City Hall alongside the flags of Spain, Mallorca and the Council of Europe, a decision which the UCD considered to be unconstitutional.

Aguiló served as mayor until 1991, with an absolute majority of seats in 1983. In 1987 he was re-elected due to the abstention of the three councillors from the Democratic and Social Centre (CDS), leaving a tie of 12 councillors from his party and 12 supporting Joan Fageda of the People's Alliance (AP). Aguiló said in 2009 that the PSOE establishment prevented him from rising in their ranks, by saying in the late 1980s that he was too young to be a member of the Congress of Deputies and impeding his attempt to run for general secretary of the Socialist Party of the Balearic Islands.

Aguiló quit the PSOE in 2001 due to disputes over the professionalisation of politics, the GAL scandal in the Basque Country, and the support of nationalist parties. He said that the last straw was the party siding with Maria Antònia Munar of the right-leaning Majorcan Union to install her as President of the Consejo Insular de Mallorca despite her party's low votes.

In 2003, the City Council awarded Aguiló their Gold Medal. In 2016, Matías Vallés of Cadena SER wrote that Aguiló was the only mayor of Palma to not feed police corruption in the city.

During his time as mayor, Aguiló faced antisemitism as his surname was one of 15 in the community of Xuetes, an endogamic group of formerly Jewish conversos in Mallorca.
