= Herbert Warren Wind =

American sportswriter

Herbert Warren Wind (August 11, 1916 – May 30, 2005) was an American sportswriter noted for his writings on golf.

== Early years ==
Born in Brockton, Massachusetts, Wind began golf at age seven at the Thorny Lea Golf Club in Brockton, and played whenever he could. He graduated from Yale University, where he contributed to campus humor magazine The Yale Record. He earned a master's degree in English Literature at the University of Cambridge. At Cambridge, Wind became friends with the noted British golf writer Bernard Darwin, a grandson of evolutionist Charles Darwin.

Wind was a low handicapper who played golf well enough to compete in the 1950 British Amateur Championship, and maintained a lifelong interest in the sport.

== Life and career ==
Wind began writing for The New Yorker in 1941, covered golf and sometimes other sports for that weekly magazine from 1947 until 1953, and again from 1960 until his retirement in 1990. From 1954 to 1960, he covered golf and sometimes other sports for Sports Illustrated magazine. Although associated with golf, Wind wrote articles on a wide range of sports including tennis, squash, basketball, and football.

In 1958, Wind coined the phrase 'Amen Corner' to describe the second shot at the 11th, all of the 12th, and the tee shot at the 13th hole at the Augusta National Golf Club, site of the annual Masters Tournament. That nickname, which is derived from a 1935 song that Wind had heard while a student at Yale, "Shoutin' in that Amen Corner" written by Andy Razaf, which was recorded by the Dorsey Brothers Orchestra, vocal by Mildred Bailey (Brunswick label No. 6655). Wind covered more than 30 Masters tournaments.

His first book was The Story of American Golf, which first appeared in 1948, and was updated and re-issued twice, the most recent in 1975. This book was the most comprehensive history of American golf to that juncture. Along with Ben Hogan, Wind co-authored Five Lessons: The Modern Fundamentals of Golf in 1957. This book has become one of the all-time classics of golf instruction, and has been re-issued many times.

He was a co-author of the 1976 book The World Atlas of Golf, a popular survey of the world's top golf courses, which has been re-issued since in several revised editions.

In 1983, with the help of Robert Macdonald, Wind co-founded and curated the Classics of Golf Library—a collection of the world's greatest golf literature. Under his guidance, the Classics of Golf Library was created to preserve and make available the works of the leading authors of early and modern golf literature. Wind and Macdonald reprinted these classic golf books and added forewords and afterwords to provide insight and perspective to the great literary works. Sixty-nine books make up the Classics of Golf Library today, which is featured in the USGA Museum.

In 1992, the PGA of America honored Wind with its lifetime achievement award. The United States Golf Association presented Wind with the Bob Jones Award, its highest award, in 1995, the centennial of the USGA. He is the only writer to receive the award.

== Death ==
Wind died in Bedford, Massachusetts at age 88.

== Awards and honors ==
- In 2006, the United States Golf Association renamed its annual Book Award in his honor
- In 2008, Wind was elected to the World Golf Hall of Fame in the Lifetime Achievement category.

== Selected books ==
Wind wrote or edited a number of books in addition to his numerous articles for magazines. His The Story of American Golf is considered a seminal work on the subject.

- The Complete Golfer, by Herbert Warren Wind, New York, Simon & Schuster, 1954.
- Game, Set, and Match: the Tennis Boom of the 1960s and 70s, by Herbert Warren Wind, New York, E.P. Dutton, 1979, ISBN 0-525-11140-9.
- The Gilded Age of Sport
- Great Stories from the World of Sport, co-editor with Peter Schwed
- The Greatest Game of All with Jack Nicklaus
- Herbert Warren Wind's Golf Book, by Herbert Warren Wind, New York, Simon & Schuster, 1971, ISBN 0-671-20808-X.
- Five Lessons: The Modern Fundamentals of Golf, by Ben Hogan and Herbert Warren Wind, 1957, ISBN 0-434-98105-2.
- On the Tour with Harry Sprague: Letters of a Golf Pro to His Sponsor, with an introduction by Jimmy Demaret, New York, Simon and Schuster, 1960.
- Playing Through
- The Realm of Sport, editor
- The Story of American Golf, by Herbert Warren Wind, Classics of Golf, 1948 (1st ed.) and 1975 (3rd ed.), ISBN 0-394-49020-7.
- Thirty Years of Championship Golf with Gene Sarazen
- Tips from the Top, editor
- Following Through, by Herbert Warren Wind, New York, Ticknor & Fields, 1985, ISBN 0-89919-398-6.
- The Encyclopedia of Golf, by Donald Steel and Peter Ryde American Advisory Editor: Herbert Warren Wind, New York, The Viking Press New York, 1975, ISBN 0-670-29401-2.
- The World of P.G. Wodehouse, by Herbert Warren Wind, Praeger, 1972, ISBN 0-09-145670-3.

=== Articles ===
- Wind, Herbert Warren (October 13, 1986). "The Sporting Scene: Mainly about Chris Evert Lloyd". The New Yorker. Vol. 62, no. 34. pp. 117–145.
- Wind, Herbert Warren (September 22, 1975). "The House of Baedeker". The New Yorker.
