= 1991–92 Atlético Madrid season =

Atlético Madrid
1991-1992 season
- Owner: Jesus Gil y Gil
- President: Jesus Gil
- Head coach: Luis Aragones
- Stadium: Vicente Calderon
- La Liga: 3rd
- Copa del Rey: Winners (In European Cup Winners' Cup)
- European Cup Winners' Cup: Quarterfinals
- Supercopa de España: Runners-up
- Top goalscorer: League: Manolo (27 goals); All: Manolo (36 goals)
Home colours	Away colours

The 1991–92 season was Atlético Madrid's 61st season since its foundation in 1903 and the club's 57th season in La Liga, Spanish football’s top division. Atlético competed in La Liga, the Supercopa de España, the Copa del Rey, and the European Cup Winners' Cup.

== Summary ==
The club finished third in La Liga and clinched the Copa del Rey defeating arch-rivals Real Madrid in the Final.

== Squad ==
Note: Flags indicate national team as defined under FIFA eligibility rules; some limited exceptions apply. Players may hold more than one non-FIFA nationality.

No.	Pos.	Nation	Player
—	GK	ESP	Abel Resino
—	GK	ESP	Diego Díaz Garrido
—	DF	ESP	Tomás Reñones
—	DF	ESP	Carlos Aguilera
—	DF	ESP	Roberto Solozábal
—	DF	ESP	Patxi Ferreira
—	DF	ESP	Juanito Rodríguez
—	DF	ESP	Juanma López
—	DF	ESP	Toni Muñoz
—	DF	ESP	Miquel Soler
—	DF	ESP	Pedro

No.	Pos.	Nation	Player
—	MF	BRA	Donato
—	MF	GER	Bernd Schuster
—	MF	ESP	Juan Vizcaíno
—	MF	ESP	Gabriel Moya
—	MF	ESP	Pizo Gómez
—	MF	ESP	Alfredo Santaelena
—	FW	POR	Paulo Futre
—	FW	AUT	Gerhard Rodax
—	FW	ESP	Manolo
—	FW	ESP	Sebastián Losada

=== Transfers ===
In
Pos.	Name	from	Type
MF	Gabriel Moya	Real Valladolid	
DF	Miquel Soler	FC Barcelona	
FW	Sebastián Losada	Real Madrid	
GK	Diego Díaz	Sporting de Gijón	loan ended

Out
Pos.	Name	To	Type
DF	Juan Carlos	FC Barcelona	-
MF	Julio Prieto	CP Merida	-

==== Winter ====
In
Pos.	Name	from	Type

Out
Pos.	Name	To	Type
MF	Pizo Gómez	RCD Espanyol	loan
FW	Gerhard Rodax	Rapid Wien	

== Competitions ==
=== La Liga ===
==== League table ====
Pos	Team	Pld	W	D	L	GF	GA	GD	Pts	Qualification or relegation
1	Barcelona (C)	38	23	9	6	87	37	+50	55	Qualification for the Champions League first round
2	Real Madrid	38	23	8	7	78	32	+46	54	Qualification for the UEFA Cup first round
3	Atlético Madrid	38	24	5	9	67	35	+32	53	Qualification for the Cup Winners' Cup first round (Note: Atlético Madrid qualified for the European Cup Winners' Cup as champions of the Copa del Rey.)
4	Valencia	38	20	7	11	63	42	+21	47	Qualification for the UEFA Cup first round
5	Real Sociedad	38	16	12	10	44	38	+6	44	Qualification for the UEFA Cup first round

Source: BDFútbol
Rules for classification: 1) Points; 2) Head-to-head results; 3) Goal difference; 4) Number of goals scored
(C) Champions

==== Results by round ====
Round	1	2	3	4	5	6	7	8	9	10	11	12	13	14	15	16	17	18	19	20	21	22	23	24	25	26	27	28	29	30	31	32	33	34	35	36	37	38
Ground	A	H	A	H	A	H	H	A	H	A	H	A	H	A	H	A	H	A	H	H	A	H	A	H	A	A	H	A	H	A	H	A	H	A	H	A	H	A
Result	W	W	W	W	W	W	L	W	L	W	D	W	L	L	W	W	L	L	L	D	W	W	W	L	W	D	D	W	W	W	W	W	W	W	L	W	D	W
Position	2	2	1	1	2	1	2	2	2	2	2	2	2	2	2	2	3	5	6	6	4	3	3	3	3	3	3	3	3	3	3	3	2	2	3	3	3	3

Source: Competitive matches
A = Away; H = Home; W = Win; D = Draw; L = Loss; = Leader, 1992–93 UEFA Champions League; = 1992–93 UEFA Cup

==== Matches ====
1 September 1991 1	Atlético Madrid	2–0	Real Burgos	Madrid
	Manolo 50' (pen.); Moya 80'; Futre (yellow card)	Report	(red card) 46' Elduayen; (red card) 46' Ayucar; (yellow card) Alejandro; (yellow card) Lito	Stadium: Vicente Calderon; Referee: Gracia Redondo

8 September 1991 2	RCD Mallorca	0–2	Atlético Madrid	Palma de Mallorca
		Report	76' Manolo; 89' Schuster	Stadium: Lluis Sitjar; Referee: Pajares Paz

13 September 1991 3	Atlético Madrid	3–0	RCD Español	Madrid
	Manolo 12'; Moya 14'; Vizcaíno 55'	Report	(red card) 60' Wuttke	Stadium: Vicente Calderon; Referee: Calvo Córdova

27 September 1991 4	Real Sociedad	0–2	Atlético Madrid	San Sebastián
		Report	40' Moya; 83' Vizcaíno	Stadium: Atotxa; Referee: Pérez Sánchez

6 October 1991 5	Atlético Madrid	2–1	Real Zaragoza	Madrid
	Soler 34'; Losada 53'	Report	89' Salva	Stadium: Vicente Calderon; Referee: Gómez López

19 October 1991 6	Real Oviedo	0–1	Atlético Madrid	Oviedo
		Report	53' Vizcaíno; 68' Futre	Stadium: Carlos Tartiere; Referee: Rubio Valdivieso

27 October 1991 7	FC Barcelona	1–0	Atlético Madrid	Barcelona
	Stoichkov 39'; Cristobal (yellow card)	Report	(yellow card) Schuester; (yellow card) Toni	Stadium: Camp Nou; Referee: Marin Lopez

1 November 1991 8	Atlético Madrid	1–0	Osasuna	Madrid
	Manolo 31' (pen.)	Report		Stadium: Vicente Calderon; Referee: Panadero Martínez

9 November 1991 9	Valencia CF	2–0	Atlético Madrid	Valencia
	Giner 23'; Penev 89'	Report	(yellow card) 84' (yellow-red card) Juanito	Stadium: Mestalla; Referee: Enríquez Negreira

16 November 1991 10	Atlético Madrid	1–0	CD Tenerife	Madrid
	Sabas 80'	Report	(yellow card) 86' (yellow-red card) Manolo Hierro	Stadium: Vicente Calderon; Referee: Díaz Vega

23 November 1991 11	Cádiz CF	1–1	Atlético Madrid	Cádiz
	Mejías 14'	Report	30' Donato	Stadium: Nuevo Mirandilla; Referee: Rodríguez Martel

30 November 1991 12	Atlético Madrid	5–1	Real Valladolid	Madrid
	Manolo 1' (pen.); Manolo 51'; Manolo 55'; Schuster 68'; Schuster 89'	Report	60' Fonseca	Stadium: Vicente Calderon; Referee: Ansuategui Roca

6 December 1991 13	Athletic Bilbao	3–2	Atlético Madrid	Bilbao
	Garitano 22' (pen.); Eskurza 35'; Patxi Salinas 42'	Report	14' (pen.) Manolo; 89' (pen.) Manolo; (yellow card) 67' (yellow-red card) Juanito	Stadium: San Mamés; Referee: Ramos Marcos

14 December 1991 14	Atlético Madrid	0–3	Sevilla CF	Madrid
	Schuster 20'	Report	16' Zamorano; 66' Zamorano; 76' Andrades; 67 ' Diego; (yellow card) 85' (yellow-red card) Andrades	Stadium: Vicente Calderon; Referee: Merino González

21 December 1991 15	Sporting de Gijón	0–1	Atlético Madrid	Gijón
		Report	8' Juanito; (yellow card) 89' (yellow-red card) Ferreira	Stadium: El Molinon; Referee: Calvo Córdova

3 January 1992 16	Atlético Madrid	2–0	Real Madrid	Madrid
	Vizcaino 1'; Manolo 47'	Report	(yellow card) Michel	Stadium: Estadio Vicente Calderón; Referee: Marin Lopez

11 January 1992 17	Logroñes CF	1–0	Atlético Madrid	Logroño
	García Pitarch 82'	Report	(red card) 33' Carlos Aguilera	Stadium: Las Gaunas; Referee: Sosa Saavedra

17 January 1992 18	Atlético Madrid	1–2	Deportivo La Coruña	Madrid
	Vizcaíno 86'	Report	46' Mujika; 74' Joaquín Villa; (yellow card) 84' (yellow-red card) Kanatlarovski	Stadium: Vicente Calderon; Referee: Vico Díaz

25 January 1992 19	Albacete Balompié	3–1	Atlético Madrid	Albacete
	Catali 38'; Menéndez 68'; Julio Soler 80'	Report	75' Manolo	Stadium: Carlos Belmonte; Referee: Pérez Sánchez

1 February 1992 20	Real Burgos	1–1	Atlético Madrid	Burgos
	Loren 25'	Report	66' Futre	Stadium: El Plantío; Referee: Urío Velázquez

8 February 1992 21	Atlético Madrid	3–0	RCD Mallorca	Madrid
	Futre 39'; Futre 43'; Manolo 51'	Report		Stadium: Vicente Calderon; Referee: Paz García

15 February 1992 22	RCD Español	1–2	Atlético Madrid	Barcelona
	Kuznetsov 65'	Report	10' Manolo; 13' Schuster	Stadium: Sarriá; Referee: Bello Blanco

21 February 1992 23	Atlético Madrid	5–1	Real Sociedad	Madrid
	Ferreira 5'; Schuster 41'; Moya 53'; Vizcaíno 78'; Vizcaíno 81'	Report	45' Kodro	Stadium: Vicente Calderon; Referee: Hernández Velázquez

28 February 1992 24	Real Zaragoza	1–0	Atlético Madrid	Zaragoza
	Higuera 54'; Aguado (yellow card) 89' (yellow-red card)	Report	(red card) 77' Tomas; (yellow card) 79' (yellow-red card) Schuster	Stadium: La Romareda; Referee: Gómez Barril

6 March 1992 25	Atlético Madrid	3–1	Real Oviedo	Madrid
	Andrés 5' (o.g.); Aguilera 31'; Vizcaíno 43'	Report	86' Carlos	Stadium: Vicente Calderon; Referee: Miró Pastor

13 March 1992 26	Atlético Madrid	2–2	FC Barcelona	Madrid
	Manolo 6'; Manolo 15'; Lopez (yellow card); Solozabal (yellow card); Vizcaino (yellow card); Schuster (yellow card)	Report	74' Nadal; 80' Bakero; (yellow card) 75' (yellow-red card) Stoichkov	Stadium: Vicente Calderon; Referee: Diaz Vega

22 March 1992 27	Osasuna	1–1	Atlético Madrid	Pamplona
	Urban 67'	Report	48' Manolo	Stadium: El Sadar; Referee: Ansuategui Roca

27 March 1992 28	Atlético Madrid	1–0	Valencia CF	Madrid
	Manolo 60'	Report		Stadium: Vicente Calderon; Referee: Rodríguez Martel

4 April 1992 29	CD Tenerife	0–1	Atlético Madrid	Santa Cruz de Tenerife
		Report	28' Vizcaíno; 65' Carlos Aguilera	Stadium: Heliodoro Rodriguez; Referee: Gracia Redondo

10 April 1992 30	Atlético Madrid	5–1	Cádiz CF	Madrid
	Manolo 38'; Manolo 40'; Manolo 51'; Manolo 75'; Sabas 83'	Report	80' Mário Tilico	Stadium: Vicente Calderon; Referee: Jiménez Moreno

18 April 1992 31	Real Valladolid	0–1	Atlético Madrid	Valladolid
		Report	16' Manolo	Stadium: Jose Zorrilla; Referee: Martínez de Lafuente

25 April 1992 32	Atlético Madrid	3–1	Athletic Bilbao	Madrid
	Juanito 44'; Manolo 65'; Diego (red card) 65'; Futre 83'	Report	41' Garitano 41'; (penalty missed) 42' Garitano; 17' Tabuenka	Stadium: Vicente Calderon; Referee: Rubio Valdivieso

2 May 1992 33	Sevilla CF	0–1	Atlético Madrid	Sevilla
	Zamorano (red card) 59'	Report	13' Futre	Stadium: Sanchez Pizjuan; Referee: Gómez López

8 May 1992 34	Atlético Madrid	2–1	Sporting de Gijón	Madrid
	Sabas 58'; Manolo 65' (pen.); Donato (yellow card) 80' (yellow-red card)	Report	20' (pen.)Joaquín; (red card) 69' Tati	Stadium: Vicente Calderon; Referee: Barrenechea Montero

15 May 1992 35	Real Madrid	3–2	Atlético Madrid	Madrid
	Enrique 20'; Butragueno 69'; Maqueda 76'	Report	Manolo 6'; Aguilera 54'	Stadium: Estadio Santiago Bernabéu

22 May 1992 36	Atlético Madrid	2–1	Logroñes CF	Madrid
	Aguilera 32'; Moya 82'	Report	33' García Pitarch	Stadium: Vicente Calderon; Referee: Bello Blanco

30 May 1992 37	Deportivo La Coruña	1–1	Atlético Madrid	A Coruña
	Djukić 20' (pen.)	Report	55'Futre; (yellow card) 63' (yellow-red card) Futre	Stadium: Riazor; Referee: Pajares Paz

6 June 1992 38	Atlético Madrid	4–1	Albacete Balompié	Madrid
	Abel Resino (red card) 10'; Alfaro 31'; Manolo 59'; Manolo 77'; Schuster 89'	Report	63' Chesa	Stadium: Vicente Calderon; Referee: Andradas Asurmendi

=== Copa del Rey ===
==== Eightfinals ====
8 January 1992	Real Oviedo	1–0	Atlético Madrid	Oviedo
	Sarriugarte 16'	Report		Stadium: Carlos Tartiere; Attendance: 9,342; Referee: Martinez de la Fuente

22 January 1992	Atlético Madrid	5–0	Real Oviedo	Madrid
	Futre 13', 78'; Muñoz 33'; Moya 41'; Manolo 57'	Report		Stadium: Vicente Calderón; Attendance: 6,000; Referee: Enriquez Negreira

==== Quarterfinals ====
5 February 1992	Athletic Bilbao	0–3	Atlético Madrid	Bilbao
		Report	17' (pen.) Manolo; 50', 75' Futre	Stadium: San Mamés; Attendance: 20,000; Referee: José Luis Pajares Paz

26 February 1992	Atlético Madrid	1–0	Athletic Bilbao	Madrid
	Vizcaíno 86' (pen.)	Report		Stadium: Vicente Calderón; Attendance: 3,000; Referee: Riera Morro

==== Semifinals ====
14 June 1992	Atlético Madrid	2–0	Deportivo La Coruña	Madrid
20:00 CEST	Manolo 48'; Schuster 69'	Report		Stadium: Stadio Vicente Calderón; Attendance: 18,000; Referee: Ángel Calvo Córdova

20 June 1992	Deportivo La Coruña	1–1	Atlético Madrid	A Coruña
19:00 CEST	Djukic 81' (pen.)	Report	58' Manolo	Stadium: Riazor; Attendance: 29,000; Referee: José María Enríquez Negreira

==== Final ====
27 June 1992	Real Madrid	0–2	Atlético Madrid	Madrid
21:00 CEST		Report	7' Schuster; 29' Futre	Stadium: Santiago Bernabéu; Attendance: 70,000; Referee: Manuel Díaz Vega

=== European Cup Winners' Cup ===
==== Second round ====
18 September 1991	Fyllingen Fotball (Norway)	0–1	(Spain) Atlético Madrid	Bergen
		Report	29' Manolo	Stadium: Varden Amfi; Attendance: 4,333; Referee: Keith Burge

2 October 1991	Atlético Madrid (Spain)	7–2	(Norway) Fyllingen Fotball	Madrid
	Schuster 5', 90'; Manolo 19', 35' (pen.), 87'; Soler 41'; Futre 81'	Report	55', 69' Tengs	Stadium: Vicente Calderón; Attendance: 18,000; Referee: Freddy Philippoz

==== Eightfinals ====
23 October 1991	Atlético Madrid (Spain)	3–0	(England) Manchester United	Madrid
	Futre 33', 88'; Manolo 90'	Report		Stadium: Vicente Calderón; Attendance: 40,500; Referee: (Germany) Bernd Heynemann

6 November 1991	Manchester United (England)	1–1	(Spain) Atlético Madrid	Manchester
	Hughes 4'	Report	23' Schuster	Stadium: Old Trafford; Attendance: 39,654; Referee: Guy Goethals

==== Quarterfinals ====
4 March 992	Atlético Madrid (Spain)	3–2	(Belgium) Club Brugge	Madrid
	Schuster 30'; Toni 48'; Futre 58'	Report	32' Verspaille; 43' Beyens	Stadium: Vicente Calderón; Attendance: 20,000; Referee: (Switzerland) Bruno Galler

18 March 1992	Club Brugge (Belgium)	2–1	(Spain) Atlético Madrid	Bruges
	Querter 40' (rig); Booy 62'	Report	10' Futre	Stadium: Jan Breydel; Attendance: 28,000; Referee: Rune Larsson

=== Supercopa ===
15 October 1991	Atlético Madrid	0–1	FC Barcelona	Madrid
21:00 CET		Report	86' Amor	Stadium: Vicente Calderon; Attendance: 15,000; Referee: José Merino González

29 October 1991	FC Barcelona	1–1	Atlético Madrid	Barcelona
20:45 CET	Bakero 69'	Report	39' Alfredo	Stadium: Camp Nou; Attendance: 45,000; Referee: José Luis Pajares Paz

=== Copa Iberica ===
7 August 1991	Benfica (Portugal)	1–1	(Spain) Atlético Madrid	Lisbon
	Pacheco 48'		83' Donato	Stadium: da Luz; Referee: Jorge Coroado

13 August 1991	Atlético Madrid (Spain)	3–2	(Portugal) Benfica	Marbella
	Losada 53', 89'; Schuster 85'		27' Magnusson; 30' V. Paneira	Stadium: Municipal de Marbella; Attendance: 9,000; Referee: Hernandez Velazquez

== Statistics ==
=== Squad statistics ===
Competition	Points	Total						GD
Competition	Points	G	W	D	L	Gs	Ga	GD
La Liga	53	38	24	5	9	67	35	+32
Copa del Rey	-	7	5	1	1	14	2	+12
UEFA Cup Winners' Cup	-	6	4	1	1	16	7	+9
1991 Supercopa de España	-	2	0	1	1	1	2	-1
Copa Iberica	-	2	1	1	0	4	3	+1
Totale	53	55	34	9	12	102	49	+53

==== Players statistics ====
No.	Pos	Nat	Player	Total		La Liga		Copa del Rey		European Cup Winners' Cup	
No.	Pos	Nat	Player	Apps	Goals	Apps	Goals	Apps	Goals	Apps	Goals
	GK	(Spain) ESP	Abel Resino	44	-37	32	-29	6	-2	6	-6
	DF	(Spain) ESP	Tomas	43	0	30+2	0	5	0	6	0
	DF	(Spain) ESP	Solozabal	49	0	37	0	6	0	6	0
	DF	(Spain) ESP	Juanito	36	2	26+2	2	2	0	6	0
	DF	(Spain) ESP	Soler	35	2	21+4	1	5	0	4+1	1
	MF	(Brazil) BRA	Donato	45	1	32+4	1	6+1	0	2	0
	MF	(Spain) ESP	Vizcaino	49	10	36	9	6+1	1	6	0
	MF	(Germany) GER	Schuster	46	12	34	6	6	2	6	4
	MF	(Spain) ESP	Moya	41	6	25+6	5	3+1	1	5+1	0
	FW	(Portugal) POR	Futre	43	16	31	6	5+1	5	6	5
	FW	(Spain) ESP	Manolo	49	36	35+1	27	7	4	6	5
	GK	(Spain) ESP	Diego Diaz	9	-6	6	-5	1	0	0+2	-1
	DF	(Spain) ESP	Toni	39	2	21+9	0	4+1	1	3+1	1
	MF	(Spain) ESP	Patxi Ferreira	27	1	16+5	1	3	0	3	0
	DF	(Spain) ESP	Aguilera	27	3	12+11	3	2	0	0+2	0
	DF	(Spain) ESP	Juanma López	19	0	11+1	0	4+1	0	1+1	0
	FW	(Spain) ESP	Juan Sabas	21	3	4+11	3	1+4	0	0+1	0
	MF	(Spain) ESP	Alfredo	15	0	4+5	0	3+3	0		
	FW	(Spain) ESP	Losada	10	1	2+7	1	0	0	0+1	0
	FW	(Spain) ESP	Manuel Alfaro	3	1	1+1	1	1	0		
	MF	(Spain) ESP	Orejuela	3	0	1+1	0	0+1	0		
	DF	(Spain) ESP	Pedro	4	0	1+2	0	1	0		
	GK	(Spain) ESP	Mejias	2	-1	0+2	-1	0	0	0	0
	FW	(Austria) AUT	Rodax	1	0	0+1	0				
	MF	(Spain) ESP	Gomez								

- Source: https://www.bdfutbol.com/en/t/t1991-927.html
