= 1990–91 Atlético Madrid season =

Atlético Madrid
1990-1991 season
- Owner: Jesús Gil
- President: Jesús Gil
- Manager: Iselín Ovejero (Until 3 September 1990); Tomislav Ivić
- Stadium: Vicente Calderon
- La Liga: 2nd
- Copa del Rey: Winners (in European Cup Winners' Cup)
- UEFA Cup: First round
- Top goalscorer: League: Manolo (16); All: Manolo (18)
Home colours	Away colours

The 1990–91 season was Atlético Madrid's 60th season since foundation in 1903 and the club's 56th season in La Liga, the top league of Spanish football. Atlético competed in La Liga, the Copa del Rey, and the UEFA Cup.

== Summary ==
In his third campaign as club president, Jesus Gil y Gil -after Donato became a citizen of Spain on 7 September 1990, and transferred out Striker Baltazar to FC Porto-reinforced the squad with German playmaker Bernd Schuster from Real Madrid who was discarded by John Benjamin Toshack during summer. On the bench was Ovejero only one round and Tomislav Ivić managed the rest of the campaign, driving the club to a decent second spot ten points behind Champion FC Barcelona. After 18 undefeated matches, including a massive 13 clean sheet games (Abel Resino held the record for the longest clean sheet in La Liga at 1,275 minutes, was also the European record in a single season during 18 years until 2009, when Edwin van Der Sar from Manchester United broke it against Fulham) on 7 April 1991 the team was a mere 4 points behind FC Barcelona on the race for the league title, then, the squad collapsed since the 31 round only clinching three points over the final 9 rounds shattered its options for the trophy. It was bizarre a 2-2 match against Osasuna, with a massive number of 4 penalties failed. The last league match was controversial, Español was needed to win the game in order to avoid Relegation to Segunda Division meanwhile, according to Paulo Futre, President Jesus Gil asked not to win the match against Periquitos in exchange for soon-to-be Atletico's head coach Luis Aragones then Español manager and the transfer of Rodax.

In Copa del Rey the squad defeated Real Madrid in eightfinals and FC Barcelona in semifinals advancing to the Final against underdogs Real Club Deportivo Mallorca, clinching its 7th trophy after extra time. In UEFA Cup the squad early was eliminated in first round by Timișoara.

== Squad ==
Note: Flags indicate national team as defined under FIFA eligibility rules; some limited exceptions apply. Players may hold more than one non-FIFA nationality.

No.	Pos.	Nation	Player
-	GK	ESP	Abel Resino
-	GK	ESP	Ángel Mejías
-	DF	ESP	Tomás Reñones
-	DF	ESP	Juanito
-	DF	ESP	Patxi Ferreira
-	DF	ESP	Pedro González Martínez
-	DF	ESP	Roberto Solozábal
-	DF	ESP	Pizo Gómez
-	DF	ESP	Toni Muñoz
-	DF	ESP	Juan Carlos Rodríguez

No.	Pos.	Nation	Player
-	MF	ESP	Antonio Orejuela
-	MF	BRA	Donato
-	MF	ESP	Juan Vizcaíno
-	MF	GER	Bernd Schuster
-	MF	ESP	Julio Prieto
-	MF	ESP	Alfredo Santaelena
-	FW	ESP	Manolo
-	FW	POR	Paulo Futre
-	FW	ESP	Juan Sabas
-	FW	AUT	Gerhard Rodax

=== Transfers ===
In
Pos.	Name	from	Type
MF	Bernd Schuster	Real Madrid	
FW	Gerhard Rodax	Admira Wacker	
DF	Juanito	Real Zaragoza	
DF	Pedro Gonzalez	Logroñes CF	
DF	Toni Muñoz	Atlético Madrileño	
MF	Juan Vizcaíno	Real Zaragoza	
MF	Julio Prieto	Celta de Vigo	
FW	Juan Sabas	Rayo Vallecano	

Out
Pos.	Name	To	Type
FW	Baltazar	FC Porto	-
GK	Agustin Elduayen	Burgos CF	-
DF	Eugenio Bustingorri	Osasuna	-
DF	Andoni Goikoetxea		retired
MF	Agustin Abadia	CD Logroñes	-
MF	Roberto Marina	RCD Mallorca	-

==== Winter ====
In
Pos.	Name	from	Type

Out
Pos.	Name	To	Type

== Competitions ==
=== La Liga ===
==== League table ====
Pos	Team	Pld	W	D	L	GF	GA	GD	Pts	Qualification or relegation
1	Barcelona (C)	38	25	7	6	74	33	+41	57	Qualification for the European Cup first round
2	Atlético Madrid	38	17	13	8	52	28	+24	47	Qualification for the Cup Winners' Cup first round (Note: Atlético Madrid qualified for the European Cup Winners' Cup as champions of the Copa del Rey.)
3	Real Madrid	38	20	6	12	63	37	+26	46	Qualification for the UEFA Cup first round
4	Osasuna	38	15	15	8	43	34	+9	45	Qualification for the UEFA Cup first round
5	Sporting Gijón	38	16	12	10	50	37	+13	44	Qualification for the UEFA Cup first round

Source: BDFútbol
Rules for classification: 1) Points; 2) Head-to-head results; 3) Goal difference; 4) Number of goals scored
(C) Champions

==== Results by round ====
Round	1	2	3	4	5	6	7	8	9	10	11	12	13	14	15	16	17	18	19	20	21	22	23	24	25	26	27	28	29	30	31	32	33	34	35	36	37	38
Ground	A	H	A	H	A	H	H	A	H	A	H	A	H	A	H	A	H	A	H	H	A	H	A	H	A	A	H	A	H	A	H	A	H	A	H	A	H	A
Result	D	W	D	D	L	D	W	D	W	D	W	L	W	W	W	W	D	W	W	W	D	W	D	W	W	W	D	D	W	D	L	L	D	L	W	L	L	L
Position	9	6	7	7	9	9	5	7	5	5	4	6	6	4	2	2	2	2	2	2	2	2	2	2	2	2	2	2	2	2	2	2	2	2	2	2	2	2

Source: Competitive matches
A = Away; H = Home; W = Win; D = Draw; L = Loss; = Leader, 1991–92 European Cup; = 1991–92 UEFA Cup

==== Matches ====
2 September 1990 1	Valencia CF	1–1	Atletico Madrid	Valencia
	Eloy 50'	Report	74' Rodax	Stadium: Mestalla; Referee: Paz García

9 September 1990 2	Atletico Madrid	2–1	Real Betis	Madrid
	Futre 47'; Rodax 52'	Report	79' Mel	Stadium: Vicente Calderón; Referee: Martínez de la Fuente

15 September 1990 3	Real Valladolid	0–0	Atletico Madrid	Valladolid
		Report		Stadium: José Zorrilla; Referee: Jiménez Moreno

23 September 1990 4	Atletico Madrid	1–1	CD Tenerife	Madrid
	Alfredo 6'	Report	30' Felipe	Stadium: Vicente Calderón; Referee: González Lecue

29 September 1990 5	Athletic Bilbao	2–1	Atletico Madrid	Bilbao
	Loren 46'; Valverde 71'	Report	66' Manolo	Stadium: San Mamés; Referee: Socorro González

7 October 1990 6	Atletico Madrid	2–2	Osasuna	Madrid
	Juanito 5' (rig); Vizcaíno 35'	Report	63' Bustingorri; 86' Urban	Stadium: Vicente Calderón; Referee: Merino González

14 October 1990 7	Sporting Gijon	1–2	Atletico Madrid	Gijón
	Luhový 87'	Report	63' Sabas; 68' Rodax	Stadium: El Molinón; Referee: Ansuátegui Roca

21 October 1990 8	Atletico Madrid	0–0	Real Burgos	Madrid
		Report		Stadium: Vicente Calderón; Referee: Peraita Ibáñez

27 October 1990 9	Atletico Madrid	2–1	FC Barcelona	Madrid
	Schuster 53'; Futre 70'	Report	55' Stoičkov	Stadium: Vicente Calderón; Referee: Valdés Sánchez

4 November 1990 10	CD Castellon	0–0	Atletico Madrid	Castellón de la Plana
		Report		Stadium: Castalia; Referee: Gómez López

18 November 1990 11	Atletico Madrid	1–0	Sevilla CF	Madrid
	Manolo 36'	Report		Stadium: Vicente Calderón; Referee: Pérez Sánchez

25 November 1990 12	RCD Mallorca	1–0	Atletico Madrid	Palma di Maiorca
	Claudio 30'	Report		Stadium: Lluís Sitjar; Referee: Pajares Paz

2 December 1990 13	Atletico Madrid	4–0	Real Zaragoza	Madrid
	Rodax 26' (rig); Manolo 75', 90'; Tomás 86'	Report		Stadium: Vicente Calderón; Referee: Bello Blanco

8 December 1990 14	Cadiz CF	0–1	Atletico Madrid	Cadice
		Report	52' (pen.) Rodax	Stadium: Ramón de Carranza; Referee: Calvo Córdova

16 December 1990 15	Atletico Madrid	4–0	Real Sociedad	Madrid
	Manolo 7', 71'; Sabas 86'; Schuster 90'	Report		Stadium: Vicente Calderón; Referee: Díaz Agüero

29 December 1990 16	Logroñes CF	0–1	Atletico Madrid	Logroño
		Report	72' (pen.) Manolo	Stadium: Las Gaunas; Referee: Taboada Soto

6 January 1991 17	Atletico Madrid	0–0	Real Oviedo	Madrid
		Report		Stadium: Vicente Calderón; Referee: Jiménez Moreno

12 January 1991 18	Real Madrid	0–3	Atletico Madrid	Madrid
		Report	6' Manolo; 31' Juanito; 86' Rodax	Stadium: Santiago Bernabéu; Referee: Enríquez Negreira

20 January 1991 19	Atletico Madrid	4–0	RCD Español	Madrid
	Juanito 15'; Manolo 32'; Schuster 66'; Futre 90'	Report		Stadium: Vicente Calderón; Referee: Ansuátegui Roca

26 January 1991 20	Atletico Madrid	2–0	Valencia CF	Madrid
	Manolo 65'; Rodax 87'	Report		Stadium: Vicente Calderón; Referee: Paz García

3 February 1991 21	Betis	0–0	Atletico Madrid	Sevilla
		Report		Stadium: Benito Villamarín; Referee: Valdés Sánchez

10 February 1991 22	Atletico Madrid	2–0	Real Valladolid	Madrid
	Schuster 86'; Alfredo 89'	Report		Stadium: Vicente Calderón; Referee: Panadero Martínez

24 February 1991 23	CD Tenerife	0–0	Atletico Madrid	Santa Cruz
		Report		Stadium: Heliodoro Rodríguez López; Referee: Rubio Valdivieso

3 March 1991 24	Atletico Madrid	2–0	Athletic Bilbao	Madrid
	Sabas 49'; Manolo 61'	Report		Stadium: Vicente Calderón; Referee: Merino González

9 March 1991 25	Osasuna	0–3	Atletico Madrid	Pamplona
		Report	25', 80' Solozábal; 29' Manolo	Stadium: El Sadar; Referee: Pajares Paz

17 March 1991 26	Atletico Madrid	3–1	Sporting Gijon	Madrid
	Manolo 11', 23' (pen.); Juanito 74'	Report	45' Luis Enrique	Stadium: Vicente Calderón; Referee: Brito Arceo

23 March 1991 27	Burgos	1–1	Atletico Madrid	Burgos
	Tamayo 14'	Report	34' Manolo	Stadium: El Plantío; Referee: Pérez Sánchez

30 March 1991 28	FC Barcelona	1–1	Atletico Madrid	Barcelona
	Salinas 57'	Report	64' Vizcaíno	Stadium: Camp Nou; Referee: Ramos Marcos

7 April 1991 29	Atletico Madrid	3–1	CD Castellon	Madrid
	Ferreira 37', 49'; Rodax 74'	Report	28' Alcañiz	Stadium: Vicente Calderón; Referee: Martínez de la Fuente

13 April 1991 30	Sevilla CF	1–1	Atletico Madrid	Sevilla
	Ramón 47'	Report	71' Rodax	Stadium: Ramón Sánchez-Pizjuán; Referee: Panadero Martínez

21 April 1991 31	Atletico Madrid	0–1	RCD Mallorca	Madrid
		Report	86' Claudio	Stadium: Vicente Calderón; Referee: Hernández Velázquez

28 April 1991 32	Real Zaragoza	1–0	Atletico Madrid	Zaragoza
	Pardeza 25'	Report		Stadium: La Romareda; Referee: Jiménez Moreno

5 May 1991 33	Atletico Madrid	0–0	Cadiz CF	Madrid
		Report		Stadium: Vicente Calderón; Referee: Merino González

12 May 1991 34	Real Sociedad	2–1	Atletico Madrid	San Sebastián
	Atkinson 37'; Aldridge 79'	Report	5' (o.g.) Larrañaga	Stadium: Atocha; Referee: Sosa Saavedra

19 May 1991 35	Atletico Madrid	3–0	CD Logroñes	Madrid
	Juanito 43'; Manolo 51'; Alfredo 73'	Report		Stadium: Vicente Calderón; Referee: Calvo Córdova

26 May 1991 36	Real Oviedo	3–0	Atletico Madrid	Oviedo
	Sarriugarte 47'; Carlos 62', 82'	Report		Stadium: Carlos Tartiere; Referee: Marín López

2 June 1991 37	Atletico Madrid	0–3	Real Madrid	Madrid
		Report	71' Míchel; 87', 90' Butragueño	Stadium: Vicente Calderón; Referee: Ramos Marcos

9 June 1991 38	Español	3–1	Atletico Madrid	Barcelona
	Escaich 31', 90'; Mendiondo 35'	Report	57' Vizcaíno	Stadium: Sarriá; Referee: Brito Arceo

=== Copa del Rey ===
==== Eightfinals ====
7 February 1991	Real Madrid	1–1	Atletico Madrid	Madrid
	Sánchez 56'	Report	36' Rodax	Stadium: Santiago Bernabéu; Attendance: 60,000; Referee: Ramos Marcos

27 February 1991	Atletico Madrid	1–0	Real Madrid	Madrid
	Donato 57'	Report		Stadium: Vicente Calderón; Attendance: 50,000; Referee: Ansuátegui Roca

==== Quarterfinals ====
13 June 1991	Real Valladolid	0–2	Atletico Madrid	Valladolid
20:30 CEST		Report	13' Juanito; 28' Schuster	Stadium: José Zorrilla; Attendance: 12,000; Referee: Pajares Paz

16 June 1991	Atletico Madrid	0–1	Real Valladolid	Madrid
21:00 CEST		Report	81' (pen.) Fonseca	Stadium: Vicente Calderón; Attendance: 35,000; Referee: Merino González

==== Semifinals ====
20 June 1991	FC Barcelona	0–2	Atletico Madrid	Barcelona
21:00 CEST		Report	35' Futre; 60' Manolo	Stadium: Camp Nou; Attendance: 55,000; Referee: Valdés Sánchez

23 June 1991	Atletico Madrid	2–3	FC Barcelona	Madrid
	Solozábal 44'; Manolo 79'	Report	20', 27' Salinas; 71' Koeman	Stadium: Vicente Calderón; Attendance: 30,000; Referee: Ansuátegui Roca

==== Final ====
29 June 1991	Atletico Madrid	1–0 (a.e.t.)	RCD Mallorca	Madrid
20:30 CEST	Alfredo 111'	Report		Stadium: Santiago Bernabéu; Attendance: 60,000; Referee: Ramos Marcos

=== UEFA Cup ===
19 September 1990	Timisoara (Romania)	2–0	(Spain) Atletico Madrid	Timisoara
14:45 CEST	Bungău 43' (rig); Octavian Popescu 62'	Report		Stadium: Dan Păltinişanu; Attendance: 40,000; Referee: Namoğlu

3 October 1990	Atletico Madrid (Spain)	1–0	(Romania) Timisoara	Madrid
20:00 CEST	Juanito 88'	Report		Stadium: Vicente Calderón; Attendance: 55,000; Referee: (Belgium) Van Den Wijngaert

== Statistics ==
=== Players statistics ===
No.	Pos	Nat	Player	Total		1990-91 La Liga		1990-91 Copa del Rey		1990-91 UEFA Cup	
No.	Pos	Nat	Player	Apps	Goals	Apps	Goals	Apps	Goals	Apps	Goals
-	GK	(Spain) ESP	Abel	37	-20	33	-17	2	-1	2	-2
-	DF	(Spain) ESP	Tomas	42	1	33	1	7	0	2	0
-	DF	(Spain) ESP	Juanito	43	7	36	5	6	1	1	1
-	DF	(Spain) ESP	Solozabal	43	2	36	2	7	0		
-	DF	(Spain) ESP	Juan Carlos	28	0	23+1	0	2	0	2	0
-	MF	(Brazil) BRA	Donato	28	1	25	0	2	1	1	0
-	MF	(Spain) ESP	Vizcaino	41	3	33+1	3	7	0		
-	MF	(Germany) GER	Schuster	36	5	29	4	7	1		
-	FW	(Austria) AUT	Rodax	30	10	21+5	9	1+1	1	2	0
-	FW	(Spain) ESP	Manolo	46	18	35+2	16	7	2	2	0
-	FW	(Portugal) POR	Futre	34	4	24+2	3	6	1	2	0
-	GK	(Spain) ESP	Mejias	10	-15	5	-11	5	-4	0	0
-	MF	(Spain) ESP	Alfredo	42	4	18+15	3	2+5	1	2	0
-	DF	(Spain) ESP	Patxi Ferreira	27	3	17+4	2	5	1	1	0
-	DF	(Spain) ESP	Pedro	19	0	13+5	0	0+1	0		
-	DF	(Spain) ESP	Pizo Gómez	19	0	13+2	0	2	0	1+1	0
-	FW	(Spain) ESP	Sabas	24	3	8+12	3	0+4	0		
-	DF	(Spain) ESP	Toni Muñoz	17	0	8+3	0	4+1	0	0+1	0
-	MF	(Spain) ESP	Julio Prieto	15	0	4+8	0	0+1	0	1+1	0
-	DF	(Spain) ESP	Carlos Aguilera	4	0	1+3	0				
-	FW	(Brazil) BRA	Baltazar	5	0	1+2	0	0	0	2	0
-	MF	(Spain) ESP	Orejuela	7	0	1+1	0	5	0		
-	DF	(Spain) ESP	Juanma Lopez	1	0	1	0				
-	FW	(Spain) ESP	Alfaro	2	0	0+2	0				
-	GK	(Andorra) AND	Koldo	0	0	0	0				

- Source: https://www.bdfutbol.com/en/t/t1990-917.html

=== Squad statistics ===
Competizione	Punti	Totale						DR
Competizione	Punti	G	V	N	P	Gf	Gs	DR
Primera División	47	38	17	13	8	52	28	+24
Coppa del Re	-	7	4	1	2	9	5	+4
Coppa UEFA	-	2	1	0	1	1	2	-1
Totale	47	47	22	14	11	62	35	+27

=== Top scorers ===
Rank	Position	Player	La Liga	Copa del Rey	UEFA Cup	Total
1	FW	(Spain) Manolo	16	2	0	18
2	FW	(Austria) Gerhard Rodax	9	1	0	10
3	DF	(Spain) Juanito	5	1	1	7
4	MF	(Germany) Bernd Schuster	4	1	0	5
5	MF	(Portugal) Paulo Futre	3	1	0	4
5	MF	(Spain) Alfredo	3	1	0	4
7	MF	(Spain) Juan Vizcaíno	3	0	0	3
7	FW	(Spain) Juan Sabas	3	0	0	3
7	DF	(Spain) Patxi Ferreira	2	1	0	3
10	DF	(Spain) Roberto Solozábal	2	0	0	2
11	DF	(Spain) Tomás Reñones	1	0	0	1
11	DF	(Brazil) Donato	0	1	0	1
Own goals			1	0	0	1
Totals			52	9	1	62
