= 1992 Copa del Rey final =

Copa del Rey 1992 final
- Event: 1991–92 Copa del Rey
Atlético Madrid	Real Madrid
2	0
- Date: 27 June 1992
- Venue: Santiago Bernabéu, Madrid
- Referee: Manuel Díaz Vega
- Attendance: 70,000

The 1992 Copa del Rey final was the 90th final of the Copa del Rey. The final was played at Santiago Bernabéu Stadium in Madrid, on 27 June 1992 after UEFA Euro 1992, being won by Atlético Madrid, who beat Real Madrid 2–0.

== Details ==
27 June 1992
21:00 CET

Atlético Madrid	2–0	Real Madrid
Schuster 7'; Futre 29'	Report (in Spanish)

Santiago Bernabéu, Madrid
Attendance: 70,000
Referee: Manuel Díaz Vega

Atlético Madrid	Real Madrid

Atlético Madrid:
GK	1	(Spain) Abel	(yellow card) 70'
RB	2	(Spain) Tomás
CB	5	(Spain) Juanma López
CB	4	(Spain) Roberto Solozábal
LB	3	(Spain) Miquel Soler	(yellow card) 41'
RM	6	(Brazil) Donato	(yellow card) 85'
CM	8	(Germany) Bernd Schuster	(yellow card) 78'
CM	11	(Spain) Juan Vizcaíno
LM	9	(Spain) Gabriel Moya		(substituted off) 59'
RF	10	(Portugal) Paulo Futre (c)
LF	7	(Spain) Manolo	(yellow card) 41'	(substituted off) 77'
Substitutes:
CB	12	(Spain) Patxi Ferreira
GK	13	(Spain) Diego Díaz
LB	14	(Spain) Toni		(substituted on) 77'
CM	15	(Spain) Alfredo Santaelena		(substituted on) 59'
LF	16	(Spain) Juan Sabas
Manager:
(Spain) Luis Aragonés

Real Madrid:
GK	1	(Spain) Francisco Buyo
RB	2	(Spain) Chendo (c)
CB	5	(Spain) Manolo Sanchís	(yellow card) 12'
CB	4	(Spain) Miguel Tendillo
LB	3	(Spain) Francisco Villaroya		(substituted off) 46'
RM	8	(Spain) Míchel	(yellow card) 18'
CM	11	(Spain) Luis Milla	(yellow card) 79'
CM	6	(Spain) Fernando Hierro	(yellow card) 50'
LM	7	(Spain) Luis Enrique
OM	10	(Romania) Gheorghe Hagi		(substituted off) 82'
FW	9	(Spain) Emilio Butragueño
Substitutes:
LB	12	(Spain) Mikel Lasa
GK	13	(Spain) Pedro Jaro
MF	14	(Spain) Paco Llorente		(substituted on) 46'
FW	15	(Spain) Alfonso		(substituted on) 82'
FW	16	(Spain) Adolfo Aldana
Manager:
(Netherlands) Leo Beenhakker

MATCH RULES

- 90 minutes.
- 30 minutes of extra-time if necessary.
- Penalty shoot-out if scores still level.
- Five named substitutes.
- Maximum of two substitutions.

== See also ==
- Madrid derby
