= 1991–92 Real Madrid CF season =

90th season in existence of Real Madrid CF

Real Madrid C.F.
1991–92 season
- President: Ramón Mendoza
- Head coach: Radomir Antić (until 27 January 1992); Leo Beenhakker
- Stadium: Santiago Bernabéu
- La Liga: 2nd
- Copa del Rey: Runners-up
- UEFA Cup: Semi-finals
- Top goalscorer: League: Fernando Hierro (21); All: Fernando Hierro (26)
Home colours	Away colours

The 1991–92 season was the 61st season for Real Madrid C.F. in La Liga.

== Summary ==
During the summer, President Ramon Mendoza appointed Radomir Antic as head coach for the upcoming season. On 8 October 1991 Mendoza appointed Leo Beenhakker as club manager until 1994.

Real Madrid won no trophies for the second season in a row. Real Madrid lost the league title to Barcelona on the final day of the campaign after a 3–2 defeat against Tenerife. Serbian coach Radomir Antić was suddenly sacked in January despite Real Madrid leading the league in the standings. On 30 April 1992, the club and Mexican striker Hugo Sanchez agreed to end their contract and parted ways after seven years.

Real lost the Copa del Rey final to Atlético Madrid and also exited the 1991-92 UEFA Cup after a loss to Torino.

== Squad ==
Note: Flags indicate national team as defined under FIFA eligibility rules; some limited exceptions apply. Players may hold more than one non-FIFA nationality.

No.	Pos.	Nation	Player
-	GK	ESP	Francisco Buyo
-	GK	ESP	Pedro Luis Jaro
-	DF	ESP	Chendo
-	DF	BRA	Ricardo Rocha
-	DF	ESP	Manuel Sanchís
-	DF	ESP	Francisco Villarroya
-	DF	ESP	Mikel Lasa
-	DF	ESP	Miguel Tendillo
-	MF	ESP	Fernando Hierro
-	MF	ESP	Míchel
-	MF	ESP	Luis Milla

No.	Pos.	Nation	Player
-	MF	ESP	Luis Enrique
-	MF	ROU	Gheorghe Hagi
-	MF	ESP	Paco Llorente
-	MF	ESP	Adolfo Aldana
-	MF	ESP	Rafael Gordillo
-	MF	CRO	Robert Prosinečki
-	MF	ESP	Santiago Aragón
-	MF	ESP	Juan José Maqueda
-	FW	ESP	Emilio Butragueño
-	FW	ESP	Alfonso Pérez
-	FW	MEX	Hugo Sánchez

=== Transfers ===
In
Pos.	Name	from	Type
MF	Robert Prosinečki	Crvena Zvezda	
MF	Luis Enrique	Sporting Gijón	
DF	Ricardo Rocha	São Paulo FC	
DF	Mikel Lasa	Real Sociedad	€1,7 million

Out
Pos.	Name	To	Type
GK	Julen Lopetegui	CD Logroñés	
FW	Losada	Atlético Madrid	
MF	Santiago Aragon	Real Valladolid	
DF	Solana	Real Zaragoza	
DF	Predrag Spasić	CA Osasuna	
FW	Ismael Urzaiz	Albacete Balompié	

== Competitions ==
=== La Liga ===
==== League table ====
Pos	Team	Pld	W	D	L	GF	GA	GD	Pts	Qualification or relegation
1	Barcelona (C)	38	23	9	6	87	37	+50	55	Qualification for the Champions League first round
2	Real Madrid	38	23	8	7	78	32	+46	54	Qualification for the UEFA Cup first round
3	Atlético Madrid	38	24	5	9	67	35	+32	53	Qualification for the Cup Winners' Cup first round (Note: Atlético Madrid qualified for the European Cup Winners' Cup as champions of the Copa del Rey.)
4	Valencia	38	20	7	11	63	42	+21	47	Qualification for the UEFA Cup first round
5	Real Sociedad	38	16	12	10	44	38	+6	44	Qualification for the UEFA Cup first round

Source: BDFútbol
Rules for classification: 1) Points; 2) Head-to-head results; 3) Goal difference; 4) Number of goals scored
(C) Champions

==== Results by round ====
Round	1	2	3	4	5	6	7	8	9	10	11	12	13	14	15	16	17	18	19	20	21	22	23	24	25	26	27	28	29	30	31	32	33	34	35	36	37	38
Ground	A	H	A	H	A	H	H	A	H	A	H	A	H	A	H	A	H	A	H	H	A	H	A	H	A	A	H	A	H	A	H	A	H	A	H	A	H	A
Result	W	W	W	W	W	D	W	W	W	W	W	W	W	D	D	L	W	L	W	D	L	W	L	W	D	L	W	W	W	D	W	D	W	L	W	D	W	L
Position	8	4	3	2	1	2	1	1	1	1	1	1	1	1	1	1	1	1	1	1	1	1	1	1	1	1	1	1	1	1	1	1	1	1	1	1	1	2

Source: Competitive matches
A = Away; H = Home; W = Win; D = Draw; L = Loss; = Leader, 1992–93 UEFA Champions League; = 1992–93 UEFA Cup

==== Matches ====
30 August 1991 1	Cádiz CF	0–1	Real Madrid	Cádiz
		Report	Míchel 30'	Stadium: Estadio Ramon de Carranza; Referee: Rubio Valdivieso

7 September 1991 2	Real Madrid	1–0	Real Valladolid	Madrid
	Aldana 58'	Report		Stadium: Estadio Santiago Bernabéu

13 September 1991 3	Athletic Bilbao	1–4	Real Madrid	Bilbao
	Tabuenca 77'	Report	Butragueño 4', 36'; Hagi 34'; Hierro 89'	Stadium: San Mamés

27 September 1991 4	Real Madrid	3–1	Sevilla FC	Madrid
	Butragueño 36', 43'; Hierro 61'	Report	Conte 62'	Stadium: Estadio Santiago Bernabéu

6 October 1991 5	Sporting Gijón	1–4	Real Madrid	Gijón
	Luhovy 67' (pen.)	Report	Butragueño 16', 24'; Míchel 70'; Hierro 83'	Stadium: El Molinón

19 October 1991 6	Real Madrid	1–1	FC Barcelona	Madrid
	Prosinečki 19'	Report	Koeman 58' (pen.)	Stadium: Estadio Santiago Bernabéu

27 October 1991 7	Real Madrid	3–0	CD Logroñés	Madrid
	Hierro 55', 67'; Enrique 85'	Report		Stadium: Estadio Santiago Bernabéu

1 November 1991 8	Deportivo La Coruña	0–3	Real Madrid	A Coruña
		Report	Hierro 59'; Míchel 80'; Butragueño 89'	Stadium: Estadio Riazor

9 November 1991 9	Real Madrid	2–1	Albacete	Madrid
	Míchel 43' (pen.); Aldana 71'	Report	Zalazar 84' (pen.)	Stadium: Estadio Santiago Bernabéu

16 November 1991 10	Real Burgos	0–2	Real Madrid	Burgos
		Report	Enrique 47'; Hierro 72'	Stadium: Estadio El Plantio

23 November 1991 11	Real Madrid	2–0	RCD Mallorca	Madrid
	Hagi 46'; Alfonso 83'	Report		Stadium: Estadio Santiago Bernabéu

30 November 1991 12	RCD Español	1–5	Real Madrid	Barcelona
	Wuttke 77' (pen.)	Report	Míchel 5'; Hierro 15', 25', 86'; Enrique 65'	Stadium: Sarrià

6 December 1991 13	Real Madrid	4–1	Real Sociedad	Madrid
	Sanchís 36'; Hierro 52'; Villarroya 54'; Hagi 73'	Report	Kodro 80'	Stadium: Estadio Santiago Bernabéu

14 December 1991 14	Real Zaragoza	1–1	Real Madrid	Zaragoza
	Poyet 55'	Report	Alfonso 73'	Stadium: Estadio La Romareda

21 December 1991 15	Real Madrid	0–0	Real Oviedo	Madrid
		Report		Stadium: Estadio Santiago Bernabéu

3 January 1992 16	Atlético Madrid	2–0	Real Madrid	Madrid
	Vizcaíno 1'; Manolo 47'	Report		Stadium: Estadio Vicente Calderón

11 January 1992 17	Real Madrid	5–2	CA Osasuna	Madrid
	Butragueño 10'; Hagi 32', 60'; Maqueda 59'; Pérez 82'	Report	Cholo 42'; Merino 67'	Stadium: Estadio Santiago Bernabéu

17 January 1992 18	Valencia CF	2–1	Real Madrid	Valencia
	Fernando 87'; Roberto 88'	Report	Míchel 70' (pen.)	Stadium: Estadio Mestalla

25 January 1992 19	Real Madrid	2–1	CD Tenerife	Madrid
	Míchel 7', 50' (pen.)	Report	Chano 27'	Stadium: Estadio Santiago Bernabéu

1 February 1992 20	Real Madrid	1–1	Cádiz CF	Madrid
	Poli (42og.)	Report	Arteaga 74'	Stadium: Estadio Santiago Bernabéu

8 February 1992 21	Real Valladolid	2–1	Real Madrid	Valladolid
	Gómez 5'; Alberto 66'	Report	Llorente 65'	Stadium: Estadio Jose Zorrilla

15 February 1992 22	Real Madrid	5–0	Athletic Bilbao	Madrid
	Hagi 22' 51' 55'; Hierro 63'; Hugo Sánchez 75'	Report		Stadium: Estadio Santiago Bernabéu; Referee: Joaquin Urio Velazquez

21 February 1992 23	Sevilla FC	1–0	Real Madrid	Seville
	Rafa Paz 30'	Report		Stadium: Estadio Sánchez Pizjuán; Referee: José Pajares Paz

28 February 1992 24	Real Madrid	1–0	Sporting Gijón	Madrid
	Butragueño 43'	Report		Stadium: Estadio Santiago Bernabéu

6 March 1992 25	FC Barcelona	1–1	Real Madrid	Barcelona
	Koeman 36'	Report	Hierro 66'	Stadium: Camp Nou

13 March 1992 26	CD Logroñés	1–0	Real Madrid	Logroño
	Polster 38'	Report		Stadium: Las Gaunas

22 March 1992 27	Real Madrid	1–0	Deportivo La Coruña	Madrid
	Hugo Sánchez 8'	Report		Stadium: Estadio Santiago Bernabéu

27 March 1992 28	Albacete Balompié	1–3	Real Madrid	Albacete
	Corbalan 89'	Report	Hierro 25'; Hagi 52'; Llorente 80'	Stadium: Estadio Carlos Belmonte

4 April 1992 29	Real Madrid	2–0	Real Burgos	Madrid
	Lasa 11'; Hierro 69'	Report		Stadium: Estadio Santiago Bernabéu

10 April 1992 30	RCD Mallorca	0–0	Real Madrid	Palma
		Report		Stadium: Lluis Sitjar

18 April 1992 31	Real Madrid	7–0	RCD Español	Madrid
	Butragueño 7'; Butragueño 12'; Hierro 42'; Hierro 53'; Hierro 55'; Hierro 59' (pen.); Hagi 65'	Report		Stadium: Estadio Santiago Bernabéu

25 April 1992 32	Real Sociedad	2–2	Real Madrid	San Sebastián
	Meho Kodro 1'; Xavier 74'	Report	Butragueno 17'; Hagi 20'	Stadium: Atotxa

2 May 1992 33	Real Madrid	2–0	Real Zaragoza	Madrid
	Míchel 2' (pen.) 39'	Report		Stadium: Estadio Santiago Bernabéu

8 May 1992 34	Real Oviedo	1–0	Real Madrid	Oviedo
	Lacatus 89'	Report		Stadium: Carlos Tartiere

15 May 1992 35	Real Madrid	3–2	Atlético Madrid	Madrid
	Enrique 20'; Butragueño 69'; Maqueda 76'	Report	Manolo 6'; Aguilera 54'	Stadium: Estadio Santiago Bernabéu

22 May 1992 36	CA Osasuna	1–1	Real Madrid	Pamplona
	Larrainzar 58'	Report	Butragueño 86'	Stadium: Estadio El Sadar

30 May 1992 37	Real Madrid	2–1	Valencia CF	Madrid
	Míchel 41'; Hierro 49'	Report	Roberto 67' (pen.)	Stadium: Estadio Santiago Bernabéu

6 June 1992 38	CD Tenerife	3–2	Real Madrid	Santa Cruz de Tenerife
	Quique Estebaranz 36'; Ricardo Rocha 77' (o.g.); Pier 78' (yellow card) 90' (yellow-red card); Toño (yellow card)	Report	Hierro 8'; Hagi 28'; Villarroya (yellow card) 69' (yellow-red card); Ricardo Rocha (yellow card); Sanchis (yellow card); Michel (yellow card); Alfonso (yellow card)	Stadium: Estadio Heliodoro Rodriguez

=== Copa del Rey ===
==== Round of 16 ====
8 January 1992	Real Madrid	4–0	Burgos CF	Madrid
	Butragueno 12', 35'; Hierro 40'; Enrique 65'			Stadium: Estadio Santiago Bernabéu

22 January 1992	Burgos CF	2–1	Real Madrid	Burgos
	Joseba 58'; Balint 86'		Alfonso 21'	Stadium: Estadio Las Gaunas

==== Quarter-finals ====
6 February 1992	Real Madrid	2–1	Valencia CF	Madrid
	Míchel 18'; Butragueno 22'		Penev 75'	Stadium: Estadio Santiago Bernabéu

25 February 1992	Valencia CF	0–0	Real Madrid	Valencia
				Stadium: Estadio Mestalla

==== Semi-finals ====
13 June 1992	Sporting Gijón	1–2	Real Madrid	Gijón
	Iordanov 11'		Butragueno 22'; Míchel 27'	Stadium: Estadio El Molinon

20 June 1992	Real Madrid	5–2	Sporting Gijón	Madrid
	Míchel 23'; Hierro 36', 90'; Hagi 50'; Sanchis 52'		Monchu 60'; Juanele 67'	Stadium: Estadio Santiago Bernabéu

==== Final ====
27 June 1992	Real Madrid	0–2	Atlético Madrid	Madrid
	Hierro (yellow card) 50'; Sanchis (yellow card) 12'; Michel (yellow card) 18'; Luis Milla (yellow card) 79'	Report	Schuster 7' (yellow card) 78'; Futre 28'; Abel Resino (yellow card) 70'; Soler (yellow card) 41'; Manolo (yellow card) 41'; Donato (yellow card) 85'	Stadium: Estadio Santiago Bernabéu; Attendance: 70,000; Referee: Manuel Diaz Vega

=== UEFA Cup ===
==== First round ====
18 September 1991	Slovan Bratislava (Czechoslovakia)	1–2	(Spain) Real Madrid	Bratislava
	Dubovský 69'	Report	Míchel 13' (pen.); Butragueño 78'

1 October 1991	Real Madrid (Spain)	1–1	(Czechoslovakia) Slovan Bratislava	Madrid
	Alfonso 41'	Report	Lancz 89'	Attendance: 20,000

==== Second round ====
23 October 1991	Utrecht (Netherlands)	1–3	(Spain) Real Madrid	Utrecht
	Smolarek 18'	Report	Prosinečki 44'; Roest 72' (o.g.); Villarroya 80'	Stadium: Stadion Nieuw Galgenwaard; Attendance: 20,000; Referee: Lajos Németh (Hungary)

6 November 1991	Real Madrid (Spain)	1–0	(Netherlands) Utrecht	Madrid
	Hagi 18'	Report		Stadium: Santiago Bernabeu; Attendance: 30,000; Referee: Serge Muhmenthaler (Switzerland)

==== Third round ====
27 November 1991	Neuchâtel Xamax (Switzerland)	1–0	(Spain) Real Madrid	Xamax
	I. Hassan 36'	Report

11 December 1991	Real Madrid (Spain)	4–0	(Switzerland) Neuchâtel Xamax	Madrid
	I. Hassan 47' (o.g.); Hagi 52'; Míchel 65' (pen.); Sanchís 68'	Report		Attendance: 59,000

==== Quarter-finals ====
4 March 1992	Sigma Olomouc (Czechoslovakia)	1–1	(Spain) Real Madrid	Olomouc
	Hapal 26'	Report	Hierro 45'

18 March 1992	Real Madrid (Spain)	1–0	(Czechoslovakia) Sigma Olomouc	Madrid
	Hugo Sánchez 82'	Report		Stadium: Estadio Santiago Bernabéu; Attendance: 50,000

==== Semi-finals ====
1 April 1992	Real Madrid (Spain)	2–1	(Italy) Torino	Madrid
	Hagi 60'; Hierro 65'	Report	Casagrande 58'	Stadium: Santiago Bernabéu Stadium; Attendance: 93,000; Referee: Hubert Forstinger

15 April 1992	Torino (Italy)	2–0	(Spain) Real Madrid	Turin
	Ricardo Rocha 7' (o.g.); Fusi 77'	Report		Stadium: Stadio delle Alpi; Attendance: 64,000; Referee: Bruno Galler

== Statistics ==
=== Squad statistics ===
No.	Pos	Nat	Player	Total		La Liga		UEFA Cup		Copa del Rey	
No.	Pos	Nat	Player	Apps	Goals	Apps	Goals	Apps	Goals	Apps	Goals
	GK	(Spain) ESP	Buyo	49	-40	35	-27	10	-8	4	-5
	DF	(Spain) ESP	Chendo	54	0	37	0	10	0	7	0
	DF	(Brazil) BRA	Ricardo Rocha	48	0	36	0	9	0	3	0
	DF	(Spain) ESP	Sanchís	52	3	37	1	9	1	6	1
	DF	(Spain) ESP	Villarroya	48	2	32+2	1	7	1	6+1	0
	MF	(Romania) ROU	Hagi	50	16	35	12	8+2	3	5	1
	MF	(Spain) ESP	Míchel	54	16	38	11	10	2	6	3
	MF	(Spain) ESP	Hierro	53	25	37	21	9	2	6+1	2
	MF	(Spain) ESP	Luis Milla	50	0	31+5	0	9	0	5	0
	MF	(Spain) ESP	Luis Enrique	41	5	18+11	4	2+4	0	4+2	1
	FW	(Spain) ESP	Butragueño	50	20	34+1	14	9	1	6	5
	GK	(Spain) ESP	Jaro	6	-8	3	-5	0	0	3	-3
	MF	(Spain) ESP	Llorente	27	2	12+6	2	4+1	0	3+1	0
	DF	(Spain) ESP	Lasa	22	1	11+3	1	3	0	3+2	0
	FW	(Mexico) MEX	Hugo Sánchez	10	3	8	2	1	1	1	0
	MF	(Spain) ESP	Maqueda	20	2	5+8	2	2+2	0	2+1	0
	MF	(Croatia) CRO	Prosinečki	5	2	3	1	2	1	-	-
	FW	(Spain) ESP	Alfonso	26	5	2+17	3	2+1	1	2+2	1
	MF	(Spain) ESP	Aldana	15	2	2+9	2	1+1	0	1+1	0
	MF	(Spain) ESP	Gordillo	17	0	2+8	0	3+4	0	-	-
	DF	(Spain) ESP	Tendillo	6	0	0	0	0+2	0	3+1	0
	MF	(Spain) ESP	Aragón	1	0	0	0	0	0	1	0

- Source: https://www.bdfutbol.com/en/t/t1991-922.html
