= Juanma López =

Juanma López may refer to:

- Juanma López (footballer) (born 1969), Spanish footballer
- Juan Manuel López (boxer) (born 1983), Puerto Rican boxer
