= Diego Díaz (Spanish footballer) =

Spanish footballer

Diego
Personal information
- Full name: Diego Díaz Garrido
- Date of birth: 30 December 1968 (age 57)
- Place of birth: Madrid, Spain
- Height: 1.85 m (6 ft 1 in)
- Position: Goalkeeper

Youth career
- 1984–1987: Atlético Madrid

Senior career*
Years	Team	Apps	(Gls)
1987–1990	Atlético Madrileño	72	(0)
1990–1995	Atlético Madrid	56	(0)
1991	→ Sporting Gijón (loan)	5	(0)
1995–1997	Valladolid	0	(0)
1997–1998	Xerez	0	(0)
1998–2000	Toledo	14	(0)
2000–2001	Alcalá		
Total		147	(0)

International career
1985	Spain U16	7	(0)
1989–1990	Spain U21	4	(0)
- * Club domestic league appearances and goals

Diego Díaz Garrido (born 30 December 1968), known simply as Diego, is a Spanish former professional footballer who played as a goalkeeper.

== Club career ==
Mainly a backup throughout his entire career, Madrid-born Diego played mainly for Atlético Madrid. In his late years, he engaged in an interesting battle for first-choice status with veteran Abel Resino but never really broke into the first team, with his main club or any other.

In January 1991, Diego went on a six-month loan at Sporting de Gijón as replacement for the severely injured Juan Carlos Ablanedo; shortly after arriving, he was also sidelined with physical problems. Over the course of seven seasons, he appeared in 61 La Liga games.

== Honours ==
Atlético Madrileño

- Segunda División B: 1988–89

Atlético Madrid

- Copa del Rey: 1991–92
