= Artur Futre =

Portuguese footballer

Personal information
- Full name: Artur Jorge Colaço Futre
- Date of birth: 29 April 1983 (age 43)
- Place of birth: Montijo, Portugal
- Height: 1.74 m (5 ft 9 in)
- Position: Attacking midfielder

Youth career
- 1992–1999: Sporting CP
- 1999–2000: Samouquense
- 2000–2002: Alverca

Senior career*
Years	Team	Apps	(Gls)
2002–2005	Alverca	29	(4)
2005–2007	Benfica	0	(0)
2005–2006	→ Maia (loan)	21	(2)
2006–2007	→ Aves (loan)	13	(3)
2008–2011	Olímpico Montijo	40	(25)
Total		103	(34)

International career
2003	Portugal U20	1	(0)
- * Club domestic league appearances and goals

Artur Jorge Colaço Futre (born 29 April 1983) is a Portuguese former footballer who played as an attacking midfielder.

== Club career ==
Born in Montijo, Setúbal District, Futre spent most of his youth career at Sporting CP, joining their youth system at the age of 9. In 2003–04 he made his Primeira Liga debut, playing 30 minutes for F.C. Alverca in a 0–1 home loss against C.S. Marítimo on 22 August 2003; the Lisbon side had just returned from the Segunda Liga, and would be immediately relegated at the end of the season.

Futre was bought by S.L. Benfica in the summer of 2005, but never played any competitive matches for the club, serving two loans in the process, the first in the second tier with F.C. Maia and the second in the top flight with lowly C.D. Aves, featuring scarcely for the latter team. Subsequently, he chose to retire at only 24, going on to work as a promoter of sporting events.

Futre returned to active in 2008–09 after one year away from the game, moving to local Clube Olímpico do Montijo in the regional championships. Three years later, he retired for good.

== Personal life ==
Futre's uncle, Paulo, also came through Sporting's youth academy, going on to have a professional career, playing for FC Porto and Atlético Madrid as the most notable clubs.
