= Juanito (footballer, born 1965) =

Spanish footballer (born 1965)

Personal information
- Full name: Juan Francisco Rodríguez Herrera
- Date of birth: 10 May 1965 (age 61)
- Place of birth: Santa Cruz de Tenerife, Spain
- Height: 1.83 m (6 ft 0 in)
- Position: Centre-back

Youth career
- UD Güimar

Senior career*
Years	Team	Apps	(Gls)
1984–1987	Las Palmas	100	(4)
1987–1990	Zaragoza	95	(14)
1990–1994	Atlético Madrid	120	(12)
1994–1996	Sevilla	42	(4)
1996–2000	Extremadura	105	(5)
Total		462	(39)

International career
1989–1991	Spain	5	(1)

Managerial career
- 2006–2007: Las Palmas
- * Club domestic league appearances and goals

Juan Francisco Rodríguez Herrera (born 10 May 1965), known as Juanito, is a Spanish former professional footballer who played as a central defender.

== Club career ==
Juanito was born in Santa Cruz de Tenerife, Canary Islands. He made his professional debut in the 1984–85 season with UD Las Palmas, appearing in 30 Segunda División matches en route to a La Liga promotion.

During a 16-year senior career, Juanito amassed totals of 462 games and 39 goals, 385 in the top division alone, scoring in every campaign but two and also representing Real Zaragoza (13 goals for the Aragonese over two seasons, mainly through his main asset, a powerful shot), Atlético Madrid, Sevilla FC and CF Extremadura. With Atlético, he was a relatively important defensive unit as they won back-to-back Copa del Rey tournaments in the early 1990s.

After retiring in 2000, Juanito acted as both chairman and general manager for last club Extremadura. Subsequently, he returned to Las Palmas as director of football but, in late March 2006, was appointed interim coach after the dismissal of Josip Višnjić, with the Canary Islands side eventually returning to the second tier after an absence of two years.

On 14 June 2009, after a further 46 matches as a manager and one full season as sporting director – the team finished in 18th position, just one above the relegation zone – Juanito left Las Palmas.

== International career ==
Juanito made his debut for Spain on 15 November 1989, starting in a 4–0 home win against Hungary for the 1990 FIFA World Cup qualifiers in a match played in Seville. He scored the third goal from a free kick, being eventually overlooked for the squad that contested the final stages in Italy by manager Luis Suárez and earning a total of five caps.

== Honours ==
Las Palmas

- Segunda División: 1984–85

Atlético Madrid

- Copa del Rey: 1990–91, 1991–92
