= Alfredo Santaelena =

Spanish footballer and manager

Personal information
- Full name: Alfredo Santaelena Aguado
- Date of birth: 13 October 1967 (age 59)
- Place of birth: Madrid, Spain
- Height: 1.69 m (5 ft 6 1/2 in)
- Position: Midfielder

Team information
- Current team: Toledo (manager)

Senior career*
Years	Team	Apps	(Gls)
1985–1988	CD Pegaso	101	(14)
1988–1989	Getafe	19	(1)
1989–1993	Atlético Madrid	106	(4)
1993–1997	Deportivo La Coruña	104	(3)
1997–2000	Sevilla	25	(0)
2000–2002	Getafe	24	(0)
2002–2003	Tres Cantos Pegaso		
Total		379	(22)

International career
1990	Spain U21	2	(0)

Managerial career
- 2003–2006: Tres Cantos Pegaso
- 2006–2007: Cobeña
- 2007–2008: Ciempozuelos
- 2009: Eivissa-Ibiza
- 2010: Marbella
- 2010–2011: Alcobendas Sport
- 2011–2012: Atlético Madrid C
- 2012–2014: Atlético Madrid B
- 2016–2018: SS Reyes
- 2020: Alcobendas Sport
- 2020–2022: Internacional Madrid
- 2022–2023: Rayo Majadahonda
- 2023–2024: San Fernando
- 2024–: Toledo
- * Club domestic league appearances and goals

Alfredo Santaelena Aguado (born 13 October 1967), known simply as Alfredo as a player, is a Spanish former professional footballer who played as a midfielder. He is the manager of Tercera Federación club Toledo.

He amassed La Liga totals of 211 games and seven goals over 11 seasons, representing Atlético Madrid, Deportivo and Sevilla in the competition. In 2003, he started working as a coach.

== Playing career ==
Born in Madrid, Alfredo's career professional career began with hometown's Getafe CF in 1988, and he moved the following year to La Liga with neighbours Atlético Madrid; he was personally signed by chairman Jesús Gil after a friendly, going on to experience some of his best years whilst with the team.

On 29 June 1991, Alfredo scored the game's only goal against RCD Mallorca in the final of the Copa del Rey, also appearing in the following year's decisive match, a 2–0 win over Real Madrid. He joined Deportivo de La Coruña in 1993 alongside teammate Donato, and produced roughly the same numbers, although he would be used more regularly.

Brought from the bench in the 1995 domestic cup final against Valencia CF, diminutive Alfredo scored with his head for the final 2–1 victory. He left for Sevilla FC two years later, being rarely used over a three-and-a-half-year spell and finishing his career aged 35, with his first and second clubs.

== Coaching career ==
Santaelena took up coaching immediately after retiring, mainly in the lower leagues. In 2007, he led CD Cobeña – also in Madrid – to Segunda División B for the first time ever, but the club folded soon after.

Starting in 2012, Santaelena spent several years in charge of Atlético's reserve teams. On 10 February 2014, following a third-division loss at CD Sariñena which left the B side in the relegation zone, he was fired, being replaced by Oscar Mena who had also played for them in the 90s.

In November 2016, Santaelena took over UD San Sebastián de los Reyes also in the third tier. He was dismissed on 21 January 2018, and spent more than a year without a club before being appointed at Internacional de Madrid of the same league on 2 July 2020.

Santaelena continued to work in the third division (renamed Primera División RFEF in 2021) in the following years, being in charge of CF Rayo Majadahonda and San Fernando CD. On 29 April 2024, he was sacked by the latter as they were seriously threatened with relegation, and in July he dropped down two levels after taking over Tercera Federación's CD Toledo.

== Managerial statistics ==
As of 2 March 2025

Managerial record by team and tenure
Team	Nat	From	To	Record					Ref
Team	Nat	From	To	G	W	D	L	Win %	Ref
Tres Cantos Pegaso	(Spain)	1 July 2003	30 June 2006	118	51	42	25	43.22	
Cobeña	(Spain)	1 July 2006	30 June 2007	38	10	9	19	26.32	
Ciempozuelos	(Spain)	1 July 2007	30 June 2008	44	25	11	8	56.82	
Eivissa-Ibiza	(Spain)	12 January 2009	30 June 2009	18	3	5	10	16.67	
Marbella	(Spain)	18 January 2010	6 July 2010	17	2	4	11	11.76	
Alcobendas Sport	(Spain)	6 July 2010	30 June 2011	44	23	9	12	52.27	
Atlético Madrid C	(Spain)	1 July 2011	30 June 2012	38	12	12	14	31.58	
Atlético Madrid B	(Spain)	1 July 2012	10 February 2014	63	22	15	26	34.92	
SS Reyes	(Spain)	17 November 2016	21 January 2018	53	18	17	18	33.96	
Alcobendas Sport	(Spain)	16 January 2020	2 July 2020	8	4	2	2	50.00	
Internacional Madrid	(Spain)	2 July 2020	30 June 2022	64	21	19	24	32.81	
Rayo Majadahonda	(Spain)	4 October 2022	11 June 2023	33	12	8	13	36.36	
San Fernando	(Spain)	16 October 2023	29 April 2024	26	7	7	12	26.92	
Toledo	(Spain)	28 June 2024	Present	26	14	4	8	53.85	
Career total				590	224	164	202	37.97	—

== Honours ==
Atlético Madrid

- Copa del Rey: 1990–91, 1991–92

Deportivo

- Copa del Rey: 1994–95
- Supercopa de España: 1995
