= Gabriel Moya (footballer) =

Spanish footballer (born 1966)

Personal information
- Full name: Gabriel Moya Sanz
- Date of birth: 20 March 1966 (age 60)
- Place of birth: Alcalá de Henares, Spain
- Height: 1.75 m (5 ft 9 in)
- Position: Attacking midfielder

Youth career
- Alcalá

Senior career*
Years	Team	Apps	(Gls)
1984–1986	Alcalá	66	(16)
1986–1991	Valladolid	145	(22)
1991–1993	Atlético Madrid	54	(11)
1993–1996	Sevilla	106	(20)
1996–1997	Valencia	35	(7)
1997–1998	Mallorca	23	(3)
1998–2000	Sevilla	43	(4)
2000–2001	Alcalá		
Total		472	(83)

International career
1989–1991	Spain	5	(1)
- * Club domestic league appearances and goals

Gabriel Moya Sanz (born 20 March 1966) is a Spanish former professional footballer who played mostly as an attacking midfielder.

== Club career ==
Moya was born in Alcalá de Henares, Community of Madrid. He appeared in 373 games in La Liga (406 across the two major levels of Spanish football), making his debut aged 20 with Real Valladolid. He then proceeded to represent Atlético Madrid, Sevilla FC – two spells – Valencia CF and RCD Mallorca, always as a very important attacking player.

At the end of the 1999–2000 season, after only ten matches and team relegation with Andalusia's Sevilla, Moya retired from professional football at 34.

== International career ==
During his stint at Valladolid, Moya earned four of his five caps for Spain. The first came on 13 December 1989, in a 2–1 friendly win against Switzerland in Santa Cruz de Tenerife.

Moya scored the only goal for his country on 16 January 1991, closing the 1–1 draw with Portugal in another friendly.

== Honours ==
Atlético Madrid

- Copa del Rey: 1991–92
