= Pedro González (footballer, born 1968) =

Spanish footballer

Personal information
- Full name: Pedro González Martínez
- Date of birth: 18 April 1968 (age 58)
- Place of birth: Villarcayo, Spain
- Height: 1.71 m (5 ft 7 in)
- Positions: Left-back; centre-back

Youth career
- –1987: Villarcayo Nela

Senior career*
Years	Team	Apps	(Gls)
1987–1989	Real Burgos	18	(0)
1989–1990	Logroñés	28	(2)
1990–1994	Atlético Madrid	56	(5)
1994–1996	Sevilla	29	(0)
1996–1997	Alavés	31	(3)
1997–1998	Extremadura	4	(0)
Total		166	(10)

International career
1990	Spain U21	1	(0)
- * Club domestic league appearances and goals

Pedro González Martínez (born 18 April 1968), sometimes known simply as Pedro, is a Spanish retired footballer who played as a left-back, or occasionally a centre-back.

The peak of his career occurred during the 1990s, when he made 113 appearances in La Liga. Most notably, he spent four years with Atlético Madrid, one of Spain's most successful clubs.

== Club career ==
Pedro was born in Villarcayo de Merindad de Castilla la Vieja in the province of Burgos, Castile and León, and turned professional with local club Real Burgos in 1987. After two years with Burgos in Segunda División, he earned a move to La Liga with Logroñés. He made his La Liga debut on 5 November 1989 in a match against Mallorca at Estadio Las Gaunas, in which Logroñés were defeated 1–0 by the visitors. His first goal came on 3 December, scoring the third goal in a 4–1 home win against Tenerife.

Ultimately, he made 28 appearances for Logroñés that season, scoring twice, and his good form earned him a move to Spanish giants Atlético Madrid in the summer of 1990. He made his debut for Los Rojiblancos in their first La Liga game of the season, a 1–1 draw away at Valencia's Mestalla Stadium on 2 September 1990. He had to wait until 23 September to make his home debut, in another 1–1 draw against Tenerife at the Vicente Calderón Stadium. He made 18 appearances in a solid first season with Atleti, but could only manage five the following year. 1992–93 was also a difficult season for Pedro, as he made just 13 appearances. However, this season did include his European debut, as he featured in the home legs of Atlético's first two European Cup Winners' Cup ties: against Slovenia's Maribor on 30 September 1992, and Turkey's Trabzonspor on 3 November. Although the team made it all the way to the semi-finals, Pedro did not feature again.

By far Pedro's best season at Atlético Madrid was his last, the 1993–94 season. He was able to make 32 appearances in all competitions, but also had some success as a goalscorer. Having failed to score in his first three seasons with Atleti, he netted seven times during his final season, with the first coming on 28 September 1993 in a home UEFA Cup match against Scotland's Heart of Midlothian. At the end of the season, former Atleti boss Luis Aragonés signed him for La Liga rivals Sevilla.

He made his Sevilla debut in a home fixture against Sporting de Gijón at the Ramón Sánchez Pizjuán Stadium on 30 October 1994. This turned out to be a very good day for Sevilla, as they secured a 5–1 victory. He made 13 appearances in all competitions in his first season with Sevilla, as the club finished a creditable 5th in the league. He made a further 24 appearances the following season, before leaving the club in the summer of 1996.

Pedro finished his career with two seasons in Segunda División, the first for Deportivo Alavés, and the second with Extremadura. He retired in 1998.

== International career ==
Pedro made a single appearance for Spain's under-21s, which came in the second leg of their 1990 UEFA European Under-21 Championship quarter-final against Italy on 28 March 1990. The match was held at the home stadium of Pedro's then club, Logroñés, and although they won the match 1–0, this was not enough to progress to the semi-finals. Pedro never received a call-up to the senior national team.
