= Míchel (footballer, born 1963) =

Spanish footballer & manager (born 1963)

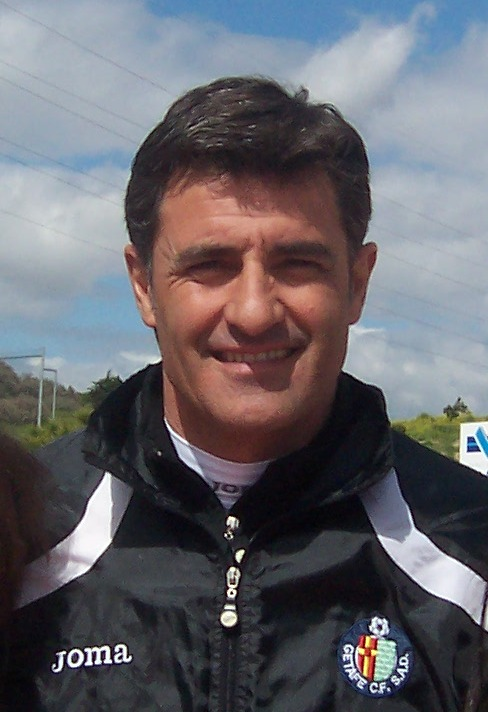
- Míchel as Getafe coach in 2011

Personal information
- Full name: José Miguel González Martín del Campo
- Date of birth: 23 March 1963 (age 63)
- Place of birth: Madrid, Spain
- Height: 1.83 m (6 ft 0 in)
- Position: Midfielder

Youth career
- 1976–1981: Real Madrid

Senior career*
Years	Team	Apps	(Gls)
1981–1984	Castilla	108	(25)
1982–1996	Real Madrid	404	(97)
1996–1997	Celaya	34	(9)
Total		546	(131)

International career
1980	Spain U16	3	(0)
1980–1981	Spain U18	21	(11)
1983–1984	Spain U21	7	(1)
1984	Spain amateur	1	(0)
1985–1992	Spain	66	(21)

Managerial career
- 2005–2006: Rayo Vallecano
- 2006–2007: Real Madrid B
- 2009–2011: Getafe
- 2012–2013: Sevilla
- 2013–2015: Olympiacos
- 2015–2016: Marseille
- 2017–2018: Málaga
- 2019–2020: UNAM
- 2021: Getafe
- 2022–2023: Olympiacos
- 2023–2025: Al-Qadsiah
- * Club domestic league appearances and goals

José Miguel González Martín del Campo, known as Míchel (Spanish pronunciation: [ˈmitʃel]; born 23 March 1963), is a Spanish former professional footballer who played as a right midfielder, currently a manager.

He spent over a decade at Real Madrid, making 561 competitive appearances during his spell while scoring 130 goals. He won several titles with the club, including six La Liga championships and two UEFA Cups.

Míchel earned 66 caps for Spain from 1985 to 1992, and appeared for the nation in two World Cups (scoring four goals in the 1990 edition) and Euro 1988. He started working as a manager in 2005, notably leading Olympiacos to two Super League Greece accolades.

== Club career ==
The son of a footballer who had to retire from the game at 27 after a road accident, Míchel was born in Madrid and joined Real Madrid at the age of 13, his technique and physicality on the pitch quickly standing out. He moved quickly through the ranks to the first team, appearing – and scoring – once in the 1981–82 season, through a penalty in a 2–1 away win over Castellón on 11 April 1982.

A member of the renowned La Quinta del Buitre, which also featured Emilio Butragueño, Miguel Pardeza, Rafael Martín Vázquez and Manolo Sanchís, Míchel never played less than 31 La Liga matches from 1985 to 1994. After helping Castilla to the Segunda División title in 1984, he was instrumental in the capital club's conquests, which included six leagues and two consecutive UEFA Cups; he opened the score in the 1985 final of the latter competition, against Videoton.

In 1989, Míchel announced he would leave Real Madrid after having signed with an Italian side, but this never came to pass and he ended up staying until 1996. In his penultimate season, he suffered a severe knee injury which rendered him unavailable for several months, but still bounced back for a final solid year, after which he left for Atlético Celaya in Mexico – where Butragueño was also playing – shortly after the arrival at Madrid of president Lorenzo Sanz. He retired from football in 1997.

Míchel's career was not without incident: on 14 May 1988, he was hit by a bottle while on the pitch and, three years later, he was sanctioned by UEFA for using an unorthodox method of disrupting the concentration of Carlos Valderrama, in a game against Real Valladolid. The presiding judge in the case noted that "manipulating in public that of your neighbour which is a gift given exclusively to males by nature" violated a federation rule protecting a player's dignity.

== International career ==
Míchel made his debut for the Spain national team on 20 November 1985 against Austria, going on to appear in a further 65 internationals and score 21 goals (only missed a callup due to injury). He played in the 1986 and the 1990 FIFA World Cups, netting a hat-trick against South Korea in Spain's second fixture during the latter tournament (3–1, famously shouting "I've earned this" after his last goal) and also a penalty against Belgium in the country's final group match.

Shortly after Javier Clemente's arrival as national boss, Míchel was deemed surplus to requirements and never called again, although only 29. All national categories comprised, he received exactly 100 caps.

== Style of play ==
Míchel was best known for his stellar crossing ability, also contributing a fair share of goals. He was Real Madrid's all-time leading assist provider for several years.

== Coaching career ==
In the summer of 2005, after working as a sports commentator with RTVE after his retirement (still active, he had already worked in the capacity at the 1994 World Cup) and also writing articles for Madrid's Marca, Míchel was appointed manager of Rayo Vallecano. The following year he returned to his alma mater as director of Real Madrid's sports city, the entire youth system, and manager duties at Real Madrid Castilla, where he coached one of his sons, Adrián; under his management, the side dropped down a level into Segunda División B and he was sacked, also leaving his post in the youth sides due to disagreements with president Ramón Calderón.

On 27 April 2009, Míchel was appointed as coach of top-flight strugglers Getafe until the end of the season. He replaced former Barcelona midfielder Víctor Muñoz, and also managed Adrián, helping the club avoid relegation in the last matchday and renewing his contract for two more years the following week. He was relieved of his duties at the end of 2010–11, with the team again managing to stay afloat after finishing 16th, just one point clear of the relegation zone.

Míchel joined Sevilla on 6 February 2012, replacing the fired Marcelino García Toral and signing until the end of the season. On 14 January of the following year, after a 2–0 away loss to Valencia that left the Andalusians in 12th place, he was relieved of his duties.

Míchel moved to Olympiacos in the Super League Greece on 1 February 2013, on a contract until June 2015. In his first 18 months in charge, he won two national championships and the 2013 Greek Cup. He was fired on 6 January 2015, whilst the side was still competing in the Europa League and only a point behind PAOK in the domestic campaign.

On 19 August 2015, Míchel succeeded Marcelo Bielsa at the helm of Marseille. He was sacked the following 19 April due to concerns over his behaviour, with the team ranking 15th in Ligue 1.

Míchel became Málaga's third manager of the season on 7 March 2017, following Juande Ramos and Marcelo Romero. He signed until 30 June 2018 but, on 13 January of that year, with his team in last position, he was relieved of his duties.

On 20 May 2019, Míchel was appointed at Pumas UNAM of the Mexican Liga MX. He resigned from office on 23 July 2020, due to personal and family issues.

Míchel returned to Getafe on 27 May 2021, replacing Valencia-bound José Bordalás. Having gained just one point from eight games of the season, he was dismissed on 4 October.

On 21 September 2022, Míchel returned to Olympiacos after seven years away, replacing compatriot Carlos Corberán. He resigned on 3 April 2023 following a 2–2 draw with Aris Thessaloniki despite being 2–0 up 20 minutes from time; he had allegedly lost the confidence of the board of directors and supporters due to his difficulties in handling the pressure of mounting a title challenge.

On 27 October 2023, Míchel signed with Saudi First Division League club Al-Qadsiah. He promoted to the Pro League at the end of his first season and, in 2024–25, finished fourth while also reaching the final of the King's Cup.

On 14 December 2025, Míchel left the club by mutual agreement.

== Career statistics ==
=== Club ===
Appearances and goals by club, season and competition
Club	Season	League			Cup		League Cup		Continental		Other		Total	
Club	Season	Division	Apps	Goals	Apps	Goals	Apps	Goals	Apps	Goals	Apps	Goals	Apps	Goals
Castilla	1981–82	Segunda División	36	7	6	1	—		—		—		42	8
Castilla	1982–83	Segunda División	35	5	4	2	4 (Note: Appearances in Copa de la Liga (Segunda División))	1	—		—		43	8
Castilla	1983–84	Segunda División	37	13	9	3	4	0	—		—		50	16
Castilla	Total		108	25	19	6	8	1	—		—		135	32
Real Madrid	1981–82	La Liga	1	1	0	0	—		0	0	—		1	1
Real Madrid	1982–83	La Liga	0	0	0	0	0	0	0	0	0	0	0	0
Real Madrid	1983–84	La Liga	0	0	0	0	0	0	0	0	—		0	0
Real Madrid	1984–85	La Liga	26	2	2	0	6	2	9 (Note: Appearances in UEFA Cup)	3	—		43	7
Real Madrid	1985–86	La Liga	31	7	5	0	0	0	12	2	—		48	9
Real Madrid	1986–87	La Liga	44	5	6	1	—		8 (Note: Appearances in European Cup)	0	—		58	6
Real Madrid	1987–88	La Liga	35	14	7	1	—		8	4	—		50	19
Real Madrid	1988–89	La Liga	36	13	8	1	—		5	0	2 (Note: Appearances in Supercopa de España)	1	51	15
Real Madrid	1989–90	La Liga	37	8	6	0	—		3	2	—		46	10
Real Madrid	1990–91	La Liga	36	8	2	0	—		6	1	2	1	46	10
Real Madrid	1991–92	La Liga	38	11	6	3	—		10	2	—		54	16
Real Madrid	1992–93	La Liga	37	9	6	1	—		8	3	—		51	13
Real Madrid	1993–94	La Liga	37	11	4	1	—		6 (Note: Appearances in European Cup Winners' Cup)	2	4 (Note: Two appearances in Supercopa de España, two appearances in Copa Iberoamericana)	0	51	14
Real Madrid	1994–95	La Liga	13	2	0	0	—		5	0	—		18	2
Real Madrid	1995–96	La Liga	33	6	1	1	—		8 (Note: Appearances in UEFA Champions League)	1	2	0	44	8
Real Madrid	Total		404	97	53	9	6	2	88	20	10	2	561	130
Celaya	1996	Liga MX	17	6										
Celaya	1997	Liga MX	17	3										
Celaya	Total		34	9										
Career total			546	131	72	15	14	3	88	20	10	2	730	171

=== International goals ===
#	Date	Venue	Opponent	Score	Result	Competition
1.	18 December 1985	Luis Casanova, Valencia, Spain	Bulgaria	1–0	2–0	Friendly
2.	12 November 1986	Benito Villamarín, Seville, Spain	Romania	1–0	1–0	Euro 1988 qualifying
3.	14 October 1987	Sánchez Pizjuán, Seville, Spain	Austria	1–0 (pen.)	2–0	Euro 1988 qualifying
4.	18 November 1987	Benito Villamarín, Seville, Spain	Albania	3–0 (pen.)	5–0	Euro 1988 qualifying
5.	11 June 1988	Niedersachsenstadion, Hanover, Germany	Denmark	0–1	2–3	UEFA Euro 1988
6.	14 September 1988	Carlos Tartiere, Oviedo, Spain	Yugoslavia	1–0	1–2	Friendly
7.	21 December 1988	Sánchez Pizjuán, Seville, Spain	Northern Ireland	3–0 (pen.)	4–0	1990 World Cup qualification
8.	22 January 1989	Ta' Qali, Attard, Malta	Malta	0–1 (pen.)	0–2	1990 World Cup qualification
9.	23 March 1989	Benito Villamarín, Seville, Spain	Malta	1–0	4–0	1990 World Cup qualification
10.	23 March 1989	Benito Villamarín, Seville, Spain	Malta	2–0 (pen.)	4–0	1990 World Cup qualification
11.	20 September 1989	Riazor, A Coruña, Spain	Poland	1–0	1–0	Friendly
12.	11 November 1989	Népstadion, Budapest, Hungary	Hungary	0–2	2–2	1990 World Cup qualification
13.	13 December 1989	Heliodoro Rodríguez, Tenerife, Spain	Switzerland	1–0 (pen.)	2–1	Friendly
14.	17 June 1990	Friuli, Udine, Italy	South Korea	1–0	3–1	1990 FIFA World Cup
15.	17 June 1990	Friuli, Udine, Italy	South Korea	2–1	3–1	1990 FIFA World Cup
16.	17 June 1990	Friuli, Udine, Italy	South Korea	3–1	3–1	1990 FIFA World Cup
17.	21 June 1990	Marc'Antonio Bentegodi, Verona, Italy	Belgium	0–1 (pen.)	1–2	1990 FIFA World Cup
18.	12 September 1990	El Molinón, Gijón, Spain	Brazil	3–0	3–0	Friendly
19.	13 November 1991	Sánchez Pizjuán, Seville, Spain	Czechoslovakia	2–1 (pen.)	2–1	Euro 1992 qualifying
20.	22 April 1992	Benito Villamarín, Seville, Spain	Albania	1–0	3–0	1994 World Cup qualification
21.	22 April 1992	Benito Villamarín, Seville, Spain	Albania	2–0 (pen.)	3–0	1994 World Cup qualification

== Managerial statistics ==
As of 28 November 2025

Managerial record by team and tenure
Team	Nat	From	To	Record								Ref
Team	Nat	From	To	G	W	D	L	GF	GA	GD	Win %	Ref
Rayo Vallecano	(Spain)	23 June 2005	16 June 2006	42	18	14	10	52	37	+15	42.86	
Real Madrid B	(Spain)	11 July 2006	18 June 2007	42	13	10	19	55	67	−12	30.95	
Getafe	(Spain)	27 April 2009	8 June 2011	101	39	22	40	136	134	+2	38.61	
Sevilla	(Spain)	6 February 2012	14 January 2013	40	16	7	17	61	54	+7	40.00	
Olympiacos	(Greece)	4 February 2013	6 January 2015	91	65	11	15	201	74	+127	71.43	
Marseille	(France)	19 August 2015	19 April 2016	46	16	18	12	69	55	+14	34.78	
Málaga	(Spain)	7 March 2017	13 January 2018	33	9	5	19	32	48	−16	27.27	
UNAM	(Mexico)	16 May 2019	23 July 2020	34	13	10	11	51	45	+6	38.24	
Getafe	(Spain)	27 May 2021	4 October 2021	8	0	1	7	3	13	−10	0.00	
Olympiacos	(Greece)	20 September 2022	3 April 2023	32	18	10	4	60	24	+36	56.25	
Al-Qadsiah	(Saudi Arabia)	27 October 2023	14 December 2025	78	48	13	17	144	81	+63	61.54	
Total				547	255	121	171	864	632	+232	46.62	—

== Honours ==
=== Player ===
Real Madrid

- La Liga: 1985–86, 1986–87, 1987–88, 1988–89, 1989–90, 1994–95
- Copa del Rey: 1988–89, 1992–93
- Supercopa de España: 1988, 1989, 1990, 1993
- Copa de la Liga: 1985
- UEFA Cup: 1984–85, 1985–86
- Copa Iberoamericana: 1994

Spain Under-21

- UEFA Under-21 European Championship runner-up: 1984

=== Manager ===
Olympiacos

- Super League Greece: 2012–13, 2013–14
- Greek Football Cup: 2012–13

Al-Qadsiah

- Saudi First Division League: 2023–24

=== Individual ===
- La Liga Spanish Player of the Year: 1986
- European Cup top scorer: 1987–88
- FIFA World Cup Bronze Boot: 1990
- Ballon d'Or: 1987 (4th place)
- World XI: 1990

== See also ==
- List of La Liga players (400+ appearances)
- List of Real Madrid CF records and statistics
