= Abel Resino =

Spanish footballer

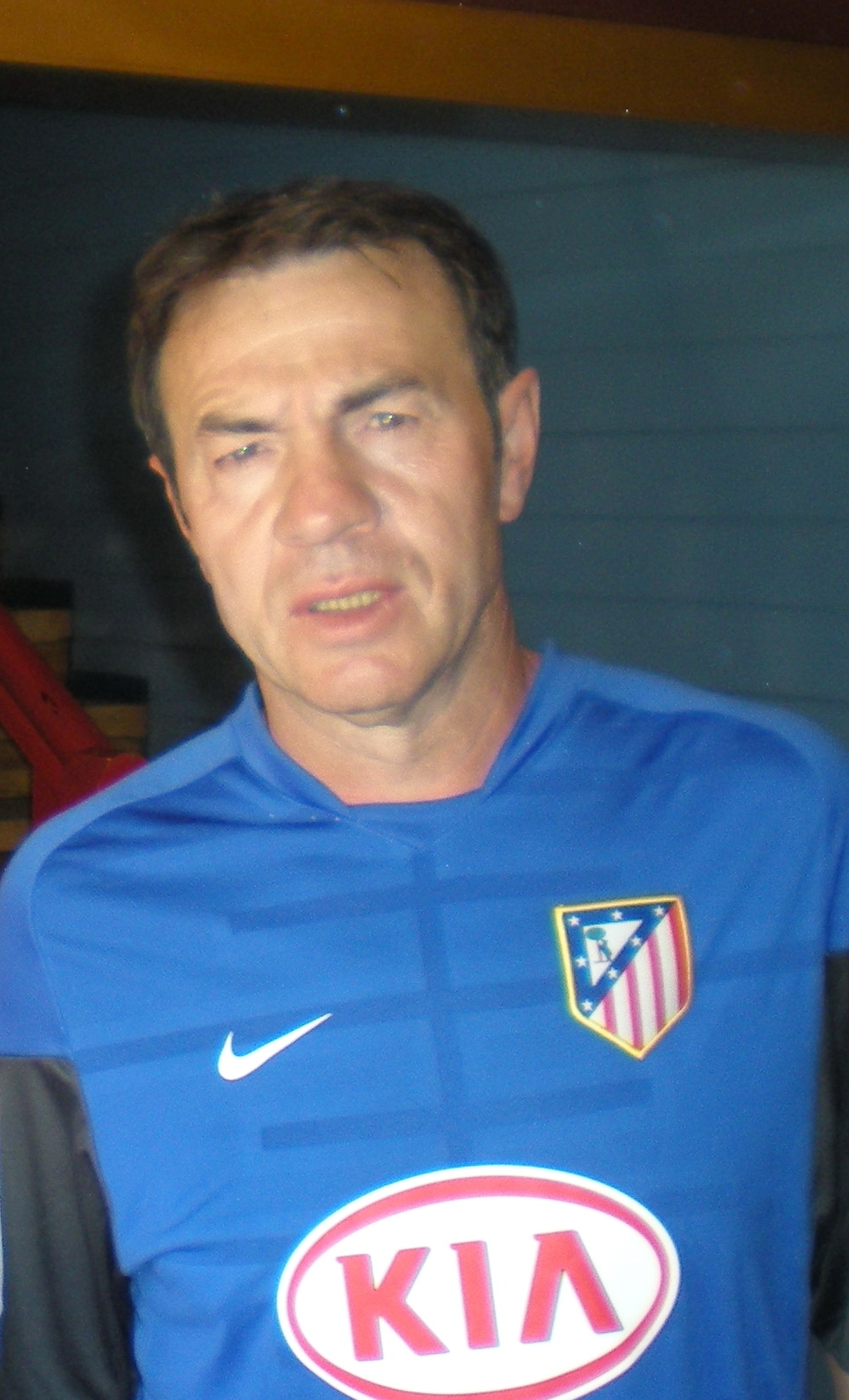
- Abel as a coach at Atlético Madrid

Personal information
- Full name: Abel Resino Gómez
- Date of birth: 2 February 1960 (age 66)
- Place of birth: Velada, Spain
- Height: 1.81 m (5 ft 11 1/2 in)
- Position: Goalkeeper

Youth career
- Toledo

Senior career*
Years	Team	Apps	(Gls)
1979–1980	Toledo		
1980–1982	Ciempozuelos		
1982–1986	Atlético Madrid B	42	(0)
1986–1995	Atlético Madrid	243	(0)
1995–1996	Rayo Vallecano	21	(0)
Total		306+	(0)

International career
1991	Spain	2	(0)

Managerial career
- 2005–2006: Ciudad Murcia
- 2007: Levante
- 2008–2009: Castellón
- 2009: Atlético Madrid
- 2010–2011: Valladolid
- 2012: Granada
- 2013: Celta
- 2015: Granada
- * Club domestic league appearances and goals

Abel Resino Gómez (born 2 February 1960), known simply as Abel as a player, is a Spanish former professional football goalkeeper and manager.

Nicknamed El Gato (The Cat) due to his reflexes, he spent most of his career at Atlético Madrid. For roughly one year, starting in early 2009, he also coached the club, helping it qualify for the Champions League.

Over ten seasons, nine of those with Atlético, Abel appeared in 264 La Liga matches.

== Playing career ==
Born in Velada, Province of Toledo, Abel arrived at Atlético Madrid in 1982 from lowly Ciempozuelos after also having represented the local side, but would have to wait five years (four of those spent with the reserves, only managing to be first-choice in his third season) to become a starter. He went on to make 303 competitive appearances for the club, winning back-to-back Copa del Rey trophies.

Abel held the record for the longest streak without conceding a goal in La Liga at 1,275 minutes, finally being beaten by Luis Enrique of Sporting de Gijón on 19 March 1991. This record was also the European one in a single season until 2009, when Edwin van Der Sar from Manchester United broke it against Fulham.

Leaving Atlético precisely before the team's double conquest in 1995–96, Abel closed out his career at the age of 36 after one season with Madrid neighbours Rayo Vallecano, helping them retain their top-division status. He played two 1991 friendlies for Spain, the first being on 27 March in a 4–2 defeat to Hungary and the second with Romania the following month.

== Coaching career ==
After retiring, Resino returned to Atlético in different periods and capacities (goalkeeper coach, sporting director). He started his head coaching career in 2005, with Segunda División's Ciudad de Murcia, nearly overseeing a top-flight promotion after a fourth-place finish.

Resino's next stop was Levante. Having taken charge midway through the campaign, replacing Juan Ramón López Caro, he helped them to avoid relegation and had his contract renewed; seven games and six losses into the following season, however, he was sacked.

After one and a half solid seasons in the second tier with Castellón, Resino returned to Atlético in February 2009, replacing the departing Javier Aguirre and leading the side to the same place as the previous year thus again qualifying for the UEFA Champions League, and he subsequently agreed to an extension. On 23 October, he was fired following a poor string of results – only one win in the league from seven matches, the culmination being a 4–0 group stage defeat at Chelsea in the Champions League.

In early December 2010, Abel was appointed head coach of Real Valladolid in the second division, replacing the dismissed Antonio Gómez. His first game in charge produced nine goals, a 4–5 home loss against Numancia.

Resino was appointed at Granada on 22 January 2012, taking over from Fabri González after a 3–0 defeat away to Espanyol, fired even though the club was still out of the relegation zone. On 18 February of the following year he returned to active and the top flight, taking the place of Paco Herrera at relegation-threatened side Celta de Vigo.

Resino returned to Granada on 19 January 2015, replacing the dismissed Joaquín Caparrós at the helm of the bottom-placed team. He was relieved of his duties on 1 May, only being able to climb one position in the table.

== Managerial statistics ==
Managerial record by team and tenure
Team	Nat	From	To	Record					Ref.
Team	Nat	From	To	G	W	D	L	Win %	Ref.
Ciudad Murcia	(Spain)	1 July 2005	30 June 2006	44	21	12	11	47.73	
Levante	(Spain)	16 January 2007	7 October 2007	27	6	7	14	22.22	
Castellón	(Spain)	30 June 2008	1 February 2009	26	10	10	6	38.46	
Atlético Madrid	(Spain)	3 February 2009	23 October 2009	31	14	8	9	45.16	
Valladolid	(Spain)	6 December 2010	17 June 2011	29	14	5	10	48.28	
Granada	(Spain)	23 January 2012	6 June 2012	19	7	2	10	36.84	
Celta	(Spain)	18 February 2013	8 June 2013	14	5	2	7	35.71	
Granada	(Spain)	19 January 2015	1 May 2015	15	2	5	8	13.33	
Total				205	79	51	75	38.54	—

== Honours ==
=== Player ===
Atlético Madrid

- Copa del Rey: 1990–91, 1991–92
- Supercopa de España: 1985

Individual

- Ricardo Zamora Trophy: 1990–91
