= Paulo Futre =

Portuguese footballer (born 1966)

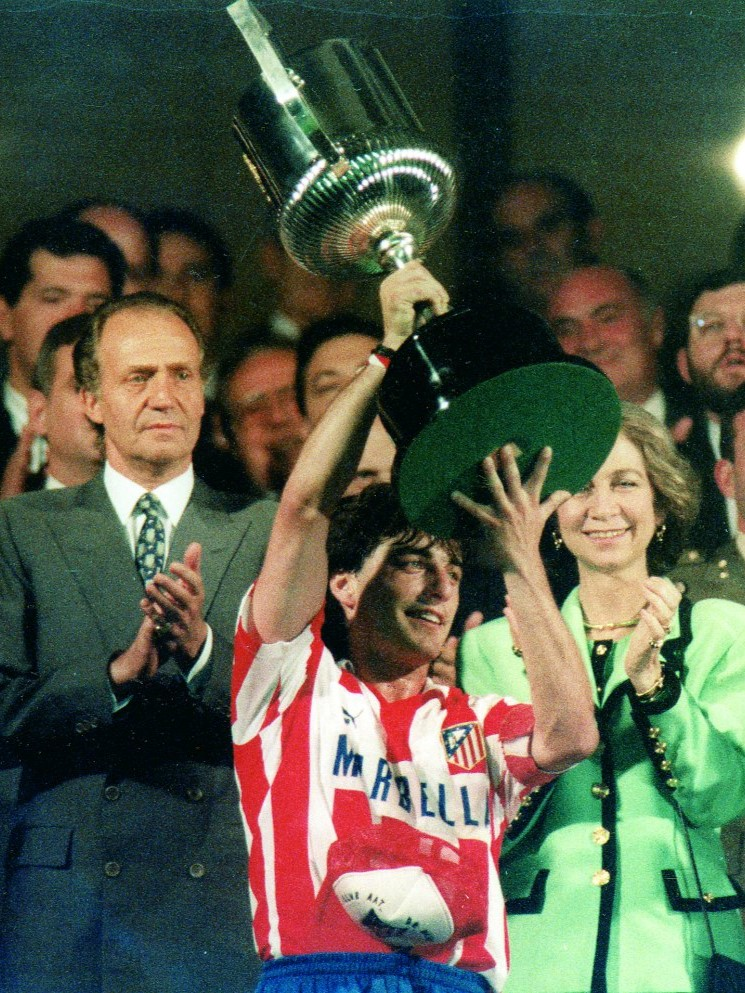
- Futre holding the 1992 Copa del Rey trophy

Personal information
- Full name: Paulo Jorge dos Santos Futre
- Date of birth: 28 February 1966 (age 60)
- Place of birth: Montijo, Portugal
- Height: 1.75 m (5 ft 9 in)
- Position: Winger

Youth career
- 1974–1975: Montijo
- 1975–1983: Sporting CP

Senior career*
Years	Team	Apps	(Gls)
1983–1984	Sporting CP	21	(3)
1984–1987	Porto	81	(23)
1987–1993	Atlético Madrid	163	(38)
1993	Benfica	11	(3)
1993	Marseille	8	(2)
1993–1995	Reggiana	13	(5)
1995–1996	AC Milan	1	(0)
1996–1997	West Ham United	9	(0)
1997–1998	Atlético Madrid	10	(0)
1998	Yokohama Flügels	13	(3)
Total		330	(77)

International career
1981–1983	Portugal U16	19	(6)
1981–1984	Portugal U18	24	(3)
1983	Portugal U21	2	(0)
1983–1995	Portugal	41	(6)
- * Club domestic league appearances and goals

Paulo Jorge dos Santos Futre (Portuguese pronunciation: [ˈpawlu ˈfutɾɨ]; born 28 February 1966) is a Portuguese former professional footballer who played as a left winger.

He started his career with Sporting CP, then moved to Porto – winning the 1987 European Cup – after which he embarked in an extensive professional career, having represented clubs in Spain, France, Italy, England and Japan, most notably Atlético Madrid. He also appeared for Benfica during four months in 1993, and his later years were blighted by injury problems.

A Portuguese international from the age of 17, Futre earned over 40 caps for his country, representing it at the 1986 World Cup.

== Club career ==
=== Sporting CP and Porto ===
Born in Montijo, Setúbal District, Futre first appeared professionally in 1983–84, as a 17-year-old for Sporting CP, whose youth system he had joined at the age of nine. When he requested a pay raise from president João Rocha, he was turned down and left for Porto after just one season, as veterans Jaime Pacheco and António Sousa moved in the opposite direction as part of the deal.

In the following years, Futre collected two Primeira Liga titles, also helping the northerners to the 1986–87 European Cup, putting on a Player of the match performance in the final against Bayern Munich.

=== Atlético Madrid ===
After that continental win, Futre was traded to Atlético Madrid in Spain, earning a reported annual salary of €650,000. At the capital club, he quickly rose to fan favourite status, but his physical weakness left him with several knee injuries which tormented his career in the 1990s.

In his fifth season, Futre provided countless assists for striker Manolo who scored 27 goals for the Pichichi Trophy, with him netting in the campaign's Copa del Rey, a 2–0 win over rivals Real Madrid. During most of his spell with the Colchoneros, he was also team captain.

=== Later years and retirement ===
In January 1993, Futre moved to Porto and Sporting rivals Benfica, winning a Taça de Portugal in his short stay (and scoring in the final against Boavista in a 5–2 victory), as his injury woes persisted. Afterwards, he signed a one-season contract with Marseille, where he teamed up with countryman Rui Barros. His time in France was largely disappointing, however, once again due to continual injuries, as well as competition from Dragan Stojković in his position, which limited him to only two goals in eight league games.

Halfway through 1993–94, despite being linked with AC Milan, Futre eventually transferred to newly promoted Serie A side Reggiana. On his debut, on 21 November 1993, he scored a memorable individual goal which opened the scoring in a 2–0 win over Cremonese and gave the hosts their first ever win in the top flight; during the second half, however, he suffered a serious injury after an aggressive challenge from Alessandro Pedroni, which kept him out for the rest of the season as his team narrowly avoided relegation.

The following campaign, Futre managed only 12 appearances and netted four times, which were not enough to save Reggiana from relegation. He did move to Milan for 1995–96 but, due to continuing injury troubles as well as competition from other talented offensive, creative players in his position, he only featured once for the Fabio Capello-led team, in the final match of the season against Cremonese at the San Siro, which ended 7–1 for the hosts who celebrated the league conquest.

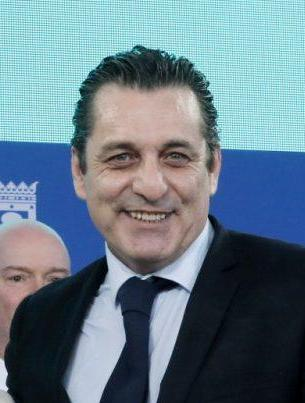
Futre as UEFA ambassador in 2019

After his time in Italy, Futre agreed to a one-year deal with West Ham United, where he infamously refused to play until he was given squad number 10. Finally, he returned to Atlético Madrid (ten La Liga matches in 1997–98), effectively ending his career with J1 League club Yokohama Flügels; he ranked joint-98th in World Soccer's 100 Greatest Players of the 20th century, published in December 1999.

== International career ==
Futre played 41 times for Portugal in a 12-year span, scoring six goals. His debut came against Finland for the UEFA Euro 1984 qualifiers, on 27 April 1983 – he was only 17 years and 204 days old, breaking a national team record.

Futre was a member of the national team that competed in the 1986 FIFA World Cup in Mexico, playing 90 minutes in the 3–1 loss to Morocco in an eventual group-stage exit.

== Style of play ==
A talented left-footed winger whose playing style initially drew comparisons with Diego Maradona, Futre was known in particular for his explosive acceleration as well as his technical ability. His dribbling skills, pace, agility and quick feet enabled him to be fast with the ball at his feet and allowed him to take on several opponents.

Due to his vision and work-rate, Futre was capable both of creating and scoring goals, and was a versatile player who was also deployed as a second striker and as an attacking midfielder on occasion during his time in Italy. Despite the precocious talent he demonstrated in his youth, he was also prone to injuries which greatly affected his career, leading to increasingly inconsistent performances, a poorer goalscoring rate, and a premature retirement at the age of 32.

== Post-playing career ==
Futre worked as director of football at Atlético Madrid from 2000 to 2003, subsequently becoming a real-estate developer in his hometown. In May 2011, he was part of Dias Ferreira's team in an unsuccessful run for Sporting's presidency.

== Personal life ==
Futre's younger son, Fábio, was also a footballer. A midfielder, he played for Atlético Madrid's youth teams, and was called up for Portugal under-17s. His nephew, Artur Futre, appeared professionally for Alverca, Maia and Aves, without much impact; his older son, Paulo, played in a rock band, "Fr1day".

Paulo Sr. was also a television presenter, hosting the TVI 24 late night talk show A Noite do Futrebol.

== Career statistics ==
=== Club ===
Appearances and goals by club, season and competition
Club	Season	League			National cup (Note: Includes the Taça de Portugal, Copa del Rey, Coppa Italia and Emperor's Cup)		League cup (Note: Includes the Coupe de la Ligue, League Cup and J.League Cup)		Europe		Other		Total	
Club	Season	Division	Apps	Goals	Apps	Goals	Apps	Goals	Apps	Goals	Apps	Goals	Apps	Goals
Sporting CP	1983–84	Primeira Divisão	21	3	5	0	—		3 (Note: Appearances in UEFA Cup)	0	—		29	3
Porto	1984–85	Primeira Divisão	30	6	7	2	—		2 (Note: Appearances in UEFA Cup Winners' Cup)	1	4 (Note: Appearances in Supertaça Cândido de Oliveira)	1	43	10
Porto	1985–86	Primeira Divisão	26	7	4	1	—		3 (Note: Appearances in European Cup)	0	2	0	35	8
Porto	1986–87	Primeira Divisão	25	10	4	1	—		9	2	2	2	40	15
Porto	Total		81	23	15	4	—		14	3	8	3	118	33
Atlético Madrid	1987–88	La Liga	35	8	4	1	—		—		—		39	9
Atlético Madrid	1988–89	La Liga	28	5	7	0	—		2	1	—		37	6
Atlético Madrid	1989–90	La Liga	27	10	2	0	—		2	0	—		31	10
Atlético Madrid	1990–91	La Liga	26	3	6	1	—		2	0	—		34	4
Atlético Madrid	1991–92	La Liga	31	6	6	5	—		6	5	0	0	43	16
Atlético Madrid	1992–93	La Liga	16	6	0	0	—		3	1	2 (Note: Appearances in Supercopa de España)	0	21	7
Atlético Madrid	Total		163	38	25	7	—		15	7	2	0	205	52
Benfica	1992–93	Primeira Divisão	11	3	2	2	—		0	0	—		13	5
Marseille	1993–94	Ligue 1	8	2	0	0	0	0	—		—		8	2
Reggiana	1993–94	Serie A	1	1	0	0	—		—		—		1	1
Reggiana	1994–95	Serie A	12	4	1	0	—		—		—		13	4
Reggiana	Total		13	5	1	0	—		—		—		14	5
AC Milan	1995–96	Serie A	1	0	0	0	—		0	0	—		1	0
West Ham United	1996–97	Premier League	9	0	0	0	0	0	—		—		9	0
Atlético Madrid	1997–98	La Liga	10	0	0	0	—		0	0	—		10	0
Yokohama Flügels	1998	J.League	13	3	0	0	3	0	—		—		16	3
Career total			330	77	48	12	3	0	32	10	10	3	423	103

=== International ===
Appearances and goals by national team and year
National team	Year	Apps	Goals
Portugal	1983	1	0
Portugal	1984	4	0
Portugal	1985	4	1
Portugal	1986	4	0
Portugal	1987	2	0
Portugal	1988	1	0
Portugal	1989	4	1
Portugal	1990	1	0
Portugal	1991	8	2
Portugal	1992	3	0
Portugal	1993	8	2
Portugal	1994	0	0
Portugal	1995	1	0
Total		41	6

Scores and results list Portugal's goal tally first, score column indicates score after each Futre goal.

List of international goals scored by Paulo Futre
No.	Date	Venue	Opponent	Score	Result	Competition
1	30 January 1985	Estádio José Alvalade, Lisbon, Portugal	Romania	1–0	2–3	Friendly
2	20 September 1989	Stade de la Maladière, Neuchâtel, Switzerland	Switzerland	1–1	2–1	1990 FIFA World Cup qualification
3	23 January 1991	Olympic Stadium, Athens, Greece	Greece	2–1	2–3	UEFA Euro 1992 qualifying
4	9 February 1991	Ta' Qali National Stadium, Ta' Qali, Malta	Malta	1–0	1–0	UEFA Euro 1992 qualifying
5	28 April 1993	Estádio da Luz, Lisbon, Portugal	Scotland	3–0	5–0	1994 FIFA World Cup qualification
6	10 November 1993	Estádio da Luz, Lisbon, Portugal	Estonia	1–0	3–0	1994 FIFA World Cup qualification

== Honours ==
Porto

- Primeira Liga: 1984–85, 1985–86
- Supertaça Cândido de Oliveira: 1984, 1986
- European Cup: 1986–87

Atlético Madrid

- Copa del Rey: 1990–91, 1991–92

Benfica

- Taça de Portugal: 1992–93

AC Milan

- Serie A: 1995–96

Individual

- Portuguese Footballer of the Year: 1986, 1987
- Ballon d'Or runner-up: 1987
- World Soccer: 100 Greatest Footballers of All Time
