= Juanma López (footballer) =

Spanish footballer

Personal information
- Full name: Juan Manuel López Martínez
- Date of birth: 3 September 1969 (age 57)
- Place of birth: Madrid, Spain
- Height: 1.85 m (6 ft 1 in)
- Position: Centre-back

Youth career
- Atlético Madrid

Senior career*
Years	Team	Apps	(Gls)
1988–1992	Atlético Madrileño	65	(2)
1991–2001	Atlético Madrid	156	(3)
Total		221	(5)

International career
1992	Spain U23	7	(0)
1992–1997	Spain	11	(0)
- * Club domestic league appearances and goals

Olympic medal record

Representing Spain

Men's Football
Gold medal – first place	1992 Barcelona	Team competition

Juan Manuel López Martínez (born 3 September 1969) is a Spanish retired footballer who played mainly as a central defender (occasionally he could operate in the flanks).

López was prone to suspensions, often being considered overaggressive in his approach. Having spent his entire career with Atlético Madrid, he retired after sustaining a serious knee injury.

== Club career ==
López was born in Madrid. During his professional career he played solely for Atlético Madrid, his debut with the first team coming in the dying stages of 1990–91 as he was still registered for the reserves, and would be the following season.

During the 1995–96 campaign, López, often dubbed Super López, formed a solid centre-back partnership with another Atlético graduate, Roberto Solozábal, as the capital club achieved an historic double, with the former appearing in 32 La Liga matches with two goals, in home wins against Real Oviedo (3–0) and Tenerife (3–1).

From 1997 to 2001 (with the last season being played in the Segunda División), however, consistent injuries limited the often considered over-aggressive player to just 12 games, and he eventually retired due to an anterior cruciate ligament ailment from which he never fully recovered.

López subsequently worked as a football agent.

== International career ==
For Spain, López won the gold medal in the 1992 Summer Olympics in Barcelona, and participated at UEFA Euro 1996, receiving 11 full caps in a five-year span. His senior debut came on 9 September 1992 in a friendly 1–0 win against England in Santander, also the first for coach Javier Clemente – both López and Solozábal played the entire match.

== Honours ==
Atlético Madrid

- La Liga: 1995–96
- Copa del Rey: 1991–92, 1995–96

Spain U23

- Summer Olympic Games: 1992

== See also ==
- List of one-club men
