= Félix Sarriugarte =

Spanish footballer

Personal information
- Full name: Félix Sarriugarte Montoya
- Date of birth: 6 November 1964 (age 61)
- Place of birth: Durango, Spain
- Height: 1.74 m (5 ft 8 1/2 in)
- Position: Forward

Youth career
- 1981–1982: Athletic Bilbao

Senior career*
Years	Team	Apps	(Gls)
1982–1986	Bilbao Athletic	102	(28)
1984–1989	Athletic Bilbao	68	(13)
1989–1994	Oviedo	91	(15)
1994–1995	Las Palmas	27	(11)
1995	Barakaldo	5	(2)
1995–1996	Gramenet	11	(3)
Total		304	(72)

Managerial career
- 2000–2003: Athletic Bilbao (youth)
- 2003–2004: Basconia
- 2005–2006: Bilbao Athletic
- 2006: Athletic Bilbao
- 2007–2008: Varea
- 2009: Logroñés
- 2011–2012: Sestao
- 2012–2013: Oviedo
- 2015: Sestao
- 2019–2020: Charlotte Independence (assistant)
- * Club domestic league appearances and goals

Félix Sarriugarte Montoya (born 6 November 1964) is a Spanish former professional footballer who played as a forward, currently a manager.

== Playing career ==
Born in Durango, Biscay, Sarriugarte represented Athletic Bilbao for five seasons – having arrived at the San Mamés Stadium at age 16 – but only started featuring regularly for the first team in 1986–87, following a lengthy spell with the reserves where he scored regularly. He then spent another five years in La Liga with Asturias' Real Oviedo, where he was also never relegated (but totalled only three appearances in his last two seasons).

Sarriugarte retired in 1996 at the age of 31 after playing one season with UD Las Palmas and splitting his last year with local Barakaldo CF and UDA Gramenet, with all the sides competing in the lower leagues. In the top flight, he amassed totals of 159 matches and 28 goals; his debut in the latter competition came on 9 September 1984 in a 3–0 away loss against Sevilla FC, due to a strike from the professional footballers.

== Coaching career ==
Sarriugarte took up coaching in the early 2000s, with the various sides of his first club Athletic. On 8 July 2006, following the dismissal of Javier Clemente, he was appointed first-team manager by president Fernando Lamikiz. Just four months later, however, he was relieved of his duties after a 1–3 home defeat to Sevilla which saw them drop into the 18th position, and eventually again barely avoiding relegation.

In June 2009, Sarriugarte signed at CD Varea – soon to be named UD Logroñés – recently promoted to Segunda División B, but stepped down before the campaign began. On 16 July 2012, after having led Sestao River Club to safety in that level, he joined another team in the same tier, Oviedo; he was fired in March 2013 with his side in third place, and later took the club to court due to unpaid wages, losing his case.

Charlotte Independence announced on 17 January 2019 that Sarriugarte had joined the technical staff of the club as an assistant manager, under Jim McGuinness.
