= Toni Muñoz (footballer, born 1968) =

Spanish footballer (born 1968)

Personal information
- Full name: Antonio Muñoz Gómez
- Date of birth: 4 February 1968 (age 58)
- Place of birth: Córdoba, Spain
- Height: 1.74 m (5 ft 9 in)
- Position: Left-back

Youth career
- AD Naranjo
- Córdoba

Senior career*
Years	Team	Apps	(Gls)
1987–1989	Córdoba	22	(1)
1989–1990	Atlético Madrileño	31	(3)
1990–2001	Atlético Madrid	251	(2)
Total		304	(6)

International career
1992–1993	Spain	10	(2)
- * Club domestic league appearances and goals

Antonio "Toni" Muñoz Gómez (born 4 February 1968), sometimes known as just Toni, is a Spanish former professional footballer who played as a left-back.

Best known for his stint at Atlético Madrid – 243 La Liga games in ten seasons – he also worked with the club in various directorial capacities until 2006.

== Club career ==
Born in Córdoba, Andalusia, Toni moved to the capital with Atlético Madrid following a spell with local Córdoba CF, playing for the reserves in his first year. He spent the 1990–91 season as understudy to Juan Carlos, then made the left-back position his own. In 1995–96, he appeared in 40 La Liga games out of 42 as the Colchoneros won the double.

In June 2001, after a total of only 15 appearances in his last two years as a player, Muñoz retired but stayed connected with his main club, first as a youth coordinator then as director of football. He left the latter position at the end of the 2005–06 campaign, as Atlético failed to qualify for European competition. The following year, he moved to neighbouring Getafe CF as football director.

== International career ==
Toni played ten matches with Spain in one year, as the nation had failed to qualify for UEFA Euro 1992. His debut came on 11 March 1992, in a 2–0 friendly win over the United States in Valladolid.

The following year, on 22 September, Toni scored against Albania in a 5–1 away rout for the 1994 FIFA World Cup qualifiers, in what would be his last cap.

=== International goals ===
Scores and results list Spain's goal tally first, score column indicates score after each Toni goal.

List of international goals scored by Toni
No.	Date	Venue	Opponent	Score	Result	Competition
1	27 January 1993	Insular, Las Palmas, Spain	Mexico	1–1	1–1	Friendly
2	22 September 1993	Qemal Stafa, Tirana, Albania	Albania	2–0	5–1	1994 World Cup qualification

== Honours ==
Atlético Madrid

- La Liga: 1995–96
- Copa del Rey: 1990–91, 1991–92, 1995–96
