= Manolo (footballer, born 1965) =

Spanish footballer (born 1965)

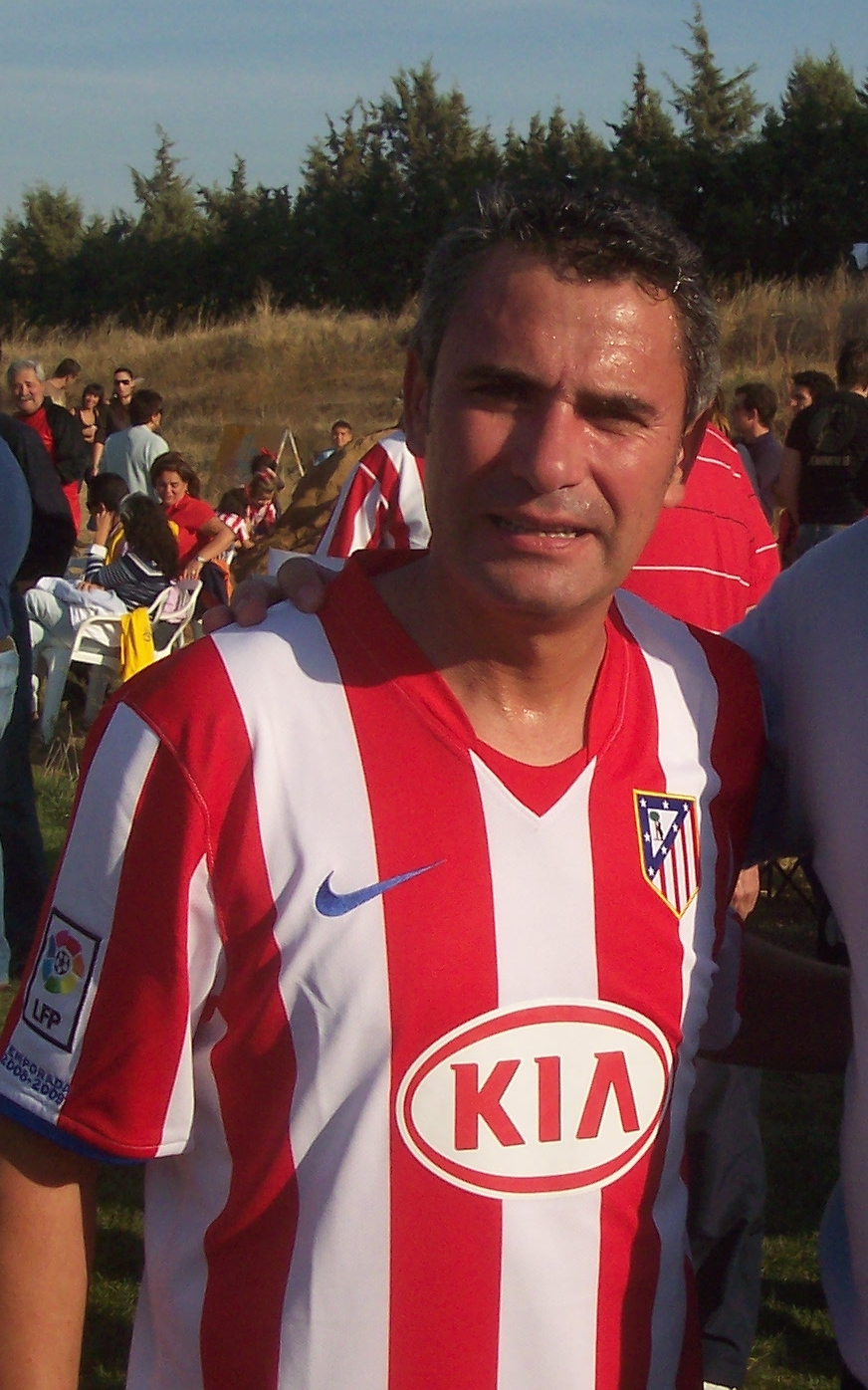

Personal information
- Full name: Manuel Sánchez Delgado
- Date of birth: 17 January 1965 (age 61)
- Place of birth: Cáceres, Spain
- Height: 1.68 m (5 ft 6 in)
- Position: Striker

Youth career
- Diocesano
- Cacereño

Senior career*
| Years | Team | Apps | (Gls) |
| 1982–1983 | Cacereño | | |
| 1983–1985 | Sabadell | 52 | (21) |
| 1985–1988 | Murcia | 107 | (28) |
| 1988–1995 | Atlético Madrid | 219 | (76) |
| 1995–1996 | Mérida | 0 | (0) |
| Total | | 378 | (125) |

International career
| 1982 | Spain U16 | 2 | (0) |
| 1982–1983 | Spain U18 | 12 | (3) |
| 1987 | Spain U23 | 2 | (0) |
| 1988–1992 | Spain | 28 | (9) |

Managerial career
- 2007: Pegaso
- 2008–2009: Rayo Majadahonda
- 2010: Cacereño
- * Club domestic league appearances and goals

Manuel Sánchez Delgado (born 17 January 1965), known as Manolo, is a Spanish former professional footballer who played as a striker.

Over nine seasons, he amassed La Liga totals of 292 matches and 96 goals, mainly with Atlético Madrid with whom he won two major titles. He also competed at that level with Murcia.

Manolo represented Spain at the 1990 World Cup.

== Club career ==
Born in Cáceres, Extremadura, Manolo grew in the ranks of local CP Cacereño, making his senior debut with the club at the age of 17. After two years with CE Sabadell FC, the last in the Segunda División, he moved to Real Murcia CF in the same level, helping it promote to La Liga in the 1985–86 season then scoring 11 goals in 36 appearances the following campaign, with the team retaining their top-flight status.

In summer 1988, Manolo signed with Atlético Madrid, where he knew his most successful years, forming a formidable attacking partnership with Paulo Futre. With many assists from the Portuguese player, he was crowned top scorer in 1991–92 with 27 goals, adding that season's – and the previous – Copa del Rey trophies.

Manolo retired in October 1996 at the age of 31, after half a season with CP Mérida where he failed to appear in any matches due to a serious tibia injury, as he was just four goals shy of 100 in the Spanish top tier. He started coaching in 2007, first with Galáctico Pegaso, going on to spend several years in the lower leagues.

== International career ==
Manolo made his debut for Spain immediately after having been bought by Atlético Madrid, scoring against the Republic of Ireland on 16 November 1988 for the 1990 FIFA World Cup qualification stages. He went on to total 28 caps and nine goals, representing the nation in the finals in Italy where he only appeared in the first group stage game against Uruguay (0–0).

== Career statistics ==
| # | Date | Venue | Opponent | Score | Result | Competition |
|---|---|---|---|---|---|---|
| 1. | 16 November 1988 | Benito Villamarín, Seville, Spain | Republic of Ireland | 1–0 | 2–0 | 1990 World Cup qualification |
| 2. | 8 February 1989 | Windsor Park, Belfast, Northern Ireland | Northern Ireland | 0–2 | 0–2 | 1990 World Cup qualification |
| 3. | 23 March 1989 | Benito Villamarín, Seville, Spain | Malta | 3–0 | 4–0 | 1990 World Cup qualification |
| 4. | 23 March 1989 | Benito Villamarín, Seville, Spain | Malta | 4–0 | 4–0 | 1990 World Cup qualification |
| 5. | 15 November 1989 | Sánchez-Pizjuán, Seville, Spain | Hungary | 1–0 | 4–0 | 1990 World Cup qualification |
| 6. | 21 February 1990 | Rico Pérez, Alicante, Spain | Czechoslovakia | 1–0 | 1–0 | Friendly |
| 7. | 28 March 1990 | La Rosaleda, Málaga, Spain | Austria | 1–0 | 2–3 | Friendly |
| 8. | 27 March 1991 | El Sardinero, Santander, Spain | Hungary | 1–1 | 2–4 | Friendly |
| 9. | 4 September 1991 | Carlos Tartiere, Oviedo, Spain | Uruguay | 2–0 | 2–1 | Friendly |

== Honours ==
Atlético Madrid

- Copa del Rey: 1990–91, 1991–92

Murcia

- Segunda División: 1985–86

Individual

- Pichichi Trophy: 1991–92
