= Juan Vizcaíno =

Spanish footballer

Personal information
- Full name: Juan Vizcaíno Morcillo
- Date of birth: 6 August 1966 (age 60)
- Place of birth: La Pobla de Mafumet, Spain
- Height: 1.81 m (5 ft 11 in)
- Position: Midfielder

Youth career
- 1982–1984: Gimnàstic

Senior career*
Years	Team	Apps	(Gls)
1983–1986	Gimnàstic	71	(8)
1986–1988	Zaragoza B	57	(13)
1988–1990	Zaragoza	86	(10)
1990–1998	Atlético Madrid	255	(22)
1998–2000	Valladolid	55	(1)
2001	Elche	20	(0)
2001–2002	Gimnàstic	26	(0)
Total		570	(54)

International career
1991–1992	Spain	15	(0)

Managerial career
- 2007–2009: Pobla Mafumet (assistant)
- 2011–2018: Atlético Madrid (assistant)
- 2024–2025: Gimnàstic (assistant)
- * Club domestic league appearances and goals

Juan Vizcaíno Morcillo (born 6 August 1966) is a Spanish former professional footballer who played mainly as a defensive midfielder.

He spent the majority of his career with Atlético Madrid. Over 13 seasons in La Liga, he appeared in 396 matches and scored 33 goals, and also represented in the competition Zaragoza and Valladolid.

== Club career ==
Born in La Pobla de Mafumet, Tarragona, Catalonia, Vizcaíno started playing with hometown's Gimnàstic de Tarragona. He was offered his first-team debut by coach Xabier Azkargorta during the 1982–83 season not yet aged 17, with the club in the Segunda División B.

In 1986, Vizcaíno stayed in that level as he moved to Real Zaragoza, initially being assigned to their reserves. He made his La Liga debut against Sevilla FC on 9 March 1988, and remained a regular fixture until the end of his stay with the Aragonese side, while also scoring ten league goals from a defensive position.

Vizcaíno signed with Atlético Madrid for the 1990–91 campaign, starting every game he appeared in in four of his first five years. In 1995–96, he was the outfield player with the most appearances (41 matches, 3,136 minutes and three goals) as the capital-based team conquered the double.

After two more solid years, Vizcaíno left for Real Valladolid, joining Elche CF for the second part of the 2000–01 season and closing out his career at 35 with his first club, Gimnàstic – the latter two in the Segunda División. He stayed in the region afterwards, working for the city hall's sports departments in Pobla de Mafumet.

Vizcaíno returned to Atlético ahead of the 2011–12 campaign, being appointed new manager Gregorio Manzano's assistant. He remained several years at the Vicente Calderón Stadium in the role, under his former teammate Diego Simeone.

On 14 November 2024, Vizcaíno went back to Gimnàstic to become Dani Vidal's assistant coach.

== International career ==
Vizcaíno won 15 caps for the Spain national team, the first arriving on 16 January 1991 in a friendly with Portugal (1–1, in Castellón de la Plana). The nation did not qualify for UEFA Euro 1992, and the player was all but ousted from the call-ups after the arrival of new coach Javier Clemente.

== Career statistics ==
=== International ===
Appearances and goals by national team and year
National team	Year	Apps	Goals
Spain	1991	8	0
Spain	1992	7	0
Total		15	0

== Honours ==
Atlético Madrid

- La Liga: 1995–96
- Copa del Rey: 1990–91, 1991–92, 1995–96
