= 1991–92 Copa del Rey =

90th Copa del Rey

Tournament details
- Country: Spain
- Teams: 84

Final positions
- Champions: Club Atlético de Madrid
- Runners-up: Real Madrid CF

Tournament statistics
- Matches played: 165
- Goals scored: 443 (2.68 per match)
- Top goal scorer(s): Anton Polster; Antonio José Rivera; Eduardo Rodríguez (8 goals each)

The 1991–92 Copa del Rey was the 90th staging of the Spanish Cup.

The competition started on 21 August 1991 and concluded on 27 June 1992 with the Final, held at the Santiago Bernabéu Stadium in Madrid, in which Atlético Madrid lifted the trophy with a 2–0 victory over Real Madrid.

== Fourth round ==
Team 1	Agg.	Team 2	1st leg	2nd leg
CD Lugo	1–5	SD Compostela	1–1	0–4
CD Málaga	2–0	Rayo Vallecano	2–0	0–0
RCD Mallorca	1–3	Deportivo de La Coruña	0–0	1–3
Benidorm CD	3–3 (3–2 p)	UE Lleida	1–1	2–2
Caudal Deportivo	3–5	Real Avilés	2–3	1–2
Orihuela Deportiva CF	3–3 (2–4 p)	CD Logroñés	2–0	1–3
Racing Santander	1–2	Real Sociedad	0–0	1–2
AEC Manlleu	1–4	Real Zaragoza	0–1	1–3
Atlético Marbella	0–2	Real Betis	0–0	0–2
Real Murcia	4–2	UE Figueres	1–0	3–2
CE Sabadell FC	3–6	CD Tenerife	3–1	0–5
SD Eibar	2–4	RCD Español	2–2	0–2
Palamós CF	5–0	UD Las Palmas	3–0	2–0
Tomelloso CF	1–2	CP Mérida	1–1	0–1
Real Valladolid	1–2	Valencia CF	0–1	1–1
Cartagena FC	1–5	Athletic Bilbao	0–1	1–4
CF Gimnástico Alcázar	1–3	CD Castellón	1–1	0–2
CD Estepona	0–4	Real Burgos CF	0–1	0–3
Getafe CF	4–3	Sestao Sport	3–1	1–2

- Bye: Sevilla FC

== Fifth round ==
Team 1	Agg.	Team 2	1st leg	2nd leg
Real Murcia	4–2	Real Aviles	2–2	2–0
Palamós CF	0–6	Athletic Bilbao	0–3	0–3
CD Tenerife	1–2	Valencia CF	1–0	0–2
SD Compostela	1–2	Real Burgos CF	1–0	0–2
Benidorm CD	2–1	CP Mérida	2–1	0–0
Real Sociedad	3–4	CD Logroñés	2–1	1–3
Sevilla CF	4–2	RCD Español	4–1	0–1
CD Málaga	0–1	CD Castellón	0–1	0–0
Getafe CF	1–2	Real Betis	1–0	0–2
Real Zaragoza	2–5	Deportivo de La Coruña	0–2	2–3

== Round of 16 ==
Team 1	Agg.	Team 2	1st leg	2nd leg
Benidorm CD	1–3 (aet)	Sporting Gijón	1–1	0–2
Real Betis	1–4	Athletic Bilbao	1–1	0–3
CD Castellón	3–6	CD Logroñés	2–0	1–6
Real Madrid	5–2	Real Burgos CF	4–0	1–2
CA Osasuna	3–3 (3–5 (p.))	Deportivo La Coruña	3–2	0–1
Real Oviedo	1–5	Atlético Madrid	1–0	0–5
Valencia CF	4–4 (5–4 (p.))	FC Barcelona	2–0	2–4
Real Murcia	1–2	Sevilla FC	1–1	0–1

=== First leg ===
8 January 1992	Benidorm CD	1–1	Sporting Gijón	Benidorm
21:00 CET	Arturo 47' (o.g.)	Report (in Spanish)	Óscar 87'	Stadium: Municipal de Foietes; Referee: Francisco Casajuana Rifà (Catalonia)

8 January 1992	Real Betis	1–1	Athletic Bilbao	Seville
21:30 CET	Bílek 32' (pen.)	Report (in Spanish)	Valverde 78'	Stadium: Benito Villamarín; Attendance: 15,000; Referee: Juan Ansuátegui Roca (Valencian Community)

8 January 1992	CD Castellón	2–0	CD Logroñés	Castellón de la Plana
20:30 CET	Valentín 78'; Guillermo 88'	Report (in Spanish)		Stadium: Nou Estadi Castàlia; Referee: José Luis Carcelén García (Castilla–La Mancha)

8 January 1992	Real Madrid	4–0	Real Burgos CF	Madrid
20:30 CET	Butragueño 12', 35'; Hierro 40'; Luis Enrique 65'	Report (in Spanish)		Stadium: Santiago Bernabéu; Attendance: 50,000; Referee: Severo Javier González Lecue (Basque Country (autonomous community))

8 January 1992	CA Osasuna	3–2	Deportivo La Coruña	Pamplona
20:30 CET	Cholo 12', 69'; Aguilá 73'	Report (in Spanish)	Uralde 10', 22' (pen.)	Stadium: El Sadar; Attendance: 7,000; Referee: Leonardo Esteban Díaz (Asturias)

8 January 1992	Real Oviedo	1–0	Atlético Madrid	Oviedo
21:00 CET	Sarriugarte 16'	Report (in Spanish)		Stadium: Carlos Tartiere; Attendance: 9,342; Referee: Víctor Martínez de la Fuente Iturrarte (Basque Country (autonomous community))

8 January 1992	Real Murcia	1–1	Sevilla FC	Murcia
21:00 CET	Mentxaka 43'	Report (in Spanish)	Salguero 3' (pen.)	Stadium: La Condomina; Referee: José Ángel Paz García (Navarre)

9 January 1992	Valencia CF	2–0	FC Barcelona	Valencia
21:15 CET	Eloy 27'; Penev 69'	Report (in Spanish)		Stadium: Luis Casanova; Attendance: 40,000; Referee: Antonio Martín Navarrete (Andalusia)

=== Second leg ===
22 January 1992	FC Barcelona	4–2 (a.e.t.) (4–5 p)	Valencia CF	Barcelona
20:45 CET	Stoichkov 1'; Laudrup 9', 99'; Nadal 18'	Report (in Spanish)	Penev 45'; Arroyo 119'	Stadium: Camp Nou; Attendance: 30,000; Referee: Raúl García de Loza (Galicia (Spain))
	Penalties
	Koeman (penalty scored); Laudrup (penalty scored); Amor (penalty scored); Nadal (penalty missed); Busquets (penalty scored)		(penalty scored) Penev; (penalty scored) Roberto; (penalty scored) Camarasa; (penalty scored) Leonardo; (penalty scored) Fernando

22 January 1992	Atlético Madrid	5–0	Real Oviedo	Madrid
21:00 CET	Futre 13', 78'; Toni 33'; Moya 40'; Manolo 57'	Report (in Spanish)		Stadium: Vicente Calderón; Attendance: 6,000; Referee: José María Enríquez Negreira (Catalonia)

22 January 1992	Real Burgos CF	2–1	Real Madrid	Burgos
20:30 CET	Joseba Agirre 58'; Balint 86'	Report (in Spanish)	Alfonso 21'	Stadium: El Plantío; Attendance: 3,500; Referee: Jorge Gómez Barril (Galicia (Spain))

22 January 1992	Sporting Gijón	2–0 (a.e.t.)	Benidorm CD	Gijón
20:45 CET	Luhový 97' (pen.); Juanma 100'	Report (in Spanish)		Stadium: El Molinón; Attendance: 10,000; Referee: Luis María Antoñana Moraza (Basque Country (autonomous community))

22 January 1992	Deportivo La Coruña	1–0 (a.e.t.) (5–3 p)	CA Osasuna	A Coruña
21:00 CET	Mújica 3'	Report (in Spanish)		Stadium: Riazor; Referee: José María García-Aranda (Community of Madrid)
	Penalties
	Kiryakov (penalty scored); Fran (penalty scored); Villa (penalty scored); Đukić (penalty scored); Uralde (penalty scored)		(penalty scored) Arozarena; (penalty scored) Larrainzar II; (penalty scored) Urban; (penalty missed) Cholo

22 January 1992	Sevilla FC	1–0	Real Murcia	Seville
21:15 CET	Ramón 55'	Report (in Spanish)		Stadium: Ramón Sánchez Pizjuán; Attendance: 15,000; Referee: Rafael Díaz Agüero (Cantabria)

22 January 1992	Athletic Bilbao	3–0	Real Betis	Bilbao
20:15 CET	Luke 50', 55'; Garitano 69'	Report (in Spanish)		Stadium: San Mamés; Attendance: 15,000; Referee: Manuel Díaz Vega (Asturias)

22 January 1992	CD Logroñés	6–1	CD Castellón	Logroño
20:45 CET	Polster 47', 59' (pen.), 83' (pen.), 88' da Silva 57'; Uribarrena 67'	Report (in Spanish)	Mladenović 58' (pen.)	Stadium: Las Gaunas; Attendance: 8,000; Referee: Antonio Jesús López Nieto (Andalusia)

== Quarter-finals ==
Team 1	Agg.	Team 2	1st leg	2nd leg
Athletic Bilbao	0–4	Atlético Madrid	0–3	0–1
Sevilla FC	1–4	Deportivo La Coruña	0–1	1–3
Sporting Gijón	2–1	CD Logroñés	2–0	0–1
Real Madrid	2–1	Valencia CF	2–1	0–0

=== First leg ===
5 February 1992	Athletic Bilbao	0–3	Atlético Madrid	Bilbao
21:00 CET		Report (in Spanish)	Manolo 18' (pen.); Futre 50', 75'	Stadium: San Mamés; Attendance: 19,000; Referee: José Luis Pajares Paz (Extremadura)

5 February 1992	Sevilla FC	0–1	Deportivo La Coruña	Seville
		Report (in Spanish)	Albístegui 27'	Stadium: Ramón Sánchez Pizjuán; Attendance: 17,000; Referee: Juan Manuel Brito Arceo (Canary Islands)

5 February 1992	Sporting Gijón	2–0	CD Logroñés	Gijón
	Juanele 17' (pen.), 22'	Report (in Spanish)		Stadium: El Molinón; Attendance: 10,000; Referee: Juan Andújar Oliver (Andalusia)

6 February 1992	Real Madrid	2–1	Valencia CF	Madrid
21:00 CET	Míchel 18'; Butragueño 22'	Report (in Spanish)	Penev 75'	Stadium: Santiago Bernabéu; Attendance: 65,000; Referee: Manuel Díaz Vega (Asturias)

=== Second leg ===
25 February 1992	Valencia CF	0–0	Real Madrid	Valencia
21:00 CET		Report (in Spanish)		Stadium: Luis Casanova; Attendance: 55,000; Referee: Joaquín Urío Velázquez (Basque Country (autonomous community))

26 February 1992	Atlético Madrid	1–0	Athletic Bilbao	Madrid
21:00 CET	Vizcaíno 85' (pen.)	Report (in Spanish)		Stadium: Vicente Calderón; Attendance: 3,000; Referee: Bartolomé Riera Morro (Balearic Islands)

26 February 1992	CD Logroñés	1–0	Sporting Gijón	Logroño
20:45 CET	Uribarrena 6'	Report (in Spanish)		Stadium: Las Gaunas; Attendance: 9,000; Referee: Ángel Calvo Córdova (Castile and León)

26 February 1992	Deportivo La Coruña	3–1	Sevilla FC	A Coruña
21:00 CET	Fran 18'; Stojadinović 85'; Kiryakov 87'	Report (in Spanish)	Zamorano 75'	Stadium: Riazor; Referee: José Francisco Pérez Sánchez (Region of Murcia)

== Semi-finals ==
Team 1	Agg.	Team 2	1st leg	2nd leg
Sporting Gijón	3–7	Real Madrid	1–2	2–5
Atlético Madrid	3–1	Deportivo La Coruña	2–0	1–1

=== First leg ===
13 June 1992	Sporting Gijón	1–2	Real Madrid	Gijón
20:00 CET	Yordanov 11'	Report (in Spanish)	Butragueño 22'; Míchel 27'	Stadium: El Molinón; Attendance: 17,000; Referee: Juan Andújar Oliver (Andalusia)

14 June 1992	Atlético Madrid	2–0	Deportivo La Coruña	Madrid
20:00 CET	Manolo 48'; Schuster 70'	Report (in Spanish)		Stadium: Vicente Calderón; Attendance: 18,000; Referee: Ángel Calvo Córdova (Castile and León)

=== Second leg ===
20 June 1992	Deportivo La Coruña	1–1	Atlético Madrid	A Coruña
19:00 CET	Đukić 81' (pen.)	Report (in Spanish)	Manolo 59'	Stadium: Riazor; Attendance: 29,000; Referee: José María Enríquez Negreira (Catalonia)

20 June 1992	Real Madrid	5–2	Sporting Gijón	Madrid
21:00 CET	Míchel 23'; Hierro 36', 90'; Hagi 50'; Sanchís 52'	Report (in Spanish)	Monchu 60'; Juanele 67'	Stadium: Santiago Bernabéu; Attendance: 15,000; Referee: Miguel Ángel Marín López (La Rioja)

== Final ==
27 June 1992
21:00 (CEST)

Atlético de Madrid	2–0	Real Madrid
Schuster 7'; Futre 29'

Estadio Santiago Bernabéu, Madrid
Attendance: 70,000
Referee: Manuel Díaz Vega

Copa del Rey
1991–92 winners
Atlético de Madrid
8th title
