= 1989–90 Atlético Madrid season =

Atlético Madrid
1989–90 season
- President: Jesus Gil
- Head coach: Javier Clemente (until 27 February 1990); Antonio Briones (until 4 March 1990); Joaquín Peiró
- Stadium: Vicente Calderón
- La Liga: 4th (in UEFA Cup)
- Copa del Rey: Round of 16
- UEFA Cup: First round
- Top goalscorer: League: Baltazar (18); All: Baltazar (19)
Home colours	Away colours	Third colours

The 1989–90 season was Atlético Madrid's 49th season since foundation in 1903 and the club's 43th season in La Liga, the top league of Spanish football. Atlético competed in La Liga, Copa del Rey and the UEFA Cup.

== Summary ==
The season is best remembered by the arrival of head coach Javier Clemente who clinched the league trophy as manager with Athletic Bilbao in the 1982-83 and 1983-84 seasons. Therefore, to boost the defensive line, the new manager brought in three basque players: centre-backs Patxi Ferreira, Pizo Gómez and left-back Eugenio Bustingorri. In spite of the side reaching the 2nd spot in the league table, on 27 February 1990 club president Jesus Gil-after disagreements and early cup eliminations- fired Clemente and replaced him with club legend Joaquín Peiró. Nevertheless, the side finished in 4th place.

== Squad ==
Note: Flags indicate national team as defined under FIFA eligibility rules; some limited exceptions apply. Players may hold more than one non-FIFA nationality.

No.	Pos.	Nation	Player
-	GK	ESP	Abel Resino
-	GK	ESP	Agustín Elduayen
-	DF	ESP	Tomás Reñones
-	DF	ESP	Carlos Aguilera
-	DF	ESP	Andoni Goikoetxea
-	DF	ESP	Roberto Solozábal
-	DF	ESP	Sergio Morgado
-	DF	ESP	Patxi Ferreira
-	DF	ESP	Pizo Gómez
-	DF	ESP	Antonio Torrecilla
-	DF	ESP	Juan Carlos
-	DF	ESP	Eugenio Bustingorri

No.	Pos.	Nation	Player
-	MF	BRA	Donato
-	MF	ESP	Alfredo Santaelena
-	MF	ESP	Armando Lucas
-	MF	ESP	Agustín Abadía
-	MF	ESP	Roberto Marina
-	MF	ESP	Antonio Orejuela
-	FW	POR	Paulo Futre
-	FW	BRA	Baltazar
-	FW	ESP	Manolo
-	FW	ESP	Manuel Alfaro

=== Transfers ===
In
Pos.	Name	from	Type
FW	Manuel Alfaro	Atletico Madrileño	
DF	Patxi Ferreira	Athletic Bilbao	
MF	Agustín Abadía	CD Logroñes	
DF	Pizo Gómez	Osasuna	
DF	Eugenio Bustingorri	Osasuna	

Out
Pos.	Name	To	Type
MF	Joaquín Parra	Real Madrid	
MF	Marcos Alonso	CD Logroñes	
FW	Carlos Muñoz	Real Oviedo	
DF	Juan Carlos Arteche		retired
GK	Luis Alberto Islas	CD Logroñes	loan
DF	Luis Garcia Garcia	CD Tenerife	
DF	Sergio Marrero		
MF	Carlos Guerrero		

== Competitions ==
=== La Liga ===
==== League table ====
Pos	Team	Pld	W	D	L	GF	GA	GD	Pts	Qualification or relegation
2	Valencia	38	20	13	5	67	42	+25	53	Qualification for the UEFA Cup first round
3	Barcelona	38	23	5	10	83	39	+44	51	Qualification for the Cup Winners' Cup first round (Note: Barcelona qualified for the European Cup Winners' Cup as champions of the Copa del Rey.)
4	Atlético Madrid	38	20	10	8	55	35	+20	50	Qualification for the UEFA Cup first round
5	Real Sociedad	38	15	14	9	43	35	+8	44	Qualification for the UEFA Cup first round
6	Sevilla	38	18	7	13	64	46	+18	43	Qualification for the UEFA Cup first round

Source: BDFútbol
Rules for classification: 1) Points; 2) Head-to-head results; 3) Goal difference; 4) Number of goals scored

==== Position by round ====
Round	1	2	3	4	5	6	7	8	9	10	11	12	13	14	15	16	17	18	19	20	21	22	23	24	25	26	27	28	29	30	31	32	33	34	35	36	37	38
Ground	H	A	H	A	H	A	H	A	H	A	H	A	H	A	H	A	H	A	H	A	H	A	H	A	H	A	H	A	H	A	H	A	H	A	H	A	H	A
Result	W	W	D	W	D	W	L	L	L	W	D	W	D	D	W	W	W	L	W	D	W	W	L	W	W	W	L	D	D	W	W	W	D	W	L	W	D	L
Position	2	1	3	1	2	1	3	5	11	7	9	3	5	7	6	4	2	4	3	3	3	3	4	3	2	2	2	2	3	2	2	2	2	2	4	3	4	4

Source: www.lfp.es
A = Away; H = Home; W = Win; D = Draw; L = Loss; = Leader, 1990-91 European Cup; = 1990-91 UEFA Cup; = 1990-91 Segunda División

==== Matches ====
2 September 1989 1	Valencia CF	1–3	Atletico Madrid	Valencia
	Fernando 86' (pen.)	Report	29', 63' Futre; 89' Manolo	Stadium: Mestalla; Referee: Andújar Oliver

9 September 1989 2	Atletico Madrid	1–0	Cadiz CF	Madrid
	Futre 45'	Report		Stadium: Vicente Calderón; Referee: Díaz Agüero

17 September 1989 3	CD Malaga	0–0	Atletico Madrid	Malaga
		Report		Stadium: La Rosaleda; Referee: Urizar Azpitarte

23 September 1989 4	Atletico Madrid	1–0	Sevilla FC	Madrid
	Baltazar 85'	Report		Stadium: Vicente Calderón; Referee: Díaz Vega

30 September 1989 5	Athletic Bilbao	1–1	Atletico Madrid	Bilbao
	Alkorta 76'	Report	67' Baltazar	Stadium: San Mamés; Referee: Valdés Sánchez

8 October 1989 6	Atletico Madrid	2–1	Real Zaragoza	Madrid
	Manolo 22'; Futre 86'	Report	90' Higuera	Stadium: Vicente Calderón; Referee: Enríquez Negreira

15 October 1989 7	Real Valladolid	2–0	Atletico Madrid	Valladolid
	Abadía 7' (aut); Moya 54'	Report		Stadium: José Zorrilla; Referee: Martínez de la Fuente

22 October 1989 8	Atletico Madrid	0–1	Osasuna	Madrid
		Report	71' Ziganda	Stadium: Vicente Calderón; Referee: Urío Velázquez

29 October 1989 9	Real Oviedo	3–0	Atletico Madrid	Oviedo
	Bango 30'; Carlos 60'; Sarriugarte 86'	Report		Stadium: Carlos Tartiere; Referee: Pes Pérez

5 November 1989 10	Atletico Madrid	4–1	CD Castellon	Madrid
	Baltazar 26', 88'; Manolo 27', 32'	Report	71' Raúl	Stadium: Vicente Calderón; Referee: Brito Arceo

12 November 1989 11	RCD Mallorca	0–0	Atletico Madrid	Palma
		Report		Stadium: Lluís Sitjar; Referee: López Nieto

18 November 1989 12	Atletico Madrid	1–0	FC Barcelona	Madrid
	Manolo 12'	Report		Stadium: Vicente Calderón; Referee: Urizar Azpitarte

26 November 1989 13	Rayo Vallecano	4–4	Atletico Madrid	Madrid
	Maradona 25'; Berg 41', 64'; Juanito 48' (rig)	Report	3' Ferreira; 15' Futre; 33', 61' (rig) Baltazar	Stadium: Vallecas; Referee: Jiménez Moreno

3 December 1989 14	Atletico Madrid	0–0	Real Sociedad	Madrid
		Report		Stadium: Vicente Calderón; Referee: Marín López

10 December 1989 15	CD Tenerife	2–3	Atletico Madrid	Santa Cruz
	Rommel 35'; Guina 46'	Report	22', 63' Manolo; 42' Alfredo	Stadium: Heliodoro Rodríguez López; Referee: Ansuategui Roca

17 December 1989 16	Atletico Madrid	2–1	Celta Vigo	Madrid
	Baltazar 30'; Manolo 39'	Report	89' Mosquera	Stadium: Vicente Calderón; Referee: Valdés Sánchez

29 December 1989 17	CD Logroñes	0–2	Atletico Madrid	Logroño
		Report	78' Futre; 83' Baltazar	Stadium: Las Gaunas; Referee: Mazorra Freire

6 January 1990 18	Real Madrid	3–1	Atletico Madrid	Madrid
	M. Vázquez 3', 9'; Schuster 75'	Report	50' Bustingorri	Stadium: Santiago Bernabéu; Referee: Enríquez Negreira

14 January 1990 19	Atletico Madrid	3–1	Sporting Gijon	Madrid
	Baltazar 41', 86'; Marina 44'	Report	16' Blanco	Stadium: Vicente Calderón; Referee: Urío Velázquez

21 January 1990 20	Atletico Madrid	1–1	Valencia CF	Madrid
	Marina 64'	Report	74' Eloy	Stadium: Vicente Calderón; Referee: Urizar Azpitarte

28 January 1990 21	Cadiz CF	0–1	Atletico Madrid	Cadiz
		Report	64' Marina	Stadium: Ramón de Carranza; Referee: Taboada Soto

31 January 1990 22	Atletico Madrid	2–0	CD Malaga	Madrid
	Futre 20', 71'	Report		Stadium: Vicente Calderón; Referee: Pérez Sánchez

3 February 1990 23	Sevilla FC	2–1	Atletico Madrid	Sevilla
	Carvajal 35'; Rafa Paz 58'	Report	90' Futre	Stadium: Ramón Sánchez Pizjuán; Referee: Paz García

11 February 1990 24	Atletico Madrid	2–0	Athletic Bilbao	Madrid
	Baltazar 2'; Orejuela 90'	Report		Stadium: Vicente Calderón; Referee: Jiménez Moreno

14 February 1990 25	Real Zaragoza	0–2	Atletico Madrid	Zaragoza
		Report	51' Donato; 62' Marina	Stadium: La Romareda; Referee: Alfonso Álvarez

18 February 1990 26	Atletico Madrid	1–0	Real Valladolid	Madrid
	Baltazar 52'	Report		Stadium: Vicente Calderón; Referee: Vico Díaz

25 February 1990 27	Osasuna	2–1	Atletico Madrid	Pamplona
	Larrainzar 33'; M. Domínguez 44'	Report	90' Manolo	Stadium: El Sadar; Referee: Díaz Vega

4 March 1990 28	Atletico Madrid	1–1	Real Oviedo	Madrid
	Manolo 11'	Report	44' Julià	Stadium: Vicente Calderón; Referee: Merino González

11 March 1990 29	CD Castellon	0–0	Atletico Madrid	Castellón de la Plana
		Report		Stadium: Castalia; Referee: Taboada Soto

18 March 1990 30	Atletico Madrid	2–0	RCD Mallorca	Madrid
	Baltazar 29'; Manolo 75'	Report		Stadium: Vicente Calderón; Referee: Peraita Ibáñez

24 March 1990 31	FC Barcelona	0–2	Atletico Madrid	Barcelona
		Report	38' Orejuela; 68' Baltazar	Stadium: Camp Nou; Referee: Ramos Marcos

1 April 1990 32	Atletico Madrid	2–0	Rayo Vallecano	Madrid
	Baltazar 24', 71'	Report		Stadium: Vicente Calderón; Referee: Ansuategui Roca

7 April 1990 33	Real Sociedad	0–0	Atletico Madrid	San Sebastián
		Report		Stadium: Anoeta

15 April 1990 34	Atletico Madrid	2–0	CD Tenerife	Madrid
	Donato 75'; Baltazar 84'	Report		Stadium: Vicente Calderón; Referee: Calvo Córdova

22 April 1990 35	Celta Vigo	2–0	Atletico Madrid	Vigo
	Mosquera 15'; Julio Prieto 67'	Report		Stadium: Balaídos; Referee: Merino González

25 April 1990 36	Atletico Madrid	3–1	CD Logroñes	Madrid
	Marina 45'; Futre 46'; Orejuela 68'	Report	29' Sarabia	Stadium: Vicente Calderón; Referee: Villena Peña

28 April 1990 37	Atletico Madrid	3–3	Real Madrid	Madrid
	Baltazar 18'; Orejuela 29'; Manolo 41'	Report	37', 90' Hierro; 57' Losada	Stadium: Vicente Calderón; Referee: Mazorra Freire

6 May 1990 38	Sporting Gijon	2–1	Atletico Madrid	Gijón
	Narciso 35' (rig); Celada 64'	Report	78' (aut) Alcázar	Stadium: El Molinón; Referee: Benavente Garasa

=== Copa del Rey ===
==== Round of 16 ====
7 November 1989	Atlético Madrid	0–0	Real Madrid	Madrid
				Stadium: Vicente Calderon; Attendance: 27,000; Referee: Ramos Marcos

29 November 1989	Real Madrid	2–0 (2–0 agg.)	Atlético Madrid	Madrid
	Sánchez 34', 85'			Stadium: Santiago Bernabeu; Referee: Pes Pérez

=== UEFA Cup ===
==== First round ====
13 September 1989 1	Atletico Madrid (Spain)	1–0	(Italy) AC Fiorentina	Madrid
	Baltazar 78'			Stadium: Vicente Calderon; Referee: (West Germany) Aron Schmidhuber

27 September 1989 2	AC Fiorentina (Italy)	1–0 (a.e.t.) (3–1 p)	(Spain) Atletico Madrid	Perugia
	Bustingorri 25' (o.g.)			Stadium: Renato Curi; Referee: (France) Michel Vautrot
	Penalties
	Battistini (penalty scored); Pioli (penalty scored); Sereni (penalty missed); Volpecina (penalty missed); Baggio (penalty scored)		(penalty missed) Futre; (penalty missed) Marina; (penalty scored) Bustingorri; (penalty missed) Manolo

== Statistics ==
=== Players statistics ===
No.	Pos	Nat	Player	Total		La Liga		Copa del Rey		UEFA Cup	
No.	Pos	Nat	Player	Apps	Goals	Apps	Goals	Apps	Goals	Apps	Goals
	GK	(Spain) ESP	Abel Resino	38	-32	34	-29	2	-2	2	-1
	DF	(Spain) ESP	Tomás Reñones	35	0	31	0	2	0	2	0
	DF	(Spain) ESP	Pizo Gómez	39	0	34+1	0	2	0	2	0
	DF	(Spain) ESP	Patxi Ferreira	40	1	36	1	2	0	2	0
	DF	(Spain) ESP	Eugenio Bustingorri	32	1	24+4	1	1+1	0	2	0
	MF	(Brazil) BRA	Donato	38	2	30+4	2	2	0	2	0
	MF	(Spain) ESP	Alfredo Santaelena	36	1	28+5	1	2	0	0+1	0
	MF	(Spain) ESP	Antonio Orejuela	32	4	27+2	4	0+1	0	2	0
	FW	(Portugal) POR	Paulo Futre	31	10	25+2	10	2	0	2	0
	FW	(Brazil) BRA	Baltazar	42	19	30+8	18	2	0	2	1
	FW	(Spain) ESP	Manolo	38	12	31+3	12	2	0	1+1	0
	GK	(Spain) ESP	Agustín Elduayen	4	-6	4	-6	0	0	0	0
	MF	(Spain) ESP	Roberto Marina	34	5	21+10	5	0+1	0	0+2	0
	DF	(Spain) ESP	Juan Carlos	13	0	11+2	0	0	0	0	0
	DF	(Spain) ESP	Sergio Morgado	11	0	10	0	0	0	1	0
-	MF	(Spain) ESP	Agustín Abadía	16	0	9+6	0	1	0	0	0
	DF	(Spain) ESP	Roberto Solozábal	10	0	9+1	0	0	0	0	0
-	MF	(Spain) ESP	Armando Lucas	12	0	8+3	0	1	0	0	0
	DF	(Spain) ESP	Carlos Aguilera	23	0	7+15	0	1	0	0	0
	DF	(Spain) ESP	Andoni Goikoetxea	10	0	7+1	0	0	0	2	0
	DF	(Spain) ESP	Antonio Torrecilla	3	0	2	0	0+1	0	0	0
-	FW	(Spain) ESP	Manuel Alfaro	2	0	0+2	0	0	0	0	0

- Source: https://www.bdfutbol.com/en/t/t1989-907.html
