= 1988–89 Atlético Madrid season =

Atlético Madrid
1988–89 season
- President: Jesus Gil
- Head coach: Maguregui (until 5 October 1988); Antonio Briones (until 9 October 1988); Ron Atkinson (until 15 January 1989); Colin Addison (until 10 June 1989); Antonio Briones
- Stadium: Vicente Calderón
- La Liga: 4th (in UEFA Cup)
- Copa del Rey: Semifinals
- Top goalscorer: League: Baltazar (35); All: Baltazar (41)
Home colours	Away colours	Third colours

The 1988–89 season was Atlético Madrid's 48th season since foundation in 1903 and the club's 42th season in La Liga, the top league of Spanish football. Atlético competed in La Liga, the Copa del Rey and UEFA Cup.

== Summary ==
In his second campaign as club president, Jesus Gil transferred several players out of the team such as Brazilian Midfielder Alemao to SSC Napoli after disagreements with him. Also Forward Julio Salinas moved to FC Barcelona, along with Midfielder Eusebio Sacristán. Meanwhile, new players arrived to the squad such as Brazilian Forward Baltazar, Brazilian Midfielder Donato, young strikers Manolo and Carlos Muñoz. After one year of rumours, the club finally appointed former Manchester United manager Ron Atkinson as its new head coach in October, winning his first game in charge 6–1 against Espanyol. However, President Jesus Gil sacked him after only three months and several disagreements with the British manager, then appointed his assistant manager Colin Addison who was fired in June. In spite of Baltazar clinching the La Liga topscorer trophy after scored 35 goals, the squad finished in a disappointing fourth place.

The club in UEFA Cup was eliminated early after being defeated by FC Groningen on away goals. Also in Copa del Rey the squad after defeated RCD Español and FC Barcelona advanced to the semifinals stage only to lose the two legged series against archrivals Real Madrid.

== Squad ==
Note: Flags indicate national team as defined under FIFA eligibility rules; some limited exceptions apply. Players may hold more than one non-FIFA nationality.

No.	Pos.	Nation	Player
—	GK	ESP	Abel Resino
—	GK	ESP	Agustín Elduayen
—	GK	ARG	Luis Alberto Islas
—	DF	ESP	Tomás Reñones
—	DF	ESP	Carlos Aguilera
—	DF	ESP	Sergio Morgado
—	DF	ESP	Andoni Goikoetxea
—	DF	ESP	Arteche
—	DF	ESP	Roberto Solozábal
—	DF	ESP	Juan Carlos
—	DF	ESP	Alfredo Santaelena
—	DF	ESP	Sergio Marrero
—	MF	ESP	Armando

No.	Pos.	Nation	Player
—	MF	BRA	Donato
—	MF	ESP	Torrecilla
—	MF	ESP	Joaquín Parra
—	MF	ESP	Roberto Marina
—	MF	ESP	Antonio Orejuela
—	MF	ESP	Marcos Alonso
—	MF	ESP	Luis García García
—	MF	ESP	Carlos Guerrero
—	FW	POR	Paulo Futre
—	FW	BRA	Baltazar
—	FW	ESP	Manolo
—	FW	ESP	Carlos Muñoz

=== Transfers ===
In
Pos.	Name	from	Type
MF	Donato	Vasco da Gama	
FW	Baltazar	Celta Vigo	
GK	Luis Alberto Islas	CA Independiente	
FW	Manolo	Real Murcia	
FW	Carlos Muñoz	Real Oviedo	
DF	Torrecilla	Real Valladolid	
MF	Antonio Orejuela	RCD Mallorca	
MF	Luis García García	RCD Mallorca	
DF	Alfredo Santaelena	Getafe	
DF	Sergio Marrero	UD Las Palmas	
MF	Carlos Guerrero	Atlético Madrileño	
DF	Roberto Solozábal	Atlético Madrileño	

Out
Pos.	Name	To	Type
MF	Alemao	SSC Napoli	
FW	Julio Salinas	FC Barcelona	
MF	Eusebio Sacristán	FC Barcelona	
FW	López Ufarte	Real Betis	
MF	Jesus Landaburu		retired
MF	Antonio Rivas	RCD Mallorca	
DF	Julián Romero	Racing Santander	
FW	Pedraza	Racing Santander	
FW	Quique Setien	CD Logroñes	
MF	Quique Ramos		

== Competitions ==
=== La Liga ===
==== League table ====
Pos	Team	Pld	W	D	L	GF	GA	GD	Pts	Qualification or relegation
2	Barcelona	38	23	11	4	80	26	+54	57	Qualification for the Cup Winners' Cup first round (Note: Qualify for Cup Winners' Cup as holders.)
3	Valencia	38	18	13	7	39	26	+13	49	Qualification for the UEFA Cup first round
4	Atlético Madrid	38	19	8	11	69	45	+24	46	Qualification for the UEFA Cup first round
5	Zaragoza	38	15	13	10	48	42	+6	43	Qualification for the UEFA Cup first round
6	Valladolid	38	18	7	13	40	31	+9	43	Qualification for the Cup Winners' Cup first round (Note: Runner-up of Copa del Rey.)

Source: BDFútbol

==== Position by round ====
Round	1	2	3	4	5	6	7	8	9	10	11	12	13	14	15	16	17	18	19	20	21	22	23	24	25	26	27	28	29	30	31	32	33	34	35	36	37	38
Ground	H	A	H	A	H	A	H	A	H	A	H	A	H	A	H	A	H	A	H	A	H	A	H	A	H	A	H	A	H	A	H	A	H	A	H	A	H	A
Result	L	L	L	D	W	W	W	W	W	L	D	W	W	L	W	L	D	W	D	W	D	W	L	L	W	L	W	L	W	D	W	W	D	D	W	L	W	W
Position	17	19	20	20	15	13	9	6	3	6	5	4	4	4	3	5	5	3	3	3	3	3	3	5	4	5	5	5	5	4	4	4	4	4	4	4	4	4

Source: www.lfp.es
A = Away; H = Home; W = Win; D = Draw; L = Loss; = Leader, 1988-89 European Cup; = 1988-89 UEFA Cup; = 1988-89 Segunda División

==== Matches ====
03 September 1988 1	Logroñés	1–0	Atlético Madrid	Logroño
	Cruz 21'			Stadium: Las Gaunas; Referee: Andújar Oliver

11 September 1988 2	Atlético Madrid	0–1	Athletic Bilbao	Madrid
			Garitano 64'	Stadium: Vicente Calderon; Referee: Sánchez Arminio

18 September 1988 3	Sevilla	4–1	Atlético Madrid	Seville
	Francisco 11'; Bengoechea 47'; Polster 54'; Ramón 70'		69' Manolo	Stadium: Sanchez Pizjuan; Referee: Enríquez Negreira

25 September 1988 4	Atlético Madrid	2–2	Oviedo	Madrid
	Donato 63'; Baltazar 82' (pen.)		Hicks 59'; Tomás 71'	Stadium: Vicente Calderon; Referee: Pérez Sánchez

01 October 1988 5	Atlético Madrid	3–0	Cádiz	Madrid
	Baltazar 3'; Baltazar 34'; Baltazar 72'			Stadium: Vicente Calderon; Referee: Díaz Agüero

09 October 1988 6	CD Málaga	1–2	Atlético Madrid	Málaga
	Esteban Vigo 53'		Orejuela 17'; Aguilera 89'	Referee: García de Loza

16 October 1988 7	Atlético Madrid	6–1	Español	Madrid
	Baltazar 25'; Baltazar 59'; Futre 63'; Baltazar 74'; Aguilera 82'; Baltazar 86' (pen.)		40' Pineda	Stadium: Vicente Calderon; Referee: Valdés Sánchez

23 October 1988 8	Elche	1–3	Atlético Madrid	Elche
	Saavedra 46'		Futre 17'; Baltazar 28'; Manolo 89'	Referee: Taboada Soto

29 October 1988 9	Atlético Madrid	2–0	Valencia	Madrid
	Manolo 34'; Baltazar 69'			Stadium: Vicente Calderon; Referee: Calvo Córdova

06 November 1988 10	Osasuna	2–0	Atlético Madrid	Pamplona
			Rípodas 19'; Pizo Gómez 79'	Referee: Pes Pérez

20 November 1988 11	Atlético Madrid	0–0	Sporting de Gijón	Madrid
				Stadium: Vicente Calderon; Referee: Peraita Ibáñez

27 November 1988 12	Real Sociedad	1–2	Atlético Madrid	San Sebastian
	Loinaz 76'		Baltazar 48'; Baltazar 56'	Referee: Brito Arceo

30 November 1988 13	Atlético Madrid	6–2	Betis	Madrid
	Baltazar 37'; Orejuela 41'; Futre 57'; Baltazar 59' (pen.); Futre 85'; Baltazar 89'		Recha 8'; Chano 84'	Stadium: Vicente Calderon; Referee: Ansuategui Roca

03 December 1988 14	Real Madrid	2–1	Atlético Madrid	Madrid
	Julio Llorente 4'; Martín Vázquez 91'		Manolo 13'	Referee: Martín Navarrete

11 December 1988 15	Atlético Madrid	3–1	Zaragoza	Madrid
	Carlos 13'; Baltazar 30'; Baltazar 59' (pen.)		Crespín 56'	Stadium: Vicente Calderon; Referee: López Nieto

31 December 1988 17	Atlético Madrid	1–3	FC Barcelona	Madrid
	Baltazar 21' (pen.)		Robert 53'; Lineker 64'; Bakero 85'	Stadium: Vicente Calderon; Referee: Ramos Marcos

08 January 1989 18	Murcia	1–1	Atlético Madrid	Murcia
	Salvador Mejías 80'		Tomás 74'	Referee: Urío Velázquez

11 January 1989 16	Valladolid	0–1	Atlético Madrid	Valladolid
			Donato 14'	Referee: Alfonso Álvarez

15 January 1989 19	Atlético Madrid	0–0	Celta de Vigo	Madrid
				Stadium: Vicente Calderon; Referee: Riera Morro

29 January 1989 20	Atlético Madrid	2–0	Logroñés	Madrid
	Manolo 31'; Baltazar 44'			Stadium: Vicente Calderon; Referee: Merino González

11 February 1989 21	Athletic Bilbao	1–1	Atlético Madrid	Bilbao
	Uralde 16'		Baltazar 9'	Referee: Andújar Oliver

19 February 1989 22	Atlético Madrid	2–0	Sevilla	Madrid
				Stadium: Vicente Calderon

25 February 1989 23	Real Oviedo	5–2	Atlético Madrid	Oviedo
	De la Torre 14'; Hicks 67'; Vargas 79'; Tomás 81'; Julià 89'		Baltazar 4'; Manolo 88'	Referee: Socorro González

05 March 1989 24	Cádiz CF	2–0	Atlético Madrid	Cádiz
	Manolito 50'; Mágico González 79'			Referee: Brito Arceo

12 March 1989 25	Atlético Madrid	3–0	CD Málaga	Madrid
	Baltazar 16'; Jaime Molina 22' (o.g.); Futre 24'			Stadium: Vicente Calderon; Referee: Taboada Soto

26 March 1989 26	Español	1–0	Atlético Madrid	Barcelona
	Pineda 73'			Referee: Merino González

02 April 1989 27	Atlético Madrid	3–1	Elche	Madrid
	Marina 2'; Donato 18'; Carlos 80'		Bračun 54'	Stadium: Vicente Calderon; Referee: Benavente Garasa

08 April 1989 28	Valencia	1–0	Atlético Madrid	Valencia
	Giner 67'			Referee: López Nieto

16 April 1989 29	Atlético Madrid	4–1	Osasuna	Madrid
	Manolo 13'; Baltazar 23' (pen.); Baltazar 69'; Orejuela 76'		Rípodas 84'	Stadium: Vicente Calderon; Referee: Valdés Sánchez

30 April 1989 30	Sporting de Gijón	2–2	Atlético Madrid	Gijon
	Joaquín 55' (pen.); Emilio 59'		Baltazar 10'; Carlos 30'	Referee: Urizar Azpitarte

07 May 1989 31	Atlético Madrid	3–0	Real Sociedad	Madrid
	Carlos 36'; Baltazar 67'; Baltazar 84'			Stadium: Vicente Calderon; Referee: Jiménez Moreno

13 May 1989 32	Betis	0–1	Atlético Madrid	Seville
			Aguilera 81'	Referee: Díaz Vega

20 May 1989 33	Atlético Madrid	3–3	Real Madrid	Madrid
	Baltazar 28'; Baltazar 30'; Baltazar 84'		Schuster 46'; Butragueño 72'; Losada 75'	Stadium: Vicente Calderon; Referee: Merino González

28 May 1989 34	Zaragoza	0–0	Atlético Madrid	Zaragoza
				Referee: García de Loza

03 June 1989 35	Atlético Madrid	3–2	Valladolid	Madrid
	Albesa 12' (o.g.); Orejuela 25'; Manolo 88'		Gonzalo 65'; Fonseca 89'	Stadium: Vicente Calderon; Referee: Marín López

10 June 1989 36	FC Barcelona	3–0	Atlético Madrid	Barcelona
	Robert 40'; Begiristain 52'; Julio Salinas 63'			Referee: Ramos Marcos

17 June 1989 37	Atlético Madrid	3–0	Murcia	Madrid
	Manolo 35'; Baltazar 37'; Donato 75'			Stadium: Vicente Calderon; Referee: Brito Arceo

24 June 1989 38	Celta de Vigo	0–3	Atlético Madrid	Vigo
			Baltazar 41'; Aguilera 82'; Baltazar 89'	Referee: Urío Velázquez

=== Copa del Rey ===
==== Eightfinals ====
16 February 1989	RCD Español	0–0	Atlético Madrid	Barcelona
		Report (in Spanish)		Stadium: Sarrià; Attendance: 15,000; Referee: Urízar Azpitarte (Basque Country (autonomous community))

22 February 1989	Atlético Madrid	3–0	RCD Español	Madrid
	Manolo 15'; Marina 58'; Tomás 89'	Report (in Spanish)		Stadium: Vicente Calderón Stadium; Attendance: 18,000; Referee: Urizar Azpitarte (Basque Country (autonomous community))

==== Quarterfinals ====
29 March 1989	FC Barcelona	3–3	Atlético Madrid	Barcelona
	Julio Alberto 30'; Roberto 53'; Julio Salinas 86'	Report (in Spanish)	Baltazar 36', 48' (pen.), 66'	Stadium: Camp Nou; Attendance: 32,000; Referee: Urío Velázquez (Basque Country (autonomous community))

12 April 1989	Atlético Madrid	4–0	FC Barcelona	Madrid
	Donato 6'; Baltazar 53' (pen.), 69'; Manolo 84'	Report (in Spanish)		Stadium: Vicente Calderón Stadium; Attendance: 45,000; Referee: Urío Velázquez (Basque Country (autonomous community))

==== Semifinals ====
7 June 1989	Atlético Madrid	0–2	Real Madrid	Madrid
		Report (in Spanish)	Butragueño 54'; Schuster 73'	Stadium: Vicente Calderon; Attendance: 50,000; Referee: Raúl García de Loza (Galicia (Spain))

21 June 1989	Real Madrid	1–0	Atlético Madrid	Madrid
	Butragueño 68'	Report (in Spanish)		Stadium: Santiago Bernabeu; Attendance: 55,000; Referee: Raúl García de Loza (Galicia (Spain))

=== UEFA Cup ===
==== First round ====
7 September 1988	Groningen (Netherlands)	1–0	(Spain) Atlético Madrid	Groningen
	Groeleken 41'			Stadium: Stadion Oosterpark; Attendance: 19,000; Referee: Lajos Németh (Hungary)

5 October 1988	Atlético Madrid (Spain)	2–1 (2-2a agg.)	(Netherlands) Groningen	Madrid
	Baltazar 4' (pen.); Futre 48'		Ten Caat 20'	Stadium: Estadio Vicente Calderón; Attendance: 35,000; Referee: Klaus Peschel (East Germany)

== Statistics ==
=== Players statistics ===
No.	Pos	Nat	Player	Total		La Liga		UEFA Cup		Copa del Rey	
No.	Pos	Nat	Player	Apps	Goals	Apps	Goals	Apps	Goals	Apps	Goals
	GK	(Spain) ESP	Abel Resino	46	-50	37	-42	2	-2	7	-6
	DF	(Spain) ESP	Tomás Reñones	47	2	37	1	2	0	8	1
	DF	(Spain) ESP	Sergio Morgado	45	0	35	0	2	0	8	0
	DF	(Spain) ESP	Antonio Torrecilla	25	0	17+5	0	0	0	3	0
	DF	(Spain) ESP	Juan Carlos	35	0	27	0	0	0	7+1	0
	MF	(Brazil) BRA	Donato	45	6	37	4	0	0	8	2
	MF	(Spain) ESP	Antonio Orejuela	38	4	30+2	4	1	0	4+1	0
	MF	(Spain) ESP	Roberto Marina	35	2	24+3	1	2	0	6	1
	FW	(Brazil) BRA	Baltazar	46	42	36	35	2	1	8	6
	FW	(Spain) ESP	Manolo	44	12	35	9	1+1	0	7	3
	FW	(Portugal) POR	Paulo Futre	37	6	27+1	5	2	1	7	0
	GK	(Spain) ESP	Agustín Elduayen	1	-3	1	-3	0	0		
	MF	(Spain) ESP	Armando	26	0	16+4	0	2	0	4	0
	DF	(Spain) ESP	Luis García García	18	0	15+2	0	1	0		
	FW	(Spain) ESP	Carlos Muñoz	28	4	9+12	4	1+1	0	0+5	0
	DF	(Spain) ESP	Andoni Goikoetxea	22	0	14	0	0	0	8	0
	MF	(Spain) ESP	Joaquín Parra	18	0	7+7	0	2	0	1+1	0
	DF	(Spain) ESP	Carlos Aguilera	27	4	4+17	4	1+1	0	1+3	0
	MF	(Spain) ESP	Alfredo Santaelena	9	0	4+5	0				
	DF	(Spain) ESP	Sergio Marrero	5	0	3+1	0	1	0		
	DF	(Spain) ESP	Arteche	2	0	2	0				
	MF	(Spain) ESP	Marcos Alonso	3	0	1+2	0				
	GK	(Spain) ESP	Ángel Mejías	1	0	0	0	0	0	1	0
	GK	(Argentina) ARG	Luis Alberto Islas	0	0	0	0				
	DF	(Spain) ESP	Roberto Solozábal	0	0	0	0				
	MF	(Spain) ESP	Carlos Guerrero	0	0	0	0				
