= 1987–88 Atlético Madrid season =

Atlético Madrid
1987–88 season
- President: Jesus Gil
- Head coach: Cesar Luis Menotti (until 20 March 1988); José Ufarte (until 10 April 1988); Antonio Briones
- Stadium: Vicente Calderón
- La Liga: 3rd (in UEFA Cup)
- Copa del Rey: Quarterfinals
- Top goalscorer: League: Julio Salinas (16); All: Julio Salinas (18)
Home colours	Away colours	Third colours

The 1987–88 season was Atlético Madrid's 47th season since foundation in 1903 and the club's 41st season in La Liga, the top league of Spanish football. Atlético competed in La Liga, and the Copa del Rey.

== Summary ==
During summer of 1987, Construction Businessman Jesus Gil was elected club president and his first signing was that of 21-year-old Portuguese winger Paulo Futre. Forward Julio Salinas moved from Athletic Bilbao, and he found the net at an impressive rate (this included a brace on 7 February 1988 in a 7–0 home thrashing of RCD Mallorca). Also, Gil appointed a new coach being his choice Cesar Luis Menotti. He won 4–0 away at Real Madrid in the Madrid derby on 7 November. After 23 games of the season, Atlético were second to Real Madrid, but went on a six-game winless run culminating in a 3–1 home loss to their city rivals on 20 March 1988. Chairman Jesús Gil had already had talks with Menotti – including about the players' nightlife before their draw away to Real Sociedad in October – and subsequently dismissed him.

== Squad ==
Note: Flags indicate national team as defined under FIFA eligibility rules; some limited exceptions apply. Players may hold more than one non-FIFA nationality.

No.	Pos.	Nation	Player
—	GK	ESP	Abel Resino
—	GK	ESP	Agustín Elduayen
—	DF	ESP	Sergio Morgado
—	DF	ESP	Marcos Alonso
—	DF	ESP	Andoni Goikoetxea
—	DF	ESP	Tomás Reñones
—	DF	ESP	Carlos Aguilera
—	DF	ESP	Antonio Rivas Martínez
—	DF	ESP	José Armando
—	DF	ESP	Arteche
—	MF	ESP	Jesus Landaburu

No.	Pos.	Nation	Player
—	MF	BRA	Alemão
—	MF	ESP	Quique Ramos
—	MF	ESP	Quique Setién
—	MF	ESP	Joaquín Parra
—	MF	ESP	Roberto Marina
—	MF	ESP	Eusebio Sacristán
—	FW	POR	Paulo Futre
—	FW	ESP	Julio Salinas
—	FW	ESP	Roberto López Ufarte
—	FW	ESP	Juan Carlos
—	FW	ESP	Julián Romero
—	FW	ESP	Pedraza

=== Transfers ===
In
Pos.	Name	from	Type
FW	Paulo Futre	FC Porto	
MF	Joaquín Parra	Real Betis	
MF	Eusebio Sacristán	Real Valladolid	
FW	López Ufarte	Real Sociedad	
MF	Marcos Alonso	FC Barcelona	
DF	Andoni Goikoetxea	Athletic Bilbao	
DF	Juan Carlos	Real Valladolid	

Out
Pos.	Name	To	Type
MF	Julio Prieto	Celta Vigo	
DF	Miguel Ángel Ruiz	CD Malaga	
FW	Pedro Uralde	Athletic Bilbao	
FW	Jorge da Silva	River Plate	
DF	Clemente Villaverde	CD Malaga	
MF	Mínguez	CD Tenerife	
FW	Juan Jose Rubio	CE Sabadell	

=== La Liga ===
==== League table ====
Pos	Team	Pld	W	D	L	GF	GA	GD	Pts	Qualification or relegation
1	Real Madrid (C)	38	28	6	4	95	26	+69	62	Qualification for the European Cup first round
2	Real Sociedad	38	22	7	9	61	33	+28	51	Qualification for the UEFA Cup first round
3	Atlético Madrid	38	19	10	9	60	38	+22	48	Qualification for the UEFA Cup first round
4	Athletic Bilbao	38	17	12	9	50	43	+7	46	Qualification for the UEFA Cup first round
5	Osasuna	38	15	10	13	40	34	+6	40	

Source: BDFútbol
Rules for classification: 1) Points; 2) Head-to-head results; 3) Goal difference; 4) Number of goals scored
(C) Champions

==== Position by round ====
Round	1	2	3	4	5	6	7	8	9	10	11	12	13	14	15	16	17	18	19	20	21	22	23	24	25	26	27	28	29	30	31	32	33	34	35	36	37	38
Ground	H	A	H	A	H	A	H	A	H	A	H	A	H	A	H	A	H	A	H	A	H	A	H	A	H	A	H	A	H	A	H	A	H	A	H	A	H	A
Result	W	D	W	L	W	W	W	D	W	W	L	D	W	W	L	W	W	L	W	D	W	W	W	D	L	D	L	D	L	L	W	L	W	D	D	W	W	D
Position	9	7	2	5	4	3	2	2	2	2	2	2	2	2	3	3	3	3	3	3	3	3	2	2	3	3	3	3	3	3	3	3	3	3	3	3	3	3

Source: www.lfp.es
A = Away; H = Home; W = Win; D = Draw; L = Loss; = Leader, 1988-89 European Cup; = 1988-89 UEFA Cup; = 1988-89 Segunda División

==== Matches ====
30 August 1987 1	Atlético Madrid	1–0	CE Sabadell	Madrid
	Lopez Ufarte 4' (pen.)			Stadium: Vicente Calderón; Referee: Calvo Córdova

6 September 1987 2	RCD Mallorca	1–1	Atlético Madrid	Palma
	P. Bonet 43' (pen.)		59' Futre	Stadium: Lluís Sitjar; Referee: Urizar Azpitarte

13 September 1987 3	Atlético Madrid	3–0	CD Logroñés	Madrid
	Salinas 26', 46'; Alemão 35'			Stadium: Vicente Calderón; Attendance: 30 000; Referee: Andújar Oliver

20 September 1987 4	Celta Vigo	1–0	Atlético Madrid	Vigo
	Arteche 58' (o.g.)			Stadium: Balaídos; Attendance: 28 000; Referee: Pérez Sánchez

27 September 1987 5	Atlético Madrid	1–0	Real Betis	Madrid
	Landáburu 34'			Stadium: Vicente Calderón; Referee: Merino González

3 October 1987 6	FC Barcelona	1–2	Atlético Madrid	Barcelona
	Roberto 21'		56' (pen.) Lopez Ufarte; 82' Marina	Stadium: Camp Nou; Attendance: 20 000; Referee: Ramos Marcos

18 October 1987 7	Atlético Madrid	1–0	Real Murcia	Madrid
	Futre 2'			Stadium: Vicente Calderón; Referee: Marín López

25 October 1987 8	Real Sociedad	0–0	Atlético Madrid	San Sebastián
				Stadium: Atotxa; Referee: Sánchez Arminio

1 November 1987 9	Atlético Madrid	3–0	Real Valladolid	Madrid
	Lopez Ufarte 24' (pen.), 74'; Eusebio 87'			Stadium: Vicente Calderón; Attendance: 40 000; Referee: Mazorra Freire

7 November 1987 10	Real Madrid	0–4	Atlético Madrid	Madrid
			10' Salinas; 51' Futre; 74', 84' Lopez Ufarte	Stadium: Santiago Bernabéu; Referee: Enríquez Negreira

22 November 1987 11	Atlético Madrid	1–2	Sporting Gijón	Madrid
	Landáburu 8'		60' Eloy; 69' Villa	Stadium: Vicente Calderón; Attendance: 45 000; Referee: Riera Morro

28 November 1987 12	Real Zaragoza	2–2	Atlético Madrid	Zaragoza
	Señor 38'; J. Salinas 70' (o.g.)		60' Salinas; 81' Lopez Ufarte	Stadium: La Romareda; Attendance: 20 000; Referee: García De Loza

6 December 1987 13	Atlético Madrid	3–1	Osasuna	Madrid
	Futre 8'; Salinas 64'; Parra 84'		2' Gómez	Stadium: Vicente Calderón; Attendance: 30 000; Referee: Jiménez Moreno

13 December 1987 14	UD Las Palmas	0–3	Atlético Madrid	Las Palmas
			36' Arteche; 78', 84' Alemão	Stadium: Insular; Attendance: 18 000; Referee: Benavente Garasa

20 December 1987 15	Atlético Madrid	0–1	Sevilla	Madrid
			35' Ramón	Stadium: Vicente Calderón; Attendance: 45 000; Referee: Socorro González

3 January 1988 16	Español	0–2	Atlético Madrid	Barcelona
			12' Salinas; 90' (pen.) Parra	Stadium: Sarriá; Referee: Martín Navarrete

10 January 1988 17	Atlético Madrid	2–1	Valencia CF	Madrid
	Arteche 18'; Marcos 56'		7' Madjer	Stadium: Vicente Calderon; Referee: Taboada Soto

17 January 1988 18	Athletic Bilbao	5–1	Atlético Madrid	Bilbao
	Liceranzu 25', 67'; Ferreira 39', 61'; Uralde 47'		14' Futre	Stadium: San Mamés; Attendance: 43 000; Referee: Pes Pérez

24 January 1988 19	Atlético Madrid	2–1	Cadiz CF	Madrid
	Alemão 13'; Salinas 64'		16' Cabrera	Stadium: Vicente Calderón; Attendance: 35 000; Referee: Díaz Vega

31 January 1988 20	CE Sabadell	1–1	Atlético Madrid	Sabadell
	Barbarà 70'		29' Salinas	Stadium: Nova Creu Alta; Attendance: 17 000; Referee: Pérez Sánchez

7 February 1988 21	Atlético Madrid	7–0	RCD Mallorca	Madrid
	Alemão 21'; Parra 23'; Salinas 27' , 41'; Landáburu 60'; Eusebio 73'; Futre 89'			Stadium: Vicente Calderón; Attendance: 35 000; Referee: Díaz Agüero

10 February 1988 22	CD Logroñés	0–2	Atlético Madrid	Logroño
			76' Marcos; 89' Salinas	Stadium: Las Gaunas; Attendance: 18 000; Referee: Ramos Marcos

14 February 1988 23	Atlético Madrid	2–1	Celta Vigo	Madrid
	Salinas 49'; Parra 64'		41' Marić	Stadium: Vicente Calderón; Attendance: 40 000; Referee: Urío Velázquez

21 February 1988 24	Real Betis	1–1	Atlético Madrid	Sevilla
	Melenas 15'		39' Salinas	Stadium: Benito Villamarin; Referee: Merino González

27 February 1988 25	Atlético Madrid	0–2	FC Barcelona	Madrid
			31', 55' Lineker	Stadium: Vicente Calderón; Referee: García De Loza

6 March 1988 26	Real Murcia	0–0	Atlético Madrid	Murcia
				Stadium: La Condomina; Referee: Valdés Sánchez

10 March 1988 27	Atlético Madrid	0–2	Real Sociedad	Madrid
			59' Bakero; 77' Begiristain	Stadium: Vicente Calderón; Referee: Sánchez Arminio

13 March 1988 28	Real Valladolid	0–0	Atlético Madrid	Valladolid
				Stadium: José Zorrilla; Referee: Enríquez Negreira

20 March 1988 29	Atlético Madrid	1–3	Real Madrid	Madrid
	Setién 82'		22' Gordillo; 35' H. Sánchez; 64' Butragueño	Stadium: Vicente Calderón; Referee: Urizar Azpitarte

26 March 1988 30	Sporting Gijón	2–0	Atlético Madrid	Gijón
	Joaquín 7'; Emilio 44'			Stadium: El Molinón; Attendance: 15 000; Referee: Marín López

3 April 1988 31	Atlético Madrid	2–0	Real Zaragoza	Madrid
	Arteche 14'; Salinas 85'			Stadium: Vicente Calderón; Referee: Pérez Sánchez

10 April 1988 32	Osasuna	2–1	Atlético Madrid	Pamplona
	Ziganda 25'; Sola 90' (pen.)		47' Futre	Stadium: El Sadar; Referee: Socorro González

17 April 1988 33	Atlético Madrid	1–0	UD Las Palmas	Madrid
	Parra 42'			Stadium: Vicente Calderón; Attendance: 25 000; Referee: Bayarri Ribelles

24 April 1988 34	Sevilla FC	1–1	Atlético Madrid	Sevilla
	Cholo 35'		17' Eusebio	Stadium: Sanchez Pizjuan; Referee: Ramos Marcos

30 April 1988 35	Atlético Madrid	1–1	Español	Madrid
	Salinas 81'		53' Mauri	Stadium: Vicente Calderón; Attendance: 30 000; Referee: Jiménez Moreno

7 May 1988 36	Valencia CF	3–4	Atlético Madrid	Valencia
	Madjer 7'; Alcañiz 56'; Fernando 60' (pen.)		18' Armando; 26' Landáburu; 57' Arteche; 75' Futre	Stadium: Luis Casanova; Referee: Riera Morro

14 May 1988 37	Atlético Madrid	1–0	Athletic Bilbao	Madrid
	Salinas 13'			Stadium: Vicente Calderón; Attendance: 30 000; Referee: Peraita Ibáñez

22 May 1988 38	Cadiz CF	3–3	Atlético Madrid	Cadiz
	M. González 13'; Oliva 29'; Zalazar 80' (pen.)		56' J. Romero; 57' Lopez Ufarte; 70' Rivas	Stadium: Ramón de Carranza; Attendance: 15 000; Referee: Taboada Soto

=== Copa del Rey ===
==== Round of 32 ====
12 November 1987 1	Elche FC	1–0	Atlético Madrid	Elche
	Bračun 12'			Stadium: Martínez Valero; Attendance: 20 000; Referee: Andújar Oliver

2 December 1987 2	Atlético Madrid	2–1 (a.e.t.) (7 – 6 p)	Elche FC	Madrid
	Lopez Ufarte 24'; Landáburu 34'		13' Sixto	Stadium: Vicente Calderón; Attendance: 2 500; Referee: Caetano Bueno
	Penalties
	Landáburu (penalty missed); Marina; Futre; Parra; J. Salinas; Pedraza (penalty missed); Aguilera; Sergio; Arteche		Bračun; Del Barrio; Robi; (penalty missed) Isidro; Cepeda; (penalty missed) Boria; Company; B. Sánchez; (penalty missed) Javi

==== Eightfinals ====
16 December 1987 1	Atlético Madrid	0–0	Las Palmas	Madrid
				Stadium: Vicente Calderón; Attendance: 12 000 Arbitro: Referee: Sánchez-Molina Soto

6 January 1988 2	Las Palmas	1–3	Atlético Madrid	Las Palmas
	Dajka 37' Marcatori		46' Eusebio 67' Parra 86' J. Salinas	Stadium: Insular; Attendance: 13 000 Arbitro: Andalusia (bandiera); Referee: Alfonso Álvarez

==== Quarterfinals ====
13 January 1988 1	Atlético Madrid	2–1	Real Sociedad	Madrid
	Futre 12'; Landáburu 55'		83' Begiristain	Stadium: Vicente Calderón; Attendance: 45 000; Referee: Ramos Marcos

21 January 1988 2	Real Sociedad	3–1	Atlético Madrid	San Sebastián
	Begiristain 5', 10'; Loren 75'		85' J. Salinas	Stadium: Atotxa; Referee: Sánchez Arminio

== Statistics ==
=== Players statistics ===
No.	Pos	Nat	Player	Total		La Liga		Copa del Rey	
No.	Pos	Nat	Player	Apps	Goals	Apps	Goals	Apps	Goals
	GK	(Spain) ESP	Abel Resino	38	-37	32	-30	6	-7
	DF	(Spain) ESP	Tomás Reñones	43	0	37	0	6	0
	DF	(Spain) ESP	Sergio Morgado	28	0	22+4	0	2	0
	DF	(Spain) ESP	Arteche	41	4	35	4	6	0
	MF	(Spain) ESP	Jesus Landaburu	42	6	31+5	4	6	2
	MF	(Brazil) BRA	Alemão	35	5	31	5	4	0
	MF	(Spain) ESP	Joaquín Parra	38	6	26+7	5	3+2	1
	MF	(Spain) ESP	Eusebio Sacristán	32	4	23+4	3	4+1	1
	FW	(Spain) ESP	Roberto López Ufarte	33	9	20+7	8	5+1	1
	FW	(Spain) ESP	Julio Salinas	42	18	36+1	16	5	2
	FW	(Portugal) POR	Paulo Futre	39	9	35	8	4	1
	GK	(Spain) ESP	Agustín Elduayen	6	-8	6	-8	0	0
	MF	(Spain) ESP	Quique Ramos	28	0	18+6	0	3+1	0
	DF	(Spain) ESP	Marcos Alonso	30	2	16+10	2	2+2	0
	DF	(Spain) ESP	Andoni Goikoetxea	17	0	12+1	0	4	0
	DF	(Spain) ESP	Juan Carlos	15	0	11+1	0	3	0
	DF	(Spain) ESP	José Armando	11	1	11	1		
	MF	(Spain) ESP	Quique Setién	12	1	11	1	1	0
	MF	(Spain) ESP	Roberto Marina	14	1	4+6	1	2+2	0
	DF	(Spain) ESP	Carlos Aguilera	6	0	3+3	0		
	DF	(Spain) ESP	Antonio Rivas Martínez	3	1	2+1	1		
	FW	(Spain) ESP	Julián Romero	1	1	1	1		
	FW	(Spain) ESP	Pedraza	6	0	0+4	0	0+2	0
	GK	(Spain) ESP	Angel Mejias	0	0	0	0		

- Source: https://www.bdfutbol.com/en/t/t1987-887.html
