= Joaquín Parra =

Joaquín Parra may refer to:

- Joaquín Parra (footballer) (born 1961), Spanish football manager and former player
- Joaquín Parra (actor) (died 2022), Spanish actor
