= Cabeza de Framontanos =

- Village
- Location
- Coordinates: 41°12′54″N 6°26′17″W
- Country: Spain
- Autonomous Community: Comunidad Autónoma de Castilla y León
- Province: Salamanca
- Founded: 13th century

Government
  - Mayor: María Consolación Salvador Salvador (PSOE)

Area
  - Land: 102.64 km^{2} (39.63 sq mi)
- Elevation: 792 m (2,598 ft)

Population (2006)
  - Total: 122
  - Density: 1.189/km^{2} (3.08/sq mi)
- Time zone: UTC+1 (CET)
  - Summer (DST): UTC+2 (CEST)
- Postal code: 37174
- Area code: 34 (Spain) + 923 (Salamanca)
- Website: http://www.cabezadeframontanos.tk/

Cabeza de Framontanos is a village in the northwest of the province of Salamanca, western Spain, part of the autonomous community of Castile-Leon. From 1970 it belonged to the village Villarino de los Aires.

== History ==
Cabeza de Framontanos was formerly an independent municipality. In 1975, it was incorporated into the neighboring municipality of Villarino de los Aires after its local council reported insufficient financial resources to provide the required basic municipal services.

== See also ==
- List of municipalities in Salamanca

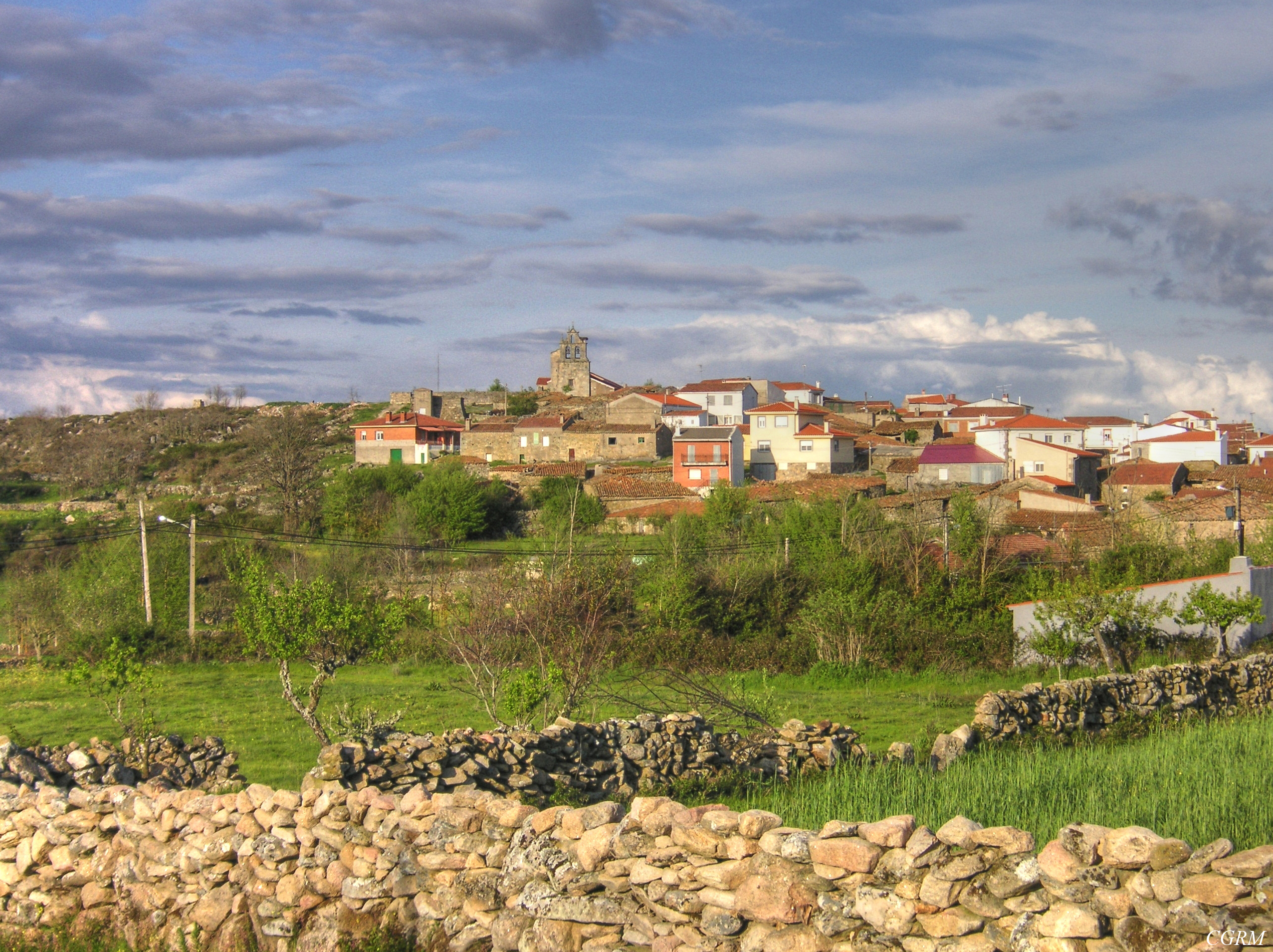
La Cabeza
