= Molondro =

Spanish footballer (born 1964)

Personal information
- Full name: Miquel Bennàssar Mojer
- Date of birth: 19 October 1964 (age 62)
- Place of birth: Sa Pobla, Spain
- Height: 1.79 m (5 ft 10 in)
- Position: Goalkeeper

Senior career*
Years	Team	Apps	(Gls)
1984–1985	Constància		
1985–1988	Poblense	77	(0)
1988–1993	Mallorca	8	(0)
1990–1991	Mallorca B	36	(0)
1993–1999	Poblense		
Total		121+	(0)
- * Club domestic league appearances and goals

Miquel Bennàssar Mojer (born 19 October 1964), known as Molondro, is a Spanish former footballer who played as a goalkeeper. He spent five years at RCD Mallorca, all as a reserve or back-up, playing three games in the Segunda División and five in La Liga.

== Career ==
Born in Sa Pobla in Mallorca, Molondro played in the lower leagues for Constància and Poblense before arriving at RCD Mallorca in the Segunda División in 1988. He was back-up to Ezzaki Badou in every game of his first season up to 1 January 1989, when the Moroccan was injured; his debut was a 1–0 home loss to Castellón with Molondro's error in clearing the ball allowing the opponents' goal.

Molondro was an unused substitute in the 1991 Copa del Rey final, in which Mallorca lost 1–0 to Atlético Madrid after extra time. He was one of only five players to attend the congratulation ceremony by Palma de Mallorca mayor Joan Fageda, as the rest of the squad had gone on holiday.

In October 1991, Ezzaki Badou returned to his country without explanation, leaving Molondro to play in goal. He played his first La Liga game on 20 October, a 1–0 home win over Cádiz. On 3 November, he was sent off before half time for conceding a penalty kick with a foul on Ernesto Valverde, which was scored by visitors Athletic Bilbao in their 2–1 win. He totalled five top-flight games – four losses – and the club signed Romania international Bogdan Stelea to replace him before the end of the month.

Molondro's contract expired in July 1993, with Mallorca still in the second tier, and he was released. He returned to Poblense, taking part in the Tercera División playoffs in 1996.

Molondro later became president of Poblense. In April 2010, he joined the bid of his former Mallorca manager Lorenzo Serra Ferrer, who was attempting to buy the club.

== Personal life ==
Molondro's son Miquel (born 1994), who inherited his nickname, also played in goal for Poblense.
