= 1991 Copa del Rey final =

Copa del Rey 1991 final
- Event: 1990–91 Copa del Rey
Atlético Madrid	Mallorca
1	0
- Date: 29 June 1991
- Venue: Santiago Bernabéu, Madrid
- Referee: Joaquín Ramos Marco
- Attendance: 60,000

The 1991 Copa del Rey final was the 89th final of the Spanish cup competition, the Copa del Rey. The final was played at Estadio Santiago Bernabéu in Madrid on 29 June 1991.

The match was won by Atlético Madrid, who beat RCD Mallorca 1–0.

== Match details ==
29 June 1991
20:30 CET

Atlético Madrid	1–0	Mallorca
Alfredo 111'	Report (in Spanish)

Santiago Bernabéu Stadium, Madrid
Attendance: 60,000
Referee: Joaquín Ramos Marco

Atlético Madrid	Mallorca

Atlético Madrid:
GK	1	(Spain) Ángel Mejías	(yellow card) 102'
RB	2	(Spain) Tomás Reñones
CB	6	(Spain) Patxi Ferreira
CB	5	(Spain) Juanito	(yellow card) 101'
CB	4	(Spain) Roberto Solozábal	(yellow card) 75'
LB	3	(Spain) Toni
RM	8	(Germany) Bernd Schuster
CM	9	(Spain) Juan Vizcaíno
LM	11	(Spain) Antonio Orejuela		(substituted off) 61'
RF	7	(Spain) Manolo
LF	10	(Portugal) Paulo Futre (c)		(substituted off) 86'
Substitutes:
RM	12	(Brazil) Donato
GK	13	(Andorra) Koldo
CM	14	(Spain) Alfredo		(substituted on) 61'
RB	15	(Spain) Carlos Aguilera
LF	16	(Spain) Juan Sabas		(substituted on) 86'
Manager:
(Argentina) Iselín Santos Ovejero

RCD Mallorca:
GK	1	(Morocco) Badou Ezzaki (c)
DF	2	(Spain) Ángel Pedraza	(yellow card) 67'
DF	5	(Spain) Esteve Fradera
DF	4	(Spain) Pedro del Campo
DF	3	(Spain) José Serer
MF	6	(Spain) Pascual Parra
MF	8	(Spain) Miguel Ángel Nadal	(yellow card) 18'
MF	7	(Spain) Paco Soler
MF	11	(Spain) Marcos		(substituted off) 52'
MF	10	(Spain) Armando
FW	9	(Morocco) Hassan Nader	(yellow card) 69'	(substituted off) 79'
Substitutes:
MF	12	(Spain) Antonio Calderón
GK	13	(Spain) Molondro
FW	14	(Spain) Álvaro Cervera		(substituted on) 52'
FW	15	(Spain) Claudio Barragán		(substituted on) 79'
MF	16	(Spain) Roberto Marina
Manager:
(Spain) Lorenzo Serra Ferrer

MATCH RULES

- 90 minutes.
- 30 minutes of extra-time if necessary.
- Penalty shoot-out if scores still level.
- Five named substitutes.
- Maximum of two substitutions.
