= Aldeadávila de la Ribera =

- municipality
- Coat of arms

- Location in Salamanca

- Location in Spain
- Coordinates: 41°13′06″N 6°37′12″W
- Country: Spain
- Autonomous community: Castile and León
- Province: Salamanca
- Comarca: Vitigudino
- Subcomarca: La Ribera de Salamanca

Government
  - Mayor: Santiago Hernández Pérez (Spanish Socialist Workers' Party)

Area
  - Total: 46 km^{2} (18 sq mi)
- Elevation: 679 m (2,228 ft)

Population (2025-01-01)
  - Total: 1,094
  - Density: 24/km^{2} (62/sq mi)
- Time zone: UTC+1 (CET)
  - Summer (DST): UTC+2 (CEST)
- Postal code: 37250, 37251, 37253
- Website: aldeadavila.es

Aldeadávila de la Ribera is a village and municipality in the north-west of the province of Salamanca, western Spain, part of the autonomous community of Castile and León.

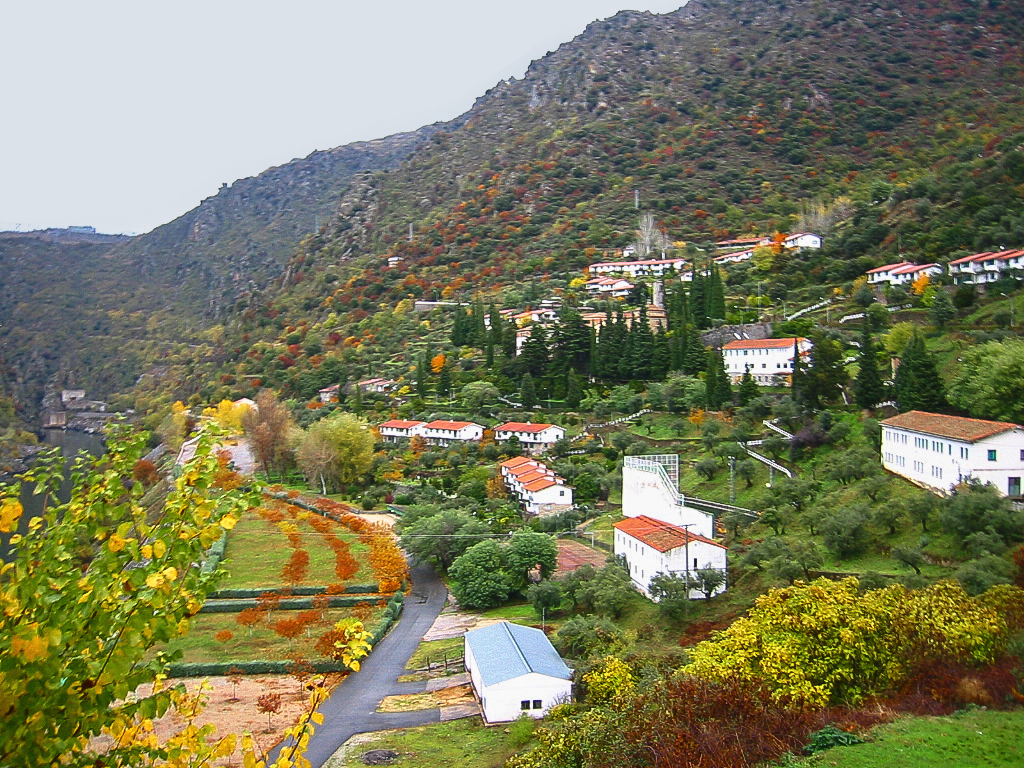
Salto de Aldeadávila

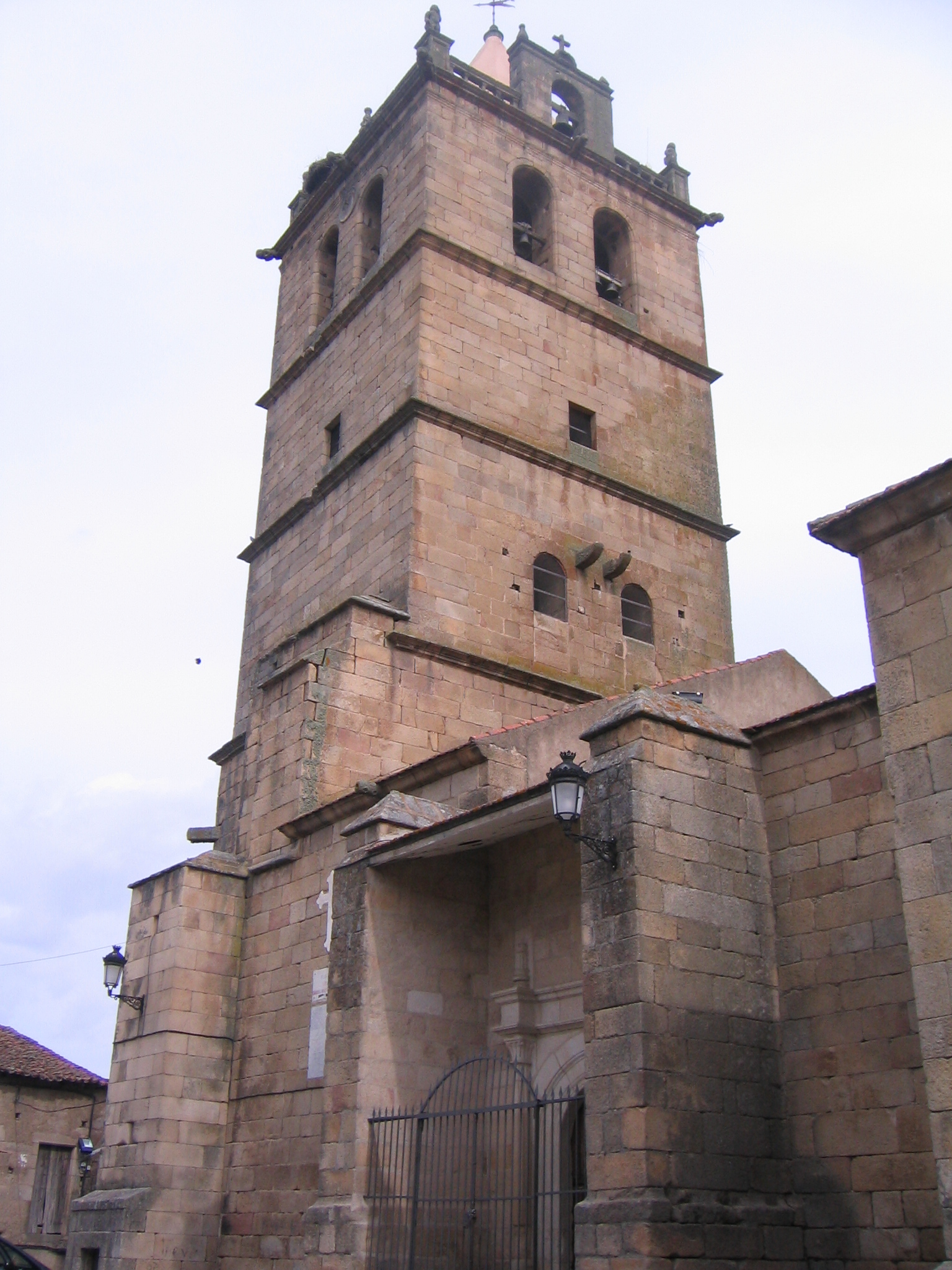
Church of Saint Saviour

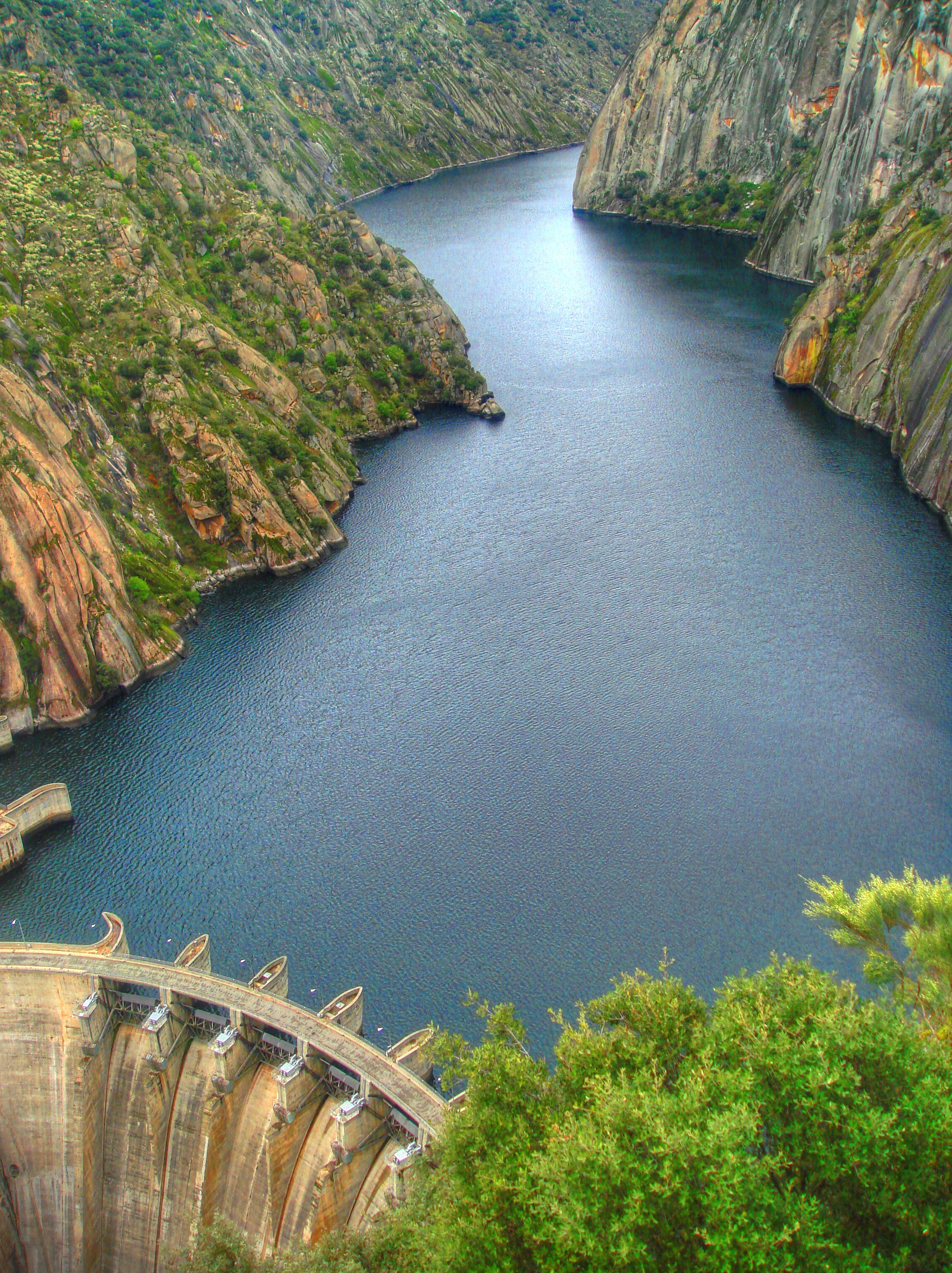
Aldeadávila Dam

== Geography ==
Aldeadávila de la Ribera is located in the northwest of the Salamanca province. It borders Portugal and is 60 miles from the city of Salamanca.

It is part of the region of La Ribera. It belongs to the Mancomunidad Centro Duero and to the judicial district of Vitigudino.

The municipal district includes the towns of Aldeadávila de la Ribera, Corporario and Salto de Aldeadávila.

Its territory is included in the Arribes del Duero natural park, a protected natural area of great tourist and scientific attraction.

=== Geomorphology ===
Aldeadávila de la Ribera has a predominantly gentle, hilly relief, typical of the Zamoran-Salamancan peneplain of the Northern Plateau, which contrasts with the deep river beds of the River Duero and its tributaries. Its average altitude ranges between 2395 ft and 2198 ft, with the highest point being the Pico de la Cabeza (2545 ft) and the lowest point being the bank of the Duero River at the base of the Aldeadávila Dam (623 ft).

Geologically, Aldeadávila lies within the Iberian Massif, one of the largest geological units of the Iberian Peninsula. Two main rock types can be identified in the municipality: granitoids, among which the granitic massif in which the Aldeadávila dam is excavated stands out; and schists and slates of the Schist-Grauvaic Complex. There are also some scattered pegmatites with mineralisations of some interest that were exploited in the past.

The most important landscape feature of Aldeadávila de la Ribera is the fluvial canyon of the river Duero, a deep incision of more than 60 miles in length which constitutes one of the largest fluvial canyons in the Iberian Peninsula. This canyon is also one of the geosites recognised by the Global Geosites project in Spain.

=== Populated places ===
The municipality of Aldeadávila is made up of the town of Aldeadávila de la Ribera, where the town hall is located, and the adjoining towns of Corporario de la Ribera and the village of Salto de Aldeadávila, formerly known as Santa Marina or La Verde.

Corporario is a locality of just over 150 inhabitants located immediately next to Aldeadávila, so close to it that they practically form the same urban nucleus. Antonio Llorente says in his book "it can almost be considered as a neighbourhood of Aldeadávila". It was an independent municipality until 1972, when it was annexed to Aldeadávila, mainly due to the lack of economic means to provide the obligatory minimum services. It now has no town council, but continues to hold its own patron saint festivals, for example. Its church, one of the oldest in the province, is of singular beauty and is recommended as a tourist attraction.

Salto de Aldeadávila is a small village in the Duero valley, dominated by the Altos de Lagoaça. It has existed since the 12th century due to the hermits who settled in the Convent of La Verde, which after its abandonment was remodelled and reused as an inn in the 1950s. It currently has a population of around 20 people. It has always depended administratively on Aldeadávila.

== Monuments and sights ==
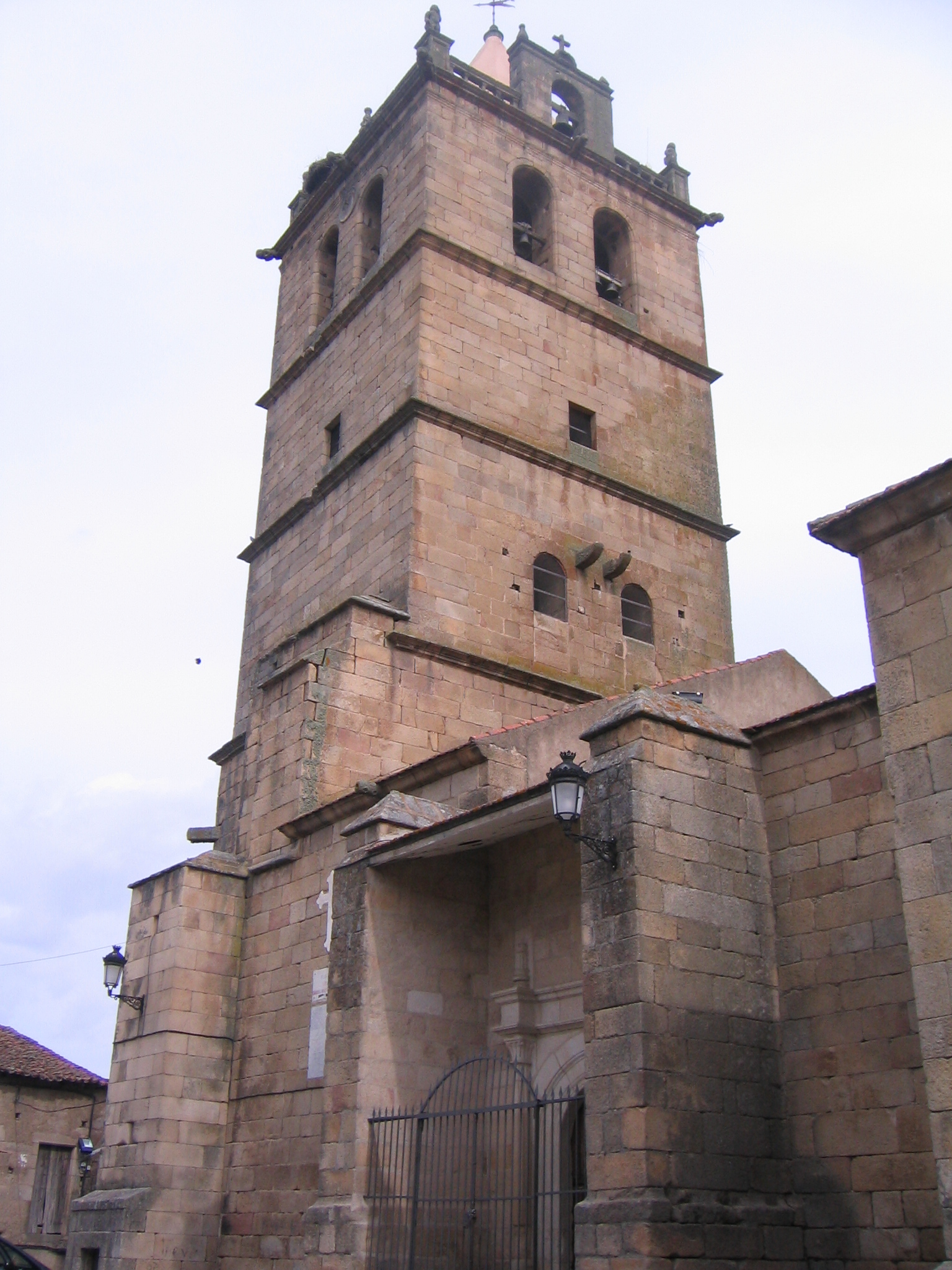
Church of Saint Saviour

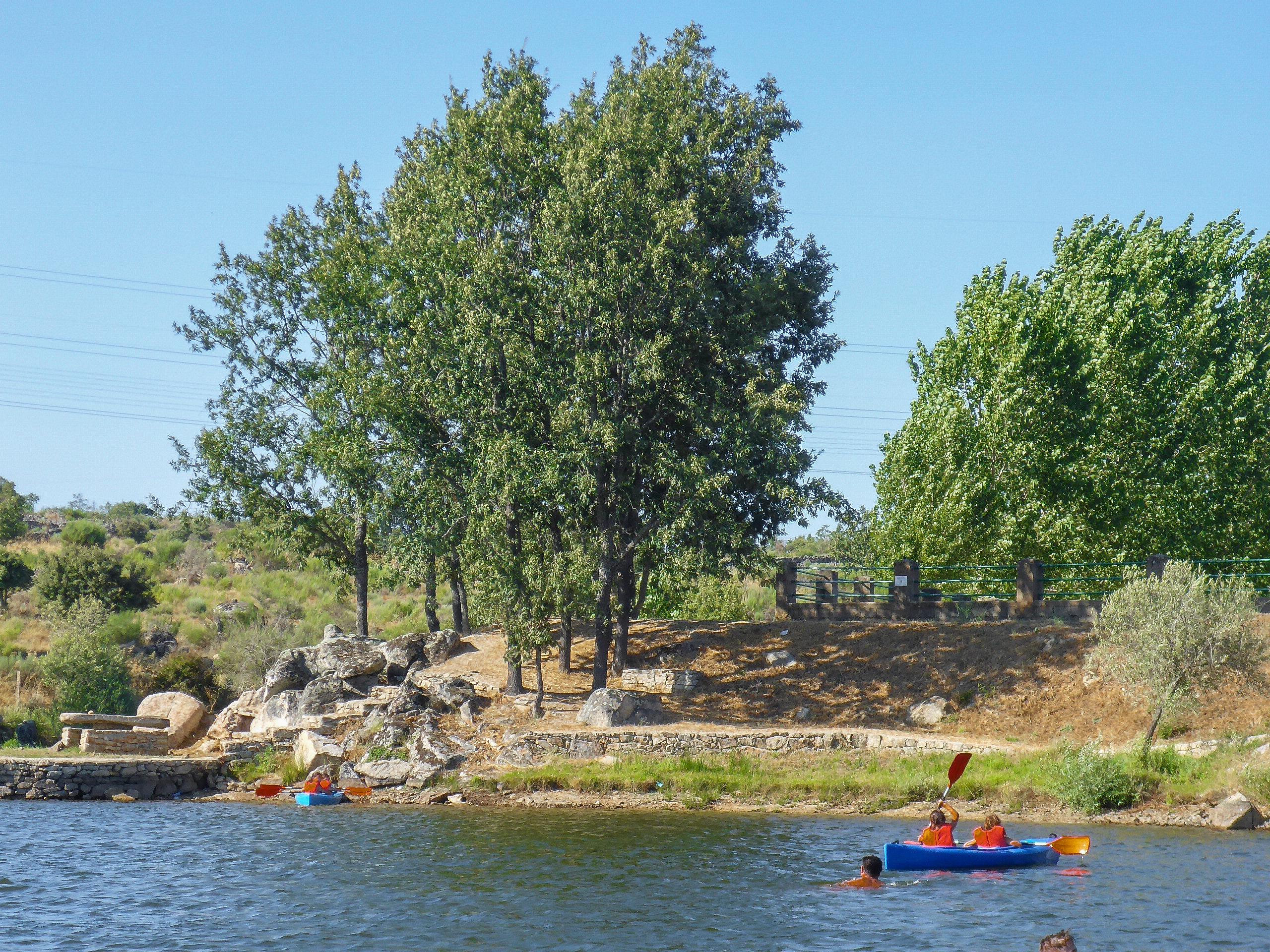
El Rocoso recreational area

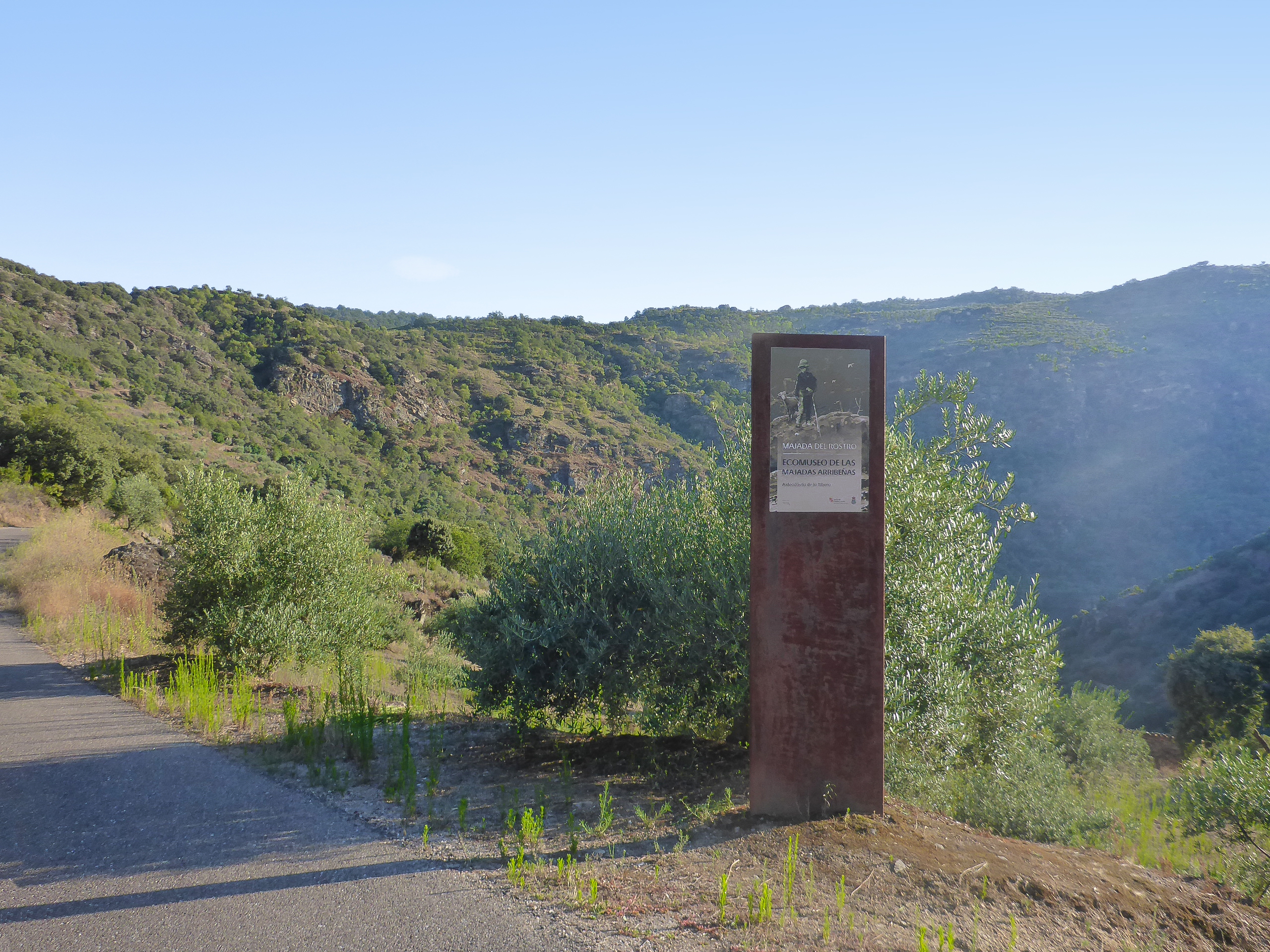
Entrance to the ethnological museum of Las Majadas Arribeñas

=== Aldeadávila Dam ===
The best known and most visited place in the municipality is possibly the Aldeadávila dam. It forms part of the hydroelectric system known as Saltos del Duero; it is located in the area known as Arribes del Duero, with base gradients that in some sections exceed 1300 ft. Scenes from audiovisual productions such as Doctor Zhivago and La cabina by José Luis López Vázquez have been filmed here. It was inaugurated by Francisco Franco on 9 July 1964, one year after its completion. It can be seen from the viewpoint of the dam, the Picón de Felipe and the Fraile viewpoint. With 2400 GWh per year, it is the dam with the highest electricity production in Spain.

=== Church of Saint Saviour ===
The tower known as the Tower of Aldeadávila was built as a military fortress to defend the town in the 13th century under the rule of the Infante Pedro de Molina y Aragón, preserving a Romanesque door on the north face, and walls more than two metres wide, as well as four sturdy double buttresses. In the 16th century it was joined to the church, forming the bell tower, and the beautiful gate on the north side with Ionic columns was built. This castle witnessed episodes of war under the Infantes Sancho Pérez, Pedro de Molina and the time of the banditry with García de Ledesma.

The parish church of Saint Saviour began to be built in the 13th century before 1265, on loan from the cathedral church of Salamanca, as a convent of the fortress, preserving the semicircular arched doorway and eight buttresses that support the gravity arches of the roof. It underwent a major refurbishment between the 15th and 16th centuries. It has a Baroque altarpiece from the 17th century and chapels added in the 18th century.

The village of Salto de Aldeadávila is undoubtedly one of the most picturesque places in the area. It is located on the road to the Aldeadávila dam. It has the Convent of La Verde, also known as the Convent of Santa Marina, built from the 12th to the 18th century.

=== Other historical heritage sites ===
El Encinar necropolis is an early medieval archaeological site comprising a total of five sarcophagus tombs scattered on a hillside, halfway between the municipality and the Convent of La Verde.

Other religious constructions in the municipality are the parish church of Corporario, from the 13th and 14th centuries, with a late Roman stele and a fragment of an anthropomorphic tomb, the hermitage of Santo Cristo del Humilladero, from the 17th century, the hermitage of La Santa or Nuestra Señora de las Huertas, with a beautiful portico from the 17th century, and the hermitage of La Santa or Nuestra Señora de las Huertas, with a beautiful 18th century portico and Baroque altarpiece from the Convent of Santa Marina, the historic crosses of the Via Crucis, from the 16th and 18th centuries, or the hermitage of San Sebastián, from the 13th to the 19th century, with medieval inscriptions, which has been fitted out as a tourist office.

Among the buildings of a civil nature, the Palace of the Marquis of Caballero, from the 18th century, with coats of arms of the Caballero family, the historic building of the customs house, from 1739, which was a second class customs house with a boat and which in 1866 was extended for the export of livestock or the Palace of Manuel Caballero del Pozo (1790-1800), located in Calle Poza, as well as the different historic huts of the Caballero family, are worth mentioning.
