= Pedro del Campo (footballer) =

Spanish association football player

Personal information
- Full name: Pedro Pablo del Campo Zafra
- Date of birth: 4 April 1968 (age 58)
- Place of birth: Madrid, Spain
- Height: 1.82 m (6 ft 0 in)
- Position: Defender

Youth career
- CIDE
- Mallorca

Senior career*
Years	Team	Apps	(Gls)
1986–1991	Mallorca B	68+	(4+)
1991	Mallorca	9	(1)
1991–1995	Sevilla	53	(1)
1995–1996	Elche	32	(8)
1996–1997	Mar Menor	10	(0)
Total		172+	(14+)
- * Club domestic league appearances and goals

Pedro Pablo del Campo Zafra (born 4 April 1968), also known by the nickname Perico, is a Spanish former footballer who played as a defender. He played 62 La Liga games and scored 2 goals in the competition for Mallorca and Sevilla.

== Career ==
Del Campo was born in Madrid but moved to Mallorca. He played youth football for CIDE before joining the ranks of RCD Mallorca.

After playing for the reserve team in the Tercera División and Segunda División B, Del Campo earned a place in the first team at the expense of Croatian Zoran Vulić. He made his debut in La Liga on 15 April 1991 in a 1–1 draw at home to Sporting de Gijón. He scored his first goal in the competition on 12 May, a penalty to equalise late in a 1–1 home draw with Sevilla. On 16 June, again from 12 yards, he scored the last goal of a 3–1 win over Valencia in the Copa del Rey quarter-finals, putting the Balearic side into the last four for the first time. Thirteen days later he played the final against Atlético Madrid, losing by a single goal after extra time.

Del Campo had played for Mallorca as an amateur, and when he moved to Sevilla in July 1991 on a four-year contract worth 100 million Spanish pesetas, he was legally required to be in the city of Seville for reasons of education or other employment. For this reason, he was also hired in the club's administration and played his first season officially as an amateur footballer. He played 71 games over his stay, scoring once on 13 March 1994 by heading a late winner in a 2–1 home victory over Lleida.
