= Masueco =

- Municipality
- Coat of arms

- Location in Salamanca

- Location in Spain
- Coordinates: 41°12′16″N 6°35′20″W
- Country: Spain
- Autonomous community: Castile and León
- Province: Salamanca
- Comarca: Vitigudino
- Subcomarca: La Ribera de Salamanca

Government
  - Mayor: Marceliano Sevilla Gorjón (People's Party)

Area
  - Total: 20 km^{2} (7.7 sq mi)
- Elevation: 684 m (2,244 ft)

Population (2025-01-01)
  - Total: 240
  - Density: 12/km^{2} (31/sq mi)
- Time zone: UTC+1 (CET)
  - Summer (DST): UTC+2 (CEST)
- Postal code: 37251

Masueco is a municipality located in the province of Salamanca, Castile and León, Spain. As of 2016 the municipality has a population of 325 inhabitants.
