= Pereña de la Ribera =

- municipality
- Coat of arms

- Location in Salamanca

- Location in Spain
- Coordinates: 41°14′24″N 6°31′27″W
- Country: Spain
- Autonomous community: Castile and León
- Province: Salamanca
- Comarca: Comarca de Vitigudino
- Subcomarca: La Ribera de Salamanca

Government
  - Mayor: Luis Rodríguez Herrero (PSOE)

Area
  - Total: 49 km^{2} (19 sq mi)
- Elevation: 682 m (2,238 ft)

Population (2025-01-01)
  - Total: 300
  - Density: 6.1/km^{2} (16/sq mi)
- Time zone: UTC+1 (CET)
  - Summer (DST): UTC+2 (CEST)
- Postal code: 37175
- Website: perenadelaribera.es

Pereña de la Ribera is a Spanish municipality in the autonomous community of Castile and León. It has a population of 377 as of 2016 on a total area of 49 km^{2} (19 sq mi).
