= Mieza, Spain =

Mieza
- Municipality
- Flag Coat of arms

- Location in Salamanca

- Location in Spain
- Coordinates: 41°09′44″N 6°41′15″W
- Country: Spain
- Autonomous community: Castile and León
- Province: Salamanca
- Comarca: Vitigudino
- Subcomarca: La Ribera de Salamanca

Government
  - Mayor: Ismael García Carreto (People's Party)

Area
  - Total: 35 km^{2} (14 sq mi)
- Elevation: 658 m (2,159 ft)

Population (2025-01-01)
  - Total: 170
  - Density: 4.9/km^{2} (13/sq mi)
- Time zone: UTC+1 (CET)
  - Summer (DST): UTC+2 (CEST)
- Postal code: 37254

Mieza is a municipality located in the province of Salamanca, Castile and León, Spain. As of 2016 the municipality has a population of 226 inhabitants.
