= Andoni Goikoetxea =

Spanish footballer

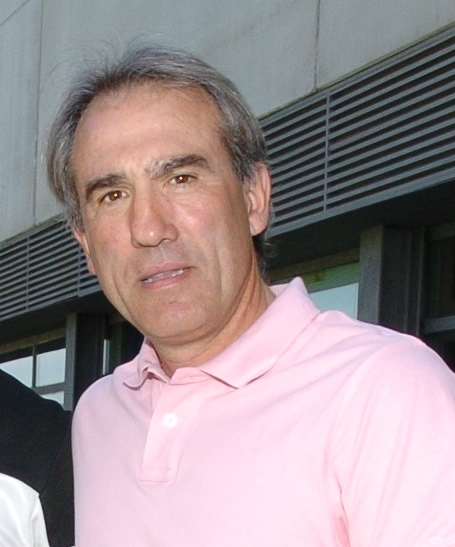

Personal information
- Full name: Andoni Goikoetxea Olaskoaga
- Date of birth: 23 August 1956 (age 70)
- Place of birth: Alonsotegi, Spain
- Height: 1.85 m (6 ft 1 in)
- Position: Centre-back

Youth career
- Arbuyo
- 1973–1974: Athletic Bilbao

Senior career*
Years	Team	Apps	(Gls)
1973–1975	Bilbao Athletic	25	(8)
1975–1987	Athletic Bilbao	277	(35)
1987–1990	Atlético Madrid	35	(0)
Total		337	(43)

International career
1975	Spain U18	1	(0)
1977	Spain U21	3	(0)
1983	Spain amateur	1	(0)
1983–1988	Spain	39	(4)
1978–1990	Basque Country	4	(0)

Managerial career
- 1992–1996: Spain U21
- 1995: Spain U20
- 1996–1998: Salamanca
- 1998–1999: Compostela
- 1999–2000: Numancia
- 2000–2001: Racing Santander
- 2001: Rayo Vallecano
- 2004–2005: Salamanca
- 2005–2007: Numancia
- 2007–2008: Hércules
- 2010–2011: Ceuta
- 2013–2015: Equatorial Guinea
Medal record
Men's football
Representing Spain (as manager)
UEFA European Under-21 Championship
Bronze medal – third place	1994
- * Club domestic league appearances and goals

Andoni Goikoetxea Olaskoaga (born 23 August 1956), Goiko for short, is a Spanish former professional football centre-back and manager.

He was known for his aggressive play, and was nicknamed "The Butcher of Bilbao". He mainly played for Athletic Bilbao, being known as El Gigante de Alonsotegui (The Giant of Alonsotegui) among the club's fans.

Goikoetxea was a Spanish international in the 1980s. He won 39 caps, and represented the country in the 1986 World Cup and Euro 1984.

== Club career ==
=== Athletic Bilbao ===
Born in Alonsotegi, Biscay, Goikoetxea began playing football with local Arbuyo before joining Athletic Bilbao in 1973 where, after starting out at the reserve side, he soon established himself in the senior team squad. He scored four La Liga goals in 27 games in his debut season, but played a lesser role in the following three years with a total of only 24 appearances.

During the 1980s, along with Dani, José Ramón Gallego, José Núñez, Manuel Sarabia and Andoni Zubizarreta, Goiko was a prominent member of the successful Bilbao side coached by Javier Clemente. In 1984 the Basque club renewed its league title, also achieving the double (league and Copa del Rey) in that year.

Goikoetxea severely injured FC Barcelona midfielder Bernd Schuster in 1981, leaving him with a serious right knee injury from which the German never fully recovered.

==== Maradona foul ====
On 24 September 1983, Goikoetxea achieved notoriety for a foul on Diego Maradona described as "one of the most brutal fouls ever delivered in the history of Spanish football". In a league match at the Camp Nou, he tackled the Argentine from behind and broke his ankle. Maradona compared the sound he heard to that of wood breaking and, in the aftermath, English journalist Edward Owen coined the phrase "Butcher of Bilbao" to describe Goikoetxea, a nickname which stayed with him for the rest of his career. Maradona's compatriot César Luis Menotti, the coach of Barcelona, accused the Spaniard of "belonging to a 'race of anti-footballers'" and called for a lifelong ban; he was served a ten-match ban by the Royal Spanish Football Federation. It was later reported he kept "the boot he had used to destroy...(Maradona's) ankle ligaments" at home in a glass case.

When the two teams met in the 1984 Copa del Rey final in May, the match ended 1–0 for Athletic. Featuring in a mass brawl on the pitch, he kicked Maradona's chest; he was initially banned for 18 games for his actions, but the suspension was later reduced to seven.

=== Later career ===
After three years with Atlético Madrid where he featured sparingly, Goikoetxea retired aged 33. He appeared in 369 competitive matches for Athletic, scoring 44 times.

== International career ==
Goikoetxea played 39 matches with Spain, making his debut against the Netherlands on 16 February 1983. He represented the nation at both UEFA Euro 1984 and the 1986 FIFA World Cup. During the latter competition he scored one of his four international goals, through a penalty in a round-of-16 5–1 win against Denmark – the remaining four came courtesy of Emilio Butragueño.

== Coaching career ==
Goikoetxea became a coach two years after retiring, starting to work at club level in 1996 and going on to be in charge of UD Salamanca (twice), SD Compostela, CD Numancia (two spells), Racing de Santander and Rayo Vallecano. In the 1996–97 season he guided Salamanca to promotion from the Segunda División, finishing second. He was assistant with the Spain national team to his former manager Clemente, during the 1994 World Cup held in the United States.

In June 2007, Goikoetxea joined Alicante-based Hércules CF in the second tier, being released at the end of the campaign after being suspended by the club for implying its internal structures "stank". On 6 March 2013, he was appointed coach of Equatorial Guinea on a one-year contract, being dismissed in January 2015 just three weeks before the start of the 2015 Africa Cup of Nations due to poor performances in friendlies, which included a loss to a Portuguese lower-league side.

== Style of play ==
Although he lacked pace, Goikoetxea was a tall and physically powerful central defender. He was known as El Gigante de Alonsotegui (The Giant of Alonsotegui) among the fans of Athletic Bilbao, a reference to his height and hometown.

Goikoetxea was also notorious for his aggressive style of play, not least because of the two heavy fouls (see Maradona foul) on Maradona and Schuster which earned him the nickname "Butcher of Bilbao". In 2007, English newspaper The Times named him the "hardest defender of all time".

== Career statistics ==
=== Club ===
Appearances and goals by club, season and competition
Club	Season	League			Copa del Rey		Europe		Other (Note: Appearances in Copa de la Liga)		Total	
Club	Season	Division	Apps	Goals	Apps	Goals	Apps	Goals	Apps	Goals	Apps	Goals
Bilbao Athletic	1973–74	Tercera División	4	0	0	0	–		–		4	0
Bilbao Athletic	1974–75	Tercera División	21	8	0	0	–		–		21	8
Bilbao Athletic	Total		25	8	0	0	0	0	0	0	25	8
Athletic Bilbao	1974–75	La Liga	0	0	2	0	–		–		2	0
Athletic Bilbao	1975–76	La Liga	27	4	1	0	–		–		28	4
Athletic Bilbao	1976–77	La Liga	10	0	2	0	4 (Note: Appearances in UEFA Cup)	0	–		16	0
Athletic Bilbao	1977–78	La Liga	4	1	0	0	3	0	–		7	1
Athletic Bilbao	1978–79	La Liga	10	1	3	0	0	0	–		13	1
Athletic Bilbao	1979–80	La Liga	30	3	12	4	–		–		42	7
Athletic Bilbao	1980–81	La Liga	27	4	9	1	–		–		36	5
Athletic Bilbao	1981–82	La Liga	31	6	7	0	–		0	0	38	6
Athletic Bilbao	1982–83	La Liga	24	4	5	0	1	0	2	0	32	4
Athletic Bilbao	1983–84	La Liga	28	2	7	0	4 (Note: Appearances in European Cup)	1	0	0	39	3
Athletic Bilbao	1984–85	La Liga	31	3	6	2	2	0	2	0	41	5
Athletic Bilbao	1985–86	La Liga	31	5	6	1	6	0	–		43	6
Athletic Bilbao	1986–87	La Liga	24	2	5	0	3	0	–		32	2
Athletic Bilbao	Total		277	35	65	8	23	1	4	0	369	44
Atlético Madrid	1987–88	La Liga	13	0	4	0	–		–		17	0
Atlético Madrid	1988–89	La Liga	14	0	8	0	0	0	–		22	0
Atlético Madrid	1989–90	La Liga	8	0	0	0	2	0	–		10	0
Atlético Madrid	Total		35	0	12	0	2	0	0	0	49	0
Career total			337	43	77	8	25	1	4	0	443	52

=== International ===
Scores and results list Spain's goal tally first, score column indicates score after each Goikoetxea goal.

List of international goals scored by Andoni Goikoetxea
No.	Date	Venue	Opponent	Score	Result	Competition
1	26 May 1984	Charmilles, Geneva, Switzerland	Switzerland	4–0	4–0	Friendly
2	14 November 1984	Hampden Park, Glasgow, Scotland	Scotland	1–2	1–3	1986 World Cup qualification
3	18 June 1986	La Corregidora, Querétaro, Mexico	Denmark	3–1	5–1	1986 FIFA World Cup
4	15 October 1986	Niedersachsenstadion, Hanover, Germany	West Germany	2–2	2–2	Friendly

== Honours ==
=== Player ===
Athletic Bilbao

- La Liga: 1982–83, 1983–84
- Copa del Rey: 1983–84
- Supercopa de España: 1984

Spain

- UEFA European Championship runner-up: 1984

=== Manager ===
Spain U21

- UEFA European Under-21 Championship runner-up: 1996; third place 1994
