= Pascual Parra =

Spanish footballer

Personal information
- Full name: Pascual Luna Parra
- Date of birth: 27 February 1963 (age 63)
- Place of birth: Biar, Spain
- Height: 1.76 m (5 ft 9 1/2 in)
- Position: Defensive midfielder

Youth career
- Biarense
- Hércules

Senior career*
Years	Team	Apps	(Gls)
1980–1986	Hércules	116	(2)
1986–1988	Murcia	71	(0)
1988–1991	Mallorca	98	(1)
1991–1997	Hércules	150	(5)

International career
1980	Spain U16	3	(0)
1980–1981	Spain U18	11	(1)
- * Club domestic league appearances and goals

Pascual Luna Parra (born 22 February 1963) is a Spanish retired footballer who played as a defensive midfielder.

He played in 236 La Liga games over the course of ten seasons, mainly in representation of Hércules - being one of the players with more official matches in the club's history - and Mallorca.

== Club career ==
Parra was born in Biar, Province of Alicante. A product of local Hércules CF's youth system, he made his first-team - and La Liga - debuts at only 17, his first appearance being on 6 September 1980 in a 1–2 away loss against RCD Español. In his first two seasons combined he played in 23 games with the main squad, being relegated in 1981–82.

After experiencing both one promotion and relegation with the Valencian, Parra signed for Real Murcia in the top flight, being an undisputed starter during his two-season stint (more than 3,000 minutes of action in each). Subsequently, in the 1988 summer, he joined RCD Mallorca in Segunda División, appearing and starting in 25 games in his first season as the club returned to the main category.

Parra helped the Balearic Islands outfit reach the final of the 1991 Copa del Rey, playing the entire final against Atlético Madrid (0–1 extra time loss). A mere months into the 1991–92 season, he left the club and returned to Hércules, in Segunda División B, helping to promotion in his first full campaign.

Parra only featured in six games in 1995–96 as the Herculanos returned to the top division after a ten-year absence. He was played significantly more in the following season, but the team was immediately relegated back, following which he retired from football at the age of 34.

From 1998–2003, Parra acted as Hércules' director of football, later occupying the same position at neighbours Benidorm CD, then losing all connection with the football world.

== International career ==
Parra won 14 caps for two Spanish youth teams.

== Honours ==
Mallorca

- Copa del Rey: Runner-up 1990–91

Hércules

- Segunda División: 1995–96
