= La Ribera de Salamanca =

Coordinates: 41°12′14″N 6°39′27″W

- Comarca
- Location in Salamanca
- Country: Spain
- Autonomous community: Castile and León
- Province: Salamanca
- Comarca: Comarca de Vitigudino
- Capital: Aldeadávila de la Ribera

Area
  - Total: 344.7 km^{2} (133.1 sq mi)

Population (2014)
  - Total: 3,949
  - Density: 11.46/km^{2} (29.67/sq mi)
- Time zone: UTC+1 (CET)
  - Summer (DST): UTC+2 (CEST)

La Ribera de Salamanca commonly referred to as "Las Arribes" is a subcomarca in the comarca of Vitigudino in the province of Salamanca, Castile and León. It contains seven municipalities: Aldeadávila, Masueco, Mieza, Pereña, Saucelle, Villarino de los Aires and Vilvestre.
