= Patxi Ferreira =

Spanish footballer

Personal information
- Full name: Francisco Ferreira Colmenero
- Date of birth: 22 May 1967 (age 59)
- Place of birth: Saucelle, Spain
- Height: 1.81 m (5 ft 11 1/2 in)
- Position: Centre-back

Youth career
- Deusto
- 1983–1984: Athletic Bilbao

Senior career*
Years	Team	Apps	(Gls)
1984–1987	Bilbao Athletic	73	(7)
1984–1989	Athletic Bilbao	76	(10)
1989–1995	Atlético Madrid	118	(4)
1993–1994	→ Sevilla (loan)	25	(1)
1995–1997	Valencia	60	(4)
1997–2000	Athletic Bilbao	67	(3)
2000–2001	Rayo Vallecano	12	(0)
Total		431	(29)

International career
1983	Spain U16	4	(0)
1984–1985	Spain U18	10	(0)
1985	Spain U19	1	(0)
1985	Spain U20	4	(0)
1986–1990	Spain U21	12	(0)
1988–1989	Spain	2	(0)
1990–1997	Basque Country	4	(0)

Managerial career
- 2012–2015: Eibar (assistant)
- 2015: Valladolid (assistant)
- 2016–2017: Deportivo La Coruña (assistant)
- 2017–2018: Bilbao Athletic (assistant)
- 2018–2021: Athletic Bilbao (assistant)
- 2021–2023: Eibar (assistant)
- 2023–2024: Almería (assistant)
- 2024–2026: Cádiz (assistant)
- * Club domestic league appearances and goals

Francisco 'Patxi' Ferreira Colmenero (born 22 May 1967) is a Spanish former professional footballer who played as a central defender.

== Club career ==
Ferreira was born in Saucelle, Province of Salamanca, and moved to the Bilbao area at a young age, making him eligible for to play for Athletic Bilbao under their signing policy. While a member of the youth system at Lezama, he won the Copa del Rey Juvenil in 1984.

Having not yet featured for the reserves, Ferreira made his La Liga debut on 9 September 1984 aged 17 years and 110 days in a 3–0 away defeat against Sevilla FC, a club record as the youngest player in the competition. A strike by the professional players had forced the organisations to field their youngsters ahead of schedule, and he did not play another league game with the first team for two years; his record stood until Iker Muniain's debut, in August 2009.

During a steady professional career, Ferreira also represented Atlético Madrid, Sevilla, Valencia CF and Rayo Vallecano. He made 515 official appearances in his 17 years at senior level, 358 in the top division alone, scoring 22 goals in the competition; career highlights included winning the Copa del Rey twice in a row with Atlético in the early 90s, and featuring in three group-stage matches of the 1998–99 UEFA Champions League with Athletic. Having achieved three runner-up league finishes (1991, 1996 and 1998), his best individual season was with the latter in 1987–88 under Howard Kendall, as the 20-year-old netted six times in 35 matches to help the Basques to fourth position.

Ferreira retired in 2001 at the age of 34, after a slow year with Rayo – the side from the Madrid outskirts finished in 14th position, and he appeared in less than one third of the league matches. He subsequently became a coach, working as assistant to Gaizka Garitano at SD Eibar; in June 2016, the pair joined Deportivo de La Coruña.

One year later, Ferreira returned to Bilbao Athletic alongside Garitano when the latter was appointed manager. They continued to work together at that club's first team, Eibar, UD Almería and Cádiz CF.

== International career ==
Ferreira played twice for Spain in as many friendlies, the first being a 2–1 loss with Yugoslavia in Oviedo on 14 September 1988.

== Honours ==
Atlético Madrid

- Copa del Rey: 1990–91, 1991–92

Spain U20

- FIFA U-20 World Cup runner-up: 1985
