= Saucelle =

- Municipality
- Flag Coat of arms

- Location in Salamanca

- Location in Spain
- Coordinates: 41°02′51″N 6°45′11″W
- Country: Spain
- Autonomous community: Castile and León
- Province: Salamanca
- Comarca: Vitigudino
- Subcomarca: La Ribera de Salamanca

Government
  - Mayor: Diego Antonio Ledesma Ayuela (People's Party)

Area
  - Total: 46 km^{2} (18 sq mi)
- Elevation: 665 m (2,182 ft)

Population (2025-01-01)
  - Total: 242
  - Density: 5.3/km^{2} (14/sq mi)
- Time zone: UTC+1 (CET)
  - Summer (DST): UTC+2 (CEST)
- Postal code: 37257

Saucelle is a municipality located in the province of Salamanca, Castile and León, Spain. As of 2025 the municipality has a population of 266 inhabitants.
