= Joan Fageda =

Spanish politician

Joan Fageda Aubert ((Spanish: Juan; Olot, Catalonia, Spain, 20 January 1937) is a Spanish politician based in Mallorca in the People's Party. He was the mayor of Palma de Mallorca from 1991 to 2003.

He is now a senator in the Spanish senate.
