= Villarino de los Aires =

- Municipality
- Coat of arms

- Location
- Coordinates: 41°16′10″N 6°28′09″W
- Country: Spain
- Autonomous Community: Comunidad Autónoma de Castilla y León
- Province: Salamanca
- Comarca: Vitigudino
- Subcomarca: La Ribera de Salamanca
- Founded: 13th century

Government
  - Mayor: Julián Martín Jiménez (People's Party)

Area
  - Total: 103 km^{2} (40 sq mi)
- Elevation: 605 m (1,985 ft)

Population (2025-01-01)
  - Total: 727
  - Density: 7.06/km^{2} (18.3/sq mi)
- Time zone: UTC+1 (CET)
  - Summer (DST): UTC+2 (CEST)
- Postal code: 37160
- Area code: 34 (Spain) + 923 (Salamanca)
- Website: www.villarinodelosaires.es

Villarino de los Aires is a large municipality in the province of Salamanca, western Spain, part of the autonomous community of Castile-Leon. It is located in the very north of the province and as of 2016 has a population of 869 people.

== Geography ==
The municipality covers an area of 103 km².

It lies 605 meters above sea level and lies on the River Duero.

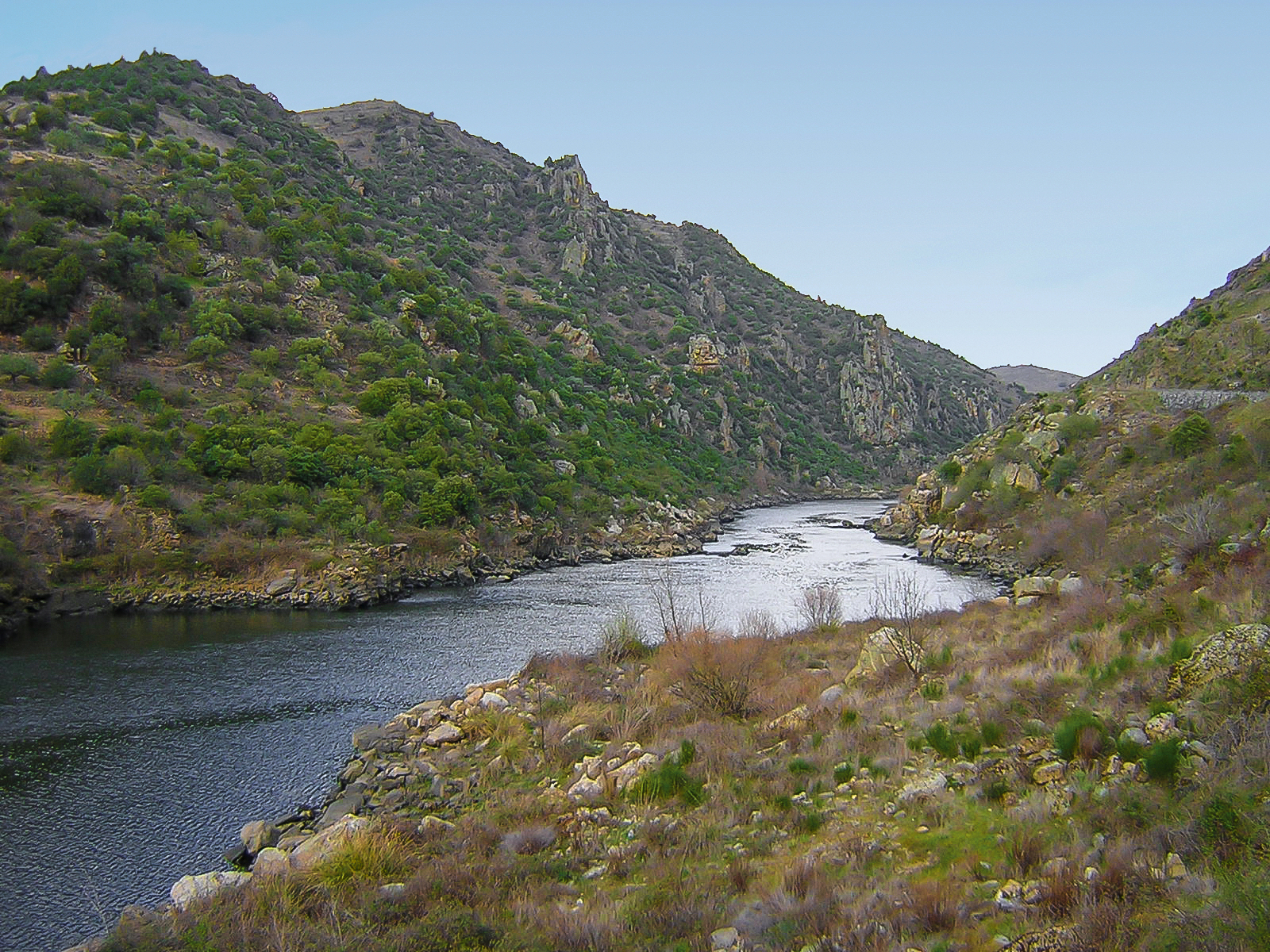
Duero River

== See also ==
List of municipalities in Salamanca
