= Antonio Orejuela =

Spanish footballer

Personal information
- Full name: Antonio José Orejuela Rivero
- Date of birth: 2 December 1960 (age 65)
- Place of birth: Madrid, Spain
- Height: 1.69 m (5 ft 6 1/2 in)
- Position: Midfielder

Youth career
- 1968–1978: Ilsbach

Senior career*
Years	Team	Apps	(Gls)
1978–1982	TSV Hanau		
1982–1983	FSV Frankfurt	30	(4)
1983–1984	Salamanca	33	(9)
1984–1988	Mallorca	142	(17)
1988–1993	Atlético Madrid	73	(8)
1993–1994	Rayo Vallecano	29	(3)
1994	Granada	6	(0)
1994–1995	Mallorca	14	(0)
1996–1997	Atlético Baleares		
Total		327	(41)

International career
1987	Spain U21	1	(0)
1987–1988	Spain U23	4	(0)
- * Club domestic league appearances and goals

Antonio José Orejuela Rivero (born 2 December 1960) is a Spanish former professional footballer who played as a midfielder.

Over the course of nine seasons, he amassed La Liga totals of 211 games and 31 goals in representation of four clubs, mainly Atlético Madrid (five years).

== Club career ==
After immigrating with his parents to the country at the age of six, Madrid-born Orejuela began his professional career in Germany, playing in the 2. Bundesliga with FSV Frankfurt. He returned to his homeland in 1983, starting out at UD Salamanca and RCD Mallorca – he went on to suffer relegation from La Liga with both clubs; he made his debut in the competition with the former, featuring the full 90 minutes in a 0–0 away draw against CA Osasuna on 4 September 1983.

Ahead of 1988–89, Orejuela signed for Atlético Madrid. He was regularly used in the first two of his five seasons at the Vicente Calderón Stadium, but suffered greatly with injuries in the other three (just 12 matches in total) precisely as the team from the capital won back-to-back Copa del Rey trophies, in 1991 and 1992.

Orejuela then spent 1993–94 with neighbours Rayo Vallecano, appearing more but being again relegated from the top flight. He subsequently returned to Mallorca for a further campaign, now in the Segunda División, and retired at 36 following a spell in the lower leagues.

== Honours ==
Atlético Madrid

- Copa del Rey: 1990–91, 1991–92
