= Baltazar (footballer, born 1959) =

Brazilian footballer

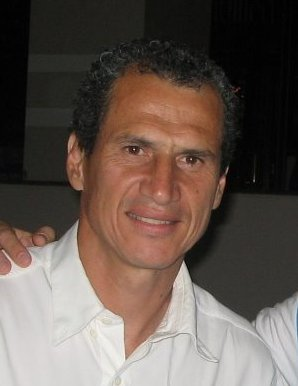
- Baltazar in 2008

Personal information
- Full name: Baltazar Maria de Morais Júnior
- Date of birth: 27 July 1959 (age 67)
- Place of birth: Goiânia, Brazil
- Height: 1.80 m (5 ft 11 in)
- Position: Striker

Senior career*
Years	Team	Apps	(Gls)
1978–1979	Atlético Goianiense		
1979–1982	Grêmio	78	(46)
1982	Palmeiras		
1983	Flamengo	26	(13)
1984	Palmeiras	11	(2)
1984–1985	Botafogo	18	(1)
1985–1988	Celta	92	(47)
1988–1990	Atlético Madrid	77	(53)
1990–1991	Porto	19	(2)
1991–1993	Rennes	34	(6)
1993–1995	Goiás	18	(11)
1995–1996	Kyoto Purple Sanga	30	(28)

International career
1980–1989	Brazil	6	(2)
- * Club domestic league appearances and goals

Baltazar Maria de Morais Júnior (born 27 July 1959), known simply as Baltazar, is a Brazilian former professional footballer who played as a striker.

During an 18-year professional career he played, other than in his country, in Spain, Portugal, France and Japan, winning several individual scoring honours. He appeared with the Brazil national team that won the 1989 Copa América.

== Club career ==
Born in Goiânia, Goiás, Baltazar started playing with hometown club Atlético Goianiense. He signed for Grêmio in 1979, going on to score in double digits during his entire four-season spell a recording a best of 14 in 1980 while being an instrumental attacking unit in the team's back-to-back Gauchão conquests; in the 1981's Série A final against São Paulo, after missing a penalty kick in the first leg (2–1 home win), he scored the only goal in the second match for a first-ever national championship conquest.

In the following four years, Baltazar played for Palmeiras (two spells), Flamengo and Botafogo, netting 13 times for the second side in another Brazilian championship conquest. He had his first abroad experience aged 26, being relegated from the Spanish La Liga with RC Celta de Vigo.

In 1986–87, Baltazar propelled the Galicians back into the top level by scoring a career-best 34 goals, also a best-ever in the second division. In a game in December, he accidentally collided with CD Málaga goalkeeper José Antonio Gallardo who died days later from a cerebral haemorrhage; he mourned the death which some had blamed him for.

Baltazar only found the net on six occasions in the following season, but the club retained its league status. He subsequently stayed in the country and joined Atlético Madrid, scoring 35 goals in 36 contests in his first season – his second Pichichi in three years – and adding 18 in the following; however, after the emergence of younger Manolo, the 31-year-old was deemed surplus to requirements by manager Tomislav Ivić and, in November 1990, signed for FC Porto in Portugal, being used almost exclusively as a substitute during his only season.

Until his retirement at the age of 37 in 1996, Baltazar played for Stade Rennais (France), Goiás and Kyoto Purple Sanga (Japan).

== International career ==
Baltazar played for Brazil at the 1989 Copa América which was held on home soil, appearing in three group stage matches for the eventual winners (including the 0–0 against Colombia as a starter). However, during nearly one full decade, he only earned a total of six caps and scored two goals.

== Post-retirement ==
Highly religious, Baltazar was nicknamed O Artilheiro de Deus (God's striker). He became a minister after retiring from football, settling in his hometown and fathering two children.

== Career statistics ==
=== Club ===
Appearances and goals by club, season and competition
Club	Season	League			State league		National cup (Note: Includes Copa del Rey.)		League cup (Note: Includes Copa de la Liga.)		Continental	
Club	Season	Division	Apps	Goals	Apps	Goals	Apps	Goals	Apps	Goals	Apps	Goals
Atlético Goianiense	1979	Série A	0	0	1	2	—		—		—	
Atlético Goianiense	1980	Série A	0	0	17	19	—		—		—	
Atlético Goianiense	Total		0	0	18	21	0	0	0	0	0	0
Grêmio	1979	Série A	16	10	29	19	—		—		—	
Grêmio	1980	Série A	18	14	40	28	—		—		—	
Grêmio	1981	Série A	21	10	33	20	—		—		—	
Grêmio	1982	Série A	23	12	1	0	—		—		—	
Grêmio	Total		78	46	103	67	0	0	0	0	0	0
Palmeiras	1982	Série A	0	0	28	14	—		—		—	
Palmeiras	1983	Série A	0	0	17	6	—		—		—	
Palmeiras	1984	Série A	11	2	0	0	—		—		—	
Palmeiras	Total		11	2	45	20	0	0	0	0	0	0
Flamengo	1983	Série A	26	13	8	5	—		—		6	3
Botafogo	1984	Série A	0	0	22	12	—		—		—	
Botafogo	1985	Série A	18	1	0	0	—		—		—	
Botafogo	Total		18	1	22	11	0	0	0	0	0	0
Celta	1985–86	La Liga	32	6	—		8	5	2	1	—	
Celta	1986–87	Segunda División	44	34	—		3	3	—		—	
Celta	1987–88	La Liga	16	7	—		5	6	—		—	
Celta	Total		92	47	0	0	16	14	2	1	0	0
Atlético Madrid	1988–89	La Liga	36	35	—		8	6	—		2	1
Atlético Madrid	1989–90	La Liga	38	18	—		2	0	—		2	1
Atlético Madrid	1990–91	La Liga	3	0	—		0	0	—		2	0
Atlético Madrid	Total		77	53	0	0	10	8	0	0	6	2
Porto	1990–91	Primeira Liga	19	2	—		4	1			—	
Rennes	1991–92	Ligue 1	34	6	—						—	
Rennes	1992–93	Ligue 2	0	0	—						—	
Rennes	Total		34	6	0	0	0	0	0	0	0	0
Goiás	1993	Série A	0	0	2	9	—		—		—	
Goiás	1994	Série B	18	11	15	19	—		—		—	
Goiás	Brazil		18	11	17	28	0	0	0	0	0	0
Kyoto Purple Sanga	1995	Football League	27	28	—						—	
Kyoto Purple Sanga	1996	J1 League	3	0	—						—	
Kyoto Purple Sanga	Total		30	28	0	0	0	0	0	0	0	0
Career total			403	209	213	151	30	23	2	1	12	5

=== International ===
Appearances and goals by national team and year
National team	Year	Apps	Goals
Brazil	1980	1	0
Brazil	1981	2	1
Brazil	1982	0	0
Brazil	1983	0	0
Brazil	1984	0	0
Brazil	1985	0	0
Brazil	1986	0	0
Brazil	1987	0	0
Brazil	1988	0	0
Brazil	1989	3	1
Total		6	2

== Honours ==
Grêmio

- Campeonato Brasileiro Série A: 1981
- Campeonato Gaúcho: 1979, 1980

Flamengo

- Campeonato Brasileiro Série A: 1983

Porto

- Taça de Portugal: 1990–91

Goiás

- Campeonato Goiano: 1994

Brazil

- Copa América: 1989

Individual

- Campeonato Goiano top scorer: 1978, 1994
- Campeonato Gaúcho top scorer: 1980, 1981
- Campeonato Carioca top scorer: 1984
- Campeonato Brasileiro Série B top scorer: 1994
- Pichichi Trophy: 1986–87 (Segunda División), 1988–89
- La Liga Team of The Year: 1989
