= Armando Lucas =

Spanish footballer (born 1966)

Armando
Personal information
- Full name: José Armando Lucas Contreras
- Date of birth: 20 October 1966 (age 60)
- Place of birth: Madrid, Spain
- Height: 1.74 m (5 ft 9 in)
- Positions: Midfielder; left back

Senior career*
Years	Team	Apps	(Gls)
1985–1986	Alcorcón		
1986–1987	Leganés		
1987–1988	Atlético Madrid B	24	(0)
1988–1990	Atlético Madrid	42	(1)
1990–1992	Mallorca	30	(0)
1992–1994	Atlético Marbella	75	(0)
1994–1995	Badajoz	20	(0)
1995–1996	Getafe	18	(0)
Total		209+	(1+)
- * Club domestic league appearances and goals

José Armando Lucas Contreras (born 20 October 1966), known as simply Armando, is a Spanish former professional footballer who played as a midfielder or left back. He played 72 La Liga games for Atlético Madrid and Mallorca, adding 113 in the Segunda División for Atlético Marbella, Badajoz and Getafe.

== Career ==
Born in Madrid, Armando began playing in the Tercera División for local Community of Madrid teams Alcorcón and Leganés before joining Atlético Madrileño, the reserve team of Atlético Madrid. He made his debut for the first team in La Liga on 24 January 1988 in a 2–1 home win over Cádiz, and totalled 11 games over the season, scoring his only top-flight goal on 7 May as the first equaliser in a 4–3 win at Valencia.

In June 1990, Lucas moved to RCD Mallorca after being transfer-listed by Atlético manager Joaquín Peiró. The four-year deal had initially been held up by a breakdown in relations between the two clubs. On 29 June 1991, he played the Copa del Rey final, a 1–0 loss after extra time to his previous club.

After Mallorca's relegation to the Segunda División, Lucas moved in July 1992 to Atlético Marbella of the same league. His new team were sponsored by Jesús Gil, president of Atlético Madrid. Two years later he joined Badajoz, and he returned to his native region in 1995 to play one last second-tier season for Getafe.
