= Agustín Elduayen =

Spanish footballer

Personal information
- Full name: Agustín de Carlos Elduayen
- Date of birth: 4 August 1964 (age 62)
- Place of birth: San Sebastián, Spain
- Height: 1.86 m (6 ft 1 in)
- Position: Goalkeeper

Youth career
- Real Sociedad

Senior career*
Years	Team	Apps	(Gls)
1982–1984	San Sebastián		
1983–1986	Real Sociedad	28	(0)
1986–1990	Atlético Madrid	39	(0)
1990–1993	Real Burgos	106	(0)
1993–1996	Deportivo La Coruña	3	(0)
1996–1999	Valladolid	3	(0)
Total		179	(0)

International career
1982	Spain U16	2	(0)
1985–1986	Spain U21	3	(0)
- * Club domestic league appearances and goals

Agustín de Carlos Elduayen (born 4 August 1964) is a Spanish retired footballer who played as a goalkeeper.

== Club career ==
Born in San Sebastián, Elduayen made his professional debuts with local Real Sociedad, being barred by legendary Luis Arconada. In the 1985–86 season, however, as the starter suffered a severe injury in the first La Liga game, he was chosen by manager John Toshack as his successor, and the Basques eventually finished in seventh position but with one of the worst defensive records in the competition (51 goals against with 34 matches from the player).

In the 1986 summer, Elduayen signed with fellow top flight club Atlético Madrid, starting in his first year but being relegated to the substitutes bench after the emergence of Abel Resino, who had been playing with the reserves.

He experienced his best years with Real Burgos CF, helping the lowly Castile and León side to three consecutive seasons in the first division. In 1991–92, as they finished in a best-ever ninth position, he played in all 38 games (3,338 minutes) and only conceded 43 goals, winning the Don Balón Award for Best Spanish Player in the process.

In 1993, after Burgos relegation, Elduayen signed for Deportivo de La Coruña for about 1 million pesetas. With Francisco Liaño firmly established as first-choice for Super Depor, he could only appear three times in the league in three seasons combined, subsequently leaving for Real Valladolid, where he met exactly the same fate in exactly the same period of time, retiring from the game at the age of 35.

Having spent 16 seasons in Spain's top division, Elduayen appeared in 179 games. Whilst at Burgos he was summoned by manager Vicente Miera to the Spain national team, but never made his debut.

== Honours ==
=== Club ===
Deportivo

- Copa del Rey: 1994–95
- Supercopa de España: 1995

=== Country ===
Spain U21

- UEFA European Under-21 Championship: 1986

=== Individual ===
- Don Balón Award – Best Spanish Player: 1992
