= Sergio Morgado =

Spanish footballer (born 1963)

Personal information
- Full name: Sergio Elías Morgado Rodríguez
- Date of birth: 16 September 1963 (age 63)
- Place of birth: Badajoz, Spain
- Height: 1.83 m (6 ft 0 in)
- Position: Centre back

Youth career
- Badajoz
- Atlético Madrid

Senior career*
| Years | Team | Apps | (Gls) |
| 1983–1986 | Atlético Madrid B | 73 | (3) |
| 1985–1990 | Atlético Madrid | 105 | (0) |
| 1990–1993 | Español | 53 | (0) |
| 1993–1995 | Badajoz | 32 | (0) |
| Total | | 263 | (3) |

International career
| 1985–1986 | Spain U21 | 4 | (0) |
| 1987 | Spain U23 | 2 | (0) |
- * Club domestic league appearances and goals

Sergio Elías Morgado Rodríguez (born 16 September 1963), also known simply as Sergio, is a Spanish former footballer who played as a centre back.

He played 158 games in La Liga for Atlético Madrid and Español over eight consecutive seasons. In Segunda División, he added 105 games and 3 goals for Atlético Madrileño and Badajoz at the start and end of his career.

In the 2000s, Morgado worked as a director of football at Espanyol and Albacete.

== Club career ==
Born in Badajoz in Extremadura, Morgado came through the youth ranks of Atlético Madrid after arriving from CD Badajoz. He made his debut for the reserve team in the Segunda División on 6 February 1983 in a 1–0 win at their Barcelona equivalents. In June, his team won the division's Copa de la Liga, and he played every minute of the 3–2 aggregate win over Deportivo de La Coruña.

On 6 November 1985, Morgado made his first-team debut in a 1–0 home win over Bangor City in the first round first leg of the UEFA Cup Winners' Cup. His first La Liga game was on 1 December in a goalless draw away to Real Zaragoza. His only goal of 136 total games for the main squad came on 29 May 1986, in a 2–0 win at the Vicente Calderón Stadium against Sestao River in the second leg of the first round of the Copa de la Liga. He played the full 120 minutes of the 1987 Copa del Rey final, which his team lost on penalties to Real Sociedad.

In July 1990, Morgado was linked with a move to Español, and said he would look forward to playing under their new manager Luis Aragonés, who had promoted him to the Atlético first team. He signed a three-year deal and was presented on the same day as Juan Carlos Núñez Benicio. He was a regular starter in his first season, sidelined by a knee injury in his second, and in his third season he was dropped by manager Novoa before being reinstated by Juanjo Díaz for the final five games. In his final game on 29 June 1993, the Pericos were relegated after losing a playoff to Racing Santander.

Morgado returned to his hometown club Badajoz in 1993, with the club in the Segunda División. He made his debut on 2 September in a Copa del Rey third-round game away to Peña Deportiva (3–0 win), followed by a 2–0 home win over Toledo three days later on his league bow.

== International career ==
Morgado played four games for Spain at under-21 level, starting on 11 June 1985 in a 1–0 win away to Iceland in a European qualifier. In late 1987, he played in defeats to Sweden and France for the under-23 team as they failed to qualify for the Olympic tournament.

== Post-playing career ==
In April 2001, Morgado returned to the renamed Espanyol on a three-year deal, as technical secretary. He arrived the following month as sporting director after his contract expired at Badajoz. He and manager Javier Clemente were fired in November 2003, with the latter defending their signings by pointing to the club's economic crisis.

In July 2009, Morgado was hired as director of football at Albacete, instantly appointing Pepe Murcia as manager. His two-year contract was terminated in February 2010, as the club sought to reinstate Antonio López Alfaro.

== Personal life ==
Morgado's son César Morgado is also a footballer in the same position. Born in 1993 while his father was playing in the city of Barcelona, he represented several third-tier clubs, including Badajoz.
