= Juan Carlos (footballer, born 1965) =

Spanish footballer

Personal information
- Full name: Juan Carlos Rodríguez Moreno
- Date of birth: 19 January 1965 (age 61)
- Place of birth: Puente Castro, Spain
- Height: 1.72 m (5 ft 7 1/2 in)
- Position: Left-back

Youth career
- Valladolid

Senior career*
Years	Team	Apps	(Gls)
1984–1987	Valladolid	77	(2)
1987–1991	Atlético Madrid	76	(0)
1991–1994	Barcelona	55	(0)
1994–1995	Valencia	14	(0)
1995–1999	Valladolid	75	(0)
Total		297	(2)

International career
1985–1986	Spain U21	7	(0)
1991	Spain	1	(0)

Managerial career
- 2002: Castile and León
- 2011–2012: Valladolid (youth)
- * Club domestic league appearances and goals

Juan Carlos Rodríguez Moreno (born 19 January 1965), known as Juan Carlos, is a Spanish former professional footballer who played as a left-back.

== Club career ==
Juan Carlos was born in Puente Castro, León. During his 15-year career, he represented Real Valladolid (two spells), Atlético Madrid, FC Barcelona and Valencia CF. With Barça, he featured the full 120 minutes of their 1–0 win over UC Sampdoria in the final of the 1991–92 European Cup, and was relatively utilised in three consecutive La Liga titles by the Catalans.

Juan Carlos played 364 games as a professional, always in the top division. He scored twice in the league while a member of Valladolid.

In 2008, Juan Carlos returned to Valladolid, working with the club in directorial capacities.

== International career ==
Juan Carlos earned one cap for the Spain national team, on 17 April 1991. He played the entire match in a 2–0 friendly loss against Romania in Cáceres.

== Honours ==
Atlético Madrid

- Copa del Rey: 1990–91

Barcelona

- La Liga: 1991–92, 1992–93, 1993–94
- Supercopa de España: 1991, 1992
- European Cup: 1991–92; runner-up: 1993–94

Valencia

- Copa del Rey runner-up: 1994–95

Spain U21

- UEFA European Under-21 Championship: 1986
