= Joaquín Parra (footballer) =

Spanish footballer and manager

Personal information
- Full name: Antonio Joaquín Parra Fernández
- Date of birth: 17 June 1961 (age 65)
- Place of birth: Seville, Spain
- Height: 1.75 m (5 ft 9 in)
- Position: Midfielder

Youth career
- 1973–1980: Betis

Senior career*
| Years | Team | Apps | (Gls) |
| 1979–1987 | Betis | 221 | (24) |
| 1987–1989 | Atlético Madrid | 47 | (5) |
| 1989–1991 | Real Madrid | 15 | (1) |
| 1992–1993 | Écija | 8 | (0) |
| Total | | 291 | (30) |

International career
| 1981–1982 | Spain U21 | 11 | (0) |
| 1988 | Spain U23 | 1 | (0) |

Managerial career
- 2000–2001: Coria (assistant)
- 2001: Coria
- 2004: Betis B
- 2004–2005: Betis C
- 2005–2006: Betis B
- * Club domestic league appearances and goals

Antonio Joaquín Parra Fernández (born 17 June 1961) is a Spanish former professional football midfielder and manager.

He played 283 matches and scored 30 goals over 11 seasons in La Liga, mainly playing for Betis (seven years). He also spent two years with Real Madrid.

== Club career ==
Born in Seville, Parra made his professional debut with his hometown club Real Betis at age 18, and played there until 1986–87, appearing in a career-best La Liga 44 games – all as a starter – that season, which had a second stage. He left the Andalusians with 283 competitive matches to his credit, including four in the UEFA Cup and 19 in the Copa de la Liga; he reached the final of the latter tournament in 1986, losing it to FC Barcelona 2–1 on aggregate.

Parra transferred to Atlético Madrid subsequently, where after a first year where he made 33 appearances and scored five goals for a third-place finish, he featured sparingly, which also occurred the following two seasons with Real Madrid (only 20 competitive games).

After an unsuccessful trial in Hungary with Budapest Honvéd FC, Parra signed for Écija Balompié in 1992, after which he retired. In the 2000s he took up coaching, with Betis' C and B teams as well as Coria CF, subsequently working in directorial capacities for the former club.

In October 2006, Parra joined Andalusia's coaching staff, led by José Enrique Díaz.
