= Campbell (surname) =

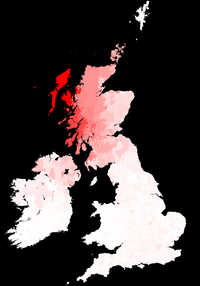
- Campbell surname map

Origin
- Region of origin: Scotland

Campbell is a Scottish surname —derived from the Gaelic roots cam ("crooked") and beul ("mouth")—that had originated as a nickname meaning "crooked mouth" or "wry mouthed". Clan Campbell, historically one of the largest and most powerful of the Highland clans, traces its origins to the ancient Britons of Strathclyde. Between 1200 and 1500, the Campbells emerged as one of the most powerful families in Scotland, dominant in Argyll and capable of wielding a wider influence and authority from Edinburgh to the Hebrides and western Highlands.

Today, the name is found throughout the world as a consequence of large-scale emigration from Scotland, from the 18th century onwards, and the settlement of the Scottish diaspora in many countries, particularly the United States, Canada and Australia. Due to significant Scottish immigration in the 17th and 18th centuries, the name is found within Ulster.

Campbell is the third most common surname in Northern Ireland, fourth most common in Jamaica, seventh most common in Scotland, 12th most common in Canada, 18th most common in Australia, 41st most common in the United States and 65th most common in England.

== Notable persons named Campbell ==
=== Several people ===
- Several people named Alan Campbell
- Several people named Alexander Campbell
- Several people named Alistair Campbell
- Several people named Allan Campbell
- Several people named Andrew Campbell
- Several people named Archibald Campbell
- Several people named Arthur Campbell
- Several people named Ashley Campbell
- Several people named Carol Campbell
- Several people named Catherine Campbell
- Several people named Chris Campbell
- Several people named Christine Campbell
- Several people named Charles Campbell
- Several people named Colin Campbell
- Several people named Daniel Campbell
- Several people named Dave Campbell
- Several people named David Campbell
- Several people named Donald Campbell
- Several people named Douglas Campbell
- Several people named Duncan Campbell
- Several people named Edward Campbell
- Several people named Eric Campbell
- Several people named Felicity Campbell
- Several people named Fiona Campbell
- Several people named Geoffrey Campbell
- Several people named George Campbell
- Several people named Glen Campbell
- Several people named Gordon Campbell
- Several people named Graeme Campbell
- Several people named Gregory Campbell
- Several people named Ian Campbell
- Several people named Jack Campbell
- Several people named James Campbell
- Several people named Jeff Campbell
- Several people named Jim Campbell
- Several people named Jimmy Campbell
- Several people named John Campbell
- Several people named Joseph Campbell
- Several people named Julia Campbell
- Several people named Ken Campbell
- Several people named Kevin Campbell
- Several people named Larry Campbell
- Several people named Lorne Campbell
- Several people named Luke Campbell
- Several people named Mary Campbell
- Several people named Michael Campbell
- Several people named Neil Campbell
- Several people named Patrick Campbell
- Several people named Paul Campbell
- Several people named Peter Campbell
- Several people named Phil Campbell
- Several people named Philip Campbell
- Several people named Robert Campbell
- Several people named Roy Campbell
- Several people named Samuel Campbell
- Several people named Scott Campbell
- Several people named Steven Campbell
- Several people named Thomas Campbell
- Several people named Timothy Campbell
- Several people named William, or Bill, Campbell

=== A–C ===
- A. B. Campbell (1881–1966), British naval officer and radio broadcaster
- Aaron Campbell (voice actor) (born 1991), American voice actor
- Aileen Campbell (born 1980), Scottish National Party member of the Scottish Parliament for Clydesdale and Minister for Local Government and Planning
- Alan Campbell, Baron Campbell of Alloway (1917–2013), British judge, barrister and writer
- Alastair Campbell (born 1957), British political editor and spokesman
- Albert Ralph Campbell (1875–1925), American Medal of Honor recipient
- Alexander Buchanan Campbell (1914–2007), Scottish architect
- Alfred Walter Campbell (1868–1937), English neuroanatomic scientist
- Ali Campbell (born 1959), singer-songwriter of the English reggae band UB40
- Ali Campbell (field hockey) (born 1991), American hockey player
- Allison A. Campbell (born 1963), American chemist
- Amare Campbell (born 2005), American football player
- Ami Campbell (born 1991), English cricketer
- Andy Campbell (born 1979), English footballer
- Ann-Marie Campbell (born 1965), Jamaican-American business executive
- Ballard C. Campbell (born 1940), American historian
- Barbara Campbell (born 1961), Australian artist
- Barry Campbell (born 1950), Canadian politician
- Bartley Campbell (1843–1888), American playwright
- Basil Campbell (born 1956), Australian rules footballer
- Beatrice Campbell (1922–1979), British actress
- Beatrix Campbell (born 1947), English writer and activist
- Bebe Moore Campbell (1950–2006), American novelist, journalist, teacher
- Ben Campbell (Houston mayor) (1858–1942), Mayor of Houston, Texas
- Ben Campbell (musician), New Zealand musician
- Ben Campbell (Scottish golfer) (born 1861), Scottish golfer
- Ben Campbell (New Zealand golfer) (born 1991), New Zealand professional golfer
- Ben Nighthorse Campbell (1933–2025), American politician
- Benedict Campbell (born 1957), Canadian actor
- Benjamin Campbell (consular agent) (1802–1859), British merchant and consular agent
- Bennett Campbell (1943–2008), Canadian politician
- Benton J. Campbell, American lawyer
- Bertha Pitts Campbell (1889–1990), American civil rights activist
- Bessie Campbell (1870–1964), Anglican Australian-born banjoist
- Beth Campbell (artist) (born 1971), American artist
- Beth Campbell (jurist), Australian magistrate
- Beth Newlands Campbell, Ex-president of Canadian pharmacy chain
- Bethany Campbell (1941–2022), American novelist
- Betty Campbell (1934–2017), Welsh community activist and headteacher
- Bick Campbell (1898–1961), American baseball umpire
- Big Bill Campbell (1891–1952), Canadian entertainer and broadcaster
- Bill Campbell (business executive) (1940–2016), American businessman and chairman
- Bill Campbell (mayor) (born 1953), American politician, mayor of Atlanta, Georgia
- Bill Campbell (baseball) (1948–2023), American baseball player
- Bill Campbell (rugby union), Australia international rugby union player
- Bill Campbell (gridiron football) (1920–1974), American gridiron football player
- Bill Campbell (sportscaster) (1923–2014), American sportscaster
- Bill Campbell (Victorian politician) (1920–1996), Australian politician
- Bill Campbell (footballer, born 1883) (1883–1954), Australian rules footballer
- Bill Campbell (footballer, born 1904) (1904–2007), Australian rules footballer
- Bill Campbell (California politician) (born 1942), American politician
- Bill Campbell (illustrator) (1920–2017), American cartoonist and illustrator
- Bill Campbell (Nova Scotia politician) (1919–2003), Canadian politician
- Bill Ransom Campbell (1920–1996), American architect
- Billy Campbell (born 1959), American actor
- Billy Campbell (Northern Irish footballer) (1944–2026), Northern Irish footballer
- Billy Campbell (TV executive) (born 1959), American television producer
- Billy Campbell (baseball) (1873–1957), American baseball player
- Billy Campbell (footballer, born 1920) (1920–1994), Scottish footballer
- Black Angus Campbell (1934–2005), Scottish professional wrestler
- Blaine Campbell (1940–2026), American politician
- Blair Campbell (1946–2020), Australian rules footballer and cricketer
- Blake Campbell (born 1982), Australian rules footballer
- Bland Hayden Campbell (1905–1989), American politician
- Blind James Campbell (1906–1981), American singer
- Bob Campbell (photographer) (1930–2014), English wildlife photographer and filmmaker
- Bob Campbell (American football) (born 1947), American football player
- Bob Campbell (Australian footballer) (1868–1946), Australian rules footballer
- Bob Campbell (soccer), Scottish-American soccer player
- Bobbi Campbell (1952–1984), American nurse and early AIDS activist
- Bobby Campbell (English footballer) (1937–2015), English footballer and manager
- Bobby Campbell (footballer, born 1922) (1922–2009), Scottish footballer and manager
- Bobby Campbell (Northern Irish footballer) (1956–2016), Northern Irish footballer
- Bobby Campbell (Scottish footballer) (born c. 1939), Scottish footballer
- Bobby Campbell (footballer, born 1941) (1941–2019), Scottish footballer
- Boniface Campbell (1895–1988), United States Army general
- Bonnie Campbell (politician) (born 1948), American lawyer
- Bonnie Jo Campbell (born 1962), American novelist
- Bonnie K. Campbell, Canadian political economist
- Bonny Campbell (1898–1987), Australian rules footballer
- Boudreaux Campbell (born 1998), American bull rider
- Brad C. Campbell (born 1975), Australian rules footballer
- Brad L. Campbell (born 1975), Australian rules footballer
- Bradford P. Campbell, American government official
- Bradley M. Campbell (born 1961), American lawyer
- Braeden Campbell (born 2002), Australian football league player
- Brandon Campbell (born 1991), American music composer
- Bret Campbell (born 1960), American basketball player and coach
- Brett Campbell (born 1981), American baseball player
- Brian Campbell (born 1979), Canadian ice hockey player
- Brian Campbell (game designer), American writer and game designer
- Bronte Campbell (born 1994), Australian swimmer
- Brookins Campbell (1808–1853), American politician
- Bruce Campbell (born 1958), American actor and filmmaker
- Bruce Campbell (barrister) (1916–1990), New Zealand-born British lawyer, judge and politician
- Bruce Campbell (baseball) (1909–1995), American baseball player
- Bruce Campbell (gridiron football) (born 1988), American football player
- Bruce Campbell (historian) (born 1949), British economic historian
- Bruce Campbell (ornithologist) (1912-1993) (1912–1993), English ornithologist, writer, and broadcaster
- Bruce Campbell (Australian footballer) (1890–1964), Australian rules footballer
- Bruce Campbell (Alberta politician) (1923–2011), Canadian politician
- Bruce Atta Campbell (1888–1954), British Army officer
- Brun Campbell (1884–1952), American composer and pianist
- Bryan Campbell (born 1944), Canadian ice hockey player
- Bryce Campbell (Australian footballer) (born 1984), Australian rules footballer
- Bryce Campbell (rugby union) (born 1994), American rugby union player
- Buddy Campbell (born 1943), American speed skater
- Bullet Campbell (1896–1968), American baseball player
- Burton Peter Campbell (1937–2007), Canadian politician
- Calais Campbell (born 1986), American football player
- Cason Campbell, American professional pickleball player
- Cassie Campbell (born 1973), Canadian former ice hockey player
- Cecil Bustamente Campbell, better known as Prince Buster (1938–2016), musician from Kingston, Jamaica
- Chad Campbell (born 1974), American golfer
- Chance Campbell (born 1999), American football player
- Charlotte C. Campbell (1914–1993), American medical mycologist
- Christian Campbell (born 1972), Canadian actor and brother of Neve Campbell
- Christiana Burdett Campbell (c. 1723–1792), colonial American innkeeper
- Clarence Campbell (1905–1984), Canadian ice hockey executive
- Clifton Campbell (born 1967), American sprinter
- Colen Campbell (1676–1729), Scottish neo-Palladian architect
- Conchita Campbell (born 1995), Canadian actress
- Cornell Campbell (born 1945), Jamaican reggae singer

=== D–H ===
- Daisy Campbell (actress, born 2003) (born 2003), English actress
- Dalevon Campbell (born 2001), American football player
- Danielle Campbell (born 1996), American actress
- Dante Campbell (born 1999), Canadian soccer player
- Darius Campbell Danesh (1980–2022), Scottish singer, songwriter
- Darren Campbell (born 1973), English Olympic sprinter
- Dayton Campbell, Jamaican politician
- Dean Campbell (born 2001), Scottish footballer
- De'Vondre Campbell (born 1993), American professional football linebacker
- DJ Campbell (born 1981), English footballer
- Kurtis Campbell, British DJ
- Don Campbell (ice hockey) (1925–2012), Canadian ice hockey player
- Dougie Campbell (1901–1991), Scottish-American soccer player
- Dugald Campbell (1858–1940), Scottish doctor
- Donald B. Campbell, Australian-born astronomer and professor of astronomy
- Duncan B. Campbell, British scholar of Greek and Roman warfare
- Earl Campbell (born 1955), American football player
- Eddie C. Campbell (1939–2018), American musician and singer
- Eddie Campbell (born 1955), Scottish graphic novelist, artist
- Eila Campbell (1915–1994), English geographer
- Elden Campbell (1968–2025), American basketball player
- Eliza Campbell (born 1995), Australian association footballer
- Elizabeth Duncan Campbell (1804–1878), Scottish poet and autobiographical writer
- Ella Campbell (1910–2003), New Zealand botanist
- Elspeth Campbell (1940–2023), British baroness and socialite
- Epsy Campbell Barr (born 1963), Presidential Candidate in Costa Rica
- Ernest T. Campbell (1923–2010), American Presbyterian clergyman
- Evelyn Campbell (actress) (1868–?), British-born American stage actress
- Ffyona Campbell (born 1967), British woman who was the first woman to walk around the world
- Fraizer Campbell (born 1987), English footballer
- Francis Eastwood Campbell (1823–1911), 2nd clerk of the New Zealand House of Representatives
- Frank Campbell (New York politician) (1858–1924), New York State comptroller 1892–93
- Fred Campbell (English footballer), English footballer
- Gene Campbell (1932–2013), American ice hockey player
- Georgia Campbell (1926–2004), American baseball player
- Gordon Campbell (disambiguation), several people
- Grace Campbell (writer) (1895–1963), Canadian writer
- Sir Guy Campbell, 1st Baronet (1786–1849), British Army officer of the Napoleonic era
- Greg Campbell (cricketer) (born 1964), Australian cricketer
- Harvey Campbell (Canadian football) (born c. 1940), Canadian football player
- Harvey Campbell (politician) (1792–1877), American politician
- Hazel Campbell (1940–2018), Jamaican writer
- Helen Stuart Campbell (1839–1918), American author, editor, social reformer, home economist
- Hélène Campbell (born 1991), Canadian activist
- Henry Campbell-Bannerman (1836–1908), prime minister
- Hugh Campbell (baseball) (1846–1881), Irish baseball player

=== I–L ===
- Ian MacDonald Campbell (1922–1994), engineer
- Isaiah Campbell (born 1997), American baseball player
- Isobel Campbell (born 1976), Scottish musician
- J. Campbell (footballer), English footballer
- J. Kenneth Campbell, American actor
- J. Scott Campbell (born 1973), comic book artist
- Jacquelyn Campbell (born 1946), American nurse
- Jane Campbell (soccer) (born 1995), American soccer player
- Jane L. Campbell (born 1953), first female mayor of Cleveland, Ohio
- Jane Maud Campbell (1869–1947), American librarian and social reformer
- Jason Campbell (born 1981), American football player
- Jayden Campbell (born 2000), Australian rugby league player
- Jean Campbell (baseball) (1927–2004), American baseball player
- Jean Helen St. Clair Campbell (?–1956)
- Jeannette Campbell (1916–2003), Argentine swimmer
- Jerry Campbell (1944–2017), American Canadian football player
- Jewett Campbell (1912–1999), American painter, teacher
- Jihaad Campbell (born 2004), American football player
- Joel Campbell (born 1992), Costa Rican footballer * John Campbell (cricketer) (born 1993), Jamaican cricketer
- Jon Campbell (producer), singer-songwriter and producer of The Time Frequency
- Jonathan A. Campbell (born 1947), American herpetologist
- Judith Campbell, mistress of John F. Kennedy
- Keith Campbell (cricketer) (born 1943), New Zealand cricketer
- Kelon Campbell (born 1995), American influencer and comedian known online as Psyiconic
- Kieran Campbell (born 1979), Irish rugby union player
- Kim Campbell (pilot) (born 1975), US Air Force A-10 pilot
- Kim Campbell (born 1947), first female prime minister of Canada
- Kristian Campbell (born 2002), American baseball player
- LeRoy Campbell (1915–2007), American football player
- Liza Campbell (born 1959), Scottish artist, calligrapher, columnist and writer
- Lola Campbell (born 2010 or 2011), British child actress
- Louis Campbell (born 1979), American basketball player
- Lyle Campbell (born 1942), linguist

=== M–R ===
- Malcolm Campbell (1885–1948), British holder of world land and water speed records
- Maria Campbell (born 1939), Native American author of Canadian descent
- Marsha Campbell (born 1946), American politician from Missouri
- Martin Campbell (born 1943), New Zealand director
- Marvin Campbell (gymnast) (born 1961), British gymnast
- Marvin Campbell (politician) (1849–1930), American politician from Indiana
- Matt Campbell (racing driver) (born 1995), Australian racing driver
- Maurice Campbell (1919–2014), Canadian curler
- Maurice S. Campbell (1869 or 1870–1942), American silent film director
- Melanie L. Campbell, American voting rights activist
- Menzies Campbell (1941–2025), British politician, advocate and athlete
- Merritt L. Campbell (1864–1915), American politician
- Milt Campbell (1933–2012), American decathlete
- Minnie Julia Beatrice Campbell (1862–1952), Canadian clubwoman, lecturer, and editor
- Murray Campbell, computer scientist
- Nan Campbell (1926–2013), American politician
- Naomi Campbell (born 1970), British supermodel, actress and singer
- Natalie Campbell (born 1982), New Zealand curler
- Nate Campbell (born 1972), American boxer
- Nellie Campobello (originally spelled Campbell) (1900–1986), Mexican writer
- Neve Campbell (born 1973), Canadian actress
- Nicky Campbell (born 1961), Scottish TV journalist and presenter
- Nicola I. Campbell, Indigenous Canadian author, poet, and educator
- Nina Campbell (born 1945), English interior designer
- Norman Campbell (director) (1924–2004), Canadian composer
- Norman Robert Campbell (1880–1949), English physicist and measurement theorist
- Oliver Campbell (1871–1953), American tennis player
- Paris Campbell Grace (born 1992), American comedian, singer, and internet celebrity
- Parris Campbell (born 1997), American football player
- Patricia Grizzaffi Campbell (1963–2000), American planetary scientist
- Preston Campbell (born 1977), Australian rugby league player
- Preston W. Campbell (1874–1954), American lawyer and judge
- Ralph E. Campbell (1867–1921), American attorney and district judge
- Ramsey Campbell, British horror writer
- Randy Campbell (born 1946), American football player
- Rebecca Campbell (scientist), neuroendocrinologist
- Reginald Campbell Thompson (1876–1941), British archaeologist
- Reginald Campbell (1894–1950), British writer
- Reginald John Campbell (1867–1956), British cleric and theologian
- Remaye Campbell (born 2000), English footballer
- Rosemary Campbell (born 1944), New Zealand painter
- Ryan Campbell (born 1972), Australian cricketer

=== S–Z ===
- Sabine Hyland (née Campbell) (born 1964), American anthropologist
- Selvin Campbell, birth name of boxer Lefty Satan Flynn
- Shannon Campbell (born 1996), Australian rules footballer
- Sharon Campbell, British diplomat
- Sherwin Campbell (born 1970), Barbadian cricketer
- Sidney S. Campbell (1909–1974), English organist
- Simone Campbell (born 1945), feminist nun
- Skip Campbell (1948–2018), American politician
- Sol Campbell (born 1974), English footballer (soccer player)
- Sophie Campbell, American comic book creator
- T. Colin Campbell (1934), American biochemist
- Tara Campbell (born 1983), Canadian water polo player
- Terran Campbell (born 1998), Canadian soccer player
- Terry Campbell (born 1968), Canadian-born German ice hockey player
- Tevaughn Campbell (born 1993), American football player
- Tevin Campbell (born 1976), American music artist
- Thomas Lopton Campbell Jr. (1809–1893), 19th-century American pioneer and Texas Ranger
- Tilden Campbell (1908–1963), American college sports coach
- Tim Campbell (actor) (born 1975), ex-Home and Away star and host of Million Dollar Wheel of Fortune
- Tisha Campbell (born 1968), American actress
- Todd J. Campbell (1956–2021), American judge
- Trey Campbell, American singer-songwriter
- Tunis Campbell (1812–1891), African-American politician in Reconstruction Georgia
- Tyger Campbell (born 2000), American basketball player
- Tyson Campbell (born 2000), American football player
- V. Floyd Campbell (1873–1906), American illustrator
- Veronica Campbell Brown (born 1982), Jamaican sprinter
- Vivian Campbell (born 1962), Northern Irish rock guitarist
- Wendy Campbell-Purdie (1925–1985), New Zealand tree-planter
- William Campbell (disambiguation), multiple people
- Winston Campbell (born 1991), Honduran discus thrower
- Yolande Dolly Fox Campbell, American actress, producer, and philanthropist

== Fictional characters ==
- Annie Campbell, from the Australian soap opera Home and Away
- Erik Campbell (Final Destination), from Final Destination Bloodlines
- Fionna Campbell, from Adventure Time and Adventure Time: Fionna and Cake
- Lincoln Campbell, from Marvel's Agents of S.H.I.E.L.D.
- Minerva Campbell, from Adventure Time
- Hughie Campbell, and Hugh Campbell Sr., two related characters from The Boys
- Pete Campbell, a character from Mad Men

== See also ==
- Campbell (disambiguation)
- Clan Campbell, a Scottish clan
- Clan Campbell of Cawdor, a Scottish clan
