= Joseph Campbell (disambiguation) =

Joseph Campbell (1904–1987) was an American mythologist.

Joseph or Joe Campbell may also refer to:

== Sports ==
- Joe Campbell (footballer, born 1894) (1894–1976), English footballer, played for Heywood Utd, Oldham Athletic, Wigan Borough, Blackburn Rovers, Rochdale, Stalybridge Celtic, Morecambe and Great Harwood
- Joseph Campbell (footballer) (1903–?), English footballer
- Joe Campbell (footballer, born 1925) (1925–1980), Scottish footballer
- Joe Campbell (Australian footballer) (1893–1982), Australian rules footballer
- Joe Campbell (golfer) (1935–2024), American golfer
- Joe Campbell (baseball) (born 1944), American professional baseball player
- Joe Campbell (American football, born 1955) (1955–2023), American football player
- Joe Campbell (American football, born 1966), American football player

== Other ==
- Joseph Campbell (poet) (1879–1944), Irish lyricist
- Joseph Campbell (accountant) (1900–1984), American comptroller general
- Joseph Campbell (judge) (born 1949), Australian judge
- Joe Campbell (actor) (died 2005), American actor
- Joseph A. Campbell (1817–1900), founder of the Campbell Soup Company
- Joseph B. Campbell (1833 or 1836–1891), American politician from Alaska in the 1870s
- Joseph L. Campbell (1942–2011), roadie for The Allman Brothers Band, AKA the Legendary Red Dog
- J. W. R. Campbell (Joseph William Robert Campbell, 1853–1935), Irish Methodist minister and educator
- Joseph Campbell (archdeacon) (1856–1933), Anglican priest and mineralogist in Australia
- Joseph Campbell (20th-century Maine politician) (died 1999), American politician from Maine
- Joseph Campbell (21st-century Maine politician), American politician from Maine
- Joe Campbell (Georgia politician) (born 1952), American politician from Georgia

== See also ==
- Joseph Campbell Butler (born 1941), musician
- Campbell (surname)
