= Lorne =

Lorne is a given name and place name especially popular in Canada, due to the Marquess of Lorne, who was Governor General of Canada (1878–1883). Lorne may refer to:

== People ==
=== Given name ===
- Lorne Anderson (1931–1984), Canadian hockey player
- Lorne Atkinson (1921–2010) Canadian cyclist
- Lorne Babiuk (born 1946), Canadian scientist
- Lorne Balfe (born 1976), composer
- Lorne Bonnell (1923–2006), Canadian politician
- Lorne Calvert (born 1952), Canadian politician
- Lorne Campbell (disambiguation)
- Lorne Cardinal (born 1964), Canadian actor
- Lorne Carr (1910–2007), Canadian hockey player
- Lorne Chabot (1900–1946), Canadian hockey player
- Lorne Clarke (judge) (1928–2016), Canadian judge
- Lorne Currie (1871–1926), British sailor
- Lorne Davis (1930–2007), Canadian hockey player and scout
- Lorne L. Dawson, Canadian sociologist of religion
- Lorne Duguid (1910–1981), Canadian hockey player
- Lorne Elias, Canadian chemist and inventor
- Lorne Elliott (born 1974), Canadian comedian
- Lorne Entress, American musician
- Lorne Ferguson (1930–2008), Canadian hockey player
- Lorne Frohman, Canadian comedy writer and producer; see Pink Lady (TV series)
- Lorne Greenaway (1933–2010), Canadian politician
- Lorne Greene (1915–1987), Canadian-born television actor
- Lorne Henderson (1920–2002), Canadian politician
- Lorne Henning (born 1952), Canadian hockey executive
- Lorne Kusugak, Canadian politician
- Lorne Lanning (born 1964), American game designer
- Lorne Lofsky (born 1954), Canadian jazz musician
- Lorne Loomer (1937–2017), Canadian rower
- Lorne Mayencourt (born 1957), Canadian politician
- Lorne Michaels (born 1944), Canadian-born television producer
- Lorne Molleken (born 1956), Canadian hockey player
- Lorne Nystrom (born 1946), Canadian politician
- Lorne Peterson, Canadian special effect artist
- Lorne Reznowski (1929–2011), Canadian politician
- Robert Lorne Richardson (1860–1921), Canadian journalist
- Lorne Rombough (1948–2019), Canadian ice hockey player
- Lorne Rubenstein (born 1948), Canadian sports journalist
- Lorne Sam (born 1984), American football player
- Lorne Saxberg (1958–2006), Canadian television anchorman
- Lorne Spicer (born 1965), British television presenter
- Lorne Stamler (born 1951), Canadian hockey player
- Lorne Taylor (born 1944), Canadian politician
- Lorne Trottier (born 1948), Canadian businessman
- Lorne Welch (1916–1998), British engineer and pilot
- Lorne Gump Worsley (1929–2007), Canadian hockey player

=== Surname ===
- Dúghall of Lorne (died 1403), Scottish prelate
- Marion Lorne (1883–1968), American actress
- Tommy Lorne (1890–1935), Scottish comedian
- Marquess of Lorne, courtesy title for the heir to the Dukedom of Argyll

== Fiction ==
- Lorne (Angel), fictional character in the television series Angel
- Evan Lorne, fictional character in the television series Stargate SG-1 and Stargate Atlantis
- Lorne Malvo, fictional character in the television series Fargo

== Places ==
=== Australia ===
- Lake Lorne, Victoria
- Lorne, Victoria
- Lorne, New South Wales, near Camden Haven River

=== Canada ===
- Rural Municipality of Lorne, Manitoba
- Lorne, New Brunswick, a local service district in Restigouche County
- Lorne Parish, New Brunswick, in Victoria County
- Lorne (electoral district), Northwest Territories
- Lorne Park, Ontario
- Mount Lorne, Yukon
- Mount Lorne (electoral district), Yukon Territory

=== Scotland ===
- Firth of Lorn
- Lorne, Scotland

=== United States ===
- Lorne, Minnesota
- Lorne, Virginia

== Other uses ==
- Lorne plateau lavas
- Lorne sausage, a traditional Scottish large square sausage served in slices
- Marquess of Lorne, courtesy title for the Duke of Argyll's eldest son and heir, currently Archibald Campbell, Marquess of Lorne
- Lorne: The Man Who Invented Saturday Night Live, a 2025 biography about Lorne Michaels
- Lorne (film), a documentary about Lorne Michaels

== See also ==
- Loren (disambiguation)
- Lorneville (disambiguation)
