= Frederick Campbell =

Frederick Campbell may refer to:

- Fred Campbell (Australian footballer) (born 1979), Australian rules footballer
- Fred Campbell (Australian politician) (1911–1995), member of the Queensland Legislative Assembly
- Fred Campbell (basketball) (1920–2008), American basketball player and coach
- Fred Campbell (English footballer)
- Fred Campbell (Idaho politician) (1830–1913), American politician from Idaho
- Lord Frederick Campbell (1729–1816), Scottish nobleman
- Frederick Campbell, 3rd Earl Cawdor (1847–1911), British politician
- Frederick Campbell (British Army officer, born 1780) (1780–1866), general in the British Army
- Frederick Campbell (British Army officer, born 1860) (1860–1943), general in the British Army
- Frederick F. Campbell (born 1943), American Roman Catholic bishop
- Frederick George Campbell (1853–1929), American sheep breeder and rancher
- Frederick William Campbell (1867–1915), Canadian recipient of the Victoria Cross
- Frederick William Campbell (genealogist) (1782–1846), Scottish genealogist
- Frederick Campbell (cricketer) (1843–1926), Scottish cricketer and British Army officer

== See also ==
- Sir Henry Frederick Campbell (1769–1856), British Army general
