= Harvey Campbell =

Harvey Campbell may refer to:

- Harvey Campbell (Canadian football) (born 1940), Canadian football player
- Harvey Campbell (politician) (1792–1877), American physician and politician
