= Grace Campbell (disambiguation) =

Grace Campbell may refer to:

- Grace Campbell (1883–1943), American politician
- Grace Campbell (author) (1895–1963), Canadian writer
- Grace Campbell Stewart (died 1863), British miniature painter
- Grace Campbell (footballer) (born 1995), Australian rules footballer
- Grace Campbell (comedian) (born 1994), a British comedian
