= Catherine Campbell (disambiguation) =

Catherine Campbell (born 1963) is a New Zealand cricketer.

Catherine Campbell (or similar) may also refer to:

- Katherine Campbell, Countess of Crawford (1517–1578), Scottish noblewoman
- Katherine Campbell (accused witch) (c. 1677 – 1697), accused witch executed in Paisley, Scotland
- Kathryn Campbell, Australian public servant
- Kathy Campbell (born 1946), American politician in Nebraska
- Cathy Campbell (c. 1962–2012), New Zealand journalist
- Kathryn Campbell (karateka) (born 1990), Canadian karateka
- Cate Campbell (born 1992), Australian swimmer
- Kate Campbell (born 1961), American folk singer/songwriter
- Kate Campbell (politician), Scottish politician
- Kate Isabel Campbell (1899–1986), Australian physician and paediatrician
- Kay Campbell (1904–1975), American actress

== See also ==
- Mary Katherine Campbell (1905–1990), Miss America 1922 and 1923
- Catherine Campbell Sword Stewart (1881–1957), New Zealand politician
- Kathleen Campbell (disambiguation)
- Campbell (surname)
- Campbell (disambiguation)
