= Kelon =

Kelon may refer to:

- Kēlōn or Shadoof, an irrigation tool
- Hisense Kelon or Kelon, a Chinese appliance manufacturer
- Kelon language, a Papuan language of Indonesia
- Kelon Campbell, an influencer and comedian known online as Psyiconic
- a class of composite material; see, for example, Percussion mallet
- the Breton name of Chelun, Brittany, France
- Kelon Thomas (born 2000), Canadian football player

== See also ==
- Kelong, a type of offshore platform found in Southeast Asia
