= Andrew Campbell =

Andrew Campbell may refer to:

== Sports ==
- Andrew Campbell (rower) (born 1992), American rower
- Andrew Campbell (outfielder) (born 1992), Australian baseball player
- Andrew Campbell (ice hockey) (born 1988), Canadian ice hockey player
- Andrew Campbell (sailor) (born 1984), American yachtsman
- Andrew Campbell (cricketer) (born 1949), former English cricketer and barrister
- Andy Campbell (born 1979), English football player
- Andy Campbell (basketball) (born 1956), Australian Olympic basketball player
- Andrew Campbell (catcher) (1875–?), pre-Negro leagues baseball player
- Andrew Campbell (golfer) (c. 1887–?), Scottish golfer
- Andy Campbell (curler) (born c. 1956), Australian curler
- Andy Campbell (speedway rider) (born 1959), English speedway rider

== Other ==
- Andrew Campbell (legal scholar), Scottish academic, solicitor, writer and editor
- Andrew Campbell (bishop) (died 1769), Irish Roman Catholic prelate
- Andrew G. Campbell, American biologist
- Andrew J. Campbell (1828–1894), American politician from New York
- Andrew K. Campbell (1821–1867), American Civil War officer
- Andrew Campbell (priest) (born 1946), Irish-born Ghanaian Catholic missionary
- Andrew Campbell (computer scientist) (born 1959), British computer scientist
- Andrew Campbell, 19th-century miller, barkeep, and namesake of Campbellsville, Kentucky
