= Timothy Campbell =

Tim or Timothy Campbell may refer to:

- Tim Campbell (activist) (1939–2015), a gay activist and newspaper publisher
- Tim Campbell (actor) (born 1975), Australian actor and singer
- Tim Campbell (businessman) (born 1979), winner of the first series of the British version of The Apprentice
- Timothy J. Campbell (1840–1904), New York politician

== See also ==
- Campbell (surname)
