= Marvin Campbell =

Marvin Campbell may refer to:

- Marvin Campbell (gymnast) (born 1961), British gymnast
- Marvin Campbell (politician) (1849–1930), American politician
