= Chris Campbell =

Chris Campbell may refer to:

- Chris Campbell (artist) (born 1952), American artist
- Chris Campbell (wrestler) (born 1954), American wrestler
- Chris Campbell (golfer) (born 1975), Australian golfer
- Christian Campbell (cornerback) (born 1995), American football cornerback
- Chris Campbell (diplomat), British diplomat
- Christopher Campbell, Assistant Secretary of the Treasury for Financial Institutions
- Christopher Campbell (painter) (1908–1972), Irish artist
- Christian Campbell (born 1972), Canadian-American actor, writer, and photographer
- Christian Campbell (poet) (born 1979), Trinidadian-Bahamian poet, essayist and cultural critic
- Chris Campbell (politician) (born 1963), member of the Indiana House of Representatives
- Chris Campbell (composer) (born 1979), American composer
