= Peter Campbell =

Peter Campbell may refer to:

== Sportspeople ==
- Peter Campbell (Australian footballer, born 1875) (1875–1948), Australian rules footballer for Carlton
- Peter Campbell (Australian footballer, born 1938), Australian rules footballer for Geelong
- Peter Campbell (golfer) (born 1985), Canadian professional golfer
- Peter Campbell (Greenock Morton footballer) (1875–1948), Scottish footballer (Greenock Morton, Burton Swifts and Scotland)
- Peter Campbell (Rangers footballer) (1857–1883), Scottish footballer (Rangers, Blackburn Rovers and Scotland)
- Peter Campbell (tennis) (born 1950), Australian tennis player
- Peter Campbell (water polo) (born 1960), American water polo player

== Others ==
- Patrick Campbell (British Army officer, born 1684) (1684–1751), also known as Peter Campbell, British Army general and member of parliament
- Peter Campbell (naval officer) (1780–c. 1832), founded the Uruguayan Navy
- Peter Walter Campbell (1926–2005), gay English Conservative Party libertarian
- Peter J. Campbell (1857–1919), American lawyer and politician
- Peter M. Campbell (1872–1954), member of the Legislative Assembly of Alberta
- Peter Campbell (engineer) (1932–2021), British structural engineer
- Peter Colin Campbell (1810–1876), Scottish clergyman and principal of the University of Aberdeen
- Pete Campbell (born 1934), born Peter Dyckman Campbell, a character played by Vincent Kartheiser in the American TV series Mad Men
