= Donald Campbell (traveller) =

Scottish traveller

Donald Campbell (1751 – 5 June 1804), of Barbreck, Argyll, was a Scottish traveller in India and the Middle East.

== Life ==
Campbell was captain of a Cavalry regiment stationed in the Carnatic Sultanate. On his way over to India, he was shipwrecked while on the way to Madras. Soldiers of Hyder Ali, ruler of the Kingdom of Mysore, captured him and he was imprisoned in Nagara, Karnataka, chained to a man named Hall. The latter died and his body was left, chained to Campbell, for several days. When General Matthew approached, Campbell was released so he could participate in negotiations on behalf of Hyder's General Hyat Singh. Despatched to Bombay and Madras, he travelled, by sea and land, and in Calcutta negotiated with Warren Hastings. Afterward he visited Madras and China, and returned to England in 1785.

In 1795, in London, he published A Journey over land to India...by Donald Campbell of Barbreck, based in part on the letters he wrote to his son, Frederick William Campbell. A new edition appeared in 1796, in quarto, like the first; in the same year an abridged version was published, in octavo, with the title Narrative of Adventures and a preface signed' 'S. J.' The third part of the travels, relating to Campbell's shipwreck and imprisonment, was published as a Chapbook, Shipwreck and Captivity of D. C. (London, 1800).

He also published Letter to the Marquis of Lorn on the Present Times (London, 1798), protesting party factions in connection with the war with France.

Campbell died at Hutton, Essex, on 5 June 1804.
