= Julie Campbell =

Julie Campbell may refer to:

- Julie Campbell Tatham (1908–1999), pen name Julie Campbell, American writer of children's novels
- Julie Campbell (vascular biologist) (born 1946), Australian vascular biologist
- Julie Campbell (musician), music artist from Manchester, England, also known as LoneLady
- Julie-Ann Campbell, Australian lawyer and trade unionist, and Secretary of the Queensland branch of the Australian Labor Party

== See also ==
- Julia Campbell (disambiguation)
- Juliet Campbell (disambiguation)
