= Douglas Campbell =

Douglas Campbell may refer to:

- Douglas Lloyd Campbell (1895–1995), premier of Manitoba, 1948–1958
- Douglas Campbell (actor) (1922–2009), Scottish-born Canadian actor and director
- Douglas Campbell, Green Party candidate for governor in Michigan
- Douglas Houghton Campbell (1859–1953), American botanist
- Douglas Munro Campbell (1889–1986), politician in Ontario, Canada
- Douglas Campbell (aviator) (1896–1990), American World War I flying ace
- Douglas R. Campbell (born 1945), Canadian federal judge
- Douglas Campbell (soil conservator) (1906–1969), New Zealand teacher and soil conservator
- Douglas Campbell (swimmer) (born 1960), Scottish swimmer
- Doug Campbell (musician), American guitarist
- Doug Campbell (Iowa politician), American politician
- Dougie Campbell (1901–1991), Scottish-American soccer player
- Dugald Campbell, Scottish doctor who set up a national health service in Hawaii
- Douglas Campbell (British Army officer) (1899–1980), British Army general
- Douglas Graham Campbell (1866–1918), British colonial administrator
- Douglas C. Campbell, COO of Sears Canada

== See also ==
- William Douglas Campbell, lobbyist and FBI informant 2017–2018, associated with the Uranium One controversy
