= Laurence Campbell (sculptor) =

Irish sculptor (1911–2001)

- Laurence Campbell with his bust of Seán Heuston
- Born: 1911; Dublin, Ireland
- Died: 2001 (aged 89–90); Chicago, United States
- Occupation: sculptor

Laurence Campbell (1911–2001) was an Irish sculptor. Campbell was known for his busts for politicians and artists including Michael Collins and Maud Gonne, and his religious works.

== Life ==
Bust of Seán Heuston, Phoenix Park, Dublin

Christopher Campbell was born in Dublin in 1911. His parents were John, a carpenter, of 18 Hardwicke Street, and Ellen Campbell (née Farrell). He had four brothers and three sisters. His older brother was the painter, Christopher Campbell. Their father died when Campbell was a child. He attended CBS, St Mary's Place, going on to take up a stonecarving apprenticeship with Sharpe & Emlys, monumental sculptors, of Great Brunswick Street. From 1927 at the Dublin Metropolitan School of Art where he studied under Oliver Sheppard. While still a student he created a bust of Maud Gonne MacBride, which is now held in the Hugh Lane Gallery. He won the Taylor scholarship in 1933 and in 1934 the Henry Higgins travelling scholarship, with which he studied at Royal Academy of Fine Arts in Stockholm under Nils Sjorsen, and in Paris at the Academy Ranson being taught by Aristide Maillol.

Campbell was appointed acting professor of sculpture at the National College of Art when he returned to Dublin in 1938, teaching Domhnall Ó Murchadha. He resigned in 1946. He was elected to the Royal Hibernian Academy in 1940, becoming keeper in 1941. He exhibited regularly with the RHA between 1930 and 1955. He served as an executive committee of the Irish Exhibition of Living Art in 1943.

He also created limestone panels for buildings including the Marino vocational school and Theatre Royal, Dublin. He was also commissioned to create wooden carvings for churches and other religious buildings.

He emigrated to the United States in the 1960s, after which little is known about his life. His last known address was Deprato Statuary, Chicago.

Many sources record his death as 1964, though others state 2001.

== Works ==
- Bronze plaques depicting Kevin O'Higgins, Arthur Griffith, and Michael Collins on the cenotaph, Leinster Lawn, Dublin
- Memorial to Seán Heuston, Phoenix Park (1943)
- Melanie Le Brocquy bust
- Michael Scott bust
- Jack B. Yeats bust
- Portrait of William McNeely (1946)
