= Paul Campbell =

Paul Campbell may refer to:

== Actors ==
- Paul Campbell (American actor) (1923–1999), American film actor
- Paul Campbell (Canadian actor) (born 1979), Canadian actor
- Paul Campbell (Jamaican actor) (born 1959), Jamaican film and theatre actor

== Sportspeople ==
- Paul Campbell (American football) (1926–2005)
- Paul Campbell (cricketer) (born 1968), New Zealand cricketer
- Paul Campbell (first baseman) (1917–2006), American baseball player, manager and executive
- Paul Campbell (footballer) (born 1980)
- Paul Campbell (pitcher) (born 1995), American baseball player

== Others ==
- Paul G. Campbell Jr. (born 1946), American politician
- Paul Campbell (entrepreneur) (born 1959), British entrepreneur and musician
