= Margaret Seguier =

Margaret Seguier (née Stewart; 1795–1870) was a British miniature painter.

== Biography ==
Seguier was the eldest daughter of Anthony Stewart, 1773–1846, a portrait and miniature painter from Crieff in Perthshire and of Janet Weir whose father, Alexander Weir, was also a painter. Their father taught both Margaret and her younger sister, Grace Campbell Stewart, to paint. Margaret is praised in contemporary accounts for her portrait miniatures but no artistic record or specific attributions exist. Margaret married John Seguier, 1785–1856, who was a picture restorer and supintendent at the British Institution. They had a son, Peter Seguier who became a successful author, writing A Critical and Commercial Dictionary of the Work of Painters.
