= Geoffrey Campbell =

Geoffrey or Geoff Campbell may refer to:

- Geoff Campbell, Home and Away character
- Geoffrey Campbell, Chair of DRDGOLD Limited
- Geoffrey Campbell, killed in The Troubles in Newry

== See also ==
- Jeff Campbell (disambiguation)
- Geoffrey Campbell Gunter (1879–1961), Jamaican governor
