= Mark Cooper (politician) =

American politician

Member of the Maine House of Representatives from the 107th district
- Incumbent
- Assumed office December 3, 2024
- Preceded by: Jane Pringle
- Succeeded by: Joseph Campbell (elect)

Personal details
- Party: Republican
- Website: www.markcooperforme.com

Mark C. Cooper is an American politician. He has served as a member of the Maine House of Representatives since December 2024. He represents the 107th district which contains the town of Windham, Maine. Cooper is a building contractor and farmer by profession. In 2026, he was unseated by Joseph Campbell.
