= Christine Campbell =

Christine Campbell is the name of:

- Christine Campbell (character), title character in sitcom The New Adventures of Old Christine, portrayed by Julia Louis-Dreyfus
- Christine Campbell (politician) (born 1953), Labor member of the Victorian Legislative Assembly
- Christine Campbell (rower) (born 1964), American silver medallist at the 1987 World Rowing Championships
- Christine Campbell (singer), British soprano

== See also ==
- Christine Campbell Thomson (1897–1985), British horror fiction writer
