= Juliet Campbell =

Juliet Campbell may refer to:

- Juliet Campbell (sprinter) (born 1970), retired Jamaican sprinter
- Juliet Campbell (diplomat) (born 1935), retired British diplomat
- Juliet H. Lewis Campbell (1823–1898), American author
- Juliet Campbell (politician), British MP for Broxtowe

== See also ==
- Julia Campbell (disambiguation)
- Julie Campbell (disambiguation)
