= Glen Campbell (disambiguation) =

Glen Campbell (1936–2017) was an American country musician.

Glen(n) Campbell may also refer to:

== People ==
- Glen Campbell (actor) (born 1964), Jamaican actor and comedian
- Glenn Ross Campbell (born 1946), American guitarist based in the UK
- Glenn Campbell (broadcaster) (born 1976), Scottish journalist
- Glen Campbell (curler) (1916–2005), Canadian curler
- Glenn Campbell (American football) (1904–1973), American football end

== Other ==
- Glen Campbell, Pennsylvania, town
- "Glen Campbell (Space Ghost Coast to Coast)", an episode of Space Ghost Coast to Coast
- Glen Travis Campbell (album), a 1972 album by Glen Campbell

== See also ==
- Campbell (surname)
