= GLC Voice =

- Founder: Tim Campbell
- Language: English
- City: Minneapolis
- Country: United States

GLC Voice was a monthly (and later bi-monthly) LGBTQ publication in Minneapolis, Minnesota which ran from 1979 to 1992.

== History ==
GLC Voice was founded by Tim Campbell after he worked for a publication known as Positively Gay, which was published in Saint Paul between June and October 1979.

In October 1979, the publication was renamed GLC Voice and ran until April 1992. The tagline of the paper was “News and opinion for gays, lesbians and civilized straights”, though it also used the phrase “The newspaper from the Twin Cities gay and lesbian community.” GLC Voice was distributed free and bi-weekly on college campuses, in gay bars, bookstores, and on the streets. Campbell referred to the work he did with the publication as "advocacy journalism" and over 15,000 copies of the newspaper were published. The paper advocated for condom usage to prevent the spread of HIV/AIDS. In 1987, GLC Voice criticized the Minnesota Department of Health for downplaying the effectiveness of condoms.

Campbell closed GLC Voice "almost abruptly" in 1992.

Issues from both Positively Gay and GLC Voice are held at the Gale Family Library at the Minnesota History Center in St. Paul, Minnesota.

== See also ==
- Tim Campbell
- LGBTQ rights in Minnesota
