= Bertha Pitts Campbell =

American civil rights activist (1889–1990)

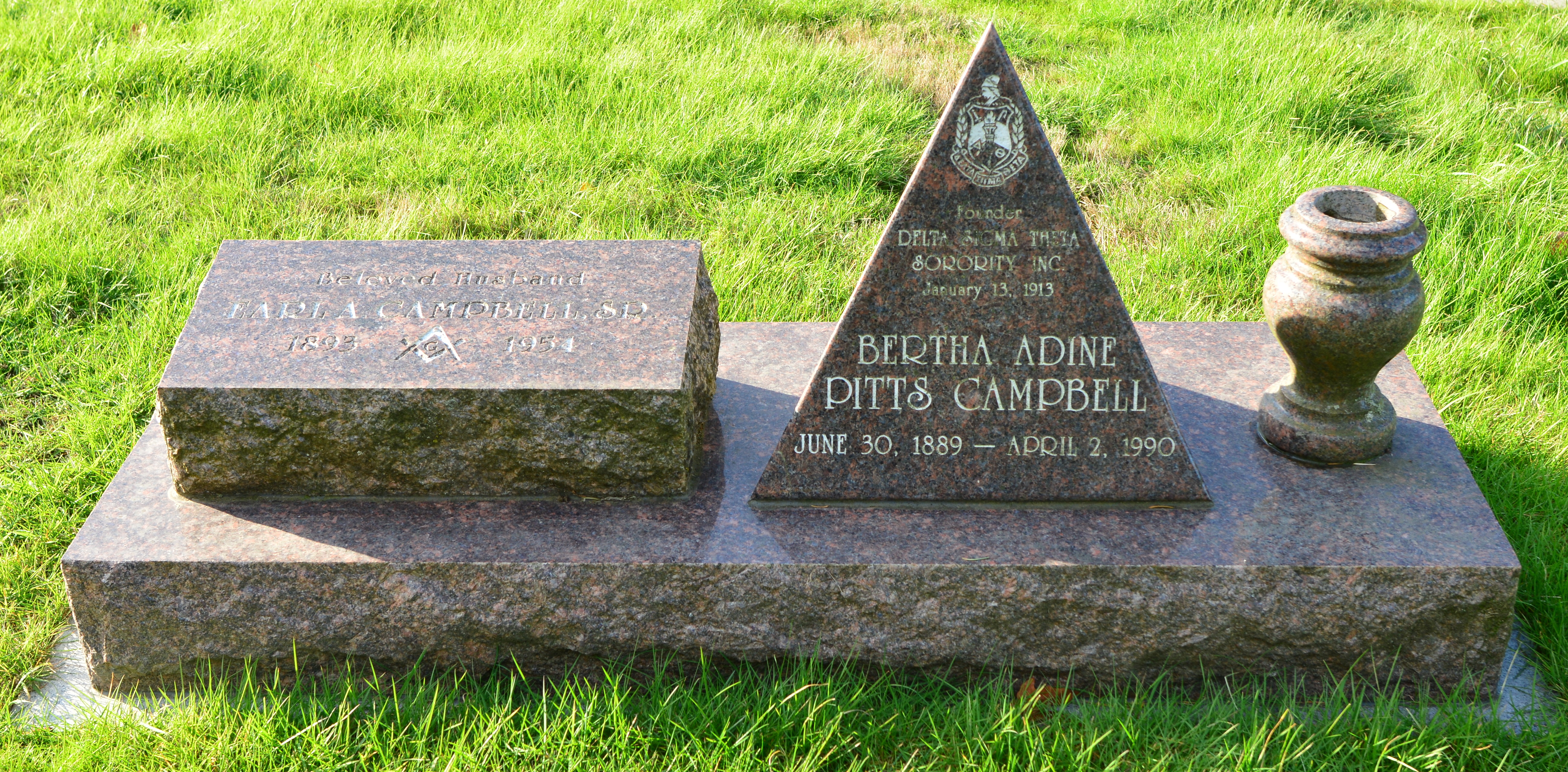
- Campbell's grave at Mount Pleasant Cemetery in Seattle, photographed 2020.
- Born: June 30, 1889; Winfield, Kansas
- Died: April 2, 1990 (aged 100); Seattle, Washington
- Resting place: Mount Pleasant Cemetery, Seattle
- Education: Montrose High School (1908); Howard University (B.A., 1913)
- Known for: Co-founder of Delta Sigma Theta, civil rights activist and organizer in Seattle

Bertha Pitts Campbell (June 30, 1889 – April 2, 1990) was a civil rights activist and one of the 22 founding members of Delta Sigma Theta sorority.

== Early life ==
Campbell was born on June 30, 1889, in Winfield, Kansas. Her mother was Ida Lewis and her father was Hubbard Sydney Pitts.

She spent most of her childhood in Colorado where her family lived with her grandmother, Eliza Butler, a former slave who worked as a laundress.

== Education ==
Campbell was the only black student enrolled in Montrose High School when she graduated as valedictorian of the class of 1908. Upon graduation, Campbell was offered a four-year scholarship to Colorado College. Campbell declined the scholarship and chose instead to enroll in Howard University in Washington, D.C., in 1908, where she received financial support from the Congregational Church.

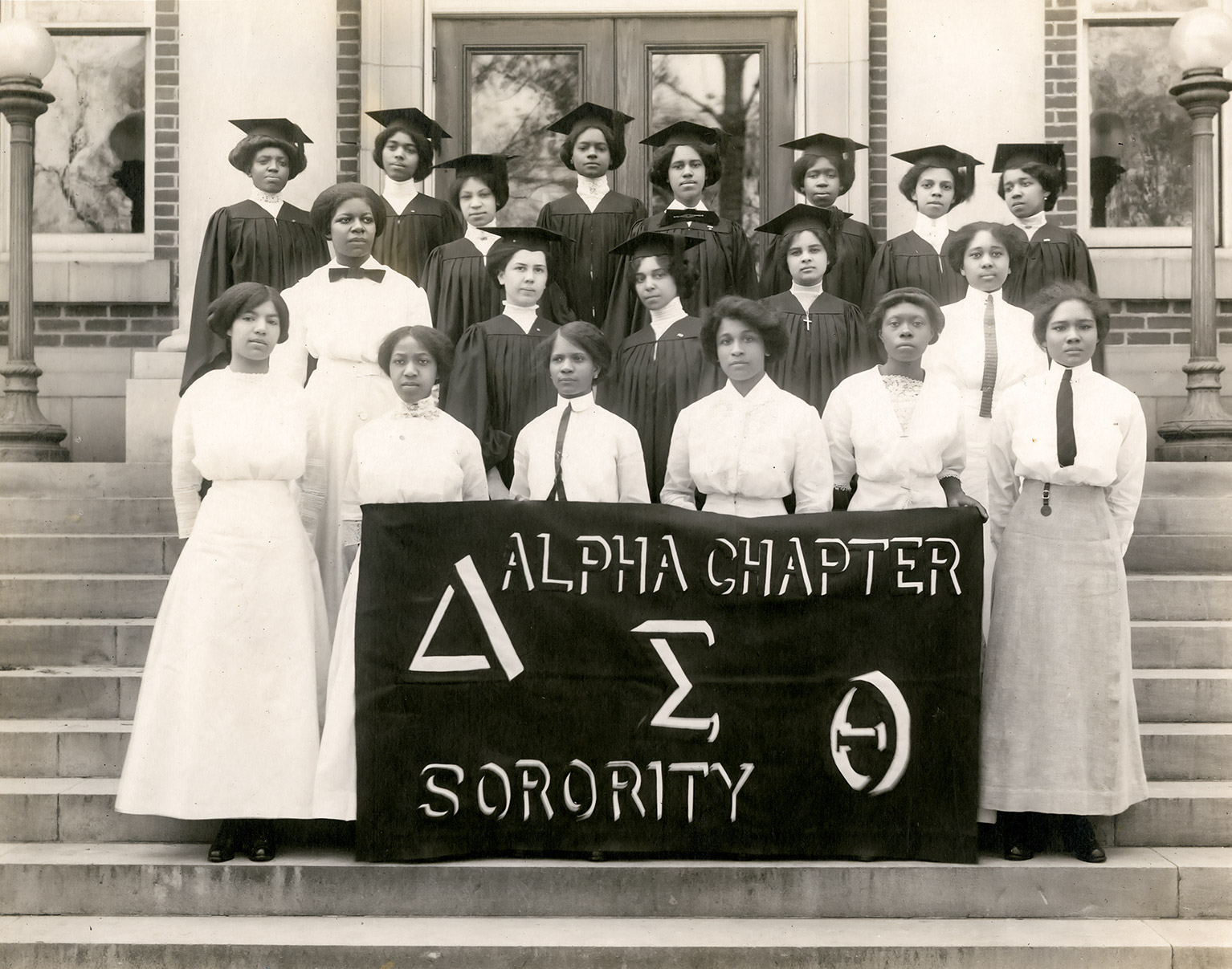
Delta Sigma Theta founders, 1913, at Howard University. Bertha Pitts: Last row, third from right.

In 1913, she co-founded the Delta Sigma Theta sorority at Howard and took part in the Woman Suffrage Procession in Washington, D.C. In June of that year, she graduated cum laude from Howard University with a bachelor of arts degree in education. She then taught for two years in Topeka.

== Family ==
She married Earl Campbell, a railroad worker and later government worker, in 1917. The couple spent some time in Colorado, then moved to Seattle in 1923. They had one son, Earl Jr who was killed in an industrial accident in 1951. Earl Sr. died of a heart attack in 1954.

== Activism and later years ==
In Seattle, Campbell was a committed activist and organizer. She was a charter member of the Christian Friends for Racial Equality, an organization which worked to expand housing and other opportunities for the black community; she worked with the Seattle Urban League; and was the first black member of the board of directors of the YWCA of Seattle-King County. She was an active member of the YWCA for 53 years.

At age 92, Campbell led 10,000 members of the Delta Sigma Theta sorority in a march down Pennsylvania Avenue in Washington, D.C., to commemorate the participation of some members of the organization in the suffrage march of 1913. Having long survived her husband and son, she spent her final years in a Seattle nursing home and died peacefully at age 100.

In 2018 and 2019, the Northwest African American Museum featured an exhibition on Campbell and Mona Humphries Bailey, the 17th president of Delta Sigma Theta.

== Sources ==
- Delta Memories: A Historical Summary by Robert Ewell Greene.
- Delta Sigma Theta: Its History and Development by Edna B. Johnson Morris, Grand Historian Delta Sigma Theta Sorority.
- In Search of Sisterhood: Delta Sigma Theta and the Challenge of the Black Sorority Movement by Paula Giddings.
- Shaped to Its Purpose: Delta Sigma Theta - The First Fifty Years by Mary Elizabeth Vroman.
- Hill, Pauline Anderson Simmons (1998). Too Young To Be Old: Bertha Pitts Campbell. AuthorHouse. ISBN 1434392554.
- Romero, Victoria Wheeler Raider (2013). Bertha Pitts Campbell: The Founder We Knew. Lulu Publishing Services. ISBN 978-1483401027.
