= Ian Campbell =

Ian or Iain Campbell may refer to:

== Music ==
- Ian Campbell (folk musician) (1933–2012), one of the leaders of the British folk revival of the 1960s
  - Ian Campbell Folk Group, the group led by Ian Campbell, which included Dave Pegg and Dave Swarbrick, later of Fairport Convention
- Ian Campbell (opera director) (born 1945), Australian-born opera singer, stage director and administrator
- Ian Campbell (rapper) (born 1965), English hip-house/eurodance rapper
- Ian Campbell, singer with Neuraxis
- Iain Campbell (died 2015), Scottish musician and member of the band Stealers Wheel

== Politicians ==
- Ian Campbell (Scottish politician) (1926–2007), Labour MP for Dunbartonshire West 1970–1987
- Ian Campbell (Australian politician) (born 1959), Australian politician
- Ian Campbell (Canadian politician) (born 1974 or 1975), Canadian politician
- Ian Campbell (public servant) (21st century), Australian public servant

== Sports ==
- Ian Campbell (rugby union) (1928–2022), Chilean rugby union footballer, of Scottish descent
- Iain Campbell (footballer) (born 1985), Scottish footballer
- Ian Campbell (triple jumper) (born 1957), Australian long and triple jumper
- Ian Campbell (sprinter) (born c. 1903), All-American sprinter for the Stanford Cardinal track and field team
- Iain Campbell (cricketer) (1928–2015), English cricketer and headmaster
- Ian Campbell (Middlesex cricketer) (1870–1954), English cricketer
- Ian Campbell (Queen's Park footballer) (fl. 1965–1977), Scottish football player (Queen's Park FC)
- Ian Campbell (footballer, born 1953), Scottish football player and manager (Brechin City FC)
- Ian Campbell (American football) (born 1985), Kansas State Wildcats college football player
- Iain Campbell (swimmer) (born 1965), British swimmer

== Others ==
- Ian Campbell (Royal Navy officer) (1898–1980), British admiral
- Ian Ross Campbell (1900–1997), Australian soldier and businessman
- Ian Campbell, 11th Duke of Argyll (1903–1973), Scottish peer
- Ian MacDonald Campbell (1922–1994), British civil engineer
- Ian James Campbell (1931–1963), murdered Los Angeles, California police officer
- Ian Campbell, 12th Duke of Argyll (1937–2001), Scottish Peer and Chief of Clan Campbell
- Iain Donald Campbell (1941–2014), Scottish biophysicist
- Ian Campbell (apothecary) (active circa 1992–2007), former officer of the British Medical Household
- Iain D. Campbell (1963–2017), minister in the Free Church of Scotland
- Ian L. Campbell (born 1945), British historian specialising in Ethiopia

== See also ==
- Iain Campbell Smith (active since 1997), Australian diplomat, singer/songwriter and comedian
