= Scott Campbell =

Scott Campbell may refer to:

- Scott Campbell (American football) (born 1962), former American football quarterback
- Scott Campbell (artist) (born 1973), production designer and illustrator
- Scott Campbell (tattoo artist) (born 1977), American artist
- Scott Campbell (author) (born 1945), American writer
- Scott Campbell (baseball) (born 1984), New Zealander retired minor league baseball player
- Scott Campbell (ice hockey, born 1957) (1957–2022), Canadian ice hockey defenceman in the WHA and NHL
- Scott Campbell (ice hockey, born 1972), Scottish ice hockey defenceman
- Scott Campbell (ice hockey, born 1986), Canadian professional ice hockey player
- Scott Campbell (musician) (born 1958), American composer and actor
- Scott Michael Campbell (born 1971), American actor, writer and producer
- J. Scott Campbell (born 1973), American comic book artist
- Scott Campbell (philosopher), American philosopher
- Scott Campbell (politician), member of the Vermont House of Representatives

== See also ==
- Scotty Campbell (born 1984), former Tennessee politician
