= Marsha Campbell =

American politician

Marsha Campbell (February 13, 1946 - October 11, 2026) was a former American Democratic politician who served in the Missouri House of Representatives.

Born in Princeton, New Jersey, she graduated from the University of Missouri with a bachelor's degree in business and public administration and the University of Missouri–Kansas City with a master's degree in political science. She has worked as a government relations consultant, as a manager of administration for Jackson County, Missouri, and as a buyer for Macy's and Hallmark Cards.

While serving in the legislature, Marsha served on the following committees: Education-Higher, Vice Chair; Appropriations-Social Services & Corrections, Member; Criminal Law, Member; Urban Affairs, Member; Ways & Means, Member; Joint Committee on Gaming and Wagering.
