= Philip Campbell =

Philip Campbell may refer to:

- Philip P. Campbell (1862–1941), American politician
- Philip Campbell (scientist) (born 1951), editor-in-chief of the scientific journal Nature
- Phillip Campbell, American tennis coach
- Phil Campbell (musician) (born 1961), Welsh musician

== See also ==
- Phil Campbell (disambiguation)
