= Nan Campbell =

American politician (1926–2013)

Nancy "Nan" Campbell (née Phelps; July 7, 1926 − November 19, 2013) was an American politician. She was the first woman to be elected mayor in the city of Bellevue, Washington.

Nan Campbell was born in Tacoma, Washington, on July 7, 1926, to Eva Janet (Cook) and Edgar Manley Phelps. Campbell grew up in Seattle where she graduated from Roosevelt High School in 1945 and the University of Washington in 1949. While in college, she was an active member of the Alpha Chi Omega sorority.

From 1982 to 1989, Campbell served two terms on the Bellevue City Council, supporting actions that benefited both the business community and residential neighborhoods. In 1988, her fellow council members elected her to become the city's first female Mayor. She retired from public office in 1990, but continued to be a champion for human services in Bellevue with organizations such as Bellevue YouthLink, United Way, and Youth Eastside Services (YES).

She died on November 19, 2013, at Overlake Hospital Medical Center in Bellevue, from injuries sustained as she escaped a fire in her apartment building two weeks earlier. She was 87 years old.
