= Patricia Grizzaffi Campbell =

American planetary scientist (1963–2000)

Patricia Grizzaffi Campbell (1963–March 9, 2000) was an American planetary scientist.

== Early life and education ==
Campbell was born in 1963. She received a Bachelor of Arts in geological sciences from Harvard University in 1985 and a Master of Science in planetary geology from Brown University in 1987. While working at NASA, she earned a Ph.D. in geophysics from The Johns Hopkins University in 1997, completing a dissertation on field and modeling studies of fluid dynamical processes in physical volcanology.

== Career ==
From 1988 to 1991, Campbell worked for RAND in Santa Monica, California. She contributed to planetary science programs involving geodetic control networks for Mars, Mercury, Triton, and Venus, as well as Magellan mission planning and data analysis. She also helped develop mission concepts and architectures for NASA's Space Exploration Initiative.

In 1991, while remaining a RAND staff scientist, Campbell relocated to Washington, D.C., to serve as a discipline scientist in the Solar System Exploration Division at NASA headquarters. At NASA, she formalized the agency's science review process and managed several major research and analysis initiatives, including the Venus Data Analysis Program, the Origins of Solar Systems Program, and the Planetary Geology and Geophysics Program.

She served as program scientist for the Mars Global Surveyor and the Mars 2001 Orbiter and Lander missions and oversaw technical and management activities at the Lunar and Planetary Institute in Houston, Texas.

Campbell left NASA in 1998 to become a Distinguished Visiting Scientist at the Smithsonian Institution. Her research focused on the geophysics of Venus and Mars, volcanism, geologic mapping, and lava flow emplacement dynamics. She was a member of the American Geophysical Union, the Geological Society of America, and the American Astronomical Society.
