= Daniel Campbell =

Daniel, Danny or Dan Campbell may refer to:

- Daniel Campbell (died 1753) (1671/2–1753), Scottish merchant and politician
- Daniel Campbell (Australian politician) (1812–1875), politician in Electoral district of Richmond, Australia
- Daniel Campbell (Canadian politician) (1926–1992), Canadian politician
- Daniel Campbell (constable), special constable of the Dominion Police who shot Albert "Ginger" Goodwin dead
- Daniel Campbell (Medal of Honor) (1874–1955), American Spanish–American War Medal of Honor recipient
- Dan Campbell (born 1976), American football coach and former player
- Dan Campbell (biathlete) (born 1978), American biathlete
- Dan Campbell (singer) (born 1986), lead vocalist for American punk band The Wonder Years
- Danny Campbell (footballer, born 1944) (1944–2020), English player (West Bromwich Albion, Stockport County), in 1966 Football League Cup Final
- Danny Campbell (rugby league) (1956–2021), New Zealand rugby league player with Wigan
