= J. Campbell (footballer) =

English footballer

Personal information
- Place of birth: England
- Position: Forward

Senior career*
Years	Team	Apps	(Gls)
1889–1890	Burnley	14	(3)
- * Club domestic league appearances and goals

J. Campbell was an English footballer who played in the Football League for Burnley.
