= Duncan Campbell =

Duncan Campbell may refer to:

== Military figures ==
- Sir Duncan Campbell, 2nd Baronet (1597–1645), commander of troops in Ireland
- Duncan Campbell (died 1758), Scottish nobleman and British Army officer
- Duncan Campbell (British Army officer, died 1837) (1763–1837), British Army general, MP for Ayr Burghs 1809–18
- Duncan Carter-Campbell of Possil (1911–1990), British Army colonel
- Sir Duncan Campbell, 3rd Baronet (1856–1926), Scottish British Army officer, historian and officer of arms

== Musicians ==
- Duncan Campbell (trumpeter) (1926–2013), Scottish musician
- Duncan Campbell (singer) (born 1958), lead singer of UB40

== Politicians ==
- Duncan Campbell, 1st Lord Campbell (died 1453/4), Scottish nobleman and politician
- Sir Duncan Campbell, 2nd Baronet (1597–1645), MP for Argyllshire 1628–43
- Duncan J. Campbell (1845–1882), physician and politician, Nova Scotia, Canada
- Duncan Campbell (Unionist politician) (1876–1916), MP for North Ayrshire 1911–16

== Journalists ==
- Duncan Campbell (journalist, born 1944) (1944–2025), British journalist and author, working particularly on crime issues
- Duncan Campbell (journalist, born 1952), investigative journalist and television producer, best known for his work on signals intelligence

== Others ==
- Sir Duncan Campbell of Glenorchy (1545–1631), Clan Campbell chieftain, landowner, courtier and favourite of Queen Anne of Denmark
- Duncan Campbell (soothsayer) (1680–1730), Scottish deaf-mute and professed soothsayer
- Duncan Campbell (revivalist) (1898–1972), Scottish preacher
- Duncan Campbell (snooker player) (born 1966), Scottish snooker player
- Duncan Campbell (artist) (born 1972), Irish artist
- Duncan Campbell (snowboarder) (born 1997), New Zealand snowboarder
- Duncan B. Campbell, British scholar
- Duncan Campbell (settler) (1781–1856), British settler to South Africa
- Duncan Campbell (inventor) (born 1955/56), Canadian co-inventor of murderball

== See also ==
- Duncan Campbell Ross (1871–1961), Canadian lawyer and Liberal politician
