= Luke Campbell (disambiguation) =

Luke Campbell (born 1987) is a British politician and former professional boxer.

Luke Campbell may also refer to:

- Luke Campbell (volleyball) (born 1979), Australian volleyball player
- Luke Campbell (rugby union, born 1992), Canadian rugby union player
- Luke Campbell (hurdler) (born 1994), German-American hurdler
- Luke Campbell (rugby union, born 1995), New Zealand rugby union player
- Luke Campbell, character in the American TV series Heroes

== See also ==
- Uncle Luke (Luther Campbell, born 1960), American rapper, member of 2 Live Crew
