= Patrick Campbell =

Patrick, Pat, or Paddy Campbell may refer to:

== Arts and entertainment ==
- Mrs Patrick Campbell (1865–1940), British stage actress
- Patrick Campbell, 3rd Baron Glenavy (1913–1980), Irish-born British journalist, humorist and television personality
- Pat Campbell (broadcaster) (1960–2021), American talk radio host
- Pat Campbell (cartoonist), Australian cartoonist

== Military ==
- Patrick Campbell (British Army officer, born 1684) (1684–1751), British Army General and Member of Parliament
- Patrick Campbell (Royal Navy officer) (1773–1841), British Royal Navy officer
- Patrick Campbell (British Army officer, born 1779) (1779–1857), British Army Major General, British agent and Consul General in Egypt
- Patrick Campbell (INLA member) (1977–1999), Irish National Liberation Army volunteer who was murdered by drug dealers

== Sports ==
- Paddy Campbell (born 1974), Irish Gaelic footballer
- Pat Campbell (lacrosse) (born 1977), Canadian lacrosse player
- Patrick Campbell (rugby union) (born 2002), Irish Gaelic footballer and rugby union player

== Others ==
- Patrick T. Campbell (1871–1937), American educator
- Patrick J. Campbell (1918–1998), American labor leader
- Patrick Campbell (academic) (born 1935), English academic and journalist

== See also ==
- Patrick Campbell Rodger (1920–2002), Anglican clergyman
- Patrick Campbell-Lyons (1943–2026), Irish musician and composer
