= Joseph Campbell (archdeacon) =

Australian clergyman and mineralogist (1856–1933)

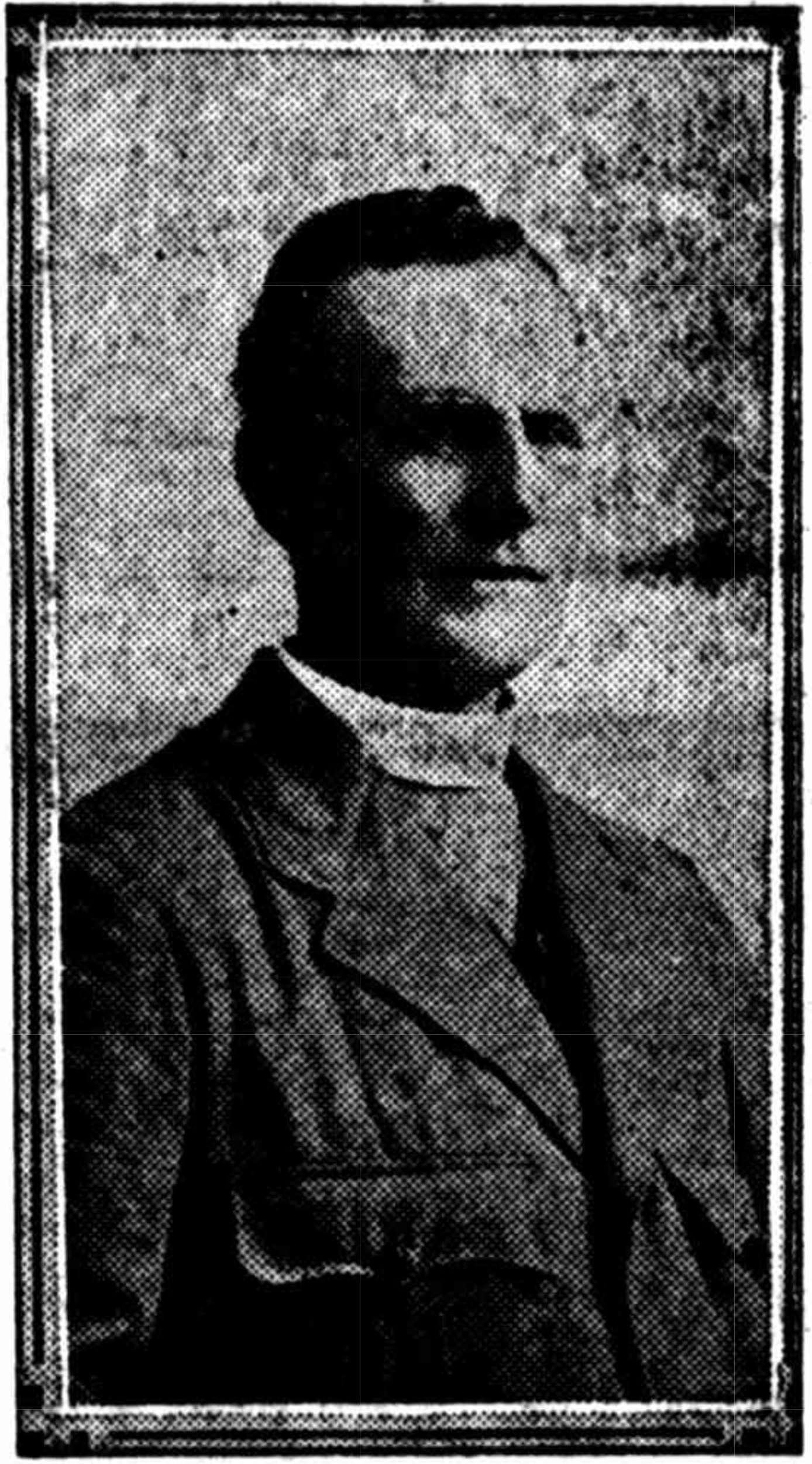
Archdeacon Joseph Campbell, 1923

Joseph Campbell (1856–1933) was an Anglican priest and mineralogist in Australia. Campbell was a recognised authority on geology and served as a consulting engineer in both Queensland and New South Wales. He was an expert on gemstones and wrote several books on the subject.

== Early life ==
Joseph Campbell was born on 13 September 1856 at St Marys, New South Wales, the son of storekeeper William Branch Campbell and his wife Elizabeth Anne (née Jackson).

== Religious life ==
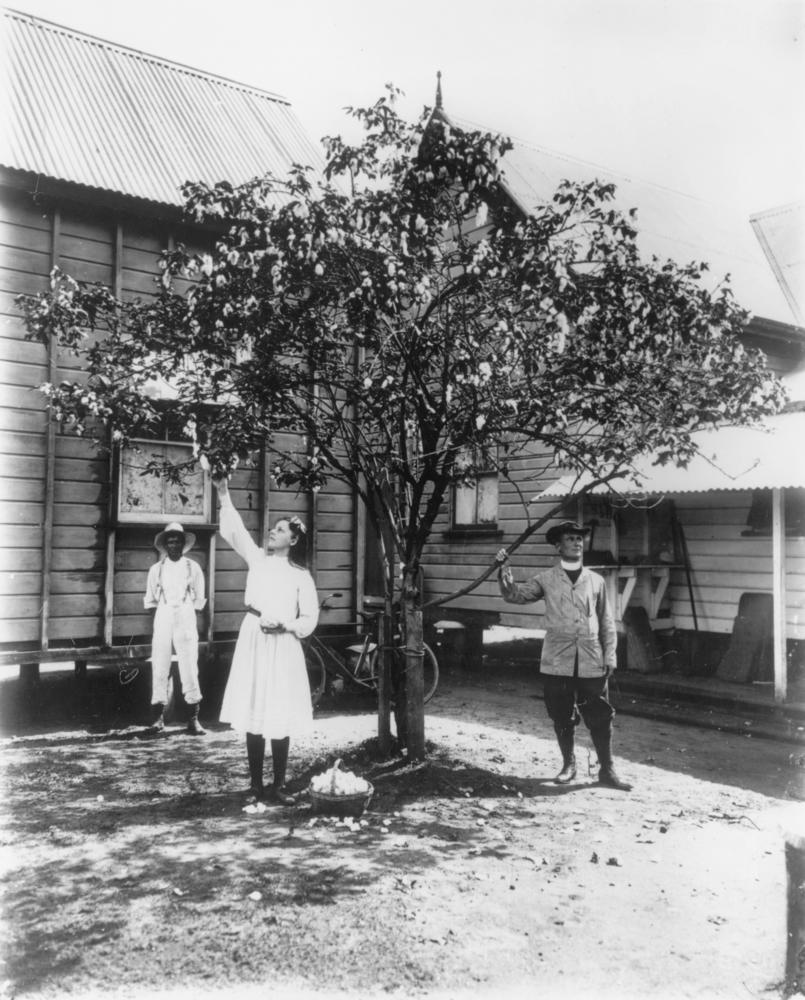
Archdeacon Joseph Campbell beside a cotton tree, Cairns, circa 1912

Campbell was a prominent figure in the Anglican Church. He was archdeacon in the Anglican Diocese of Northern Queensland for some years.

== Mineralogy ==
Campbell was a recognised authority on geology and served as a consulting engineer in both Queensland and New South Wales. He was an expert on gemstones and wrote several books on the subject.

== Personal life ==
Campbell was married with three children. His nephew Malcolm Campbell was a famous motor car racer, holding several world records.

== Later life ==
Campbell resigned from the Church in September 1909 much to the disappointment of Bishop George Frodsham who tried to persuade him to stay.

However, a few years before his death on 17 October 1933, he resumed ministerial work within the Diocese of Goulburn. Campbell was serving as the acting rector of St John's Church of England in Barmedman in New South Wales. He had suffered from bronchial trouble for about 18 months prior to this time and died peacefully in his sleep. His funeral service was held at St John's and he was buried in Barmedman Cemetery.

== Published works ==
- Campbell, Joseph (1905), The key of knowledge for miners, or What's the value of this ore? : being notes on practical chemistry and assaying

== Legacy ==
Campbell's cotton plantation known as "The Bungalow" provided the name for the suburb of Bungalow in Cairns, Queensland.
