= Frederick William Campbell (genealogist) =

Scottish genealogist

Frederick William Campbell (1782–1846) was a Scottish genealogist.

== Life ==
Campbell was a descendant of the Campbells of Barbreck, a branch of the Argyll family, and the eldest son of Donald Campbell of Barbreck. He was born on 4 January 1782; and entering the army became captain in the 1st regiment of guards. Some time after succeeding his father in 1804, he disposed of the estate in Argyllshire, retaining only the superiority to connect him with the county, and took up his residence at Birfield Lodge, near Ipswich, Suffolk. He was a magistrate and deputy-lieutenant of the county.

== Works ==
In 1830 he printed privately a work entitled 'A Letter to Mrs. Campbell of Barbreck, containing an Account of the Campbells of Barbreck from their First Ancestors to the Present Time,’ Ipswich.

== Family ==
He married, on 21 February 1820, Sophia, daughter of Sir Edward Warrington, M.P., by whom he had one daughter.
