= Blind James Campbell =

American singer

- Born: James Campbell; September 17, 1906; Nashville, Tennessee, U.S.
- Died: January 22, 1981 (aged 74) Nashville, Tennessee, U.S.
- Genre: Blues
- Occupations: Musician; singer; songwriter
- Instrument: Guitar
- Label: Arhoolie Records

Blind James Campbell (September 17, 1906 – January 22, 1981) was an American blues singer and guitarist. He is mostly remembered for his 1962–63 recording for the Arhoolie label with his Nashville Street Band.

== Biography ==
James Campbell was born in Nashville, Tennessee, on September 17, 1906. He later became known as Blind James Campbell after an accident at a fertilizer plant left him permanently blinded. In 1936, he formed a band and began playing folk, country, pop, jazz and blues music at parties, dances and for other local events. The Nashville Street Band consisted of fiddler Beauford Clay (born 1900) who was a great influence on Campbell's playing, second guitarist Bell Ray (born 1909), bass horn player Ralph Robinson (born 1885), and trumpeter George Bell.

Campbell and his band appeared to be quite content with the steady work they were receiving, and did not seem to have any desire to pursue a career in recording. However, Chris Strachwitz of Arhoolie Records became interested in the band after hearing a field recording of them made by a fellow blues fan, Donald Hill. Hill had recorded Campbell in the spring of 1959 and again in April 1961. Hill's recordings include Campbell singing country songs as well as blues. He also recorded Campbell and his string band on a street corner in downtown Nashville and recorded him with Beauford Clay. Both the original tapes and digital copies of Hill's recordings have been deposited at Library of Congress as a part of the Hill/Mangurian collection of field recordings made between 1958 and 1961.

After listening to Hill's tapes, Strachwitz set off to Nashville to find and record Campbell and his band. After two recording sessions with Campbell and his band in 1962 and 1963, the Arhoolie LP Blind James Campbell And His Nashville Street Band (Arhoolie 1015) was released in 1963.

While these recordings never propelled Campbell into prominence, and the history of James Campbell and his band since the 1963 recordings is hazy, Strachwitz revisited these recordings and released them on CD in 1995, along with additional tracks from both recording sessions. Certainly, these recordings show evidence of a street band of considerable skill and quality, who were able to play American music from a variety of genres.

James Campbell died in Nashville, Tennessee, on January 22, 1981.

== Studio album ==
- Blind James Campbell And His Nashville Street Band (Arhoolie, 1963)
- Strachwitz, Chris. (1995). Blind James Campbell and His Nashville Street Band. Audio CD (Liner notes). Arhoolie CD 438.
