= Chris Campbell (composer) =

Christopher Campbell (born August 17, 1979) is an American composer and record producer known for his work in contemporary classical and experimental music. He is known for his recorded works and for his leadership role at Innova Recordings, the label of the American Composers Forum.

== Education ==
Campbell studied composition at Sarah Lawrence College, where his teachers included George Tsontakis, Chet Biscardi, and David Del Tredici.

== Composition work ==
Campbell has released multiple recordings of original compositions through Innova Recordings. His music has been reviewed and discussed in contemporary music publications including New Music USA, Textura, Seattle Post-Intelligencer, and ATTN: Magazine. His work focuses on sustained textures, timbral detail, and gradual formal development, with influences in post-minimalist and ambient-influenced contemporary composition.

His recordings are listed in national distribution catalogs including Naxos and AllMusic.

== Innova Recordings ==
Campbell served from 2003 to 2020 in senior production and administrative roles at Innova Recordings, the nationally recognized contemporary classical label of the American Composers Forum. Under his leadership, the label developed an open submission model for composers, and its catalog grew from 70 to over 700 titles.
