= Fiona Campbell =

Fiona Campbell or Fionna Campbell may refer to:

== People ==
- Fiona Campbell (cricketer) (born 1981), Scottish cricketer
- Fiona Campbell (alpine skier) (1929–2005), British alpine skier
- Fiona Campbell (mezzo-soprano), Australian opera singer
- Fiona Kumari Campbell (born 1963), Australian disability studies researcher and theorist
- Fiona Campbell-Walter (born 1932), British model

== Other uses ==
- Fionna Campbell, fictional character in the Adventure Time franchise
- "Fionna Campbell", television episode of the animated series Adventure Time: Fionna and Cake
