= Julia Campbell (disambiguation) =

Julia Campbell may refer to:

- Julia Campbell (born 1963), American actress
- Julia Campbell (journalist) (1967–2007), American journalist
- Julia Campbell (footballer) (born 1965), New Zealand women's international football player

== See also ==
- Julie Campbell (disambiguation)
- Juliet Campbell (disambiguation)
