= Gordon Campbell =

Gordon Campbell may refer to:

- Gordon Campbell (cricketer) (1885–1961), Australian cricketer
- Gordon Campbell (Royal Navy officer) (1886–1953), British admiral, recipient of the Victoria Cross and British politician
- Gordon Peter Campbell (1898–1964), Canadian senator, lawyer and businessman
- Gordon Campbell (curler) (1906–1995), Canadian curler
- Gordon Campbell (rugby league) (1906–?), New Zealand rugby league player
- Gordon Campbell, Baron Campbell of Croy (1921–2005), British politician
- Gordon Campbell (scholar) (born 1944), British Renaissance scholar
- Gordon Campbell (Canadian politician) (born 1948), former premier of British Columbia and former Canadian high commissioner to the United Kingdom
- Gordon Campbell (businessman), former chief executive and chairman of Babcock International
- Gordon Campbell, New Zealand journalist and editor of the website Scoop
- Gordon A. Campbell, co-founder of Chips and Technologies
- Gordon Campbell, trombonist with the BBC Big Band
