= Jeff Campbell =

Jeff Campbell may refer to:

- Jeff Campbell (American football) (born 1968), American football player who played wide receiver for the Detroit Lions and Denver Broncos
- Jeff Campbell (businessman) (fl. 2000s), American restaurant business executive
- Jeff Campbell (ice hockey) (born 1981), Canadian ice hockey player
- Jeff Campbell (footballer) (born 1979), New Zealand soccer player
- Jeffrey Campbell (water polo) (born 1962), American water polo player
- Jeff Campbell (Family Guy), a fictional character
- Jeff Campbell (Virginia politician) (born 1966), former member of the Virginia House of Delegates
- Jeff Campbell (West Virginia politician) (born 1969), member of the West Virginia House of Delegates
- Jeff Campbell (musician), American musician and singer-songwriter
- Jeffrey Campbell, American shoe company

== See also ==
- Geoffrey Campbell (disambiguation)
