= Bessie Campbell =

Anglican Australian-born banjoist (1870–1964)

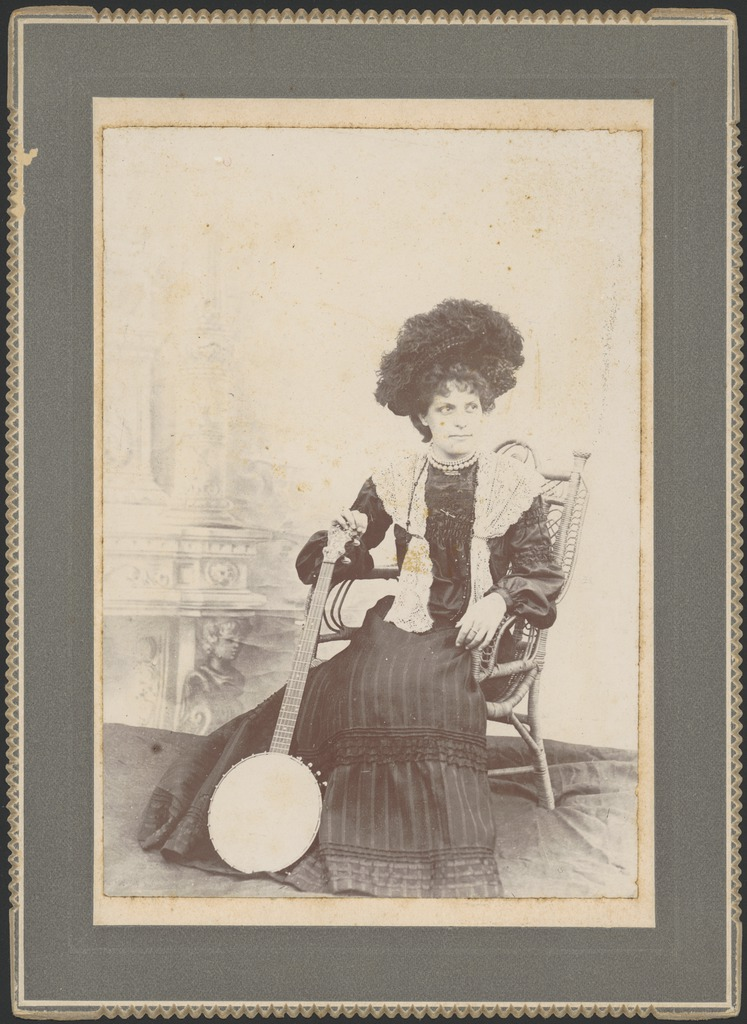

Background information
- Born: Elizabeth Campbell; 21 July 1870; Melbourne, Victoria, Australia
- Died: 28 April 1964 (aged 93) Burwood, New South Wales, Australia
- Instrument: banjo

Elizabeth Campbell (1870–1964), whose heritage is Irish, was an Anglican Australian-born banjo player as well as a charity worker.

== Early life ==
Elizabeth Campbell, known as "Bessie", was born on 21 July 1870 in Melbourne, Australia. She is from an Irish and Anglican background and is the daughter of Christopher Campbell, a former employee for Madam Tussaud in Dublin, and Eliza née McMullen who was his second wife. Christopher and his wife migrated to Melbourne in 1849. In the early 1870s their family moved to Sydney as he continued his work in the waxworks industry.

== Education ==
When Bessie was 14 years old, she went to London with her parents. Whilst there she was taught the banjo by Joe Daniels and documented that, "she took a great fancy to the five stringed banjo". The year after the family returned to Sydney where she remained learning the banjo for three more months from the American Hosea Easton.

She also took lessons from Walter Stent, whose book "Progressive Studies for the Banjo" teaches classic-banjo fingerstyle.

== Career ==
Bessie Campbell started to come out and play her banjo in charity concerts from 1891. In about September 1893 she played a solo at the American Banjo Club's concert at the Centenary Hall, York Street, in assistance of the Seamen's Mission.Bessie began to appear in concerts for charity not money. Her success was so big that by 1897 she was titled "Australia's greatest lady banjoist". Bessie had become the first female member to join the "American Banjo Club", which was founded by Stent in 1892. On average, she received six to eight letters a week wanting her to perform at concerts great and small. In April 1904 she was compensated five guineas for performing at the Bathurst Agricultural Show. Bessie was titled as "The Banjo Queen" in 1907, and toured the northern rivers with the National Concert Company. Her songs consisted of Christy-minstrel songs and Negro spirituals in her collection and was regularly accompanied by her sister on the piano.

== Charity work ==
At one of her charity shows, one critic found her "a wonder for she plays the banjo with so much ability as to render it almost a classical instrument". During World War I, at the crest of her career, she gave numerous performances for servicemen and the Australian Red Cross Society. After the war had ended, Bessie performed at many charity shows for the Western Suburbs Leagues Club and the Returned Sailors' and Soldiers' Imperial League. In the 1920s she was the honorary secretary of the Wanderers Club, and was involved in charitable work for them and Burwood Municipal Council.

== Personal life ==
Bessie was diagnosed with arthritis in the early 1930s, and this was making it challenging for her to play and she had never made commercial recordings ever since. Bessie was a great fan of cricket. Bessie Campbell was considered as a beautiful woman and consistently had suitors.

== Death ==
Bessie died an unmarried woman on 28 April 1964 at Burwood, New South Wales and was buried in the Anglican section of Rookwood cemetery.
