= Grace Campbell Stewart =

Scottish miniature painter

Grace Campbell Stewart (died 1863) was a British miniature painter.

== Biography ==
Stewart was one of the daughters of Anthony Stewart, 1773–1846, a portrait and miniature painter from Crieff in Perthshire and of Janet Weir whose father, Alexander Weir, was also a painter. Their father taught both Grace and her elder sister, Margaret Seguier, to paint. After moving to London, where she lived in Clapham for a long period, Grace Stewart built a reputation as a fine miniature painter. Between 1843 and 1856 she exhibited 14 works at the Royal Academy in London. These were mostly portrait miniatures of members of the Scottish nobility including the children of John Scott, 2nd Earl of Eldon and his wife Louisa.
