= Kathleen Campbell =

Kathleen Campbell may refer to:

- Kathleen Foster Campbell (1897–1991), Irish-born American poet
- Kathleen Campbell (geologist), American-born New Zealand geology and astrobiology academic

== See also ==
- Kathleen Campbell-Brown (1903–1996), lecturer in French at the University of Queensland
