= Tim Campbell (activist) =

American LGBTQ activist

- Born: December 18, 1939.
- Died: December 26, 2015 (aged 76)

Tim Campbell (1939–2015) was a gay activist and newspaper publisher in Minneapolis, Minnesota.

== Biography ==
Campbell was born in Leavenworth, Kansas and grew up on the Gulf Coast of Texas. He had four brothers and two sisters. He attended St. Mary's Seminary in Houston, and quit the seminary after being sent to a psychiatrist who recommended that he date women.

In his self-written obituary, Campbell said that in 1962 when he was called to register for the draft, he checked the box for "homosexual tendencies," causing him to list '1Y' as his draft status.

Campbell earned his master's degree in French linguistics from the University of Texas in 1969 and moved to teach at the University of Minnesota-Morris in 1970. He was fired for excessive drinking, and was sober from 1973 onward, at which time he moved to Minneapolis.

He eventually returned to Texas to be near his family. He advocated for improvements at the public housing facility where he lived. He died in 2015 at the age of 76 of esophageal cancer.

== LGBTQ activism ==
Campbell was an outspoken gay activist in the Twin Cities, as he regularly responded to reporters on diverse gay issues. He regularly came into conflict with former Minneapolis City Council Member Barbara Carlson. He once swung a briefcase at a Minneapolis police officer.

Campbell was well known in Minnesota as a self-appointed spokesman for the gay community and often employed confrontational and spectacle tactics in his activism. For example, he once dressed as Lady Liberty to protest the Rev. Jerry Falwell and set fire in the Minneapolis Civil Rights Department to protest the handling of gay issues. He came into conflict with the first openly gay legislator in Minnesota, state Senator Allan Spear. With other ACT UP activists, he crashed the Minneapolis Aquatennial parade in the early 1990s.

In the late 1970s, he reported for a short-lived newspaper, Positively Gay and went on to found GLC Voice, a newspaper from the Twin Cities gay and lesbian community which ran from 1979 to 1992. GLC Voice was distributed freely on college campuses, in gay bars, bookstores, and on the streets. Campbell advocated for safe sex, gay marriage, and regularly covered the HIV/AIDS crisis, supporting condom usage.

In 1973 and 1974, Campbell worked with Jack Baker and Mike McConnell to run sensitivity training on gay issues in a variety of contexts. In 1974, Campbell was the press spokesperson for FREE, a University of Minnesota gay and lesbian group, during an equal-employment rally, which led to his connection to the local press. He advocated for using "gay" and "lesbian" instead of "homosexual" to both national and local publications.

Along with Jerome K. Smith, Campbell founded the Lambda Sobriety Center in Minneapolis in 1981.
