= Bob Campbell (Australian footballer) =

Australian rules footballer (1868–1946)

Personal information
- Full name: Robert Alexander Campbell
- Born: 6 September 1868; Kyneton, Victoria
- Died: 1 June 1946 (aged 77); Brighton, Victoria
- Original team: Brighton Beach

Playing career^{1}
Years	Club	Games (Goals)
1900	St Kilda	1 (0)
- ^{1} Playing statistics correct to the end of 1900.

Bob Campbell (6 September 1868 – 1 June 1946) was an Australian rules footballer who played with St Kilda in the Victorian Football League (VFL).
