= Geoffrey Campbell Gunter =

Jamaican politician

Sir Geoffrey Campbell Gunter CBE

Acting Governor of Jamaica
- In office 14 June 1960 – 13 October 1960
- Preceded by: Kenneth Blackburne
- Succeeded by: Kenneth Blackburne

Personal details
- Born: 30 April 1879 Kingston, Jamaica
- Died: 17 September 1961 (aged 82) Kingston, Jamaica

Sir Geoffrey Campbell Gunter CBE (30 April 1879 – 17 September 1961) was the first Jamaican to have been governor of Jamaica in the modern era. Gunter was chief accountant of the Jamaica Government Railway, mayor of Kingston and founder and president of the Jamaica Philatelic Society.

== Early life ==
Gunter was born on 30 April 1879 in Kingston, Jamaica. He was educated in the Kingston Collegiate School.

== Career ==
Gurner joined the civil service in 1896. During World War I, he served as a lieutenant in the Jamaica Reserve Regiment from 1914 to 1918. From 1923 to 1940, he was chief accountant of the Jamaica Government Railway. From 1943 to 1947, he was alderman of Kingston and St. Andrew Corporation. Having been deputy mayor from 1944 to 1946, Gunter served as mayor of Kingston from 1946 to 1947. He then spent a year as a Trade Controller and Competent Authority. On 14 June 1960, while Sir Kenneth Blackburne was away on leave, Gunter became acting governor of Jamaica. He was the first Jamaican to have held the office of governor. Blackburne resumed his duties as governor on 13 October 1960. Gunter also founded the Jamaica Philatelic Society and was its first president.

== Personal life and death ==
Gunter married Florence Miller. His son Geoffrey Arthur Gunter became a trade relations manager at Royal Dutch Shell. On 17 September 1961, while attending a commemoration of the Battle of Britain at the Kingston Parish Church, Geoffrey Campbell Gunter suffered a heart attack and died at the age of 82.

== Recognition ==
Gunter was appointed as Officer of the Most Excellent Order of the British Empire (OBE) in 1951 and as Commander of the Most Excellent Order of the British Empire (CBE) in 1954. In 1961, he was conferred knighthood by Queen Elizabeth II.
