= Paul Campbell (cricketer) =

New Zealand cricketer (born 1968)

Personal information
- Full name: Paul Adrian Campbell
- Born: 11 February 1968 (age 58); Dunedin, New Zealand
- Batting: Right-handed
- Bowling: Left-arm medium
- Role: Wicket-keeper
- Relatives: Keith Campbell (father)

Domestic team information
- Years: Team
- 1989/90–1996/97: Otago
- Source: ESPNcricinfo, 6 May 2016

Paul Adrian Campbell (born 11 February 1968) is a New Zealand former cricketer. He played three first-class matches for Otago between the 1989–90 and 1994–95 seasons and seven List A matches for the side during the 1996–97 season.

Campbell was born at Dunedin in 1968 and was educated at King's High School in the city. His father, Keith Campbell played cricket for Otago and New Zealand. After playing for Otago's Second XI in 1988–89, Paul Campbell made his first-class debut for the side the following season, scoring 37 runs in his first innings on debut against Canterbury at Carisbrook. He played in Otago's next match against Central Districts before dropping out of the side.

After returning to play a final first-class match in March 1995―as the side's wicket-keeper for the first time―Campbell played in seven List A matches the following season, keeping wickets in seven of Otago's 10 Shell Cup matches during the season. He scored a total of 89 runs in his three first-class matches and took one wicket. His only senior half-century came in List A cricket, a score of 51 not out made against Central Districts in his final senior appearance.
