= Graeme Campbell =

Graeme or Graham Campbell may refer to:

- Graham Campbell (footballer) (1936–2022), Australian rules footballer
- Graeme Campbell (politician) (1939–2025), Australian politician
- Graeme Campbell (director) (born 1954), Canadian film director
- Graham Campbell (actor) (born 2001), American actor
- Graham Campbell, contestant in American reality TV series The Final Table

== See also ==
- James Graham-Campbell (born 1947), British archaeologist
- Campbell Graham, (born 1999), Australian rugby league player
