= Bill Campbell (footballer, born 1883) =

Australian rules footballer (1883–1954)

Personal information
- Full name: William Henry Campbell
- Born: 26 July 1883; Warrandyte South, Victoria
- Died: 9 July 1954 (aged 70); Melbourne, Victoria
- Original team: Preston District
- Height: 175 cm (5 ft 9 in)
- Weight: 74 kg (163 lb)

Playing career^{1}
Years	Club	Games (Goals)
1908	Fitzroy	1 (0)
- ^{1} Playing statistics correct to the end of 1908.

William Henry Campbell (26 July 1883 – 9 July 1954) was an Australian rules footballer who played for the Fitzroy Football Club in the Victorian Football League (VFL).
