= Charlotte C. Campbell =

US medical mycologist

- Born: December 4, 1914; Winchester, Virginia
- Died: October 8, 1993 (aged 78); Boston, Massachusetts
- Known for: Researching the epidemiology and treatment of histoplasmosis
- Scientific career
- Fields: Medical mycology
- Workplaces: Walter Reed Army Institute of Research; Harvard University's School of Public Health

Charlotte Catherine Campbell (December 4, 1914 – October 8, 1993) was an American medical mycologist.

== Biography ==
Campbell was born on a farm near Winchester, Virginia, on December 4, 1914.

Campbell trained at Ohio State University, American University, George Washington University and Duke University.

Campbell reported in 1945 that growth of the yeast form of Sporothrix schenckii was "luxuriantly supported" by a glucose-cystine blood agar growth medium. She also found that the medium supported growth of the yeast phase of Histoplasma capsulatum with some modification.

In 1948 Campbell was made Walter Reed Army Institute of Research's medical mycology chief. At Walter Reed she performed serological tests diagnosing cases of Histoplasmosis capsulati, blastomycosis, and coccidioidomycosis with Samuel Saslaw and G. Hill.

Campbell became an associate professor of medical mycology at Harvard University's School of Public Health in 1962. She was elected President of the Medical Mycological Society of the Americas in 1969. She was advanced to full professor at Harvard in 1970. She became professor of medical sciences at Southern Illinois University in 1973. She was a department chair from 1974 until 1977, when she retired. Campbell co-authored or wrote over 100 treatises, with a particular focus on the epidemiology and treatment of histoplasmosis. In 1975, Campbell

The International Society for Human and Animal Mycology conferred its highest award to Campbell in 1979.

Following her academic retirement, Campbell spent three years working for the American Society for Microbiology on student exchanges to the Soviet Union. She also volunteered with battered women and at Brigham and Women's Hospital. She died on October 8, 1993, in Boston after a brief illness.

== Selected publications ==
- Saslaw, Samuel; Campbell, Charlotte C. (1949). "A Comparison between Histoplasmin and Blastomycin by the Collodion Agglutination Technique". Public Health Reports. 64 (9): 290–294. doi:10.2307/4586872. JSTOR 4586872. PMID 18111632.
- Saslaw, Samuel; Campbell, Charlotte C. (1949). "A Collodion Agglutination Test for Histoplasmosis". Public Health Reports. 64 (13): 424–429. doi:10.2307/4586906. JSTOR 4586906. PMID 18124818.
- Campbell, Charlotte C.; Saslaw, Samuel (January 1951). "Failure of Streptomycin to Enhance the Infectivity of Histoplasma capsulatum in Mice". Public Health Reports. 66 (1): 16–19. PMC 2030532. PMID 14786349.
