= Mary Campbell =

Mary Campbell may refer to:

- Mary Baine Campbell, American poet, scholar, and professor
- Mary Campbell (colonial settler) (1747/1748–1801), American colonial settler
- Mary Campbell, Countess of Argyll (1628–1668)
- Mary Campbell, Countess of Breadalbane and Holland (1636–1717), English noblewoman
- Mary Campbell (figure skater), American retired figure skater
- Mary Campbell (Highland Mary) (1763–1786), Scottish nursemaid and dairymaid romantically linked with Robert Burns
- Mary Dranga Campbell (1867–1957), American activist for the blind
- Mary Edith Campbell (1875/1876–1962), American suffragist and social economist
- Mary Greig Campbell (1907–1989), New Zealand librarian and Quaker
- Mary Katherine Campbell (1905–1990), two-time winner of the Miss America pageant
- Mary Maxwell Campbell (1812–1886), Scottish songwriter, composer, and poet
- Mary Schmidt Campbell (born 1947), dean at New York University
- Mary Winchester (Supernatural), née Mary Campbell, a character in the TV series Supernatural
- Mary Campbell of Mamore (c. 1685–1736), Scottish aristocrat

== See also ==
- Mary Campbell Cave, Ohio, US
