= Phil Campbell =

Phil Campbell may refer to:

== People ==
- Phil Campbell (politician) (1917–1998), American farmer and politician
- Phil Campbell (musician) (1961–2026), British guitarist, member of Motörhead
- Phil Campbell (writer) (born 1972), American author and documentary producer
- Phil Campbell, Scottish musician and member of the band The Temperance Movement
- Phil Campbell, a pseudonym of the writer Phyllis Campbell

== Places ==
- Phil Campbell, Alabama, a town in the United States

== See also ==
- Philip Campbell (disambiguation)
