= Edward Campbell =

Edward Campbell may refer to:

== People ==
- Edward Campbell (journalist) (1916–2006), British journalist and authority on circuses
- Sir Edward Campbell, 1st Baronet (1879–1945), British Conservative Party politician
- Sir Edward Campbell, 2nd Baronet (1822–1882), British peer and soldier
- Edward Campbell (rugby league) (1943–2015), rugby league footballer of the 1960s and 1970s
- Edward C. Campbell (1806–1860), judge and politician in Canada West
- Edward Fitzhardinge Campbell (1880–1957), Irish rugby international
- Edward Hale Campbell (1872–1946), Judge Advocate General of the U.S. Navy
- Edward Kernan Campbell (1858–1938), American judge
- Edward L. Campbell (1833–1913), American Civil War general

== Fictional character ==
- Edward Campbell (Holby City), fictional character from the medical drama Holby City

== See also ==
- Ed H. Campbell (1882–1969), U.S. Representative from Iowa
- Eddie Campbell (born 1955), Scottish comics artist and cartoonist
- Eddy Campbell, Canadian mathematician, university professor, and university administrator
- Eddie C. Campbell (1939–2018), American blues guitarist and singer
