= Felicity Campbell =

Felicity Campbell may refer to:

- Felicity Campbell (speed skater) (born 1974)
- Felicity Campbell (artist)
