= Rosemary Campbell =

New Zealand artist and teacher

- Born: 1941 (age 84–85); Timaru, New Zealand
- Education: Ilam School of Fine Arts, École des Beaux-Arts
- Known for: Painting, lithography, etching
- Website: http://www.rosemarycampbell.co.nz

Rosemary Campbell (born 1941) is a New Zealand artist and teacher.

== Background ==
Campbell was born in Timaru, New Zealand, in 1941.

Campbell attended the Ilam School of Fine Arts at the University of Canterbury. In 1974 she received a Queen Elizabeth II Arts Council Scholarship to study at the École des Beaux-Arts where she focused on lithography and etching.

== Career ==
Landscape and music are the major themes in Campbell's work although she does a considerable number of commissioned portraits. Campbell works predominantly in watercolour, and in oils for her portraiture.

After completing her Fine Arts degree, Campbell returned to South Canterbury and has taught at the Timaru Girls' High School, Craighead Diocesan School, and Aoraki Polytechnic.

Works by Campbell are held at the Christchurch Art Gallery Te Puna o Waiwhetu.

Exhibitions

Campbell has exhibited with the New Zealand Academy of Fine Arts and The Group in 1967, 1975, and 1976. In addition, her exhibitions have included:

- 1964, 1967, 1969: South Canterbury Society of Arts
- 1966: Adult Education Rooms, Timaru
- 1967: Museum Foyer, Dunedin
- 1968, 1972: Dawson's Gallery, Dunedin
- 1968: Several Arts, Christchurch
- 1969, 1970, 1973, 1978, 1983, 1984: New Vision Gallery, Auckland
- 1970, 1979, 1981: Decor Gallery, Timaru
- 1971: Dreams Half Recalled, Canterbury Society of Arts
- 1972, 1981: Elva Betty Gallery, Wellington
- 1972: Bosshard Gallery, Akaroa
- 1973, 1983, 1989: Aiganthighe Art Gallery, Timaru
- 1975, 1976, 1981, 1987, 1989: Canterbury Society of Arts
- 1977, 1978, 1980: Brooke Gifford Gallery, Christchurch
- 1979: Suter Gallery, Nelson
- 1979: BrookeGifford Gallery, Christchurch (with Dorothy Buchanan and the Canterbury Society of Arts members for Interpretations)
- 1979: Forrester Gallery, Oamaru
- 1980: New Vision, Auckland (with Dorothy Buchanan and members of the Auckland Symphonia)
- 1981: Louise Beale Gallery, Wellington
- 1981: Bosshard Gallery, Dunedin
- 1982: Graham Gallery, Wollongong, Australia
- 1982: Musical Evocations, Gaugh Gallery, Melbourne
- 1983, 1985: Louise Beale Gallery, Wellington
