= Bland Hayden Campbell =

American politician

Member of the Mississippi State Senate from the 1st district
- In office January 1956 – January 1972

Member of the Mississippi House of Representatives from the Hinds County district
- In office January 1948 – January 1952

Personal details
- Born: February 7, 1905 Middlesboro, Kentucky, U.S.
- Died: August 30, 1989 (aged 84) Jackson, Mississippi, U.S.
- Party: Democratic

Bland Hayden Campbell (February 7, 1905 – August 30, 1989) was a state legislator in the U.S. state of Mississippi. He served in the Mississippi House of Representatives from 1948 to 1952 and then in the Mississippi State Senate from 1956 to 1972.

He was born in Middlesboro, Kentucky, and moved to Jackson, Mississippi, in 1930. Campbell represented Hinds County as a Democrat in the Mississippi House of Representatives from 1948 to 1952. He represented the 1st District in the Mississippi State Senate from 1956 to 1972. During his tenure in the legislature, Campbell played a key role in the establishment of the University of Mississippi School of Medicine.

He opposed desegregation, stating it opened the doors to "murder and rape". He was a member of the Mississippi Sovereignty Commission and the Jackson Citizens Council. He resigned from the Sovereignty Commission in 1966 protesting its inactivity.

Campbell died on August 30, 1989, in the Lakeland Health Care Center in Jackson, Mississippi.

He had a son Bland Hayden Campbell Jr. and a grandson Bland Hayden Campbell III.
