= Gregory Campbell =

Gregory Campbell or Greg Campbell may refer to:

- Gregory Campbell (politician) (born 1953), Northern Ireland politician
- Gregory Campbell (ice hockey) (born 1983), Canadian ice hockey player
- Greg Campbell (cricketer) (born 1964), Australian cricketer
- Greg Campbell (author) (born 1970), American non-fiction author
- Greg Campbell (footballer) (born 1965), English former footballer
