= Christine Campbell (singer) =

British soprano singer

- Born: 1938 (age 86–87)
- Genres: Folk
- Occupation: Musician
- Instrument: Singer
- Years active: 1962–1967
- Labels: Parlophone

Christine Campbell (born 1938) is a British soprano singer who made several recordings of popular and folk songs for Parlophone in the early 1960s. Campbell's songs were mainly written by regular Parlophone writers such as Chris Charles & Tolchard Evans, and published as sheet music by Dick James.

== Recordings ==
- "Wherever I Go" written by Tolchard Evans and Chris Charles, B-side "Near Your Heart" Tolchard Evans and Bob Halfin. February 1962
- "He Is Here" Evans & Charles; B-side "My Home" written by Ralph Ruvin, Vincent Landbrooke and Dick James. September 1962
- "If This Should Be A Dream" written by Dick James and George Martin, B-side "One Life" Stillman & Myer January 1963
- "My Love" written by Martin and Marcel Stellman, B-side "The Loving Tree" Sprague. April 1963
- "You" Evans, Charles, B-side "Don't You Know" Chadwick & Ruvin April 1964
- "Auld Lang Syne" traditional, B-side "All Through The Night" Cole Porter, December 1966
- "Nos Da" written by Squires & Dunstall, B-side "Sleep Little Boy" April 1967
