= Kevin Campbell =

Kevin Campbell may refer to:

- Kevin Campbell (baseball) (born 1964), American baseball player
- Kevin Campbell (footballer) (1970–2024), English football player
- Kevin Campbell (hurler), Irish player of hurling
- Kevin Campbell (New Zealand politician) (born 1949), New Zealand politician
- Kevin Campbell (Wyoming politician)
- Kevin Campbell (scientist), American scientist
- Kevin T. Campbell, U.S. Army general
- Kevin Campbell (bowls) (born 1950), South African lawn bowler
- Kevin Campbell (racing driver), American stock car racing driver
