= Carol Campbell =

Carol Campbell may refer to:

- Carol Campbell (actress) (born 1966), Afro-German actress, model and presenter
- Carol Campbell (politician) (1940–2008), female Democratic politician in Philadelphia
- Carroll A. Campbell Jr. (1940–2005), male Republican politician in South Carolina
