= Andrew Campbell (cricketer) =

English cricketer and barrister

Personal information
- Full name: Andrew Neville Campbell
- Born: 17 June 1949 (age 77); Chesham Bois, Buckinghamshire, England
- Batting: Left-handed

Domestic team information
- Years: Team
- 1970–1972: Buckinghamshire
- 1968–1970: Oxford University

Career statistics
Competition	First-class
Matches	15
Runs scored	530
Batting average	20.38
100s/50s	–/4
Top score	73
Balls bowled	–
Wickets	–
Bowling average	–
5 wickets in innings	–
10 wickets in match	–
Best bowling	–
Catches/stumpings	5/–
- Source: Cricinfo, 15 May 2011

Andrew Neville Campbell KC (born 17 June 1949) is a former English cricketer who is currently a barrister. Campbell was a left-handed batsman. He was born in Chesham Bois, Buckinghamshire. He studied at New College, Oxford, emerging with an honours degree in jurisprudence.

Campbell made his first-class debut for Oxford University against Sussex in 1968. He played a further 14 first-class matches, the last coming against Cambridge University in 1970. He scored 530 runs in these matches, at a batting average of 20.38, with 4 half centuries and a high score of 73. This came against Surrey in 1970.

Campbell played Minor counties cricket for Buckinghamshire, who he debuted for in the 1970 Minor Counties Championship against Bedfordshire. He played Minor counties cricket for Buckinghamshire from 1970 to 1972, making 14 appearances. Following the end of his cricket career, Campbell became a barrister. He was called to the bar in 1972, and appointed as a Queen's Counsel in 1994. He is currently practising on the North Eastern Circuit, and is a recorder at Zenith Chambers in Leeds, Yorkshire.
