= Arthur Campbell =

Arthur Campbell may refer to:

== People ==
- Arthur Campbell (Clan Arthur), Scotsman rewarded for his support of Robert the Bruce
- Arthur Campbell (Virginia soldier) (1743–1811), member of the Virginia House of Burgesses, for whom Campbell County, Tennessee is named
- Vin Campbell (Arthur Vincent Campbell, 1888–1969), Major League Baseball player
- Arthur Grant Campbell (1916–1996), Canadian diplomat
- Arthur Campbell (chemist) (1925–2020), New Zealand chemist

== Fictional characters ==
- Arthur Campbell (Last Exile), a character in the anime series Last Exile
