= Kenneth Campbell =

Kenneth, Ken or Kenny Campbell may refer to:

== Actors ==
- Ken Campbell (1941–2008), English writer, actor, director and comedian
- J. Kenneth Campbell (born 1947), American film, stage, and television actor
- Ken Hudson Campbell (born 1962), American actor

== Sportsmen ==
- Kenny Campbell (1892–1971), Scottish football goalkeeper
- Ken Campbell (basketball) (1926–1999), American forward
- Ken Campbell (American football) (born 1938), end for Titans of New York
- Ken Campbell (swimmer) (born 1949), Canadian 1968 Olympian
- Kenneth Campbell (boxer) (born 1949), Jamaican Olympic bantamweight

== Others ==
- Kenneth Campbell (politician) (1881–1951), Canadian legislator from British Columbia
- Kenneth Campbell (VC) (1917–1941), Scottish airman in Second World War
- Ken Campbell (palaeontologist) (1927–2017), Australian geologist and academic
- Ken Campbell (evangelist) (1934–2006), Canadian fundamentalist Baptist and politician
