= Bill Campbell (footballer, born 1904) =

Australian rules footballer (1904–2007)

Personal information
- Full name: William Campbell
- Born: 3 December 1904
- Died: 19 March 2007 (aged 102)
- Original team: Huntly

Playing career^{1}
Years	Club	Games (Goals)
1929	North Melbourne	2 (0)
- ^{1} Playing statistics correct to the end of 1929.

Bill Campbell (3 December 1904 – 19 March 2007) was an Australian rules footballer who played for the North Melbourne Football Club in the Victorian Football League (VFL). He was the fourth ex-VFL player to live to be more than 100 years old.

Campbell grew up in Whipstick Gully, north of Bendigo and played for Huntly Football Club. He was a member of their 1925 premiership team in the Neilborough District Football Association.
