= Samuel Campbell =

Samuel or Sam Campbell may refer to:

- Samuel Campbell (American politician) (1773–1853), U.S. Representative from New York
- Samuel Campbell (Canadian politician) (1788–1851), politician from Nova Scotia
- Samuel Campbell (doctor), HMS Plumper ship's surgeon, 1857–1861; namesake of several locations in Canada
- Samuel Campbell (New York state senator) (1809–1885), New York politician
- Samuel B. Campbell (1846–1917), Republican politician in the state of Ohio
- Samuel James Campbell (1892–1981), businessman from Mount Carroll, Illinois
- Sam Campbell (writer) (1895–1962), writer, lecturer, and photographer
- Sam Campbell (baseball), 19th-century baseball player
- Sam Campbell (equestrian) (born 1944), Australian Olympic equestrian
- Sam Campbell (footballer) (1892–1918), Australian rules footballer
- Sam Campbell (comedian) (born 1991 or 1992), Australian stand-up comedian and actor

== In fiction ==
- Samuel Campbell, a character from the television show Supernatural
