= Joseph Campbell (footballer) =

English footballer

Personal information
- Date of birth: 1903
- Place of birth: Walker, England
- Position: Wing half

Senior career*
Years	Team	Apps	(Gls)
- Hull City
1927–1928	Bradford City	1	(0)
- Yeovil and Petters United
- * Club domestic league appearances and goals

Joseph Campbell (born 1903) was an English professional footballer who played as a wing half.

== Career ==
Born in Walker, Campbell played for Hull City, Bradford City and Yeovil and Petters United. For Bradford City, he made 1 appearance in the Football League.

== Sources ==
- Frost, Terry (1988). Bradford City A Complete Record 1903–1988. Breedon Books Sport. ISBN 0-907969-38-0.
