= Joseph Campbell (21st-century Maine politician) =

American politician

Member-elect of the Maine House of Representatives from the 107th district
- Assuming office December 2026
- Succeeding: Mark Cooper

Personal details
- Party: Democratic

Joseph A. Campbell is an American politician. A member of the Democratic Party, he is the member-elect for the 107th district of the Maine House of Representatives.
