= Andrew Campbell (legal scholar) =

British academic

Andrew Campbell is a Scottish academic, solicitor, writer and editor specialising in the fields of international banking and finance law. He currently is a professor of international banking and finance law at the University of Leeds, England. He regularly acts as Consulting Counsel for the International Monetary Fund, Washington D.C. In 2007 Campbell became a member of the advisory panel of the International Association of Deposit Insurers.

Campbell is the older brother of Irene Campbell, the Labour MP for North Ayrshire and Arran.

== Biography ==
Campbell was born in Ayrshire, Scotland, and has lived in several countries including Canada and the US. He currently resides in Aberystwyth, Wales with his wife with whom he has two daughters, Marianne and Elise.

== Career ==
Campbell graduated with an LLB from the then University of Wales, Aberystwyth in 1988. From there he qualified as a solicitor before becoming an academic in 1991, starting at the then University of Aberystwyth. In the 90s Campbell began making a name for himself in the field of International Banking Law and Finance which led to his becoming Consulting Counsel to the IMF in 2000. In 2004 Campbell moved to the University of Leeds, becoming a Professor in 2010. In 2021, Campbell returned to Aberystwyth University as a Professor and lecturer in law.

Campbell's scholarly and research interests include bank insolvency, protecting bank depositors, bank regulation, Islamic banking and money laundering.

Campbell has been contacted by the media to comment on various issues. He has appeared regularly on BBC Radio Scotland as well as having given many interviews to national newspapers, such as Scotland on Sunday and the Sunday Herald, in Scotland and England.

== Books ==
- Campbell, Andrew, and Peter Cartwright. Banks in Crisis: The Legal Response. Aldershot, Hampshire, England: Ashgate, 2002.
- Campbell, Andrew et al. Butterworths Annotated Guide to the Financial Services and Markets Act 2000 (Second Edition, London: LexisNexis, 2005).
- Campbell, Andrew et al. Deposit Insurance (Palgrave MacMillan, 2007).
- Campbell, Andrew, and Peter Cartwright. Routledge Revivals - Banks in Crisis: The Legal Response. (Routledge, 2017)
