= Christopher Campbell (painter) =

Irish artist (1908–1972)

- Self portrait 1935
- Born: 9 December 1908; Dublin, Ireland
- Died: 1972 (aged 63–64); Dublin, Ireland
- Occupation: Painter

Christopher Campbell (9 December 1908 – 1972) was an Irish painter. As well as a painter, Campbell also worked with stained glass.

== Life ==
Christopher Campbell was born in Dublin on 9 December 1908. His parents were John, a carpenter, of 18 Hardwicke Street, and Ellen Campbell (née Farrell). He had four brothers and three sisters. His younger brother, Laurence, was a sculptor. Their father died when Christopher was a child. He attended CBS, St Mary's Place and later at the Dublin Metropolitan School of Art. He studied under George Atkinson and Patrick Touhy.

He worked in Harry Clarke's studio in the 1930s, and his work was used in stained glass windows in several churches in Ireland. From the 1930s onwards, he produced numerous self portraits as paintings and drawings. He also taught art at the Kilkenny Technical School between 1947 and 1951.

His work was part of the painting event in the art competition at the 1948 Summer Olympics. He worked as an illustrator for the Capuchin Annual between 1953 and 1969. He first exhibited with the Royal Hibernian Academy in 1920, regularly submitting between 1930 and 1971 from his home on Brian Road, Marino. Beginning in 1958 his submitted work was almost exclusively watercolour stained glass designs. His work was featured in the 1941 Academy of Christian Art exhibition in Dublin and the 1941 Munster Fine Art Club exhibition.

Campbell died in Dublin in 1972. An exhibition of his work was held in the Neptune Gallery, South William Street in 1976. His work can be found in the collections of the Hugh Lane Gallery and the Ulster Museum.
