= Peter Campbell (Australian footballer, born 1938) =

Australian rules footballer

Personal information
- Full name: Peter Campbell
- Born: 1 April 1938
- Died: 14 November 2026; Geelong
- Original team: Lorne

Playing career^{1}
Years	Club	Games (Goals)
1958	Geelong	6 (4)
- ^{1} Playing statistics correct to the end of 1958.

Peter Campbell (1 April 1938) is a former Australian rules footballer who played with Geelong in the Victorian Football League (VFL).

A centre half-forward originally from Lorne, Victoria, he made his debut during the 1958 VFL season.
