= Rebecca Campbell (scientist) =

Neuroendocrinologist in New Zealand

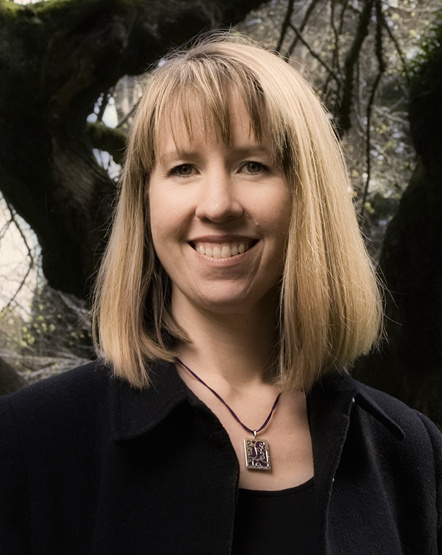
- Campbell in 2009
- Education: Oregon Health and Science University
- Awards: Early Career Award for Distinction in Research
- Scientific career
- Fields: Physiology
- Workplaces: University of Otago
- Thesis: The role of neuropeptide Y in the hypothalamic integration of signals mediating energy balance and reproductive function (2002)

Rebecca Elaine Lyle Campbell (née Lyle) is a New Zealand neuroendocrinologist. She is a full professor at the University of Otago, specialising in understanding the regulation of fertility, and polyendocrine metabolic ovarian syndrome (PMOS).

== Academic career ==
Campbell earned a PhD at the Oregon Health and Science University in 2002, with a thesis on neuropeptide Y and fertility. Campbell joined the Centre for Neuroendocrinology at the University of Otago as a postdoctoral researcher, before joining the faculty in 2009. She was promoted to associate professor in 2018 and full professor in 2022. She is deputy director of the Centre for Neuroendocrinology, and has been the Associate Dean Research for the School of Biomedical Sciences.

Campbell's is a neuroendocrinologist, with a particular interest in how fertility is regulated by the brain. Campbell studies how androgen levels affect the brain in women with polyendocrine metabolic ovarian syndrome (PMOS). Her team have identified brain changes that might lead to possible treatments for PMOS. Campbell is also interested in other non-fertility-related roles of gonadotropin-releasing hormone ( GnRH ) neurons, and in 2023 was awarded a Marsden grant to study the role of distinct populations of GnRH neurons in the brain. Campbell was the principal investigator on three earlier Marsden grants, Primary cilia and the central regulation of fertility (funded in 2010), Functional dissection of a novel GABAergic pathway in the brain circuitry controlling fertility (2014), and Androgen excess and the female brain (funded in 2017). She was an associate investigator on another 2017 Marsden grant Defining the brain circuits that interface hunger state with reward signalling to guide food consumption.

Campbell also leads a Health Research Council-funded project to research how the brain controls fertility.

Campbell is a member of the Maurice Wilkins Centre of Research Excellence Leadership Forum.

== Honours and awards ==
Campbell was awarded the School of Biomedical Sciences Distinguished Researcher Award in 2020.

== Selected works ==
- Wintermantel, Tim M; Campbell, Rebecca Elaine; Porteous, Robert; et al. (2006). "Definition of estrogen receptor pathway critical for estrogen positive feedback to gonadotropin-releasing hormone neurons and fertility". Neuron. 52 (2): 271–280. doi:10.1016/j.neuron.2006.07.023. PMC 6116893. PMID 17046690. Wikidata Q48394948.
- Irene Cimino; Casoni, Filippo; Xinhuai Liu; et al. (2016). "Novel role for anti-Müllerian hormone in the regulation of GnRH neuron excitability and hormone secretion". Nature Communications. 7 (1) 10055. Bibcode:2016NatCo...710055C. doi:10.1038/ncomms10055. PMC 4729924. PMID 26753790. Wikidata Q34508533.
- Stener-Victorin, Elisabet; Vasantha Padmanabhan; Kirsty A Walters; Campbell, Rebecca Elaine; Anna Benrick; Paolo Giacobini; Daniel A Dumesic; David H Abbott (2020). "Animal models to understand the etiology and pathophysiology of polycystic ovary syndrome". Endocrine Reviews. 41 (4). doi:10.1210/endrev/bnaa010. PMC 7279705. PMID 32310267. Wikidata Q92075063.
- Aleisha M Moore; Mel Prescott; Christopher J Marshall; Siew Hoong Yip; Campbell, Rebecca Elaine (2014). "Enhancement of a robust arcuate GABAergic input to gonadotropin-releasing hormone neurons in a model of polycystic ovarian syndrome". Proceedings of the National Academy of Sciences of the United States of America. 112 (2): 596–601. Bibcode:2015PNAS..112..596M. doi:10.1073/pnas.1415038112. PMC 4299257. PMID 25550522. Wikidata Q34985720.
- Siew Hoong Yip; Boehm, Ulrich; Herbison, Allan Edward; Campbell, Rebecca Elaine (2015). "Conditional Viral Tract Tracing Delineates the Projections of the Distinct Kisspeptin Neuron Populations to Gonadotropin-Releasing Hormone (GnRH) Neurons in the Mouse". Endocrinology. 156 (7): 2582–2594. doi:10.1210/en.2015-1131. PMID 25856430. Wikidata Q41097811.
- Czieselsky, Katja; Mel Prescott; Robert Porteous; Campos, Pauline; Clarkson, Jenny; Steyn, Frederik; Campbell, Rebecca Elaine; Herbison, Allan Edward (2016). "Pulse and Surge Profiles of Luteinizing Hormone Secretion in the Mouse". Endocrinology. 157 (12): 4794–4802. doi:10.1210/en.2016-1351. PMID 27715255. Wikidata Q42500196.
- Campbell, Rebecca Elaine; J M ffrench-Mullen; Cowley, Michael Alexander; M S Smith; K L Grove (2001). "Hypothalamic circuitry of neuropeptide Y regulation of neuroendocrine function and food intake via the Y5 receptor subtype". Neuroendocrinology. 74 (2): 106–119. doi:10.1159/000054676. PMID 11474218. Wikidata Q74269103.
