= Lorneville =

Lorneville may refer to:

- Lorneville, New Zealand
- Lorneville, New Brunswick
- Lorneville, Nova Scotia
- Lorneville, Ontario
