= Wendy Campbell-Purdie =

New Zealand tree planter (1925–1985)

Wendy Campbell-Purdie (1925 – 1985) was a New Zealand tree-planter who worked with a British timber firm in Corsica. She became an international tree-planting leader and she advocated for an awareness of the value of trees. She believed that by planting trees in desert areas, one could halt the spread of the desert, make topsoil and provide food for both people and livestock. She also hoped to create microclimates that would make rain more likely.

== Biography ==
She was born around 1925 in New Zealand, the daughter of farmers. When travel became easier after the Second World War she set off on a traditional grand tour. Her love of trees began in Corsica where she worked for a logging company for five years.

In Hampshire, England, she called upon the tree expert Richard St. Barbe Baker in 1960, and learned about his idea that green wall agriculture could tame the desert. Campbell-Purdie went to a desert in Tiznit, Morocco, in 1964, and created an oasis with 2,000 trees that she planted. After Algerian Independence, Campbell-Purdie travelled to Algeria, where she was given a 100 hectare plot which had once been a French military dump covered in sheet metal and which received much of the town's waste water. Campbell-Purdie successfully planted 1,000 seedlings and one year later, 800 were still alive. Within four years, some were 12 feet high and she found grain growing among them. The Algerian government subsequently offered help and Campbell-Purdie ended up planting 130,000 trees in and around Bou Saada, Algeria under the aegis of the Algerian Red Crescent.

Campbell-Purdie formed the Bou Saada Trust to raise funds to support her "war against the Sahara." Her successes inspired the Algerian government to plant a 12-meter-wide wall of trees from border-to-border across that country.

She left Algeria in 1970, when her health broke down. She appeared as herself on the television game show "To Tell the Truth" in 1973.

Campbell-Purdie died in Athens, Greece, on 20 January 1985, aged 59.

== Publication ==
- Campbell-Purdie, Wendy, Fenner Brockway, Iris Murdoch, and John Boyd Orr Boyd-Orr. "Woman against the desert." (1967).
