= Steven Campbell =

Steven, Stephen, or Steve Campbell may refer to:

- Stephen Campbell (1897–1966), Guyanese politician
- Stephen Campbell (diplomat), US diplomat, served as Consul General in Jerusalem 1967–1971
- Steven Campbell (artist) (1953–2007), Scottish artist
- Steven Campbell (footballer) (born 1986), Australian footballer
- Stephen Campbell Moore (born 1979), English actor
- Stevie Campbell (born 1967), Scottish footballer
- Steve Campbell (American football) (born 1966), American college football head coach
- Steve Campbell (tennis) (born 1970), American tennis player
- Steve Campbell (snooker player) (born 1966), English snooker player

== See also ==
- Campbell Stephen (1884–1947), Scottish politician
