= Roy Campbell =

Roy Campbell may refer to:

- Roy Campbell (poet) (1901–1957), South African poet
- Roy Campbell Jr. (1952–2014), American jazz musician
- Roy Edward Campbell (born 1947), American Catholic bishop
- Roy H. Campbell, British computer scientist
- Colonel Roy Campbell, character in the Metal Gear series of video games

== See also ==
- Roy Campbell-Moore (born 1951), Scottish dancer and choreographer
