= Grace Campbell (writer) =

Canadian novelist

- Born: March 18, 1895; Williamstown, Ontario, Canada
- Died: May 31, 1963 (aged 68); Niagara-on-the-Lake, Ontario, Canada
- Occupation: Writer (novelist)
- Spouse: Harvey Campbell (m. 1919)
- Writing career
- Period: 20th century
- Genre: Historical fiction

Grace Maclennan Grant Campbell (March 18, 1895 – May 31, 1963) was a Canadian novelist and short story writer.

== Biography ==
Campbell was born in Williamstown, Ontario. Her father, Alexander Grant and Caroline MacLennan were farmers. She attended Queen's University where she studied English literature. Graduating in 1915 as one of the top students in her class, she taught for three years before marrying Henry Campbell in 1919. She had three sons, including twins; both were killed fighting in World War II in France. Campbell produced six novels and numerous short stories. Her stories focus on character development rather than depictions of scenery.

Campbell is best known for her historical novels. Her first, Thorn-Apple Tree (1942), focuses on pioneer life in eastern Ontario. The book was met with critical acclaim and sold well. She published five more novels each dealing with historical themes. In Fresh Wind Blowing, the theme is about Canadian soldiers fighting in western Europe during the World War II.

Campbell moved several times in her life, residing in Regina, Saskatchewan; Montreal, and Arvida, Quebec. She spent her final days in Niagara-on-the-Lake, Ontario where she died in 1963.

== Works ==
- Thorn-Apple Tree (1942) (illustrated and designed by Franklin Carmichael)
- The Higher Hill (1944)
- Fresh Wind Blowing (1947)
- The Tower And The Town (1950)
- Torbeg (1953)
- Highland Heritage (1962)
