= Lorne Campbell =

Lorne Campbell may refer to:

- Lorne Campbell (ice hockey) (1879–1957), Canadian ice hockey player
- Lorne Campbell (art historian) (born 1946), Scottish art historian
- Lorne Argyle Campbell (1871–1947), businessman and political figure in British Columbia
- Lorne MacLaine Campbell (1902–1991), Scottish recipient of the Victoria Cross
- A. Lorne Campbell (1920–2014), Canadian lawyer and president of the Canadian Bar Association
- Lorne Edgar Campbell (1948-), Canadian outlaw biker.

== See also ==
- Alastair Lorne Campbell of Airds (1937–2022), Scottish officer of arms and author
- John Lorne Campbell (1906–1996), Scottish historian, farmer, environmentalist and folklore scholar
- Lorne Campbell Webster (1871–1941), financier and political figure in Quebec
