= Harvey Campbell (Canadian football) =

Canadian football player

Profile
- Position: Guard

Personal information
- Born: c. 1940 (age 85–86)
- Listed height: 5 ft 11 in (1.80 m)
- Listed weight: 215 lb (98 kg)

Career history
- 1961: Saskatchewan Roughriders

Harvey Campbell (born c. 1940) is a former Canadian football player who played for the Saskatchewan Roughriders.
