= Psyiconic =

American influencer (born 1995)

- Born: Kelon Campbell; July 18, 1995 (age 31)
- Other name: Itzpsyiconic
- Occupations: Influencer; comedian
- Years active: 2020–present

TikTok information
- Page: _itzpsyiconic_
- Followers: 3.3 million
- Last updated: December 18, 2025

Kelon Campbell (born July 18, 1995), known online as Psyiconic, is an American influencer and comedian. He is best known for portraying the satirical character of Terri Joe, a homophobic, racist, Southern and Christian woman, whom he rose to fame portraying on TikTok in livestreams starting in 2022.

== Life and career ==
Kelon Campbell was born on July 18, 1995, and raised in Humble, Texas. He has three brothers, among whom he has described himself as the "odd one out" for his affinity for pop music and other "gay stuff". He has also said that he was "very shy" growing up.

In 2020, during the COVID-19 pandemic, he began livestreaming on his TikTok account under the name Psyiconic in a "grandma costume" he wore for a previous Halloween. While working for a technology startup in 2022, he began livestreaming as the character Jeorgia Peach, a party girl from Los Angeles, improvising his interactions with others on the platform. He also created and portrayed the character of Amethyst Jade, a goth vampire from Salem, Massachusetts. He later started livestreaming as the satirical character of Terri Joe, a "devout Christian, Caucasian, heterosexual woman" who wears a floral print dress and a cross necklace and is a paraplegic who uses a wheelchair. He based her on characters from the television series True Blood, particularly Maxine Fortenberry. As Terri Joe, he appears in front of a green screen and roasts those who joined his livestreams as "homaseckshas" (a Southern pronunciation of "homosexuals") and frequently breaks character by laughing.

Clips of his livestream highlights, uploaded by fans, went viral on Twitter. By April 2022, he began doing TikTok livestreams full-time. Also in 2022, he did livestreams as Terri Joe with various celebrities, starting with Doja Cat and later including Madonna, Hunter Schafer, James Charles, Bob the Drag Queen, Ziwe, Lizzo, Kali Uchis and Baby Tate. Kaiya Shunyata wrote in 2022 for The Daily Dot that Campbell had "attracted a largely queer, and sometimes famous, fanbase". By late 2022, he had over one million followers on TikTok. Campbell was included on TikTok's inaugural Visionary Voices list, which honored Black creators on the platform. In March 2023, Campbell created and began portraying the British character Amoura Rose on TikTok. By June 2023, Campbell had more than 2.4 million followers on TikTok. He appeared as Terri Joe in a promotional video for a Victoria Monét remix of the Summer Walker song "Girls Need Love" in October 2023.

In October 2024, a feature film starring Campbell as Terri Joe was greenlit by Tubi's Stubios program for aspiring filmmakers. The film, Terri Joe: Missionary in Miami, depicts Terri Joe escaping to Miami, where her cousin Jeorgia Peach is staying for Miami Swim Week, after witnessing a robbery at her job and being tracked down by the perpetrators. It premiered in January 2026.

== Public image ==
In 2023, Tobias Hess of Paper called Campbell "a staple of TikTok". Alexander Cole of HotNewHipHop described the character of Terri Joe as "very quick-witted" and "irreverent", also writing, "If you are someone who watches a lot of TikTok, then you have certainly heard of Terri Joe at some point." Queerty's Charlie Grey similarly wrote in 2023, "Anyone's who's scrolled through their TikTok 'For You' page and come across a Live video has likely seen Kelon by now," and compared Terri Joe to The Boondocks character Uncle Ruckus. Campbell has compared his roasting style of comedy to that of drag queen Bianca Del Rio. He is queer.

== Filmography ==
- 2026: Terri Joe: Missionary In Miami
