= Fred Campbell (English footballer) =

English footballer

Personal information
- Full name: T. Frederick Campbell
- Place of birth: Burnley, England
- Position: Full back

Senior career*
Years	Team	Apps	(Gls)
1905–1906	Burnley	9	(0)
	Queens Park Rangers	?	(?)
- * Club domestic league appearances and goals

T. Frederick Campbell was an English professional footballer who played as a full back. He was born in Burnley and played in the Football League for his hometown club during the 1905–06 season.
