= Dugald Campbell =

Scottish doctor (1858–1940)

Dugald Campbell (25 January 1858 – 16 November 1940) was a Scottish doctor from the Isle of Arran, who went to the Hawaiian Kingdom and set up the national health service during the 1890s. Campbell travelled extensively and in Hawaii he took up the post of government physician on the islands, where he set about raising cash for a hospital that would treat all islanders for free.

Campbell was born at the manse in Lamlash, the sixth son of Rev. Colin Fisher Campbell and Anne Mary McMillan. He was educated at the University of Glasgow and earned his doctorate in medicine from Edinburgh University. He came first to Kauai, where he was government physician in Waimea. In 1890, he married Canadian Mabel Sidney Rhodes in Honolulu. He died in 1940 in Lamlash, three years after his wife.

Campbell is thought to be the great-great-grandfather of British author J.K. Rowling.
