= Harvey Campbell (politician) =

American politician

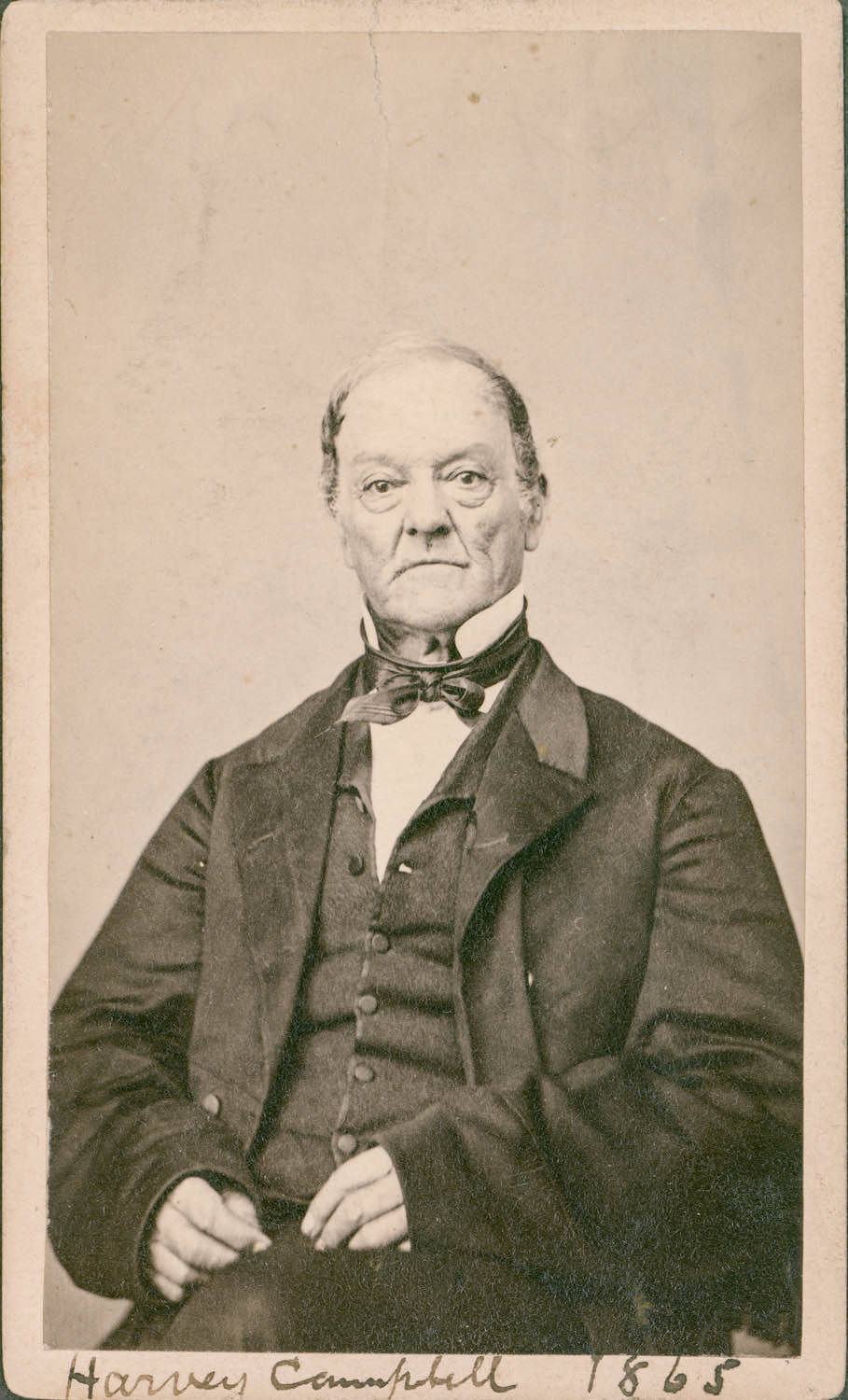
- Born: September 30, 1792; Voluntown
- Died: September 16, 1877; Groton
- Education: Yale School of Medicine
- Occupations: Politician; medical doctor

Harvey Campbell (September 30, 1792 – September 16, 1877) was an American medical doctor and politician.

Campbell was the son of Dr. Allen and Sarah Campbell (née Kinne), and was born in Voluntown, Connecticut on 30 September 1792. He studied medicine with his father (long a successful physician in Eastern Connecticut) and afterwards in Yale Medical School, where he graduated in 1816. He settled in his native town and enjoyed a large practice. He was also interested in public affairs, and in 1861 was elected as a member of the Connecticut State Senate for district 13.

He married Sarah Cook, and after her death her sister, Eliza Cook, who also died before him. He died in Groton, Connecticut, September 16, 1877, at the age of 85. He left two sons and six daughters.
