= Marvin Campbell (politician) =

American politician (1849–1930)

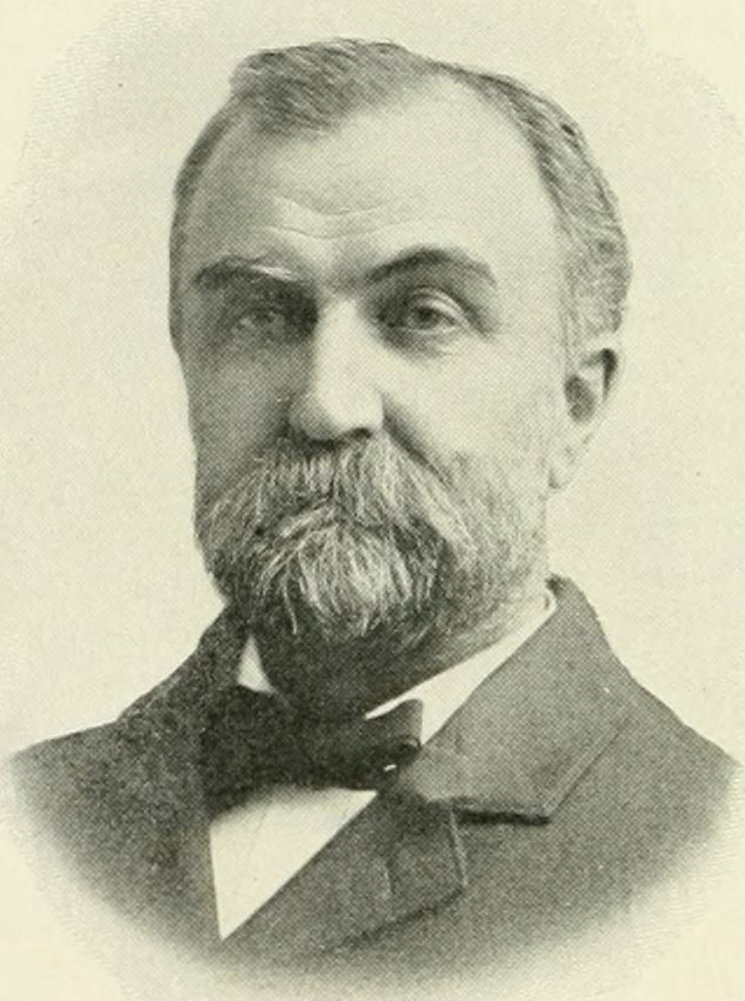
- Campbell in 1901 publication

Member of the Indiana Senate
- In office 1883–1887

Personal details
- Born: March 13, 1849 Valparaiso, Indiana, U.S.
- Died: January 1, 1930 (aged 80) South Bend, Indiana, U.S.
- Spouse: Lydia A. Brownfield (m. 1874, died)
- Children: 3
- Education: Valparaiso Male and Female College
- Occupation: Politician; businessman; educator

Marvin Campbell (March 13, 1849 – January 1, 1930) was a politician and businessman from Indiana. He served as a member of the Indiana Senate from 1883 to 1887. He was one of the founders and president of the Campbell Paper Box Company.

== Early life ==
Marvin Campbell was born on March 13, 1849, in Valparaiso, Indiana, to Harriett (née Cornell) and Samuel A. Campbell. He grew up on a farm and attended country schools. He took a course at Valparaiso Male and Female College. He had a twin brother, Myron Campbell (1849–1916).

== Career ==
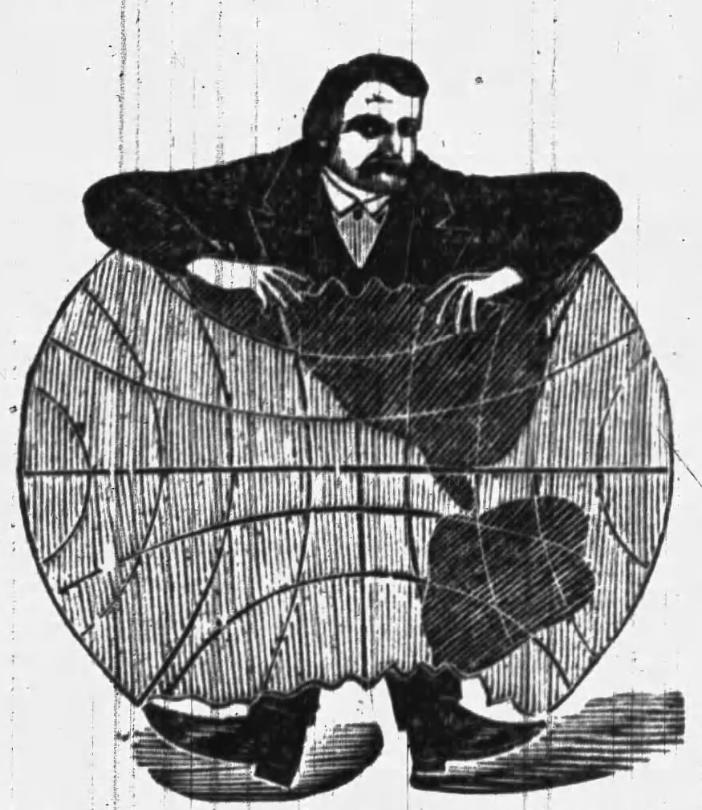
Advertisement of Marvin Campbell, the "Hardware Man" in 1876

In 1869, Campbell taught mathematics at Valparaiso High School and in 1870, he became a teacher at South Bend High School in South Bend, Indiana. He taught at South Bend for two years. In 1872, Campbell quit teaching and took up the hardware business in South Bend. In 1879, he moved his hardware business to Market Street. He worked in the hardware business for twelve years. Campbell joined the Mishawaka Woolen Manufacturing Company (later the Mishawaka Rubber & Woolen Manufacturing Company). He would later become a director and treasurer of the company.

From 1883 to 1887, Campbell served in the Indiana Senate, representing St. Joseph and Starke counties.

In 1889, Campbell joined the Studebaker Bros. Manufacturing Company as a purchasing agent. He remained in that role until 1893. He then became manager of the sales department and remained in that role until January 1, 1899. Around 1893, Campbell, his brother Myron and William H. Barger formed the Campbell Paper Box Company. He served as president of Campbell Paper Box company and the Citizens' Trust and Savings Bank until his death.

Campbell was president of the South Bend National Bank in 1901, president of the board of trustees of Epworth Hospital and president of the board of trustees of the First Methodist Episcopal Church. He was a delegate at the General Conference of the Methodist Church in 1904. He was a member of the board of trustees of DePauw University.

== Personal life ==
Campbell married Lydia A. Brownfield, daughter of John Brownfield, in 1874. They had three children. His wife predeceased him. He was a member of the Methodist Episcopal Church.

Campbell lived at 339 West Colfax Avenue in South Bend. Towards the end of his life, Campbell owned a farm in Clay Township.

Campbell died on January 1, 1930, at the home of his daughter in South Bend.
