= List of St Mirren F.C. seasons =

This is a list of St Mirren Football Club seasons up to the present day. The list details St Mirren's record in major league and cup competitions, and the club's top league goal scorer of each season. Top scorers in bold were also the top scorers in St Mirren's division that season. Records of regular minor competitions, such as the Renfrewshire Cup which the club has won 55 times, are not included.

== Summary ==
Chart of the club's yearly table positions in the Scottish league.

Founded in 1877, Paisley-based St Mirren have spent the majority of their history in the top division of the Scottish football league system, having been one of the founder members of the Scottish Football League in 1890. They have never won the competition, finishing 3rd in 1893, matched 87 years later in 1980.

The early 1980s were a strong period for the club as they qualified for the UEFA Cup through league position on three occasions, and also entered the European Cup Winners' Cup after winning the 1987 Scottish Cup Final, the last time the trophy was claimed by a team with an entirely Scottish line-up. That was their third victory in the competition, after success in 1926 and 1959, in their sixth final overall. Following two of those wins, informal 'challenges' over two legs were played against the English FA Cup winners, resulting in a win over Nottingham Forest in 1959; the second leg of the 1987 tie against Coventry City was never completed.

Saints have also won the Scottish League Cup once, in 2013 after finishing runners-up twice (1955, 2010), and also claimed minor honours such as the Scottish Challenge Cup and the defunct Anglo-Scottish Cup once each, as well as the wartime 1919 Victory Cup and 1943 Summer Cup trophies.

== Seasons ==
Key

Champions	Runners-up	3rd / Semi-final	Promoted	Relegated

Season	League		Scottish Cup	League Cup	Europe / Other	Top league scorer(s)	
Season	Division	Position	Scottish Cup	League Cup	Europe / Other	Top league scorer(s)	
1880–81	N/A (Note: The Scottish Football League was established in 1890.)	N/A	Fifth round (Note: St Mirren did not enter the Scottish Cup until the 1880–81 season.)	N/A	N/A	Unknown	Unknown
1881–82	N/A	N/A	Second round	N/A	N/A	Unknown	Unknown
1882–83 (Note: First season playing home matches at Westmarch.)	N/A	N/A	Second round	N/A	N/A	Unknown	Unknown
1883–84	N/A	N/A	Third round	N/A	N/A	Unknown	Unknown
1884–85	N/A	N/A	Fourth round	N/A	N/A	Unknown	Unknown
1885–86	N/A	N/A	First round	N/A	N/A	Unknown	Unknown
1886–87	N/A	N/A	Second round	N/A	N/A	Unknown	Unknown
1887–88	N/A	N/A	Fifth round	N/A	N/A	Unknown	Unknown
1888–89	N/A	N/A	Sixth round	N/A	Exhibition Cup; Semi-final	Unknown	Unknown
1889–90	N/A	N/A	Fifth round	N/A	N/A	Unknown	Unknown
1890–91	Scottish Football League (Note: The league had only one division until the 1893–94 season.)	8th	Fifth round	N/A	N/A	Unknown	Unknown
1891–92	Scottish Football League	10th	First round	N/A	N/A	Unknown	Unknown
1892–93	Scottish Football League	3rd	Third round	N/A	N/A	Unknown	Unknown
1893–94 (Note: Last season playing home matches at Westmarch.)	Division One	6th	Second round	N/A	N/A	Unknown	Unknown
1894–95 (Note: First season playing home matches at St Mirren Park (Love Street).)	Division One	5th	Second round	N/A	N/A	Unknown	Unknown
1895–96	Division One	8th	Second round	N/A	N/A	Unknown	Unknown
1896–97	Division One	6th	Second round	N/A	N/A	Unknown	Unknown
1897–98	Division One	5th	Second round	N/A	N/A	Unknown	Unknown
1898–99	Division One	5th	Semi-final	N/A	Western League; Winners	Unknown	Unknown
1899–1900	Division One	8th	First round	N/A	N/A	Unknown	Unknown
1900–01	Division One	9th	Semi-final	N/A	N/A	Unknown	Unknown
1901–02	Division One	4th	Semi-final	N/A	Exhibition Cup; Quarter-final	Unknown	Unknown
1902–03	Division One	6th	First round	N/A	Glasgow Charity Cup; Runners-up	Unknown	Unknown
1903–04	Division One	6th	Third round	N/A	N/A	Unknown	Unknown
1904–05	Division One	10th	Third round	N/A	N/A	Unknown	Unknown
1905–06	Division One	8th	Semi-final	N/A	N/A	Unknown	Unknown
1906–07	Division One	7th	Third round	N/A	N/A	Unknown	Unknown
1907–08	Division One	7th	Runners-up	N/A	N/A	Unknown	Unknown
1908–09	Division One	7th	Third round	N/A	N/A	Unknown	Unknown
1909–10	Division One	12th	Second round	N/A	N/A	Unknown	Unknown
1910–11	Division One	12th	First round	N/A	N/A	Unknown	Unknown
1911–12	Division One	18th	First round	N/A	N/A	Unknown	Unknown
1912–13	Division One	12th	Fourth round	N/A	N/A	Unknown	Unknown
1913–14	Division One	20th	Semi-final	N/A	N/A	Unknown	Unknown
1914–15	Division One	9th	N/A (Note: The Scottish Cup was not held in the 1914–15, 1915–16, 1916–17, 1917–18 or 1918–19 seasons due to World War I, or the 1939–40, 1940–41, 1941–42, 1942–43, 1943–44, 1944–45 or 1945–46 seasons due to World War II.)	N/A	War Fund Shield; Semi-final	Unknown	Unknown
1915–16	Division One	13th	N/A	N/A	N/A	Unknown	Unknown
1916–17	Division One	7th	N/A	N/A	N/A	Unknown	Unknown
1917–18	Division One	11th	N/A	N/A	War Fund Shield; Quarter-final	Unknown	Unknown
1918–19	Division One	10th	N/A	N/A	Victory Cup – Winners	Unknown	Unknown
1919–20	Division One	12th	Second round	N/A	N/A	Unknown	Unknown
1920–21	Division One	22nd (Note: St Mirren finished bottom of the table, but the second division was not re-introduced until the following year so no relegation was applied.)	First round	N/A	N/A	Unknown	Unknown
1921–22	Division One	8th	Fourth round	N/A	N/A	**Duncan Walker**	45 (Note: League goals only; top scorer in division.)
1922–23	Division One	6th	Second round	N/A	N/A	Unknown	Unknown
1923–24	Division One	6th	Second round	N/A	N/A	Unknown	Unknown
1924–25	Division One	6th	Fourth round	N/A	N/A	Unknown	Unknown
1925–26	Division One	4th	Winners	N/A	N/A	Unknown	Unknown
1926–27	Division One	10th	Second round	N/A	N/A	Unknown	Unknown
1927–28	Division One	5th	Third round	N/A	N/A	Unknown	Unknown
1928–29	Division One	8th	Semi-final	N/A	N/A	Unknown	Unknown
1929–30	Division One	5th	Fourth round	N/A	N/A	Unknown	Unknown
1930–31	Division One	15th	Semi-final	N/A	N/A	Unknown	Unknown
1931–32	Division One	5th	First round	N/A	N/A	Unknown	Unknown
1932–33	Division One	7th	Second round	N/A	N/A	Unknown	Unknown
1933–34	Division One	17th	Runners-up	N/A	N/A	Unknown	Unknown
1934–35	Division One	19th	Third round	N/A	N/A	Unknown	Unknown
1935–36	Division Two	2nd	Third round	N/A	N/A	Unknown	Unknown
1936–37	Division One	16th	Fourth round	N/A	N/A	Unknown	Unknown
1937–38	Division One	14th	Second round	N/A	N/A	Unknown	Unknown
1938–39	Division One	18th	Third round	N/A	N/A	Unknown	Unknown
1939–40	Emergency League West (Note: The official Scottish Football League was suspended from 1939 to 1946 due to World War II. Unofficial competitions were held.)	11th	N/A	N/A	Emergency Cup – Quarter-final	Unknown	Unknown
1940–41	Southern League	7th	N/A	Southern League Cup – Semi-final	Summer Cup – Second round	Unknown	Unknown
1941–42	Southern League	11th	N/A	Southern League Cup – Group stage	Summer Cup – First round	Unknown	Unknown
1942–43	Southern League	12th	N/A	Southern League Cup – Group stage	Summer Cup – Winners	Unknown	Unknown
1943–44	Southern League	13th	N/A	Southern League Cup – Group stage	Summer Cup – Second round	Unknown	Unknown
1944–45	Southern League	14th	N/A	Southern League Cup – Group stage	Summer Cup – First round	Unknown	Unknown
1945–46	Southern League	14th	N/A	Southern League Cup – Group stage	Victory Cup – Second round	Unknown	Unknown
1946–47	Division A	14th	First round	Group stage	N/A	Unknown	Unknown
1947–48	Division A	5th	Fourth round	Group stage	N/A	Unknown	Unknown
1948–49	Division A	9th	Second round	Quarter-final	N/A	Unknown	Unknown
1949–50	Division A	11th	First round	Group stage	N/A	Unknown	Unknown
1950–51	Division A	11th	First round	Group stage	N/A	Unknown	Unknown
1951–52	Division A	14th	Second round	Group stage	St Mungo Cup; Quarter-final	Unknown	Unknown
1952–53	Division A	6th	Second round	Group stage	N/A	Unknown	Unknown
1953–54	Division A	11th	First round	Group stage	N/A	Unknown	Unknown
1954–55	Division A	6th	Fifth round	Group stage	N/A	Unknown	Unknown
1955–56	Division One	15th	Sixth round	Runners-up	N/A	Unknown	Unknown
1956–57	Division One	12th	Quarter-final	Group stage	N/A	Unknown	Unknown
1957–58	Division One	13th	Second round	Group stage	N/A	Unknown	Unknown
1958–59	Division One	7th	Winners	Group stage	N/A	Unknown	Unknown
1959–60	Division One	14th	Second round	Group stage	N/A	Unknown	Unknown
1960–61	Division One	14th	Semi-final	Group stage	N/A	Unknown	Unknown
1961–62	Division One	16th	Runners-up	Group stage	N/A	Unknown	Unknown
1962–63	Division One	12th	Fourth round	Group stage	N/A	Unknown	Unknown
1963–64	Division One	12th	Third round	Group stage	Summer Cup – Group stage	Unknown	Unknown
1964–65	Division One	15th	First round	Group stage	Summer Cup – Group stage	Unknown	Unknown
1965–66	Division One	16th	First round	Group stage	N/A	Unknown	Unknown
1966–67	Division One	17th	Second round	Group stage	N/A	Unknown	Unknown
1967–68	Division Two	1st	First round	Group stage	N/A	Unknown	Unknown
1968–69	Division One	11th	Second round	Group stage	N/A	Unknown	Unknown
1969–70	Division One	15th	Second round	Group stage	N/A	Unknown	Unknown
1970–71	Division One	17th	Fourth round	Group stage	N/A	Unknown	Unknown
1971–72	Division Two	4th	Fourth round	Semi-final	N/A	Ally McLeod	24
1972–73	Division Two	5th	Third round	Group stage	Drybrough Cup; Quarter-final	Ally McLeod	23
1973–74	Division Two	11th	Third round	Second round	Drybrough Cup; Quarter-final	Bobby McKean	19
1974–75	Division Two	6th (Note: The teams placed 1st–6th were promoted to the new First Division, but it remained the second tier below the new Premier Division.)	Second round	Group stage	N/A	Donny McDowall	14
1975–76	First Division	6th	Third round	Group stage	Spring Cup; Quarter-final	Donny McDowall	12
1976–77	First Division	1st	Fourth round	Group stage	N/A	Frank McGarvey & Derek Hyslop	17
1977–78	Premier Division	8th	Third round	Quarter-final	Anglo-Scottish Cup; Runners-up	Frank McGarvey	17
1978–79	Premier Division	6th	Fourth round	Third round	Anglo-Scottish Cup; Semi-final	Frank McGarvey	13
1979–80	Premier Division	3rd	Fourth round	Third round	Anglo-Scottish Cup; Winners	Doug Somner	25
1980–81	Premier Division	4th	Third round	Third round	UEFA Cup; Second round Drybrough Cup; Runners-up	Doug Somner	14
1981–82	Premier Division	5th	Semi-final	Semi-final	N/A	Frank McAvennie	13
1982–83	Premier Division	5th	Semi-final	Quarter-final	N/A	Frank McAvennie	9
1983–84	Premier Division	6th	Semi-final	Third round	UEFA Cup; First round	Frank McDougall	13
1984–85	Premier Division	5th	Fifth round	Third round	N/A	Frank McAvennie	16
1985–86	Premier Division	7th	Fifth round	Quarter-final	UEFA Cup; Second round	Gardner Speirs	7
1986–87	Premier Division	7th	Winners	Third round	N/A	Frank McGarvey	10
1987–88	Premier Division	9th	Third round	Second round	Cup Winners' Cup; Second round	Paul Chalmers	10
1988–89	Premier Division	7th	Third round	Third round	N/A	Paul Chalmers	11
1989–90	Premier Division	9th	Fourth round	Quarter-final	N/A	Guðmundur Torfason	12
1990–91	Premier Division	10th	Fourth round	Third round	N/A	Paul Kinnaird & Kenny McDowall	4
1991–92	Premier Division	11th	Third round	Third round	N/A	Guðmundur Torfason	8
1992–93	First Division	4th	Third round	Third round	Challenge Cup; First round	Barry Lavety	18
1993–94	First Division	6th	Fourth round	Third round	Challenge Cup; Runners-up	Barry Lavety	11
1994–95	First Division	7th	Third round	Second round	Challenge Cup; First round	Barry Lavety	7
1995–96	First Division	6th	Third round	Second round	Challenge Cup; Second round	Barry Lavety	11
1996–97	First Division	4th	Third round	Third round	Challenge Cup; First round	Mark Yardley	14
1997–98	First Division	6th	Third round	Third round	Challenge Cup; First round	Junior Mendes	9
1998–99	First Division	5th	Third round	Second round	N/A (Note: The Scottish Challenge Cup was not held in the 1998–99 season.)	Mark Yardley	11
1999–2000	First Division	1st	Third round	Second round	Challenge Cup; First round	Mark Yardley	19
2000–01	SPL	12th	Third round	Semi-final	N/A	Ricky Gillies	10
2001–02	First Division	8th	Third round	Second round	Challenge Cup; First round	Brian McGinty	6
2002–03	First Division	7th	Third round	Second round	Challenge Cup; Semi-final	Martin Cameron	12
2003–04	First Division	7th	Fourth round	First round	Challenge Cup; Quarter-final	Ricky Gillies	8
2004–05	First Division	2nd	Fifth round	First round	Challenge Cup; First round	John O'Neill	7
2005–06	First Division	1st	Fifth round	Third round	Challenge Cup; Winners	John Sutton	14
2006–07	SPL	11th	Third round	Third round	N/A	John Sutton	11
2007–08	SPL	10th	Quarter-final	Second round	N/A	Billy Mehmet	6
2008–09 (Note: Last season playing home matches at St Mirren Park (Love Street) (moved January 2009).)	SPL	11th	Semi-final	Third round	N/A	Andy Dorman	10
2009–10 (Note: First full season playing home matches at St Mirren Park.)	SPL	10th	Fifth round	Runners-up	N/A	Andy Dorman	6
2010–11	SPL	11th	Quarter-final	Second round	N/A	Michael Higdon	13
2011–12	SPL	8th	Quarter-final	Quarter-final	N/A	Steven Thompson	13
2012–13	SPL	11th	Quarter-final	Winners	N/A	Steven Thompson	13
2013–14	Premiership (Note: The leagues were renamed for the 2013–14 season, but the divisions remained as before.)	8th	Fifth round	Second round	N/A	Steven Thompson	13
2014–15	Premiership	12th	Fourth round	Third round	N/A	Kenny McLean	7
2015–16	Championship	6th	Fourth round	Second round	Challenge Cup; Semi-final	Stevie Mallan	11
2016–17	Championship	7th	Quarter-final	Group stage	Challenge Cup; Runners-up	John Sutton & Stevie Mallan	7
2017–18	Championship	1st	Fourth round	Group stage	Challenge Cup; Third round	Lewis Morgan	14
2018–19	Premiership	11th (Note: Won a two-legged playoff with Dundee United to remain in the division.)	Fifth round	Second round	N/A	Simeon Jackson	6
2019–20	Premiership	9th	Quarter-final	Group stage	N/A	Jonathan Obika	8
2020–21	Premiership	7th	Semi-final	Semi Final	N/A	Jamie McGrath	10
2021–22	Premiership	9th	Quarter-final	Second Round	N/A	Eamonn Brophy & Connor Ronan	8
2022–23	Premiership	6th	Group stage	Fifth Round	N/A	Mark O'Hara	10
2023–24	Premiership	5th	Quarter-final	Fifth Round	N/A	Mikael Mandron	8
2024–25	Premiership	6th	Fifth Round	Second Round	UEFA Conference League; Third qualifying round	Toyosi Olusanya	8
2025–26	Premiership	11th	Semi-final	Winners	N/A	Miguel Freckleton , Killian Phillips & Mikael Mandron	4

== League performance summary ==
The Scottish Football League was founded in 1890 and, other than during seven years of hiatus during World War II, (Note: The incomplete 1939–40 edition has not been counted in the totals.) the national top division has been played every season since. (Note: The top tier became the Scottish Premier League in 1998, and all four divisions became the Scottish Professional Football League in 2013.) The following is a summary of St Mirren's divisional status:

- **123** total eligible seasons (including 2019–20)
- **99** seasons in top level (Note: Has existed between 1890–1939, and since 1946.)
- **24** seasons in second level (Note: Has existed between 1893–1915, 1921–1939 and since 1946.)
- **0** seasons in third level (Note: Has existed between 1923–1926, 1946–1949, and since 1976.)
- **0** seasons in fourth level (Note: Has existed since 1994.)
