= Robert Campbell =

Robert, Bobby or Bob Campbell may refer to:

== Politics ==
=== Canada ===
- Robert Campbell (Nova Scotia politician) (1718–1775), merchant and political figure in Nova Scotia
- Robert Campbell (Canadian politician) (1818–1887), Canadian lumber merchant and politician
- Robert Campbell (Alberta politician) (1871–1965), member of the Legislative Assembly of Alberta
- Robert Adam Campbell (fl. 1894–1899), lumber merchant and politician from Ontario, Canada
- Robert Campbell (Prince Edward Island politician) (1922–1992)

=== U.K. ===
- Sir Robert Campbell, 3rd Baronet (c.1575–1657), Scottish nobleman and landowner
- Robert Campbell (Scottish politician), MP for Argyllshire, 1766–1772
- Robert Campbell (MP for Weymouth and Melcombe Regis) (1813–1862), British member of parliament (MP) for Weymouth and Melcombe Regis
- Robert Campbell (MP for Helston) (died 1887), MP for Helston 1866
- Robert C. Campbell (1885-1966) WWI British Army captain, known for being released from a POW camp after requesting leave from the kaiser promising he would return. He was granted leave and later returned to prison after seeing his family, as promised.
- Robert Campbell (Northern Ireland politician), MPA for North Down, 1973–1974

=== U.S. ===
- Robert B. Campbell (fl. 1809–1862), U.S. representative from South Carolina
- Robert Campbell (New York politician) (1808–1870), American politician
- Robert Campbell (Wisconsin politician) (1841–?), member of the Wisconsin State Assembly
- Robert Alexander Campbell (1832–1926), lieutenant governor of Missouri, 1881–1885
- Robert A. Campbell (mayor) (1865–1947), mayor of Ann Arbor, Michigan 1925–1927
- Robert Campbell (California politician) (1937–2020), member of the California State Assembly
- Robert M. Campbell (1935–1988), justice of the Supreme Court of Texas

=== Elsewhere ===
- Robert Campbell (Australian politician, born 1769) (1769–1846), Australian merchant/politician from New South Wales
- Robert Campbell (Australian politician, born 1804) (1804–1859), his son, New South Wales politician
- Robert Campbell (New Zealand politician) (1843–1889), New Zealand politician

== Sports ==
=== Football and rugby ===
- Bob Campbell (Australian footballer) (1868–1946), for St. Kilda Football Club
- Robert Campbell (football manager) (fl. 1896–1905), Scottish manager of Bristol City and first Bradford City side
- Robert Campbell (footballer, born 1882) (1882–1931), with Partick Thistle, Rangers and Bradford City
- Robert Campbell (footballer, born 1883) (1883–1942), Celtic and Rangers
- Bob Campbell (soccer) (fl. 1926–1930), Scottish-American
- Bobby Campbell (footballer, born 1922) (1922–2009), with Chelsea and Reading and manager of Dumbarton and Bristol Rovers
- Bobby Campbell (footballer, born 1941) (1941–2019), Scottish footballer - Motherwell
- Bobby Campbell (English footballer) (1937–2015), with Liverpool and manager of Portsmouth, Fulham and Chelsea
- Bob Campbell (American football) (born 1947), wide receiver
- Bobby Campbell (Northern Irish footballer) (1956–2016), with Bradford City, capped twice for his country
- Bobby Campbell (Scottish footballer) (born c. 1938), Scottish footballer - St Mirren
- Robert Campbell (rugby league) (born 1971), Australian who also played internationally for Russia
- Robert Campbell (Australian footballer) (born 1982), for the Hawthorn Football Club
- Rob Campbell (footballer) (born 1961), Scottish footballer with Dumbarton and Cowdenbeath
- Robert Campbell (footballer, born 1986), Scottish footballer with East Fife F.C.
- Robbie Campbell (born 1942 or 1943), Canadian football player

=== Other sports ===
- Earl Campbell (ice hockey) or (Robert Earl Campbell (1900–1953), Canadian ice hockey player
- Robert Campbell (curler) (born 1966), Canadian curler

== Other ==
- Robert Campbell of Glenlyon (1630–1696), Scottish officer implicated in the Massacre of Glencoe
- Robert Campbell (frontiersman) (1804–1879), Irish-American frontiersman, and businessman in St. Louis, Missouri
- Robert Campbell (fur trader) (1808–1894), fur trader of the Hudson's Bay Company and explorer of the Yukon
- Robert Campbell (advocate) (1814–1868), advocate, hymn writer and translator
- Robert L. Campbell (born 1953), American psychologist
- Robert Orr Campbell (1815–1892), Madras businessman who served as a non-official member of the Madras Legislative Council
- Robert Neil Campbell (1854–1928), Scottish physician
- Robert Campbell (bishop) (1884–1977), bishop of the Episcopal Diocese of Liberia
- Robert Campbell (art gallery director) (1902–1972), Australian painter and director of state art galleries
- Robert Campbell (American artist) (1951–2004), painter, poet, and publisher
- Robert Wright Campbell (1927–2000), American screenwriter, author and actor
- Bob Campbell (photographer) (1930–2014), wildlife photographer and filmmaker
- Robert Campbell (journalist) (1937–2025), architecture journalist with the Boston Globe
- Bobbi Campbell or Robert Boyle Campbell Jr. (1952–1984), American AIDS activist
- Rob Campbell (fl. 1990s–2010s), American actor
- Robert Campbell (colonist) (1829–1884), Jamaican-born American settler in Lagos (modern-day Nigeria)
- Rob Campbell (economist) (born 1951), New Zealand economist, trade unionist, businessman, and public servant
- Robert Calder Campbell (1798–1857), British soldier and miscellaneous writer
- Robert Campbell (poker player), Australian poker player

== See also ==
- Robert A. Campbell (disambiguation)
