= 1959 Scottish Cup final =

1959 Scottish Cup Final
- Event: 1958–59 Scottish Cup
St Mirren	Aberdeen
3	1
- Date: 25 April 1959
- Venue: Hampden Park, Glasgow
- Attendance: 108,591

The 1959 Scottish Cup Final was an association football match between St Mirren F.C. and Aberdeen F.C. on 25 April 1959 at Hampden Park in Glasgow, Scotland. It was 73rd staging of the final of the Scottish Cup, Scotland's most prestigious cup competition. It was Aberdeen's fifth appearance in the final of the competition whilst St Mirren were competing for the fourth time.

== Route to the final ==
Round	Opposition	Score
First round	East Fife	2–1
Second round	Arbroath	3–0
Third round	St Johnstone	2–1
Quarter-final	Kilmarnock	3–1
Semi-final	Third Lanark	1–1
Semi-final replay	Third Lanark	1–0

=== Aberdeen ===
Aberdeen entered the competition in the first round. They began their campaign against Second Division side East Fife at Pittodrie Stadium. The match ended in a 2−1 win for Aberdeen. In the second round Aberdeen faced another Second Division club, Arbroath, also at home with Aberdeen winning 3−0. In the quarter-final the club was drawn against St Johnstone of Perth who also competed in the Second Division. Aberdeen won 2−1 away at Muirton Park to progress to the quarter-final stage. The opposition was Kilmarnock who were beaten 3−1. In the semi-finals Aberdeen faced Third Lanark at the neutral venue of Ibrox Park in Glasgow which resulted in a 1−1 draw. It took a 1−0 win in a replay for Aberdeen to progress to the final for the fifth time in the club's history.

=== St Mirren ===
Round	Opposition	Score
Second round	Peebles Rovers	10–0
Third round	Motherwell	3–2
Quarter-final	Dunfermline Athletic	2–1
Semi-final	Celtic	4–0

St Mirren entered the competition in the second round. They began their campaign against non-league club Peebles Rovers which resulted in a 10−0 thrashing by the Paisley club. St Mirren then faced Motherwell of the First Division with St Mirren winning 3−2. The club then faced fellow First Division club Dunfermline Athletic at home in the quarter-final, producing a 2−1 win to progress to the semi-final stage. Celtic were the opposition faced in the semi-final with St Mirren winning 4−0 at Hampden Park to reach the Scottish Cup Final for a fourth time.

== Match details ==
25 April 1959
15:00

St Mirren	3 − 1	Aberdeen
Bryceland 43'; Miller 65'; Baker 76'		Baird 89'

Hampden Park, Glasgow
Attendance: 108,591
Referee: Jack Mowat

=== Teams ===
St Mirren:
GK	(Scotland) Dave Walker
RB	(Scotland) David Lapsley (c)
LB	(Scotland) John Wilson
RH	(Scotland) Jackie Neilson
CH	(Scotland) Jackie McGugan
LH	(Scotland) Tommy Leishman
RW	(Scotland) Jim Rodger
IR	(Scotland) Tommy Bryceland
CF	(United States) Gerry Baker
IL	(Scotland) Tommy Gemmell
LW	(Scotland) Ally Miller
Manager:
(Scotland) Willie Reid

ABERDEEN:
GK	(Scotland) Fred Martin
RB	(Scotland) Dave Caldwell
LB	(Scotland) Jimmy Hogg
RH	(Scotland) Ken Brownlee
CH	(Scotland) Jim Clunie (c)
LH	(Scotland) Archie Glen
RW	(Scotland) Dickie Ewen
IR	(Scotland) Norrie Davidson
CF	(Scotland) Hugh Baird
IL	(Scotland) Bobby Wishart
LW	(England) Jack Hather
Manager:
(Scotland) Davie Shaw
