= 2000–01 St Mirren F.C. season =

St Mirren
- Scottish Premier League: 12th
- Scottish Cup: Third round
- Scottish League Cup: Semi-final
Home colours

The 2000–01 season saw St Mirren compete in the Scottish Premier League where they finished in 12th position with 30 points, suffering relegation.

== Final league table ==
Pos	Team	Pld	W	D	L	GF	GA	GD	Pts	Qualification or relegation (Note: Teams played each other three times (33 matches), before the league split into two groups (the top six and the bottom six) for the last five matches.)
8	Motherwell	38	12	7	19	42	56	−14	43	
9	Dunfermline Athletic	38	11	9	18	34	54	−20	42	
10	St Johnstone	38	9	13	16	40	56	−16	40	
11	Dundee United	38	9	8	21	38	63	−25	35	
12	St Mirren (R)	38	8	6	24	32	72	−40	30	Relegation to the First Division

Source: Scottish Professional Football League
Rules for classification: 1) Points; 2) Goal difference; 3) Goals scored
(R) Relegated

== Results ==
St Mirren's score comes first

=== Legend ===
Win	Draw	Loss

=== Scottish Premier League ===
Match	Date	Opponent	Venue	Result	Attendance	Scorers
1	29 July 2000	Kilmarnock	H	0–1	7,388	
2	5 August 2000	Aberdeen	A	1–2	11,997	Gillies 38'
3	13 August 2000	Rangers	H	1–3	8,851	Paeslack 62'
4	19 August 2000	Dundee	H	2–1	5,165	Gillies 69', McGarry 82'
5	26 August 2000	Hibernian	A	0–2	11,806	
6	9 September 2000	Motherwell	H	0–1	5,274	
7	16 September 2000	Dundee United	A	0–0	5,943	
8	20 September 2000	Heart of Midlothian	A	0–2	10,524	
9	23 September 2000	St Johnstone	H	0–1	4,519	
10	30 September 2000	Dundee United	H	2–1	5,002	McGowan 21', Yardley 32'
12	14 October 2000	Celtic	A	0–2	60,002	
13	21 October 2000	Kilmarnock	A	1–2	7,861	Yardley 29'
14	28 October 2000	Aberdeen	H	2–0	5,763	Walker 24', Gillies 53'
15	4 November 2000	Rangers	A	1–7	48,795	Gillies 44'
16	11 November 2000	Heart of Midlothian	H	1–2	5,328	Gillies 89'
17	18 November 2000	Dundee	A	0–5	6,333	
18	25 November 2000	Hibernian	H	1–1	5,255	McGarry 89'
19	29 November 2000	Motherwell	A	0–2	5,312	
20	5 December 2000	Dundee United	H	1–1	4,985	Renfurm 71'
21	9 December 2000	St Johnstone	A	0–2	4,434	
22	16 December 2000	Dunfermline Athletic	A	0–2	5,061	
23	23 December 2000	Celtic	H	0–2	9,487	
24	26 December 2000	Kilmarnock	H	1–3	5,649	Fenton 14'
25	2 January 2001	Rangers	H	1–3	8,142	Gillies 37'
26	31 January 2001	Heart of Midlothian	A	0–1	10,164	
27	3 February 2001	Dundee	H	2–1	4,197	Rudden 40', Dagnogo 84'
28	10 February 2001	Hibernian	A	2–4	8,872	Gillies 44', 54'
28	21 February 2001	Aberdeen	A	0–3	9,946	
29	24 February 2001	Motherwell	H	0–1	4,034	
30	3 March 2001	Dundee United	A	0–4	8,334	
31	17 March 2001	St Johnstone	H	1–0	4,565	McGarry 28'
32	31 March 2001	Dunfermline Athletic	H	1–1	5,371	McGowan 81'
33	7 April 2001	Celtic	A	0–1	60,440	McGowan 81'
34	23 April 2001	Dundee United	H	2–1	6,473	Gillies 70', 90'
35	28 April 2001	Dunfermline Athletic	A	2–1	5,058	McGowan 31', Yardley 41'
36	5 May 2001	St Johnstone	A	2–2	4,199	Dods 13', Yardley 22'
37	12 May 2001	Aberdeen	H	2–1	5,708	Walker 42', McGarry 45'
38	20 May 2001	Motherwell	A	3–3	4,158	Quitongo 32', 57', Fenton 49'

=== Scottish Cup ===
Match	Date	Opponent	Venue	Result	Attendance	Scorers
R3	27 January 2001	Motherwell	H	1–2	5,002	Quitongo 89'

=== Scottish League Cup ===
Match	Date	Opponent	Venue	Result	Attendance	Scorers
R2	22 August 2000	Ross County	A	3–1	957	Murray 84', Walker 93', Brown 112'
R3	5 September 2000	Dundee	H	3–0	3,988	Walker 46', Brown 61', Paeslack 87'
QF	31 October 2000	Dunfermline Athletic	H	2–1	4,095	McGarry 25', Gillies 42'
SF	6 February 2001	Kilmarnock	N	0–3	9,213	
