= 1955 Scottish League Cup final =

- Event: 1955–56 Scottish League Cup
Aberdeen	St Mirren
2	1
- Date: 22 October 1955
- Venue: Hampden Park, Glasgow
- Attendance: 44,106

The 1955 Scottish League Cup final was played on 22 October 1955, at Hampden Park in Glasgow and was the final of the 10th Scottish League Cup competition. The final was contested by Aberdeen and St Mirren. Aberdeen won the match 2–1, thanks to a goal by Graham Leggat and an own goal by Jim Mallan. The winning goal, scored 11 minutes from the end, was a wind-assisted cross. The match proved to be St Mirren's last appearance in a Scottish League Cup final until 2010.

== Match details ==
22 October 1955

Aberdeen	2–1	St Mirren
Mallan (o.g.); Leggat		Holmes

Hampden Park, Glasgow
Attendance: 44,106
Referee: H. Phillips

ABERDEEN :
GK	Fred Martin
FB	Jimmy Mitchell (c)
FB	Dave Caldwell
RH	Bob Wilson
CH	Jim Clunie
LH	Archie Glen
RW	Graham Leggat
IF	Harry Yorston
CF	Paddy Buckley
IF	Bobby Wishart
LW	Jack Hather
Manager:
Davie Shaw

ST. MIRREN :
GK	Jim Lornie
FB	David Lapsley
FB	Jim Mallan
RH	Jackie Neilson
CH	Willie Telfer (c)
LH	Bobby Holmes
RW	Jim Rodger
IF	Davie Laird
CF	Jackie Brown
IF	Tommy Gemmell
LW	Brian Callan
Manager:
Willie Reid
