= Mallan =

Mallan is a surname and a given name. Notable people with the name include:

Surname:

- Jim Mallan (1924–1969), Scottish footballer
- Lloyd Mallan (1914–1973), 20th-century American science writer
- Stevie Mallan (footballer, born 1967) (born 1967), Scottish footballer
- Stevie Mallan (footballer, born 1996) (born 1996), Scottish footballer

Given name:

- Sean Mallan McInerney (born 1960), American football defensive end
- Mallan Roberts (born 1992), Canadian professional soccer player
- Daouda Mallan Wanke (1946–2004), military and political leader in Niger

== See also ==
- Mallan, New South Wales, locality in the Murray River Council, New South Wales, Australia
