= 1999–2000 Livingston F.C. season =

Livingston
1999–00 season
- Manager: Ray Stewart (until 15 March); Jim Leishman
- Stadium: Almondvale Stadium
- Scottish First Division: Fourth place
- Scottish Cup: Fourth round
- League Cup: Second round
- Challenge Cup: Semi-final
- Top goalscorer: League: David Bingham & Brian McPhee (15); All: David Bingham (19)
Home colours	Away colours

Season 1999-00 saw Livingston compete in the Scottish First Division. They also competed in the Challenge Cup, League Cup and the Scottish Cup.

== Summary ==
Season 1999–00 was Livingston's first season in the Scottish First Division having been promoted the previous season they finished fourth in the league. They reached the semi-final of the challenge cup, were knocked out of the League Cup in the second round and the Scottish Cup in the fourth round.

=== Management ===
Livingston started the season under Ray Stewart and on 15 March 2000 he was sacked by the club with Jim Leishman being re-appointed as manager.

== Results & fixtures ==
Win Draw Loss

=== Scottish First Division ===
7 August 1999 1	Livingston	1 – 1	Raith Rovers	Almondvale Stadium
	Keith 25'		Tosh 55'	Referee: Douglas McDonald

14 August 1999 2	Ayr United	1 – 2	Livingston	Somerset Park
	Hurst (red card) 34'; Lennon 70'		Britton 45'; Bingham 74'

21 August 1999 3	Livingston	3 – 0	Airdrieonians	Almondvale Stadium
	McPhee 62', 65'; Sweeney 75'			Referee: Willie Young

28 August 1999 4	Greenock Morton	2 – 2	Livingston	Cappielow
	Murie 39'; Connolly 67'		Keith 11'; Millar 29'	Referee: Steve Kaney

4 September 1999 5	Livingston	0 – 1	Dunfermline Athletic	Almondvale Stadium
	Coughlan (red card) 69'		Petrie (red card) 72'; Coyle 84'	Referee: Jim Herald

11 September 1999 6	Falkirk	0 – 2	Livingston	Brockville Park
			Robertson 44'; Bingham 67'	Referee: John Fleming

18 September 1999 7	Livingston	2 – 2	Inverness Caledonian Thistle	Almondvale Stadium
	MacPhee 28', 67'		Bavidge 35'; Sheerin 39 pen.'	Referee: Brian Cassidy

25 September 1999 8	Livingston	2 – 1	Clydebank	Almondvale Stadium
	Bingham 7', 9'		Gardner 67 pen.'	Referee: Kenny Clark

2 October 1999 9	St Mirren	1 – 1	Livingston	Love Street
	McLaughlin 51'		Britton 17'; McManus (red card) 64'	Referee: Kevin Toner

16 October 1999 10	Livingston	4 – 1	Ayr United	Almondvale Stadium
	Britton 10'; McCormick 55', 68'; McKinnon 75'		Craig 33'

23 October 1999 11	Raith Rovers	3 – 1	Livingston	Stark's Park
	Browne 22'; Black 34 pen.' Shields 75'		Millar 26 pen.' McCaldon (red card) 31'	Referee: George Clyde

30 October 1999 12	Livingston	1 – 1	Falkirk	Almondvale Stadium
	Millar 68'		Morris 69'	Referee: Eric Martindale

6 November 1999 13	Inverness Caledonian Thistle	2 – 0	Livingston	Caledonian Stadium
	Golabek 75'; McLean 90'			Referee: George Simpson

14 November 1999 14	Dunfermline Athletic	3 – 0	Livingston	East End Park
	Crawford 35 pen.', 84'; Moss 43'		Sweeney (red card) 34'	Referee: Brian McGarry

20 November 1999 15	Livingston	2 – 1	Greenock Morton	Almondvale Stadium
	Britton 49'; Bingham 58'		Murie 76'

27 November 1999 16	Livingston	1 – 2	St Mirren	Almondvale Stadium
	Turner 78 o.g.'		McGarry 12'; McLaughlin 75'	Referee: Hugh Dallas

4 December 1999 17	Clydebank	1 – 5	Livingston	Cappielow
	Gardner 86 pen.'		Bingham 12', 90'; McCormick 41'; King 50'; Fleming 74'	Referee: Kevin Toner

14 December 1999 18	Airdrieonians	2 – 3	Livingston	Excelsior Stadium
	McGuire 15'; McCormick 84'		McCormick 34'; Bingham 60', 88'	Referee: Tom Brown

27 December 1999 19	Falkirk	2 – 3	Livingston	Brockville Park
	Nicholls 34', 73'; Sinclair (red card) 45'		McKenzie 47 o.g.' McPhee 65', 86'	Referee: Martin Clark

3 January 2000 20	Livingston	1 – 1	Inverness Caledonian Thistle	Almondvale Stadium
	McPhee 82'		Wilson 73'; Xausa (red card) 87'

8 January 2000 21	Livingston	1 – 0	Dunfermline Athletic	Almondvale Stadium
	Bingham 61'			Referee: Bobby Orr

22 January 2000 22	Livingston	3 – 0	Clydebank	Almondvale Stadium
	Keith 65', 73'; McPhee 84'

5 February 2000 23	St Mirren	0 – 2	Livingston	Love Street
	Brown (red card) 42'		Bingham 28'; McPhee 52'	Referee: Tom Brown

29 February 2000 24	Ayr United	0 – 1	Livingston	Somerset Park
			Craig 64'	Referee: Eric Martindale

4 March 2000 25	Livingston	0 – 1	Falkirk	Almondvale Stadium
			Nicholls 43'	Referee: Kevin Toner

11 March 2000 26	Livingston	0 – 0	Raith Rovers	Almondvale Stadium

14 March 2000 27	Greenock Morton	1 – 0	Livingston	Cappielow
	Curran 73'			Referee: Eric Martindale

18 March 2000 28	Inverness Caledonian Thistle	4 – 1	Livingston	Caledonian Stadium
	Xausa 11', 58', 85'; Wyness 32'		McPhee 59'; Coughlan (red card) 80'	Referee: Jim Herald

25 March 2000 29	Livingston	1 – 0	Greenock Morton	Almondvale Stadium
	McCormick 82'			Referee: George Clyde

1 April 2000 30	Dunfermline Athletic	4 – 1	Livingston	East End Park
	Coyle 16'; May 44'; Crawford 58'; Bullen 73'		May 52 o.g.'

4 April 2000 31	Livingston	3 – 2	Airdrieonians	Almondvale Stadium
	Smith 11'; McKinnon 23'; McPhee 25'		Easton 46'; Neil 79'; Forrest (red card) 80'; Jack (red card) 82'	Referee: George Simpson

8 April 2000 32	Clydebank	1 – 2	Livingston	Cappielow
	Cameron 90'		Bingham 35'; Rowson 62'	Referee: Alan Gemmill

15 April 2000 33	Livingston	1 – 2	St Mirren	Almondvale Stadium
	Bingham 61'		McGarry 23'; Yardley 76'

22 April 2000 34	Raith Rovers	1 – 3	Livingston	Stark's Park
	Owusu 23'		McPhee 60', 88'; Britton 87'

29 April 2000 35	Livingston	3 – 1	Ayr United	Almondvale Stadium
	Bingham 49 pen.' McCormick 73'; McPhee 80'		Kean 88'	Referee: George Simpson

6 May 2000 36	Airdrieonians	0 – 2	Livingston	Excelsior Stadium
			Bingham 52'; McPhee 90'	Referee: Bobby Orr

=== Scottish League Cup ===
31 July 1999 First round	Cowdenbeath	0 – 2	Livingston	Central Park
15:00			Britton 17', 24'	Referee: John Unerhill

17 August 1999 Second round	Aberdeen	0 – 1	Livingston	Pittodrie Stadium
19:45	Gillies 59'	Report		Attendance: 6,756; Referee: John Rowbotham

=== Scottish Challenge Cup ===
24 August 1999 Second round	Livingston	2 – 1 (a.e.t.)	Berwick Rangers	Almondvale Stadium
19:30	Bingham 69', 105'		Patterson 37'	Referee: Jim McCluskey

14 September 1999 Quarter-final	Livingston	3 – 1	Raith Rovers	Almondvale Stadium
19:30	McPhee 1'; Britton 30'; Millar 89'		McManus 32' (o.g.)

28 September 1999 Semi-final	Inverness Caledonian Thistle	1 – 0	Livingston	Caledonian Stadium
19:30	Sheerin 88'			Attendance: 1,025

=== Scottish Cup ===
29 January 2000 Third round	Queen of the South	0 – 7	Livingston	Palmerston Park
15:00	Leslie (red card) 23'	BBC Report	McKinnon 14', 89'; Keith 51', 58', 63'; Bingham 59'; McPhee 68'	Referee: Hugh Dallas

19 February 2000 Fourth round	Partick Thistle	2 – 1	Livingston	Firhill Stadium
15:00	Craig 40'; McLean 79'		Bingham 9'; Millar (red card) 74'	Referee: George Simpson

== Statistics ==
=== League table ===
Pos	Team	Pld	W	D	L	GF	GA	GD	Pts	Promotion or relegation
2	Dunfermline Athletic (P)	36	20	11	5	66	33	+33	71	Promotion to the Premier League
3	Falkirk	36	20	8	8	67	40	+27	68	
4	Livingston	36	19	7	10	60	45	+15	64	
5	Raith Rovers	36	17	8	11	55	40	+15	59	
6	Inverness CT	36	13	10	13	60	55	+5	49	

Source: "1999-2000 First Division - SPFL Archive". SPFL.
Rules for classification: 1) points; 2) goal difference; 3) number of goals scored.
(P) Promoted
