= Stevie Mallan =

Stevie Mallan may refer to:

- Stevie Mallan (footballer, born 1967), Scottish striker
- Stevie Mallan (footballer, born 1996), Scottish midfielder
