= 1958–59 Heart of Midlothian F.C. season =

Heart of Midlothian
1958–59 season
- Manager: Tommy Walker
- Stadium: Tynecastle Park
- Scottish First Division: 1st
- Scottish Cup: Round 2
- League Cup: Winners
- European Cup: Preliminary Round

During the 1958–59 season Hearts competed in the Scottish First Division, the Scottish Cup, the European Cup, the Scottish League Cup and the East of Scotland Shield.

== Fixtures ==
=== Friendlies ===
13 October 1958 Friendly	Blackpool	2–1	Hearts	Bloomfield Road
	Goal

30 October 1958 Friendly	Hearts	3–3	South Africa XI	Tynecastle Park
	Goal

3 November 1958 Friendly	Hearts	0–2	Djurgårdens IF	Tynecastle Park
	Goal

19 November 1958 Friendly	Aston Villa	3–3	Hearts	Villa Park
	Goal

28 February 1959 Friendly	Ipswich Town	1–0	Hearts	Portman Road
	Goal

4 April 1959 Friendly	Inverness Select	2–7	Hearts	Inverness
	Goal

9 May 1959 Tour	Australia	1–7	Hearts	Sydney Sports Ground, Sydney
	Goal			Attendance: 16,212

10 May 1959 Tour	New South Wales	1–6	Hearts	Wallsend, Newcastle
	Goal

12 May 1959 Tour	Queensland	3–3	Hearts	Exhibition Ground, Brisbane
	Goal

16 May 1959 Tour	Australia	1–7	Hearts	The Gabba, Brisbane
	Goal

20 May 1959 Tour	Northern Districts	2–8	Hearts	Wallsend, Newcastle
	Goal

23 May 1959 Tour	Australia	2–8	Hearts	Sydney Sports Ground, Sydney
	Goal

24 May 1959 Tour	South Coast	0–7	Hearts	Wollongong Showground, Wollongong
	Goal

30 May 1959 Tour	Australia	1–9	Hearts	Olympic Park, Melbourne
	Goal

31 May 1959 Tour	Victoria	0–5	Hearts	Olympic Park, Melbourne
	Goal

3 June 1959 Tour	Tasmania	0–10	Hearts	North Hobart Ground, Hobart
	Goal

6 June 1959 Tour	Australia	0–6	Hearts	Adelaide Oval, Adelaide
	Goal

7 June 1959 Tour	Victoria	1–7	Hearts	Olympic Park, Melbourne
	Goal

10 June 1959 Tour	South Australia	0–8	Hearts	Norwood Oval, Adelaide
	Goal

13 June 1959 Tour	Australia	0–9	Hearts	WACA Ground, Perth
	Goal

15 June 1959 Tour	West Australia	1–10	Hearts	WACA Ground, Perth
	Goal

=== East of Scotland Shield ===
24 November 1958 Final	Hearts	3–0	Hibernian	Tynecastle Park
				Attendance: 12,000

24 April 1959 Final	Hibernian	0–2	Hearts	Easter Road
				Attendance: 10,000

=== European Cup ===
3 September 1958 European Cup Preliminary round 1st Leg	Standard Liège	5–1	Hearts	Stade Maurice Dufrasne
			Goal	Attendance: 25,000

9 September 1958 European Cup Preliminary round 2nd Leg	Hearts	2–1	Standard Liège	Tynecastle Park
			Goal	Attendance: 37,500

=== League Cup ===
9 August 1958 League Cup Group	Rangers	3–0	Hearts	Ibrox Park
				Attendance: 63,000

13 August 1958 League Cup Group	Hearts	3–0	Third Lanark	Tynecastle Park
				Attendance: 18,000

16 August 1958 League Cup Group	Raith Rovers	1–3	Hearts	Stark's Park
				Attendance: 18,000

23 August 1958 League Cup Group	Hearts	2–1	Rangers	Tynecastle Park
				Attendance: 42,000

27 August 1958 League Cup Group	Third Lanark	4–5	Hearts	Pittodrie Park
				Attendance: 15,000

30 August 1958 League Cup Group	Hearts	3–1	Raith Rovers	Tynecastle Park
				Attendance: 16,000

9 September 1958 League Cup Quarter-Final 1st Leg	Ayr United	1–5	Hearts	Somerset Park
				Attendance: 14,000

17 September 1959 League Cup Quarter-Final 2nd Leg	Hearts	3–1	Ayr United	Tynecastle Park
				Attendance: 17,000

1 October 1958 League Cup Semi-Final	Kilmarnock	0–3	Hearts	Easter Road
				Attendance: 41,527

25 October 1958 League Cup Final	Hearts	5–1	Partick Thistle	Hampden Park
				Attendance: 59,960

=== Scottish Cup ===
4 February 1959 Scottish Cup R1	Queen of the South	1–3	Hearts	Palmerston Park
				Attendance: 9,862

14 February 1959 Scottish Cup R2	Rangers	3–2	Hearts	Ibrox Park
				Attendance: 53,000

=== Scottish First Division ===
20 August 1959 Scottish First Division	Hearts	6–2	Dunfermline Athletic	Tynecastle Park
				Attendance: 20,000

6 September 1958 Scottish First Division	Hibernian	0–4	Hearts	Easter Road
				Attendance: 29,500

13 September 1958 Scottish First Division	Hearts	4–3	Airdireonians	Tynecastle Park
				Attendance: 22,000

20 September 1958 Scottish First Division	St Mirren	1–1	Hearts	St Mirren Park, Love Street
				Attendance: 16,000

27 September 1958 Scottish First Division	Hearts	8–3	Third Lanark	Tynecastle Park
				Attendance: 20,000

4 October 1958 Scottish First Division	Stirling Albion	1–2	Hearts	Annfield Stadium
				Attendance: 12,000

11 October 1958 Scottish First Division	Dundee	3–3	Hearts	Dens Park
				Attendance: 18,000

18 October 1958 Scottish First Division	Hearts	2–0	Patick Thistle	Tynecastle Park
				Attendance: 20,000

29 October 1958 Scottish First Division	Raith Rovers	0–5	Hearts	Tynecastle Park
				Attendance: 6,000

1 November 1958 Scottish First Division	Hearts	0–2	Motherwell	Tynecastle Park
				Attendance: 30,000

8 November 1958 Scottish First Division	Queen of the South	0–5	Hearts	Palmerston Park
				Attendance: 9,000

15 November 1958 Scottish First Division	Hearts	2–2	Clyde	Tynecastle Park
				Attendance: 22,000

22 November 1958 Scottish First Division	Hearts	5–1	Falkirk	Tynecastle Park
				Attendance: 20,000

29 November 1958 Scottish First Division	Kilmarnock	3–2	Hearts	Rugby Park
				Attendance: 15,269

6 December 1958 Scottish First Division	Hearts	5–1	Aberdeen	Tynecastle Park
				Attendance: 22,000

13 December 1958 Scottish First Division	Rangers	5–0	Hearts	Ibrox Park
				Attendance: 66,000

20 December 1958 Scottish First Division	Hearts	1–1	Celtic	Tynecastle Park
				Attendance: 30,000

27 December 1958 Scottish First Division	Dunfermline Athletic	3–3	Hearts	East End Park
				Attendance: 12,000

1 January 1959 Scottish First Division	Hearts	1–3	Hibernian	Tynecastle Park
				Attendance: 35,000

3 January 1959 Scottish First Division	Airdrieonians	2–3	Hearts	Broomfield Park
				Attendance: 14,900

24 January 1959 Scottish First Division	Hearts	1–4	Stirling Albion	Tynecastle Park
				Attendance: 22,000

7 February 1959 Scottish First Division	Hearts	1–0	Dundee	Tynecastle Park
				Attendance: 18,000

18 February 1959 Scottish First Division	Partick Thistle	2–1	Hearts	Firhill Park
				Attendance: 12,000

21 February 1959 Scottish First Division	Hearts	2–1	Motherwell	Tynecastle Park
				Attendance: 12,000

25 February 1959 Scottish First Division	Third Lanark	0–4	Hearts	Cathkin Park
				Attendance: 3,500

4 March 1959 Scottish First Division	Motherwell	0–1	Hearts	Fir Park
				Attendance: 14,000

7 March 1959 Scottish First Division	Hearts	2–1	Queen of the South	Tynecastle Park
				Attendance: 45,000

9 March 1959 Scottish First Division	Hearts	4–0	St Mirren	Tynecastle Park
				Attendance: 12,000

14 March 1959 Scottish First Division	Clyde	2–2	Hearts	Shawfield Stadium
				Attendance: 9,500

21 March 1959 Scottish First Division	Falkirk	0–2	Hearts	Brockville Park
				Attendance: 19,000

28 March 1959 Scottish First Division	Hearts	3–1	Kilmarnock	Tynecastle Park
				Attendance: 18,000

11 April 1959 Scottish First Division	Hearts	2–0	Rangers	Tynecastle Park
				Attendance: 30,000

15 April 1959 Scottish First Division	Aberdeen	2–4	Hearts	Pittodrie Park
				Attendance: 14,736

18 April 1959 Scottish First Division	Celtic	2–1	Hearts	Celtic Park
				Attendance: 19,500

== See also ==
- List of Heart of Midlothian F.C. seasons
