= Bobby Campbell (footballer, born 1941) =

Scottish footballer (1941–2019)

Personal information
- Full name: Robert McGhee Campbell
- Date of birth: 13 August 1941
- Place of birth: Ayr, Scotland
- Date of death: 7 March 2019 (aged 77)
- Place of death: Irvine, Scotland
- Position: Inside right

Senior career*
| Years | Team | Apps | (Gls) |
- Ardeer Recreation
| 1959–1963 | St Mirren | 19 | (1) |
| 1963–1965 | Greenock Morton | | |
| 1965–1971 | Motherwell | 161 | (36) |
| 1971–1972 | Stranraer | 6 | (0) |
- * Club domestic league appearances and goals

Robert McGhee Campbell (13 August 1941 – 7 March 2019) was a Scottish footballer who played as an inside right for St Mirren, Greenock Morton, Motherwell and Stranraer.

Campbell joined St Mirren from Ayrshire Junior football as a teenager in 1959, at which time he was also studying for a degree in science at the University of Glasgow. There was another player of the same name, a right back, on the books of the Paisley club's from 1959, and as a consequence they became known in match reports as 'Black' Campbell and 'Red' Campbell to differentiate ('Red' was the right-back, who had ginger hair – the forward has been reported as having very dark hair, but in fact it was a light brown shade). 'Black' Bobby Campbell stated that in training, he was referred to as "Boaby", a more common pronunciation in his native Ayrshire, while the Glaswegian 'Red' was simply "Bobby".

The name issue seemed to have passed when 'Black' Campbell moved on to Morton in 1963 (he was allowed to leave St Mirren despite the earlier departure of the players who had kept him out of the team, Tommy Gemmell and Tommy Bryceland); he soon became an important part of the Morton team and helped them reach the 1963 Scottish League Cup Final, although they lost the match to Rangers. 'Red' Campbell later made the same move to Cappielow, and both stayed at the club until 1965, with 'Black' transferring to Motherwell ('Red' moved to play in South Africa).

Campbell spent six years at Fir Park featuring in several different positions, with possibly his most memorable contribution being the scorer of all five goals in a victory over his old club St Mirren in September 1966, finishing that campaign as the club's leading scorer. He ended his career after a short spell with Stranraer, and later worked for IBM. He died in 2019.

== Honours ==
Morton

- Scottish Football League Division Two: 1963–64

Motherwell

- Scottish Football League Division Two: 1968–69
