= McGugan =

McGugan is a surname. Notable people with the surname include:

- Irene McGugan (born 1952), Scottish politician
- Jackie McGugan (1939–2015), Scottish footballer
- Lewis McGugan (born 1988), English footballer
- Malcolm McGugan (1846–1937), Canadian politician
- Paul McGugan (born 1964), Scottish footballer
- Stuart McGugan (born 1944), Scottish actor
