= Bobby Campbell (Scottish footballer) =

Scottish footballer (born c. 1939)

Personal information
- Full name: Robert Campbell
- Date of birth: c. 1939 (age 86–87)
- Place of birth: Glasgow, Scotland
- Position: Right back

Youth career
- Drumchapel Amateurs

Senior career*
Years	Team	Apps	(Gls)
1958–1965	St Mirren	118	(4)
1965–1966	Greenock Morton	17	(5)
–	Durban City		
- * Club domestic league appearances and goals

Robert Campbell (born c. 1939) was a Scottish footballer who played as a right back, primarily with St Mirren. He appeared in the 1962 Scottish Cup Final which Saints lost to Rangers, having fallen at the semi-final stage to Dunfermline Athletic the previous season after a replay. Campbell was at the Paisley club when they won the same trophy in 1959, but the long-serving David Lapsley was still occupying the position at that point).

There was another player of the same name, a forward, on St Mirren's books from 1959, and as a consequence they became known in match reports as 'Black' Campbell and 'Red' Campbell to differentiate ('Red' was the right-back, who had ginger hair – the forward has been reported as having very dark hair, but in fact it was a light brown shade). 'Black' Bobby Campbell stated that in training, he was referred to as "Boaby", a more common pronunciation in his native Ayrshire, while the Glaswegian 'Red' was simply "Bobby". The name issue seemed to resolved itself when 'Black' moved on to Greenock Morton in 1963, but two years later 'Red' made the same move. Both stayed at the club until 1966, with 'Red' Campbell then moving to play for Durban City in South Africa ('Black' went to Motherwell).
