= Robert A. Campbell =

Robert A. Campbell may refer to:

- Robert Alexander Campbell (1832–1926), lieutenant governor of Missouri 1881–1885
- Robert Adam Campbell, member of the Legislative Assembly of Ontario, 1894–1899
- Robert A. Campbell (mayor) (1865–1947), mayor of Ann Arbor, Michigan 1925–1927

== See also ==
- Robert Campbell (disambiguation)
