= 1958–59 Scottish Cup =

Tournament details
- Country: Scotland

Final positions
- Champions: St Mirren
- Runners-up: Aberdeen

The 1958–59 Scottish Cup was the 74th staging of Scotland's most prestigious football knockout competition.

The Cup was won by St Mirren who defeated Aberdeen in the final.

== First round ==
Home team	Score	Away team
Aberdeen	2 – 1	East Fife
Babcock & Wilcox	4 – 0	Forres Mechanics
Celtic	4 – 0	Albion Rovers
Cowdenbeath	2 – 2	Dunfermline Athletic
Dumbarton	4 – 0	Buckie Thistle
East Stirlingshire	1 – 1	Dundee United
Forfar Athletic	1 – 3	Rangers
Fraserburgh	1 – 0	Dundee
Peebles Rovers	2 – 0	Ross County
Queen of the South	1 – 3	Hearts
Raith Rovers	1 – 1	Hibernian
Stenhousemuir	5 – 2	Eyemouth United
Stranraer	3 – 2	Berwick Rangers

=== Replays ===
Home team	Score	Away team
Dundee United	0 – 0	East Stirlingshire
Dunfermline Athletic	4 – 1	Cowdenbeath
Hibernian	2 – 1	Raith Rovers

==== Second Replays ====
Home team	Score	Away team
Dundee United	4 – 0	East Stirlingshire

== Second round ==
Home team	Score	Away team
Celtic	1 – 1	Clyde
Aberdeen	3 – 0	Arbroath
Airdrieonians	2 – 7	Motherwell
Ayr United	3 – 0	Stranraer
Babcock & Wilcox	0 – 5	Greenock Morton
Brechin City	3 – 3	Alloa Athletic
Coldstream	0 – 4	Hamilton Academical
Dumbarton	2 – 8	Kilmarnock
Dundee United	0 – 4	Third Lanark
Fraserburgh	3 – 4	Stirling Albion
Hibernian	3 – 1	Falkirk
Montrose	0 – 1	Dunfermline Athletic
Rangers	3 – 2	Hearts
St Johnstone	3 – 1	Queen's Park
Stenhousemuir	1 – 3	Partick Thistle
St Mirren	10-0	Peebles Rovers

=== Replays ===
Home team	Score	Away team
Clyde	3 – 4	Celtic
Alloa Athletic	3 – 1	Brechin City

== Third round ==
Home team	Score	Away team
Celtic	2 – 1	Rangers
Dunfermline Athletic	2 – 1	Ayr United
Hamilton Academical	0 – 5	Kilmarnock
Hibernian	4 – 1	Partick Thistle
St Johnstone	1 – 2	Aberdeen
St Mirren	3 – 2	Motherwell
Stirling Albion	3 – 1	Greenock Morton
Third Lanark	3 – 2	Alloa Athletic

== Quarter-finals ==
Home team	Score	Away team
Aberdeen	3 – 1	Kilmarnock
St Mirren	2 – 1	Dunfermline Athletic
Stirling Albion	1 – 3	Celtic
Third Lanark	2 – 1	Hibernian

== Semi-finals ==
4 April 1959

Aberdeen	1–1	Third Lanark
Norrie Davidson 15'		Tom Dick 2'

Ibrox Stadium, Glasgow
Attendance: 33,744
Referee: Willie Brittle

4 April 1959

St Mirren	4–0	Celtic

Hampden Park, Glasgow
Attendance: 73,855

=== Replays ===
8 April 1959

Aberdeen	1–0	Third Lanark
Norrie Davidson 35'

Ibrox Stadium, Glasgow
Attendance: 16,000
Referee: Willie Brittle

== Final ==
25 April 1959

St Mirren	3–1	Aberdeen
Bryceland 43'; Miller 65'; Baker 76'		Baird 89'

Hampden Park, Glasgow
Attendance: 108,591
Referee: Jack Mowat

== See also ==
- 1958–59 in Scottish football
- 1958–59 Scottish League Cup
