= 1955–56 Scottish League Cup =

Tournament details
- Country: Scotland

Final positions
- Champions: Aberdeen
- Runners-up: St Mirren

The 1955–56 Scottish League Cup was the tenth season of Scotland's second football knockout competition. The competition was won Aberdeen, who defeated St Mirren in the Final.

== First round ==
=== Group 1 ===
Team	Pld	W	D	L	GF	GA	GR	Pts
St Mirren	6	3	1	2	10	9	1.111	7
Kilmarnock	6	2	3	1	7	7	1.000	7
Dundee	6	2	2	2	8	8	1.000	6
Airdrieonians	6	1	2	3	13	14	0.929	4

Home team	Score	Away team	Date
Airdrieonians	4–0	Dundee	13 August 1955
Kilmarnock	0–0	St Mirren	13 August 1955
Dundee	1–2	Kilmarnock	17 August 1955
St Mirren	3–2	Airdrieonians	17 August 1955
Dundee	2–0	St Mirren	20 August 1955
Kilmarnock	2–0	Airdrieonians	20 August 1955
Dundee	2–2	Airdrieonians	27 August 1955
St Mirren	3–0	Kilmarnock	27 August 1955
Airdrieonians	2–4	St Mirren	31 August 1955
Kilmarnock	0–0	Dundee	31 August 1955
Airdrieonians	3–3	Kilmarnock	3 September 1955
St Mirren	0–3	Dundee	3 September 1955

=== Group 2 ===
Team	Pld	W	D	L	GF	GA	GR	Pts
Heart of Midlothian	6	5	0	1	15	2	7.500	10
Partick Thistle	6	4	0	2	11	7	1.571	8
East Fife	6	2	0	4	8	13	0.615	4
Raith Rovers	6	1	0	5	4	16	0.250	2

Home team	Score	Away team	Date
Partick Thistle	0–2	Heart of Midlothian	13 August 1955
Raith Rovers	2–4	East Fife	13 August 1955
East Fife	2–3	Partick Thistle	17 August 1955
Heart of Midlothian	5–0	Raith Rovers	17 August 1955
East Fife	1–0	Heart of Midlothian	20 August 1955
Partick Thistle	4–0	Raith Rovers	20 August 1955
East Fife	0–2	Raith Rovers	27 August 1955
Heart of Midlothian	2–1	Partick Thistle	27 August 1955
Partick Thistle	2–1	East Fife	31 August 1955
Raith Rovers	0–2	Heart of Midlothian	31 August 1955
Heart of Midlothian	4–0	East Fife	3 September 1955
Raith Rovers	0–1	Partick Thistle	3 September 1955

=== Group 3 ===
Team	Pld	W	D	L	GF	GA	GR	Pts
Aberdeen	6	5	1	0	13	8	1.625	11
Hibernian	6	3	1	2	11	8	1.375	7
Dunfermline Athletic	6	1	1	4	12	16	0.750	3
Clyde	6	1	1	4	11	15	0.733	3

Home team	Score	Away team	Date
Dunfermline Athletic	4–2	Clyde	13 August 1955
Hibernian	0–1	Aberdeen	13 August 1955
Aberdeen	3–2	Dunfermline Athletic	17 August 1955
Clyde	2–2	Hibernian	17 August 1955
Aberdeen	3–2	Clyde	20 August 1955
Hibernian	3–1	Dunfermline Athletic	20 August 1955
Aberdeen	2–1	Hibernian	27 August 1955
Clyde	3–2	Dunfermline Athletic	27 August 1955
Dunfermline Athletic	2–2	Aberdeen	31 August 1955
Hibernian	2–1	Clyde	31 August 1955
Clyde	1–2	Aberdeen	3 September 1955
Dunfermline Athletic	1–3	Hibernian	3 September 1955

=== Group 4 ===
Team	Pld	W	D	L	GF	GA	GR	Pts
Rangers	6	5	0	1	22	8	2.750	10
Celtic	6	4	1	1	16	9	1.778	9
Falkirk	6	2	1	3	12	15	0.800	5
Queen of the South	6	0	0	6	3	21	0.143	0

Home team	Score	Away team	Date
Celtic	4–2	Queen of the South	13 August 1955
Falkirk	0–5	Rangers	13 August 1955
Queen of the South	0–2	Celtic	17 August 1955
Rangers	4–3	Falkirk	17 August 1955
Celtic	5–1	Falkirk	20 August 1955
Queen of the South	1–2	Rangers	20 August 1955
Queen of the South	0–3	Falkirk	27 August 1955
Rangers	1–4	Celtic	27 August 1955
Celtic	0–4	Rangers	31 August 1955
Falkirk	4–0	Queen of the South	31 August 1955
Falkirk	1–1	Celtic	3 September 1955
Rangers	6–0	Queen of the South	3 September 1955

=== Group 5 ===
Team	Pld	W	D	L	GF	GA	GR	Pts
Hamilton Academical	6	4	2	0	20	6	3.333	10
Alloa Athletic	6	3	2	1	18	15	1.200	8
Cowdenbeath	6	2	1	3	16	18	0.889	5
Arbroath	6	0	1	5	7	22	0.318	1

Home team	Score	Away team	Date
Alloa Athletic	5–3	Arbroath	13 August 1955
Hamilton Academical	6–1	Cowdenbeath	13 August 1955
Arbroath	1–2	Hamilton Academical	17 August 1955
Cowdenbeath	5–3	Alloa Athletic	17 August 1955
Cowdenbeath	5–1	Arbroath	20 August 1955
Hamilton Academical	1–1	Alloa Athletic	20 August 1955
Arbroath	1–2	Alloa Athletic	27 August 1955
Cowdenbeath	1–2	Hamilton Academical	27 August 1955
Alloa Athletic	5–3	Cowdenbeath	31 August 1955
Hamilton Academical	7–0	Arbroath	31 August 1955
Alloa Athletic	2–2	Hamilton Academical	3 September 1955
Arbroath	1–1	Cowdenbeath	3 September 1955

=== Group 6 ===
Team	Pld	W	D	L	GF	GA	GR	Pts
St Johnstone	6	5	0	1	16	7	2.286	10
Stirling Albion	6	2	1	3	8	10	0.800	5
Ayr United	6	2	1	3	10	16	0.625	5
Queen's Park	6	2	0	4	8	9	0.889	4

Home team	Score	Away team	Date
Queen's Park	3–0	Stirling Albion	13 August 1955
St Johnstone	5–1	Ayr United	13 August 1955
Ayr United	3–2	Queen's Park	17 August 1955
Stirling Albion	0–1	St Johnstone	17 August 1955
Queen's Park	1–2	St Johnstone	20 August 1955
Stirling Albion	3–1	Ayr United	20 August 1955
Ayr United	3–2	St Johnstone	27 August 1955
Stirling Albion	1–0	Queen's Park	27 August 1955
Queen's Park	2–0	Ayr United	31 August 1955
St Johnstone	3–2	Stirling Albion	31 August 1955
Ayr United	2–2	Stirling Albion	3 September 1955
St Johnstone	3–0	Queen's Park	3 September 1955

=== Group 7 ===
Team	Pld	W	D	L	GF	GA	GR	Pts
Motherwell	6	6	0	0	24	3	8.000	12
Albion Rovers	6	2	1	3	8	12	0.667	5
Dundee United	6	2	1	3	13	20	0.650	5
Forfar Athletic	6	1	0	5	8	18	0.444	2

Home team	Score	Away team	Date
Dundee United	1–3	Albion Rovers	13 August 1955
Forfar Athletic	1–6	Motherwell	13 August 1955
Albion Rovers	1–0	Forfar Athletic	17 August 1955
Motherwell	7–1	Dundee United	17 August 1955
Albion Rovers	0–2	Motherwell	20 August 1955
Forfar Athletic	2–5	Dundee United	20 August 1955
Albion Rovers	3–3	Dundee United	27 August 1955
Motherwell	2–1	Forfar Athletic	27 August 1955
Dundee United	0–3	Motherwell	31 August 1955
Forfar Athletic	2–1	Albion Rovers	31 August 1955
Dundee United	3–2	Forfar Athletic	3 September 1955
Motherwell	4–0	Albion Rovers	3 September 1955

=== Group 8 ===
Team	Pld	W	D	L	GF	GA	GR	Pts
Morton	6	4	0	2	16	9	1.778	8
Brechin City	6	3	1	2	14	14	1.000	7
Third Lanark	6	2	1	3	7	9	0.778	5
Stenhousemuir	6	1	2	3	9	14	0.643	4

Home team	Score	Away team	Date
Brechin City	2–1	Third Lanark	13 August 1955
Morton	3–1	Stenhousemuir	13 August 1955
Stenhousemuir	2–0	Brechin City	17 August 1955
Third Lanark	1–0	Morton	17 August 1955
Morton	7–1	Brechin City	20 August 1955
Stenhousemuir	1–1	Third Lanark	20 August 1955
Stenhousemuir	2–4	Morton	27 August 1955
Third Lanark	1–4	Brechin City	27 August 1955
Brechin City	3–3	Stenhousemuir	31 August 1955
Morton	2–0	Third Lanark	31 August 1955
Brechin City	4–0	Morton	3 September 1955
Third Lanark	3–0	Stenhousemuir	3 September 1955

=== Group 9 ===
Team	Pld	W	D	L	GF	GA	GR	Pts
Dumbarton	4	3	1	0	13	4	3.250	7
East Stirlingshire	4	3	0	1	14	12	1.167	6
Stranraer	4	1	1	2	8	12	0.667	3
Berwick Rangers	4	1	0	3	5	7	0.714	2
Montrose	4	1	0	3	6	11	0.545	2

Home team	Score	Away team	Date
Dumbarton	2–0	Berwick Rangers	13 August 1955
Stranraer	3–2	Montrose	13 August 1955
Berwick Rangers	2–0	Stranraer	17 August 1955
Montrose	2–5	East Stirlingshire	17 August 1955
East Stirlingshire	5–2	Stranraer	20 August 1955
Montrose	0–2	Dumbarton	20 August 1955
East Stirlingshire	3–2	Berwick Rangers	27 August 1955
Stranraer	3–3	Dumbarton	27 August 1955
Berwick Rangers	1–2	Montrose	3 September 1955
Dumbarton	6–1	East Stirlingshire	3 September 1955

== Supplementary round ==
=== First leg ===
Home team	Score	Away team	Date
Dumbarton	2–1	Morton	6 September 1955

=== Second leg ===
Home team	Score	Away team	Date	Agg
Morton	0–1	Dumbarton	8 September 1955	1–3

== Quarter-finals ==
=== First leg ===
Home team	Score	Away team	Date
Aberdeen	5–3	Heart of Midlothian	14 September 1955
Hamilton Academical	1–2	Rangers	14 September 1955
St Johnstone	1–2	Motherwell	14 September 1955
St Mirren	5–1	Dumbarton	14 September 1955

=== Second leg ===
Home team	Score	Away team	Date	Agg
Dumbarton	1–1	St Mirren	17 September 1955	2–6
Heart of Midlothian	2–4	Aberdeen	17 September 1955	5–9
Motherwell	0–1	St Johnstone	17 September 1955	2–2
Rangers	8–0	Hamilton Academical	17 September 1955	10–1

=== Replay ===
Home team	Score	Away team	Date
Motherwell	2–0	St Johnstone	21 September 1955

== Semi-finals ==
=== Ties ===
Home team	Score	Away team	Date
Aberdeen	2–1	Rangers	1 October 1955
St Mirren	3–3	Motherwell	1 October 1955

=== Replay ===
Home team	Score	Away team	Date
St Mirren	2–0	Motherwell	8 October 1955

== Final ==
22 October 1955

Aberdeen	2–1	St Mirren
Mallan (o.g.); Leggat		Holmes

Hampden Park, Glasgow
Attendance: 44,106
