= Jackie McGugan =

Scottish footballer

John Hannah "Jackie" McGugan (12 June 1939 – 15 November 2015) was a Scottish footballer, who played for Pollok, St Mirren, Leeds United, Tranmere Rovers, Ayr United, Greenock Morton and Cambridge City.

McGugan was part of the St Mirren team that won the 1959 Scottish Cup Final, when he was aged 19. He was then selected for a Scotland squad that toured Denmark, Netherlands and Portugal. McGugan played in one unofficial match for Scotland during the tour, against a Jutland representative team. After being dropped from the St Mirren team in 1960, McGugan requested a transfer and subsequently moved to Leeds. He suffered injuries during his time there and was unable to displace Jack Charlton from their first XI. McGugan later played for Tranmere Rovers, Ayr United, Greenock Morton and Cambridge City.

Having played for Cambridge City for six years, McGugan continued to live in the city after he retired from playing football.

== Sources ==
- Jackie McGugan at Post War English & Scottish Football League A–Z Player's Transfer Database
