= Ally Miller (footballer) =

Scottish footballer (born 1936)

Personal information
- Full name: James Alistair Williamson Miller
- Date of birth: 24 January 1936 (age 90)
- Place of birth: Glasgow, Scotland
- Position: Winger

Senior career*
Years	Team	Apps	(Gls)
1953–57	Third Lanark	47	(16)
1957–62	St Mirren	112	(21)
1961–62	Brighton & Hove Albion	1	(0)
1962–64	Norwich City	23	(2)
1964–65	Berwick Rangers	39	(6)
1965–66	Dumbarton	21	(4)
1966–67	Hamilton Academical	34	(3)
- * Club domestic league appearances and goals

Ally Miller (born 24 January 1936) is a Scottish former footballer, who played for Third Lanark, St Mirren, Brighton & Hove Albion, Norwich City, Berwick Rangers, Dumbarton and Hamilton Academical. Miller was part of the St Mirren team that won the 1959 Scottish Cup Final.
