= 1999–2000 Scottish First Division =

Scottish First Division
- Season: 1999–2000
- Champions: St Mirren
- Promoted: St Mirren; Dunfermline Athletic
- Relegated: Airdrieonians; Clydebank
- Top goalscorer: Mark Yardley (19)
- Biggest home win: St Mirren 8-0 Clydebank, 11 March 2000; Falkirk 8-0 Airdrieonians, 18 March 2000
- Biggest away win: Raith Rovers 0-6 St Mirren, 14 August 1999
- Average attendance: 2877

The 1999–2000 Scottish First Division was won by St Mirren, finishing as one of two promoted teams. As the Scottish Premier League was being expanded to twelve teams Dunfermline Athletic were to be joined by Falkirk in a three team playoff against Aberdeen with the top two placed teams entering the Scottish Premier League. However, this did not occur as Falkirk's Brockville Stadium did not meet the then SPL requirements for having a 10,000 all-seater stadium. Clydebank finished bottom and were relegated to the Scottish Second Division.

== Stadia and locations ==
| Airdrieonians | Ayr United | Clydebank | Dunfermline Athletic |
|---|---|---|---|
| Excelsior Stadium | Somerset Park | Cappielow Park, Greenock | East End Park |
| Capacity: 10,101 | Capacity: 10,185 | Capacity: 11,612 | Capacity: 11,480 |
| Falkirk | Club from the Highland council area | Clubs from the South of Scotland | Greenock Morton |
| Brockville Park | Club from the Highland council area | Clubs from the South of Scotland | Cappielow Park |
| Capacity: 7,500 | Club from the Highland council area | Clubs from the South of Scotland | Capacity: 11,612 |
| Inverness Caledonian Thistle | Livingston | Raith Rovers | St Mirren |
| Caledonian Stadium | Almondvale Stadium | Stark's Park | Love Street |
| Capacity: 6,280 | Capacity: 10,112 | Capacity: 9,031 | Capacity: 10,900 |

== League table ==
| Pos | Team | Pld | W | D | L | GF | GA | GD | Pts | Promotion or relegation |
|---|---|---|---|---|---|---|---|---|---|---|
| 1 | St Mirren (C, P) | 36 | 23 | 7 | 6 | 75 | 39 | +36 | 76 | Promotion to the Premier League |
| 2 | Dunfermline Athletic (P) | 36 | 20 | 11 | 5 | 66 | 33 | +33 | 71 | Promotion to the Premier League |
| 3 | Falkirk | 36 | 20 | 8 | 8 | 67 | 40 | +27 | 68 | |
| 4 | Livingston | 36 | 19 | 7 | 10 | 60 | 45 | +15 | 64 | |
| 5 | Raith Rovers | 36 | 17 | 8 | 11 | 55 | 40 | +15 | 59 | |
| 6 | Inverness CT | 36 | 13 | 10 | 13 | 60 | 55 | +5 | 49 | |
| 7 | Ayr United | 36 | 10 | 8 | 18 | 42 | 52 | −10 | 38 | |
| 8 | Morton | 36 | 10 | 6 | 20 | 45 | 61 | −16 | 36 | |
| 9 | Airdrieonians | 36 | 7 | 8 | 21 | 29 | 69 | −40 | 29 | |
| 10 | Clydebank (R) | 36 | 1 | 7 | 28 | 17 | 82 | −65 | 10 | Relegation to the Second Division |

Source: "1999-2000 First Division - SPFL Archive". SPFL.
Rules for classification: 1) points; 2) goal difference; 3) number of goals scored.
(C) Champions; (P) Promoted; (R) Relegated

== Top scorers ==
| Player | Club | Goals |
|---|---|---|
| (Scotland) Mark Yardley | St Mirren | 19 |
| (Scotland) Stevie Crawford | Dunfermline Athletic | 16 |
| (Scotland) Barry Lavety | St Mirren | 16 |
| (Scotland) Brian McPhee | Livingston | 15 |
| (Scotland) David Bingham | Livingston | 15 |
| (South Africa) Glynn Hurst | Ayr United | 14 |
| (Scotland) Scott Crabbe | Falkirk | 14 |
| (Scotland) Barry Wilson | Inverness CT | 12 |
| (Scotland) Craig Dargo | Raith Rovers | 12 |
| (Scotland) David Nicholls | Falkirk | 11 |

== Attendances ==
The average attendances for Scottish First Division clubs for season 1999/00 are shown below:

| Club | Average |
|---|---|
| Dunfermline Athletic | 4,959 |
| St Mirren | 4,946 |
| Livingston | 3,974 |
| Falkirk | 3,344 |
| Raith Rovers | 3,165 |
| Inverness CT | 2,282 |
| Ayr United | 2,180 |
| Airdrieonians | 1,857 |
| Greenock Morton | 1,356 |
| Clydebank | 712 |
