= Stevie Mallan (footballer, born 1967) =

Scottish footballer

Personal information
- Full name: Stephen Patrick Mallan
- Date of birth: 30 August 1967 (age 59)
- Place of birth: Glasgow, Scotland
- Position: Striker

Senior career*
Years	Team	Apps	(Gls)
1988–1989	Kirkintilloch Rob Roy		
1989–1993	Clyde	70	(13)
1993–2000	Queen of the South	232	(82)
2000–2002	Arbroath	52	(16)
2001	→ Forfar Athletic (loan)	3	(0)
2002–2003	Stirling Albion	31	(6)
2003	Stenhousemuir	6	(1)
2003–2004	Dumbarton	5	(0)
2004–2005	Glenafton Athletic		
2005–2011	Auchinleck Talbot		
2011	St Anthony's		
Total		399	(118)
- * Club domestic league appearances and goals

Stephen Mallan (born 30 August 1967) is a Scottish former footballer who played as a striker, mainly for Queen of the South. Mallan's other clubs included Clyde, Arbroath, Stirling Albion, Stenhousemuir and Dumbarton.

== Playing career ==
Born in Glasgow, Mallan did not play for any club in his teenage years and started his career in Scottish Junior football with Kirkintilloch Rob Roy at the age of 20, before joining the senior ranks with Clyde for the start of the 1989–90 season.

Mallan then joined Dumfries club Queen of the South at the start of the 1993–94 season. In his time at the Doonhamers Mallan scored 94 goals and is the eighth highest goalscorer in the club's history. This tally includes 82 league goals in his 232 league appearances. Mallan played in the 1997–98 Challenge Cup Final at Fir Park, when Queen of the South put in a spirited performance in a 1–0 defeat to Falkirk, who were playing in the division above Queens at that time. Nicknamed 'Marvo', Mallan was a fans' favourite and cult-hero and ended up playing seven seasons at Palmerston before being released by John Connolly in the summer of 2000.

Mallan then went on to play for Arbroath, Stirling Albion (where he scored versus Heart of Midlothian in a Scottish League Cup match), Stenhousemuir and Dumbarton.

Mallan then returned to Junior football, where he signed for Glenafton in New Cumnock as a player-coach and after one season moved to near-neighbours Auchinleck Talbot. In his first year playing for the Bot and aged 39, Mallan scored in the 2006 Scottish Junior Cup Final with a 30-yard header, after the opposing Bathgate Thistle goalkeeper slipped trying to collect the ball. Mallan also appeared from the substitutes' bench and set up the winning goal in the 2009 Scottish Junior Cup Final, and at the end of a six-year spell with Auchinleck Mallan again appeared as a substitute in the 2011 Scottish Junior Cup Final at 44 years old. Mallan then went on to play for Glasgow club St Anthony's for a brief spell.

More recently, Mallan has been coaching at St Mirren's Youth Academy.

== Personal life ==
Stevie is the third of four generations of Mallans to play football at a high level. His grandfather, Jim or Jimmy was a defender with Celtic and St Mirren and was selected for the Scottish Football League XI with the Hoops in 1949 and played in the 1955 Scottish League Cup Final with the Buddies. Mallan's father, also named Jimmy, played Junior football as a striker and scored a hat-trick for Johnstone Burgh in the 1964 Scottish Junior Cup Final. Mallan's son Stephen, who was born in 1996, debuted for St Mirren as a midfielder in November 2014 before moving to England to play for Barnsley and back to Scotland with Hibernian.
