= Barry Lavety =

Scottish footballer

Personal information
- Date of birth: 21 August 1974 (age 52)
- Place of birth: Paisley, Scotland
- Height: 6 ft 0 in (1.83 m)
- Position: Striker

Senior career*
Years	Team	Apps	(Gls)
1991–1996	St Mirren	149	(48)
1996–2001	Hibernian	62	(9)
1999–2001	→ St Mirren (loan)	29	(16)
2001–2002	Clydebank	8	(3)
2002–2003	TeamBath	0	(0)
2003–2004	St Mirren	13	(0)
2004–2005	Neilston	0	(0)
	Pollok	0	(0)
- KR Reykjavik
- Des Moines Menace
Total		261	(76)

International career
1993–1994	Scotland U21	9	(0)
- * Club domestic league appearances and goals

Barry Lavety (born 21 August 1974) is a Scottish former footballer. He notably played for St Mirren and Hibernian, as well as representing the Scotland U21 team.

== Career ==
Lavety started his career with St Mirren in season 1991–92. In the following season he scored 20 goals as St Mirren narrowly missed out on a return to the Scottish Premier Division. Lavety failed a drugs test for the recreational drug ecstasy in 1995.

Lavety moved to Hibernian. He scored on his debut in a 2–0 win against Brechin City in August, but injury problems dogged him and he only managed eight games in his first season at Hibs. His absence did not help a team who narrowly avoided relegation thanks to a play-off victory against Airdrieonians. Altogether he made 43 starts for Hibernian, with a further 23 sub appearances. He scored 12 goals and was top scorer with 9 goals the year Hibs were relegated to the First Division. He made his final appearance as a substitute against Falkirk on the day Hibs were presented with the First Division title, in May 1999.

Lavety moved back to St Mirren on loan, scoring 15 goals in their 1999–00 title-winning season before he was bedeviled by injury problems. Lavety was part of TeamBath, the team who became the first university side to qualify for the FA Cup proper for 122 years. He also had spells with Clydebank, Pollok, KR Reykjavik of Iceland and with Des Moines Menace in America before his return to St Mirren. He had been on trial at Love Street in the summer of 2003, and scored against Gretna before signing for two years on a part-time deal. When Gus MacPherson took over the manager job, Lavety was restored to the team and scored against Airdrie United in the Scottish Cup. That goal took him past former Saint Mark Yardley in the post-war scorer's chart, but it was his last in Saints colours. His final game came against Ayr United towards the end of the season, and Lavety helped the side overcome a 0–1 deficit, which was turned into a 4–1 victory.

Lavety left in the summer of 2004 and signed for junior side Neilston, playing alongside fellow ex-Saints James McGuire and Chris Kerr, but left them the following summer. Lavety returned to action for St Mirren in the Selco Masters tournament on 12 June 2011.
