= Robert Calder Campbell =

Scottish army officer in the East India Company and writer

- Born: 1798; Ardersier, Scotland
- Died: 13 May 1857 (aged 58/59); London, England
- Burial place: Highgate Cemetery
- Military career
- Allegiance: East India Company
- Branch: Madras Army
- Service years: 1818–1839
- Rank: Major
- Conflicts: First Anglo-Burmese War
- Awards: Indian War-Medal

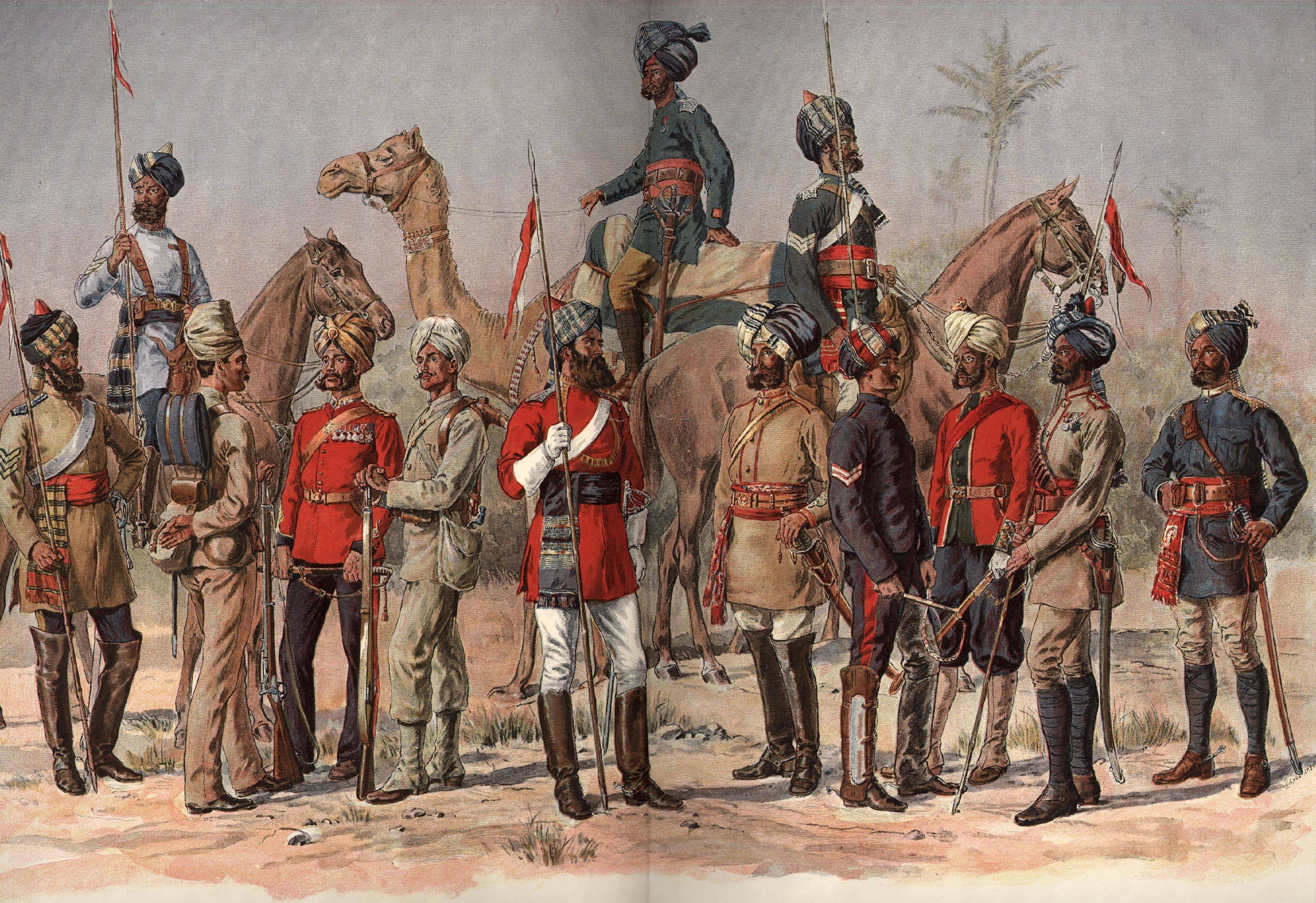
Sepoys in the Madras Army (1800s)

Major Robert Calder Campbell (1798–1857) was a British soldier and miscellaneous writer. He was made a cadet in the East India Company's service in 1817; promoted to captain in 1826; served in Burma from 1826–27; was invalided home in 1831; settled in London; promoted to major in 1836; and retired in 1839. He published verse and prose from 1831–1857.

== Life ==
Campbell was born in Scotland in 1798, the son of Rev. Pryce Campbell, the Presbyterian minister in Ardersier. In 1817 he obtained a cadetship in the service of the British East India Company, and was commissioned as a lieutenant in the Madras Army on 2 October 1818. Promoted to captain on 3 October 1826 during the First Anglo-Burmese War, Campbell served in the 43rd regiment of Madras native infantry from 1826–7, and was decorated with the Indian war-medal for services rendered. He was invalided out of active service in 1831 and promoted to major in 1836, before retiring from the army in 1839.

Upon returning from India, Campbell was introduced by the sculptor Alexander Munro to Dante Gabriel and William Michael Rossetti, with whom he became good friends. He subsequently published short stories, prose sketches and poetry in numerous periodicals and assisted with the publication of the Germ in 1850. Campbell contributed a sensuous love sonnet in the style of Keats.

Campbell died at his residence in University Street, London, on 13 May 1857 and was buried on the western side of Highgate Cemetery. He was eulogised by the Athenæum as "a graceful writer of the minor prose and poetry of his time, and a kind-hearted scholar and gentleman."

== Works ==
- Lays from the East. London: Smith, Elder & Co., 1831.
- The Palmer's Last Session, and Other Short Poems. London: Houlston & Hughes, 1838.
- Rough Recollections of Rambles at Home and Abroad, Vol. I, Vol. II, Vol. III. London: Newby, 1847.
- Winter Nights. London: Newby, 1850.
- The Three Trials of Loïde. London: William Shobert, 1851.
- Episodes in the War-life of a Soldier, with Sketches in Prose and Verse. London: William Skeffington, 1857.

== Sources ==
- Feldman, Paula R. and Daniel Robinson, eds. (1999). A Century of Sonnets: The Romantic-Era Revival. Oxford: Oxford University Press. p. 211.
- Fhlathúin, Máire ní, ed. (2016). The Poetry of British India, 1780–1905. New York: Routledge.
- Hosmon, Robert Stahr (1969). "'The Germ' (1850) and 'The Oxford and Cambridge Magazine' (1856)". Victorian Periodicals Newsletter, no. 4. pp. 36–47. JSTOR. Accessed 19 August 2021.
- Rossetti, William Michael, ed. (1901). The Germ: being a facsimile reprint of the literary organ of the Pre-Raphaelite Brotherhood. London. pp. 8, 12, 18, 68.
- The Calcutta Review, Vol. XXIX, July–December 1857. Calcutta: Thacker, Spink & Co., 1857. pp. xxviii–xxx.

Attribution:

- This article incorporates text from a publication now in the public domain: Chichester, Henry Manners (1885–1900). "Campbell, Robert Calder". In Lee, Sidney (ed.). Dictionary of National Biography. Vol. 392. London: Smith, Elder & Co. p. 391.
