= Gerry Baker =

American soccer player

Personal information
- Full name: Gerard Austin Baker
- Date of birth: 11 April 1938
- Place of birth: New Rochelle, New York, United States
- Date of death: 24 August 2013 (aged 75)
- Place of death: Wishaw, Scotland
- Height: 5 ft 7 in (1.70 m)
- Position: Forward

Youth career
- Craigneuk Boys Club

Senior career*
Years	Team	Apps	(Gls)
1955	Larkhall Thistle		
1955–1956	Chelsea	0	(0)
1956–1958	Motherwell	11	(4)
1958–1960	St Mirren	63	(42)
1960–1961	Manchester City	37	(14)
1961–1963	Hibernian	59	(27)
1963–1967	Ipswich Town	135	(58)
1967–1970	Coventry City	31	(5)
1969	→ Brentford (loan)	8	(2)
1970–1971	Margate	40	(10)
1971–1973	Nuneaton Borough	45	(15)
1973–1974	Bedworth United		
1974–1975	Worcester City	7	(2)
Total		429	(179)

International career
1968–1969	United States	7	(2)

Managerial career
- 1970–1971: Margate
- * Club domestic league appearances and goals

Gerard Austin Baker (11 April 1938 – 24 August 2013) was a Scottish-American soccer player. From 1955 until 1970, he played 16 seasons in either the Scottish or English first division. He earned seven caps with the US national team in 1968 and 1969, scoring two goals. His younger brother was the footballer Joe Baker.

== Youth ==
Baker was born to Scottish parents in New Rochelle, New York, where they were settled at the time. In 1939, his parents moved for a short while to Liverpool, where Gerry's brother, future England international Joe Baker, was born. Their father volunteered in the Merchant Marine during World War II and died on active service. The family was evacuated to Scotland, and the brothers were raised in Motherwell. He attended Park Primary and St Joseph's Secondary schools. He played football for Craigneuk Boys Club and was selected for Lanarkshire Schools. He signed with Larkhall Thistle when he was fourteen and played in six games.

He transferred to Chelsea in May 1949, aged 17, and played in their youth and third team in the 1955–56 season. The following season, he appeared in six games for their reserves (scoring four goals), plus their third team. He returned to Scotland in late 1956 due to homesickness.

== Professional ==
Baker signed with Scottish First Division club Motherwell, where he played as outside left, in December 1956. Over the next three years he played thirteen games with the first team, scoring four goals. Motherwell transferred Baker to St Mirren during the 1958–59 season, as he was unable to oust Ian St John and Pat Quinn from their team.

He scored the winning goal for St Mirren on his debut, a 2–1 victory against a Hibernian team containing his brother Joe. On 25 April 1959, he scored the third goal in St Mirren's 3–1 victory against Aberdeen in the 1959 Scottish Cup Final. That was his eighth goal of the 1958–59 Scottish Cup, as he scored in every round. On 30 January 1960, he scored ten goals in a 15–0 win over Glasgow University. Baker was the club's top goalscorer in both the 1958–59 and 1959–60 seasons.

By this time, top English clubs were beginning to notice and in November 1960, Manchester City paid £17,000 for him (the deal also involved defender John McTavish moving in the opposite direction). Baker spent only the remainder of the 1960–61 season and the beginning of 1961–62 with City, before they sold his contract to Hibernian for £18,000 in November 1961. Over the next two years, Baker scored 43 goals in 84 games for Hibs before moving to Ipswich Town in December 1963. Ipswich paid £25,000 for him, and the player more than returned this investment by scoring 66 goals in 151 games. Ipswich then transferred Baker to Coventry City in November 1967. Over the next two seasons, he scored only six times in thirty games with Coventry. In October 1969, Coventry loaned Baker to Brentford where he scored two goals in eight games; he was released by Coventry at the end of the season.

Baker then signed as a player-manager with non-league Margate. He was limited by several injuries, first a dislocated shoulder in August 1970, then broken ribs in November. Despite these, he played a total of 48 games and scored sixteen goals before leaving the club on 30 September 1971. He then joined Nuneaton Borough before finishing his playing career with Bedworth United.

== National team ==
Baker held dual US and British citizenship, and when it became apparent that he would not be selected for Scotland or England, he elected to make himself available for the US team. He joined the US as it began qualifying matches for the 1970 FIFA World Cup. His first cap came in a 4–2 World Cup qualifying loss to Canada on 17 October 1968. Over the next month, Baker started six games with the US. On 2 November 1968 he scored two goals in a 6–2 qualification victory over Bermuda. His last game with the US came in a 1–0 loss to Haiti on 11 May 1969. That loss put the US out of contention for a spot in the finals.

== Coaching ==
In 1970, Baker entered the managerial ranks at Margate when he was hired as the club's player-manager. He remained in this position until he left the club in September 1971. He later managed the Coventry Collier team in 1979–80.

== Post-football career ==
After retiring from playing professionally, Baker worked at the Coventry Jaguar factory. His daughters, Karen (born 1962) and Lorraine (born 1964), were both athletes; Lorraine placed fifth in the 800 metres final at the 1984 Olympic Games. His grandson, Ryan Strain, is also a professional footballer, who also played for St Mirren. Baker was inducted to the St Mirren Hall of Fame in May 2007. He died in August 2013, aged 75.
