= Robert C. Campbell =

British military officer (1885–1966)

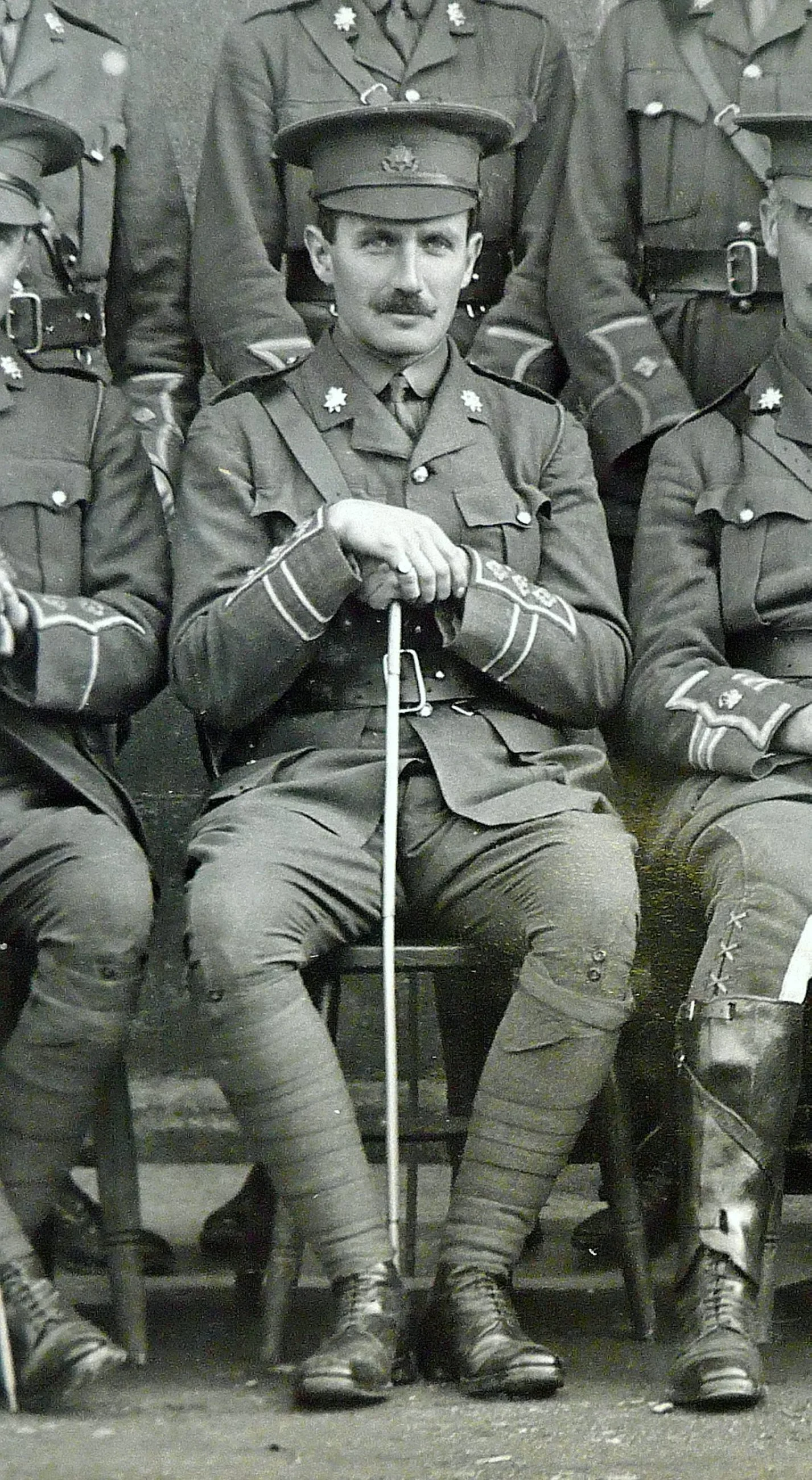
- Born: 1885
- Died: July 1966 (aged 81); Isle of Wight, England
- Military career
- Allegiance: United Kingdom
- Rank: Captain
- Commands: 1 Bn, East Surrey Regiment
- Conflicts: World War I; Battle of Mons (POW)

Robert C. Campbell (1885 – July 1966) was a Captain in the British Army in WWI. Captured as a prisoner of war by Imperial Germany in 1914, he was held in captivity for two years before appealing to Kaiser Wilhelm II for a visit to his dying mother. His request was granted and after a two-week visit he voluntarily returned to the POW camp, where he remained until the end of the war.

== Military career ==
The British Expeditionary Force (BEF) was engaging the Imperial German Army during the Battle of Mons. During this engagement 14,000 British soldiers were killed, wounded or missing. One of those made POW was Campbell. On 24 August 1914, while serving with the 1st Battalion of East Surrey Regiment, Campbell was taken prisoner. The war diary of the 1st Battalion recorded that on 23 August 1914 that it was a misty and wet day. During fighting on the 24 August five officers and 134 soldiers were lost including Campbell.

He spent two years in captivity, at a POW camp in Magdeburg, central Germany, when he got word from his sister that his mother, Louisa, was dying. He wrote to the German Kaiser pleading that he be allowed to visit his dying mother. His petition was successful and arrangements were made through the embassy of the United States of America, which was neutral at the time. Campbell was made to swear that he return to the POW camp after seeing his mother. Richard van Emden, writing in his 2013 book Meeting the Enemy, speculated that Campbell would have felt it honourable to return and "he would have thought 'if I don't go back no other officer will ever be released on this basis'". He crossed into neutral the Netherlands from Germany and took a ferry to the UK. He later returned to Germany by the same route.

Later during his sojourn as a POW, Campbell and other prisoners spent nine months digging a tunnel to escape from their camp and attempted to reach the Dutch border. He was captured near the border and sent back into captivity.

After the war, Campbell returned to Britain; he served in the military until 1925.

== Death ==
Campbell died in July 1966, aged 81, on the Isle of Wight.

== See also ==
- Prisoners of war in World War I
- Marcus Atilius Regulus (consul 267 BC) — Roman who, according to legend, was released under honor oath to return and indeed returned to captivity

== Bibliography ==
Notes

References

- BBC News (4 September 2013). "The British WWI prisoner of war who returned to captivity". BBC News.
- van Emden, Richard (2013). Meeting the Enemy: The Human Face of the Great War. Bloomsbury Publishing. ISBN 9781408839812. - Total pages: 400
- Wynn, Stephen (2016). Gravesend in the Great War. Pen & Sword Books. ISBN 9781473864962. - Total pages: 224
