= Jens Paeslack =

German footballer (born 1974)

Personal information
- Date of birth: 25 February 1974 (age 52)
- Place of birth: Hamburg, West Germany
- Height: 1.91 m (6 ft 3 in)
- Position: Forward

Senior career*
Years	Team	Apps	(Gls)
1995–1996	Harburger TB		
1997	SV Lurup		
1997–1998	VfB Lübeck		
1998	ÍBV	14	(4)
1998–1999	TSV Pansdorf		
1999–2002	Karlsruher SC	4	(0)
1999–2001	→ St Mirren (loan)	16	(1)
2001	→ AEL Limassol (loan)	13	(1)
2002	→ Stuttgarter Kickers (loan)	9	(2)
2002	SV Sandhausen	12	(3)
2003	SSV Reutlingen	12	(1)
2003–2004	Borussia Fulda	12	(5)
2004	Sachsen Leipzig	10	(7)
2005	Kickers Emden	11	(2)
2005–2006	Waldhof Mannheim	0	(0)

Managerial career
- 2010: Germania Schnelsen (assistant manager)
- 2010–2011: Germania Schnelsen
- * Club domestic league appearances and goals

Jens Paeslack (born 25 February 1974) is a German former professional footballer played as a forward.
