= Jackie Neilson =

Scottish footballer

John Neilson (1 April 1929 – 22 June 2012) was a Scottish footballer who played for St Mirren in the Scottish Football League. He also represented the Scottish Football League XI four times, played in an unofficial match for the Scotland B team against the 'A' team in 1955, and one full 'B' match against England the following year.
