= 2000–01 Scottish Premier League =

95th season of top-tier football league in Scotland

Scottish Premier League
- Season: 2000–01
- Dates: 29 July 2000 – 20 May 2001
- Champions: Celtic; 1st Premier League title 37th Scottish title
- Relegated: St Mirren
- Champions League: Celtic; Rangers
- UEFA Cup: Hibernian; Kilmarnock
- Intertoto Cup: Dundee
- Matches: 228
- Goals: 605 (2.65 per match)
- Top goalscorer: Henrik Larsson (35)
- Biggest home win: Rangers 7–1 St Mirren (4 November); Celtic 6–0 Aberdeen (16 December); Celtic 6–0 Kilmarnock (2 January); Hearts 7–1 Dunfermline Athletic (24 February)
- Biggest away win: Dundee United 0–4 Celtic (26 December); Dundee United 0–4 Hearts (14 October)
- Highest scoring: Celtic 6–2 Rangers (27 August); Dundee United 3–5 Aberdeen (23 September); Hibernian 6–2 Hearts (22 October); Rangers 7–1 St Mirren (4 November); Hearts 7–1 Dunfermline Athletic (24 February)
- Highest attendance: 60,440, Celtic 1–0 St Mirren (7 April)
- Lowest attendance: 2,610, Dunfermline Athletic 1–2 Motherwell (12 May)
- Average attendance: 15,905 ( 2,089)

The 2000–01 Scottish Premier League (known as the 2000–01 Bank of Scotland Premier League for sponsorship reasons) was the third season of the Scottish Premier League, the top level of football in Scotland. It began on 29 July 2000 and concluded on 20 May 2001.

Rangers were the defending champions.

Celtic finished the season as league champions by a 15-point margin over Rangers, also winning both of the domestic cups to complete a domestic treble, in their first season under the management of Martin O'Neill.

== Changes from 1999–2000 season ==
2000–01 saw the Scottish Premier League (SPL) expanded from 10 to 12 clubs, which was part of the agreement reached between the clubs in the SPL and the Scottish Football League when the top-tier clubs broke away in 1998.

With the expansion of the league, the league 'split' was introduced to avoid the need for clubs to play 44 fixtures in a season, which would be the case if the quadruple round-robin format of the previous season was followed. Instead, after 33 rounds of matches, by which time all clubs had played each other three times, the league split into a 'top six' and 'bottom six' with clubs only competing against teams within their own section for the final five fixtures. Points achieved during the first phase of 33 matches were carried forward to the second phase but after the first phase was completed, clubs cannot move out of their own section in the league, even if they achieved more or fewer points than a higher or lower ranked team, respectively. The new format received widespread criticism from SPL managers.

Results in European competition over the previous five years saw the league move up from 21st to 15th in the UEFA country coefficient ranking. This meant that the league was granted an additional berth in the UEFA Champions League qualifying rounds for the following season.

== Teams ==
Twelve clubs competed in the league, all of the participants in the 1999–2000 Scottish Premier League and the top two clubs in the 1999–2000 Scottish First Division. A play-off was due to take place between the bottom club of the Premier League (Aberdeen) and the second- and third-placed club of the First Division (Dunfermline Athletic and Falkirk, respectively), but as Falkirk's stadium did not meet the minimum SPL seating requirements, this play-off did not take place, and Aberdeen and Dunfermline were automatically placed in the Premier League.

St Mirren were promoted to the league as champions of the 1999–2000 First Division, securing the championship on 29 April 2000 with a 3–0 victory over Raith Rovers at Love Street. This was to be their first season at the top level of Scottish football since 1991–92.

=== Stadia and locations ===
Aberdeen	Celtic	Dundee	Dundee United
Pittodrie Stadium	Celtic Park	Dens Park	Tannadice Park
Capacity: 20,866	Capacity: 60,411	Capacity: 11,506	Capacity: 14,223
Dunfermline Athletic	Location of teams in 2000–01 Scottish Premier League		Heart of Midlothian
East End Park	Location of teams in 2000–01 Scottish Premier League		Tynecastle Park
Capacity: 12,509	Location of teams in 2000–01 Scottish Premier League		Capacity: 17,420
Hibernian	Location of teams in 2000–01 Scottish Premier League		Kilmarnock
Easter Road	Location of teams in 2000–01 Scottish Premier League		Rugby Park
Capacity: 16,531	Location of teams in 2000–01 Scottish Premier League		Capacity: 17,889
Motherwell	Rangers	St Johnstone	St Mirren
Fir Park	Ibrox Stadium	McDiarmid Park	Love Street
Capacity: 13,677	Capacity: 50,817	Capacity: 10,696	Capacity: 10,800

=== Personnel and kits ===
Team	Manager	Kit manufacturer	Kit sponsor
Aberdeen	(Denmark) Ebbe Skovdahl	Puma	Atlantic Telecom
Celtic	(Northern Ireland) Martin O'Neill	Umbro	ntl:
Dundee	(Italy) Ivano Bonetti	Xara	Ceramic Tile Warehouse
Dundee United	(Scotland) Alex Smith	TFG Sports	Telewest
Dunfermline Athletic	(Scotland) Jimmy Calderwood	TFG Sports	Auto Windscreens
Heart of Midlothian	(Scotland) Craig Levein	Erreà	Strongbow
Hibernian	(Scotland) Alex McLeish	Le Coq Sportif	Carlsberg
Kilmarnock	(Scotland) Bobby Williamson	Puma	scotlandonline.com
Motherwell	(Scotland) Billy Davies	Xara	Motorola
Rangers	(Netherlands) Dick Advocaat	Nike	ntl:
St Johnstone	(Scotland) Sandy Clark	Xara	Scottish Hydro Electric
St Mirren	(Scotland) Tom Hendrie	Xara	LDV Group

==== Managerial changes ====
Team	Outgoing manager	Date of vacancy	Manner of departure	Position in table	Incoming manager	Date of appointment
Celtic	(Scotland) Kenny Dalglish	1 June 2000	Caretaker spell ended	Pre-season	(Northern Ireland) Martin O'Neill	1 June 2000
Dundee	(Scotland) Jocky Scott	10 July 2000	Contract expired	Pre-season	(Italy) Ivano Bonetti	10 July 2000
Dundee United	(Scotland) Paul Sturrock	7 August 2000	Resigned	12th	(Scotland) Alex Smith	8 August 2000
Heart of Midlothian	(Scotland) Jim Jefferies	8 November 2000	Mutual consent	5th	(Scotland) Craig Levein	1 December 2000

== Overview ==
The 2000–01 title was won by Celtic – their first SPL title, and their first Scottish title since winning the 1997–98 Premier Division – in Martin O'Neill's first season as manager of the club. Celtic also went on to win the 2000–01 Scottish Cup and the 2000–01 Scottish League Cup, completing a domestic treble. Henrik Larsson won the 2000–01 European Golden Shoe for his goalscoring, scoring 35 league goals and 53 goals in all competitions over the course of the season. The 35 goals Larsson scored in the league this season was a Scottish Premier League record.

Defending champions Rangers finished second, 15 points behind their Old Firm-rivals. Celtic secured their title on 7 April 2001, with a 1–0 victory over St Mirren at Celtic Park. The aforementioned match had the highest attendance of any match in SPL history. As champions, Celtic qualified for the Champions League, as did second-placed Rangers. Third-placed Hibernian and fourth-placed Kilmarnock qualified for the UEFA Cup, while Dundee became the first SPL club – and the first Scottish club since Partick Thistle in 1995 – to qualify for the UEFA Intertoto Cup.

The record for the highest transfer fee ever paid by a Scottish club was broken twice over the course of the season. Firstly, by Chris Sutton's transfer from Chelsea to Celtic on 10 July 2000 for £6 million. Then, on 23 November 2000, the £12 million fee paid by Rangers to Chelsea for Tore André Flo became the highest transfer fee ever paid by a Scottish club, and is a record which still stands as of 2025. The signing of Claudio Caniggia for Dundee in October 2000 was also seen by many as a major coup for the club, and was just one of many signings of international players made under the management of Ivano Bonetti.

St Mirren were relegated in what was their debut season in the SPL and their first appearance in Scotland's top division since 1991–92. Their relegation was mathematically confirmed on the final day of the season with a 3–3 draw against Motherwell, leaving them five points below 11th-placed Dundee United.

== League table ==
Pos	Team	Pld	W	D	L	GF	GA	GD	Pts	Qualification or relegation (Note: Teams played each other three times (33 matches), before the league split into two groups (the top six and the bottom six) for the last five matches.)
1	Celtic (C)	38	31	4	3	90	29	+61	97	Qualification for the Champions League third qualifying round
2	Rangers	38	26	4	8	76	36	+40	82	Qualification for the Champions League second qualifying round
3	Hibernian	38	18	12	8	57	35	+22	66	Qualification for the UEFA Cup first round
4	Kilmarnock	38	15	9	14	44	53	−9	54	Qualification for the UEFA Cup qualifying round (Note: As both finalists of the 2000–01 Scottish Cup, Celtic and Hibernian, qualified for European competition via their league position, the cup berth for 2001–02 UEFA Cup was passed to the next-placed team in the league, fourth-placed Kilmarnock.)
5	Heart of Midlothian	38	14	10	14	56	50	+6	52	
6	Dundee	38	13	8	17	51	49	+2	47	Qualification for the UEFA Intertoto Cup first round (Note: Dundee qualified for the 2001 UEFA Intertoto Cup as the highest-placed team to apply for a place in the competition.)
7	Aberdeen	38	11	12	15	45	52	−7	45	
8	Motherwell	38	12	7	19	42	56	−14	43	
9	Dunfermline Athletic	38	11	9	18	34	54	−20	42	
10	St Johnstone	38	9	13	16	40	56	−16	40	
11	Dundee United	38	9	8	21	38	63	−25	35	
12	St Mirren (R)	38	8	6	24	32	72	−40	30	Relegation to the First Division

Source: Scottish Professional Football League
Rules for classification: 1) Points; 2) Goal difference; 3) Goals scored
(C) Champions; (R) Relegated

== Results ==
=== Matches 1–22 ===
During matches 1–22 each team played every other team twice (home and away).

Home \ Away	ABE	CEL	DND	DUN	DNF	HOM	HIB	KIL	MOT	RAN	STJ	STM
Aberdeen		1–1	0–2	4–1	0–0	1–1	0–2	1–2	3–3	1–2	1–1	2–1
Celtic	6–0		1–0	2–1	3–1	6–1	3–0	2–1	1–0	6–2	4–1	2–0
Dundee	2–2	1–2		3–0	3–0	1–1	1–2	0–0	1–2	1–1	1–1	5–0
Dundee United	3–5	1–2	0–2		3–2	0–4	0–1	0–1	1–1	1–1	1–2	0–0
Dunfermline Athletic	0–0	1–2	1–0	1–0		1–0	1–1	1–0	1–2	0–0	1–1	2–0
Heart of Midlothian	3–0	2–4	3–1	3–1	2–0		0–0	0–2	3–0	0–1	0–3	2–0
Hibernian	0–2	0–0	5–1	3–0	3–0	6–2		1–1	2–0	1–0	2–0	2–0
Kilmarnock	1–0	0–1	2–3	1–0	2–1	0–3	0–1		3–2	2–4	0–2	2–1
Motherwell	1–1	3–3	0–2	2–1	0–1	2–0	1–3	1–2		0–1	4–0	2–0
Rangers	3–1	5–1	0–2	3–0	4–1	1–0	1–0	0–3	2–0		2–1	7–1
St Johnstone	0–0	0–2	0–0	1–0	0–2	2–2	0–3	1–1	2–3	2–1		2–0
St Mirren	2–0	0–2	2–1	1–1	2–1	1–2	1–1	0–1	0–1	1–3	0–1	

Source: Soccerbase
Legend: Blue = home team win; Yellow = draw; Red = away team win.

=== Matches 23–33 ===
During matches 23–33 each team played every other team once (either at home or away). This means that during matches 1-33 each team played every other team 3 times (either 1 home, 2 away or 2 home, 1 away).

Home \ Away	ABE	CEL	DND	DUN	DNF	HOM	HIB	KIL	MOT	RAN	STJ	STM
Aberdeen		0–1	0–2			1–0	1–0				3–3	3–0
Celtic			2–1				1–1	6–0	1–0	1–0		1–0
Dundee				2–3	0–1	0–0		2–2		0–1		
Dundee United	1–1	0–4				1–1			2–0		1–1	4–0
Dunfermline Athletic	3–2	0–3		3–1			2–1				0–0	
Heart of Midlothian		0–3			7–1		1–1	3–0	3–0			1–0
Hibernian			3–0	1–0					1–1	0–0		4–2
Kilmarnock	0–0			0–0	2–1		1–1		1–2	1–2		
Motherwell	0–1		0–3		1–1					1–2	1–0	
Rangers	1–0			0–2	2–0	2–0					3–0	
St Johnstone		1–2	2–3			2–2	2–0	1–2				
St Mirren			2–1		1–1			1–3	0–1	1–3	1–0	

Source: Soccerbase
Legend: Blue = home team win; Yellow = draw; Red = away team win.

=== Matches 34–38 ===
During matches 34–38 each team played every other team in their half of the table once (either at home or away).

==== Top six ====
Home \ Away	CEL	DND	HOM	HIB	KIL	RAN
Celtic		0–2	1–0			
Dundee				0–2	2–1	0–3
Heart of Midlothian		2–0				1–4
Hibernian	2–5		0–0		1–1	
Kilmarnock	1–0		1–1			
Rangers	0–3			4–0	5–1	

Source: Soccerbase
Legend: Blue = home team win; Yellow = draw; Red = away team win.

==== Bottom Six ====
Home \ Away	ABE	DUN	DNF	MOT	STJ	STM
Aberdeen		1–2	1–0			
Dundee United			1–0	1–0		
Dunfermline Athletic				1–2	0–0	1–2
Motherwell	0–2				0–1	3–3
St Johnstone	0–3	2–3				2–2
St Mirren	2–1	2–1				

Source: Soccerbase
Legend: Blue = home team win; Yellow = draw; Red = away team win.

== Top scorers ==
Player	Club	Goals
(Sweden) Henrik Larsson	Celtic	35
(Norway) Arild Stavrum	Aberdeen	17
(Argentina) Juan Sara	Dundee	15
(Northern Ireland) Andy Kirk	Hearts	13
(Northern Ireland) Stuart Elliott	Motherwell	12
(Scotland) Colin Cameron	Hearts	12
(Norway) Tore André Flo	Rangers	11
(Finland) Mixu Paatelainen	Hibernian	11
(England) Chris Sutton	Celtic	11
(France) David Zitelli	Hibernian	10
(Scotland) Ricky Gillies	St Mirren	10
(Scotland) Keigan Parker	St Johnstone	10

Source: SPL official website

== Attendances ==
The average attendances for SPL clubs during the 2000/01 season are shown below:

Team	Average
Celtic	59,369
Rangers	47,532
Hearts	12,771
Aberdeen	12,403
Hibernian	10,792
Kilmarnock	8,223
Dundee	8,041
Dundee United	7,829
Dunfermline Athletic	6,413
Motherwell	6,208
St Mirren	5,838
St Johnstone	5,438

Source: SPL official website

== Awards ==
=== Monthly awards ===
Month	Manager	Player
August	(Northern Ireland) Martin O'Neill (Celtic)	(Scotland) Andy McLaren (Kilmarnock)
September	(Scotland) Bobby Williamson (Kilmarnock)	(Sweden) Henrik Larsson (Celtic)
October	(Scotland) Alex McLeish (Hibernian)	(Finland) Mixu Paatelainen (Hibernian)
November	(Scotland) Billy Davies (Motherwell)	(Scotland) Barry Ferguson (Rangers)
December	(Northern Ireland) Martin O'Neill (Celtic)	(Sweden) Henrik Larsson (Celtic)
January	None awarded due to winter break.	
February	(Northern Ireland) Martin O'Neill (Celtic)	(Argentina) Claudio Caniggia (Dundee)
March	(Scotland) Alex Smith (Dundee United)	(Northern Ireland) Neil Lennon (Celtic)
April	(Scotland) Tom Hendrie (St Mirren)	(Finland) Antti Niemi (Hearts)
May	(Scotland) Alex Smith (Dundee United)	(Germany) Jörg Albertz (Rangers)

=== Awards ===
- Player awards

Award	Winner	Club
PFA Players' Player of the Year	(Sweden) Henrik Larsson	Celtic
PFA Young Player of the Year	(Bulgaria) Stiliyan Petrov	Celtic
SFWA Footballer of the Year	(Sweden) Henrik Larsson	Celtic

- Manager awards

Award	Winner	Club
SFWA Manager of the Year	(Northern Ireland) Martin O'Neill	Celtic

== See also ==
- 2000–01 Celtic F.C. season
- 2000–01 Rangers F.C. season
- Dundee United FC Season 2000-01
