= Jim Rodger =

Scottish footballer (1933–2024)

James McPhail Rodger (15 September 1933 – 3 May 2024) was a Scottish footballer. An inside forward and a right winger, Rodger played for Rangers, St Mirren, Newport County, Hearts, Queen of the South and East Fife. During his football career, Rodger taught Maths at Hamilton Academy and moving from St Mirren to Hearts at this time. He later became Headmaster at Portree High School. He died on 3 May 2024, at the age of 90.
