= Stevie Mallan (footballer, born 1996) =

Scottish footballer

Personal information
- Full name: Stephen Patrick Mallan
- Date of birth: 25 March 1996 (age 30)
- Place of birth: Glasgow, Scotland
- Height: 1.80 m (5 ft 11 in)
- Position: Midfielder

Team information
- Current team: St Johnstone
- Number: 22

Youth career
- St Mirren

Senior career*
Years	Team	Apps	(Gls)
2014–2017	St Mirren	93	(22)
2017–2018	Barnsley	8	(0)
2018–2021	Hibernian	71	(11)
2021	→ Yeni Malatyaspor (loan)	17	(2)
2021–2022	Yeni Malatyaspor	18	(0)
2022–2024	Salford City	31	(3)
2025–	St Johnstone	13	(2)

International career
2017–2018	Scotland U21	9	(1)
- * Club domestic league appearances and goals as of 4 May 2026

Stephen Patrick Mallan (born 25 March 1996) is a Scottish professional footballer who plays for Scottish Premiership club St Johnstone. Mallan has previously played for St Mirren, Barnsley, Hibernian, Yeni Malatyaspor and Salford City. He has also represented Scotland in under-21 internationals.

== Club career ==
=== St Mirren ===
Born in Glasgow, he was included in St Mirren's matchday squad for the first time on 18 October 2014, remaining on the substitutes' bench as they lost 0–1 at home against Inverness Caledonian Thistle in the Scottish Premiership. On 8 November, he was again unused as they lost by the same score against Partick Thistle, again at St Mirren Park. His debut came two weeks later as St Mirren lost 3–0 away to Hamilton Academical, starting and making way for James Marwood after 68 minutes.

Mallan scored his first goal on his fifth appearance, the team's second in a 3–1 away win against Dundee at Dens Park. BBC Sport described the goal as a "contender for goal of the season". Mallan was subsequently presented with the PFA Scotland 'Goal of the Season' award for that effort. Mallan also won the SPFL Young Player of the Month award for December 2014. Eight days later he scored his second goal, the 87th-minute winner in a 2–1 victory at Ross County. Later in January, Mallan signed a three-year contract extension with St Mirren. He scored a late winning goal against Motherwell on 16 May, but St Mirren had already been relegated to the Championship.

On 25 August 2015, Mallan equalised with a 25-yard free kick in first-half added time in a Scottish League Cup second-round game against Livingston, but his team lost 2–3 at home. He scored twice in a 4–0 win over Dunfermline Athletic on 10 October to send his team into the semi-finals of the 2015–16 Scottish Challenge Cup.

In October 2016 at Easter Road, he scored a "magnificent" free kick from 30 yards to help St Mirren eliminate Hibernian from the Challenge Cup. Mallan left St Mirren after the 2016–17 season, having made over 100 appearances for the club.

=== Barnsley ===
On 18 May 2017 Mallan completed a transfer to EFL Championship side Barnsley for an undisclosed fee. He made his competitive debut against Preston North End on Boxing Day in a 0–0 draw. Mallan made only nine appearances for Barnsley during the 2017–18 season, as they were relegated to EFL League One.

=== Hibernian ===
Mallan returned to Scottish football in July 2018, moving to Premiership club Hibernian for an undisclosed fee on a 4-year contract. He made his debut for the club on 12 July in a 2018–19 UEFA Europa League qualification tie at home to Faroese side NSÍ Runavík, scoring twice in a 6–1 Hibs win. Mallan had a productive first season with Hibs, scoring 13 goals in 48 appearances. After 3 goals in 26 appearances during the first part of the 2019–20 season, he suffered a knee injury in late December.

=== Yeni Malatyaspor ===
Mallan was loaned to Turkish Super Lig club Yeni Malatyaspor for the rest of the season, with an option to buy at the end of the season, on 1 February 2021. In July, Mallan moved on a permanent basis to Malatyaspor, signing a two-year contract with the club.

=== Salford City ===
On 30 June 2022, Mallan returned to England to join League Two club Salford City on a two-year deal. On 21 May 2024, the club announced he would be leaving in the summer when his contract expired.

=== St Johnstone ===
Mallan signed a one-year deal with St Johnstone on 18 July 2025, with an option to extend for another year.

== International career ==
In March 2017, he made his debut for the Scotland under-21 side in a friendly against Estonia.

== Personal life ==
Stevie is the latest of four generations of Mallan men to play football at a high level. His great-grandfather Jim or Jimmy, a defender, played for Celtic and St Mirren, being selected for the Scottish Football League XI with the former and playing in the 1955 Scottish League Cup Final with the latter. His grandfather, also Jimmy, played Junior football as a striker, scoring a hat-trick for Johnstone Burgh in the 1964 Scottish Junior Cup final. His father Stevie, a striker born in 1967, played mainly for Queen of the South in the Nineties, as well as a few other Scottish League clubs. After moving to the Juniors in his mid Thirties, he played for several more years and appeared in the 2011 Scottish Junior Cup Final at the age of 44.

== Career statistics ==
As of 31 March 2023

Appearances and goals by club, season and competition
Club	Season	League			National cup (Note: Includes Scottish Cup, FA Cup, Turkish Cup)		League cup (Note: Includes Scottish League Cup)		Other		Total	
Club	Season	Division	Apps	Goals	Apps	Goals	Apps	Goals	Apps	Goals	Apps	Goals
St Mirren	2014–15	Scottish Premiership	25	4	0	0	0	0	—		25	4
St Mirren	2015–16	Scottish Championship	34	11	1	0	1	1	4 (Note: Appearances in Scottish Challenge Cup)	2	40	14
St Mirren	2016–17	Scottish Championship	34	7	4	1	4	0	5	3	47	11
St Mirren	Total		93	22	5	1	5	1	9	5	112	29
Barnsley	2017–18	EFL Championship	8	0	1	0	0	0	—		9	0
Hibernian	2018–19	Scottish Premiership	37	7	3	1	2	1	6 (Note: Appearances in UEFA Europa League)	4	48	13
Hibernian	2019–20	Scottish Premiership	20	3	1	0	6	0	—		27	3
Hibernian	2020–21	Scottish Premiership	14	1	0	0	6	3	—		20	4
Hibernian	Total		71	11	4	1	14	4	6	4	95	20
Yeni Malatyaspor (loan)	2020–21	Turkish Süper Lig	17	2	0	0	—		—		17	2
Yeni Malatyaspor	2021–22	Turkish Süper Lig	18	0	1	0	—		—		19	0
Yeni Malatyaspor	Total		35	2	1	0	0	0	0	0	36	2
Salford City	2022–23	EFL League Two	7	3	0	0	0	0	0	0	7	3
Career total			214	38	11	2	19	5	15	9	259	54

== Honours ==
St Johnstone

- Scottish Championship: 2025–26
