= Bobby Holmes =

Scottish footballer (1932–2026)

Personal information
- Date of birth: 25 July 1932
- Place of birth: Coatbridge, Scotland
- Date of death: 4 January 2026 (aged 93)
- Place of death: Erskine, Renfrewshire, Scotland
- Position: Inside forward

Senior career*
Years	Team	Apps	(Gls)
- Kilsyth Rangers
1954–1959	St Mirren	84	(22)

International career
1955	Scotland U23	1	(0)
1957	Scottish Football League XI	1	(0)
- * Club domestic league appearances and goals

Bobby Holmes (25 July 1932 – 4 January 2026) was a Scottish footballer who played as an inside forward for St Mirren in the Scottish Football League.

Holmes played once for the Scottish Football League XI, in 1957. He was forced to retire in 1959 due to injury.

Holmes died on 4 January 2026, at the age of 93.
