= 1958–59 Scottish Division One =

53rd season of top-tier football league in Scotland

Scottish Division One
- Season: 1958–59
- Champions: Rangers
- Relegated: Falkirk; Queen of the South

The 1958–59 Scottish Division One was won by Rangers by two points over nearest rival Hearts. Falkirk and Queen of the South finished 17th and 18th respectively and were relegated to the 1959–60 Scottish Division Two.

The last day of the season saw Rangers holding a 2-point lead over Hearts, with the clubs having an identical goal average. Rangers lost 1–2 at home to Aberdeen. Hearts could have won the league on goal average with a win away to Celtic, but instead lost 2–1.

== League table ==
Pos	Team	Pld	W	D	L	GF	GA	GR	Pts
1	Rangers	34	21	8	5	92	51	1.804	50
2	Heart of Midlothian	34	21	6	7	92	51	1.804	48
3	Motherwell	34	18	8	8	83	50	1.660	44
4	Dundee	34	16	9	9	61	51	1.196	41
5	Airdrieonians	34	15	7	12	64	62	1.032	37
6	Celtic	34	14	8	12	70	53	1.321	36
7	St Mirren	34	14	7	13	71	74	0.959	35
8	Kilmarnock	34	13	8	13	58	51	1.137	34
9	Partick Thistle	34	14	6	14	59	66	0.894	34
10	Hibernian	34	13	6	15	68	70	0.971	32
11	Third Lanark	34	11	10	13	74	83	0.892	32
12	Stirling Albion	34	11	8	15	54	64	0.844	30
13	Aberdeen	34	12	5	17	63	66	0.955	29
14	Raith Rovers	34	10	9	15	60	70	0.857	29
15	Clyde	34	12	4	18	62	66	0.939	28
16	Dunfermline Athletic	34	10	8	16	68	87	0.782	28
17	Falkirk	34	10	7	17	58	79	0.734	27
18	Queen of the South	34	6	6	22	38	101	0.376	18

Source: RSSSF

== Results ==
Home \ Away	ABE	AIR	CEL	CLY	DND	DNF	FAL	HOM	HIB	KIL	MOT	PAR	QOS	RAI	RAN	STM	STI	THI
Aberdeen		0–1	3–1	1–2	1–1	4–0	5–0	2–4	4–0	2–2	0–4	3–4	5–0	2–2	1–3	2–1	4–1	3–3
Airdrieonians	2–1		1–4	2–1	1–1	2–1	2–2	2–3	4–3	3–0	1–5	1–2	0–1	4–0	5–4	4–2	0–1	1–1
Celtic	4–0	1–2		3–1	1–1	3–1	3–4	2–1	3–0	2–0	3–3	2–0	3–1	3–1	2–2	3–3	7–3	3–1
Clyde	4–0	0–2	2–1		3–2	2–5	3–2	2–2	4–1	2–4	2–0	0–3	3–0	4–1	1–4	2–3	2–3	1–2
Dundee	2–1	1–1	1–1	2–1		2–2	3–2	3–3	2–1	1–0	1–1	3–2	2–1	2–0	1–3	4–6	3–0	3–0
Dunfermline Athletic	1–1	2–1	1–0	2–4	2–1		4–1	3–3	1–2	0–3	0–4	10–1	4–2	3–3	1–7	2–3	3–2	2–3
Falkirk	5–1	1–2	3–2	1–4	2–5	0–2		0–2	1–0	0–0	1–1	0–2	4–0	2–2	5–5	3–4	2–1	2–0
Heart of Midlothian	5–1	4–3	1–1	2–2	1–3	6–2	5–1		1–3	3–1	0–2	2–0	2–1	2–1	2–0	4–0	1–4	8–3
Hibernian	1–0	2–3	3–2	2–1	1–2	3–1	2–3	0–4		4–3	2–2	4–0	4–0	4–2	2–2	0–1	0–1	4–4
Kilmarnock	2–0	4–2	1–4	4–1	1–0	1–1	4–1	3–2	1–1		1–3	1–2	5–0	2–0	0–3	1–0	3–3	4–0
Motherwell	2–0	5–2	2–0	1–0	2–0	1–0	1–0	0–1	2–5	1–1		3–1	6–1	3–3	2–2	2–2	3–0	8–1
Partick Thistle	2–3	1–3	2–0	1–0	3–0	3–3	3–1	2–1	2–2	1–1	4–0		2–3	1–3	2–0	3–1	1–5	1–1
Queen of the South	2–1	0–2	2–2	2–1	1–3	2–3	2–1	0–5	1–4	2–2	0–5	1–0		1–1	3–6	2–2	1–1	2–5
Raith Rovers	0–1	3–0	3–1	1–0	4–1	2–2	1–0	0–5	5–2	1–0	3–0	2–2	2–1		2–2	2–1	0–1	2–4
Rangers	1–2	2–1	2–1	3–1	1–2	1–0	3–0	5–0	4–0	1–0	2–1	2–1	3–1	4–4		2–1	3–0	2–2
St Mirren	1–5	3–3	1–0	1–3	2–2	6–2	1–2	1–1	2–1	0–2	4–1	4–3	1–1	3–1	1–3		3–2	4–1
Stirling Albion	3–2	0–0	0–1	2–1	0–1	1–1	1–1	1–2	0–3	3–1	2–5	1–1	4–0	2–1	2–2	3–0		2–3
Third Lanark	0–2	1–1	1–1	2–2	0–3	7–1	3–3	0–4	2–2	2–0	5–2	0–1	7–1	3–2	2–3	2–3	3–0	

Legend: Blue = home team win; Yellow = draw; Red = away team win.
