= Tommy Gemmell (footballer, born 1930) =

Scottish footballer

Personal information
- Full name: Thomas Gemmell
- Date of birth: 2 July 1930
- Place of birth: Tarbolton, Ayrshire, Scotland
- Date of death: 8 January 2004 (aged 73)
- Place of death: Patna, Ayrshire, Scotland
- Position: Inside forward

Youth career
- –1951: Irvine Meadow

Senior career*
Years	Team	Apps	(Gls)
1951–1962	St Mirren	264	(71)

International career
1952	Scotland B	1	(0)
1955	Scotland B vs A trial	1	(1)
1955	Scotland	2	(1)
1958	Scottish League XI	1	(1)
- * Club domestic league appearances and goals

Tommy Gemmell (2 July 1930 – 8 January 2004) was a Scottish footballer, who played as an inside forward for St Mirren for his whole senior career. Gemmell, who made over 250 league appearances for the club, helped St Mirren win the 1959 Scottish Cup Final.

He also played for the Scotland national football team twice in May 1955, scoring one goal.

== See also ==
- List of one-club men
