= Jim Mallan =

Scottish footballer (1924–1969)

Personal information
- Date of birth: 25 January 1924
- Place of birth: Govanhill, Scotland
- Date of death: 27 May 1969 (aged 45)
- Position: Right back

Senior career*
Years	Team	Apps	(Gls)
- Pollok
1942–1953	Celtic	90	(0)
1953–1956	St Mirren	65	(0)
Total		155	(0)

International career
1949	Scottish League XI	1	(0)
- * Club domestic league appearances and goals

James Mallan (25 January 1924 – 27 May 1969) was a Scottish footballer who played for Celtic and St Mirren as a defender.

== Career ==
Having joined Celtic as a teenager, his time at the club coincided with one of the poorest eras in their history in terms of performances and trophies. He did win the Glasgow Cup in 1948–49, and had also featured regularly for four seasons during World War II which are not counted as official matches. At the end of that period he was sent off in a controversial 1946 Victory Cup match against Rangers which led to a lengthy suspension from the Scottish Football Association, so he was not able to make his Scottish Football League debut until December 1946.

He was selected for the Scottish League XI once, in 1949, but was criticised for his performance in a 3–0 defeat to the Football League XI, which he felt was unjust.

At St Mirren, he was responsible for scoring an own goal in the 1955 Scottish League Cup Final against Aberdeen, who went on to win the match 2–1. He retired from playing at the end of the season, and later ran a public house in Paisley. He died in 1969, aged 45.

== Personal life ==
Jimmy was the first of four generations of Mallan men to play football to a high level. His son, also Jimmy, played Junior football as a striker, scoring a hat-trick for Johnstone Burgh in the 1964 Scottish Junior Cup final. His grandson Stevie, a striker born in 1967, played for several Scottish Football League clubs in the 1990s, and after moving to Junior football in his mid-30s, played for several more years and appeared in the 2011 Scottish Junior Cup Final at the age of 44. His great-grandson, also Stevie, born in 1996, made his debut as a midfielder for St Mirren in November 2014 and played 100 games for the club before moving to England, later signing for Hibernian.
