= David Lapsley =

Scottish footballer

Personal information
- Date of birth: 7 April 1924
- Place of birth: Kirkintilloch, Scotland
- Date of death: 15 January 2001 (aged 76)
- Positions: Centre forward; right back

Senior career*
| Years | Team | Apps | (Gls) |
| 1945–1946 | Tranmere Rovers | 0 | (0) |
| 1946–1959 | St Mirren | 303 | (46) |
| Total | | 303 | (46) |

International career
| 1951–1954 | Scottish Football League XI | 2 | (1) |
- * Club domestic league appearances and goals

David Lapsley (7 April 1924 – 15 January 2001) was a Scottish footballer.

== Schoolboy career and World War II ==
Bainsford School in Falkirk were first to be rewarded with Lapsley's footballing talents and the highlight of this stage of his early football days was the trial with the Scottish schoolboys side. He went on to play with Bonnyrigg Rose at a juvenile level before, in 1940, taking the junior route to Bathgate Thistle. World War II prevented any further advance in Lapsley's career as he was called up for service with the Royal Navy, stationed initially at Birkenhead then Hayling Island. During the war he was involved in the D-Day landings, stationed on a converted Thames barge to ferry ammunition across the English Channel.

== St Mirren ==
Lapsey started his senior footballing career with Tranmere Rovers after returning home from service in the Navy at the end of World War II. Lapsley signed for St Mirren in the summer of 1946 almost by accident; he was visiting Scotland when the St Mirren manager at the time, Bobby Rankin, invited him for a trial, although he was due to join Everton on a months trial on his return to England. The trial consisted of him taking penalty kicks against a young goalkeeper, Gordon Rennie, and on the basis of this he was invited to the boardroom to sign right away. He made his first team debut on 4 September that year against Partick Thistle. Lapsley was originally signed as a centre forward but quickly established himself as a right back and was well known in Paisley for his strong, committed approach to the game, and was more recently compared to modern-day footballer Jörg Albertz for the directness of his free-kicks and penalties. With every penalty, Lapsley would get one of his strikers to place the ball on the spot before he would start his 30 or 40-yard run-up to strike the ball with blistering power.

During his time with the Paisley club he captained them to an historic 1959 Scottish Cup Final win, the team defeating Aberdeen 3–1 in front of 108,951 supporters and after the final whistle his teammates carried him shoulder high from the pitch. Along with his 1959 Scottish Cup winning shirt and medal on permanent display in the Scottish Football Museum at Hampden Park, there is also footage of Lapsley after the 1959 Scottish Cup win talking to a mass crowd, gathered in Paisleys' County Square, from the balcony of The Paisley Council Chamber where he builds the excitement in the crowd by asking "Who was it that won the Cup?", with the crowd rapturously and loudly responding "St Mirren!" . Towards the latter end of his career with St Mirren, Lapsley was on a part-time contract whilst working through the week as a tanker driver for BP, and although he vowed to retire after the 1959 Scottish Cup, he did play one more match at the beginning of the following season when they beat Greenock Morton in the Renfrewshire Cup Final.

== Legacy ==
In 2005, St Mirren officially inducted David Lapsley into their hall of fame. Lapsley was further honoured in 2008 when local councillor George Adam, who is a Saints supporter, elected to name a new street in his ward after the St Mirren legend, and as a result Lapsley Avenue was commissioned.

Lapsley was also chosen to represent the Scottish Football League XI twice, playing against the Irish League XI and the (English) Football League select team, getting on the scoresheet in a 3–0 win against the former. He was also selected by Scotland on more than twenty occasions as understudy to Rangers captain George Young, but Lapsley never played for his country. Following Lapsley's death, a one-minute silence was held in his memory at the Scottish Cup tie between St Mirren and Motherwell on 27 January 2001. His ashes were ceremoniously buried under the penalty spot at the home end of Love Street.
