= Hugh Baird (footballer) =

Scottish footballer

Personal information
- Full name: Hugh Baird
- Date of birth: 14 March 1930
- Place of birth: Bellshill, Scotland
- Date of death: 19 June 2006 (aged 76)
- Place of death: Aberdeen, Scotland
- Position: Centre forward

Youth career
- Dalry Thistle

Senior career*
Years	Team	Apps	(Gls)
1951–1957	Airdrieonians	134	(111)
1957–1958	Leeds United	45	(22)
1958–1962	Aberdeen	66	(21)
1962	Brechin City	0	(0)
1962–1963	Deveronvale		
1963–1966	Rothes		
Total		245	(154)

International career
1956	Scotland	1	(0)
- * Club domestic league appearances and goals

Hugh Baird (14 March 1930 – 19 June 2006) was a Scottish footballer, who played for Airdrieonians, Leeds United and Aberdeen. He also represented the Scotland national football team on one occasion against Austria at Hampden Park, Glasgow.

Baird started his professional playing career aged 21 with Scottish Football League side Airdrieonians, whom he joined from Dalry Thistle. A striker, he quickly gained a reputation as a prolific goal scorer. In 1957, Leeds United signed him for £12,000 but he only stayed one season in England. In 1958 Aberdeen paid a then-club-record transfer fee of £11,500 to ensure his return north. He stayed with Aberdeen until 1962, making 86 appearances for the Dons.

Baird continued playing football for another five years following his departure from Pittodrie, enjoying a very brief spell with Brechin City and not featuring in the Brechin first team, before moving into the Highland Football League for longer spells with Deveronvale FC, the Banff Highland League Club, followed by a three-year spell at Rothes FC on Speyside, Morayshire, before retiring from football at age 36 to become a bricklayer. Both Highland League clubs were within a convenient rail commuting distance from his home in Aberdeen where he had settled following his transfer from Leeds United, and where he lived with his family until his death in June 2006 at the age of 76.

Baird made one appearance for the Scotland national side in May 1956 at Hampden Park against Austria. He only received an international cap in 2006, after a successful campaign was started by Gary Imlach calling for his father and other affected players (including Baird) to receive caps. Until the early 1970s, the SFA did not award caps to players for matches other than those in the British Home Championship.

== Career statistics ==
=== Club ===
Club	Seasons	League			Scottish Cup		League Cup		Europe		Total	
Club	Seasons	Division	Apps	Goals	Apps	Goals	Apps	Goals	Apps	Goals	Apps	Goals
Aberdeen	1958–59	Scottish Division One	25	12	5	2	0	0	0	0	30	14
Aberdeen	1959–60	Scottish Division One	28	5	3	0	5	1	0	0	36	6
Aberdeen	1960–61	Scottish Division One	8	0	0	0	1	0	0	0	9	0
Aberdeen	1961–62	Scottish Division One	5	4	0	0	6	1	0	0	11	5
Aberdeen	Total		66	21	8	2	12	2	0	0	86	25

=== International ===
Appearances and goals by national team and year
National team	Year	Apps	Goals
Scotland	1956	1	0
Total		1	0
