= Ricky Gillies =

Scottish footballer

Personal information
- Date of birth: 24 August 1976 (age 50)
- Place of birth: Glasgow, Scotland
- Position: Midfielder

Youth career
- Barrhead Boys Club
- 1991–1992: St Mirren

Senior career*
Years	Team	Apps	(Gls)
1992–1997	St Mirren	108	(14)
1997–2000	Aberdeen	44	(1)
2000	→St Mirren (loan)	4	(0)
2000–2005	St Mirren	156	(33)
2005–2006	Partick Thistle	31	(0)
2006–2007	Hawke's Bay United	18	(0)
2007–2008	Stranraer	6	(2)
Total		367	(50)

International career
1996–1997	Scotland U21	7	(0)
- * Club domestic league appearances and goals

Richard Gillies (born 24 August 1976) is a Scottish former professional footballer. He had two five-year spells with St Mirren.

== Career ==
Raised in Neilston, Gillies played with Barrhead Boys Club up until the age of 15 when he signed for St Mirren. In December 1992, aged 16, he became the club's youngest debutant and goalscorer. An attacking midfielder, he was regarded as one of the most promising youngsters in the country when he came into the first team at St Mirren, then playing in Scotland's second tier. He was selected for the Scotland under-21 team and attracted interest from Liverpool and Newcastle United along with other clubs in both Scotland and England before a transfer to Aberdeen in 1997 for £350,000.

His move to the Dons was not a success, with the club in decline after a period as one of the strongest teams in Scottish football, while the manager who signed him (Roy Aitken) was dismissed within weeks of Gillies joining, and he suffered from several injuries and was abused in the street by frustrated supporters as his career stalled.

In 2000 he returned to St Mirren, initially on loan, soon followed by a permanent move after he helped the club win the First Division to achieve promotion to the Scottish Premier League, although they were relegated in 2001. He was inducted into the club's Hall of Fame when it was established in 2004, and awarded a testimonial against Celtic in 2005. He left for third-tier Partick Thistle later that year, spending one season with the Jags.

He spent a year as player-coach in New Zealand with Jonathan Gould at Hawke's Bay United before returning to Scotland for a short spell at Stranraer, retiring from playing in 2008.

== Later and personal life ==
Gillies later worked as a football agent, as a trainer for ProAcademy coaching and as Director of Operations for the ProLegal Group in conjunction with PFA Scotland.

His nephew Liam Lindsay is also a footballer, as was his elder brother Kenny, though without reaching the top division. His son Max was an emerging player with Queen's Park as of 2021.
