= Tommy Bryceland =

Scottish footballer and manager

Personal information
- Full name: Thomas Bryceland
- Date of birth: 1 March 1939
- Place of birth: Greenock, Scotland
- Date of death: 22 January 2016 (aged 76)
- Place of death: Ayrshire, Scotland
- Position: Forward

Senior career*
Years	Team	Apps	(Gls)
1956–1962	St Mirren	104	(47)
1962–1969	Norwich City	254	(49)
1969–1971	Oldham Athletic	67	(10)
1971–1972	St Mirren	14	(2)
Total		439	(108)

Managerial career
- 1972–1973: St Mirren
- * Club domestic league appearances and goals

Tommy Bryceland (1 March 1939 – 22 January 2016) was a Scottish football player and manager. He played for St Mirren, Norwich City and Oldham Athletic and then returned to St Mirren for a stint as player-manager.

A scheming inside-forward (attacking midfielder), Bryceland made his name at St Mirren where he won the Scottish Cup in 1959. He moved to Norwich City in 1962 and played 284 times for the Canaries, scoring 55 goals, between 1962 and 1969. His exploits won him a place as one of the fan nominees in the inaugural Norwich City Hall of Fame.

Bryceland's time at Norwich coincided with the club's stay in the second division, notably finishing 6th in 1965. He moved to Oldham Athletic in 1969, before returning to St Mirren as player-manager in 1971. His final scoring tally for St Mirren was 69 goals and he was inducted to the club's Hall of Fame in May 2007.
