= Mark Yardley =

Scottish footballer

Personal information
- Date of birth: 14 September 1969 (age 57)
- Place of birth: Livingston, West Lothian, Scotland
- Position: Striker

Senior career*
Years	Team	Apps	(Gls)
1988–1989	Cowdenbeath	6	(1)
1989–1994	Livingston United		
1994	East Fife (trialist)	1	(0)
1994–1995	Cowdenbeath	36	(25)
1995–2003	St Mirren	226	(68)
2001–2002	→ Forfar Athletic (loan)	4	(3)
2003–2005	Albion Rovers	52	(19)
Total		325	(558)
- * Club domestic league appearances and goals

Mark Yardley (born 14 September 1969) is a Scottish former professional footballer who played as a striker.

During his time with St Mirren, he scored 66 goals in 224 league appearances. He also had spells at Cowdenbeath, Forfar Athletic (loan) and Albion Rovers.

Yardley was one of four former players voted by St Mirren supporters to have a street named in his honour – Yardley Avenue – following a public competition run by Renfrewshire Council to name the streets at the former Love Street ground being developed by Sanctuary Scotland into affordable housing.

He appeared for St Mirren in a five-a-side Masters Football style tournament at Braehead in 2007 as part of Hugh Murray's Testimonial.
