= 66th Illinois Infantry Regiment =

66th Illinois Veteran Volunteer Infantry Regiment (Western Sharpshooters)
- Active: November 23, 1861, to July 7, 1865
- Country: United States
- Allegiance: Union
- Branch: Infantry (Sharpshooters)
- Equipment: Dimick Long Rifle and Henry Repeating Rifle
- Engagements: Battle of Mount Zion Church; Battle of Roan's Tan Yard (Silver Creek); Battle of Fort Donelson; Battle of Shiloh; Battle of Phillips Creek; Siege of Corinth; Battle of Iuka; Battle of Corinth; Hatchie River; Battle of Snake Creek Gap; Battle of Resaca; Battle of Lay's Ferry; Battle of Rome Cross Roads; Battle of New Hope Church; Battle of Dallas; Battle of Kennesaw Mountain; Battle of Ruff's Mill; Nickajack Creek; Battle of Atlanta; Siege of Atlanta; Battle of Lovejoy's Station; Battle of Jonesborough; March to the Sea; Battle of Eden Cross Roads; Second Battle of Fort McAllister; Carolinas campaign; Battle of Congaree Creek; Battle of Bentonville

The 66th Illinois Veteran Volunteer Infantry Regiment (Western Sharpshooters) (Note: By late December 1863, 470 Sharpshooters had reenlisted, far above the 3/4 percentage required to allow the unit to be awarded the "Veteran" designation.) (Note: The Regiment was officially allowed to maintain the WSS name as part of their official Illinois name after a request from Col Burke to Gov Yates: Illinois State Archives, Illinois Adjutant General's Office Civil War Records, Records Group 301.18, Burke letter of Jan 8, 1863) originally known as Birge's Western Sharpshooters and later as the "Western Sharpshooters-14th Missouri Volunteers", (Note: During the units Missouri incarnation, state officials allowed the "Western Sharpshooters" name to predominate in the unit title, using the WSS-14th MO arrangement in orders, official correspondence and Commissions: MO State Archives, Records of the Adjt Gen, Records Group 133) (Note: The Sharpshooters were never officially known by the WSS alone, they were mustered into Federal service as "Birge's WSS" and upon transfer to Missouri were informed that their new unit designation was: WSS-14th MO Vols.) was a specialized regiment of infantry sharpshooters that served in the Union Army during the American Civil War. The regiment was intended, raised, and mustered into Federal service as the Western Theater counterpart to Army of the Potomac's 1st and 2nd United States Volunteer Sharpshooters ("Berdan's Sharpshooters").

== Independent service ==
"Birge's Western Sharpshooters" was a multi-state, Federal unit organized at St. Louis, Missouri and mustered into federal service on November 23, 1861. Initially two companies were raised in Ohio, three in Illinois, one in Michigan, and four were organized at St Louis' Benton Barracks of Missourians and detachments of volunteer candidates sent by recruiting officers from Iowa, Minnesota and other western states, thus forming a regiment that represented every state in the west, a pet scheme of General John C. Fremont.

During the unit's existence it was re-designated first as the "Western Sharpshooters-14th Missouri Volunteers", and later re-designated again as the "66th Illinois Volunteer Infantry (Western Sharpshooters)". While federal and state authorities repeatedly changed the formal designation of the unit, the regiment was commonly referred to as the "Western Sharpshooters" (or simply "The Sharpshooters") for the duration of the war. After the war autographs by former members often included the appellation W.S.S.

Companies of the Western Sharpshooters

- "Welker's Company" (WSS's original Company A): Missouri men with some outstate members
- Company A: "Boyd's Company", Missouri and outstate members
- Company B: Missouri and outstate members
- Company C: Illinois (Bureau and Logan Counties) and some Iowa men
- Company D: Michigan "Michigan Boys”, recruited around the state but the majority came from Battle Creek, Michigan and the greater Calhoun County, Michigan area.
- Company E: Illinois (Edgar County)
- Company F: Missouri and outstate members
- Company G: 1st Independent Company of Ohio Volunteer Sharpshooters (Reed's Sharpshooters)
- Company H: 2nd Independent Company of Ohio Volunteer Sharpshooters (Dougherty's Sharpshooters)
- Company I: Illinois (Lawrence County)
- Company K: 3rd Independent Company of Ohio Volunteer Sharpshooters (Taylor's Sharpshooters)

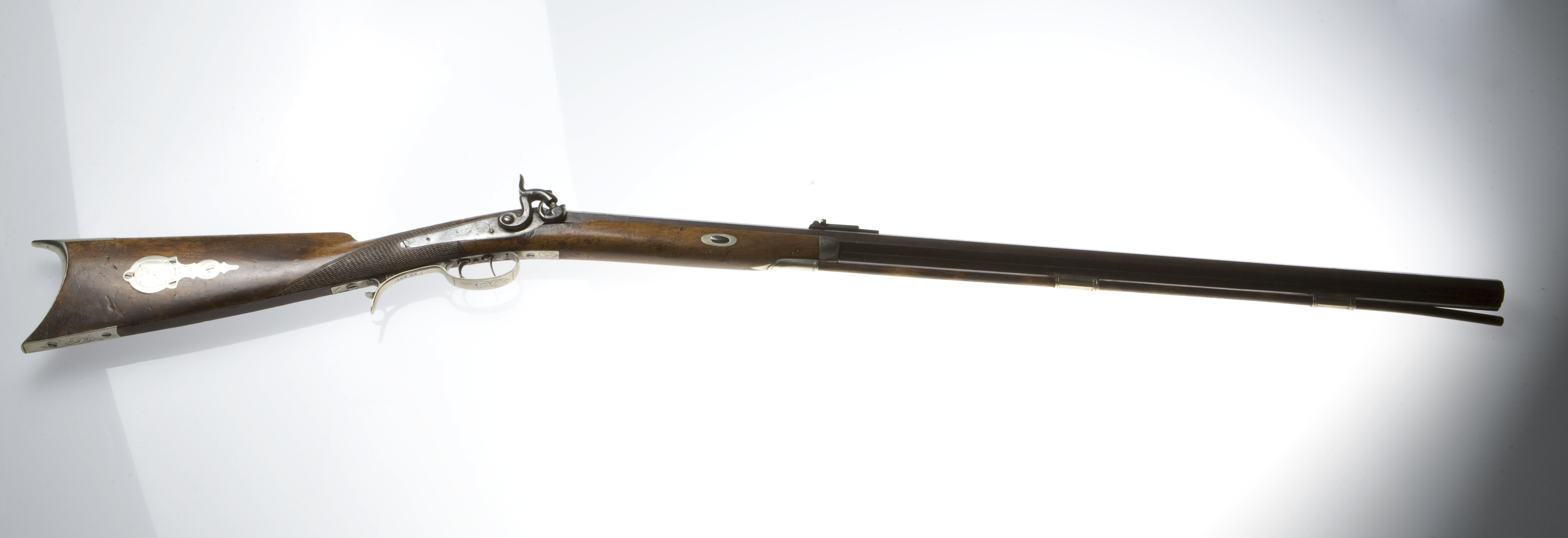
Dimick contract rifle of Corp. Francis M. Jones

The regiment was envisioned as a specialized unit of marksmen and skirmishers, a Western Theater counterpart to Colonel Hiram Berdan's 1st and 2nd U.S. Sharpshooters (raised from multiple states under President Lincoln's patronage for service in the Eastern Theater). On August 28, 1861, Fremont authorized a St. Louis physician, John Ward Birge, to raise the regiment and muster recruits at Benton Barracks, St. Louis.

"To Col J. W. Birge, St. Louis: Sir, you are hereby authorized to raise a regiment of Riflemen to be under your command and to serve for three years or during the war, unless sooner discharged in accordance with the late act of Congress. The men of your Regiment must have produced satisfactory evidence of their ability to hit a target at two hundred yards no three shots to measure more than ten inches. Your Regiment will rendezvous in this city to which place transportation will be furnished to all recruits and subsistence on their arrival. Recruiting officers will be provided with transportation when traveling in connection with their duties. You will report the progress of your organization to the Head Quarters[,] which will be complete in six weeks"

— J.C. Fremont, Maj Gen Commanding

As marksmen, Fremont intended that they should have a special uniform (Note: A veteran of the unit described the WSS' original uniform in the Feb 23, 1893 edition of the NATIONAL TRIBUNE newspaper. In addition to the "squirrel-tail" hat, the Western Sharpshooters were initially issued grey trousers with a green stripe down the seam, and the standard Federal frock coat, with rifleman's green piping in place of the standard sky blue of the infantry. Numerous other sources report that the Western Sharpshooters were issued non-standard equipage provided (per Birge's instruction) by gunmaker Horace Dimick. This included a shoulder bag, covered with bear fur, for rifle tools and sundries in place of a cartridge box, and a powder horn in place of a powder flask.) based on "hunter's dress" and be armed with highly accurate Plains Rifles (handmade half-stock long rifles), provided by the famed St. Louis firearms firm of Horace (H.E.) Dimick of St. Louis (a competitor of the Hawken Brothers, also of St. Louis). While the majority of the special uniform envisioned by Fremont did not survive long beyond his removal (except for an extraordinary sugar loaf hat decorated with three squirrel tails), Dimick fulfilled his contract, providing over 1,000 long rifles, although he had to scour regional (and even east coast) gunmakers to fulfill the enormous order for handmade weapons in the time allotted. The Western Sharpshooters found the "Dimick Rifle" (as the unit called them, although Dimick's gunsmiths built only about 150) to be lethally accurate and declared themselves "well pleased" with the Plains Rifles.

Fremont's scheme was partially squelched by Major General Halleck when he relieved Fremont in November 1862, ending additional recruitment. General Halleck returned a tenth company of Missouri sharpshooters under Captain John Welker (which had initially been recruited by Birge, but detached on MG Fremont's orders for his southwestern expedition, and subsequently operated as an independent company), (Note: This story of this episode is complex. While Welker's company was on campaign it was "discovered" that they had not been properly sworn, and so (possibly at the suggestion of Captain John Holman, commander of an independent company of sharpshooters accompanying Fremont), Birge's men were sworn in as "Company B" of "Holman's Battalion of Sharpshooters" with Holman as the "battalion's" Major. This gave Holman command authority over Welker who had previously been his co-equal. It also gave Holman a free company of picked men, and their Dimick rifles. This arrangement fell apart shortly afterward when Fremont was relieved and Brigadier General Samuel Curtis, noting that-in the words of historian Victor Paul-"two companies do not make a battalion" disapproved Holman's promotion to Major, and Welker was "ordered to consider himself the Captain of an independent company" of sharpshooters. The inclusion of Welker's company was thus the return, of men-and arms-to Birge's regiment where they had originated. Paul, Victor, (1997) Roster Study of the Sharpshooters of the Army of the Tennessee, Washington, MO, Obscure Place Publishing, p 95) bringing Birge's Western Sharpshooters up to full strength of ten companies. Immediately afterward, Halleck ordered the partially equipped and trained sharpshooters into the field in guerrilla racked central and northern Missouri. On December 12, 1861, Colonel John W. Birge, of St. Louis, marched them from Benton Barracks to Centralia, in Northern Missouri. The regiment was then deployed in small detachments to fight bands of the secessionist Missouri State Guard and guerrillas attacking the strategically vital North Missouri Rail Road and other targets of interest to the Federal government. On December 28, 1861, five companies of Birge's Sharpshooters and five companies of cavalry fought a mixed force of Missouri State Guard and secessionist volunteers at the small, but strategically important Battle of Mount Zion Church.

On February 4, 1862, the sharpshooters were first shipped by railroad to St. Louis and then by steamboat to Fort Henry, where they eventually arrived on the 9th, just too late to take part in its capture. (Note: As they passed through St. Louis, Maj. Gen. Halleck ordered Company A (Welker's Company) stripped out of the regiment and reassigned to the newly forming 26th Missouri Volunteer Infantry Regiment, temporarily reducing the regiment to nine companies). At Fort Henry, the Sharpshooters joined Colonel Lauman's brigade of General C.F. Smith's division and marched with them to Fort Donelson. In Grant's army they served at the Battle of Fort Donelson and the Battle of Shiloh.

== Missouri service ==
On April 14, 1862, acting commander Lt Col B.S. Compton received a letter informing him that on the order of Major General Henry Halleck, Commander of the Department of Missouri, the regiment had been redesignated the "Western Sharpshooters-14th Missouri Volunteers". (Note: the WSS-14th Missouri Volunteers (3 Years Service) does not share lineage with the short lived 14th Missouri Volunteers (3 Months Service) which was the Lafayette Country Home Guard unit and fought at the Battle of Lexington, Missouri. Some post war Missouri state records have confused these distinct and unrelated organizations.)

The redesignated WSS-14th MO Vols, participated in General Halleck's long advance on the Confederate rail center at Corinth, Mississippi, skirmishing ahead of the main force almost every day. On May 30, 1862 Confederate General P.G.T. Beauregard evacuated the city without a fight. The Sharpshooters were then stationed in the Corinth area.

On July 8, 1862, the regiment's new commander Colonel Patrick E. Burke arrived. A veteran militia officer, he had been awarded a Regular Army Captain's commission following service in the old 1st Missouri Volunteers in General Lyon's Missouri campaigns (including participation in the stand at Bloody Hill at Wilson's Creek) . Colonel Burke used the period at Corinth to integrate new recruits from Camp Butler and unify the regiment as a military organization.

In mid-September 1862, in response to the offensive by Confederate Generals Earl Van Dorn and Sterling Price, a three company battalion of the Sharpshooters marched south with Major General Rosecrans' army towards Iuka, Mississippi. This detachment participated in the September 19th battle. They then returned to Corinth, where the entire regiment fought on both days of the October 3rd-4th (2nd) Battle of Corinth. On Oct 4th, as per General Rosecrans' orders, the regiment fought as skirmishers in the timber in front of the Federal fortifications (to the right of a 3 company battalion of the 64th Illinois ["Yates' Sharpshooters"]). They skirmished under the direct command of Colonel Burke from 4 a.m. to around 10 a.m., when they began to fall back on the main Federal line. When the Federal center collapsed, the regiment fell back again towards the town and Battery Robinette, where they continued to fight until the Confederate breach was contained.

== Illinois service ==
After the Second Battle of Corinth, the regiment helped establish Camp Davies, a stockaded outpost six miles south of Corinth. In December, 1862 (after the strong intervention of Governor Yates of Illinois) the Sharpshooters were transferred to Illinois service as the 66th Illinois Volunteer Infantry (Western Sharpshooters) on November 20, 1862. (The regiment was allowed to maintain the Western Sharpshooters as part of its official designation following a request by letter to Governor Yates from Colonel Burke.) Beginning in the autumn of 1863 the men of the regiment began equipping themselves with the new 16 shot Henry Repeating Rifle, giving them a major advantage in firepower over their Confederate opponents. Over 250 of the sharpshooters spent an average of 40 dollars out of pocket (over three months pay for a Private) to arm themselves with this highly effective new weapon. The government, while it did not purchase the weapons, did provide Henry rifle cartridges for companies whose soldiers had done so. (Note: The Federal government began supplying the proprietary Henry rimfire metallic cartridges in April, 1864. Billby, Joseph G., A Revolution in Arms: A History of the First Repeating Rifles, Westholm Publishing, Yardley, Pennsylvania, 2006, p133)

The regiment remained at Camp Davies until November 12, 1863, when 2nd Division, XVI Corps moved to Pulaski, Tennessee, where they established "Camp P.E. Burke". During December 1863, 470 men of the regiment re-enlisted and in January, 1864, were sent to Chicago to be given veteran furlough. After being re-organized as a veteran regiment of 600 men, they returned to Pulaski, until April 29, when they left for Chattanooga to join in the Atlanta campaign.

The regiment left Chattanooga on May 6, and three days later opened the fighting against the Army of Tennessee, at Snake Creek Gap and the Battle of Resaca. There, on May 9, the Sharpshooters singlehandedly captured the Heights at Resaca, Georgia. Throughout the Atlanta campaign, the regiment was used as the scouting and skirmishing spearhead of XVI Army Corps and participated in ten major battles. (Note: A full discussion of the Sharpshooters combat record during this period is not feasible due to the sheer number of actions involved with their exceptional service during the July 22, 1864 "Battle of Atlanta". On that day, they fought in three different actions, separated by over three miles of battlefield. Standing in open ground they helped break-up an attack on the XVII Corps front, and then maneuvered to turn back a breakthrough in the XV Corps area...over two miles away. During the second action, the Sharpshooters, under the acting command of Capt William S. Boyd, participated in the recapture of DeGress Battery of the 1st IL Lt Arty.)

After the Atlanta Campaign, the regiment was attached to the XV Corps where they remained until they mustered out. They participated in Sherman's March to the Sea and the Carolinas campaign and their last combat action of the war was at the Battle of Bentonville. The regiment accompanied Sherman to Washington, D.C., where they marched in the Grand Review of the Armies on May 24, 1865, and were subsequently discharged from service on July 7, 1865.

== Total strength and casualties ==
The regiment lost six officers and 73 enlisted men who were killed in action or mortally wounded and two officers and 146 enlisted men who died of disease, for a total of 227 fatalities.

== Commanders ==
- Colonel John W. Birge - commissioned a colonel, Birge was replaced by;
- Lieutenant Colonel Benjamin S. Compton
- Colonel Patrick E. Burke - mortally wounded at the Battle of Rome Cross Roads on May 16, 1864, while commanding 2nd Brigade, 2nd Division, Left Wing, XVI Corps, Army of the Tennessee. Died at Resaca, Georgia, on the morning of May 20, 1864;
- Captain William S. Boyd - Captain of Co A, and in tactical command of the regiment when Burke was wounded, continued in de facto field command of the Regiment through the March to the Sea;
- Lieutenant Colonel Andrew K. Campbell - Mustered out with the regiment.

Corporal Lemuel Trowbridge (Calvin) Trowbridge

== See also ==
- List of Illinois Civil War Units
- Illinois in the American Civil War
- List of United States Volunteer Civil War units
- 64th Illinois Volunteer Infantry-"Yates Sharpshooters"
