= 26th Missouri Infantry Regiment =

- Active: September 1861 to August 13, 1865
- Country: United States
- Allegiance: Union
- Branch: Infantry
- Engagements: Siege of Corinth; Battle of Iuka; Second Battle of Corinth; Yazoo Pass Expedition; Battle of Port Gibson (reserves); Battle of Raymond; Battle of Champion Hill; Siege of Vicksburg, May 19 & May 22 assaults Chattanooga campaign Battle of Missionary Ridge; Sherman's March to the Sea; Carolinas campaign (two companies); Battle of Bentonville (two companies)

The 26th Missouri Infantry Regiment was an infantry regiment that served in the Union Army during the American Civil War.

== Service ==
The 26th Missouri Infantry Regiment was organized from recruits across the state of Missouri, September through December 1861 and mustered in for three years service under the command of Colonel George Boardman Boomer.

The regiment was attached to the Department of the Missouri to February 1862. 2nd Brigade, 2nd Division, Army of the Mississippi, to April 1862. 1st Brigade, 3rd Division, Army of the Mississippi, to November 1862. 3rd Brigade, 7th Division, Left Wing, XIII Corps, Department of the Tennessee, to December 1862. 3rd Brigade, 7th Division, XVI Corps, to January 1863. 3rd Brigade, 7th Division, XVII Corps, to September 1863. 3rd Brigade, 2nd Division, XVII Corps, to December 1863. 3rd Brigade, 3rd Division, XV Corps, to August 1864. 2nd Brigade, 3rd Division, XV Corps, to April 1865. 3rd Brigade, 2nd Division, XV Corps, to August 1865.

The regiment included two Independent Sharpshooters (ISS) companies: Company A formerly "Company A, Holman's Independent Battalion of Sharpshooters" and Company B (Captain John Welker) formerly "Company A, Birge's Western Sharpshooters". Company A was armed with Sharps carbines and Company B was armed (at least initially) with Dimick long rifles. These independent sharpshooters companies were used as dedicated skirmishing units and as snipers in static combat situations.

Companies A, B, C, D, E, F, and G mustered out of service November 4, 1864, to January 9, 1865. The remainder of the regiment mustered out August 13, 1865.

== Detailed service ==
Duty in Missouri until February 1862. Operations against New Madrid, Mo., February 28-March 15, and against Island No. 10, Mississippi River, March 15-April 8. Pursuit and capture at Tiptonville April 8. Expedition to Fort Pillow, Tenn., April 13–17. Moved to Hamburg Landing, Tenn., April 18–22. Advance on and siege of Corinth, Miss., April 29-May 30. Pursuit to Booneville May 31-June 12. At Clear Creek until August. Moved to Jacinto August 5. March to Iuka, Miss., September 18–19. Battle of Iuka September 19. Battle of Corinth October 3–4. Pursuit to Ripley October 5–12. Grant's Central Mississippi Campaign November 1862 to January 1863. At Memphis, Tenn., until March 1863. Expedition to Yazoo Pass and operations against Fort Pemberton and Greenwood March 13-April 5. Moved to Milliken's Bend, La., April 13. Movement on Bruinsburg and turning Grand Gulf April 25–30. Battle of Port Gibson, Miss., May 1 (reserve). Raymond May 12. Near Raymond May 13. Jackson May 14. Champion Hill May 16. Big Black Crossing May 17. Siege of Vicksburg, Miss., May 18-July 4. Assaults on Vicksburg May 19 and 22. Surrender of Vicksburg July 4. Moved to Jackson July 13–15. Siege of Jackson July 15–17. At Vicksburg until September 12. Moved to Helena, Ark., September 12; to Memphis, Tenn., September 30, and marched to Chattanooga, Tenn., October 3-November 19. Operations on Memphis & Charleston Railroad in Alabama October 20–29. Chattanooga-Ringgold Campaign November 23–27. Tunnel Hill November 23–24. Missionary Ridge November 25. Pursuit to Graysville November 26–27. Moved to Bridgeport, Ala., December 3; to Larkinsville, Ala., December 22, and to Huntsville, Ala., January 17, 1864. Duty there until June 1864. Demonstration on Dalton February 22–27. Tunnel Hill, Buzzard's Roost Gap and Rocky Faced Ridge February 23–25. Railroad guard duty between Chattanooga and Allatoona, Ga., until November. March to the sea November 15-December 10. Ogeechee River December 7–9. Siege of Savannah December 10–21. Campaign of the Carolinas January to April 1865. Salkehatchie Swamps, S.C., February 2–5. South Edisto River February 9. North Edisto River February 11–12. Columbia February 15–17. Cox's Bridge, Neuse River, N.C., March 19–20. Battle of Bentonville March 20–21. Occupation of Goldsboro March 24. Advance on Raleigh April 10–14. Occupation of Raleigh April 14. Bennett's House April 26. Surrender of Johnston and his army. March to Washington, D.C., via Richmond, Va., April 29-May 20. Grand Review of the Armies May 24. Moved to Louisville, Ky., June. Duty there and at Little Rock, Ark., until August.

== Casualties ==
The regiment lost a total of 303 men during service; 6 officers and 112 enlisted men killed or mortally wounded, 2 officers and 183 enlisted men died of disease.

== Commanders ==
- Colonel George Boardman Boomer - promoted to brigadier general; killed in action at Vicksburg, May 22, 1863
- Colonel Benjamin D. Dean - commanded at Vicksburg as captain following the death of Major Brown
- Major Charles F. Brown - commanded at the battles of Raymond, Champion Hill, and Vicksburg; killed in action at Vicksburg, May 16, 1863
- Lieutenant Colonel Theron M. Rice, in command at the regiment's mustering out in St. Louis in the summer of 1865.
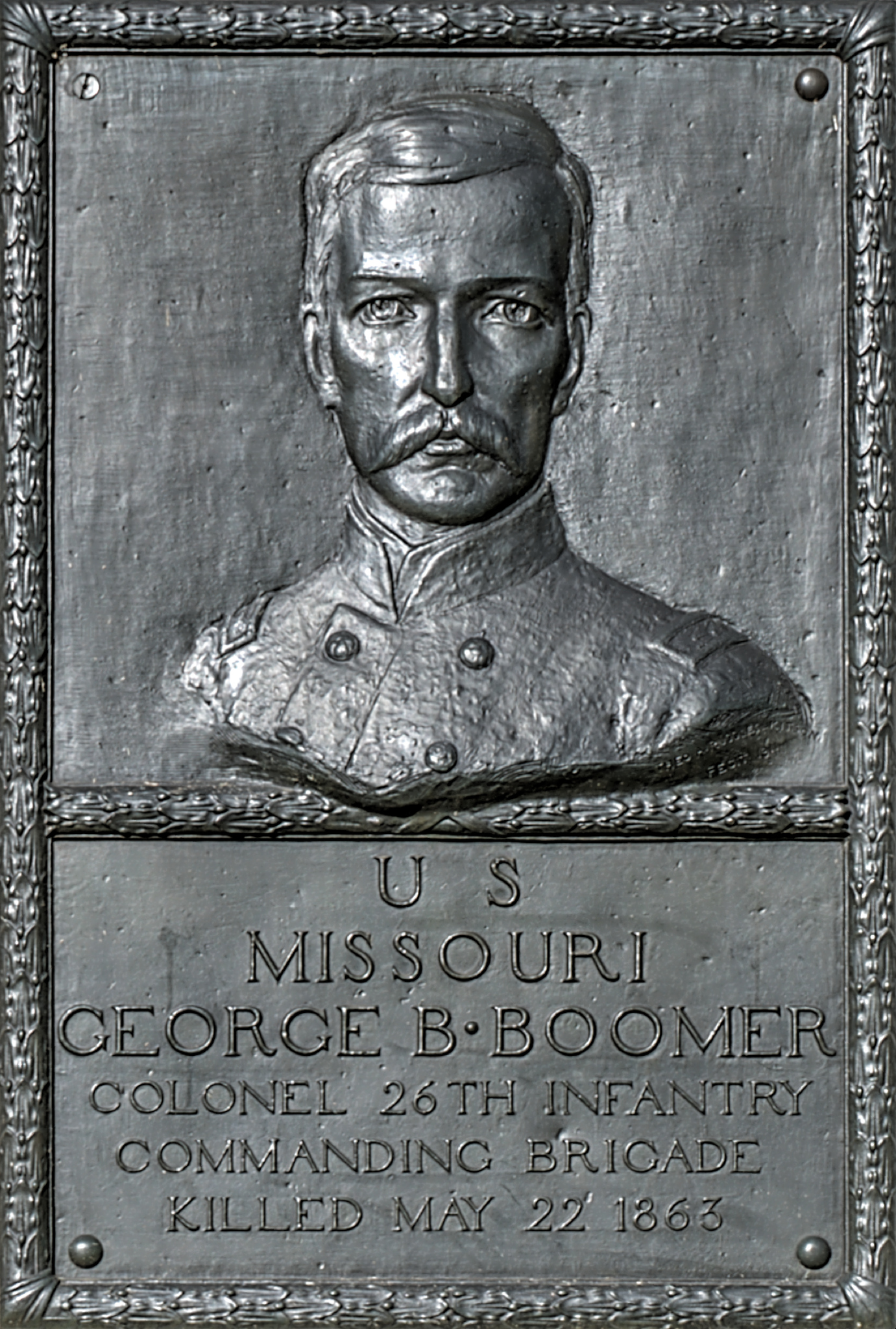
Bronze relief portrait of Col. Boomer at Vicksburg National Military Park

== See also ==
- Missouri Civil War Union units
- Missouri in the Civil War
