= George B. Boomer =

Union Army general (1832–1863)

George Boardman Boomer
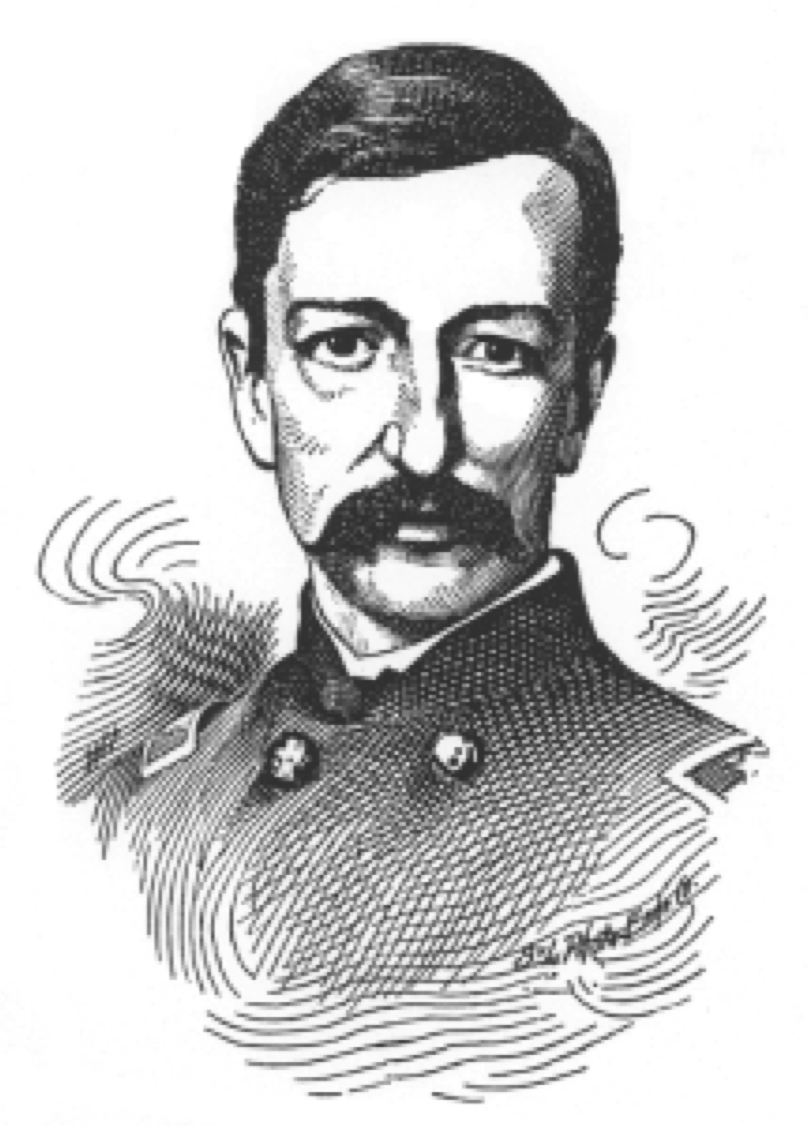
- Born: July 26, 1832; Sutton, Massachusetts, US
- Died: May 22, 1863 (aged 30); Warren County, Mississippi, US
- Burial place: Worcester, Massachusetts, US
- Military career
- Allegiance: United States; Union
- Branch: United States Army; Union Army
- Service years: 1861 - 1863
- Rank: Colonel
- Commands: 26th Missouri Volunteer Infantry
- Conflicts: American Civil War

George Boardman Boomer (July 26, 1832 – May 22, 1863) was a Union Army colonel who served as a brigade commander between February 12, 1863, and May 22, 1863, during the American Civil War. His principal service was during the heavy engagement of his brigade on May 16, 1863, at the Battle of Champion Hill during the Vicksburg campaign and in the second assault on Vicksburg on May 22, 1863. Colonel Boomer was killed near the Railroad Redoubt on the second day of major assaults on the City of Vicksburg on May 22, 1863.

== Biography ==
Boomer was born in Sutton, Massachusetts, on July 26, 1832. He was the son of a Baptist minister. He attended Uxbridge Academy and Worcester Academy and graduated in 1847. He spoke fluent French and played Bach on the piano. Because of poor eyesight, Boomer did not go on to college. Instead, he joined his brother-in-law in building bridges across the Mississippi River.

At the outbreak of the Civil War, he raised a company for the Union Army which became part of the 26th Missouri Volunteer Infantry Regiment and by 1863 was promoted to colonel. He was wounded at the Battle of Iuka. He distinguished himself at Vicksburg as brigade commander under Major General James B. McPherson.

== Battle of Champion Hill ==
Boomer and his men distinguished themselves in the Battle of Champion Hill on May 16, 1863. Below is the description of the battle by Benjamin Devor Dean, Captain, at the time, of the 26th Missouri:

The 26th went into this engagement under very trying circumstances. General Hovey’s Division was being hard pressed, and falling back, the Third Brigade, Col. Boomer, commanding, was ordered up on the double-quick. The ground over which the 26th Missouri passed, was very much obstructed, and in consequence some of the companies had to break the line of battle and move by the flank under the shells of the enemy. On reaching the line of battle, notwithstanding our fatigue, the 10th Iowa and 93rd Illinois immediately engaged the enemy; the 5th Iowa and 26th Missouri lying down behind them waiting their turn which soon came. Colonel Boomer, our gallant brigade commander, seeing the enemy approaching on our right flank, ordered the 26th Missouri to meet them, which it did on the double quick by "about face," "half wheel" and forward movement, getting possession of a deep ravine which the enemy was trying to secure. The position gained by the above movement was a strong one, and enabled us to stop the enemy who outnumbered the 26th Missouri, which finally drove the Confederates from before it, after firing forty rounds of ammunition. Being nearly surrounded by the enemy, we changed our position under heavy fire, but the position was so strong that the loss was slight considering the hot engagement. We charged the rebels, drove them back and captured a number of prisoners. On falling back to Acting General Boomer's position, he earnestly complimented the 26th Missouri for their gallant conduct on the field.

== Death ==
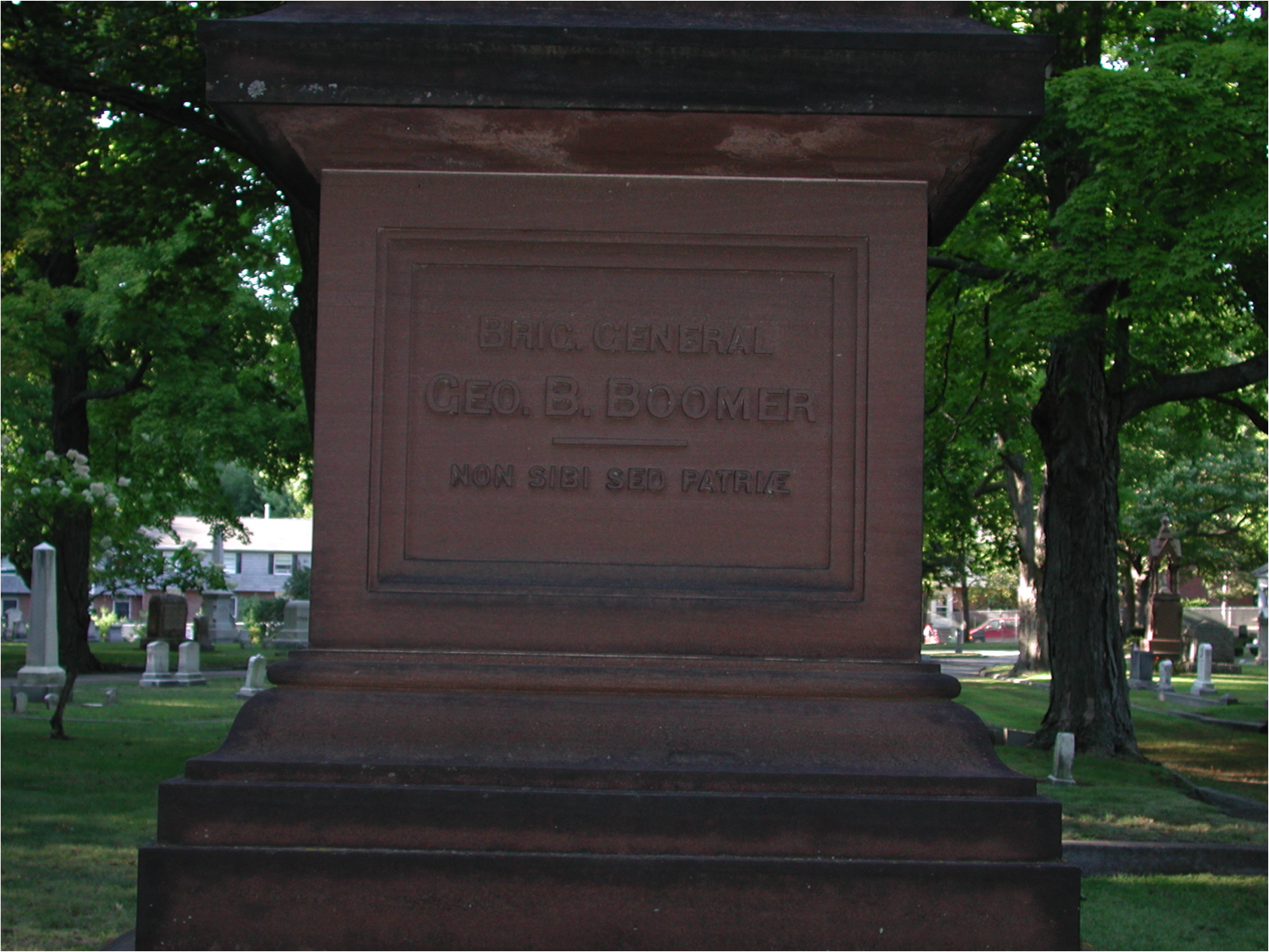
The base of the Boomer Column, Rural Cemetery, Worcester, MA

Six days after the heroic actions at Champion Hill, Colonel Boomer was killed in the second assault on Vicksburg on May 22, 1863.

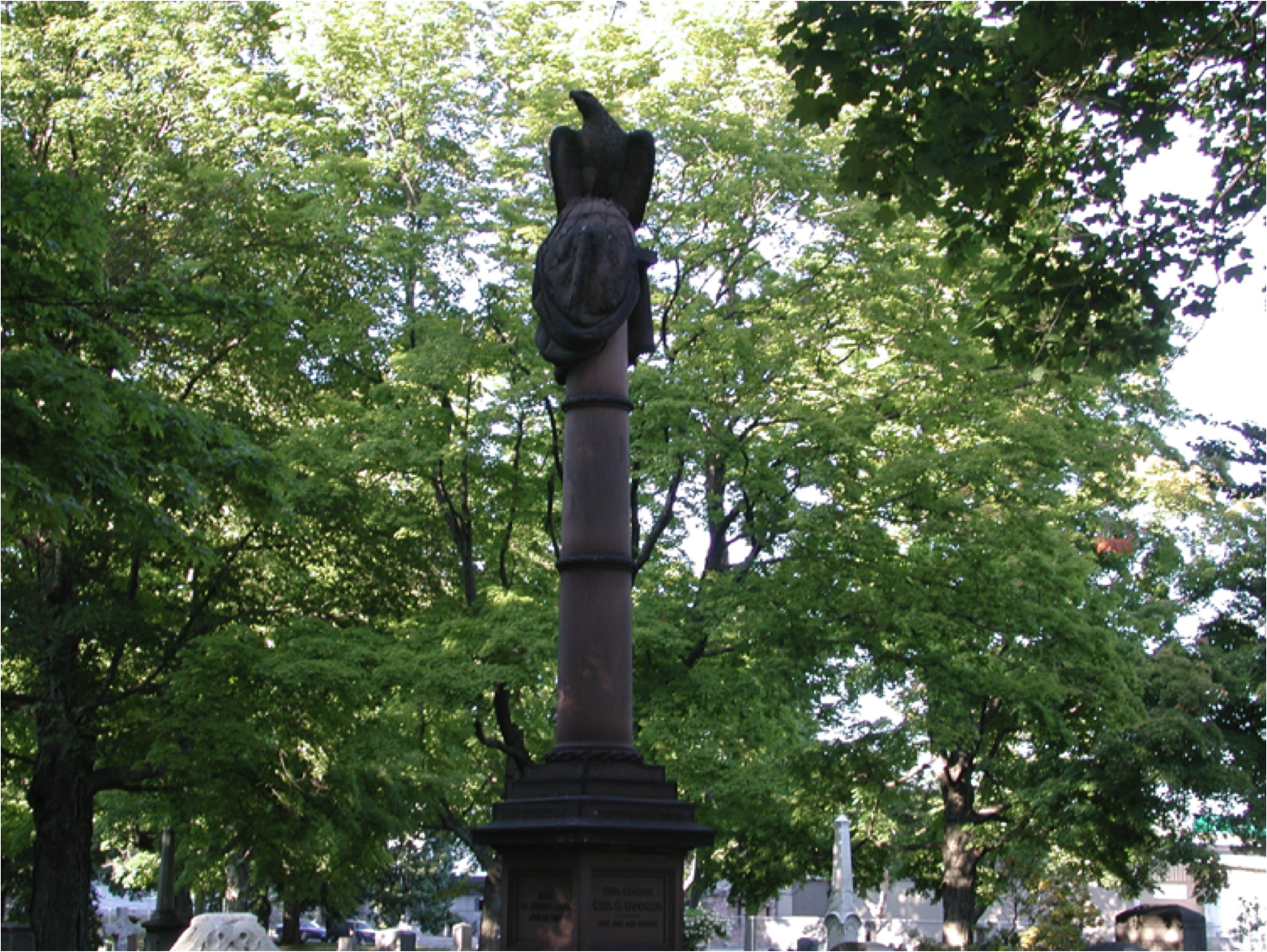
Boomer Column Rural Cemetery Worcester, MA

According to Benjamin Devor Dean, on May 22 Colonel Boomer led his men on a brave charge upon one of the forts that made up Vicksburg's defenses. Colonel Boomer had advised against storming the fort, warning his superiors that it had not yet been "silenced" of its arms. But his superiors did not listen to his advice, so Colonel Boomer and his men charged the fort gallantly. As Boomer predicted, the fort had not been silenced and immediately he and his men came under heavy fire - "an incessant shower of shot, shell and rifle balls." Colonel Boomer and his men were momentarily forced to take cover. Soon afterwards, Colonel Boomer courageously decided to push on - he personally "rose up, and had shouted "Attention!" as if to resume the charge, when a rifle ball struck him in the head, killing him instantly."

His body was returned to Worcester, Massachusetts, and thousands attended his funeral. He was buried in Rural Cemetery in Worcester and the monument honoring him is a thirty-foot column with a large eagle at the top. His bravery was written about at the time.

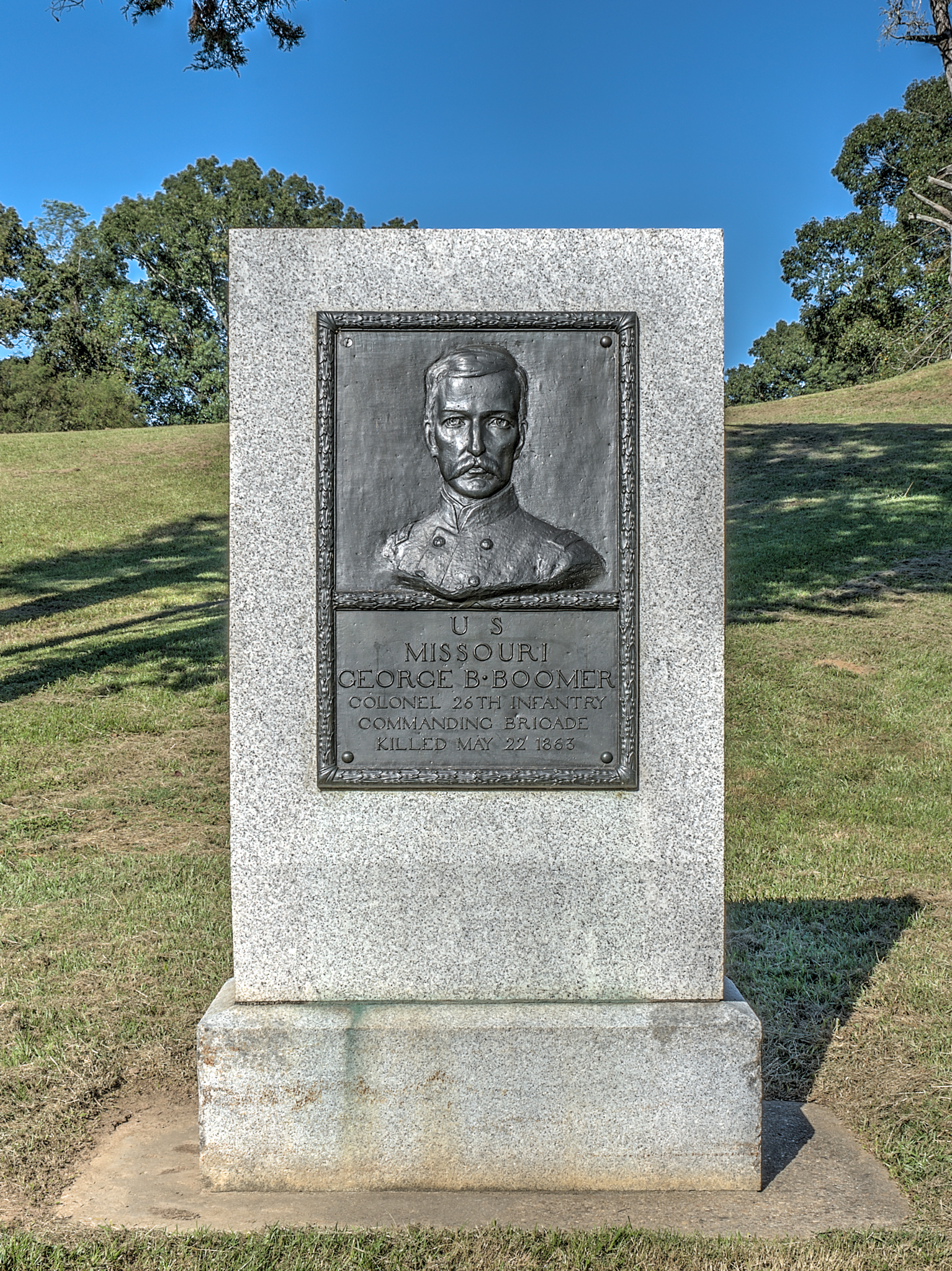
Bronze relief portrait at Vicksburg National Military Park

A memoir of Colonel Boomer's life was published by his sister, Mary Amelia Boomer Stone, in 1864.
