= Horace Dimick =

Horace E. Dimick was a gunsmith and firearms dealer active in St. Louis, Missouri from 1849 through the early 1870s. Dimick expanded from a small custom gun store, to a larger emporium selling a variety of firearms and even manufacturing cannons. Dimick was respected for the quality of his firearms, but especially well known for his percussion rifles, especially his highly accurate plains rifles. During the Civil War, Dimick became nationally famous for providing the rifles for the elite sharpshooters of the 66th Illinois Volunteer Infantry Regiment.

== Early years ==
Horace E. Dimick was born in Vermont around 1809. By 1839 he had moved to Lexington, Kentucky where he initially owned an upholstering company. Sometime afterwards he entered the gunsmithing trade, becoming well known locally and even nationally. In a December 15, 1846 letter from the Army Ordnance Officer in Washington, Dimick is praised for his "...great skill...and his success in the applying of new principles to firearms...his plan for rifles is now acknowledged to be the best extant."

Around 1849, Dimick moved to St. Louis, which was then the center of frontier firearms manufacturing. Dimick opened his first establishment at 39 North Main St. and found himself in competition with some of the world's finest gunsmiths, including the famed Hawken Brothers. Dimick expanded beyond gunsmithing, providing a variety of frontier goods at his "Western Emporium". Civil booster J. N. Taylor describes H. E. Dimick and Company's wide selection in his 1858 Sketch book of St. Louis:

"The position held by this house is second to none in the world, and has been achieved by the exertions of Mr. Horace E. Dimick, whose name is familiar wherever the rifles is used. This firm established themselves in St. Louis in 1849, and at once attracted a large share of public attention on account of the splendid assortment of fire-arms that compose their stock.

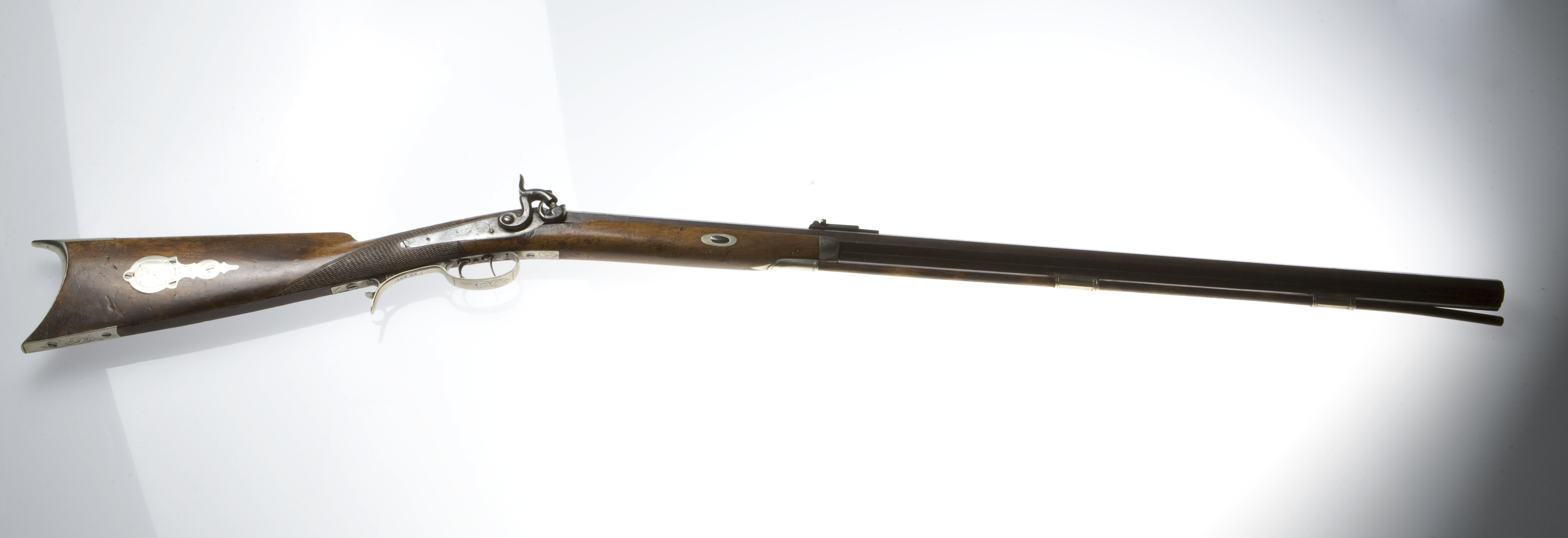
Dimick contract rifle of Corp. Francis M. Jones, Birge's Western Sharpshooters

Mr. Dimick has passed twenty years in handling and manufacturing arms, and we only state a well known fact that he has not his superior in the world....The stock on hand of these gentlemen consists of every thing embraced in the paraphernalia of the sportsman- Guns, Pistols, Colt's Revolvers, Rifles, Bowie Knives, Dirks, Revolvers of different patterns, Fishing Tackle in the greatest abundance, Game Bags, etc

H.E. Dimick & Co., besides engaging extensively in the manufacture of weapons, import largely from the manufacturies in Europe. In selecting their stock, the practical knowledge of the members of the firm renders them valuable assistance, as they are thereby enabled to obtain the very best, and refuse all that does not fully answer their requirements....

We would urge upon those who intend to purchase anything in their line to give Messrs. Dimick & Co. a call as we are certain they will fill all orders as favorable terms as any other in the world."

By 1860, Dimick had 27 gunsmiths working for him, building a variety of firearms, including derringer pistols, shotguns and hunting rifles. Dimick personally competed in sharpshooting contests to publicize his shops products, and entered the shop's weapons in regional competitions and fairs with great success. At the 1858 Third Annual Fair of the St. Louis Agricultural and Mechanical Association, H.E. Dimick and Company won the Grand Silver Medal in all categories the company competed in: Target Pistols; Shotguns; and Rifles.

Dimick's rifles, cost $5 more than standard-issued Springfields ($25 to 20), were used as a sharpshooter weapon with the Col. Bérge's regiment during the Civil War.

Dimick died in St. Louis in August, 1874.
