= Hawken rifle =

Muzzle-loading rifle

Hawken Type Plains Rifle
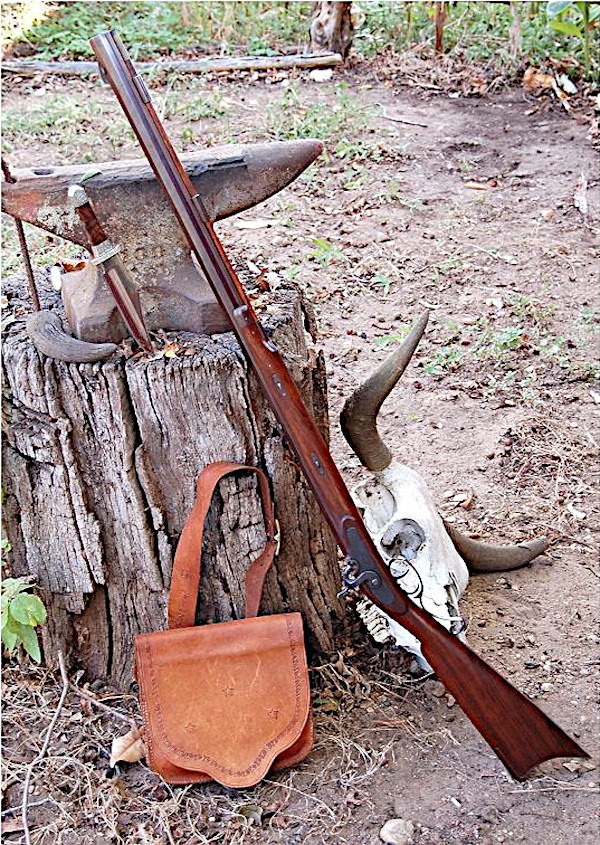
- Lyman Replica of Plains Rifle
- Type: Long rifle
- Place of origin: United States

Service history
- In service: 1823–1870

Production history
- Designer: Samuel Hawken
- Designed: 1823
- Variants: Single trigger or double set trigger

Specifications
- Mass: About 10–15 pounds (4.5–6.8 kg)
- Caliber: Round shot, averaged .54 in (14 mm) caliber
- Action: Flintlock/percussion lock (after about 1835)
- Rate of fire: User-dependent
- Muzzle velocity: Variable
- Effective firing range: 400 yards (370 m)
- Feed system: Muzzle-loaded
- Sights: Open blade sight

The Hawken rifle is a muzzle-loading rifle that was widely used on the prairies and in the Rocky Mountains of the United States during the early frontier days. Developed in the 1820s, it became synonymous with the "plains rifle", the buffalo gun, and a trade rifle for fur trappers, traders, clerks, and hunters. It was displaced after the American Civil War by breechloaders (such as the Sharps rifle) and lever action rifles.

The Hawken rifle was made and sold by Jacob and Samuel Hawken. Trained by their father as rifle smiths on the East Coast, the brothers moved to St. Louis, Missouri, at the beginning of the Rocky Mountain fur trade. Opening a gun shop in St. Louis in 1815, they developed their Hawken Rifle, dubbed "Rocky Mountain Rifle", to serve the needs of fur trappers, traders, and explorers, a quality gunː light enough to carry all the time and that could knock down big animals at long range.

In 1858, the shop passed to other owners who continued to operate and sell rifles bearing the Hawken name: William S. Hawken, William L. Watt, and J. P. Gemmer. Gemmer closed the business and retired in 1915.

== History ==
The earliest known record of a Hawken rifle dates to 1823 when one was made for William Henry Ashley. The rifle was dubbed "Old Bill" and had a 42-inch barrel carrying an ounce ball (about .68 caliber). While the Hawken brothers made several guns, including flintlock rifles and some of the earlier percussion caps, no additional Hawken rifles were produced before 1831. In 1831 fur traders Peter A. Sarpy and Etienne Papin are recorded as using the rifle. In 1832 several mountain men are listed as purchasing Hawken rifles, including brigade leaders Andrew Drips and Lucien Fontenelle. Members of later Ashley Rendezvous also owned Hawken rifles, including Auguste Arhcambeau and Ft. Union hunter Joseph Ramsey.

The Hawkens did not mass-produce their rifles but rather made each one by hand, one at a time. They employed a small crew working in a frame building producing approximately 100 rifles a year. A number of famous men were said to have owned Hawken rifles, including Auguste Lacome, Hugh Glass, Jim Bridger, Kit Carson, Orrin Porter Rockwell, Joseph Meek, Jedediah Strong Smith, and Theodore Roosevelt.

Hawken rifles had a reputation for both accuracy and long range.

Samuel Hawken outlived his brother and remained in business until 1855 when his son William continued with the business moving to a new shop that year. In 1856 partner Tristan Campbell dropped out of the business which closed the sporting-goods section of the shop. William continued with the gunsmith operation until he was forced to close the shop at the heart of the Panic of 1857. The Hawken rifle company was sold in 1862 to William Watt, and the last rifle actually made by a Hawken was built in 1884.

Although popular with mountain men and hunters of the fur trade era, up through the mid part of the 19th century, muzzleloaders were generally replaced by mass-produced, breech-loading weapons such as the Sharps rifle and the Winchester rifle.

== Design ==
Jacob Hawken had an early influence from a gunsmith in Virginia and may have also used the iron-mounted Southern bear-rifles of the early 1800s for inspiration for the Hawken rifle. The plain iron-mounted Hawken rifle may also been partly designed by James Lakenan, Hawken's associate that had a military influence in making iron-mounted militia rifle with a stout scroll guard and long iron patch box that resembled civilian hunting rifles, including the Hawken rifle. Jacob Hawken also had military rifle experience that may have inspired the oval, bottom-hinged patch box used in the Hawken rifle.

The rifles are generally shorter and of a larger caliber than earlier "Kentucky rifles" from which they descend. The style of the rifles is the same as the Harpers Ferry Model 1803, a half stock rifle (although they also made some with full stock), with the same lines as the Kentucky rifle. The "plains rifle" style would become the "sporter" for much of the United States during the 1840s.

Their "Rocky Mountain" guns were typically .50 caliber or .53 caliber, but ranged as high as .68 caliber. They averaged 10 1/2 pounds (4.8 kg), although there are examples of 15 pounds (6.8 kg) guns. Barrels were of varying lengths (33 and 36 inch examples are described), and are octagonal on the outside and made of wrought iron. The walnut or maple stocks have a curved cheek piece, often looking like a beaver's tail and called that. They tended to have double triggers; the rear trigger is a "set" trigger. When the rear trigger is pulled, the hammer does not fall but rather the action "sets" the front trigger, the front trigger becoming a "hair trigger," tripped with a light touch. In many examples, when the front trigger is used without using the rear "set" trigger, it requires a firm pull, and others require the trigger to be set before the front trigger will drop the hammer at all. Although, the 25th anniversary model manufactured by Thompson/Center was an exception to this. Rather, it had a single trigger with a tension screw that allowed for adjustment of take-up and length of pull. The front sight was a blade sight. Unlike many modern reproductions, the butt plate and other trim were not made of brass, but of iron.

== Cost ==
The first recorded sale of a Hawken rifle was in 1831. The fixed price for a traditional Hawken rifle was $22.50–$25.00. Several of the fine engraved Hawken rifles sold for $38 between 1837–1842. A .70 caliber Hawken rifle, the largest caliber example known, that was once owned by Theodore Roosevelt was set for auction in May 2024 with an estimated auction value of US$55,000 to US$85,000.

== In popular culture ==
In Karl May's Winnetou books, the eponymous Indian brave and his blood brother Old Shatterhand both owned Hawken rifles. Winnetou decorated his rifle with silver thumb tacks, and Old Shatterhand named his own gun Bear Slayer.

The 1972 film Jeremiah Johnson, starring Robert Redford as a mountain man who used such a rifle, contributed to general interest in replicas and a resurgence in the popularity of muzzleloaders among modern hunters.

In How the West Was Won which is an American Western television series that starred James Arness, Eva Marie Saint, Fionnula Flanagan, Bruce Boxleitner, and Richard Kiley. Loosely based on the 1962 Cinerama film of the same name, it began with a two-hour television film, The Macahans, in 1976, followed by a mini-series in 1977, and a regular series in 1978 and 1979. One of the show’s main characters, Zebulon Macahan, portrayed by James Arness, is a famous mountain man who uses such a rifle. Zebulon is seen using his Hawken Rifle in The Macahans, set in 1861, and the mini-series.

The First Mountain Man series (1991–2019) by William W. Johnstone, sees the leading character "Preacher" wielding a Hawken rifle, as his primary arm, in every entry.

The State of Missouri designated the Hawken the official firearm of the state on July 6, 2023 following the adoption of SB139 by receiving Governor Mike Parson's signature.
