= Andrew K. Campbell =

- Born: January 1, 1828; Virginia, USA
- Died: May 12, 1867 (aged 39); Paris, Illinois
- Burial place: Paris, Illinois
- Military career
- Allegiance: United States of America; Union
- Branch: United States Army; Union Army
- Service years: 1861–65
- Rank: Lieutenant Colonel
- Commands: 66th Illinois Volunteer Infantry Regiment
- Conflicts: American Civil War: Battle of Fort Donelson; Battle of Atlanta
- Other work: merchant, tailor

Andrew K. Campbell (1828–1867) was a Union Army officer during the American Civil War, and the last official commanding officer of the 66th Illinois Volunteer Infantry Regiment.

== Pre-war activities ==
Campbell was born in Virginia in 1828, and eventually moved to Terre Haute, Indiana. There he married Eliza J. Henbest.

Later he moved to Paris, Illinois, where he pursued a career as a tailor. Correspondence in the files of the Adjutant General of Illinois, in the Illinois State Archives indicates that he was active in politics.

== Civil War ==
From August to September, 1861, he helped raise a company of men for military service, and reported to Benton Barracks at St. Louis, Missouri, for induction. He was appointed captain of Company E, Birge's Western Sharpshooters (later, the 66th Illinois).

From December 1861, to February 3, 1862, he participated in the north central Missouri campaign. On February 4, 1862, with the rest of the regiment, Campbell embarked by steamboat, and was transported by river, finally disembarking at Fort Henry, Tennessee. From there, Campbell and regiment marched to Fort Donelson, where the regiment participated in the Battle of Fort Donelson. Later the next month, the regiment fought in the Battle of Shiloh on April 6–7, 1862, although Campbell was not present.

The regiment participated in the Corinth Campaign, and served as provost guard in Corinth, Mississippi, after the Confederate commander, Gen. P.G.T. Beauregard evacuated the city on the evening of May 29–30, 1862.

In early October, a combined Confederate Army under Maj. Gen. Earl Van Dorn and Maj. Gen. Sterling Price attempted to recapture the city. The Western Sharpshooter fought a bitter skirmish, on October 4, 1862, the second day of Second Battle of Corinth against elements of the Confederate Missouri Brigade in the timber in front of the Federal lines. Col. Thomas W. Sweeny commander of the 52nd Illinois Infantry who observed the fight, declared that the Sharpshooters "fought like heroes". Captain Campbell was not present for the battle. The regiment was transferred to Illinois state control on November 20, 1862.

On April 29, 1863 (promotion accepted May 23, 1863), Campbell was promoted to major of the regiment by order of Illinois Governor Richard Yates for his "gallant conduct" at the battles of Shiloh and Second Corinth.

Campbell was not able to join his regiment in many of the battles of the Atlanta campaign having been transferred to General Sweeny's staff. Captain William S. Boyd (Company A) carried out field command of the regiment during most of this period.

Campbell was present at Decatur, Georgia, on July 22, 1864, where he was wounded. On September 15, 1864, Governor Yates promoted Campbell to lieutenant colonel. He was mustered out with the regiment on July 7, 1865.

== Post-war life ==
Campbell returned to Paris, Illinois, where he died on May 12, 1867.
