= Jacob and Samuel Hawken =

Jacob Hawken
- Born: 1786
- Died: 1849 (aged 62–63)
- Occupation: Gunsmith
- Known for: Co-designer of the Hawken rifle

Samuel Hawken
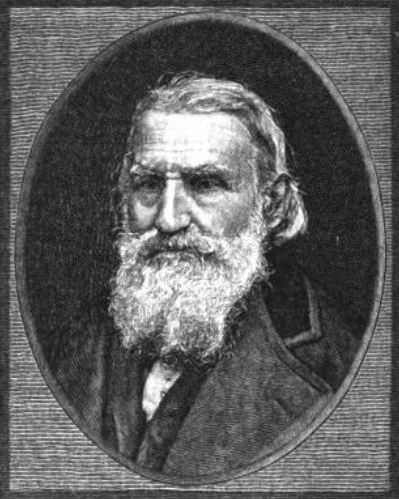
- Born: October 26, 1792; Hagerstown, Maryland
- Died: May 8, 1884 (aged 91); St. Louis, Missouri
- Burial place: Bellefontaine Cemetery
- Occupation: Gunsmith
- Known for: Co-designer of the Hawken rifle

Jacob and Samuel Hawken were American gunsmiths and traders who operated from their shop in St. Louis, Missouri from 1825 to 1855. They are famous for designing the "plains rifle" named after them (the Hawken rifle).

== History ==
Born in Hagerstown, Maryland, Jacob (born 1786) and Samuel (born October 26, 1792) were brought up by their father, Christian Hawken, to become gunsmiths. Despite the fact that local folklore sets the establishment of their shop in 1807 the evidence suggests that Jacob worked for the Harpers Ferry Armory from 1808 until at least 1818, when he moved to Missouri and bought 160 acres (0.65 km^{2}) of land in New Madrid. His brothers, John, Joseph and George Hawken also were listed as employed by Harper's Ferry up until the early months of 1818. Jacob also entered into a partnership with a St. Louis, Missouri gunsmith named James Lakenan which lasted until the latter's death on August 25, 1825.

Samuel Hawken served in the Maryland militia during the War of 1812. After the war he moved to Ohio and established his own enterprise in Xenia, Ohio. After the death of his wife and father, he relocated to St. Louis, where he formed a fresh business, separate to that of Lakenan and his older brother. James worked supplying guns to the American Fur Company. The Hawkens became partners, however, after Lakenan's death in 1825.

Their shop, though it excelled in gun-smithing, was also a bastion of old-fashioned craftsmanship; for up until 1848, they repaired and restocked tools as well as firearms and produced brass axes, tomahawks, gun worms and even basket-style hilts for swords. As well as Lakenan, the Hawken brothers also devoted to acquiring and developing land.

Jacob Hawken died in 1849 (his burial location is unknown) and Samuel continued with the business on his own. In 1855, he retired and passed the shop to his son William, and William's business partner Tristram Campbell.

Samuel Hawken died on May 8, 1884, at the age of 91, in St. Louis. He was buried at Bellefontaine Cemetery.
