= August 27 =

August 27 this year in various calendars
- Thursday, 27 August 2026
Akan	Foyaw
Armenian	8 Hoṙi 1476
Aztec	Atemoztli 9, 9 Ōlīn
Babylonian	13 Abu, 2337 SE
Balinese pawukon	Luang, Pepet, Pasah, Jaya, Umanis, Tungleh, Wraspati of Matal, Kala, Urungan, Duka
Bengali	12 Bhadro, BS 1433
Chinese	Yin Water Rooster・Dipper Mansion; Fire Horse Year, Month 7, Day 15 (Chushu, 11 days until Bailu)
Common Era	27 August 2026 CE
Coptic	21 Mesori, AM 1742
Egyptian	13 Tybi, 2775 NE
Ethiopian	21 Naḥasē, 2018 Amätä Məhrät
French Republican	Décade I, Décadi de Fructidor de l'Année 234 de la République
Gregorian	27 August, AD 2026
Hebrew	14 Elul, AM 5786
Hindu	Dhaniṣṭhā・Śobhana; Solar: 11 Bhādrapada, 1948 SE; Lunisolar: Caturdaśī, Śukla pakṣa of Śrāvaṇa, 2083 VE; Rāudra・5127 KY・1,872,814
Icelandic	Fimmtudagur, 3 Tvímánuður 2026
Islamic	13 Rabi' al-awwal, AH 1448 (using tabular method)
ISO week date	2026-W35-4
Japanese	15 Fumizuki, Reiwa 8 (Shosho, 11 days until Hakuro)
Julian	14 August, AD 2026 (AM 7534)
Julian day	2461280
Korean	15 Wonsungidal, 4359 DE
Maya	13.0.13.15.17; 10 Mol, 9 Caban
Roman	ante diem XIX Kalendas Septembres, MMDCCLXXIX AUC
Solar Hijri	5 Shahrivar, SH 1405
Tibetan	14 lhag gro bzhin, me pho rta 2153 or 1772 or 1000

<<	August					>>
Su	Mo	Tu	We	Th	Fr	Sa
						1
2	3	4	5	6	7	8
9	10	11	12	13	14	15
16	17	18	19	20	21	22
23	24	25	26	27	28	29
30	31
2026

August 27 in recent years
2026 (Thursday)
2025 (Wednesday)
2024 (Tuesday)
2023 (Sunday)
2022 (Saturday)
2021 (Friday)
2020 (Thursday)
2019 (Tuesday)
2018 (Monday)
2017 (Sunday)

August 27 is the 239th day of the year (240th in leap years) in the Gregorian calendar; 126 days remain until the end of the year.

== Events ==
=== Pre-1600 ===
- 410 – The sacking of Rome by the Visigoths ends after three days.
- 1172 – Henry the Young King and Margaret of France are crowned junior king and queen of England.
- 1232 – Shikken Hojo Yasutoki of the Kamakura shogunate promulgates the Goseibai Shikimoku, the first Japanese legal code governing the samurai class.
- 1353 – War of the Straits and Sardinian–Aragonese war: The Battle of Alghero results in a crushing victory of the allied Aragonese and Venetian fleet over the Genoese fleet, most of which is captured.
- 1557 – The Battle of St. Quentin results in Emmanuel Philibert becoming Duke of Savoy.
- 1593 – Pierre Barrière fails in an attempt to assassinate Henry IV of France.
- 1597 – Jeongyu War: Battle of Chilcheollyang: A Japanese fleet of 500 ships destroys Joseon commander Wŏn Kyun's fleet of 200 ships at Chilcheollyang.
- 1600 – Ishida Mitsunari's Western Army commences the Siege of Fushimi Castle, which is lightly defended by a much smaller Tokugawa garrison led by Torii Mototada.

=== 1601–1900 ===
- 1689 – The Treaty of Nerchinsk is signed by Russia and the Qing Empire (Julian calendar).
- 1776 – American Revolutionary War: British forces under General William Howe flank and defeat the Continental Army under General George Washington during the Battle of Long Island, with the 1st Maryland Regiment sustaining heavy casualties to cover retreating American troops.
- 1791 – French Revolution: Frederick William II of Prussia and Leopold II, Holy Roman Emperor, issue the Declaration of Pillnitz, declaring the joint support of the Holy Roman Empire and Prussia for the French monarchy, agitating the French revolutionaries and contributing to the outbreak of the War of the First Coalition.
- 1793 – French Revolutionary Wars: The city of Toulon revolts against the French Republic and admits the British and Spanish fleets to seize its port, leading to the Siege of Toulon by French Revolutionary forces.
- 1798 – Wolfe Tone's United Irish and French forces clash with the British Army in the Battle of Castlebar, part of the Irish Rebellion of 1798, resulting in the creation of the French puppet Republic of Connacht.
- 1810 – Napoleonic Wars: The French Navy defeats the British Royal Navy, preventing them from taking the harbour of Grand Port on Île de France.
- 1813 – French Emperor Napoleon I defeats a larger force of Austrians, Russians, and Prussians at the Battle of Dresden.
- 1828 – Brazil and Argentina recognize the sovereignty of Uruguay in the Treaty of Montevideo.
- 1832 – Black Hawk, leader of the Sauk tribe of Native Americans, surrenders to U.S. authorities, ending the Black Hawk War.
- 1859 – Petroleum is discovered in Titusville, Pennsylvania, leading to the world's first commercially successful oil well.
- 1881 – The Georgia hurricane makes landfall near Savannah, Georgia, resulting in an estimated 700 deaths.
- 1883 – Eruption of Krakatoa: Four enormous explosions almost completely destroy the island of Krakatoa, with a combination of tsunamis and pyroclastic flows killing more than 36,000. Climate effects are observed worldwide.
- 1893 – The Sea Islands hurricane strikes the United States near Savannah, Georgia, killing between 1,000 and 2,000 people.
- 1895 – Japanese invasion of Taiwan: Battle of Baguashan: The Empire of Japan decisively defeats a smaller Formosan army at Changhua, crippling the short-lived Republic of Formosa and leading to its surrender two months later.
- 1896 – Anglo-Zanzibar War: The shortest war in world history (09:02 to 09:40) occurs, between the United Kingdom and Zanzibar.

=== 1901–present ===
- 1908 – The Qing dynasty promulgates the Qinding Xianfa Dagang, the first constitutional document in the history of China, transforming the Qing empire into a constitutional monarchy.
- 1914 – World War I: Battle of Étreux: A British rearguard action by the Royal Munster Fusiliers during the Great Retreat.
- 1914 – World War I: Siege of Tsingtao: A Japanese fleet commanded by Vice Admiral Sadakichi Kato imposes a blockade along the whole coastline of German Tsingtao, initiating the Siege of Tsingtao.
- 1915 – Attempted assassination of Bishop Patrick Heffron, bishop of the Diocese of Winona, by Rev. Louis M. Lesches.
- 1916 – World War I: The Kingdom of Romania declares war on Austria-Hungary, entering the war as one of the Allied nations.
- 1918 – Mexican Revolution: Battle of Ambos Nogales: U.S. Army forces skirmish against Mexican Carrancistas as part of the Mexican Border War.
- 1922 – Greco-Turkish War: The Turkish army takes the Aegean city of Afyonkarahisar from the Kingdom of Greece.
- 1927 – Five Canadian women file a petition to the Supreme Court of Canada, asking: "Does the word 'Persons' in Section 24 of the British North America Act, 1867, include female persons?"
- 1928 – The Kellogg–Briand Pact outlawing war is signed by fifteen nations. Ultimately sixty-one nations will sign it.
- 1933 – The first Afrikaans Bible is introduced during a Bible Festival in Bloemfontein.
- 1939 – First flight of the turbojet-powered Heinkel He 178, the world's first jet aircraft.
- 1942 – The Holocaust: first day of the Sarny Massacre, perpetrated by German military forces.
- 1943 – World War II: Japanese forces evacuate New Georgia Island in the Pacific Theater of Operations during World War II.
- 1943 – World War II: Aerial bombardment by the Luftwaffe razes to the ground the village of Vorizia in Crete.
- 1955 – The first edition of the Guinness Book of Records is published in Great Britain.
- 1956 – The nuclear power station at Calder Hall in the United Kingdom was connected to the national power grid becoming the world's first commercial nuclear power station to generate electricity on an industrial scale.
- 1962 – The Mariner 2 unmanned space mission is launched to Venus by NASA.
- 1963 – An explosion at the Cane Creek potash mine near Moab, Utah kills 18 miners.
- 1964 – South Vietnamese junta leader Nguyễn Khánh enters into a triumvirate power-sharing arrangement with rival generals Trần Thiện Khiêm and Dương Văn Minh, who had both been involved in plots to unseat Khánh.
- 1971 – An attempted coup d'état fails in the African nation of Chad. The Government of Chad accuses Egypt of playing a role in the attempt and breaks off diplomatic relations.
- 1975 – The Governor of Portuguese Timor abandons its capital, Dili, and flees to Atauro Island, leaving control to a rebel group.
- 1979 – The Troubles: Eighteen British soldiers are killed at the Warrenpoint ambush by the Provisional Irish Republican Army near Warrenpoint, Northern Ireland, in the deadliest attack on British forces during Operation Banner. An IRA bomb also kills British royal family member Lord Mountbatten and three others on his boat at Mullaghmore, Republic of Ireland.
- 1980 – South Korean presidential election: After successfully staging the Coup d'état of May Seventeenth, General Chun Doo-hwan, running unopposed, has the National Conference for Unification elect him President of the Fourth Republic of Korea.
- 1982 – Turkish military diplomat Colonel Atilla Altıkat is shot and killed in Ottawa. Justice Commandos of the Armenian Genocide claim to be avenging the massacre of 1 1/2 million Armenians in the 1915 Armenian genocide.
- 1985 – Major General Muhammadu Buhari, Chairman of the Supreme Military Council of Nigeria, is ousted from power in a coup d'état led by Major General Ibrahim Babangida.
- 1985 – Space Shuttle Discovery is launched on STS-51-I to deploy three communication satellites and repair a fourth malfunctioning one.
- 1991 – The European Community recognizes the independence of the Baltic states of Estonia, Latvia and Lithuania.
- 1991 – Moldova declares independence from the USSR.
- 1992 – Aeroflot Flight 2808 crashes in Lebyazhy Lug during approach to Ivanovo Yuzhny Airport, killing all 84 aboard.
- 2003 – Mars makes its closest approach to Earth in nearly 60,000 years, passing 34,646,418 miles (55,758,005 km) distant.
- 2003 – The first six-party talks, involving South and North Korea, the United States, China, Japan and Russia, convene to find a peaceful resolution to the security concerns of the North Korean nuclear weapons program.
- 2006 – Comair Flight 5191 crashes on takeoff from Blue Grass Airport in Lexington, Kentucky, bound for Hartsfield–Jackson Atlanta International Airport in Atlanta. Of the passengers and crew, 49 of 50 are confirmed dead in the hours following the crash.
- 2009 – Internal conflict in Myanmar: The Burmese military junta and ethnic armies begin three days of violent clashes in the Kokang Special Region.
- 2011 – Hurricane Irene strikes the United States east coast, killing 47 and causing an estimated $15.6 billion in damage.

== Births ==
=== Pre-1600 ===
- 865 – Rhazes, Persian polymath (died 925)
- 1407 – Ashikaga Yoshikazu, Japanese shōgun (died 1425)
- 1471 – George, Duke of Saxony (died 1539)
- 1487 – Anna of Brandenburg (died 1514)
- 1512 – Friedrich Staphylus, German theologian (died 1564)
- 1542 – John Frederick, Duke of Pomerania and Protestant Bishop of Cammin (died 1600)
- 1545 – Alexander Farnese, Duke of Parma (died 1592)

=== 1601–1900 ===
- 1624 – Koxinga, Chinese-Japanese Ming loyalist (died 1662)
- 1637 – Charles Calvert, 3rd Baron Baltimore, English politician, 2nd Proprietor of Maryland (died 1715)
- 1665 – John Hervey, 1st Earl of Bristol, English politician (died 1751)
- 1669 – Anne Marie d'Orléans, queen of Sardinia (died 1728)
- 1677 – Otto Ferdinand von Abensberg und Traun, Austrian general (died 1748)
- 1724 – John Joachim Zubly, Swiss-American pastor, planter, and politician (died 1781)
- 1730 – Johann Georg Hamann, German philosopher and author (died 1788)
- 1770 – Georg Wilhelm Friedrich Hegel, German philosopher and academic (died 1831)
- 1785 – Agustín Gamarra, Peruvian general and politician, 10th and 14th President of Peru (died 1841)
- 1795 – Giorgio Mitrovich, Maltese politician (died 1885)
- 1803 – Edward Beecher, American minister and theologian (died 1895)
- 1809 – Hannibal Hamlin, American publisher and politician, 15th Vice President of the United States (died 1891)
- 1812 – Bertalan Szemere, Hungarian poet and politician, 3rd Prime Minister of Hungary (died 1869)
- 1822 – William Hayden English, American politician, U.S. Representative from Indiana and Democratic vice-presidential nominee (died 1896)
- 1827 – Charles Lilley, English-Australian politician, 4th Premier of Queensland (died 1897)
- 1835 – Thomas Burberry, British fashion designer, founder of luxury brand Burberry, and inventor of gabardine (died 1926)
- 1845 – Ödön Lechner, Hungarian architect, designed the Museum of Applied Arts and the Church of St Elisabeth (died 1914)
- 1845 – Friedrich Martens, Estonian-Russian historian, lawyer, and diplomat (died 1909)
- 1856 – Ivan Franko, Ukrainian author and poet (died 1916)
- 1858 – Giuseppe Peano, Italian mathematician and philosopher (died 1932)
- 1864 – Hermann Weingärtner, German gymnast (died 1919)
- 1865 – James Henry Breasted, American archaeologist and historian (died 1935)
- 1865 – Charles G. Dawes, American general and politician, 30th Vice President of the United States, Nobel Prize laureate (died 1951)
- 1868 – Hong Beom-do, Korean general and activist (died 1943)
- 1870 – Amado Nervo, Mexican journalist, poet, and diplomat (died 1919)
- 1871 – Theodore Dreiser, American novelist and journalist (died 1945)
- 1874 – Carl Bosch, German chemist and engineer, Nobel Prize laureate (died 1940)
- 1875 – Katharine McCormick, American biologist, philanthropist, and activist (died 1967)
- 1877 – Charles Rolls, English engineer and businessman, co-founded Rolls-Royce Limited (died 1910)
- 1877 – Ernst Wetter, Swiss lawyer and politician, 48th President of the Swiss Confederation (died 1963)
- 1878 – Pyotr Nikolayevich Wrangel, Russian general (died 1928)
- 1884 – Vincent Auriol, French lawyer and politician, President of the French Republic (died 1966)
- 1884 – Denis G. Lillie, British biologist, member of the 1910–1913 Terra Nova Expedition (died 1963)
- 1886 – Rebecca Clarke, English viola player and composer (died 1979)
- 1890 – Man Ray, American-French photographer and painter (died 1976)
- 1895 – Andreas Alföldi, Hungarian archaeologist and historian (died 1981)
- 1896 – Kenji Miyazawa, Japanese author and poet (died 1933)
- 1898 – Gaspard Fauteux, Canadian businessman and politician, 19th Lieutenant Governor of Quebec (died 1963)
- 1899 – C. S. Forester, English novelist (died 1966)

=== 1901–present ===
- 1904 – Alar Kotli, Estonian architect (died 1963)
- 1904 – Norah Lofts, English author (died 1983)
- 1904 – John Hay Whitney, American businessman, publisher, and diplomat, founded J.H. Whitney & Company (died 1982)
- 1905 – Aris Velouchiotis, Greek soldier (died 1945)
- 1906 – Ed Gein, American murderer and body snatcher, The Butcher of Plainfield (died 1982)
- 1906 – Edmund Wojtyła, Polish doctor (died 1932)
- 1908 – Don Bradman, Australian cricketer and manager (died 2001)
- 1908 – Lyndon B. Johnson, American commander and politician, 36th President of the United States (died 1973)
- 1909 – Sylvère Maes, Belgian cyclist (died 1966)
- 1909 – Charles Pozzi, French race car driver (died 2001)
- 1909 – Lester Young, American saxophonist and clarinet player (died 1959)
- 1911 – Kay Walsh, English actress and dancer (died 2005)
- 1912 – Gloria Guinness, Mexican journalist (died 1980)
- 1915 – Norman Foster Ramsey Jr., American physicist and academic, Nobel Prize laureate (died 2011)
- 1916 – Gordon Bashford, English engineer, co-designed the Range Rover (died 1991)
- 1916 – Tony Harris, South African cricketer and rugby player (died 1993)
- 1916 – Martha Raye, American actress and comedian (died 1994)
- 1917 – Peanuts Lowrey, American baseball player, coach, and manager (died 1986)
- 1918 – Jelle Zijlstra, Dutch economist and politician, Prime Minister of the Netherlands (died 2001)
- 1919 – Pee Wee Butts, American baseball player and coach (died 1972)
- 1919 – Murray Grand, American singer-songwriter and pianist (died 2007)
- 1920 – Baptiste Manzini, American football player (died 2008)
- 1920 – James Molyneaux, Baron Molyneaux of Killead, Northern Irish soldier and politician (died 2015)
- 1921 – Georg Alexander, Duke of Mecklenburg (died 1996)
- 1921 – Leo Penn, American actor, director, and screenwriter (died 1998)
- 1922 – Roelof Kruisinga, Dutch physician and politician, Minister of Defence for The Netherlands (died 2012)
- 1923 – Jimmy Greenhalgh, English footballer and manager (died 2013)
- 1924 – David Rowbotham, Australian journalist and poet (died 2010)
- 1924 – Rosalie E. Wahl, American lawyer and jurist (died 2013)
- 1925 – Andrea Cordero Lanza di Montezemolo, Italian cardinal (died 2017)
- 1925 – Nat Lofthouse, English footballer and manager (died 2011)
- 1925 – Saiichi Maruya, Japanese author and critic (died 2012)
- 1925 – Bill Neilson, Australian politician, 34th Premier of Tasmania (died 1989)
- 1925 – Jaswant Singh Neki, Indian poet and academic (died 2015)
- 1925 – Carter Stanley, American bluegrass singer-songwriter and guitarist (died 1966)
- 1926 – George Brecht, American-German chemist and composer (died 2008)
- 1926 – Kristen Nygaard, Norwegian computer scientist and academic (died 2002)
- 1928 – Péter Boross, Hungarian lawyer and politician, 54th Prime Minister of Hungary
- 1928 – Mangosuthu Buthelezi, South African politician, Chief Minister of KwaZulu (died 2023)
- 1928 – Joan Kroc, American philanthropist (died 2003)
- 1929 – Ira Levin, American novelist, playwright, and songwriter (died 2007)
- 1929 – George Scott, Canadian-American wrestler and promoter (died 2014)
- 1930 – Aase Foss Abrahamsen, Norwegian writer (died 2023)
- 1930 – Gholamreza Takhti, Iranian wrestler and politician (died 1968)
- 1931 – Sri Chinmoy, Indian-American guru and poet (died 2007)
- 1931 – Joe Cunningham, American baseball player and coach (died 2021)
- 1932 – Cor Brom, Dutch footballer and manager (died 2008)
- 1932 – Antonia Fraser, English historian and author
- 1935 – Ernie Broglio, American baseball player (died 2019)
- 1935 – Michael Holroyd, English author
- 1935 – Frank Yablans, American screenwriter and producer (died 2014)
- 1936 – Joel Kovel, American scholar and author (died 2018)
- 1936 – Lien Chan, Taiwanese politician, Vice President of the Republic of China
- 1937 – Alice Coltrane, American pianist and composer (died 2007)
- 1937 – J.D. Crowe, American bluegrass banjo player and bandleader (The New South) (died 2021)
- 1937 – Tommy Sands, American pop singer and actor
- 1939 – William Least Heat-Moon, American travel writer and historian
- 1939 – Edward Patten, American singer-songwriter and producer (died 2005)
- 1939 – Nikola Pilić, Yugoslav tennis player and coach (died 2025)
- 1940 – Fernest Arceneaux, American singer and accordion player (died 2008)
- 1940 – Sonny Sharrock, American guitarist (died 1994)
- 1941 – Cesária Évora, Cape Verdean singer (died 2011)
- 1941 – János Konrád, Hungarian water polo player and swimmer (died 2014)
- 1941 – Harrison Page, American actor
- 1942 – Daryl Dragon, American keyboard player and songwriter (died 2019)
- 1942 – Brian Peckford, Canadian educator and politician, 3rd Premier of Newfoundland and Labrador
- 1943 – Chuck Girard, American singer-songwriter and pianist
- 1943 – Bob Kerrey, American lieutenant and politician, Medal of Honor recipient, 35th Governor of Nebraska
- 1943 – Tuesday Weld, American model and actress
- 1944 – G. W. Bailey, American actor
- 1944 – Tim Bogert, American singer and bass player (died 2021)
- 1945 – Douglas R. Campbell, Canadian lawyer and judge
- 1945 – Marianne Sägebrecht, German actress
- 1946 – Tony Howard, Barbadian cricketer and manager
- 1947 – Barbara Bach, American actress and model
- 1947 – Halil Berktay, Turkish historian and academic
- 1947 – Kirk Francis, American engineer and producer
- 1947 – Peter Krieg, German director, producer, and screenwriter (died 2009)
- 1947 – John Morrison, New Zealand cricketer and politician
- 1947 – Gavin Pfuhl, South African cricketer and sportscaster (died 2002)
- 1948 – John Mehler, American drummer
- 1948 – Sgt. Slaughter, American wrestler
- 1948 – Deborah Swallow, English historian and curator
- 1948 – Philippe Vallois, French director and screenwriter
- 1949 – Jeff Cook, American singer-songwriter and guitarist (died 2022)
- 1949 – Leah Jamieson, American computer scientist, engineer, and academic
- 1949 – Ann Murray, Irish soprano
- 1950 – Charles Fleischer, American comedian and actor
- 1950 – Neil Murray, Scottish bass player and songwriter
- 1950 – Edmund Weiner, English lexicographer and author
- 1951 – Buddy Bell, American baseball player and manager
- 1951 – Mack Brown, American football player and coach
- 1951 – Randall Garrison, American-Canadian criminologist and politician
- 1952 – Paul Reubens, American actor and comedian (died 2023)
- 1953 – Tom Berryhill, American businessman and politician (died 2020)
- 1953 – Alex Lifeson, Canadian singer-songwriter, guitarist, and producer
- 1953 – Joan Smith, English journalist and author
- 1953 – Peter Stormare, Swedish actor, director, and playwright
- 1954 – John Lloyd, English tennis player and sportscaster
- 1954 – Rajesh Thakker, English physician and academic
- 1954 – Derek Warwick, English race car driver
- 1955 – Robert Richardson, American cinematographer
- 1955 – Diana Scarwid, American actress
- 1956 – Glen Matlock, English singer-songwriter and bass player
- 1957 – Jeff Grubb, American game designer and author
- 1957 – Bernhard Langer, German golfer
- 1958 – Kathy Hochul, first female Governor of New York
- 1958 – Sergei Krikalev, Russian engineer and astronaut
- 1958 – Tom Lanoye, Belgian author, poet, and playwright
- 1958 – Hugh Orde, British police officer
- 1959 – Gerhard Berger, Austrian race car driver
- 1959 – Juan Fernando Cobo, Colombian painter and sculptor
- 1959 – Leila de Lima, Filipino politician, lawyer, human rights activist and law professor
- 1959 – Denice Denton, American engineer and academic (died 2006)
- 1959 – Frode Fjellheim, Norwegian pianist and composer
- 1959 – András Petőcz, Hungarian author and poet
- 1959 – Daniela Romo, Mexican singer, actress and TV hostess
- 1959 – Jeanette Winterson, English journalist and novelist
- 1961 – Yolanda Adams, American singer, producer, and actress
- 1961 – Mark Curry, English television host and actor
- 1961 – Tom Ford, American fashion designer and film director
- 1961 – Steve McDowall, New Zealand rugby player
- 1961 – Helmut Winklhofer, German footballer
- 1962 – Adam Oates, Canadian ice hockey player
- 1963 – Nguyễn Phương Nga,Vietnamese diplomat
- 1964 – Stephan Elliott, Australian actor, director, and screenwriter
- 1964 – Paul Bernardo, Canadian serial rapist and murderer
- 1965 – Scott Dibble, American lawyer and politician
- 1965 – Wayne James, Zimbabwean cricketer and coach
- 1965 – Ange Postecoglou, Greek-Australian footballer and coach
- 1966 – Jeroen Duyster, Dutch rower
- 1966 – René Higuita, Colombian footballer
- 1966 – Juhan Parts, Estonian lawyer and politician, 14th Prime Minister of Estonia
- 1967 – Ogie Alcasid, Filipino singer-songwriter, producer, and actor
- 1967 – Rob Burnett, American football player and sportscaster
- 1968 – Eric "Bobo" Correa, American musician
- 1968 – Daphne Koller, Israeli-American computer scientist and academic
- 1968 – Michael Long, New Zealand golfer
- 1968 – Matthew Ridge, New Zealand rugby player and sportscaster
- 1969 – Mark Ealham, English cricketer
- 1969 – Avril Haines, American lawyer, and 1st female Director of National Intelligence
- 1969 – Cesar Millan, Mexican-American dog trainer, television personality, and author
- 1969 – Reece Shearsmith, English actor, comedian and writer
- 1969 – Chandra Wilson, American actress and director
- 1970 – Andy Bichel, Australian cricketer and coach
- 1970 – Mark Ilott, English cricketer
- 1970 – Tony Kanal, British-American bass player. songwriter, and record producer
- 1970 – Jim Thome, American baseball player and manager
- 1970 – Karl Unterkircher, Italian mountaineer (died 2008)
- 1971 – Ernest Faber, Dutch footballer and manager
- 1971 – Kyung Lah, South Korean-American journalist
- 1971 – Hisayuki Okawa, Japanese runner
- 1971 – Aygül Özkan, German lawyer and politician
- 1972 – Jaap-Derk Buma, Dutch field hockey player
- 1972 – The Great Khali, Indian professional wrestler
- 1972 – Denise Lewis, English heptathlete
- 1972 – Jimmy Pop, American singer-songwriter and guitarist
- 1972 – Pokwang, Filipino comedian, actress, television host and singer
- 1973 – Danny Coyne, Welsh footballer
- 1973 – Dietmar Hamann, German footballer and manager
- 1973 – Burak Kut, Turkish singer-songwriter
- 1973 – Johan Norberg, Swedish historian and author
- 1974 – Aaron Downey, Canadian ice hockey player and coach
- 1974 – Manny Fernandez, Canadian ice hockey player
- 1974 – Michael Mason, New Zealand cricketer
- 1974 – José Vidro, Puerto Rican-American baseball player
- 1974 – Mohammad Yousuf, Pakistani cricketer
- 1975 – Blake Adams, American golfer
- 1975 – Mase, American rapper, songwriter and pastor
- 1975 – Jonny Moseley, Puerto Rican-American skier and television host
- 1975 – Marko Rudan, Australian footballer and manager
- 1976 – Sarah Chalke, Canadian actress
- 1976 – Audrey C. Delsanti, French astronomer and biologist
- 1976 – Milano Collection A.T., Japanese wrestler
- 1976 – Carlos Moyá, Spanish-Swiss tennis player
- 1976 – Elena Reygadas, Mexican chef
- 1976 – Mark Webber, Australian race car driver
- 1977 – Deco, Brazilian-Portuguese footballer
- 1977 – Justin Miller, American baseball player (died 2013)
- 1978 – Demetria McKinney, American actress and singer
- 1979 – Sarah Neufeld, Canadian violinist
- 1979 – Aaron Paul, American actor and producer
- 1979 – Karel Rachůnek, Czech ice hockey player (died 2011)
- 1979 – Rusty Smith, American speed skater
- 1981 – Patrick J. Adams, Canadian actor
- 1981 – Maxwell Cabelino Andrade, Brazilian footballer
- 1981 – Chantal Djotodia, Beninese-Central African nurse and politician
- 1981 – Alessandro Gamberini, Italian footballer
- 1981 – Karla Mosley, American actress
- 1983 – Joanna McGilchrist, English rugby player and physiotherapist
- 1984 – David Bentley, English footballer
- 1984 – Amanda Fuller, American actress
- 1984 – Sulley Muntari, Ghanaian footballer
- 1985 – Kayla Ewell, American actress
- 1985 – Kevan Hurst, English footballer
- 1985 – Nikica Jelavić, Croatian footballer
- 1985 – Alexandra Nechita, Romanian-American painter and sculptor
- 1986 – Lana Bastašić, Serbian-Bosnian author and translator
- 1986 – Sebastian Kurz, Austrian politician, 25th Chancellor of Austria
- 1986 – Mario, American singer and actor
- 1987 – Darren McFadden, American football player
- 1988 – Alexa PenaVega, American actress and singer
- 1989 – Romain Amalfitano, French footballer
- 1989 – Juliana Cannarozzo, American figure skater and actress
- 1990 – Tori Bowie, American athlete (died 2023)
- 1990 – Luuk de Jong, Dutch footballer
- 1991 – Lee Sung-yeol, South Korean actor and singer
- 1992 – Blake Jenner, American actor and singer
- 1992 – Stephen Morris, American football player
- 1992 – Kim Petras, German singer-songwriter
- 1992 – Ayame Goriki, Japanese actress and singer
- 1993 – Sarah Hecken, German figure skater
- 1993 – Olivier Le Gac, French cyclist
- 1994 – Ellar Coltrane, American actor
- 1994 – Breanna Stewart, American basketball player
- 1995 – Jessie Mei Li, English actress
- 1995 – Sergey Sirotkin, Russian race car driver
- 1997 – Lucas Paquetá, Brazilian footballer
- 1998 – Kevin Huerter, American basketball player
- 1998 – Matheus Nunes, Portuguese footballer
- 1998 – Rod Wave, American rapper, singer, and songwriter
- 1998 – Brandon Hagel, Canadian ice hockey player
- 2001 – Franz Wagner, German basketball player
- 2006 – Kang Ju-hyeok, South Korean footballer
- 2007 – Ariana Greenblatt, American actress

== Deaths ==
=== Pre-1600 ===
- 542 – Caesarius of Arles, French bishop and saint (born 470)
- 749 – Qahtaba ibn Shabib al-Ta'i, Persian general
- 827 – Pope Eugene II
- 923 – Ageltrude, queen of Italy and Holy Roman Empress
- 1146 – King Eric III of Denmark
- 1255 – Little Saint Hugh of Lincoln (born 1247)
- 1312 – Arthur II, Duke of Brittany (born 1261)
- 1394 – Emperor Chōkei of Japan (born 1343)
- 1450 – Reginald West, 6th Baron De La Warr, English politician (born 1395)
- 1521 – Josquin des Prez, Flemish composer (born 1450)
- 1545 – Piotr Gamrat, Polish archbishop (born 1487)
- 1576 – Titian, Italian painter and educator (born 1488)
- 1590 – Pope Sixtus V (born 1521)

=== 1601–1900 ===
- 1611 – Tomás Luis de Victoria, Spanish composer (born c. 1548)
- 1635 – Lope de Vega, Spanish poet and playwright (born 1562)
- 1664 – Francisco de Zurbarán, Spanish painter and educator (born 1598)
- 1748 – James Thomson, Scottish poet and playwright (born 1700)
- 1782 – John Laurens, American Revolutionary and abolitionist (born 1754)
- 1828 – Eise Eisinga, Dutch astronomer and academic, built the Eisinga Planetarium (born 1744)
- 1857 – Rufus Wilmot Griswold, American anthologist, poet, and critic (born 1815)
- 1865 – Thomas Chandler Haliburton, Canadian judge and politician (born 1796)
- 1871 – William Whiting Boardman, American lawyer and politician (born 1794)
- 1875 – William Chapman Ralston, American businessman and financier, founded the Bank of California (born 1826)
- 1891 – Samuel C. Pomeroy, American businessman and politician (born 1816)

=== 1901–present ===
- 1903 – Kusumoto Ine, first Japanese female doctor of Western medicine (born 1827)
- 1909 – Emil Christian Hansen, Danish physiologist and mycologist (born 1842)
- 1922 – Reşat Çiğiltepe, Turkish colonel (born 1879)
- 1929 – Herman Potočnik, Croatian-Austrian engineer (born 1892)
- 1931 – Frank Harris, Irish-American journalist and author (born 1856)
- 1931 – Willem Hubert Nolens, Dutch priest and politician (born 1860)
- 1931 – Francis Marion Smith, American miner and businessman (born 1846)
- 1935 – Childe Hassam, American painter and academic (born 1859)
- 1944 – Georg von Boeselager, German soldier (born 1915)
- 1945 – Hubert Pál Álgyay, Hungarian engineer, designed the Petőfi Bridge (born 1894)
- 1948 – Charles Evans Hughes, American lawyer and politician, 11th Chief Justice of the United States (born 1862)
- 1950 – Cesare Pavese, Italian author, poet, and critic (born 1908)
- 1956 – Pelageya Shajn, Russian astronomer and academic (born 1894)
- 1958 – Ernest Lawrence, American physicist and academic, Nobel Prize laureate (born 1901)
- 1963 – W. E. B. Du Bois, American sociologist, historian, and activist (born 1868)
- 1963 – Inayatullah Khan Mashriqi, Pakistani mathematician and scholar (born 1888)
- 1964 – Gracie Allen, American actress and comedian (born 1895)
- 1965 – Le Corbusier, Swiss-French architect and urban planner, designed the Philips Pavilion (born 1887)
- 1967 – Brian Epstein, English businessman and manager (born 1934)
- 1968 – Princess Marina of Greece and Denmark (born 1906)
- 1969 – Ivy Compton-Burnett, English author (born 1884)
- 1969 – Erika Mann, German actress and author (born 1905)
- 1971 – Bennett Cerf, American publisher, co-founded Random House (born 1898)
- 1971 – Margaret Bourke-White, American photographer and journalist (born 1906)
- 1975 – Haile Selassie, Ethiopian emperor (born 1892)
- 1978 – Gordon Matta-Clark, American painter and illustrator (born 1943)
- 1978 – Ieva Simonaitytė, Lithuanian author and poet (born 1897)
- 1978 – Helmi Üprus, Estonian art historian (born 1911)
- 1979 – Louis Mountbatten, 1st Earl Mountbatten of Burma, English admiral and politician, 44th Governor-General of India (born 1900)
- 1980 – Douglas Kenney, American actor, producer, and screenwriter (born 1947)
- 1981 – Valeri Kharlamov, Russian ice hockey player (born 1948)
- 1990 – Avdy Andresson, Estonian soldier and diplomat (born 1899)
- 1990 – Stevie Ray Vaughan, American singer-songwriter, guitarist, and producer (born 1954)
- 1992 – Bengt Holbek, Danish folklorist (born 1933)
- 1994 – Frank Jeske, German footballer (born 1960)
- 1996 – Greg Morris, American actor (born 1933)
- 1998 – Essie Summers, New Zealand author (born 1912)
- 1999 – Hélder Câmara, Brazilian archbishop and theologian (born 1909)
- 2001 – Michael Dertouzos, Greek-American computer scientist and academic (born 1936)
- 2001 – Abu Ali Mustafa, Palestinian politician (born 1938)
- 2002 – Edwin Louis Cole, American religious leader and author (born 1922)
- 2003 – Pierre Poujade, French soldier and politician (born 1920)
- 2004 – Willie Crawford, American baseball player (born 1946)
- 2005 – Giorgos Mouzakis, Greek trumpet player and composer (born 1922)
- 2005 – Seán Purcell, Irish footballer (born 1929)
- 2006 – Hrishikesh Mukherjee, Indian director, producer, and screenwriter (born 1922)
- 2006 – Jesse Pintado, Mexican-American guitarist (born 1969)
- 2007 – Emma Penella, Spanish actress (born 1930)
- 2009 – Sergey Mikhalkov, Russian author and poet (born 1913)
- 2010 – Anton Geesink, Dutch martial artist (born 1934)
- 2010 – Luna Vachon, Canadian-American wrestler and manager (born 1962)
- 2012 – Neville Alexander, South African linguist and activist (born 1936)
- 2012 – Malcolm Browne, American journalist and photographer (born 1931)
- 2012 – Art Heyman, American basketball player (born 1941)
- 2012 – Ivica Horvat, Croatian footballer and manager (born 1926)
- 2012 – Richard Kingsland, Australian captain and pilot (born 1916)
- 2012 – Geliy Korzhev, Russian painter (born 1925)
- 2013 – Chen Liting, Chinese director and playwright (born 1910)
- 2013 – Bill Peach, Australian journalist (born 1935)
- 2013 – Dave Thomas, Welsh golfer and architect (born 1934)
- 2014 – Jacques Friedel, French physicist and academic (born 1921)
- 2014 – Valeri Petrov, Bulgarian poet, playwright, and screenwriter (born 1920)
- 2014 – Benno Pludra, German author (born 1925)
- 2015 – Kazi Zafar Ahmed, Bangladeshi politician, 8th Prime Minister of Bangladesh (born 1939)
- 2015 – Pascal Chaumeil, French director and screenwriter (born 1961)
- 2015 – Darryl Dawkins, American basketball player and coach (born 1957)
- 2016 – Cookie, Australian Major Mitchell's cockatoo, oldest recorded parrot (born 1933)
- 2024 – Bob Carr, American politician (born 1943)
- 2024 – Juan Izquierdo, Uruguayan footballer (born 1997)
- 2024 – Charlotte Kretschmann, German supercentenarian (born 1909)
- 2024 – Leonard Riggio, American businessman (born 1941)
- 2026 – Ratko Mladić, Bosnian Serb military officer and war criminal (born 1942)
- 2026 – Rukidi IV of Tooro, 13th Omukama of Tooro (born 1992)

== Holidays and observances ==
- Christian feast day:
  - Baculus of Sorrento
  - Caesarius of Arles
  - David Lewis
  - Decuman
  - Gebhard of Constance
  - Euthalia
  - John of Pavia
  - Lycerius (or: Glycerius, Lizier)
  - Máel Ruba (or Rufus) (Scotland)
  - Margaret the Barefooted
  - Monica of Hippo, mother of Augustine of Hippo
  - Narnus
  - Our Lady of La Vang
  - Phanourios of Rhodes
  - Rufus and Carpophorus
  - Syagrius of Autun
  - Thomas Gallaudet and Henry Winter Syle (Episcopal Church)
  - August 27 (Eastern Orthodox liturgics)
- Independence Day (Republic of Moldova), celebrates the independence of Moldova from the USSR in 1991.
- Lyndon Baines Johnson Day (Texas, United States)
