= Aeroflot Flight 2808 =

1992 aviation accident

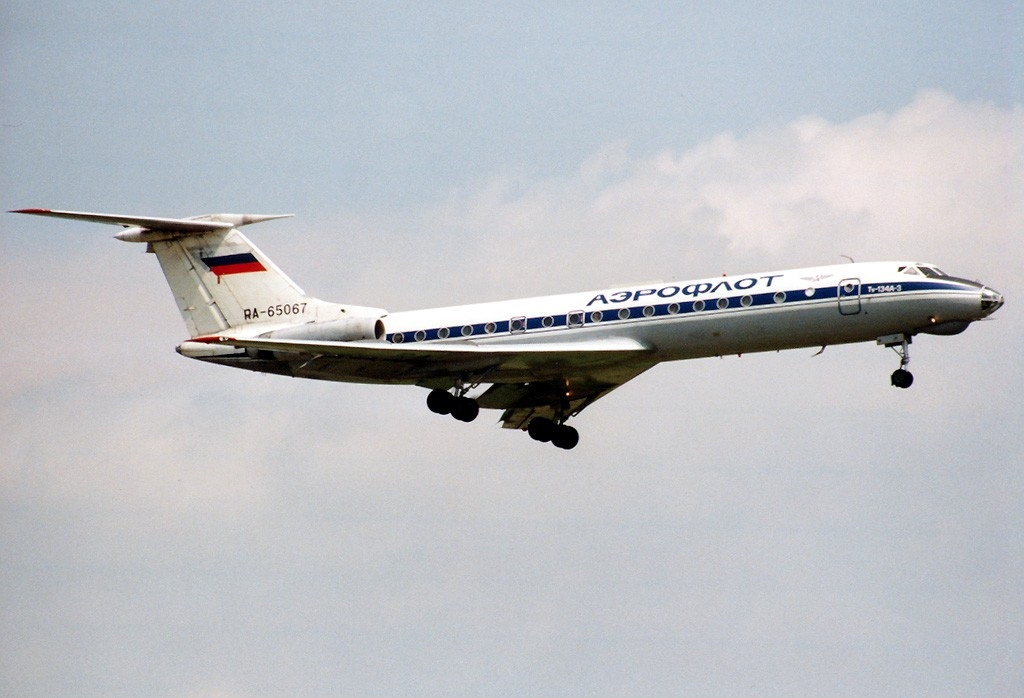
- An Aeroflot Tupolev Tu-134, similar to the one involved in the accident

Accident
- Date: 27 August 1992
- Summary: Crew and ATC errors
- Site: Lebyazhy Lug, Ivanovo Oblast, Russia 56°55′29″N 40°59′20″E

Aircraft
- Aircraft type: Tupolev Tu-134A
- Operator: Aeroflot
- Registration: RA-65058
- Flight origin: Mineralnye Vody Airport, Russia
- Stopover: Donetsk International Airport, Ukraine
- Destination: Ivanovo Yuzhny Airport, Russia
- Occupants: 84
- Passengers: 77
- Crew: 7
- Fatalities: 84
- Survivors: 0

Aeroflot Flight 2808 was a scheduled domestic passenger flight from Mineralnye Vody to Ivanovo, both in Russia, with a stopover in Donetsk, Ukraine on 27 August 1992. While attempting to land at Ivanovo airport, the Tupolev Tu-134 crashed into a group of buildings in the village of Lebyazhy Lug. Investigators determined the cause of the accident was errors made by the crew and the air traffic controller. There were no fatalities on the ground, but all 84 people on board the flight died in the crash.

== Aircraft ==
The aircraft involved in the accident was a Tupolev Tu-134A registered RA-65058 to Aeroflot. (Note: Some sources report the aircraft registration as CCCP-65058 instead of RA-65058, likely because the crash happened shortly after the division of the USSR.) At the time of the accident, the aircraft had sustained 26,307 flight hours and 16,388 pressurization cycles.

== Crew ==
The cockpit crew consisted of the following:

- Captain Vladimir Nikolayevich Gruzdev (Владимир Николаевич Груздев)
- Co-pilot Vasiliy Yuryevich Gruzdev (Василий Юрьевич Груздев)
- Flight engineer Mikhail Gennadievich Karlov (Михаил Геннадьевич Карлов)
- Flight engineer instructor Yuri Mikhailovich Eremenko (Юрий Михайлович Ерёменко)
- Navigator Mikhail Anatolevich Konovalov (Михаил Анатольевич Коновалов)

The two flight attendants in the cabin were Svetlana Ermilova (Светлана Ермилова) and Tatiana Mokrova (Татьяна Мокрова).

== Synopsis ==
The second phase of the flight took off from Donetsk at 21:03 Moscow Time. On board the aircraft were the seven crew members and 77 passengers, of whom 21 were children. No issues in flight from Donetsk were reported. At 22:27 and at an altitude of 10,100 metres (33,100 ft) the flight began to descend 6,000 metres (20,000 ft) on a bearing of 60° in preparation for the approach, which was to be carried out by the pilot in command. The decrease in altitude occurred approximately 100 kilometres (62 mi; 54 nmi) from the airport and approximately 40 kilometres (25 mi; 22 nmi) from the point where the flight was due to turn for the approach. After the descent the flight remained at its current altitude for two minutes at a speed of 440 km/h (240 kn; 270 mph).

After the Tu-134 passed Dobrynskoe as designated by air traffic control, while at a distance of 75 kilometres (47 mi; 40 nmi) from the airport, the crew contacted the air traffic controller who gave them permission to descend to an altitude of 1,800 metres (5,900 ft) and set them on a bearing of 292° for landing. At 22:39:20 the flight reported to be 28 kilometres (17 mi; 15 nmi) from the airport and at an altitude of 1,800 metres (5,900 ft) when they were actually at an altitude of 2,000 metres (6,600 ft). As instructed the flight flew level for 25 seconds, decreasing airspeed from 580 to 525 km/h (313 to 283 kn; 360 to 326 mph). At 22:39:40 while 25 kilometres (16 mi) from the airport the controller gave the flight permission to descend to 1,500 metres (4,900 ft) and transferred the flight to another controller in the tower. When communications with the new controller began the flight reported their altitude to be 1,500 metres (4,900 ft) and proceeded with level flight for 25 seconds.

When the flight was 2.5 kilometres (1.6 mi) to the right of the cut-off point of the glideslope they requested permission to enter landing mode. The flight, having deviated 9 kilometers from the route, had reached the transition level at 22:40. Upon receiving permission to reduce their altitude to 500 metres (1,600 ft) and execute a fourth turn at 20°, they flight executed the procedure through a transition level of 1,200 metres (3,900 ft) and a 17 kilometres (11 mi) radial distance. The flight was then 3 kilometres (1.9 mi) from the aerodrome and flying at a speed of 450 km/h (240 kn; 280 mph) when it had still not deployed the landing gear; in the preparations for landing the navigator forgot to set his altimeter to the correct pressure. During the third turn the aircraft reduced speed to 390 km/h (210 kn; 240 mph) at a consistent altitude. During the beginning of fourth turn the landing gear was released and the flaps adjusted only when the aircraft was 2.6 kilometres (1.6 mi) from the glideslope, while at an altitude of 1,200 metres (3,900 ft) and a speed of 410 km/h (220 kn; 250 mph). The fourth turn started with a roll of 20° at a distance of 12.5 kilometres (7.8 mi) from the entrance to the runway; due to previous lateral deviations the roll would have had to reach 30° in order to proceed with the route.

At 22:41 the air traffic controller informed the flight crew of weather conditions with visibility being 1,200 meters and mild fog. Having lost two minutes of needed time to execute the planned route, there was not enough time to sufficiently reduce speed to 330 km/h (180 kn; 210 mph), adjust flaps to 20°, and reach an altitude of 500 metres (1,600 ft) safely to continue with the landing. Nevertheless, the crew continued with the landing and the air traffic controller did not give the crew any warnings. The aircraft exited the fourth turn at a distance of 8.6 kilometres (5.3 mi) from the entrance to the runway with a speed of 390 km/h (210 kn; 240 mph) and an altitude 100 metres (330 ft) above the limit but with the stabilizer, flaps and slats in the correct positions. At a distance of 7.5 kilometres (4.7 mi) from the runway and an altitude of 320 metres (1,050 ft) the navigator picked up on the deviation and asked the captain about correcting the deviation to which the captain initially refused. While descending to the glidepath at an altitude of 270 metres (890 ft) the copilot corrected the left bank by adjusting the horizontal stabilizer in one procedure (changing the stabilizer required fulfilling three procedures); doing so caused the aircraft to become less stable.

At a distance of 4.5 kilometres (2.8 mi) from the runway, the aircraft held a lateral deviation ranging from 200–300 metres (660–980 ft) and an altitude of 200 metres (660 ft). To enter the glidepath, the captain began to turn to the right causing the aircraft to roll up to 35°. The procedure was carried out in an uncoordinated fashion, causing the vertical speed to increase to up to 15–16 m/s (3,000–3,100 ft/min). After passing the Non-directional beacon at an altitude of 170 m (560 ft) (which should have been 210 metres (690 ft)) while 40 metres (130 ft) to the left of the correct position relative to the runway, the navigator again warned the captain but was ignored. At an altitude of approximately 100 metres (330 ft) the captain attempted to take the aircraft out of the bank but did not attempt to slow down the vertical speed. After the navigator's last attempt to convince the captain to abort the landing and make a go-around, the aircraft banked sharply to the right 10°.

The aircraft struck foliage to its right at a distance of 2.9 kilometres (1.8 mi) from the start of the runway while on a bearing of 295° and 60 metres (200 ft) to the left of the intended path. The aircraft crashed into the ground 512 metres (1,680 ft; 560 yd) after first striking the trees; several brick buildings and cars were damaged by debris but no one on the ground was killed. All 84 passengers and crew were killed in the crash.

== Conclusions ==
Investigation showed that there were no mechanical issues with the aircraft itself and the aircraft was intact until it had crashed.

The primary cause of the accident was the captain's decision to continue the route under unsuitable parameters for landing. Insufficient crew communication and poor cockpit resource management also led to periodic loss of control compounded by failure to follow guidelines for maximum rate of descent as outlined in the Tu-134's flight manual.

The air traffic controller at Ivanovo airport acted in violation of aviation guidelines by not notifying the crew about their deviations from the course and glide path.

== See also ==
- Eastern Air Lines Flight 401— another case of flight deviating from intended route and crashing due to poor cockpit resource management.
- SAS Flight 933 — also crashed on approach due to pilot error
- Iberia Flight 062 — similar instance of crash into terrain
