= La Vang =

- Location in Vietnam
- Coordinates: 16°42′27.55″N 107°11′42.95″E
- Country: Vietnam
- Province: Quảng Trị Province

La Vang or Lavang is a location in Quảng Trị Province, Vietnam. It is the site of the Minor Basilica of a Roman Catholic Marian sanctuary, commemorating a vision of the Blessed Virgin Mary and her purported Marian apparition called Our Lady of La Vang in 1798.

Destroyed in 1972 during the Vietnam War, the site has been rebuilt on several occasions and is an important site of pilgrimage for Catholics in Vietnam and Overseas Vietnamese diaspora with many parishes bearing the namesake Marian title.

== The Shrine ==
The Apparition Shrine, which was the area where Our Lady appeared, had a recent renovation in 2008. Areas surrounding the shrine including the Main Sanctuary Gate, were renovated. The La Vang Boarding House was also recently constructed to accommodate the pilgrims.

== Our Lady of La Vang ==
(In Vietnamese:Đức Mẹ La Vang)

The tradition of Our Lady of La Vang dates back to the time when Catholics were executed in Vietnam. Many people sought refuge in the rain forest of La Vang, and many became very ill. They were praying when a lady appeared, wearing the traditional Vietnamese áo dài dress and holding a child in her arms, with two angels beside her. The people present interpreted the vision as the Virgin Mary and the infant Jesus Christ. They said that Our Lady comforted them and told them to boil leaves from the trees for medicine to cure the illness.

In 1961, the Catholic bishops of Vietnam selected the Church of La Vang as the National Sacred Marian Centre. In 1962, Pope John XXIII declared the Church the Basilica of La Vang. Though there is no official Vatican recognition of this event as a Marian apparition, on June 19, 1988, Pope John Paul II publicly recognized the importance of Our Lady of La Vang and expressed desire to rebuild the La Vang Basilica in commemoration of the 200th anniversary of the first vision. But Pope John Paul II affirmed that there has been no documentation in the Vatican of Our Lady's Apparitions in La Vang.
