= Dobrynskoye =

- IATA: none; ICAO: XUDD

Summary
- Airport type: Military
- Operator: Soviet Air Defence Forces
- Location: Dobrynskoye, Vladimir Oblast, Russia
- Elevation AMSL: 430 ft / 131 m
- Coordinates: 56°14′42″N 040°35′30″E
- Interactive map of Dobrynskoye

Runways
Direction	Length		Surface
Direction	ft	m	Surface
	8,202	2,500	Concrete

Dobrynskoye was a military air base in Vladimir Oblast, Russia. It is located near Dobrynskoye, 16 kilometers (9.9 mi) north-east of Vladimir. Dobrynskoye was an airfield of the Soviet Air Defence Forces housing fighter aircraft which appeared on aeronautical charts in the 1970s and 1980s. It housed the 145th (until 1964) and 157th Guards Fighter Aviation Regiments (until 1970). Then, later the 288th independent Helicopter Regiment of the Moscow Military District was at the base December 1976 - April 1978, and then the 361st Independent Helicopter Regiment from 1984 to 2007. In 1989 the regiment came under the control of the 344th Centre for Combat Employment and Retraining at Torzhok. In 2002 it was reduced to a squadron.

By the 1990s the airfield disappeared from the charts, and is now believed to be inactive and abandoned.
