= Gavin Pfuhl =

South African cricketer (1947–2002)

Personal information
- Full name: Gavin Pattison Pfuhl
- Born: 27 August 1947; Mowbray, Cape Town, Cape Province, South Africa
- Died: 1 April 2002 (aged 54); Cape Town, South Africa
- Batting: Right-handed
- Role: Wicket-keeper

Domestic team information
- Years: Team
- 1967-68 to 1979-80: Western Province

Career statistics
Competition	First-class	List A
Matches	95	21
Runs scored	2331	165
Batting average	21.58	18.33
100s/50s	1/9	0/0
Top score	117	47
Balls bowled	–	–
Wickets	–	–
Bowling average	–	–
5 wickets in innings	–	–
10 wickets in match	–	–
Best bowling	–	–
Catches/stumpings	280/34	36/5
- Source: Cricinfo, 26 September 2015

Gavin Pattison Pfuhl (27 August 1947 – 1 April 2002) was a South African first-class cricketer who played for Western Province. He was a wicketkeeper who took more than 300 dismissals in his 95-game career.

Pfuhl was a member of the Currie Cup-winning Western Province sides of 1969–70, 1974–75 and 1977–78.

After retiring he became a cricket commentator in South Africa. He died aged 54 after suffering a viral complication from a heart transplant.
