= Douglas R. Campbell =

Canadian judge (born 1945)

Judge of the Federal Court of Canada
- Incumbent
- Assumed office July 2, 2003

Personal details
- Born: August 27, 1945 (age 80) Calgary, Alberta

Douglas R. Campbell (born August 27, 1945) was a judge who served on the Federal Court of Canada. He was Canada's longest-serving judge, serving a total of 46 years.

He was appointed a judge on the Provincial Court of British Columbia at age 29 in 1974. In 1995 he was appointed to the Federal Court of Canada, where he served until his mandatory retirement at age 75 in 2020.
