= Our Lady of La Vang =

1798 reported Marian apparition in Vietnam

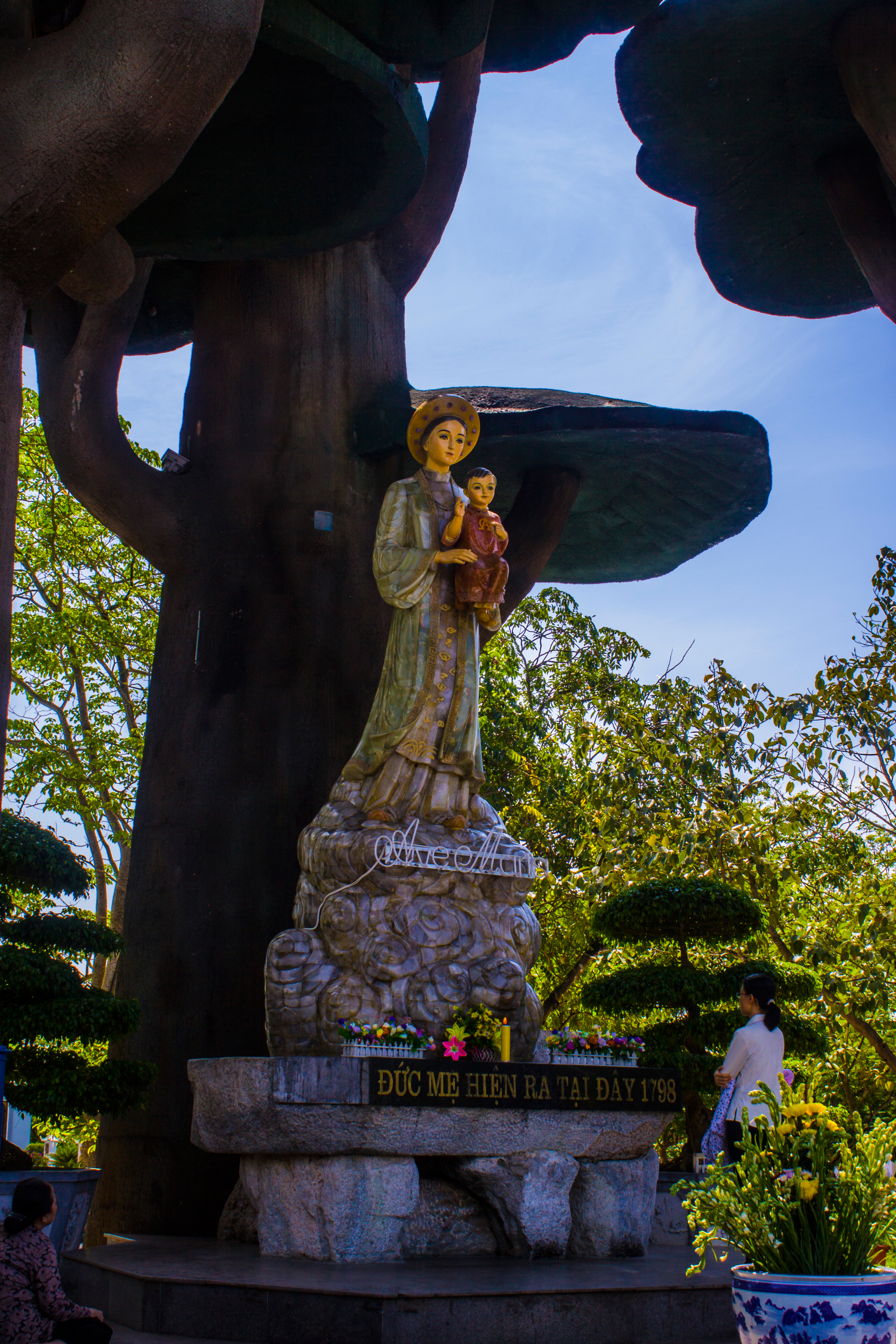
- Statue of Our Lady of La Vang at La Vang Basilica
- Location: La Vang, Vietnam
- Date: 17 August 1798
- Type: Marian apparition
- Approval: Not officially recognized by the Holy See
- Shrine: Basilica of Our Lady of La Vang, Vietnam
- Patronage: Vietnamese Catholics, Roman Catholic Archdiocese of Huế
- Feast day: 15 August; 27 August (Archdiocese of Huế)

Our Lady of La Vang (Vietnamese: Đức Mẹ La Vang) is a Roman Catholic title of the Blessed Virgin Mary associated with a purported Marian apparition during the persecution of Christians in Vietnam. The namesake shrine is located today in Hải Lăng District of Quảng Trị Province in Central Vietnam.

Pope John XXIII raised her shrine to the status of Minor Basilica via the decree Magno Nos Solacio on 22 August 1961. The decree was signed and notarized by Cardinal Angelo Dell'Acqua. The basilica was destroyed during the Vietnam War in 1972 and remains under re-construction to date.

== History ==
Fearing the spread of Catholic religion, the Emperor Cảnh Thịnh restricted the practice of Catholicism in the country in 1798. Soon thereafter, the emperor issued an anti-Catholic edict and persecution ensued.

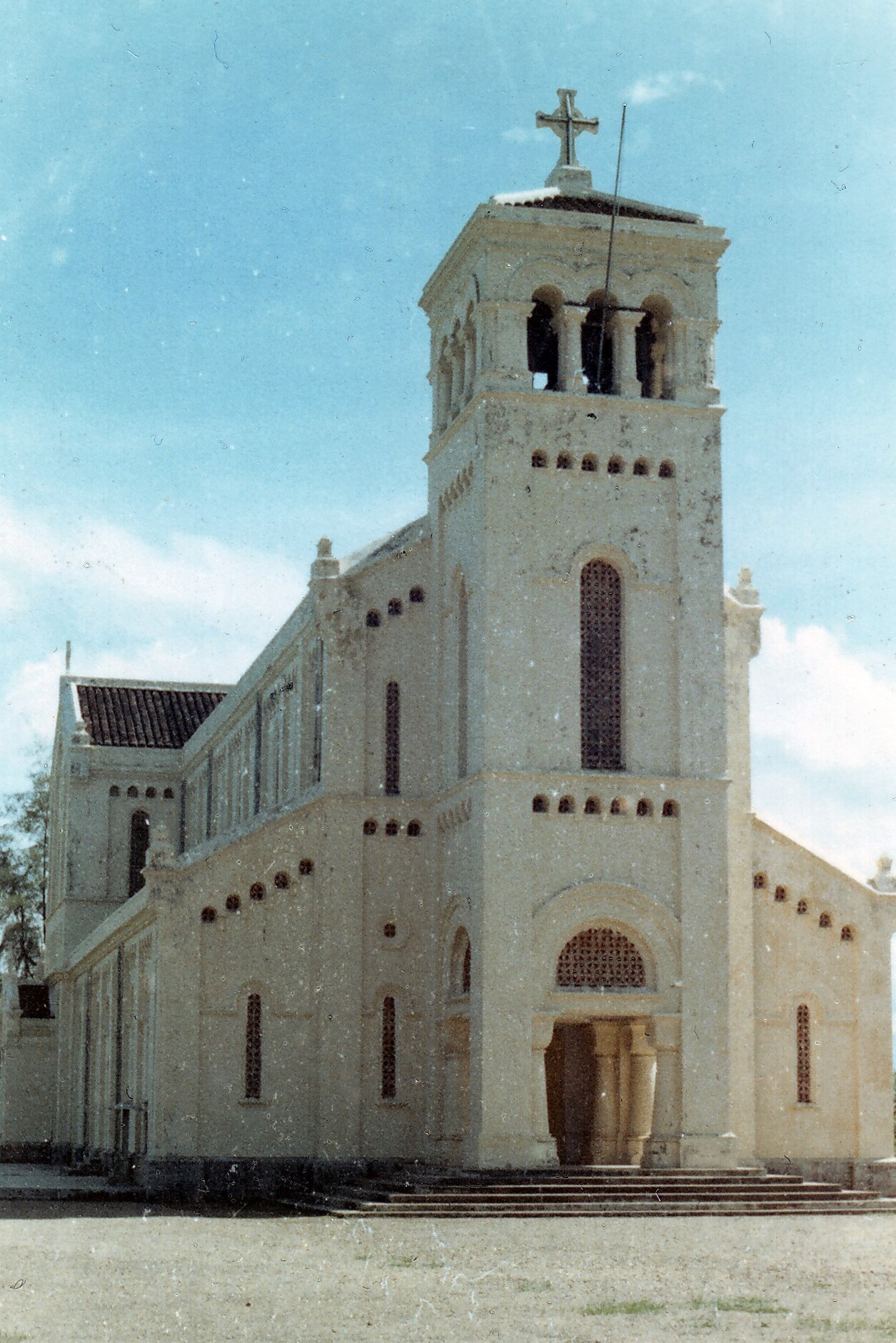
Church of Our Lady of La Vang, built in 1928 and destroyed in 1972 during the war

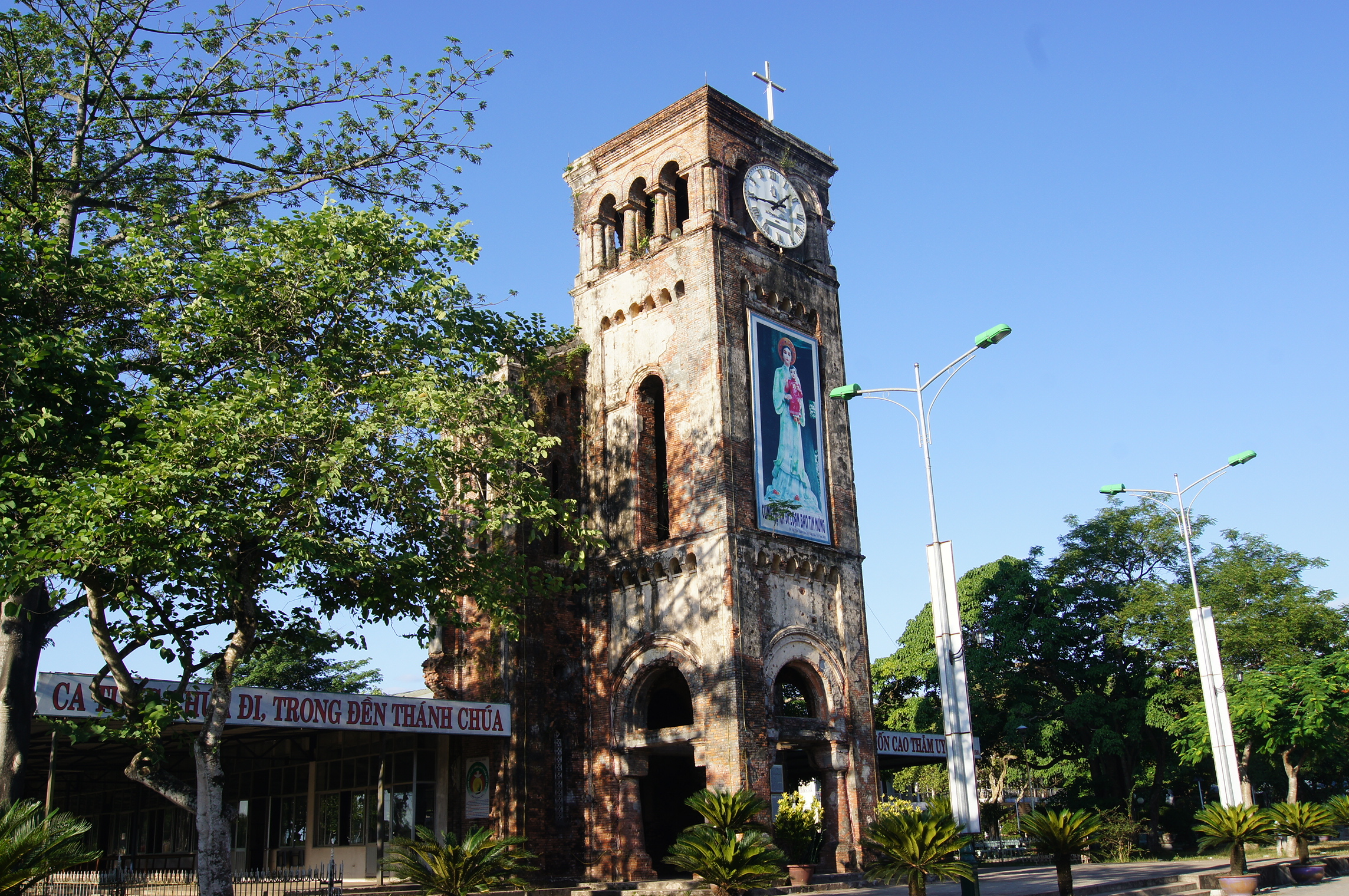
Destroyed Church of Our Lady of La Vang today

Many people sought refuge in the rainforest of La Vang in Quảng Trị Province, Vietnam, and many became very ill. While hiding in the jungle, the community gathered every night at the foot of a tree to pray the rosary. One night, an apparition surprised them. In the branches of the tree a lady appeared, wearing the traditional Vietnamese áo dài dress and holding a child in her arms, with two angels beside her. The people present interpreted the vision as the Virgin Mary and the Child Jesus. The natives claimed that Blessed Virgin Mary comforted them and told them to boil leaves from the trees for medicine to cure the illness. Legend states that the term "La Vang" was a derivative of the Vietnamese word meaning "crying out". Another hypothesis is that La Vang is distorted from the toponym Lá Vằng, lá meaning leaf and vằng meaning Jasminum nervosum, a tree species whose leaves are used to made a tisane; according to an ancient practice, a location was sometimes named after a prominent local species of plant or animal.

In 1802, the Catholics returned to their villages, passing on the story of the apparition in La Vang and its message. As the story of the apparition spread, many came to pray at this site and to offer incense. In 1820, a chapel was built.

From 1830 to 1885 another wave of persecutions decimated the Catholic population, during the height of which the chapel in honour of Our Lady of La Vang was destroyed. In 1886, construction on a new chapel began. Following its completion, Bishop Gaspar (Loc) consecrated the chapel in honour of Our Lady Help of Christians in 1901.

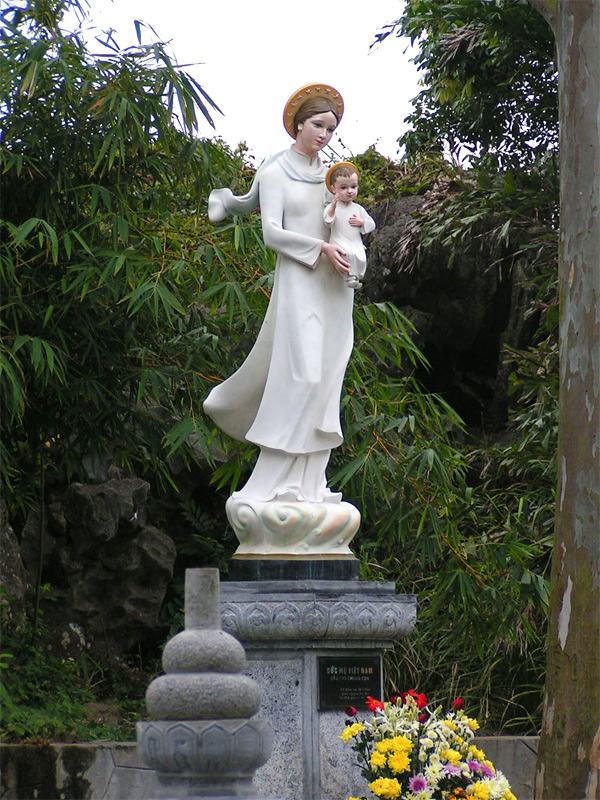
Statue of Our Lady of La Vang in Áo dài at Phát Diệm Cathedral

On 8 December 1954, the statue of Our Lady of La Vang was brought from Tri Bun back to the holy shrine. The Vietnamese Bishops Conference chose the church of Our Lady of La Vang as the National Shrine in honour of the Immaculate Conception. La Vang became the National Marian Center of Vietnam on 13 April 1961.

Pope John XXIII gifted a Papal candle to the shrine on 2 February 1960, which the Vietnamese Bishops inaugurated with a public procession on 25 March 1960. The same Pontiff later elevated the shrine to the rank of a minor basilica on 22 August 1961. A simple diocesan coronation and vesting of a Marian image was held the next year on 15 August 1962. Due to the political conflict involving both China and the United States, the image and the Papal candle was looted and the cathedral was destroyed again during the Vietnam War in 1972.

Though there is no official Vatican approbation of the purported Marian apparition, Pope John Paul II on 19 June 1998 publicly recognized the importance of Our Lady of La Vang and expressed his desire to rebuild the La Vang Basilica in commemoration of the 200th anniversary of the first vision.

With expressed permission from Pope Benedict XVI in 2012, the new basilica officially began construction with the endorsement from the Vietnamese government. A ceremony and Mass took place with the laying of the first cornerstone of the Basilica. The cornerstone was blessed the year prior by Cardinal Ivan Dias, Prefect of the Congregation for the Evangelization of Peoples and special envoy of Pope Benedict XVI during the Closing Mass of the Catholic Church in Vietnam's Jubilee Year that celebrated 50 years of the establishment of the episcopal hierarchy in Viet Nam.

In May 2022, the Archbishop of Hue, Joseph Nguyễn Chí Linh announced the dedication and consecration of the new basilica to take place during the La Vang congress in 2023, which happens from 14 to 15 August. As of June 2025, the new Basilica is still not completed due to many reasons. Subsequently, Archbishop Linh was appointed to oversee the construction of the Pilgrimage Center and Basilica.

In the Philippines, the Our Lady of La Vang Church at Viet Ville, Barangay Santa Lourdes in Puerto Princesa City in Palawan. Our Lady of La Vang has become a patroness of Puerto Princesa and patroness of Palawan. She was known as Inang Lala (Mother Lala).

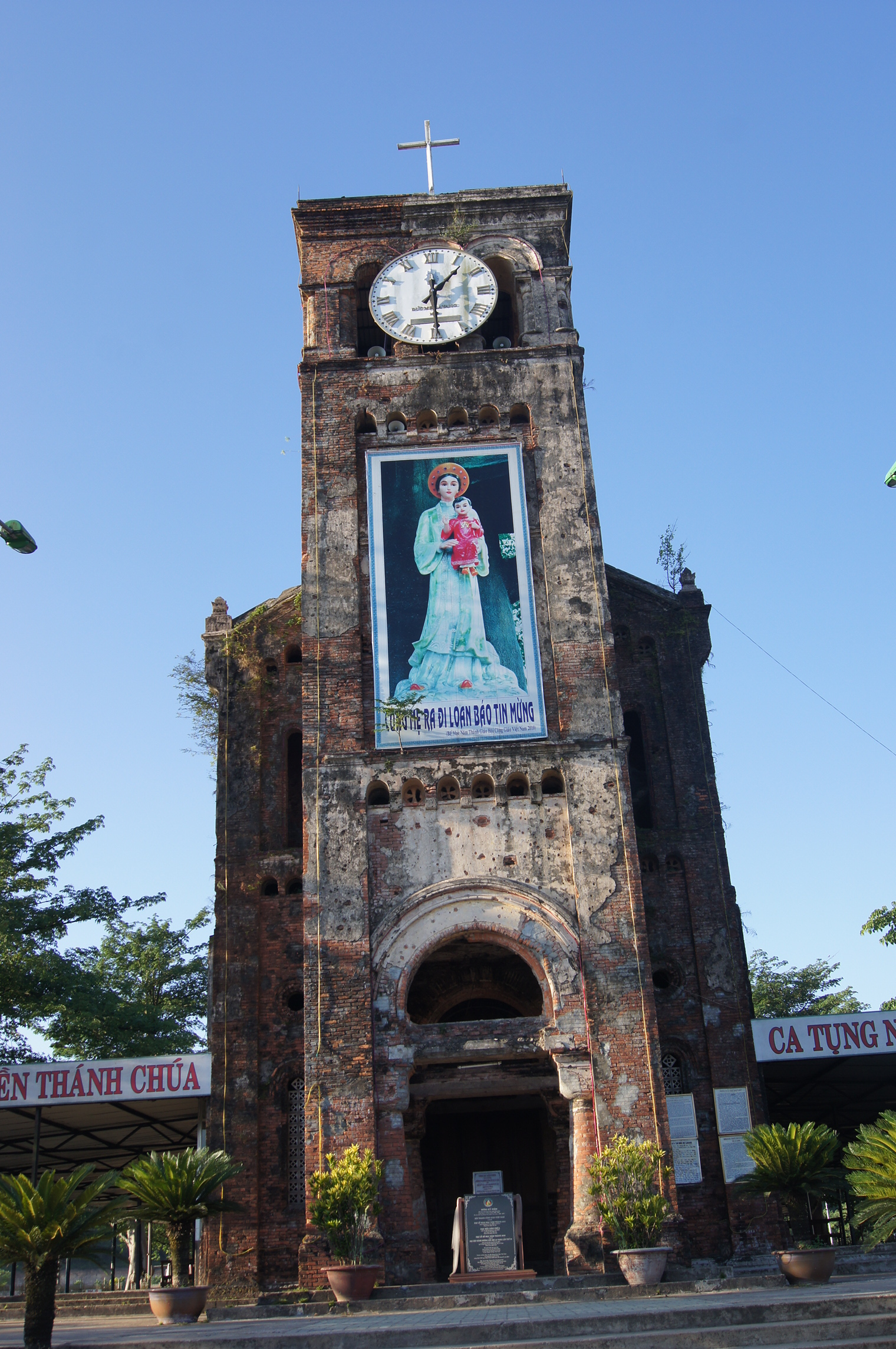

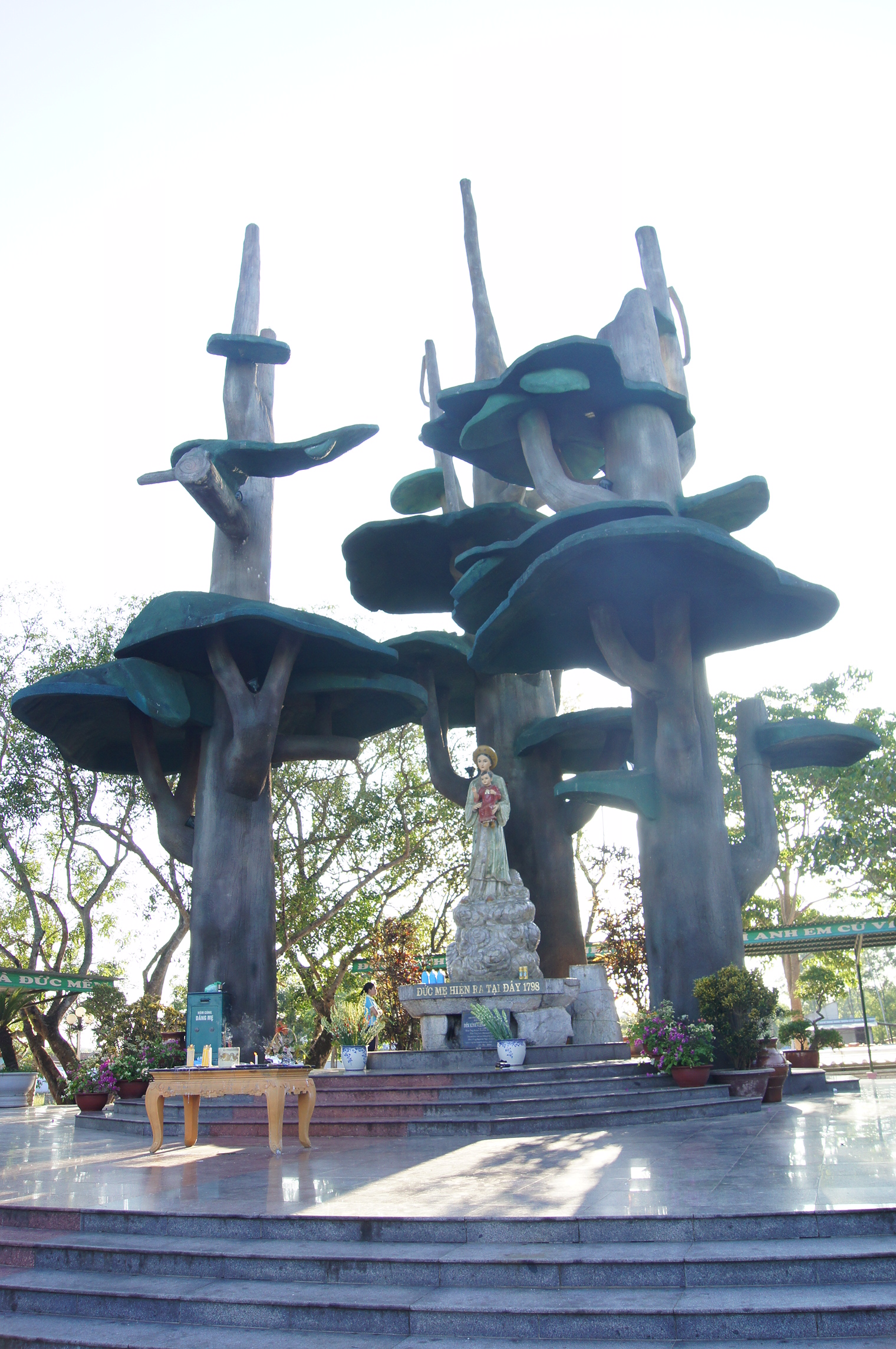

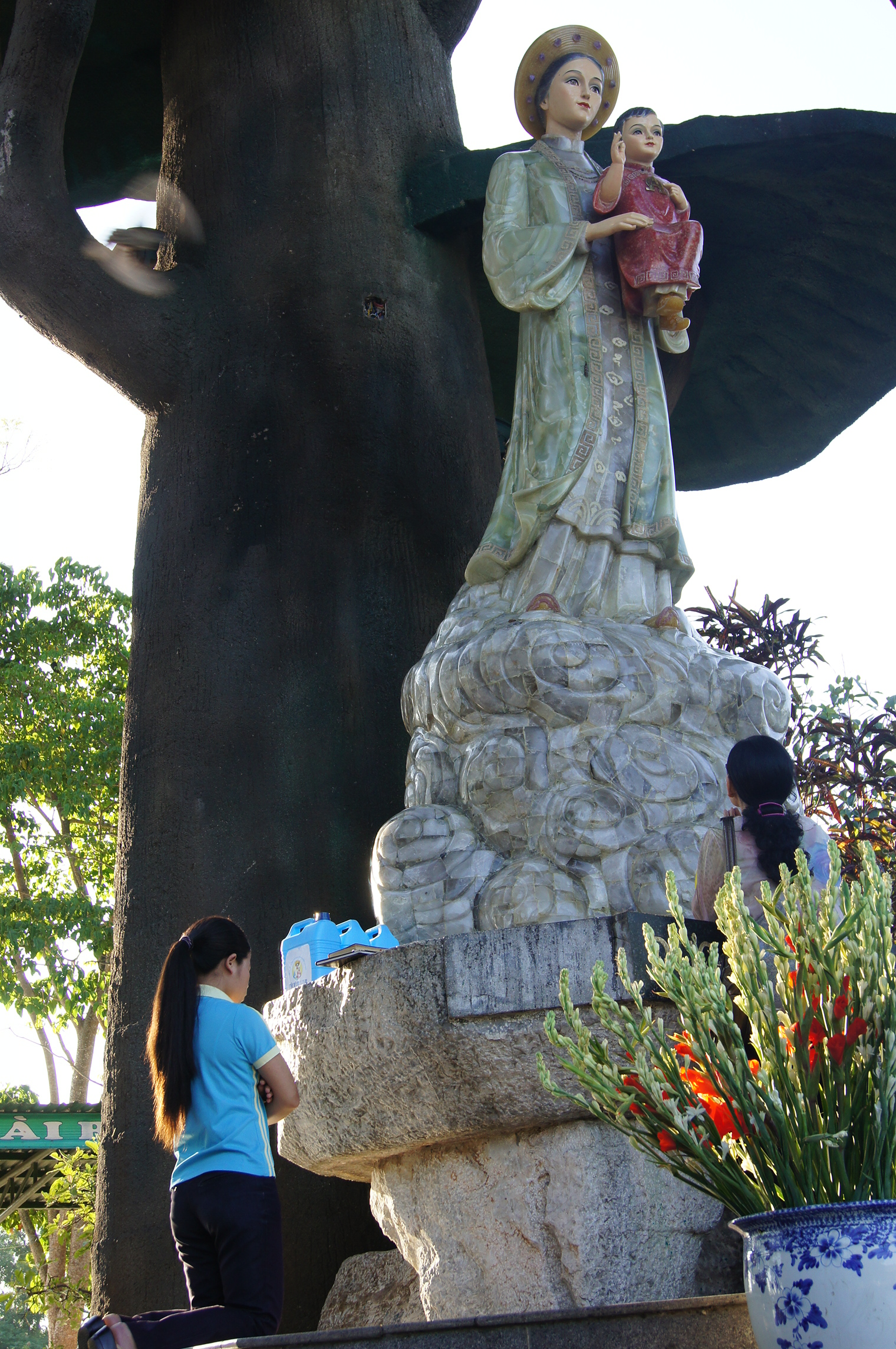

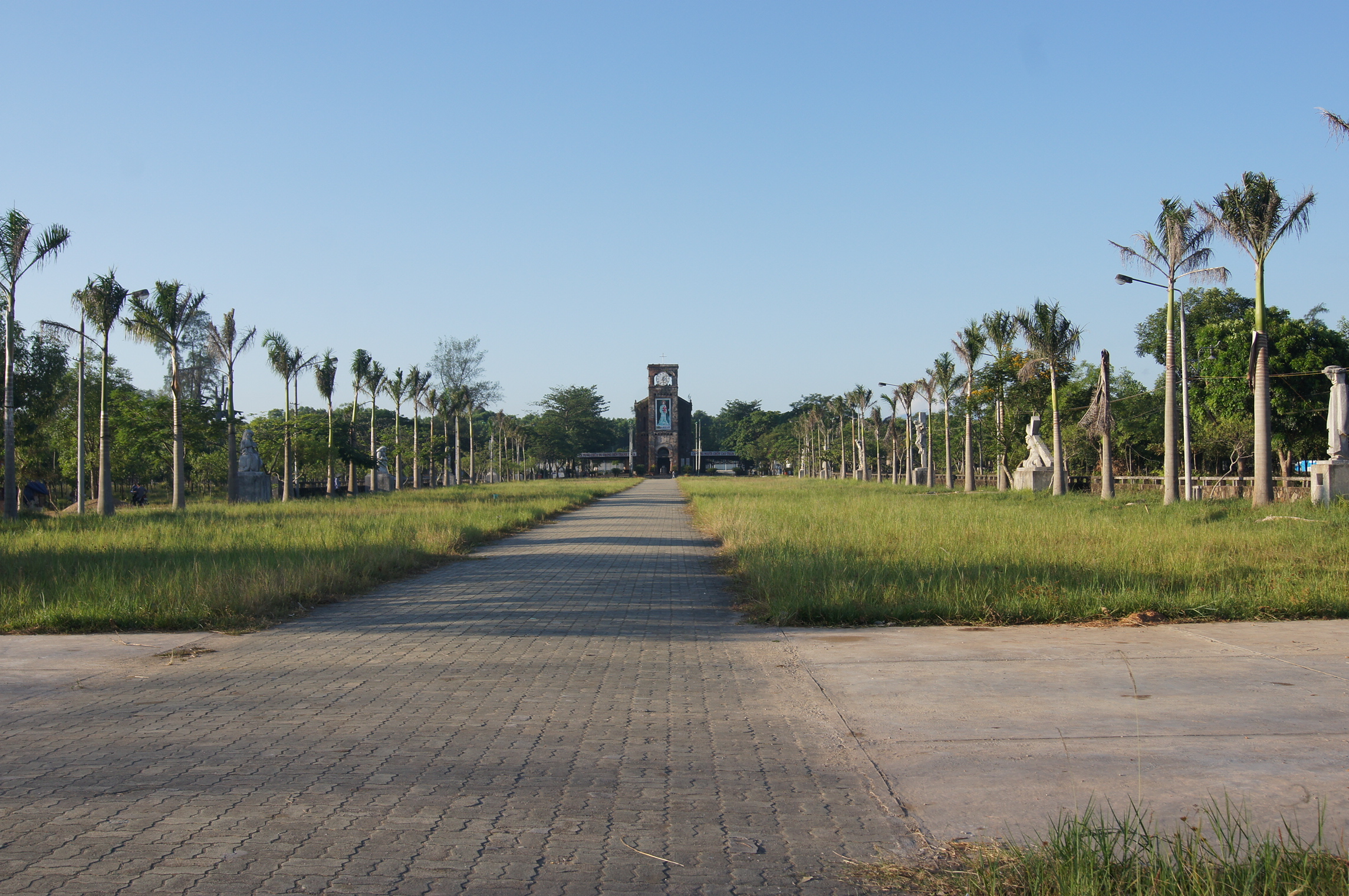
Panorama

== Churches outside Vietnam ==
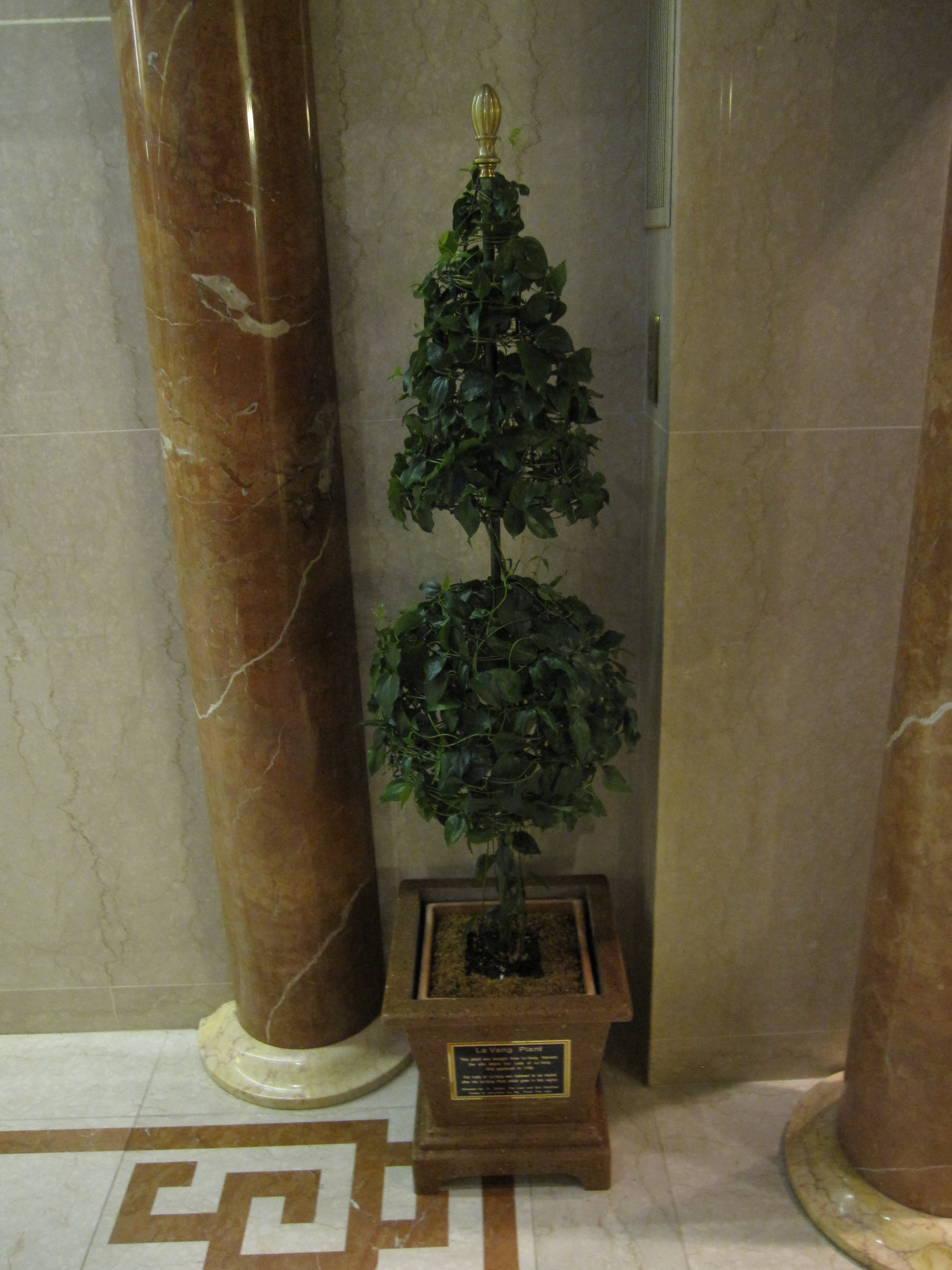
This plant was brought from La Vang, now in Washington DC

=== Australia ===
- Our Lady of La Vang Shrine - Melbourne, Victoria

=== Canada ===
- Our Lady of La Vang Parish - Ottawa, Ontario
- Our Lady of La Vang Vietnamese Community - Mississauga, Ontario

=== Philippines ===
- Our Lady of La Vang Church, Viet-Ville, Puerto Princesa City, Palawan

=== United States ===
==== Alabama ====
- Our Lady of La Vang Catholic Church - Birmingham, Alabama

==== Arizona ====
- Our Lady of La Vang Parish - Tucson, Arizona

==== California ====
- Our Lady of La Vang Shrine (Christ Cathedral) - Garden Grove, California
- Our Lady of La Vang Shrine (St. Bonaventure Catholic Church) - Huntington Beach, California
- Our Lady of La Vang Community (Church of the Visitacion) - San Francisco, California
- Our Lady of La Vang Parish - San Jose, California
- Our Lady of La Vang Church - Santa Ana, California
- Vietnamese Catholic Center Diocese of Orange (Hội La Vang) - Santa Ana, California

==== Connecticut ====
- Our Lady of La Vang Church - Bridgeport, Connecticut

==== Florida ====
- Our Lady of La Vang Vietnamese Parish (Giáo Xứ Đức Mẹ La Vang) - Hallandale Beach, Florida

==== Georgia ====
- Our Lady Of Vietnam Church - Atlanta, Georgia

==== Louisiana ====
- Our Lady of La Vang Shrine - New Orleans, Louisiana

==== Maryland ====
- Our Lady of La Vang Catholic Church - Baltimore, Maryland
- Shrine of Our Lady of La Vang (National Shrine Grotto of Our Lady of Lourdes) - Emmitsburg, Maryland
- Our Lady of Vietnam Catholic Church - Silver Spring, Maryland

==== Michigan ====
- Our Lady of La Vang Church - Wyoming, Michigan

==== New Mexico ====
- Our Lady of La Vang Church - Albuquerque, New Mexico

==== Nevada ====
- Shrine of Our Lady of La Vang - Las Vegas, Nevada (also serves as the Vietnamese Catholic Center in Las Vegas)

==== North Carolina ====
- Our Lady of La Vang Parish - Raleigh, North Carolina

==== Ohio ====
- Our Lady of La Vang Church - Cincinnati, Ohio

==== Oklahoma ====
- Our Lady of La Vang Shrine (Cathedral of Our Lady of Perpetual Help) - Oklahoma City, Oklahoma

==== Oregon ====
- Our Lady of La Vang Parish - Happy Valley, Oregon

==== South Carolina ====
- Our Lady of La Vang Catholic Church - Greer, South Carolina

==== Texas ====
- Our Lady of La Vang Parish - Houston, Texas
- Our Lady of La Vang Parish - Palacios, Texas

==== Virginia ====
- Our Lady of La Vang Church - Norfolk, Virginia

==== Washington, D.C. ====
- Shrine of Our Lady of La Vang (Basilica of the National Shrine of the Immaculate Conception) - Washington, D.C.

=== Gallery ===
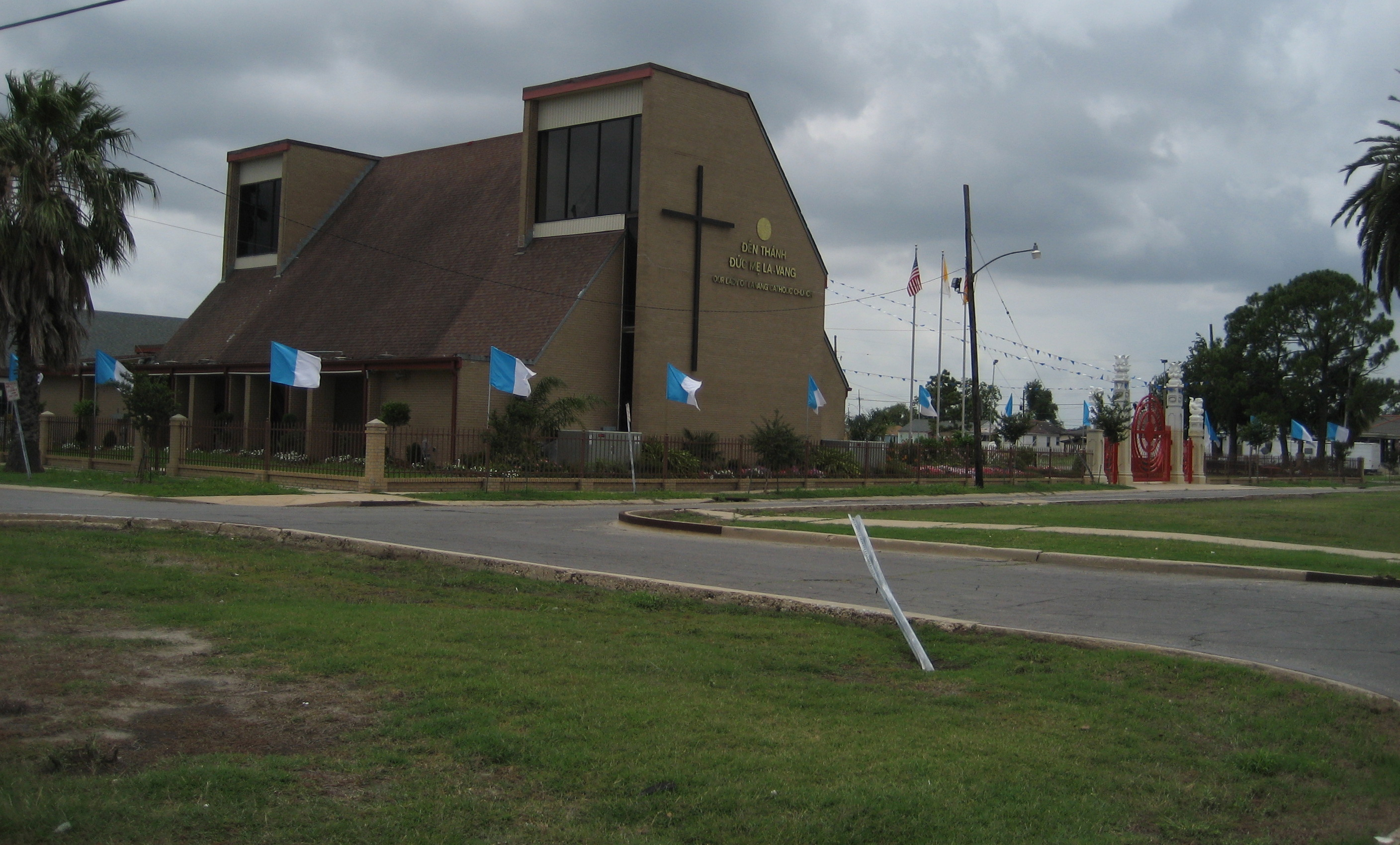
"Our Lady of Lavang" Vietnam Catholic Church in New Orleans

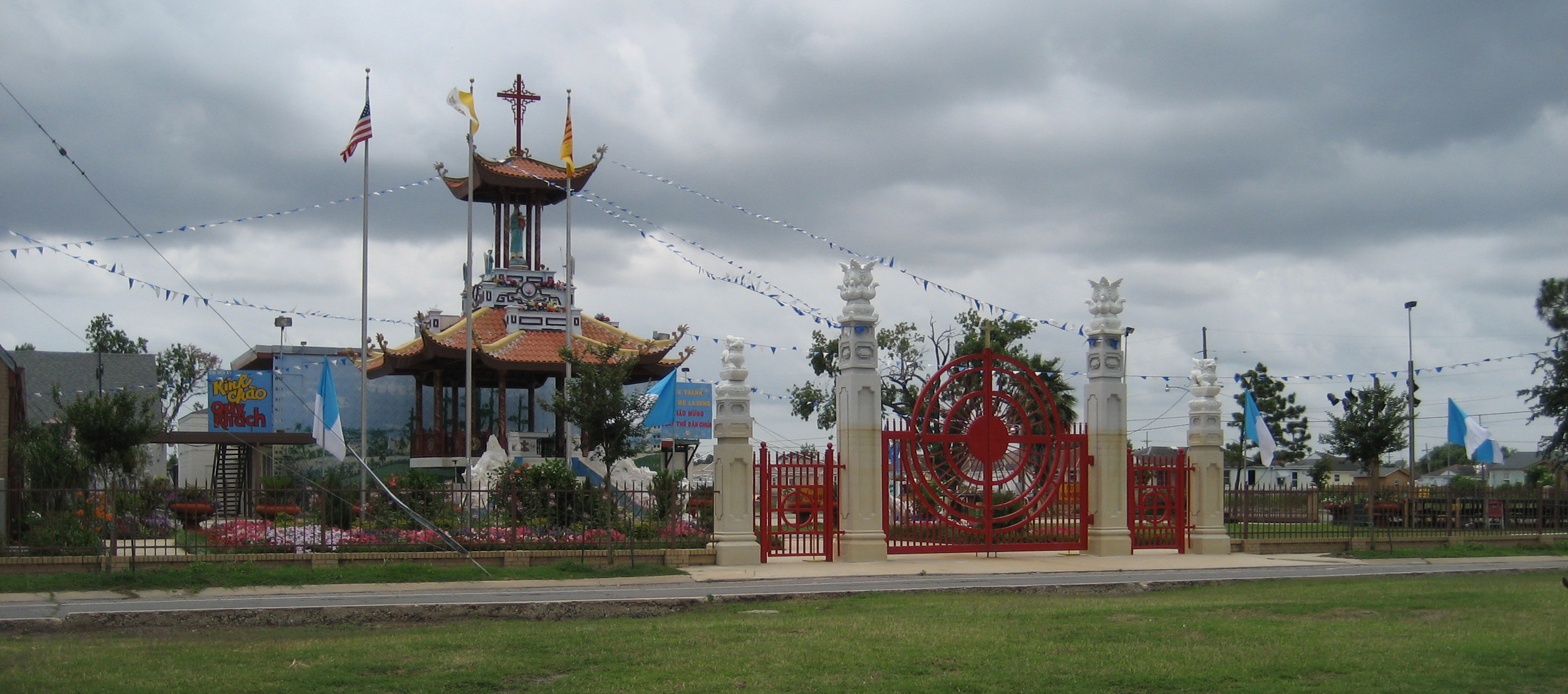
"Our Lady of Lavang" Vietnam Catholic Church in New Orleans

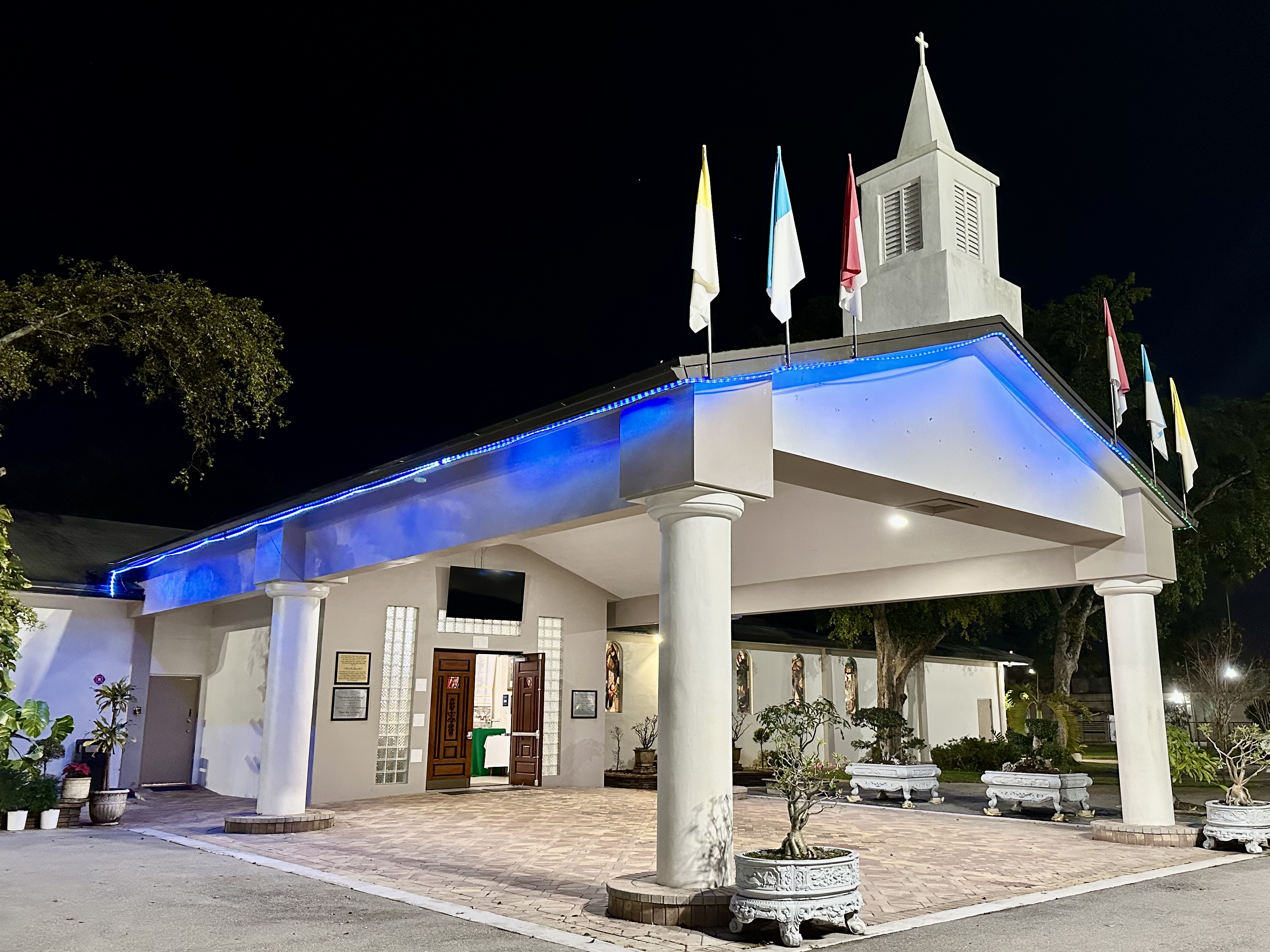
Our Lady of La Vang Vietnamese Parish (Giáo Xứ Đức Mẹ La Vang) in Hallandale Beach, Florida

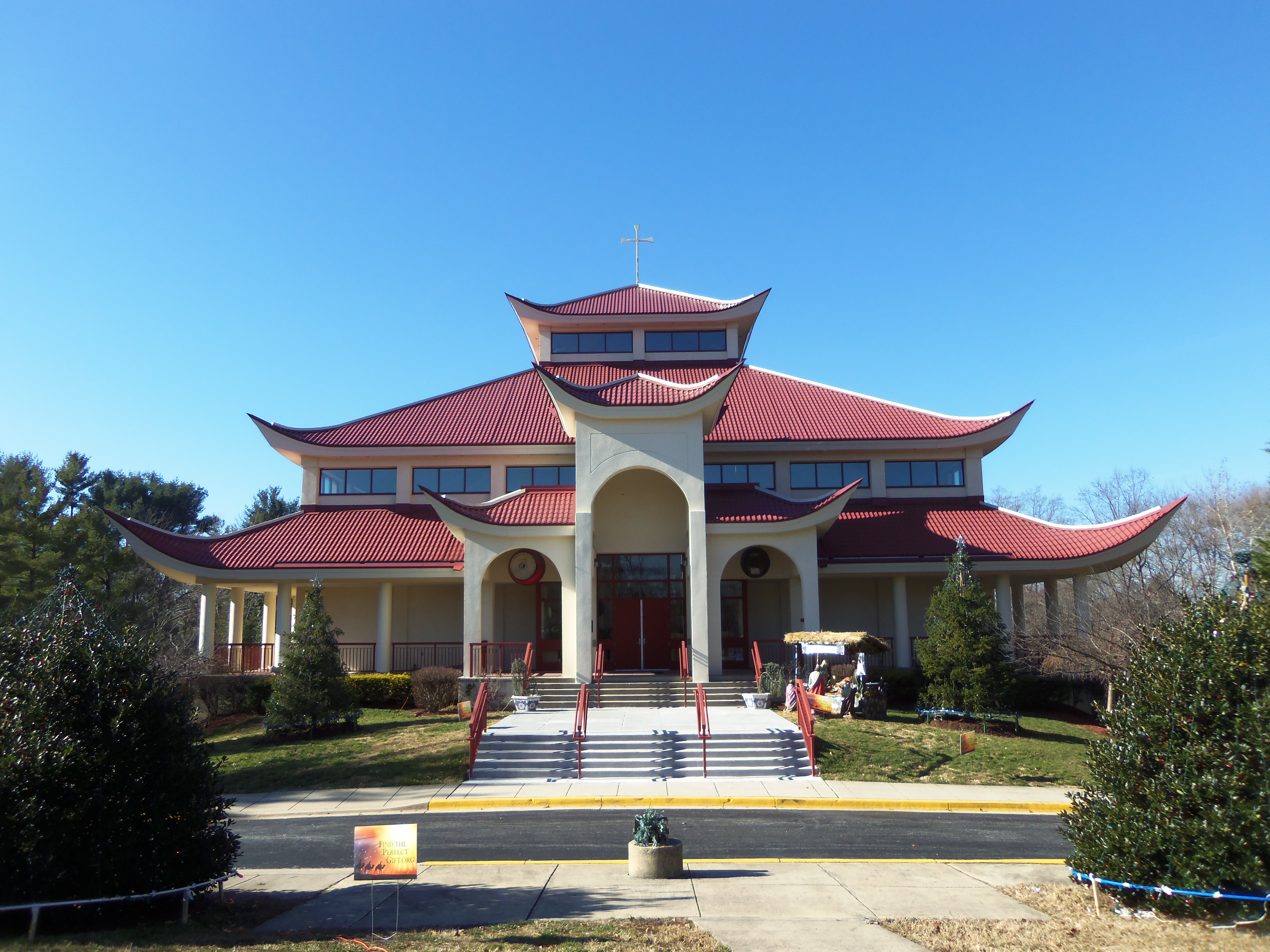
Our Lady of Vietnam Catholic Church in Silver Spring, Maryland.

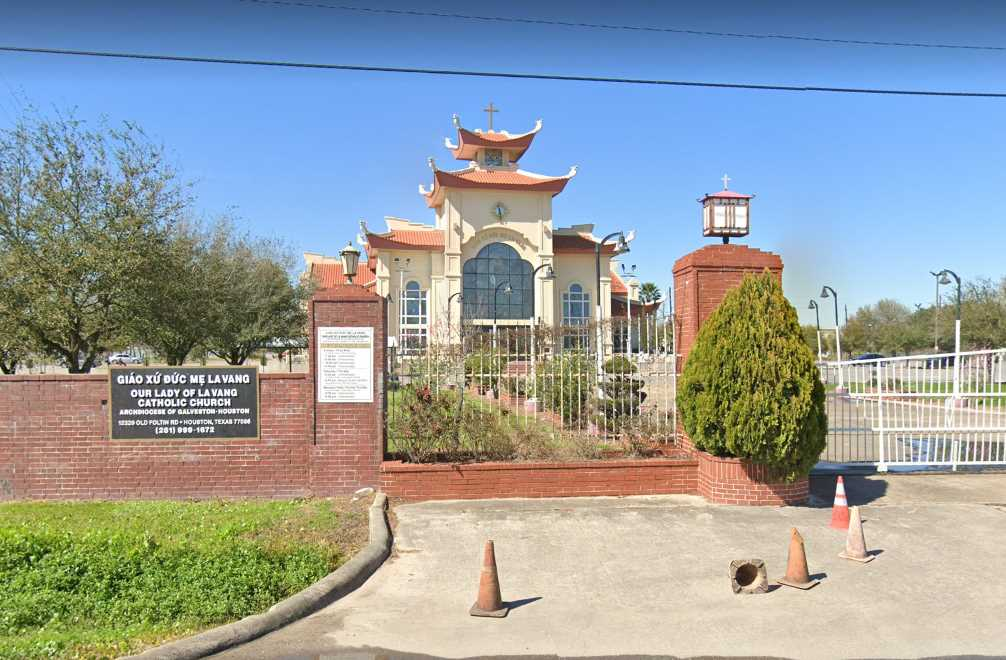
Our Lady of Lavang Catholic Church in Houston, TX.

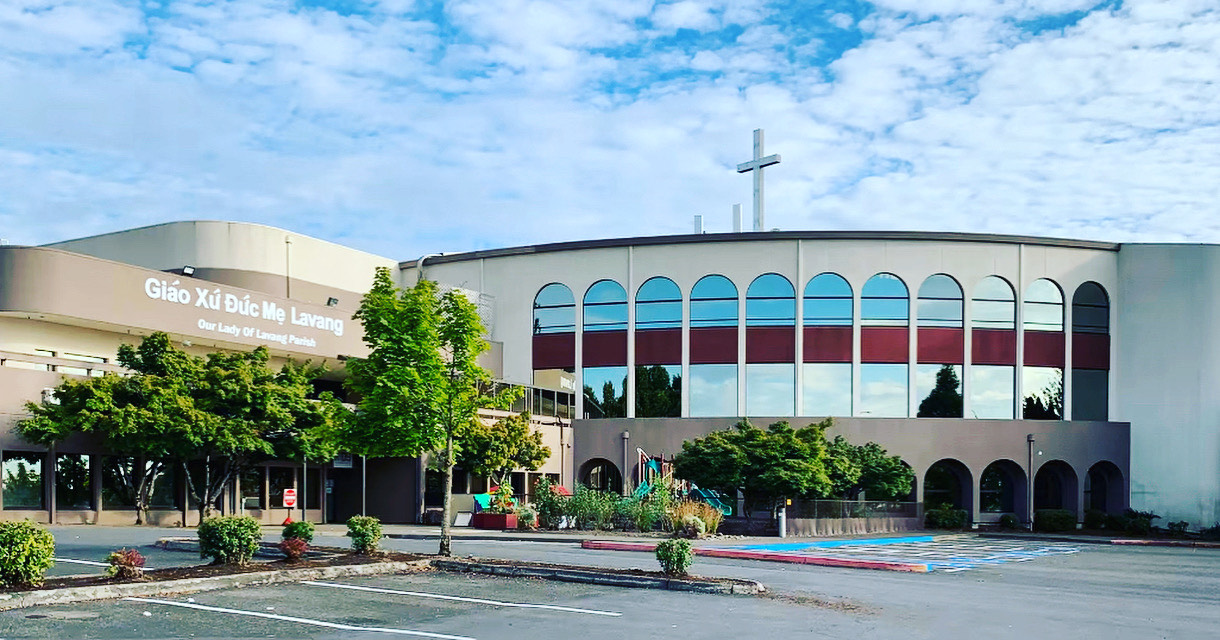
Our Lady of La Vang Happy Valley, Oregon

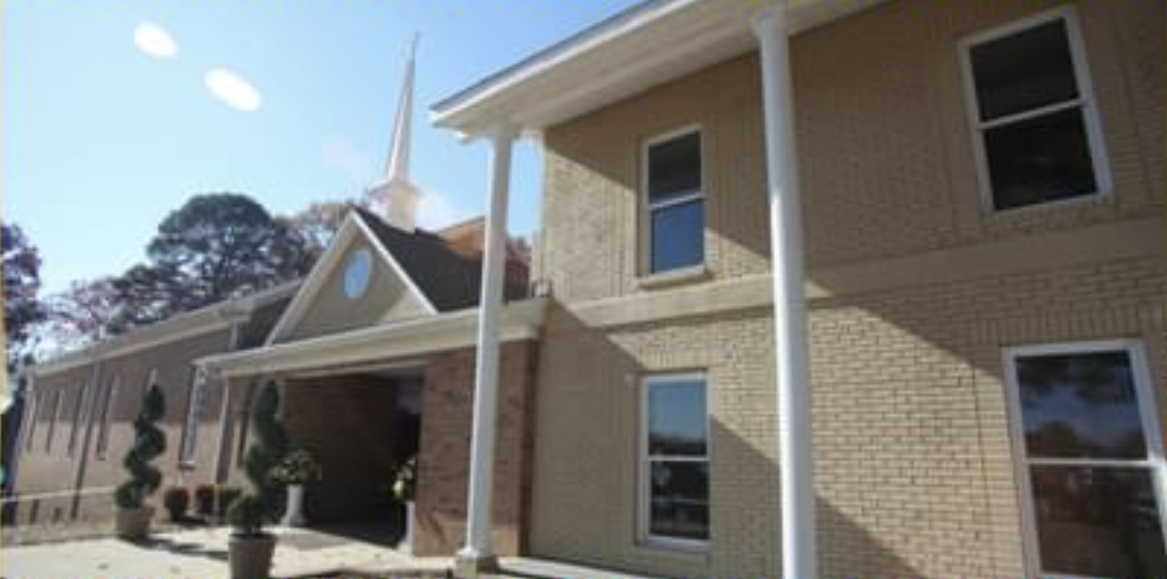
Our Lady of La Vang (Họ Đạo Đức Mẹ La Vang) Catholic Church in Greer, South Carolina

== See also ==
- Marian Days
- Our Lady of Trà Kiệu
