= Lebyazhy Lug =

Lebyazhy Lug Лебяжий Луг
- Village
- Location within Ivanovo Oblast Location within Russia
- Coordinates: 56°55′N 40°58′E
- Country: Russia
- Region: Ivanovo Oblast
- District: Ivanovsky District
- Time zone: UTC+3:00

Lebyazhy Lug (Russian: Лебяжий Луг) is a rural locality (a village) in Ivanovsky District, Ivanovo Oblast, Russia. Population: 356 (2010 census);

== Geography ==
This rural locality is located 7 km from Ivanovo (the district's administrative centre and capital of Ivanovo Oblast) and 242 km from Moscow. Zhukovo is the nearest rural locality.
