= 2004–05 Celtic F.C. season =

Celtic
2004–05 season
- Chairman: Brian Quinn
- Manager: Martin O'Neill
- Ground: Celtic Park; Glasgow, Scotland (Capacity: 60,355)
- Scottish Premier League: 2nd
- Scottish Cup: Winners
- Scottish League Cup: Quarter-finals
- Champions League: Group stage
- Top goalscorer: League: John Hartson (25); All: John Hartson (30)
Home colours	Away colours	Third colours

Celtic started season 2004–05 looking to win the Scottish Premier League trophy and retain the Scottish Cup. They also competed in the Scottish League Cup and entered the Champions League at the group stage.

In the race for the SPL title, Celtic recorded a win over city rivals Rangers. However, as the season drew to a close, with Rangers closely following, the club extended their lead at the top of the SPL table to two points as they lined up for the final game of the season. A win at Motherwell was required to seal the title.

With two minutes remaining on the clock, Celtic were leading 1–0, a result which would have handed them the league. However, Motherwell's Scott McDonald (who later signed for Celtic) netted two last-minute goals. Rangers defeated Hibernian 1–0 at Easter Road, thereby winning the league championship title and leaving Celtic in second position. Celtic ended the season one week later with a 1–0 win over Dundee United in the Scottish Cup Final, which was marked by fans as Martin O'Neill's final match as manager.

On 25 May 2005, O'Neill announced he would resign as manager of Celtic at the end of 2004–05 season along with first team coach Steve Walford and assistant manager John Robertson. It was widely reported that O'Neill decided to take time out of football in order to care for his ailing wife, who was ill with lymphoma.

== Competitions ==
All results (home and away) list Celtic's goal tally first.

Win Draw Loss

Date	Venue	Opponents	Score	Competition	Celtic scorers
18 July 2004	Craven Cottage	(England) Fulham	2–0	Friendly	Hartson, Lennon (pen.)
24 July 2004	Qwest Field	(England) Chelsea	2–4	ChampionsWorld Series	Beattie (2)
27 July 2004	Rentschler Field	(England) Liverpool	1–5	ChampionsWorld Series	Beattie (pen.)
29 July 2004	Lincoln Financial Field	(England) Manchester United	2–1	ChampionsWorld Series	Sutton (pen.), Beattie
1 August 2004	SkyDome	(Italy) Roma	0–1	ChampionsWorld Series	
4 August 2004	Celtic Park	(England) Newcastle United	2–1	Friendly	Sylla, Camara
8 August 2004	Celtic Park	Motherwell	2–0	SPL	McNamara, Sutton
10 August 2004	Celtic Park	(England) Tottenham	2–0	Friendly	Beattie, Camara
14 August 2004	Rugby Park	Kilmarnock	4–2	SPL	Hartson (2), Thompson (2)
22 August 2004	Pittodrie Stadium	Inverness CT	3–1	SPL	Hartson (2), Petrov
29 August 2004	Celtic Park	Rangers	1–0	SPL	Thompson
11 September 2004	Celtic Park	Dundee	3–0	SPL	Camara (2), Hartson
14 September 2004	Celtic Park	(Spain) Barcelona	1–3	UCL	Sutton
19 September 2004	Easter Road	Hibernian	2–2	SPL	Camara, Hartson
21 September 2004	Celtic Park	Falkirk	8–1	SLC	Sylla, Wallace (3), Lambert, McManus, McGeady
25 September 2004	Celtic Park	Dunfermline Athletic	3–0	SPL	Camara (2), Varga
29 September 2004	San Siro	(Italy) Milan	1–3	UCL	Varga
3 October 2004	Tannadice	Dundee United	3–0	SPL	Sutton (2) (pen.), Petrov
16 October 2004	Celtic Park	Hearts	3–0	SPL	Camara, Juninho, Hartson
20 October 2004	Lokomotiv Stadium (Donetsk)	(Ukraine) Shakhtar Donetsk	0–3	UCL	
24 October 2004	Almondvale Stadium	Livingston	4–2	SPL	Petrov, Camara, Hartson, Sutton
27 October 2004	Celtic Park	Aberdeen	2–3	SPL	Hartson (2)
30 October 2004	Fir Park	Motherwell	3–2	SPL	McGeady, Thompson (pen.), Beattie
2 November 2004	Celtic Park	(Ukraine) Shakhtar Donetsk	1–0	UCL	Thompson
6 November 2004	Celtic Park	Kilmarnock	2–1	SPL	McGeady, Thompson (pen.)
10 November 2004	Ibrox Stadium	Rangers	1–2	SLC	Hartson
13 November 2004	Celtic Park	Inverness CT	3–0	SPL	Sutton, Hartson (2)
20 November 2004	Ibrox Stadium	Rangers	0–2	SPL	
24 November 2004	Nou Camp	(Spain) Barcelona	1–1	UCL	Hartson
28 November 2004	Dens Park	Dundee	2–2	SPL	Camara, Hartson
4 December 2004	Celtic Park	Hibernian	2–1	SPL	Hartson (2)
7 December 2004	Celtic Park	(Italy) Milan	0–0	UCL	
12 December 2004	East End Park	Dunfermline Athletic	2–0	SPL	Sutton, Petrov
18 December 2004	Celtic Park	Dundee United	1–0	SPL	Sutton
26 December 2004	Tynecastle	Hearts	2–0	SPL	McGeady, Petrov
2 January 2005	Celtic Park	Livingston	2–1	SPL	Hartson, Sutton
9 January 2005	Celtic Park	Rangers	2–1	SC	Sutton, Hartson
16 January 2005	Pittodrie	Aberdeen	1–0	SPL	Sutton
22 January 2005	Celtic Park	Motherwell	2–0	SPL	Sutton, Petrov
30 January 2005	Rugby Park	Kilmarnock	1–0	SPL	Sutton (pen.)
6 February 2005	East End Park	Dunfermline Athletic	3–0	SC	Hartson (2) Sutton
20 February 2005	Celtic Park	Rangers	0–2	SPL	
27 February 2005	Broadwood Stadium	Clyde	5–0	SC	Varga (2), Thompson (pen.), Petrov, Bellamy
2 March 2005	Celtic Park	Dundee	3–0	SPL	Petrov, Balde (2)
6 March 2005	Easter Road	Hibernian	3–1	SPL	Petrov, Hartson, Bellamy
12 March 2005	Celtic Park	Dunfermline Athletic	6–0	SPL	Hartson (2), McGeady, Petrov (2), Beattie
16 March 2005	Caledonian Stadium	Inverness CT	2–0	SPL	Bellamy, Thompson (pen.)
19 March 2005	Tannadice	Dundee United	3–2	SPL	Bellamy (3)
2 April 2005	Celtic Park	Hearts	0–2	SPL	
10 April 2005	Hampden Park	Hearts	2–1	SC	Sutton, Bellamy
13 April 2005	Almondvale Stadium	Livingston	4–0	SPL	Hartson (3) (pen.), Varga
16 April 2005	Celtic Park	Aberdeen	3–2	SPL	Varga, Hartson, Bellamy
24 April 2005	Ibrox Stadium	Rangers	2–1	SPL	Petrov, Bellamy
30 April 2005	Celtic Park	Hibernian	1–3	SPL	Beattie
8 May 2005	Celtic Park	Aberdeen	2–0	SPL	Hartson (2)
15 May 2005	Tynecastle	Hearts	2–1	SPL	Thompson, Beattie
22 May 2005	Fir Park	Motherwell	1–2	SPL	Sutton
28 May 2005	Hampden Park	Dundee United	1–0	SC	Thompson

Key:

- SPL = Scottish Premier League
- SC = Scottish Cup
- SLC = Scottish League Cup
- CLF - Champions League Group F
- CL = Champions League Match
- F = Friendly match

== Squad ==
Note: Flags indicate national team as defined under FIFA eligibility rules; some limited exceptions apply. Players may hold more than one non-FIFA nationality.

No.	Pos.	Nation	Player
2	DF	SUI	Stéphane Henchoz
3	MF	GUI	Mohammed Sylla
4	DF	SCO	Jackie McNamara
5	DF	BEL	Joos Valgaeren
6	DF	GUI	Bobo Baldé
7	MF	BRA	Juninho
8	MF	ENG	Alan Thompson
9	FW	ENG	Chris Sutton
10	FW	WAL	John Hartson
11	MF	SCO	Stephen Pearson
12	MF	ESP	David Fernández
14	MF	SCO	Paul Lambert
16	DF	DEN	Ulrik Laursen
17	MF	FRA	Didier Agathe
18	MF	NIR	Neil Lennon
19	MF	BUL	Stiliyan Petrov

No.	Pos.	Nation	Player
20	GK	SCO	Rab Douglas
21	GK	SWE	Magnus Hedman
22	GK	SCO	David Marshall
23	DF	SVK	Stanislav Varga
27	FW	SEN	Henri Camara
29	MF	SCO	Shaun Maloney
33	MF	SCO	Ross Wallace
35	MF	SCO	Paul Lawson
37	FW	SCO	Craig Beattie
41	DF	SCO	John Kennedy
44	DF	SCO	Stephen McManus
46	MF	IRL	Aiden McGeady
47	FW	WAL	Craig Bellamy
—	DF	SCO	Craig Reid
48	MF	SCO	James McLeod
—	FW	ISL	Kjartan Finnbogason

== Player statistics ==
=== Appearances and goals ===
List of squad players, including number of appearances by competition

No.	Pos	Nat	Player	Total		Premier League		FA Cup		League Cup		Other	
No.	Pos	Nat	Player	Apps	Goals	Apps	Goals	Apps	Goals	Apps	Goals	Apps	Goals
2	DF	(Switzerland) SUI	Stéphane Henchoz	8	0	2+4	0	2	0	0	0	0	0
3	DF	(Guinea) GUI	Mohammed Sylla	9	1	1+5	0	0	0	1	1	0+2	0
4	DF	(Scotland) SCO	Jackie McNamara	44	1	34	1	4	0	1	0	5	0
5	DF	(Belgium) BEL	Joos Valgaeren	28	0	18+1	0	1+1	0	2	0	4+1	0
6	DF	(Guinea) GUI	Dianbobo Balde	46	3	34	2	5	0	2	1	5	0
7	MF	(Brazil) BRA	Juninho Paulista	22	1	9+5	1	1+1	0	2	0	2+2	0
8	MF	(England) ENG	Alan Thompson	44	10	32	7	5	2	1+1	0	5	1
9	FW	(England) ENG	Chris Sutton	37	16	25+2	12	5	3	0	0	4+1	1
10	FW	(Wales) WAL	John Hartson	49	30	38	25	4	3	1	1	6	1
11	MF	(Scotland) SCO	Stephen Pearson	9	0	1+7	0	0	0	1	0	0	0
12	FW	(Spain) ESP	David Fernández	1	0	0+1	0	0	0	0	0	0	0
14	MF	(Scotland) SCO	Paul Lambert	7	1	0+4	0	0+2	0	1	1	0	0
15	MF	(Netherlands) NED	Bobby Petta	0	0	0	0	0	0	0	0	0	0
16	DF	(Denmark) DEN	Ulrik Laursen	21	0	12+6	0	2	0	1	0	0	0
17	DF	(France) FRA	Didier Agathe	24	0	14+2	0	2	0	1	0	5	0
18	MF	(Northern Ireland) NIR	Neil Lennon	49	0	38	0	4	0	1	0	6	0
19	MF	(Bulgaria) BUL	Stiliyan Petrov	49	12	37	11	5	1	1	0	6	0
20	GK	(Scotland) SCO	Rab Douglas	19	0	14	0	4	0	1	0	0	0
21	GK	(Sweden) SWE	Magnus Hedman	8	0	6	0	0	0	0	0	2	0
22	GK	(Scotland) SCO	David Marshall	24	0	18	0	1	0	1	0	4	0
23	DF	(Slovakia) SVK	Stanislav Varga	46	6	34	3	5	2	1	0	6	1
27	FW	(Senegal) SEN	Henri Camara	26	8	12+6	8	0+1	0	0+1	0	4+2	0
29	FW	(Scotland) SCO	Shaun Maloney	3	0	1+1	0	0+1	0	0	0	0	0
33	MF	(Scotland) SCO	Ross Wallace	21	3	4+12	0	0+1	0	1	3	0+3	0
35	MF	(Scotland) SCO	Paul Lawson	0	0	0	0	0	0	0	0	0	0
37	FW	(Scotland) SCO	Craig Beattie	13	4	0+11	4	0	0	0+1	0	0+1	0
41	DF	(Scotland) SCO	John Kennedy	0	0	0	0	0	0	0	0	0	0
44	DF	(Scotland) SCO	Stephen McManus	4	1	2	0	0	0	1	1	0+1	0
46	MF	(Republic of Ireland) IRL	Aiden McGeady	37	5	20+7	4	2+3	0	1+1	1	2+1	0
47	FW	(Wales) WAL	Craig Bellamy	15	9	12	7	3	2	0	0	0	0

== Team statistics ==
=== League table ===
Pos	Team	Pld	W	D	L	GF	GA	GD	Pts	Qualification or relegation (Note: Teams played each other three times (33 matches), before the league split into two groups (the top six and the bottom six) for the last five matches.)
1	Rangers (C)	38	29	6	3	78	22	+56	93	Qualification for the Champions League third qualifying round
2	Celtic	38	30	2	6	85	35	+50	92	Qualification for the Champions League second qualifying round
3	Hibernian	38	18	7	13	64	57	+7	61	Qualification for the UEFA Cup first round
4	Aberdeen	38	18	7	13	44	39	+5	61	
5	Heart of Midlothian	38	13	11	14	43	41	+2	50	

Source: Scottish Professional Football League
Rules for classification: 1) Points; 2) Goal difference; 3) Goals scored
(C) Champions

== Technical staff ==
Position	Staff
Manager	Martin O'Neill
Assistant Manager	John Robertson
First Team Coach	Steve Walford
Goalkeeping Coach	Terry Gennoe
Head of Youth Academy	Tommy Burns
Head of Recruitment	Tom O'Neill
Head Physiotherapist	Tim Williamson
Physiotherapist	Gavin McCarthy
Doctor	Roddy MacDonald
Head of Sports Science	Kenny McMillan
Performance Coach	Jim Henry

Last updated: 12 June 2017

== Transfers ==
=== In ===
Date	Player	From	Fee
29 June 2004	(Canada) Jacob Lensky	(England) Blackburn Rovers	Free
30 July 2004	(Senegal) Henri Camara	(England) Wolverhampton Wanderers	£1,500,000 (on loan)
25 August 2004	(Brazil) Juninho	(England) Middlesbrough	Free
23 December 2004	(Iceland) Kjartan Finnbogason	(Iceland) KR	Undisclosed
23 December 2004	(Iceland) Teddy Bjarnason	(Iceland) KR	Undisclosed
29 January 2005	(Switzerland) Stéphane Henchoz	(England) Liverpool	Free
1 February 2005	(Wales) Craig Bellamy	(England) Newcastle United	Loan

=== Out ===
Date	Player	To	Fee
30 June 2004	(Sweden) Henrik Larsson	(Spain) Barcelona	Free
1 July 2004	(Republic of Ireland) Liam Miller	(England) Manchester United	Free
2 July 2004	(Sweden) Johan Mjällby	(Spain) Levante	Free
21 July 2004	(Scotland) Jamie Smith	(Netherlands) ADO Den Haag	Free
10 November 2004	(Netherlands) Bobby Petta	Terminated contract	Released
8 January 2005	(Scotland) Kevin McBride	(Scotland) Motherwell	Undisclosed
31 January 2005	(Senegal) Henri Camara	(England) Southampton	End of loan
6 April 2005	(Brazil) Juninho	(Brazil) Palmeiras	Free

- Expenditure: ▼£1,500,000
- Income: ▲£0
- Total loss/gain: ▼£1,500,000

== See also ==
- List of Celtic F.C. seasons

James McLeod was released due to long term injury, ongoing Sciatic nerve problem due to dislocating herniated disc.
