= Ross Wallace =

Scottish footballer

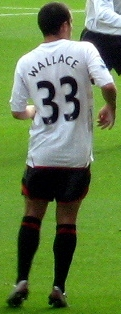
- Wallace playing for Sunderland in 2007

Personal information
- Full name: Ross Wallace
- Date of birth: 23 May 1985 (age 41)
- Place of birth: Dundee, Scotland
- Height: 5 ft 6 in (1.68 m)
- Position: Winger

Youth career
- –2002: Celtic

Senior career*
Years	Team	Apps	(Gls)
2002–2006	Celtic	37	(1)
2006–2009	Sunderland	53	(8)
2008–2009	→ Preston North End (loan)	23	(3)
2009–2010	Preston North End	57	(9)
2010–2015	Burnley	149	(12)
2015–2018	Sheffield Wednesday	108	(10)
2018–2019	Fleetwood Town	39	(1)
2020	St Mirren	3	(0)
Total		469	(44)

International career
2002	Scotland U18	2	(0)
2003–2004	Scotland U19	7	(3)
2004–2006	Scotland U21	4	(0)
2007	Scotland B	1	(0)
2009	Scotland	2	(0)

Managerial career
- 2026: Burnley F.C. Women (interim)
- * Club domestic league appearances and goals

Ross Wallace (born 23 May 1985) is a Scottish former professional footballer who played as a winger. He played for Celtic, Sunderland, Preston North End, Burnley, Sheffield Wednesday, Fleetwood Town, and once played in a full international match for Scotland. After retiring from professional football, Wallace re–joined Burnley as an assistant coach of the youth team and following a stint as first-team coach at Fleetwood Town, he became the interim head coach of Burnley F.C. Women.

== Club career ==
=== Celtic ===
Born in Dundee, Wallace started his career with Celtic and progressed through the club's youth system. He made his Celtic debut, coming on as a 68th-minute substitute, in a 4–2 win against Inverness Caledonian Thistle in the third round of the Scottish League Cup on 27 October 2002. With one appearance made in the 2002–03 season, Wallace signed his first professional contract with the club on 23 June 2003 on a four-year deal.

A pacy left winger, Wallace made his UEFA Champions League debut against FBK Kaunas in the second leg of the UEFA Champions League second round, coming on as an 80th-minute substitute, in a 1–0 win to advance to the next round. It was not until on 1 November 2003 when he made his first league appearance for Celtic, coming on as an 81st-minute substitute, in a 5–0 win against Kilmarnock. This was followed up by scoring his first goal for the club, in a 5–0 win over Dunfermline Athletic on 8 November 2003. Whilst clearly a skillful player, Wallace made only a few more first team appearances that season, as Alan Thompson remained the first-choice wide-left player at Celtic, but his contributions to the club saw them win the league after winning 1–0 against Kilmarnock on 18 April 2004. Following a 1–1 draw against Motherwell on 12 May 2004, he was attacked by a pitch-invasion Motherwell supporter, prompting a police investigation. Wallace picked up his first silverware with the club, coming on as a second-half substitute for Stephen Pearson in Celtic's 3–1 win over Dunfermline in the Scottish Cup. At the end of the 2003–04 season, he went on to make fourteen appearances and scoring once in all competitions.

In the 2004–05 season, Wallace began to receive more playing time for Celtic, playing in the midfield position, rotating in and out of the starting line–up. After being sidelined with a hamstring injury, he scored a hat-trick on his return, in an 8–1 rout of Falkirk in a Scottish League Cup tie on 21 September 2004. After the match, manager Martin O'Neill praised his performance. Alan Thompson also said that Wallace was likely to succeed him in the future at left midfield positioned. However, he made little impact in either his league or European appearances, leading to a loan enquiry from Inverness CT, whose bid was rejected. Manager O'Neill dismissed any interest in Wallace from other clubs, saying the player remained part of his plans. After the transfer window closed, he continued to have his playing time, coming on from the substitute bench for the rest of the 2004–05 season. With the club finishing second place in the league and only winning the Scottish Cup, Wallace went on to make twenty–one appearances, scoring three times in all competitions.

With the arrival of new manager Gordon Strachan at the start of the 2005–06 season, Wallace made his first appearance of the season, starting a match against Artmedia Bratislava in the second leg of the UEFA Champions League second qualifying round. He set up the second goal of the game for John Hartson, before being substituted in the 54th minute, in a 4–0 win that was not enough for Celtic to overcome a 5–0 deficit from the away leg. However, despite announcing his intention to fight for his first team place, he found himself on the sidelines for the first few months, coming on from the substitute bench. On 3 December 2005, Strachan began to play Wallace at left-back position in place of Mo Camara. He started his first match in this position, playing the full 90 minutes, in a 3–1 win against Aberdeen. However, this turned out to be a strange selection given Wallace's slight build and inexperience of playing in a defensive role. Strachan persisted with this team selection for several weeks to the bemusement of fans who could clearly see the player's lack of aptitude for playing in defence. This further highlighted his lack of positional awareness in playing in defence when he scored an own goal in the New Year's Day game against Hearts at Tynecastle, although the club still won 3–2 on 1 January 2006. Towards the end of the season, new signing Mark Wilson replaced him at left back even though it was not his natural position (Wilson is a right back). But Wallace played in the Scottish League Cup Final at a left back position against Dunfermline Athletic, due to Wilson being cup-tied and Celtic won 3–0. He later made two appearances later in the 2005–06 season and despite being dropped from the first team, his contributions saw the club win the league. By the end of the 2005–06 season, Wallace went on to make fourteen appearances in all competitions.

Ahead of the 2006–07 season, Wallace went on trial at Championship side Birmingham City. It came after a poor display during Celtic's pre–season tour. Wallace made two more appearances for Celtic, starting the first two matches at the beginning of the 2006–07 season. However, he was clearly no longer part of the plans of the Celtic management and was expected to leave the club.

=== Sunderland ===
Wallace was sold to Sunderland on 31 August 2006 in a deal including teammate Stanislav Varga for a combined fee of up to £1,100,000. Upon joining the club, he said about his former teammate turned manager Roy Keane: "I've been on the wrong end of a Roy Keane rollicking once or twice and I still decided to come here. But to be fair, if he does say something, it's going to be good for you. He wants to help you. When he does do it, it's positive criticism. He demands the best because he was world class for a decade. Obviously, he demands the best from everyone here to take the club back up."

Wallace made his Sunderland debut against Derby County on 9 September 2006 and scored the winner in a 2–1 win. This was followed up by setting up a goal for Liam Miller, who scored 14 yards past the goalkeeper, in a 3–0 win against Leeds United four days later on 13 September 2006. However in a match against Ipswich Town on 23 September 2006, he played a role that led Jason de Vos to score an own goal, but was sent–off in the 86th minute for a second bookable offence, in a 3–1 loss. After serving a one match suspension, Wallace returned to the first team, coming on as a 52nd-minute substitute, in a 4–1 loss against Preston North End on 14 October 2006. In a match against Hull City on 28 October 2006, he scored his second goal for the club, which turned out to be the winning goal, but was sent–off for a second bookable offence for taking off his shirt while celebrating. After serving a two match suspension, Wallace scored on his return, scoring the breakthrough goal in the 62nd minute, in a 1–1 draw against Southampton on 11 November 2006. Following this, he was involved in the first team, and the left-wing position had been highly contested between him and teammate Tobias Hysén. Due to injuries, his early form did tail towards the back end of the season. But Wallace was able to re-find his form as the season ended, rotating in playing either the left–back position and left–wing position and scored three more goals. Sunderland fans were more than pleased with the promising form the player showed throughout the 2006–07 campaign as the club won the Championship. At the end of the 2006–07 season, he went on to make thirty–three appearances, scoring six times in all competitions. Following this, Wallace was in talks with Sunderland over an improved contract.

Wallace started the 2007–08 season as Sunderland's first choice left-back despite several new defenders joining the club during pre-season. In the first game of the season against Tottenham Hotspur on 11 August 2007, he lined up on Sunderland's starting eleven to make his Premier League debut and successfully provided the 93rd minute assist that enabled Michael Chopra to score as the club went on to win the game 1–0. In a follow–up match into the second game away to Birmingham City, Wallace played an integral part in the decisive goal when he provided the free kick that eventually led to Stern John's late equaliser, resulting in a 2–2 draw. Wallace then scored his first Premier League goal, in a 2–1 win against Reading at the Stadium of Light on 15 September 2007. Three weeks later on 7 October 2007, he scored his second goal of the season, in a 3–2 loss against Arsenal, which was the first ever goal for Sunderland at their first ever game at the Emirates Stadium. Despite his involvement in the first team so far, manager Keane stated he would consider offers for Wallace, along with five other players, and was placed on a transfer list. However, it was reported on 18 January 2008 that Wallace had sustained an Anterior Cruciate Ligament knee injury and would therefore miss the rest of the 2007–08 football season. While on the sidelines, he was linked with MLS side Toronto, who wanted to sign him but talks never materialised. Shortly after, Wallace made a recovery from his injury in early–March and spent two months making progress on his recovery and featuring in the club's reserve matches. It was not until 11 May 2008 when he made his return on the final game of the season, starting the whole game, in a 1–0 loss against Arsenal. By the end of the 2007–08 season, Wallace had gone on to make twenty–two appearances and scored once in all competitions.

=== Preston North End ===
Over the summer transfer, Wallace remained on the transfer list, leading to interest from Preston North End and Sheffield United. In the 2008 summer transfer window, it was reported that he rejected a move to Preston North End to stay at Sunderland to fight for his place in the first team. Following this, Wallace was taken off the transfer list and he later thanked manager Keane for giving him a second chance to play for the club ahead of the 2008–09 season. However on 31 July 2008, Wallace eventually signed a year-long loan at Preston with a view to a permanent deal at the end of the season.

He made his debut for the club against Chesterfield in the first round of the League Cup, starting the whole game, and setting up a goal for Neil Mellor, in a 2–0 win to advance to the next round. A week later on 23 August 2008, Wallace made his league debut, coming on as a 55th-minute substitute for Barry Nicholson, in a 1–1 draw against Sheffield Wednesday. Having started on the substitute bench, he eventually regained his first team place, playing in the midfield position. Wallace then scored his first goal for Preston North End, in a 2–0 win over Watford on 28 October 2008. He later scored two more goals by the end of the year, coming against Bristol City and Barnsley, respectively. Wallace signed a permanent four-and-a-half-year contract with the club on 12 January 2009. A month later on 21 February 2009, he scored his first goal since joining Preston North End on a permanent basis, in a 3–1 loss against Southampton. Wallace soon became a fan favourite, due to the number of times he provided excellent crosses, mainly for Jon Parkin and went on to provide nineteen assists. By the end of the 2008–09 season, Wallace had gone on to make thirty–nine appearances and scored five times in all competitions.

At the start of the 2009–10 season, Wallace continued to establish himself in the first team, where he began to play in a playmaker role. Wallace scored his first goal of the season, in a 1–1 draw against Ipswich Town on 29 August 2009. He later scored three more goals by the end of the year. Wallace then scored his fifth goal of the season, in a 4–2 loss against Bristol City on 16 January 2010. He later scored two more goals later in the 2009–10 season, coming against Nottingham Forest and Reading. Unlike last season, Wallace was not able to provide more assists, registering only seven. However, he received thirteen bookings, missing two games as a result. By the end of the 2009–10 season, Wallace went on to make forty–five appearances and scored seven times in all competitions.

Upon leaving the club, Wallace said he was disappointed about not getting the chance to say goodbye to his Preston teammates. However, Wallace was criticised in an interview with The Lancashire Telegraph when he expressed his lack of sympathy on Preston North End's struggles that eventually saw them relegated the following season. While playing for Sheffield Wednesday against his former club, Preston North End on 20 February 2016, Wallace was booed by the club's supporters whenever he touched the ball throughout the match, as Wednesday lost 1–0.

=== Burnley ===
Wallace transferred to fellow Championship club Burnley for an undisclosed fee on 2 July 2010, signing a three-year contract. Upon completion of the transfer, he was described by manager Brian Laws as "one of the best left-sided players in the Championship". The club decided to sign him after they ended their interest in signing Hearts' midfielder Andrew Driver.

Wallace scored his first goal in a Burnley shirt a week later on his debut in a pre-season friendly against Bury. He continued to produce a good display throughout the club's pre–season tour in a number of matches. Wallace made his league debut for Burnley, playing the whole game, in a 1–0 win over Nottingham Forest in the opening game of the season. Two weeks later on 21 August 2010, he scored his first goal for the club and also set up a goal for Chris Iwelumo in a 3–0 win over Leicester City. Facing his former club, Preston North End on 11 September 2010, Wallace played a key role in the match when he set up the opener for Iwelumo and a winning goal for Jay Rodriguez in a 4–3 win. After missing a match, due to a groin injury, Wallace found himself on the substitute bench, due to competition in the midfield position. Despite this, he was able to score his second goal for Burnley, in a 3–2 win against Watford on 13 November 2010. On 3 January 2011, Wallace scored his third goal for the club, in a 2–1 loss against Reading. By January, he found himself in and out of the starting line–up for the rest of the 2010–11 season. At the end of the 2010–11 season, Wallace went on to make forty–three appearances and scoring three times in all competitions.

In the opening game of the 2011–12 season, Wallace helped Burnley draw 2–2 with Watford by setting up a goal for Keith Treacy. This was followed up by scoring his first goal of the season and setting up a goal for Jay Rodriguez, who went on to score four goals, in a 6–3 win against Burton Albion in the first round of the League Cup. During the 2011–12 season, Wallace became a first team regular for the club, playing in the left–wing position. Wallace then began rotating into playing different positions, starting out in the right–midfield position and left–back position. He then scored his second goal of the season, scoring from 20 yards, in a 5–1 win against Nottingham Forest on 27 September 2011. This was followed up by setting up a goal for Rodriguez to score the only goal of the game, in a 1–0 win against Millwall. From 22 October 2011 to 5 November 2011, Wallace scored four goals in four consecutive games for Burnley. Wallace also started in every match until he missed a match against Leeds United on 19 November 2011, due to picking up an injury in training. Wallace then returned to the starting line–up against Birmingham City three days later on 22 November 2011, playing the whole game, in a 2–1 loss. However, his return was short–lived when he missed one match for picking up five yellow cards this season. After serving a one match suspension, Wallace returned to the first team against West Ham United on 3 December 2011, coming on as a 58th-minute substitute, and set up the winning goal for Sam Vokes, in a 2–1 win. Following this, he became the club's most consistent performer for the rest of the 2011–12 season, providing nine assists. At the end of the 2011–12 season, Wallace had gone on to make forty–four appearances, scoring six times in all competitions.

At the start of the 2012–13 season, Wallace continued to remain in the first team by rotating in playing either right midfield position. This lasted until 20 October 2012 prior to a match against Bristol City when he suffered a hamstring injury and missed two matches as a result. After missing two matches, Wallace returned to the starting line–up against Wolverhampton Wanderers on 3 November 2012 and set up the second goal of the game, in a 2–0 win. After serving a one match suspension, he returned to the starting line–up and set up two goals in the next two matches against Hull City and Barnsley. On 22 December 2012, Wallace scored his first goal of the season, scoring from a free kick, in a 2–2 draw against Birmingham City; up until now, he struggled to score goals since the start of the 2012–13 season. His second goal of the season came on 1 January 2013 against Sheffield Wednesday, scoring from a penalty and setting up a goal for Keith Treacy, in a 2–0 win. Three weeks later on 26 January 2013, Wallace scored his third goal of the season, in a 2–1 win against Birmingham City. After months of speculation over his future at Burnley, he signed a two-year extension, keeping him until 2015 and in do so, took a pay cut. However, Wallace suffered a hamstring injury that kept him out for weeks. It was not until 11 March 2013 when he made his return to the starting line–up, and played 84 minutes before being substituted, in a 1–0 loss against Hull City. Following this, Wallace started in the next seven matches, playing in the right midfield position before being dropped to the substitute bench for the rest of the 2012–13 season. At the end of the 2012–13 season, he went on to make forty appearances and scoring three times in all competitions.

Wallace started in the first three league matches of the 2013–14 season, playing in the right–midfield position. However, he suffered a knee injury that kept him out for five months after having a surgery. By January, Wallace made a recovery from a knee injury and was featured in a friendly match for the club's reserve match against Wolverhampton Wanderers' reserve. After appearing as an unused substitute against Queens Park Rangers on 1 February 2014, he made his return to the first team, coming on as a late substitute, in a 3–1 win against Millwall seven days later. Following this, Wallace found himself in and out of the starting line–up for the rest of the 2013–14 season, due to competitions in the midfield position. His return to the first team saw Burnley promoted to the Premier League after beating Wigan Athletic 2–0 on 21 April 2014. At the end of the 2013–14 season, he went on to make fifteen appearances in all competitions.

However at the start of the 2014–15 season, Wallace found his playing time, coming from the substitute bench. He made his first appearance of the season, starting the whole game, in a 1–0 loss against Sheffield Wednesday in the second round of the League Cup on 26 August 2014. Wallace scored his first Premier League goal in seven years, in a 2–2 draw against Leicester City on 4 October 2014. He then scored his second goal of the season, in a 4–2 loss against Tottenham Hotspur in the third round FA Cup replay on 14 January 2015. However, Wallace was sidelined on two occasions towards the end of the 2014–15 season. Following this, Wallace was released by Burnley after five seasons with the club, making a total of 165 appearances in all competitions, scoring 14 times.

=== Sheffield Wednesday ===
On 10 July 2015, Wallace joined Championship team Sheffield Wednesday on a one-year deal following his release from Burnley. Upon joining the club, he was given a number thirty–three shirt.

Wallace made his debut for Sheffield Wednesday in the opening game of the season against Bristol City and set up a goal for Lewis McGugan, in a 2–0 win. In a follow–up match, he scored his first goal for the club in a 2–1 defeat at Ipswich Town. Since joining Sheffield Wednesday, Wallace quickly established himself in the first team, playing in the either the left–midfield position and right–midfield position. In a match against Fulham on 19 September 2015, he provided a hat–trick assists, in a 3–2 win. Wallace quickly made an impact since joining the club and was awarded PFA Fans' Players of the Month for August and September. A month later on 27 October 2015, he scored his second goal for Sheffield Wednesday and then set up a goal for Lucas João, in a 3–0 win against Arsenal in the fourth round of the League Cup. Wallace then scored his third goal for the club came in a 1–0 win over Fulham on 2 January 2016 in the Championship; a 25-yard dipping shot after cutting in from the right wing. His next goal for Sheffield Wednesday came on 5 April 2016 against Blackburn Rovers and scoring a winning goal, in a 2–1 win. However in a match against Milton Keynes Dons on 19 April 2016, he received a straight red card after an off the ball incident with Jonny Williams, in a 0–0 draw. After serving a three match suspension, Wallace returned to the starting line–up against Brighton & Hove Albion in the first leg of the Championshup play–offs and scored in a 2–0 win. In the return leg, he scored the equalising goal to help the club reach the final. In the Football League Championship play-off final against Hull City, Wallace started and played 64 minutes before being substituted, as Sheffield Wednesday lost 1–0. Despite missing two matches during the 2015–16 season, Wallace went on to make forty–eight appearances and scoring six times in all competitions. Having expressed interest on staying with the club and beyond, he signed a new contract with Sheffield Wednesday, keeping him until 2018.

At the start of the 2016–17 season, Wallace continued to establish himself in the first team, playing in the right midfield position. By November, he began to find his playing time, coming from the substitute bench, with manager Carlos Carvalhal commentating on Wallace: "He is a player who wasn't playing in the first XI in the last games but if you saw it all the time when he was on the pitch he was the player who had the most effect on the game so far. He didn't play but when he goes inside the pitch, he tried to change things, he tried to give a new dynamic he did well and trued a lot to do this." But Wallace soon regained his first team place in the starting line–up. After suffering an eight months goal drought, he ended this drought by scoring from a 25-yard piledriver in a 2–0 win against Huddersfield Town on 14 January 2017. Two weeks later on 31 January 2017, Wallace scored his second goal of the season, in a 2–2 draw against Bristol City. This was followed by scoring his third goal of the season, in a 1–0 win against Wigan Athletic. Following this, manager Carvalhal praised his performance on regaining his form. As a result, he was awarded the club's Player of the Month for January and March. Wallace set up two goals in the next two matches against Birmingham City and Blackburn Rovers. He added two more goals, coming against Norwich City and Burton Albion between 4 March 2017 and 7 March 2017. After missing two matches due to a knee injury, Wallace returned to the starting line–up and set up two goals in two matches between 4 April 2017 and 8 April 2017 against Rotherham United and Newcastle United. Having determined to help Sheffield Wednesday to reach the Premier League, he helped the club qualify for the Championship play–offs after helping Sheffield Wednesday beat Ipswich Town on 29 April 2017. In the second leg of the Championship play–offs semi–final against Huddersfield Town, however, he suffered an injury and was substituted in the 5th minute, as the club went on to lose 4–3 on penalties following a 1–1 draw. Despite missing a total of five matches throughout the 2016–17 season, Wallace went on to make forty–five appearances and scoring five times in all competitions.

At the start of the 2017–18 season, Wallace found himself in and out of the starting line–up, playing in different positions. He made his 100th appearance for Sheffield Wednesday, in a 3–1 win against Nottingham Forest on 9 September 2017. Wallace scored his first goal of the season, which turns out to be the winning goal, in a 2–1 win against Brentford on 12 September 2017. He then scored his second goal of the season, in a 2–1 loss against Middlesbrough on 23 December 2017. However, during a 2–1 loss against Millwall on 20 February 2018, playing in the false nine position, Wallace suffered a knee injury and was substituted in the 79th minute. After the match, it was announced that he would be sidelined for the rest of the 2017–18 season. At the end of the 2017–18 season, Wallace went on to make thirty–one appearances and scoring two times in all competitions. With one game to play in the 2017–18 season, it was announced that his contract would not be renewed and he would be leaving at the end of the season.

In March 2020, Wallace drew criticism when he commented positively about the departure of manager Carvalhal. Manager Carvalhal responded to Wallace's claims by tweeting on his Twitter account: "Ross did a very good contribution in the first 2 seasons and I must respect this...."

=== Fleetwood Town ===
Following his release by Sheffield Wednesday, Wallace went on trial at Wigan Athletic and was featured in a friendly match against Tranmere Rovers on 14 July 2018, but failed to win a contract despite impressing the club. He then went on trial at EFL League One club Fleetwood Town. On 21 September 2018, following a successful trial period, Wallace joined the club.

The following day, he made his debut for Fleetwood Town, coming on as a 59th-minute substitute, in a 1–0 loss against Southend United. Since joining the club, Wallace quickly established himself in the first team, playing in the centre midfield position. At times, he rotated in playing in different positions in the defence and midfield. On 18 October 2018, Wallace signed a contract with Fleetwood Town for the rest of the 2018–19 season. He then scored his first goal for the club and set up the opening game of the game, in a 3–2 win against Blackpool on 27 October 2018. Since joining Fleetwood Town, Wallace appeared in every match until he missed two matches, due to suspension. After serving a two match suspension, Wallace returned to the starting line–up against Walsall on 9 March 2019 and played 72 minutes before being substituted, in a 2–0 loss. Following his return from suspension, he continued to regain his first team place, playing in different midfield positions for the rest of the 2018–19 season. At the end of the 2018–19 season, Wallace went on to make thirty–eight appearances and scoring once in all competitions. Following this, he was offered a new contract by the club.

On 10 August 2019, Wallace agreed to sign a contract with the club. However, he appeared four matches for Fleetwood Town, coming from the substitute bench. Having made four appearances in all competitions, the club announced the departure of Wallace despite recently signed a contract.

=== St Mirren ===
After five months without a club, Wallace signed a short-term contract with Scottish Premiership club St Mirren on 11 February 2020, making his return to his home country for the first time in fourteen years. Upon joining the club, he said he is aiming to help St Mirren avoid relegation.

Wallace finally made his debut for the club, coming on as a 75th-minute substitute, in a 2–1 win against Motherwell on 25 February 2020. He made his first start for St Mirren, starting a match and playing 84 minutes before being substituted, in a 0–0 draw against St Johnstone on 4 March 2020. Seven days later on 11 March 2020, Wallace set up a goal for Jonathan Obika to the score the only goal of the game, in a 1–0 win against Hearts, which turned out to the last game of the season and saw the opposition team relegated when the season was curtailed with the club finishing ninth place in the league because of the COVID-19 pandemic. At the end of the 2019–20 season, he went on to make three appearances in all competitions. Following this, it was announced on 2 May 2020 when Wallace was among thirteen players top leaving Saints when his contract expired.

== International career ==
Between 2002 and 2006, Wallace represented Scotland, playing from U18 and Scotland U21.

In November 2007, Wallace was called up to the Scotland B team squad for the first time. He made his B team debut, starting the whole game, in a 1–1 draw against Republic of Ireland B team on 20 November 2007. Throughout his football career, Wallace made statements that moving to new clubs and performances would benefited his hopes of getting a call–up from the Scotland national team.

There were public calls from teammates and managers to convince the national team to call him to the squad, but was overlooked instead. With the exception in October when he was called up to the national team squad. Wallace made one full international appearance for Scotland, in a friendly match with Japan on 10 October 2009.

== Post-playing career ==
Following his release by St. Mirren, Wallace retired from professional football. He previously announced his intention to move to coaching once his playing days is over. In March 2021, Wallace re–joined Burnley as club's youth development.

In December 2023, he returned to Fleetwood Town as first-team coach.

In February 2026, he became the interim manager of Burnley FC Women.

== Personal life ==
Early in his football career, Wallace developed a reputation for taking off his shirt after scoring a goal. After his sending off against Hull City on 28 October 2006, Wallace said he would stop taking off his shirt and learn from his mistake. In response, manager Keane said he had no sympathy for Wallace, but decided not to "crucify him" and hope the player learned his lesson. After scoring his first goal in the Premier League, he took off his shirt once again and was booked as a result. After the match, Wallace, once again, apologised and promised not to do it again, but did not express regret over his actions. He acknowledged of facing a fine from manager Keane. Two years later, Wallace was again sent–off for taking off his shirt after celebrating a goal against Birmingham City, which turned to be a winning goal, in a 2–1 win on 25 April 2009 and was suspended for one match.

In October 2013, Wallace became a victim of a death hoax when Twitter users tweeted that he died in a car crash. Four months later, Wallace spoke in an interview about the tweet for the first time, saying "It was just a lot of rubbish, I don’t know what happened there".

== Career statistics ==
=== Club ===
Appearances and goals by club, season and competition
Club	Season	League			National cup		League cup		Europe		Other		Total	
Club	Season	Division	Apps	Goals	Apps	Goals	Apps	Goals	Apps	Goals	Apps	Goals	Apps	Goals
Celtic	2002–03	Scottish Premier League	0	0	0	0	1	0	0	0	—		1	0
Celtic	2003–04	Scottish Premier League	8	1	2	0	1	0	3 (Note: Two appearances in UEFA Champions League, one in UEFA Cup)	0	—		14	1
Celtic	2004–05	Scottish Premier League	16	0	1	0	1	3	3 (Note: Appearance(s) in UEFA Champions League)	0	—		21	3
Celtic	2005–06	Scottish Premier League	11	0	1	0	1	0	1	0	—		14	0
Celtic	2006–07	Scottish Premier League	2	0	—		—		—		—		2	0
Celtic	Total		37	1	4	0	4	3	7	0	—		52	4
Sunderland	2006–07	Championship	32	6	1	0	—		—		—		33	6
Sunderland	2007–08	Premier League	21	2	0	0	1	0	—		—		22	2
Sunderland	Total		53	8	1	0	1	0	—		—		55	8
Preston North End	2008–09	Championship	39	5	1	0	2	0	—		2 (Note: Appearances in Championship play-offs)	0	44	5
Preston North End	2009–10	Championship	41	7	2	0	2	0	—		—		45	7
Preston North End	Total		80	12	3	0	4	0	—		2	0	89	12
Burnley	2010–11	Championship	40	3	2	0	1	0	—		—		43	3
Burnley	2011–12	Championship	44	5	1	0	4	1	—		—		49	6
Burnley	2012–13	Championship	36	3	1	0	3	0	—		—		40	3
Burnley	2013–14	Championship	14	0	0	0	1	0	—		—		15	0
Burnley	2014–15	Premier League	15	1	2	1	1	0	—		—		18	2
Burnley	Total		149	12	6	1	10	1	—		—		165	14
Sheffield Wednesday	2015–16	Championship	40	3	2	0	3	1	—		3	2	48	6
Sheffield Wednesday	2016–17	Championship	41	5	1	0	1	0	—		2	0	45	5
Sheffield Wednesday	2017–18	Championship	27	2	2	0	2	0	—		—		31	2
Sheffield Wednesday	Total		108	10	5	0	6	1	—		5	2	124	13
Fleetwood Town	2018–19	League One	36	1	2	0	0	0	—		—		38	1
Fleetwood Town	2019–20	League One	3	0	0	0	1	0	—		—		4	0
Fleetwood Town	Total		39	1	2	0	1	0	—		—		42	1
St Mirren	2019–20	Scottish Premiership	3	0	0	0	0	0	—		—		3	0
Career total			469	44	21	1	26	5	7	0	7	2	530	52

=== International ===
Appearances and goals by national team and year
National team	Year	Apps	Goals
Scotland	2009	1	0
Total		1	0

== Honours ==
Celtic

- Scottish Premier League: 2005–06
- Scottish Cup: 2003–04
- Scottish League Cup: 2005–06

Sunderland

- Football League Championship: 2006–07

Burnley

- Football League Championship runner-up: 2013–14
