= Aiden McGeady =

Irish footballer (born 1986)

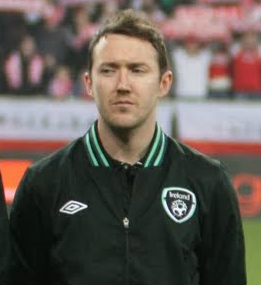
- McGeady lining up for the Republic of Ireland in 2013

Personal information
- Full name: Aiden John McGeady
- Date of birth: 4 April 1986 (age 40)
- Place of birth: Rutherglen, Scotland
- Height: 1.80 m (5 ft 11 in)
- Position: Winger

Youth career
- 1994–1997: Busby Boys Club
- 1997–2000: Queen's Park
- 2000–2004: Celtic

Senior career*
Years	Team	Apps	(Gls)
2004–2010	Celtic	185	(31)
2010–2014	Spartak Moscow	72	(11)
2014–2017	Everton	32	(1)
2016	→ Sheffield Wednesday (loan)	13	(1)
2016–2017	→ Preston North End (loan)	34	(8)
2017–2022	Sunderland	127	(29)
2020	→ Charlton Athletic (loan)	10	(0)
2022–2023	Hibernian	9	(0)
2023–2024	Ayr United	16	(2)
Total		498	(83)

International career
2002	Republic of Ireland U17	3	(0)
2003	Republic of Ireland U19	1	(0)
2004–2006	Republic of Ireland U21	11	(1)
2004–2017	Republic of Ireland	93	(5)
- * Club domestic league appearances and goals

Aiden John McGeady (born 4 April 1986) is a former professional footballer. He played for clubs including Celtic, Spartak Moscow, Everton and Sunderland, and won 93 caps for the Republic of Ireland.

McGeady started his senior career at the Scottish Premier League club Celtic, with whom he won four league titles, two Scottish Cups, and one Scottish League Cup. He moved to Russian club Spartak Moscow in 2010 for a record fee for a player from Scotland, and was a runner-up in the Russian Premier League. In January 2014, McGeady moved to English club Everton. Whilst at Everton, McGeady was loaned to Sheffield Wednesday and Preston North End before joining Sunderland in the summer of 2017. After five years with Sunderland, McGeady signed for Hibernian in June 2022. In July 2023, McGeady joined Ayr United.

McGeady was born in Scotland, but played international football for the Republic of Ireland, qualifying through his Irish grandparents. He played for the Ireland U17, U19 and U21 teams, before making his senior international debut in 2004. He went on to play 93 games and was part of the Irish squads at UEFA Euro 2012 and UEFA Euro 2016.

== Early life ==
McGeady was born in Rutherglen, Scotland. He attended Trinity High School (Rutherglen) for a short period before attending St Ninian's High School, Giffnock.

His father, John McGeady, was also a professional football player for Sheffield United.

== Club career ==
=== Celtic ===
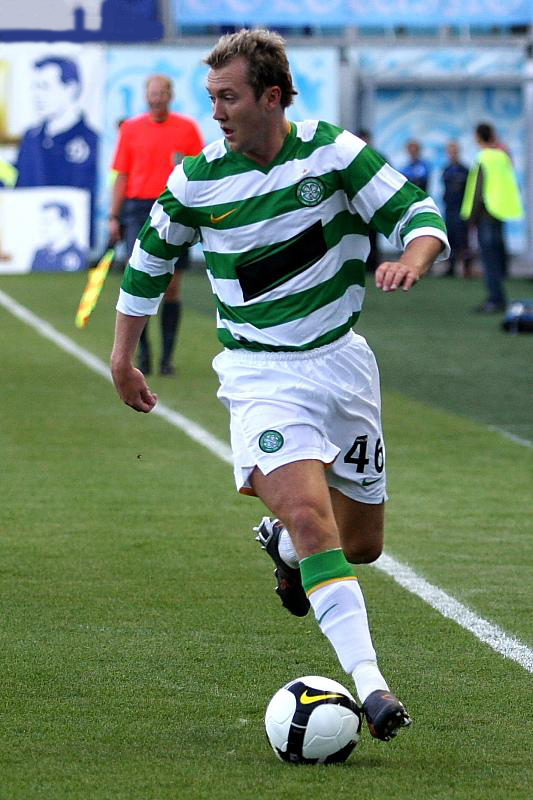
McGeady playing for Celtic in August 2009

McGeady began his career with Queen's Park, having played as a child with a local youth team, Busby Boys Club. After several trials with clubs in England, including several visits to Arsenal, he joined Celtic while still in his early teens. He progressed through the academy alongside Charlie Mulgrew, playing with the youth and reserve teams, and won the Scottish Youth Cup in 2003.

His senior debut, at age 18, came on 24 April 2004 in a league game against Hearts at Tynecastle late in the 2003–04 season. He started the match, scored a goal after 17 minutes, and finished that season with four league appearances as Celtic won the league. He made his UEFA Champions League debut the next season in a game against Italian side AC Milan and made the breakthrough into the first team that same season, with 27 appearances in the league as Celtic finished runners-up in Martin O'Neill's final campaign with the club. He also featured as a late substitute in the season's Scottish Cup Final in which Celtic defeated Dundee United 1–0.

McGeady's 2005–06 season was hampered by a persistent knee injury and he struggled to secure a starting place ahead of Shaun Maloney and Shunsuke Nakamura, but still managed to make 19 appearances over the course of the season as Celtic won the league title.

The 2006–07 season saw Maloney leave Celtic for Aston Villa in January 2007, giving McGeady an opportunity to secure a regular starting place. He played regularly from that point in the Celtic team that again won the SPL championship and also qualified for the knockout stage of the Champions League for the first time in club history, defeating Manchester United, Benfica and Copenhagen in the group stage before losing 1–0 to eventual champions AC Milan in extra time. McGeady also started the 2007 Scottish Cup Final victory over Dunfermline Athletic.

McGeady had a superb 2007–08 season, earning praise from the media, fans, and fellow players. One of his most memorable performances came against Aberdeen: he scored a goal and set up three, including a second goal for striker Scott McDonald with a 360-degree turn and cross. He continued to provide goals for his team: most important was McDonald's equalising goal against rivals Rangers in a match that Celtic went on to win 3–2 and which proved to be crucial in Celtic's successful defence of their title. Throughout the season, he contributed a total of eight goals and 24 assists and was awarded (by vote of his fellow players) the SPFA Player of the Year and Young Player of the Year on 20 April 2008, only the second player ever (after Shaun Maloney in 2006) to receive both awards in the same season. The club reached the knockout stages of the Champions League for a second consecutive season and won the league title for the third year in a row, overhauling Rangers with one week left and winning at Dundee United on the final day of the season to clinch the trophy.

McGeady entered 2008–09 as Celtic's star player but his performances suffered as Celtic endured a poor second half to the season. On 16 December 2008, after a much-publicised dressing room row with manager Gordon Strachan, McGeady was fined two weeks' wages and suspended for two matches, although Strachan later denied any fallout between him and McGeady. Although they won the 2009 Scottish League Cup Final, with McGeady one of the scorers, Celtic finished runners-up to Rangers on the final day of the season.

2009–10 began well for McGeady as he scored two goals against Aberdeen on the opening day of the season. McGeady's form improved: he stayed injury-free while contributing seven goals and 16 assists in 35 league appearances. Ross County knocked Celtic out of the Scottish Cup and Celtic ended the season trophyless for the first time since 2003, having finished in second place in the SPL.

=== Spartak Moscow ===
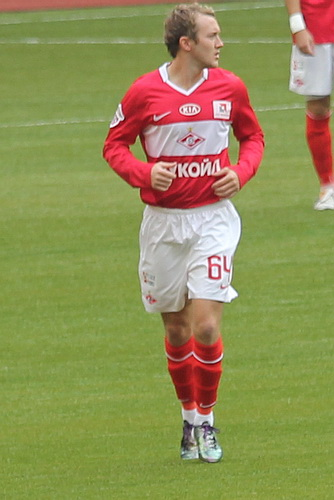
McGeady playing for Spartak Moscow in September 2010

In August 2010, McGeady joined Russian side Spartak Moscow, signing a four-and-a-half-year contract. The fee of £9.5 million made McGeady the most expensive player from Scottish football. He made his league debut in September, a 2–1 win against Saturn. He scored his first goal for Spartak in a 2–2 draw at home to Amkar later the same month. In the last game of the season, McGeady was sent off for a late challenge on Marcin Kowalczyk in the derby against Dynamo Moscow. He was included in the Russian Football Union's list of 33 top players, published in December 2010, which named McGeady the second-best right winger.

The 2011–12 season started with McGeady scoring a late goal against FC Basel, putting Spartak through to the last 16 of the UEFA Europa League. In his first full season he made 31 appearances, scoring three times, but expressed a desire to leave the club once his contract ran out.

After starting the 2012–13 season by scoring in a 2–1 win over Volga, McGeady received his first red card of that season, getting sent off in a 5–0 defeat to FC Zenit Saint Petersburg on 11 August 2012. Spartak were knocked out of the UEFA Champions League by McGeady's former club, Celtic. In May 2013, McGeady received a red card for the second time in the season after he struck an opponent, and then made an offensive gesture as he left the pitch. He was accused of vandalising a dressing room door at Saransk Stadium and was warned that he could face police action. He was originally suspended for six matches; the Russian Football Union reduced his suspension to two matches. After serving the two-match ban, he made his return in the last game of the season, where he provided an assist in a 2–0 win against Alania Vladikavkaz. At season's end, McGeady had made 23 appearances and scored five times.

McGeady scored his first goal of 2013–14 and provided an assist as Spartak won 2–0 against Ural Sverdlovsk Oblast. In September, he had a hat-trick of assists in a 3–2 win over Krasnodar, but he was disciplined, sent to train with the club's youth team, and was later placed on the transfer list after ignoring team orders. Despite the incident, manager Valeri Karpin said that McGeady could make it back to the first team.

=== Everton ===
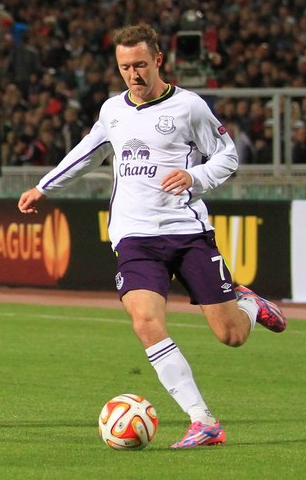
McGeady playing for Everton in October 2014

In January 2014, McGeady joined English club Everton of the Premier League on a four-and-a-half-year contract for an undisclosed fee. He made his debut by coming on as a substitute in a 1–1 draw away to West Bromwich Albion. McGeady was mainly used as a substitute as he made just three starts in his first season, helping Everton to record their best-ever points tally in the Premier League era (72) and a fifth-place finish.

McGeady scored his first goal for Everton on 16 August 2014, curling in the ball in off the post in a 2–2 draw with Leicester City on the opening day of the 2014–15 Premier League season. A knee injury in January 2015 saw McGeady lose his place in the team to Aaron Lennon, who signed for Everton during the transfer window that same month. McGeady only featured twice for Everton for the rest of the season, making two late second-half substitute appearances in May 2015. By November 2015 he had made only one appearance, in a League Cup tie against Barnsley on 26 August during which he was taken off at half-time. McGeady was not assigned a squad number for the 2016–17 season.

==== Sheffield Wednesday (loan) ====
On 1 February 2016, McGeady signed for Sheffield Wednesday on loan for the remainder of the 2015–16 season, with manager Carlos Carvalhal stating that he had attempted to sign McGeady while managing Sporting Lisbon. McGeady scored his first goal for Sheffield Wednesday in a 3–0 win at Nottingham Forest on 12 March 2016. McGeady was left out of Carvalhal's squads for both legs of the playoff semi-final against Brighton and the playoff final against Hull after a series of poor performances.

==== Preston North End (loan) ====
On 31 August 2016, McGeady signed for Preston North End on a season-long loan. Playing regularly appeared to help McGeady recover some of his best form and he was awarded the Championship Player of the Month for February after scoring three goals and providing four assists. His 25-yard strike against Huddersfield Town was nominated for Championship Goal of the Month for April, but Sébastien Pocognoli won the award. After scoring eight goals in 35 appearances during his stint at Deepdale, he was named as Preston's player of the year.

=== Sunderland ===
McGeady signed a three-year contract with Sunderland on 13 July 2017, reuniting him with former Preston manager Simon Grayson. He made his debut on 4 August 2017, in a 1–1 draw with Derby County. McGeady scored his first goal for Sunderland the following weekend on 13 August 2017 in a 3–1 victory on Norwich City, along with two assists in the same match.

He was nominated for League One Player of the Month twice in 2018–19, winning the award for February. His performances saw him recognized by his peers as he made Team of the Year and was shortlisted for Player of the Year in League One. Luton Town's James Collins won the individual accolade; McGeady was voted the Supporters Player of the Year.

In July 2019, he signed a one-year contract extension with the club. However, following speculation regarding his future at the club due to off-field incidents, manager Phil Parkinson announced on 12 December 2019 that he had told McGeady the winger had no future at the club.

Following this announcement, McGeady joined Charlton Athletic on loan for the rest of the 2019–20 season on 31 January 2020. On 20 June 2020, this was further extended, due to the extension of the Championship season.

McGeady made his first Sunderland appearance in over a year under new head coach Lee Johnson, playing 77 minutes in a 1–0 home defeat to Wigan Athletic on 6 December 2020. On 13 February 2021, McGeady was part of the team that won 4–1 against promotion rivals Doncaster Rovers, with him providing all 4 assists to Sunderland's goals, all scored by Charlie Wyke. By the end of the Rovers match, McGeady had recorded eight assists in his first 12 games since his return. He and Wyke were shortlisted for February's Player of the Month in the league.

Following the 2020–21 season, McGeady was named in the 2020–21 EFL League One Team of the Season at the league's annual awards ceremony. Following promotion through the play-offs at the end of the 2021–22 season, McGeady was released after five years at the club.

=== Hibernian ===
McGeady signed a one-year contract with Scottish club Hibernian on 24 June 2022, reuniting him with former Sunderland manager Lee Johnson. McGeady made 4 Scottish League Cup appearances for the club in July but an ankle injury kept him out of action for a long spell. He returned to action in December, but suffered a hamstring injury on 18 February 2023 in a game against Kilmarnock. It was later confirmed that the injury would prevent him from playing for the rest of the 2022–23 season, with the injury set to keep him out for four to six months. McGeady was released by Hibs at the end of the 2022–23 season.

=== Ayr United ===
On 21 July 2023, McGeady signed a two-year deal with Scottish Championship club Ayr United and also took up the role as technical manager with the club. He left by mutual consent on 1 October 2024.

On 17 October 2024, McGeady announced his retirement from football at the age of 38.

== International career ==
McGeady played for Scotland Schools while at Queen's Park. He played in an under-13 World Cup tournament in Paris. After Queen's Park he joined Celtic, who had a policy of not permitting their youths to play for their school teams due to conflicting kick off times. Scotland had a rule which would not permit a player who did not play for their school team to be considered for a call-up to Scotland Schools' selects.

The Republic of Ireland had no such rule preventing a player from being selected and instructed Donegal-born former Celtic player Packie Bonner, who knew of McGeady's Irish heritage, to invite McGeady to play for the Republic of Ireland Under-15 Schoolboys team. McGeady qualified for Ireland through his paternal grandparents, who hail from the Gaeltacht area of Gweedore, County Donegal. McGeady accepted the offer and joined the Irish youth setup. McGeady was later named in a Scotland under-16 squad, and Scotland head coach Berti Vogts attempted to persuade him, but he declined the invitation, citing his experience in the Irish set-up.

McGeady made his full debut for the Republic of Ireland in July 2004 against Jamaica. He has made over 90 appearances for Ireland and featured often under manager Giovanni Trapattoni, appearing in each of his squads. However, he lost his place in the starting line-up during the 2010 World Cup qualifiers.

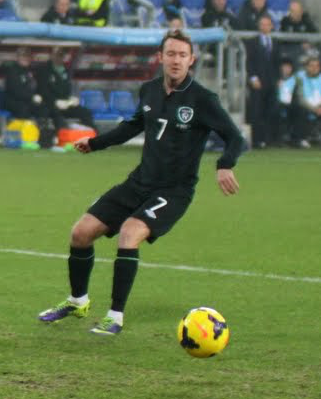
McGeady in action for the Republic of Ireland against Poland, November 2013.

On 26 March 2011, McGeady scored his first goal for Ireland in the Aviva Stadium against Macedonia in a Euro 2012 qualifier, with Ireland winning 2–1. On 7 October 2011, McGeady scored his second international goal against Andorra thanks to a deflection off an Andorra defender to make the game 2–0. In the first leg of the UEFA Euro 2012 play-off against Estonia, McGeady provided the assist for the first goal when his cross found the head of Keith Andrews who scored. The game finished 4–0 to Ireland.

McGeady was named in Trapattoni's 23-man squad for the 2012 European Championships in Poland and Ukraine. McGeady set up Ireland's first and only goal of the tournament from a free-kick, converted by Leicester City's Sean St Ledger in the 3–1 defeat to Croatia.

In Martin O'Neill's first game as Irish manager, McGeady scored his first international goal for over two years in a 3–0 win over Latvia. In September 2014, McGeady scored both of Ireland's goals against Georgia in a 2–1 away victory in the opening game of the Euro 2016 qualifiers. Despite having made only 13 appearances at club level in the preceding season, he was selected for the Ireland squad for the finals tournament, and appeared as a substitute in each of the three group games (a draw with Sweden, a defeat to Belgium and a win over Italy).

McGeady was shortlisted for FAI Senior International Player of the Year in 2014, but lost out to John O'Shea.

== Style of play ==
A two-footed player, McGeady is known for his speed, skill, and creativity with the ball on the wing, as well as his dribbling skills, technique, close control, ball playing ability, and use of feints and trickery in possession.

He is known for using a turn which includes him dragging the ball with his foot behind his standing foot, in a similar manner to the Cruyff Turn, then using the outside of his boot to move the ball away from his defender. This move has come to be known as the McGeady Spin in his honour, and has been included in EA Sports' FIFA video game series.

== Career statistics ==
=== Club ===
Appearances and goals by club, season and competition
Club	Season	League			National cup (Note: Includes Scottish Cup, Russian Cup, FA Cup)		League cup (Note: Includes Scottish League Cup, Football League Cup)		Europe		Other		Total	
Club	Season	Division	Apps	Goals	Apps	Goals	Apps	Goals	Apps	Goals	Apps	Goals	Apps	Goals
Celtic	2003–04	Scottish Premier League	4	1	0	0	0	0	0	0	–		4	1
Celtic	2004–05	Scottish Premier League	27	4	5	0	2	1	3 (Note: Appearance(s) in UEFA Champions League)	0	–		37	5
Celtic	2005–06	Scottish Premier League	20	4	1	0	2	0	1	0	–		24	4
Celtic	2006–07	Scottish Premier League	34	5	4	0	2	0	6	0	–		46	5
Celtic	2007–08	Scottish Premier League	36	7	4	0	1	0	10	1	–		51	8
Celtic	2008–09	Scottish Premier League	29	3	3	1	4	2	4	1	–		40	7
Celtic	2009–10	Scottish Premier League	35	7	4	0	2	0	9 (Note: Four appearances in UEFA Champions League, five in UEFA Europa League)	0	–		50	7
Celtic	Total		185	31	21	1	13	3	33	2	–		252	37
Spartak Moscow	2010	Russian Premier League	11	2	0	0	—		12 (Note: Six appearances in UEFA Champions League, six appearances and one goal in UEFA Europa League)	1	–		23	3
Spartak Moscow	2011–12	Russian Premier League	31	3	3	1	—		0	0	–		34	4
Spartak Moscow	2012–13	Russian Premier League	17	5	1	0	—		5	0	–		23	5
Spartak Moscow	2013–14	Russian Premier League	13	1	0	0	—		0	0	–		13	1
Spartak Moscow	Total		72	11	4	1	0	0	17	1	–		93	13
Everton	2013–14	Premier League	16	0	2	0	—		—		—		18	0
Everton	2014–15	Premier League	16	1	2	0	1	0	5 (Note: Appearances in UEFA Europa League)	0	—		24	1
Everton	2015–16	Premier League	0	0	0	0	1	0	—		—		1	0
Everton	2016–17	Premier League	0	0	—		—		—		—		0	0
Everton	Total		32	1	4	0	2	0	5	0	—		43	1
Sheffield Wednesday (loan)	2015–16	Championship	13	1	0	0	—		—		—		13	1
Preston North End (loan)	2016–17	Championship	34	8	1	0	0	0	—		—		35	8
Sunderland	2017–18	Championship	35	7	0	0	2	0	—		—		37	7
Sunderland	2018–19	League One	34	11	2	1	0	0	—		4 (Note: Three appearances and two goals in EFL Trophy, one appearance in League One play-offs)	2	40	14
Sunderland	2019–20	League One	15	4	2	1	2	1	—		2 (Note: Appearances in EFL Trophy)	0	21	6
Sunderland	2020–21	League One	29	4	0	0	0	0	—		7 (Note: Five appearances and two goals in EFL Trophy, two appearances in the League One play-offs)	2	36	6
Sunderland	2021–22	League One	14	3	0	0	2	0	—		0	0	16	3
Sunderland	Total		127	29	4	2	6	1	—		13	4	150	36
Charlton Athletic (loan)	2019–20	Championship	10	0	—		—		—		—		10	0
Hibernian	2022–23	Scottish Premiership	9	0	1	0	4	0	—		—		14	0
Ayr United	2023–24	Scottish Championship	16	2	1	0	1	0	—		1 (Note: Appearance(s) in Scottish Challenge Cup)	0	19	2
Career total			498	83	36	4	26	4	55	3	14	4	629	98

=== International ===
Appearances and goals by national team and year
National team	Year	Apps	Goals
Republic of Ireland	2004	2	0
Republic of Ireland	2005	1	0
Republic of Ireland	2006	5	0
Republic of Ireland	2007	8	0
Republic of Ireland	2008	6	0
Republic of Ireland	2009	9	0
Republic of Ireland	2010	6	0
Republic of Ireland	2011	9	2
Republic of Ireland	2012	11	0
Republic of Ireland	2013	6	1
Republic of Ireland	2014	11	2
Republic of Ireland	2015	5	0
Republic of Ireland	2016	7	0
Republic of Ireland	2017	7	0
Total		93	5

Scores and results list the Republic of Ireland's goal tally first, score column indicates score after each McGeady goal.

List of international goals scored by Aiden McGeady
No.	Date	Venue	Opponent	Score	Result	Competition
1	26 March 2011	Aviva Stadium, Dublin, Ireland	Macedonia	1–0	2–1	UEFA Euro 2012 qualifying
2	7 October 2011	Estadi Comunal d'Aixovall, Andorra	Andorra	2–0	2–0	UEFA Euro 2012 qualifying
3	15 November 2013	Aviva Stadium, Dublin, Ireland	Latvia	2–0	3–0	Friendly
4	7 September 2014	Boris Paichadze Dinamo Arena, Tbilisi, Georgia	Georgia	1–0	2–1	UEFA Euro 2016 qualifying
5	7 September 2014	Boris Paichadze Dinamo Arena, Tbilisi, Georgia	Georgia	2–1	2–1	UEFA Euro 2016 qualifying

== Honours ==
Celtic

- Scottish Premier League: 2003–04, 2005–06, 2006–07, 2007–08
- Scottish Cup: 2004–05, 2006–07
- Scottish League Cup: 2008–09

Sunderland

- EFL League One play-offs: 2022
- EFL Trophy: 2020–21; runner-up: 2018–19

Individual

- FAI Young International Player of the Year: 2008
- PFA Scotland Players' Player of the Year: 2007–08
- PFA Scotland Young Player of the Year: 2007–08
- PFA Scotland Team of the Year (SPL): 2007–08, 2008–09
- SPL Young Player of the Year: 2007–08
- BBC Sportsound Player of the Year: 2007–08
- Celtic FC Fans Player of the Year: 2007–08
- Celtic FC Players' Player of the Year: 2007–08, 2009–10
- Celtic FC Young Player of the Year: 2004–05, 2005–06, 2006–07
- SPL Player of the Month: December 2004, November 2007, February 2008
- SPL Young Player of the Month: March 2005, November 2005, August 2006, September 2006
- Russian Football Union Top 33: 2010, 2011–12
- FAI International Goal of the Year: 2014
- Preston North End FC Player of the Year: 2016–17
- EFL Championship Player of the Month: February 2017
- PFA Team of the Year: 2018–19 League One, 2020–21 League One
- Sunderland Player of the Year: 2018–19
- Preston North End FC Team of the Decade: 2010–19
- EFL League One Player of the Month: February 2019
- EFL League One Team of the Season: 2020–21

== See also ==
- List of Republic of Ireland international footballers born outside the Republic of Ireland
