= Celtic F.C. Player of the Year =

Scottish football club award

Celtic Player of the Year award is an annual awards ceremony held by Celtic. It has been held every year since 2003 when Bobo Baldé was awarded the first ever Celtic Player of the Year award.

== Winners ==
=== 2002–03 ===
- Celtic Player of the Year: Bobo Baldé
- Players' Player of The Year: Henrik Larsson
- Young Player of The Year: Shaun Maloney
- Goal of The Season: John Hartson - Goal against Liverpool in a 2–0 away win at Anfield.

=== 2003–04 ===
- Celtic Player of The Year: Neil Lennon
- Players' Player of the Year: Jackie McNamara
- Young Player of the Year: Stephen Pearson
- Goal of the Season: Alan Thompson- Goal against Rangers in a 3–0 win at Celtic Park
- Lifetime Achievement Award: John Clark

=== 2004–05 ===
- Celtic Player of The Year: Stiliyan Petrov
- Young Player of The Year: Aiden McGeady

=== 2005–06 ===
- Celtic Player of The Year: Neil Lennon
- Young Player of The Year: Aiden McGeady

=== 2006–07 ===
- Celtic Player of The Year: Shunsuke Nakamura
- Young Player of The Year: Aiden McGeady

=== 2007–08 ===
- Celtic Player of the Year: Aiden McGeady
- Young Player of The Year: Paul Caddis

=== 2008–09 ===
- Celtic Player of the Year: Scott Brown

=== 2009–10 ===
- Celtic Player of The Year: Robbie Keane
- Players' Player of the Year: Aiden McGeady
- Young Celtic Player of the Year: Josh Thompson
- Goal of the Season: Paddy McCourt vs St Mirren
- Top Goalscorer: Robbie Keane
- Special Recognition: John Kennedy

=== 2010–11 ===
- Celtic Player of The Year: Emilio Izaguirre
- Players' Player of The Year: Emilio Izaguirre
- Young Player of The Year: James Forrest
- Goal of the Season: Scott Brown vs Rangers
- Top Goalscorer: Gary Hooper
- Special Recognition: Paddy Sweeney and Peter Rafferty

=== 2011–12 ===
- Celtic Player of the Year: Charlie Mulgrew
- Players' Player of the Year: Charlie Mulgrew
- Young Player of the Year: James Forrest
- Goal of the Season: Dylan McGeouch vs St Mirren
- Top Goalscorer: Gary Hooper
- Special Recognition: Kibera Celtic

=== 2012–13 ===
- Celtic Player of the Year: Georgios Samaras
- Players' Player of the Year: Fraser Forster
- Young Player of the Year: Victor Wanyama
- Goal of the Season: Tony Watt vs Barcelona
- Top Goalscorer: Gary Hooper
- Special Recognition: Stiliyan Petrov

=== 2013–14 ===
- Celtic Player of The Year: Kris Commons
- Players' Player of the Year: Fraser Forster & Virgil van Dijk
- Young Player of the Year: Darnell Fisher
- Academy Player of the Year: Liam Henderson
- Top Goalscorer: Kris Commons
- Goal of the Season: Kris Commons - Goal against Shakhter Karagandy in a 3–0 win at Celtic Park, UEFA Champions League qualifier
- Special Recognition: Fraser Forster

=== 2014–15 ===
- Celtic Player of The Year: Stefan Johansen
- Players' Player of the Year: Stefan Johansen & Scott Brown
- Young Player of the Year: Jason Denayer
- Academy Player of the Year: Eoghan O'Connell
- Top Goalscorer: Leigh Griffiths
- Goal of the Season: Kris Commons- Goal against Rangers in a 2–0 win at Hampden Park, Scottish League Cup semi-final
- Special Recognition: Eric J. Reilly

=== 2015–16 ===
- Celtic Player of The Year: Leigh Griffiths
- Players' Player of the Year: Leigh Griffiths
- Young Player of the Year: Kieran Tierney
- Academy Player of the Year: Aidan Nesbitt
- Top Goalscorer: Leigh Griffiths
- Goal of the Season: Tom Rogic- Goal against Kilmarnock in a 2–1 win at Rugby Park, SPFL Premiership match
- Special Recognition: Lubomir Moravcik

=== 2016–17 ===
- Celtic Player of The Year: Scott Sinclair
- Players' Player of the Year: Scott Sinclair
- Young Player of the Year: Kieran Tierney
- Academy Player of the Year: Jack Aitchison
- Celtic Women's Player of the Year: Kerry Montgomery
- Top Goalscorer: Moussa Dembele
- Goal of the Season: Moussa Dembele - Goal against St Johnstone in a 5–2 win at McDiarmid Park, SPFL Premiership match
- Special Recognition: John Clark

=== 2017–18 ===
- Celtic Player of The Year: Scott Brown
- Players' Player of the Year: Scott Brown
- Young Player of the Year: Kieran Tierney
- Academy Player of the Year: Anthony Ralston
- Celtic Women's Player of the Year: Natalie Ross
- Top Goalscorer: Scott Sinclair
- Goal of the Season: Kieran Tierney - Goal against Kilmarnock in a 5–0 win at Celtic Park, Scottish League Cup match
- Special Recognition: Scott Brown

=== 2018–19 ===
- Celtic Player of the Year: Callum McGregor
- Players' Player of the Year: Callum McGregor
- Young Player of the Year: Kristoffer Ajer
- Academy Player of the Year: Mikey Johnston
- Celtic Women's Player of the Year: Keeva Keenan
- Top Goalscorer: Odsonne Edouard
- Goal of the Season: Scott Brown - Goal against St Johnstone in a 5–0 win at Celtic Park, Scottish Cup match
- Special Recognition: Angie Thomson (kit manager, posthumous)

=== 2019–20 ===
- Celtic Player of the Year: Odsonne Édouard
- Young Player of the Year: Jeremie Frimpong
- Top Goalscorer: Odsonne Édouard
- Goal of the Season: Olivier Ntcham, Celtic's second goal against Lazio in a 2–1 win at Stadio Olimpico, UEFA Europa League match

=== 2021–22 ===
- Celtic Player of the Year: Callum McGregor
- Young Player of the Year: Liel Abada
- Academy Player of the Year: Stephen Welsh
- Top Goalscorer: Kyōgo Furuhashi
- Magners Goal of the Season: Kyōgo Furuhashi for his winning goal in League Cup Final at Hampden in December 2021
- Women’s Player of the Year: Jacynta Galabadaarachchi
- Special Recognition Award: Wim Jansen (posthumous)

=== 2022–23 ===
- Celtic Player of the Year: Kyōgo Furuhashi
- Young Player of the Year: Matt O'Riley
- Academy Player of the Year: Ben Summers
- Top Goalscorer: Kyōgo Furuhashi
- Players' Player of the Year: Kyōgo Furuhashi
- Women’s Player of the Year: Caitlin Hayes
- Women’s Players' Player of the Year: Caitlin Hayes

=== 2023–24 ===
- Men's Player of the Year: Matt O'Riley
- Young Player of the Year: Matt O'Riley
- Academy Player of the Year: Daniel Kelly
- Top Goalscorer(s): Kyōgo Furuhashi & Amy Gallacher
- Men's Players' Player of the Year: Matt O'Riley
- Women’s Player of the Year: Caitlin Hayes
- Women’s Players' Player of the Year: Amy Gallacher
- Men's Goal of the Season: Kyōgo Furuhashi, for his goal against Rangers in a 2–1 win in a Scottish Premiership match
- Women's Goal of the Season: Natasha Flint, against Rangers
- Special Recognition: Brian Potter (posthumous)
- Legendary Player of the Year: Scott Brown
- Legendary Goal of the Season: Shunsuke Nakamura, free-kick against Manchester United in a 1-0 win at Celtic Park, UEFA Champions League match in November 2006
- Outstanding Contribution Award: Henrik Larsson

=== 2024–25 ===
- Men's Player of the Year: Daizen Maeda
- Young Player of the Year: Arne Engels
- Academy Player of the Year: Kyle Ure
- Men's Top Goalscorer(s) of the Year: Daizen Maeda
- Men's Players' Player of the Year: Daizen Maeda
- Women’s Player of the Year: Shannon McGregor
- Women’s Players' Player of the Year: Ceyla Barclais
- Women's Top Goalscorer(s) of the Year: Saoirse Noonan
- Men's Goal of the Season: Cameron Carter-Vickers, for his goal against Kilmarnock in a 5–0 win in a Scottish Premiership match
- Women's Goal of the Season: Shannon McGregor, against FC Gintra in a UEFA Women's Champions League match
- Special Recognition Award: James Forrest

=== 2025–26 ===
- Men's Player of the Year: Benjamin Nygren
- Young Player of the Year: Yang Hyun-jun
- Academy Player of the Year: Hayden Borland
- Men's Top Goalscorer(s) of the Year: Benjamin Nygren
- Men's Players' Player of the Year: Benjamin Nygren
- Women’s Player of the Year: Kelly Clark
- Women’s Players' Player of the Year: Morgan Cross
- Women's Top Goalscorer(s) of the Year: Saoirse Noonan
- Men's Goal of the Season: Yang Hyun-jun, for his goal against Rangers in a 1–3 loss in a Scottish Premiership match
- Women's Goal of the Season: Maria McAneny, for her goal against Hibernian in a 2-1 win in a Scottish Women's Premier League match
- Special Recognition Award: Jackie Dow

== See also ==
- List of Celtic F.C. seasons
