= Steve Walford =

English footballer (born 1958)

Personal information
- Full name: Stephen Joseph Walford
- Date of birth: 5 January 1958 (age 68)
- Place of birth: Highgate, England
- Height: 6 ft 1 in (1.85 m)
- Position: Defender

Senior career*
Years	Team	Apps	(Gls)
1975–1977	Tottenham Hotspur	2	(0)
1977–1981	Arsenal	77	(3)
1981–1983	Norwich City	93	(2)
1983–1989	West Ham United	115	(2)
1987	→ Huddersfield Town (loan)	12	(0)
1988	→ Gillingham (loan)	4	(0)
1989	→ West Bromwich Albion (loan)	4	(0)
1989	Lai Sun		
- Wycombe Wanderers
Total		307	(7)

International career
1976	England Youth	1	(0)
- * Club domestic league appearances and goals

Stephen Joseph Walford (born 5 January 1958) is an English former football player and manager. He played as a defender for clubs such as Tottenham Hotspur, Arsenal, Norwich City, West Ham United, and West Bromwich Albion.

After his playing career, Walford has worked as a coach, often assisting Martin O'Neill.

== Early life ==
Walford was born in Highgate, London.

== Playing career ==
Walford began playing as a centre half. He started his footballing career at Tottenham Hotspur in 1974. At Spurs, he made only two appearances before being signed in 1977 by Arsenal to play under former Spurs manager Terry Neill in a deal worth £25,000. Walford went on to play as a substitute in Arsenal's victorious 1979 FA Cup Final side. All in all, he made 98 appearances and scored four goals for the Gunners. In 1981, he moved to Norwich City for £175,000. Whilst with Norwich, he suffered relegation and thereafter saw them being promoted to the First Division.

After 108 appearances for Norwich, Walford moved on to West Ham United in 1983 for a fee of £160,000; he played 115 times for the Hammers over the next four years, including being a regular member of the West Ham side which finished third in the league in 1986.

Towards the end of his West Ham career, he had loan spells at Huddersfield Town, Gillingham, and West Bromwich Albion. He moved abroad to play for Lai Sun of Hong Kong in 1989 before returning to England to play for Wycombe Wanderers under Martin O'Neill the following year.

== Coaching career ==
After a brief spell at Wealdstone, Walford returned to Wycombe to become O'Neill's assistant, who he previously worked alongside at Norwich City, Leicester City, Celtic, Aston Villa, and Sunderland. On 5 November 2013, O'Neill became manager of the Republic of Ireland national football team, and so Walford joined up with his coaching staff. Walford left the Ireland coaching staff in late 2018 for personal reasons.

On 18 September 2015, he returned to club football after being appointed as the Assistant Manager to Neil Lennon at Bolton Wanderers, replacing Johan Mjallby who left for personal reasons. He lasted just seven months in his role at Bolton and on 14 April 2016 left the club along with Garry Parker following the club's relegation from the Championship.

== Honours ==
=== Player ===
Arsenal

- FA Cup: 1978–79

=== Coach ===
Leicester

- Football League First Division Play-offs: 1995–96
- League Cup: 1996-97, 1999-2000

Celtic

- Scottish Premier League: 2000–01, 2001–02, 2003–04
- Scottish Cup: 2000–01, 2003–04, 2004–05
- Scottish League Cup: 2000–01
