= Stanislav Varga =

Slovak footballer (born 1972)

Personal information
- Full name: Stanislav Varga
- Date of birth: 8 October 1972 (age 54)
- Place of birth: Lipany, Czechoslovakia
- Height: 6 ft 2 in (1.88 m)
- Position: Centre back

Youth career
- 1982–1985: Lipany

Senior career*
Years	Team	Apps	(Gls)
1992–1998	Tatran Prešov	104	(10)
1998–2000	Slovan Bratislava	56	(12)
2000–2003	Sunderland	21	(1)
2002	→ West Bromwich Albion (loan)	4	(0)
2003–2006	Celtic	80	(10)
2006–2008	Sunderland	20	(1)
2008	→ Burnley (loan)	10	(0)
Total		295	(34)

International career
1997–2006	Slovakia	54	(2)

Managerial career
- 2011–2013: Odeva Lipany
- 2013–2014: Tatran Prešov (assistant manager)
- 2013–2014: Tatran Prešov juniori
- 2014–2016: Tatran Prešov
- 2018–2022: Dukla Banská Bystrica
- 2022–2023: Sandecja Nowy Sącz
- 2023–2024: Tatran Liptovský Mikuláš
- * Club domestic league appearances and goals

Stanislav Varga (born 8 October 1972) is a Slovak professional football manager and former player who was most recently the manager of Tatran Liptovský Mikuláš.

Varga was playing in his native Slovakia when he was recruited by Sunderland in 2000. He won the man of the match award in his first game against Arsenal. In 2001–02, he was loaned to West Bromwich Albion and helped the club get promoted to the Premier League. After a long-term injury, Varga never found his way back into the team, and was released in January 2003. He was pikced up by Celtic on a short-term deal that turned into a two-year contract. Ever-present in the side during the 2003–04 campaign, Varga helped his new team to win the domestic double of Scottish Premier League and Scottish Cup. In 2006, Varga returned to Sunderland under new management where he was a fan favourite. However, he was released at the end of the 2007–08 season. He was later hired as the manager of Tatran Liptovský Mikuláš.

Varga played for the Slovakia national football team with over fifty caps and also captained his country on a number of occasions.

== Club career ==
=== Sunderland ===
Varga, a tall and commanding centre-back, was recruited by Peter Reid for £875,000 from Slovan Bratislava during the summer of 2000. Varga began his career at the Stadium of Light with an impressive opening day display in Sunderland's 1–0 victory over Arsenal, picking up the man of the match award. He scored his first Sunderland goal in a 2–0 win over West Ham in January 2001.

He spent the end of 2001–02 on loan with West Bromwich Albion, helping the club get promoted to the Premier League. The towering centre back returned from a long-term injury to find himself out of the first team picture and his last game before going on loan ended when he was taken off at half-time at Old Trafford, where Sunderland lost 4–1. With Joachim Björklund and Jody Craddock ahead of him, Varga never really found his way back into the team, and was released in January 2003.

=== Celtic ===
Less than a month later, Martin O'Neill snapped up the defender on a short-term deal. Despite only making one appearance for Celtic in that time, Varga was rewarded with a two-year contract in July 2003. An ever-present in the side during the 2003–04 campaign, he helped his new teammates to domestic glory, winning the domestic double of Scottish Premier League and Scottish Cup. In the league, Varga helped Celtic concede only 25 goals, which allowed the club to set a new league record of 25 straight wins (32 games unbeaten from the start of the season) and 77 home league games without defeat. He also contributed 7 goals in all competitions.

Successive titles evaded Celtic in the 2004–05 season as they threw away the SPL title on the final day of the season, but they did manage to take consolation in the Scottish Cup final, beating Dundee United 1–0, with Alan Thompson scoring the only goal of the game after 8 minutes from a free-kick. Throughout this season Varga proved to be a rock in the Celtic defence. He even got up-field to score six times, including one in Celtic's 3–1 defeat to A.C. Milan in the UEFA Champions League group stage. During this time he, like Stilian Petrov before him, had his name abbreviated by the Celtic following, Stanislav would now simply be known as "Stan" Varga to the Hoops supporters and Scottish media.

After the 2005–06 season, Varga agreed a new one-year contract at Parkhead. "Stan has signed his new deal at Celtic," his agent Tony McGill told Sky Sports. "Stan is pleased to stay as he did not want to go anywhere else and he has signed a one-year deal."

=== Return to Sunderland ===
On 31 August 2006, he returned to Sunderland under new manager Roy Keane, a former colleague from Celtic, alongside Celtic's Ross Wallace, for a combined fee of up to £1,100,000. He scored his first goal in his second spell at Sunderland in a 4–1 loss at Preston North End in October 2006.

His strong and powerful presence, ability in the air and no nonsense defending has made him a rising fan favourite at the Stadium of Light. Having to act as a substitute behind first choice centre half Nyron Nosworthy, the Slovak chose a one-month loan deal to Burnley on 4 January 2008 to regain match-fitness. He was named in the Championship Team of the Week for his performance in Burnley's 1–0 win over Plymouth Argyle, his first league game for the club.

Sunderland released Varga at the end of the 2007–08 season.

== International career ==
A regular in the Slovakia national side with over fifty caps to his name, Varga also captained his country on a number of occasions. It was during a friendly game against Norway before Euro 2000 that he was first spotted by then-Sunderland manager Peter Reid, impressing the Black Cats' boss with the way he kept Tore André Flo and Ole Gunnar Solskjær out of the game.

== Honours ==
=== As player ===
Celtic

- Scottish Premier League:2003–04, 2005–06
- Scottish Cup: 2003–04, 2004–05
- Scottish League Cup: 2005–06

Sunderland

- Football League Championship: 2006–07

=== As manager ===
Tatran Prešov

- 2. Liga: 2015–16

Dukla B.Bystrica

- 2. Liga runners-up: 2021–22
