= 2010–11 Burnley F.C. season =

English football club season

Burnley
2010–11 season
- Chairman: Barry Kilby
- Manager: Brian Laws (until 29 December 2010); Stuart Gray (caretaker manager); Eddie Howe (from 16 January 2011)
- Ground: Turf Moor
- Championship: 8th
- FA Cup: Fifth round
- League Cup: Fourth round
- Top goalscorer: League: Jay Rodriguez (14); All: Chris Eagles & Jay Rodriguez (15)
- Highest home attendance: 20,453 v Leeds United (11 December 2010)
- Lowest home attendance: 9,442 v Port Vale (8 January 2011)
- Average home league attendance: 14,931
| Home colours | Away colours |

The 2010–11 season was Burnley's 1st season back in the second tier of English football following their relegation from the Premier League. They were managed by Brian Laws in his first full season in charge since replacing Owen Coyle. Burnley finished 8th with 68 points, 7 points outside the playoffs with a goal difference of +4.

== League table ==
| Pos | Team | Pld | W | D | L | GF | GA | GD | Pts | Promotion, qualification or relegation |
|---|---|---|---|---|---|---|---|---|---|---|
| 6 | Nottingham Forest | 46 | 20 | 15 | 11 | 69 | 50 | +19 | 75 | Qualification for Championship play-offs |
| 7 | Leeds United | 46 | 19 | 15 | 12 | 81 | 70 | +11 | 72 | |
| 8 | Burnley | 46 | 18 | 14 | 14 | 65 | 61 | +4 | 68 | |
| 9 | Millwall | 46 | 18 | 13 | 15 | 62 | 48 | +14 | 67 | |
| 10 | Leicester City | 46 | 19 | 10 | 17 | 76 | 71 | +5 | 67 | |

Updated to match(es) played on 7 May 2011. Source: The Football League
Rules for classification: 1) points; 2) goal difference; 3) number of goals scored.

== Match details ==
=== Football League Championship ===
Burnley started the season well, with three wins from their opening five games, including a notable home win over local rivals Preston North End. The Clarets were 3–1 down with just six minutes to go before staging a late comeback to win 4–3.

However, Burnley slid down the table, mainly due to poor away form which left them without an away win until Boxing Day. Their unbeaten home record was lost to Leeds United in early December, when the Clarets surrendered a 2–0 half-time lead to ultimately lose 3–2. The defeat left Burnley in 9th place and four points outside the play-offs, and manager Brian Laws ultimately lost his job following a 2–0 defeat at home to Scunthorpe United.

The appointment of Eddie Howe saw the team regain form and rise to 7th place following a six-game unbeaten run (including another late victory over Preston North End in the reverse fixture). However, a run of five defeats from the next six games ultimately consigned Burnley to another year of second-tier football, finding themselves seven points away from the playoff places with six games remaining.

Three further victories saw the Clarets finish the season in 8th, a disappointing return for a recently relegated side who had aspirations of an immediate return to the Premier League.

Football League Championship match details
| Date | League position | Opponents | Venue | Result | Score F–A | Scorers | Attendance | Ref |
|---|---|---|---|---|---|---|---|---|
| 7 August 2010 | 11th | Nottingham Forest | H | W | 1–0 | Iwelumo 44' | 17,496 | |
| 14 August 2010 | 8th | Ipswich Town | A | D | 1–1 | Carlisle 90' | 19,317 | |
| 21 August 2010 | 3rd | Leicester City | H | W | 3–0 | Wallace 44', Iwelumo 62', Alexander 74' pen. | 15,516 | |
| 28 August 2010 | 5th | Swansea City | A | L | 0–1 | | 15,135 | |
| 11 September 2010 | 5th | Preston North End | H | W | 4–3 | Iwelumo (3) 9', 84', 88', Rodriguez 90' | 15,509 | |
| 14 September 2010 | 6th | Middlesbrough | A | L | 1–2 | Bikey 65' | 15,033 | |
| 18 September 2010 | 8th | Crystal Palace | A | D | 0–0 | | 14,451 | |
| 25 September 2010 | 8th | Bristol City | H | D | 0–0 | | 14,540 | |
| 28 September 2010 | 5th | Hull City | H | W | 4–0 | Iwelumo (2) 14', 53', Eagles (2) 24', 50' pen. | 14,458 | |
| 2 October 2010 | 6th | Millwall | A | D | 1–1 | Rodriguez 22' | 12,330 | |
| 16 October 2010 | 8th | Sheffield United | A | D | 3–3 | Marney 49', Eagles 54' pen., Rodriguez 90' | 22,936 | |
| 19 October 2010 | 4th | Barnsley | H | W | 3–0 | Eagles (2) 56', 66' pen., Iwelumo 82' | 14,428 | |
| 23 October 2010 | 7th | Reading | H | L | 0–4 | | 14,895 | |
| 30 October 2010 | 8th | Queens Park Rangers | A | D | 1–1 | Alexander 45' pen. | 15,620 | |
| 9 November 2010 | 9th | Doncaster Rovers | H | D | 1–1 | Cork 63' | 13,655 | |
| 13 November 2010 | 6th | Watford | H | W | 3–2 | Iwelumo 25', Wallace 70', Alexander 77' pen. | 14,160 | |
| 20 November 2010 | 10th | Coventry City | A | L | 0–1 | | 14,432 | |
| 27 November 2010 | 6th | Derby County | H | W | 2–1 | Mears 82', Cork 90' | 13,790 | |
| 11 December 2010 | 9th | Leeds United | H | L | 2–3 | Easton 29', Rodriguez 37' | 20,453 | |
| 26 December 2010 | 8th | Barnsley | A | W | 2–1 | Guidetti 49', Bikey 54' | 14,219 | |
| 28 December 2010 | 9th | Scunthorpe United | H | L | 0–2 | | 15,043 | |
| 1 January 2011 | 8th | Sheffield United | H | W | 4–2 | Eagles 29', Iwelumo 45', Rodriguez 45', Thompson 85' | 14,897 | |
| 3 January 2011 | 10th | Reading | A | L | 1–2 | Wallace 28' | 16,151 | |
| 15 January 2011 | 10th | Queens Park Rangers | H | D | 0–0 | | 14,819 | |
| 22 January 2011 | 11th | Scunthorpe United | A | D | 0–0 | | 4,334 | |
| 25 January 2011 | 9th | Portsmouth | A | W | 2–1 | Rodriguez 31', Marney 37' | 13,345 | |
| 1 February 2011 | 11th | Doncaster Rovers | A | L | 0–1 | | 8,893 | |
| 5 February 2011 | 10th | Norwich City | H | W | 2–1 | Marney 33', Rodriguez 81' | 14,859 | |
| 12 February 2011 | 8th | Watford | A | W | 3–1 | Bennett 8' o.g., Eagles 66', Iwelumo 75' | 13,103 | |
| 15 February 2011 | 8th | Cardiff City | A | D | 1–1 | Thompson 83' | 21,307 | |
| 26 February 2011 | 8th | Preston North End | A | W | 2–1 | Rodriguez 32', Cork 84' | 21,307 | |
| 5 March 2011 | 7th | Crystal Palace | H | W | 1–0 | Rodriguez 3' | 14,848 | |
| 8 March 2011 | 7th | Hull City | A | W | 1–0 | Delfouneso 5' | 20,218 | |
| 12 March 2011 | 7th | Millwall | H | L | 0–3 | | 14,589 | |
| 15 March 2011 | 7th | Coventry City | H | D | 2–2 | Rodriguez (2) 18', 79' | 13,802 | |
| 19 March 2011 | 8th | Bristol City | A | L | 0–2 | | 14,360 | |
| 2 April 2011 | 9th | Ipswich Town | H | L | 1–2 | Rodriguez 68' | 14,483 | |
| 9 April 2011 | 11th | Leicester City | A | L | 0–4 | | 24,039 | |
| 12 April 2011 | 12th | Nottingham Forest | A | L | 0–2 | | 19,411 | |
| 16 April 2011 | 11th | Swansea City | H | W | 2–1 | Williams 57' o.g., Eagles 77' pen. | 13,675 | |
| 19 April 2011 | 9th | Middlesbrough | H | W | 3–1 | Rodriguez 22', Elliott 23', Duff 37' | 14,366 | |
| 23 April 2011 | 8th | Derby County | A | W | 4–2 | Eagles (2) 15', 62', Elliott 65', McCann 74' | 25,187 | |
| 25 April 2011 | 8th | Portsmouth | H | D | 1–1 | Eagles 74' | 14,927 | |
| 30 April 2011 | 9th | Leeds United | A | L | 0–1 | | 31,186 | |
| 7 May 2011 | 8th | Cardiff City | H | D | 1–1 | Rodriguez 13' | 14,197 | |

=== FA Cup ===
FA Cup match details
| Round | Date | Opponents | Venue | Result | Score F–A | Scorers | Attendance | Ref |
|---|---|---|---|---|---|---|---|---|
| Third round | 8 January 2011 | Port Vale | H | W | 4–2 | Carlisle 4', Mears 21', Eagles 50', Alexander 76' pen. | 9,442 | |
| Fourth round | 29 January 2011 | Burton Albion | H | W | 3–1 | Eagles (2) 29', 70', Paterson 90' | 11,664 | |
| Fifth round | 21 February 2011 | West Ham United | A | L | 1–5 | Rodriguez 71' | 30,000 | |

=== Football League Cup ===
Football League Cup match details
| Round | Date | Opponents | Venue | Result | Score F–A | Scorers | Attendance | Ref |
|---|---|---|---|---|---|---|---|---|
| Second round | 24 August 2010 | Morecambe | A | W | 3–1 | Eagles 30', Thompson 61' pen., McDonald 83' | 5,003 | |
| Third round | 21 September 2010 | Bolton Wanderers | H | W | 1–0 | Elliott 45' | 17,602 | |
| Fourth round | 27 October 2011 | Aston Villa | A | L | 1–2 (a.e.t.) | Carlisle 88' | 34,618 | |

== Coaching staff ==
| Position | Name | Nationality |
|---|---|---|
| Manager: | Brian Laws | (England) English |
| Assistant manager: | Russ Wilcox | (England) English |
| First Team Coach: | Stuart Gray | (England) English |
| Youth Team Coach: | Terry Pashley | (England) English |
| Chief scout: | Tim Henderson | (England) English |
| Goalkeeping coach: | Billy Mercer | (England) English |
| Fitness Coach: | Tom Little | (England) English |

== Transfers ==
=== In ===
| # | Pos | Player | From | Fee | Date |
|---|---|---|---|---|---|
| 8 | MF | (England) Dean Marney | Hull City | Undisclosed | 28 May 2010 |
| 9 | FW | (Scotland) Chris Iwelumo | Wolverhampton Wanderers | Undisclosed | 1 June 2010 |
| 22 | MF | (Scotland) Ross Wallace | Preston North End | Undisclosed | 2 July 2010 |
| 1 | GK | (England) Lee Grant | Sheffield Wednesday | Undisclosed | 27 July 2010 |
| 6 | MF | (England) Jack Cork | Chelsea | Loan | 12 August 2010 |
| 20 | FW | (Sweden) John Guidetti | Manchester City | Loan | 25 November 2010 |
| 23 | FW | (England) Charlie Austin | Swindon Town | Undisclosed | 28 January 2011 |
| 20 | MF | (England) Marvin Bartley | Bournemouth | Undisclosed | 31 January 2011 |
| 26 | FW | (England) Nathan Delfouneso | Aston Villa | Loan | 8 March 2011 |
| 25 | DF | (Republic of Ireland) Shane Duffy | Everton | Loan | 24 March 2011 |

=== Out ===
| # | Pos | Player | To | Fee | Date |
|---|---|---|---|---|---|
| | DF | (Scotland) Steven Caldwell | Wigan Athletic | Free | 11 May 2010 |
| | DF | (England) Stephen Jordan | Sheffield United | Released | 11 May 2010 |
| | MF | (England) Adam Kay | Stalybridge Celtic | Released | 11 May 2010 |
| | GK | (England) Jonathan Lund | | Released | 11 May 2010 |
| | FW | (Scotland) Steven Fletcher | Wolverhampton Wanderers | £6,500,000 | 3 June 2010 |
| | GK | (England) Nicky Weaver | Sheffield Wednesday | Free | 1 August 2010 |
| 31 | GK | (Peru) Diego Penny | | Released | 16 August 2010 |
| 7 | MF | (Scotland) Kevin McDonald | Scunthorpe United | Loan | 14 October 2010 |
| 28 | DF | (Republic of Ireland) Kevin Long | Accrington Stanley | Loan | 15 October 2010 |
| 39 | FW | (England) Wes Fletcher | Stockport County | Loan | 15 October 2010 |
| 17 | DF | (England) Richard Eckersley | Bradford City | Loan | 13 November 2010 |
| 18 | DF | (England) Leon Cort | Preston North End | Loan | 25 November 2010 |
| 27 | FW | (Scotland) Alex MacDonald | Inverness Caledonian Thistle | Loan | 28 January 2011 |
| 28 | DF | (Republic of Ireland) Kevin Long | Accrington Stanley | Loan | 31 January 2011 |
| 7 | MF | (Scotland) Kevin McDonald | Notts County | Loan | 11 February 2011 |
| 17 | DF | (England) Richard Eckersley | Bury | Loan | 14 March 2011 |
| 38 | MF | (England) Alex-Ray Harvey | Fleetwood Town | Loan | 18 March 2011 |
| 17 | DF | (England) Richard Eckersley | Toronto | Loan | 15 April 2011 |

== Appearances and goals ==
Numbers in parentheses denote appearances as substitute.
Players with names struck through and marked † left the club during the playing season.
Players with names in italics and marked * were on loan from another club for the whole of their season with Burnley.
Players listed with no appearances have been in the matchday squad but only as unused substitutes.
Key to positions: GK – Goalkeeper; DF – Defender; MF – Midfielder; FW – Forward

| No. | Pos. | Nat. | Name | League | | FA Cup | | League Cup | | Total | | Discipline | |
| No. | Pos. | Nat. | Name | Apps | Goals | Apps | Goals | Apps | Goals | Apps | Goals | A yellow rectangle, denoting the yellow penalty card shown to a player being cautioned | A red rectangle, denoting the red penalty card shown to a player being sent off |
|---|---|---|---|---|---|---|---|---|---|---|---|---|---|
| 1 | GK | ENG | Lee Grant | 25 | 0 | 3 | 0 | 3 | 0 | 31 | 0 | 0 | 0 |
| 2 | MF | SCO | Graham Alexander | 15 (17) | 3 | 1 (1) | 1 | 2 | 0 | 18 (18) | 4 | 2 | 0 |
| 3 | DF | SCO | Danny Fox | 35 | 0 | 3 | 0 | 2 | 0 | 40 | 0 | 12 | 0 |
| 4 | DF | NIR | Michael Duff | 27 (1) | 1 | 3 | 0 | 1 | 0 | 31 (1) | 1 | 8 | 0 |
| 5 | DF | ENG | Clarke Carlisle | 33 (2) | 1 | 3 | 1 | 3 | 1 | 39 (2) | 3 | 6 | 1 |
| 6 | MF | ENG | Jack Cork * | 36 (4) | 3 | 3 | 0 | 3 | 0 | 42 (4) | 3 | 5 | 0 |
| 7 | MF | SCO | Kevin McDonald | 0 | 0 | 0 | 0 | 0 (1) | 1 | 0 (1) | 1 | 0 | 0 |
| 8 | MF | ENG | Dean Marney | 34 (2) | 3 | 2 (1) | 0 | 1 (1) | 0 | 37 (4) | 3 | 6 | 0 |
| 9 | FW | SCO | Chris Iwelumo | 29 (16) | 11 | 1 (2) | 0 | 1 (1) | 0 | 31 (19) | 11 | 1 | 0 |
| 10 | FW | NIR | Martin Paterson | 7 (4) | 2 | 0 (1) | 1 | 1 (1) | 0 | 8 (6) | 3 | 0 | 0 |
| 11 | MF | ENG | Wade Elliott | 37 (7) | 2 | 3 | 0 | 2 (1) | 1 | 42 (8) | 3 | 6 | 0 |
| 12 | GK | DEN | Brian Jensen | 21 | 0 | 0 | 0 | 0 | 0 | 21 | 0 | 0 | 0 |
| 14 | DF | JAM | Tyrone Mears | 44 | 1 | 3 | 1 | 2 | 0 | 49 | 2 | 10 | 1 |
| 15 | DF | CAN | David Edgar | 3 (4) | 0 | 0 | 0 | 1 | 0 | 4 (4) | 0 | 2 | 1 |
| 16 | MF | IRL | Chris McCann | 4 | 1 | 0 | 0 | 0 | 0 | 4 | 1 | 1 | 0 |
| 17 | DF | ENG | Richard Eckersley | 0 | 0 | 0 | 0 | 1 | 0 | 1 | 0 | 1 | 0 |
| 18 | DF | GUY | Leon Cort | 3 (1) | 0 | 0 | 0 | 1 | 0 | 4 (1) | 0 | 1 | 1 |
| 19 | FW | ENG | Jay Rodriguez | 37 (5) | 14 | 3 | 1 | 3 | 0 | 43 (5) | 15 | 8 | 0 |
| 20 | FW | SWE | ~~John Guidetti *~~ † | 2 (3) | 1 | 0 | 0 | 0 | 0 | 2 (3) | 1 | 0 | 0 |
| 20 | MF | ENG | Marvin Bartley | 3 (2) | 0 | 0 | 0 | 0 | 0 | 3 (2) | 0 | 0 | 1 |
| 21 | DF | CMR | André Bikey | 27 (1) | 2 | 0 (1) | 0 | 1 | 0 | 28 (2) | 2 | 7 | 0 |
| 22 | MF | SCO | Ross Wallace | 24 (16) | 3 | 1 (1) | 0 | 1 | 0 | 26 (17) | 3 | 4 | 0 |
| 23 | FW | ENG | Charlie Austin | 2 (2) | 0 | 0 | 0 | 0 | 0 | 2 (2) | 0 | 0 | 0 |
| 24 | DF | SCO | Brian Easton | 11 (1) | 1 | 0 | 0 | 1 | 0 | 12 (1) | 1 | 0 | 0 |
| 25 | DF | IRL | ~~Shane Duffy *~~ † | 1 | 0 | 0 | 0 | 0 | 0 | 1 | 0 | 0 | 0 |
| 26 | FW | ENG | ~~Nathan Delfouneso *~~ † | 7 (4) | 1 | 0 | 0 | 0 | 0 | 7 (4) | 1 | 1 | 0 |
| 27 | FW | SCO | Alex MacDonald | 0 | 0 | 0 | 0 | 0 | 0 | 0 | 0 | 0 | 0 |
| 28 | DF | IRL | Kevin Long | 0 | 0 | 0 | 0 | 0 | 0 | 0 | 0 | 0 | 0 |
| 30 | FW | SCO | Steven Thompson | 2 (27) | 2 | 1 (2) | 0 | 1 (2) | 1 | 4 (31) | 3 | 5 | 0 |
| 31 | GK | PER | Diego Penny | 0 | 0 | 0 | 0 | 0 | 0 | 0 | 0 | 0 | 0 |
| 33 | MF | ENG | Chris Eagles | 37 (6) | 11 | 3 | 3 | 2 | 1 | 42 (6) | 15 | 3 | 0 |
| 35 | DF | ENG | Chris Lynch | 0 | 0 | 0 | 0 | 0 | 0 | 0 | 0 | 0 | 0 |
| 36 | DF | ENG | Nik Kudiersky | 0 | 0 | 0 | 0 | 0 | 0 | 0 | 0 | 0 | 0 |
| 37 | MF | ENG | Chris Anderson | 0 | 0 | 0 | 0 | 0 | 0 | 0 | 0 | 0 | 0 |
| 38 | MF | ENG | Alex-Ray Harvey | 0 | 0 | 0 | 0 | 0 | 0 | 0 | 0 | 0 | 0 |
| 39 | FW | ENG | Wes Fletcher | 0 | 0 | 0 | 0 | 0 (1) | 0 | 0 (1) | 0 | 0 | 0 |
| 42 | GK | ENG | Josh Cook | 0 | 0 | 0 | 0 | 0 | 0 | 0 | 0 | 0 | 0 |
| 43 | FW | ENG | Dominic Knowles | 0 | 0 | 0 | 0 | 0 | 0 | 0 | 0 | 0 | 0 |
| 44 | MF | ENG | Michael King | 0 | 0 | 0 | 0 | 0 (1) | 0 | 0 (1) | 0 | 0 | 0 |
