= David Marshall (Scottish footballer) =

Scottish footballer (born 1985)

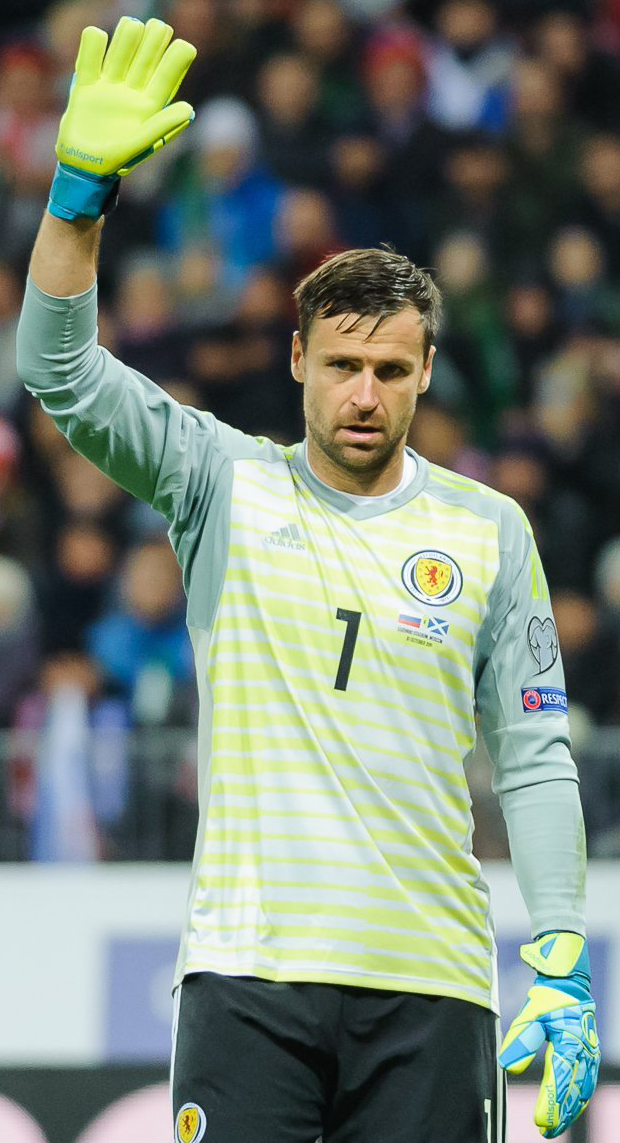
- Marshall playing for Scotland in 2019

Personal information
- Full name: David James Marshall
- Date of birth: 5 March 1985 (age 41)
- Place of birth: Glasgow, Scotland
- Height: 6 ft 3 in (1.91 m)
- Position: Goalkeeper

Team information
- Current team: Hibernian (Technical performance director)

Youth career
- –2002: Celtic

Senior career*
Years	Team	Apps	(Gls)
2002–2007	Celtic	35	(0)
2007	→ Norwich City (loan)	2	(0)
2007–2009	Norwich City	92	(0)
2009–2016	Cardiff City	264	(0)
2016–2019	Hull City	61	(0)
2019–2020	Wigan Athletic	39	(0)
2020–2022	Derby County	33	(0)
2022	Queens Park Rangers	11	(0)
2022–2024	Hibernian	71	(0)
Total		608	(0)

International career
2005–2006	Scotland U21	4	(0)
2009	Scotland B	1	(0)
2004–2021	Scotland	47	(0)
- * Club domestic league appearances and goals as of 05:06, 16 May 2024 (UTC)

David James Marshall (born 5 March 1985) is a Scottish former professional footballer who played as a goalkeeper.

Marshall started his career at Celtic, where he came through the youth system and starred in a European victory against Barcelona. After losing his place at Celtic to Artur Boruc, Marshall moved to Norwich City (initially on loan) in 2007. He moved to Cardiff City in 2009, and helped them win promotion to the Premier League in 2013. Marshall stayed with Cardiff until 2016, when he was transferred to Hull City for £5 million. After three seasons with Hull, he played for Wigan Athletic, Derby County, Queens Park Rangers and Hibernian before retiring in 2024.

Marshall made his full international debut for Scotland in 2004. He went on to win 47 caps, despite having had to compete with Craig Gordon and Allan McGregor for the goalkeeping position in the national team for much of his career. Marshall played a key role in Scotland's qualification for UEFA Euro 2020, as he made decisive saves in penalty shootouts against Israel and Serbia.

== Club career ==
=== Celtic ===
Marshall was born in Glasgow and raised in Riddrie in the east end of the city, where he attended St Andrew's Secondary School. A supporter of Celtic in childhood and a product of their youth academy, he made his first team debut for the club in February 2003 as a substitute for Javier Sánchez Broto in the Scottish Cup against St Johnstone at Celtic Park, and was an unused substitute in the 2003 Scottish League Cup final a month later. Although first-team opportunities were limited, he excelled in Celtic's reserve team under the management of then coach, Kenny McDowall.

Marshall was thrust into the limelight soon after these impressive displays for Celtic reserves in March 2004 in a UEFA Cup fourth-round tie against Spanish giants FC Barcelona. In the first leg at Celtic Park, starting goalkeeper Rab Douglas was sent off at half-time, and 19-year-old Marshall came on in his place as Celtic won 1–0. With Douglas suspended, Marshall played from the start at the Camp Nou in the second leg two weeks later and put in an excellent performance, to secure a goalless draw that put Celtic into the next round 1–0 on aggregate. He went on to save a penalty from Barcelona star Ronaldinho during a Champions League match in the following season.

His Celtic career took a downward turn under the management of Gordon Strachan. In the first two games under Strachan he conceded nine goals: five to Artmedia Bratislava and four to Motherwell. With the signing of Artur Boruc, Marshall was consigned to the bench and remained there for the following 18 months before being sent on loan to Norwich City. In July 2007, Celtic agreed to transfer Marshall to Norwich permanently for an undisclosed fee.

=== Norwich City ===
Marshall signed on loan for Norwich in January 2007. He made his Norwich debut was against Blackpool, but was sidelined for the remainder of the 2006–07 season due to an injury sustained in a FA Cup fourth round tie with Chelsea in February after falling awkwardly on his ankle, and returned to Celtic.

On 4 July 2007, Marshall signed a three-year contract with Norwich. Marshall impressed in his pre-season appearances for the club, performing well against Vitesse Arnhem and West Ham United in particular.

Before Norwich's last home game of the 2007–08 season against Queens Park Rangers at Carrow Road, Marshall came third in the voting for Norwich City player of the year after a string of impressive displays. He was the only member of the squad to have played every minute of every game in the season.

=== Cardiff City ===
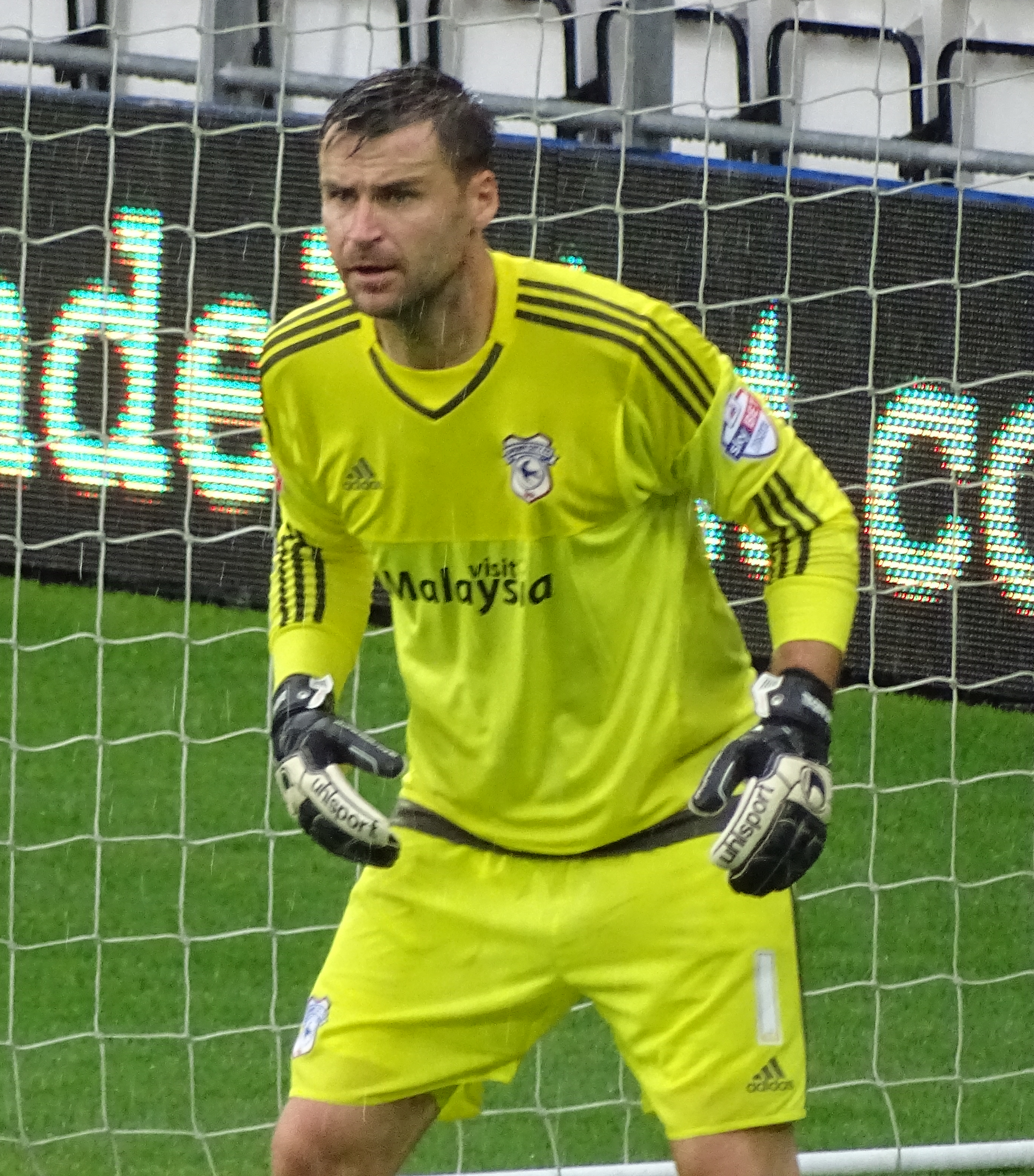
Marshall playing for Cardiff City in 2015

On 12 May 2009, following Norwich's relegation, Marshall signed for Championship side Cardiff City in a deal worth up to £500,000. He was chosen as the first choice goalkeeper over Finland international Peter Enckelman by manager Dave Jones, making his debut on the opening day of the season in a 4–0 win over Scunthorpe United before conceding his first goal in a 1–1 draw with Blackpool in the following match. Marshall let in three goals in his first South Wales Derby where City went on to lose 3–2 to Swansea City at the Liberty Stadium. Marshall suffered an injury in a 2–1 loss against Ipswich Town, resulting in Peter Enckelman coming on for the last 45 minutes and two goals being scored. Marshall did recover in time for the next game, were Cardiff beat Preston North End 1–0. After his quick return Marshall kept three consecutive clean sheets the other two coming against West Bromwich Albion and Middlesbrough and also making 150th league appearance against Middlesbrough.

Marshall retained his first team place for the first two months of the following season, before being dropped for second choice keeper, Tom Heaton after a 2–0 defeat to Ipswich Town. Marshall didn't see first team football until the beginning of December in a 1–1 draw with Preston North End but only managed to start the next four games before being injured. But he managed to make his final appearance of the 2010–11 season in a FA Cup game against Stoke City before receiving an elbow injury which ended his season, after it was confirmed he needed elbow surgery.

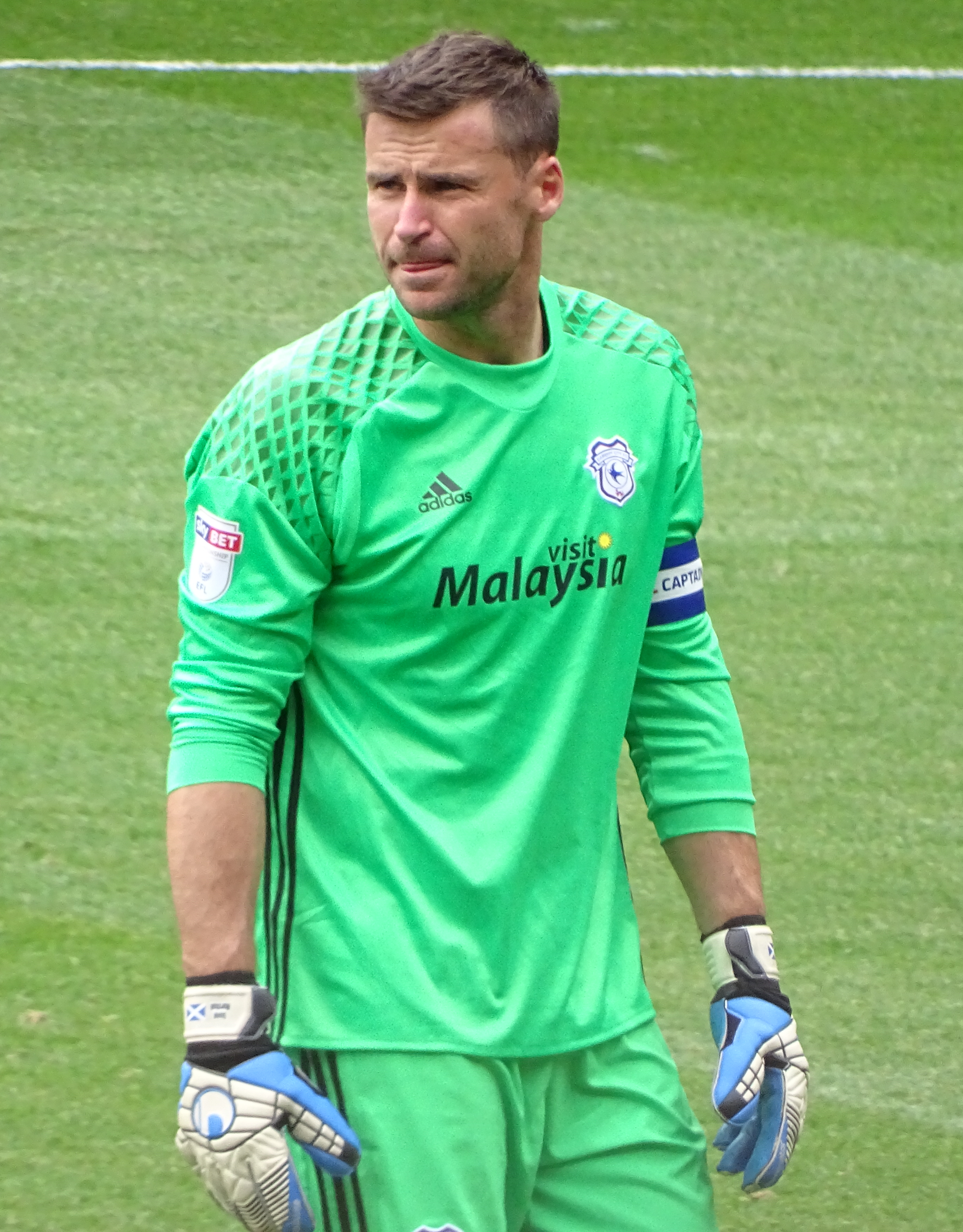
Marshall playing for Cardiff City in 2016

Marshall returned the following pre-season as first-choice goalkeeper, starting all the warm-up games under new manager and fellow Scotsman, Malky Mackay. He made his full return in the opening game against West Ham United, which Cardiff won 1–0. He made his 100th appearance for the club during the season in a goalless draw with Burnley. Cardiff finished in the play-off a third successive season but lost 5–0 to West Ham United in the semi-finals. At the end of the season, Marshall was out of contract but on 23 May, he signed a new three-year deal keeping him in Cardiff till 2015.

Marshall made his one hundredth league appearance for Cardiff City on 17 August 2012, the opening day of the 2012–13 season against Huddersfield Town, a game in which he also won man of the match. With manager Malky Mackay describing Marshall as the best goalkeeper in the Football League, the shot-stopper kept eighteen clean sheets in the 2012–13 season, more than any other Championship goalkeeper, and was a strong contender for City's Player of The Season Award as the Welsh club achieved promotion to the Premier League.

During Cardiff's one-year stint in the top division, Marshall earned a number of plaudits following some impressive performances. His performances earned him a new four-year contract, keeping him at Cardiff until 2018. He was named in the Sky Sports Premier League team of the year by Gary Neville and Jamie Carragher and was awarded the club's Player of the Year award. In July 2014 manager Ole Gunnar Solskjær claimed that Marshall had been the best keeper in the Premier League of the 2013–14 season.

Following the sale of club captain, Mark Hudson, in September 2014, Marshall was given club captaincy.

In the final game of the 2014–15 season against Nottingham Forest, Marshall was sent off for violent conduct, meaning he would miss the first three games of the following season.

Cardiff manager Russell Slade admitted he was unsure whether Marshall would retain the captaincy for the season, if Cardiff got off to a good start. Marshall was subject to a £4.5 million from West Bromwich Albion, which was rebuffed by Cardiff and the club stated the player was not for sale. He received another red card after lashing out at Rotherham United's Matt Derbyshire after he was pulled by the striker, which left Cardiff a goal down, following Vadis Odjidja-Ofoe's penalty. During the January transfer window, Cardiff placed a £10 million valuation on Marshall following attention from Premier League clubs. Despite pushing for the play-offs for the majority of the season, Cardiff missed out after losing at Sheffield Wednesday.

=== Hull City ===
In August 2016, Cardiff accepted a bid for Marshall worth up to £5 million, including add-ons, from newly promoted Premier League side Hull City. On 30 August, Marshall completed a move to the Tigers for an undisclosed fee. He made his debut on 21 September 2016 in the League Cup in a 2–1 away win against Stoke City. Hull were relegated to the Championship at the end of the 2016–17 season. Marshall left Hull in June 2019, at the end of his contract.

=== Wigan Athletic ===
Marshall signed a two-year contract with Wigan Athletic in July 2019. He made 38 appearances in his debut season and kept 15 clean sheets, including a fine run of seven in a row either side of the break in the season due to the COVID-19 pandemic.

=== Derby County ===
On 21 August 2020, he joined Derby County. After Wayne Rooney became manager, Marshall was named captain.

Early in the 2021–22 season, Rooney demoted Marshall to third-choice. "At the minute, Ryan and Kelle are the two who will be involved," said Rooney. "The goalkeeping position is a difficult one, only one can play, so you have to make decisions on that. Marshy will have to be ready in case anything happens and when he gets the chance, take it."

=== Queens Park Rangers ===
On 11 January 2022, Marshall joined Queens Park Rangers on a deal until the end of the season. His season was ended by a hamstring injury in March 2022, and he left QPR at the end of his contract.

=== Hibernian ===
Marshall signed a two-year contract with Scottish club Hibernian in May 2022, which commenced on 1 July. He saved two penalty kicks in the space of a minute during a game with Livingston on 24 December.

Marshall retired from playing in June 2024.

== International career ==
After his standout performance for Celtic against Barcelona in the 2003–04 UEFA Cup, Marshall was selected by Scotland national football team. He made his full international debut on 18 August 2004 in a friendly against Hungary. Some observers expected Marshall to establish himself as the first choice goalkeeper for Scotland, but Craig Gordon and then Allan McGregor were picked more regularly instead.

Unusually, his first appearance for the under-21 team came after his first appearance at full level. He played four times for the under-21s between 2005 and 2006, and he was selected for a Scotland B match at the end of the 2008–09 season.

Marshall stated in May 2009 that he aimed to reignite his career for the national team. With first choice keeper Craig Gordon injured, he went on to play in two of Scotland's following three matches, a 4–0 defeat to Norway and a 1–0 defeat to Netherlands. Marshall performed creditably against the Dutch, but Scotland had lost in all of his five appearances to date, conceding 15 goals in total.

An injury to McGregor, and Gordon being without a club, appeared to have offered an opportunity for Marshall early in the 2012–13 season, but Matt Gilks played instead. Marshall was part of a winning Scottish side on his eighth cap against Macedonia with Scotland winning 2–1, However, he was injured during the game and was replaced by Gilks at half time. Marshall won his tenth cap on 19 November 2013 in a friendly away against Norway, keeping a clean sheet and producing several good saves in a 1–0 win for Scotland.

Marshall was first choice during UEFA Euro 2016 qualifying, but was dropped after a 3–0 defeat to Slovakia in October 2016. Steve Clarke recalled him in June 2019, when he played in the Euro 2020 qualifiers against Cyprus and Belgium. Marshall saved an effort from Eran Zahavi during a penalty shootout against Israel in October 2020, which helped Scotland progress in the Euro 2020 qualifying play-offs. He then saved the decisive penalty in another shootout in the play-off final against Serbia, which qualified Scotland for their first major tournament in 22 years. His appearance in those matches also set a record for the longest-spanning international career for a Scottish player (16 years 2 months and 26 days), exceeding a record set by 19th-century goalkeeper Ned Doig (Jim Leighton's time ended within two months of Doig's mark); however, Marshall was soon overtaken by Craig Gordon.

Marshall played in all of Scotland's three matches at the Euro 2020 finals. His positioning for a long-range goal by Czech Republic forward Patrik Schick, which was later voted goal of the tournament, was criticised by some observers.

Following the loss of his first-team place at Derby County, Marshall was dropped from the Scotland squad for World Cup qualifiers in September 2021. Marshall was recalled to the squad in March 2022, but had to withdraw due to injury. He was again called into the squad in June 2022, but retired from international football following the team's play-off defeat by Ukraine.

== Career statistics ==
=== Club ===
Appearances and goals by club, season and competition
Club	Season	League			National cup		League cup		Europe		Other		Total	
Club	Season	Division	Apps	Goals	Apps	Goals	Apps	Goals	Apps	Goals	Apps	Goals	Apps	Goals
Celtic	2002–03	Scottish Premier League	0	0	1	0	0	0	0	0	—		1	0
Celtic	2003–04	Scottish Premier League	11	0	2	0	1	0	4	0	—		18	0
Celtic	2004–05	Scottish Premier League	18	0	1	0	1	0	4	0	—		24	0
Celtic	2005–06	Scottish Premier League	4	0	0	0	0	0	1	0	—		5	0
Celtic	2006–07	Scottish Premier League	2	0	0	0	0	0	0	0	—		2	0
Celtic	Total		35	0	4	0	2	0	9	0	—		50	0
Norwich City	2006–07	Championship	2	0	3	0	0	0	—		—		5	0
Norwich City	2007–08	Championship	46	0	2	0	3	0	—		—		51	0
Norwich City	2008–09	Championship	46	0	2	0	1	0	—		—		49	0
Norwich City	Total		94	0	7	0	4	0	—		—		105	0
Cardiff City	2009–10	Championship	43	0	4	0	0	0	—		3	0	50	0
Cardiff City	2010–11	Championship	11	0	1	0	0	0	—		0	0	12	0
Cardiff City	2011–12	Championship	45	0	0	0	1	0	—		2	0	48	0
Cardiff City	2012–13	Championship	46	0	0	0	0	0	—		0	0	46	0
Cardiff City	2013–14	Premier League	37	0	3	0	0	0	—		—		40	0
Cardiff City	2014–15	Championship	38	0	0	0	0	0	—		—		38	0
Cardiff City	2015–16	Championship	40	0	0	0	0	0	—		—		40	0
Cardiff City	2016–17	Championship	4	0	0	0	0	0	—		—		4	0
Cardiff City	Total		264	0	8	0	1	0	—		5	0	278	0
Hull City	2016–17	Premier League	16	0	0	0	2	0	—		0	0	18	0
Hull City	2017–18	Championship	2	0	3	0	0	0	—		—		5	0
Hull City	2018–19	Championship	43	0	0	0	1	0	—		—		44	0
Hull City	Total		61	0	3	0	3	0	—		0	0	67	0
Wigan Athletic	2019–20	Championship	39	0	1	0	0	0	—		—		40	0
Derby County	2020–21	Championship	33	0	0	0	0	0	—		—		33	0
Derby County	2021–22	Championship	0	0	0	0	0	0	—		—		0	0
Derby County	Total		33	0	0	0	0	0	—		—		33	0
Queens Park Rangers	2021–22	Championship	11	0	1	0	0	0	—		—		12	0
Hibernian	2022–23	Scottish Premiership	38	0	1	0	3	0	—		—		42	0
Hibernian	2023–24	Scottish Premiership	33	0	3	0	3	0	5	0	—		44	0
Hibernian	Total		71	0	4	0	6	0	5	0	—		86	0
Career total			608	0	28	0	16	0	14	0	5	0	671	0

=== International ===
Appearances and goals by national team and year
National team	Year	Apps	Goals
Scotland U-21	2005	2	0
Scotland U-21	2006	2	0
Total		4	0
Scotland B	2009	1	0
Total		1	0
Scotland	2004	2	0
Scotland	2005	—	
Scotland	2006	—	
Scotland	2007	—	
Scotland	2008	—	
Scotland	2009	3	0
Scotland	2010	—	
Scotland	2011	—	
Scotland	2012	—	
Scotland	2013	5	0
Scotland	2014	6	0
Scotland	2015	6	0
Scotland	2016	5	0
Scotland	2017	—	
Scotland	2018	—	
Scotland	2019	7	0
Scotland	2020	7	0
Scotland	2021	6	0
Total		47	0

== Honours ==
Celtic

- Scottish Premier League: 2003–04
- Scottish Cup: 2003–04, 2004–05
- Scottish League Cup: 2005–06

Cardiff City

- Football League Championship: 2012–13
- Football League Cup runner-up: 2011–12

Individual

- Cardiff City Player of the Year: 2013–14
