= ChampionsWorld Series =

Club Association football exhibition competition

The ChampionsWorld Series was a club association football exhibition competition hosted in North America, held in the summers of 2003 and 2004.

The entire 2003 competition took place in the United States, with the match between Milan and Juventus doubling up as the 2003 Supercoppa Italiana. The 2004 edition had two games held in Canada.

== 2003 edition ==
=== Teams ===
Country	Team	Current titles
Argentina	Boca Juniors	2003 Copa Libertadores
England	Manchester United	2002–03 FA Premier League
Italy	Juventus	2002–03 Serie A
Italy	Milan	2002–03 UEFA Champions League • 2002–03 Coppa Italia
Mexico	América	
Scotland	Celtic	
Spain	Barcelona	

=== Matches ===
July 22, 2003

Manchester United (England)	4–0	(Scotland) Celtic
Van Nistelrooy 7'; Giggs 28'; Solskjær 39'; Bellion 72'	Report

Seahawks Stadium, Seattle, Washington
Attendance: 66,772
Referee: Kevin Terry

July 25, 2003

Celtic (Scotland)	1–0	(Argentina) Boca Juniors
Sutton 59'	Report

Cleveland Browns Stadium, Cleveland, Ohio
Attendance: 20,842
Referee: Ricardo Valenzuela

July 27, 2003

Manchester United (England)	3–1	(Mexico) América
Van Nistelrooy 47'; Forlán 49', 79'	Report	Patiño 87'

Los Angeles Memorial Coliseum, Los Angeles, California
Attendance: 57,365
Referee: Ali Saheli

July 27, 2003

Barcelona (Spain)	2–2	(Italy) Juventus
Saviola 28', 41'	Report	Di Vaio 86'; Miccoli 87'
Penalties
	6–5

Gillette Stadium, Foxborough, Massachusetts
Attendance: 57,365
Referee: Kevin Terry

July 30, 2003

Barcelona (Spain)	2–0	(Italy) Milan
Quaresma 11'; Ronaldinho 51'	Report

Robert F. Kennedy Memorial Stadium, Washington, D.C.
Attendance: 45,864
Referee: Kevin Terry

July 31, 2003

Manchester United (England)	4–1	(Italy) Juventus
Giggs 24'; Scholes 57'; Van Nistelrooy 60'; Solskjær 79'	Report	Nedvěd 70'

Giants Stadium, East Rutherford, New Jersey
Attendance: 79,005
Referee: Brian Hall

August 3, 2003

Manchester United (England)	3–1	(Spain) Barcelona
Forlán 25', 37'; Van Nistelrooy 85'	Report	Kluivert 10'

Lincoln Financial Field, Philadelphia, Pennsylvania
Attendance: 68,396
Referee: Kevin Stott

August 3, 2003

Milan (Italy)	1–1 (a.e.t.)	(Italy) Juventus
Pirlo 105+2' (pen.)	Report	Trezeguet 105+3'
Penalties
Pirlo (penalty scored); Serginho (penalty scored); Brocchi (penalty missed); Nesta (penalty scored)	3–5	(penalty scored) Di Vaio; (penalty scored) Trezeguet; (penalty scored) Birindelli; (penalty scored) Camoranesi; (penalty scored) Ferrara

Giants Stadium, East Rutherford, New Jersey
Attendance: 54,128
Referee: Pierluigi Collina

== 2004 edition ==
=== Teams ===
Country	Team	Current titles
England	Chelsea	
England	Liverpool	
England	Manchester United	2003–04 FA Cup
Germany	Bayern Munich	
Italy	Milan	2003–04 Serie A
Italy	Roma	
Portugal	Porto	2003–04 UEFA Champions League • 2003–04 Primeira Liga
Scotland	Celtic	2003–04 Scottish Premier League • 2003–04 Scottish Cup
Turkey	Galatasaray	

=== Matches ===
July 24, 2004

Celtic (Scotland)	2–4	(England) Chelsea
Beattie 27', 68'	Report	Smertin 15'; Guðjohnsen 50'; Kežman 59', 87'

Qwest Field, Seattle, Washington
Attendance: 30,504
Referee: Kevin Terry

July 25, 2004

Manchester United (England)	0–0	(Germany) Bayern Munich
	Report
Penalties
Smith (penalty missed); Bellion (penalty scored); Keane (penalty scored); O'Shea (penalty missed)	2–4	(penalty scored) Frings; (penalty scored) Scholl; (penalty scored) Ballack; (penalty scored) Santa Cruz

Soldier Field, Chicago, Illinois
Attendance: 54,128
Referee: Terry Vaughn

July 26, 2004

Celtic (Scotland)	1–5	(England) Liverpool
Beattie 72' (pen.)	Report	Riise 5'; Owen 17'; Cissé 62', 76'; Henchoz 67'

Rentschler Field, East Hartford, Connecticut
Attendance: 24,271
Referee: Alex Prus

July 28, 2004

Manchester United (England)	1–2	(Scotland) Celtic
Smith 35'	Report	Sutton 9' (pen.); Beattie 71'

Lincoln Financial Field, Philadelphia, Pennsylvania
Attendance: 55,421
Referee: Kevin Stott

July 29, 2004

Chelsea (England)	3–0	(Italy) Roma
Cole 11'; Kežman 63'; Drogba 69'	Report

Heinz Field, Pittsburgh, Pennsylvania
Attendance: 25,317
Referee: Ricardo Valenzuela

July 30, 2004

Porto (Portugal)	1–0	(England) Liverpool
Carlos Alberto 84'	Report

SkyDome, Toronto, Ontario
Attendance: 40,078
Referee: Silviu Petrescu

July 31, 2004

Celtic (Scotland)	0–1	(Italy) Roma
	Report	Totti 25'

SkyDome, Toronto, Ontario
Attendance: 50,168
Referee: Steve DePiero

July 31, 2004

Manchester United (England)	1–1	(Italy) Milan
Scholes 33'	Report	Shevchenko 90'
Penalties
Forlán (penalty scored); Keane (penalty missed); Smith (penalty scored); G. Neville (penalty scored); Eagles (penalty scored); Brown (penalty scored); Richardson (penalty scored); Bardsley (penalty scored); Djemba-Djemba (penalty scored); Howard (penalty missed)	8–9	(penalty scored) Shevchenko; (penalty missed) Crespo; (penalty scored) Serginho; (penalty scored) Kaká; (penalty scored) Costacurta; (penalty scored) Brocchi; (penalty scored) Cafu; (penalty scored) Dida; (penalty scored) Kaladze; (penalty scored) Maldini

Giants Stadium, East Rutherford, New Jersey
Attendance: 74,511
Referee: Kevin Stott

August 1, 2004

Porto (Portugal)	1–2	(Turkey) Galatasaray
Maniche 90+3'	Report	Şükür 4'; Erdem 86'

Giants Stadium, East Rutherford, New Jersey
Attendance: 15,408
Referee: Kevin Terry

August 2, 2004

Milan (Italy)	3–2	(England) Chelsea
Cafu 26'; Costacurta 76'; Shevchenko 87'	Report	Guðjohnsen 19'; Drogba 38'

Lincoln Financial Field, Philadelphia, Pennsylvania
Attendance: 39,123
Referee: Terry Vaughn

August 3, 2004

Roma (Italy)	1–2	(England) Liverpool
Delvecchio 21'	Report	Cissé 30'; Owen 85'

Giants Stadium, East Rutherford, New Jersey
Attendance: 25,028
Referee: Michael Kennedy

== Notes ==
1. For the ChampionsWorld Series game, Milan were listed first. For the Supercoppa Italiana fixture, Juventus were listed first.
