= 2005 Scottish Cup final =

2005 Scottish Cup Final
- Event: 2004–05 Scottish Cup
Celtic	Dundee United
1	0
- Date: 28 May 2005
- Venue: Hampden Park, Glasgow
- Man of the Match: Craig Bellamy
- Referee: John Rowbotham
- Attendance: 50,635

The 2005 Scottish Cup Final was played on 28 May 2005 at Hampden Park in Glasgow and was the final of the 120th Scottish Cup. The final was contested by Celtic and Dundee United. Celtic won the match with an eleventh-minute goal from Alan Thompson.

== Background ==
Dundee United had had a difficult season and had dismissed manager Ian McCall in March with the club facing being relegated from the Scottish Premier League, appointing his assistant Gordon Chisholm as his replacement, initially on an interim basis. A week before the Scottish Cup final United went into their final league match against Inverness Caledonian Thistle knowing they needed a point to ensure they avoided relegation. Ultimately they avoided this fate, beating Inverness 1–0, while city rivals Dundee lost their match and were relegated.

By contrast Celtic had gone into the final day of the league season as league leaders. With minutes to go Celtic looked set to be champions as they were leading Motherwell 1–0. However two late goals by Motherwell's Scott McDonald led to defeat for Celtic, which meant their arch-rivals Rangers emerged as champions. The final would be the last match in charge of Celtic for manager Martin O'Neill who had announced he would be leaving the club at the end of the season.

== Road to the final ==
Celtic				Round	Dundee United			
Home team	Score	Away team	Celtic scorer(s)	Round	Home team	Score	Away team	Dundee United scorer(s)
Celtic	2–1	Rangers	Sutton 37'; Hartson 77'	Round Three	Gretna	3–4	Dundee United	Robson 4'; Kerr 7'; Wilson 21' (pen.); Crawford 56'
Dunfermline Athletic	0–3	Celtic	Hartson 8', 43'; Sutton 10'	Round Four	Queen of the South	0–3	Dundee United	McIntyre 13'; Wilson 24', 39'
Clyde	0–5	Celtic	Varga 40', 68'; Thompson 48' (pen.); Petrov 60'; Bellamy 72'	Quarter-finals	Dundee United	4–1	Aberdeen	Archibald 19'; Grady 29', 47'; Crawford 41'
Hearts	1–2	Celtic	Sutton 3'; Bellamy 49'	Semi-finals	Dundee United	2–1	Hibernian	McIntyre 73'; Scotland 76'

== Match ==
=== Summary ===
The match was decided after 11 minutes when Alan Thompson scored the only goal of the game from a free-kick which deflected off United defender Garry Kenneth. United had a chance to equalise shortly afterwards when a Jason Scotland cross was narrowly missed by Stevie Crawford. Thereafter Celtic dominated much of the match, but failed to add to their total. Celtic's best chance came when they were awarded a penalty, but Chris Sutton put the spot-kick over the bar. At the very end of the match United's Alan Archibald came close to equalising when his long range strike beat Celtic goalkeeper Rab Douglas, but it rebounded off the crossbar and shortly afterwards the final whistle was blown.

=== Match details ===
28 May 2005
15:00

Celtic	1–0	Dundee United
Thompson 11'	Report

Hampden Park, Glasgow
Attendance: 50,635
Referee: John Rowbotham

CELTIC:
GK	20	(Scotland) Rab Douglas
DF	17	(France) Didier Agathe
DF	6	(Guinea) Bobo Baldé
DF	23	(Slovakia) Stanislav Varga	Booked
DF	4	(Scotland) Jackie McNamara (c)
MF	19	(Bulgaria) Stiliyan Petrov
MF	18	(Northern Ireland) Neil Lennon
MF	8	(England) Alan Thompson		(substituted off) 86'
FW	9	(England) Chris Sutton
FW	47	(Wales) Craig Bellamy
FW	10	(Wales) John Hartson		(substituted off) 73'
Substitutes:
GK	22	(Scotland) David Marshall
DF	5	(Belgium) Joos Valgaeren		(substituted on) 73'
MF	14	(Scotland) Paul Lambert
MF	46	(Republic of Ireland) Aiden McGeady		(substituted on) 86'
FW	37	(Scotland) Craig Beattie
Manager:
(Northern Ireland) Martin O'Neill

DUNDEE UNITED:
GK	1	(England) Tony Bullock
DF	2	(Scotland) Mark Wilson
DF	23	(Scotland) Paul Ritchie	Booked
DF	39	(Scotland) Garry Kenneth
DF	5	(Scotland) Alan Archibald	Booked
MF	7	(Scotland) Mark Kerr
MF	4	(Scotland) Derek McInnes (c)		(substituted off) 76'
MF	8	(Scotland) Grant Brebner		(substituted off) 83'
MF	11	(Scotland) Barry Robson	Booked
CF	19	(Scotland) Stephen Crawford		(substituted off) 83'
CF	20	(Trinidad and Tobago) Jason Scotland
Substitutes:
GK	47	(Republic of Ireland) Nick Colgan
DF	3	(Scotland) David McCracken
MF	12	(Scotland) Stuart Duff		(substituted on) 83'
FW	16	(Scotland) James Grady		(substituted on) 83'
FW	9	(Trinidad and Tobago) Collin Samuel		(substituted on) 76'
Manager:
(Scotland) Gordon Chisholm
