= 2004–05 Scottish Cup =

2004–05 Tennent's Scottish Cup
Tournament details
- Country: Scotland

Final positions
- Champions: Celtic
- Runners-up: Dundee United

Tournament statistics
- Matches played: 60

The 2004–05 Scottish Cup was the 120th season of Scotland's most prestigious football knockout competition, also known for sponsorship reasons as the Tennent's Scottish Cup. The Cup was won by Celtic, who defeated Dundee United 1–0 in the final; this was Martin O'Neill's last match in his first tenure as Celtic manager.

== Calendar ==
Round	First match date	Fixtures		Clubs
Round	First match date	Original	Replays	Clubs
First Round		8	0	
Second Round		10	2	→ 32
Third Round		16	3	32 → 16
Fourth Round		8	2	16 → 8
Quarter-finals	26 February 2005	4	0	8 → 4
Semi-finals	9 April 2005	2	0	4 → 2
Final	28 May 2005	1	0	2 → 1

== First round ==
Home team	Score	Away team
Cove Rangers	4 – 1	Dalbeattie Star
Cowdenbeath	2 – 3	Dumbarton
Forfar Athletic	1 – 5	Montrose
Huntly	3 – 1	Peterhead
Glasgow University	0 – 3	Brechin City
Greenock Morton	3 – 1	East Stirlingshire
East Fife	3 – 0	Whitehill Welfare
Inverurie Loco Works	1 – 2	Keith

== Second round ==
Home team	Score	Away team
Albion Rovers	0 – 1	Arbroath
Alloa Athletic	2 – 1	Stenhousemuir
Ayr United	3 – 0	Edinburgh City
Brechin City	1 – 0	Stirling Albion
Cove Rangers	1 – 7	Greenock Morton
Dumbarton	1 – 1	Berwick Rangers
Gretna	3 – 0	Elgin City
Huntly	0 – 0	East Fife
Keith	0 – 1	Montrose
Stranraer	1 – 0	Queen’s Park

=== Replays ===
Home team	Score	Away team
Berwick Rangers	3 – 1	Dumbarton
East Fife	3 – 3 (4 – 3 pen.)	Huntly

== Third round ==
Home team	Score	Away team
Arbroath	0 – 2	Aberdeen
Ayr United	3 – 3	Stranraer
Berwick Rangers	0 – 3	Brechin City
Celtic	2 – 1	Rangers
Clyde	3 – 0	Falkirk
East Fife	0 – 0	Dunfermline Athletic
Gretna	3 – 4	Dundee United
Hibernian	2 – 0	Dundee
Inverness CT	1 – 0	St Johnstone
Kilmarnock	2 – 0	Motherwell
Livingston	2 – 1	Greenock Morton
Montrose	1 – 2	Queen of the South
Partick Thistle	0 – 0	Heart of Midlothian
Raith Rovers	0 – 2	Alloa Athletic
Ross County	4 – 1	Airdrie United
St Mirren	3 – 0	Hamilton Academical

=== Replays ===
Home team	Score	Away team
Dunfermline Athletic	3 – 1	East Fife
Heart of Midlothian	2 – 1	Partick Thistle
Stranraer	0 – 2	Ayr United

== Fourth round ==
Home team	Score	Away team
Aberdeen	2 – 1	Inverness CT
Alloa Athletic	0 – 1	Livingston
Ayr United	0 – 2	St Mirren
Dunfermline Athletic	0 – 3	Celtic
Heart of Midlothian	2 – 2	Kilmarnock
Hibernian	4 – 0	Brechin City
Queen of the South	0 – 3	Dundee United
Ross County	0 – 0	Clyde

=== Replays ===
Home team	Score	Away team
Clyde	2 – 1	Ross County
Kilmarnock	1 – 3	Heart of Midlothian

== Quarter-finals ==
26 February 2005

Hibernian	2–0	St Mirren
Brown 45'; O'Connor 72'

Easter Road, Edinburgh

27 February 2005

Clyde	0–5	Celtic
		Varga 40', 68'; Thompson 48' (pen.); Petrov 60'; Bellamy 72'

Broadwood Stadium, Cumbernauld

27 February 2005

Dundee United	4–1	Aberdeen
Archibald 19'; Grady 29', 47'; Crawford 41'		Byrne 33'

Tannadice Park, Dundee

27 February 2005

Heart of Midlothian	2–1	Livingston
Miller 1'; McAllister 10'		Easton 60'

Tynecastle Stadium, Edinburgh

== Semi-finals ==
9 April 2005

Dundee United	2–1	Hibernian
McIntyre 73'; Scotland 76'	Report	Riordan 58' (pen.)

Hampden Park, Glasgow
Attendance: 27,271
Referee: Mike McCurry

10 April 2005

Heart of Midlothian	1–2	Celtic
Cesnauskis 60'	Report	Sutton 3'; Bellamy 49'

Hampden Park, Glasgow
Attendance: 38,505
Referee: Stuart Dougal

== Final ==
28 May 2005
15:00

Celtic	1–0	Dundee United
Thompson 11'	Report

Hampden Park, Glasgow
Attendance: 50,635
Referee: John Rowbotham

== Largest Wins ==
A list of the largest wins from the competition.

Score	Home team	Away team	Stage
1-7	Cove Rangers	Greenock Morton	Second Round
0-5	Clyde	Celtic	Quarter Finals
1-5	Forfar Athletic	Montrose	First Round
4-0	Hibernian	Brechin City	Third Round
