= The Bhoys from Seville =

Former nickname for Celtic F.C.'s team and fans

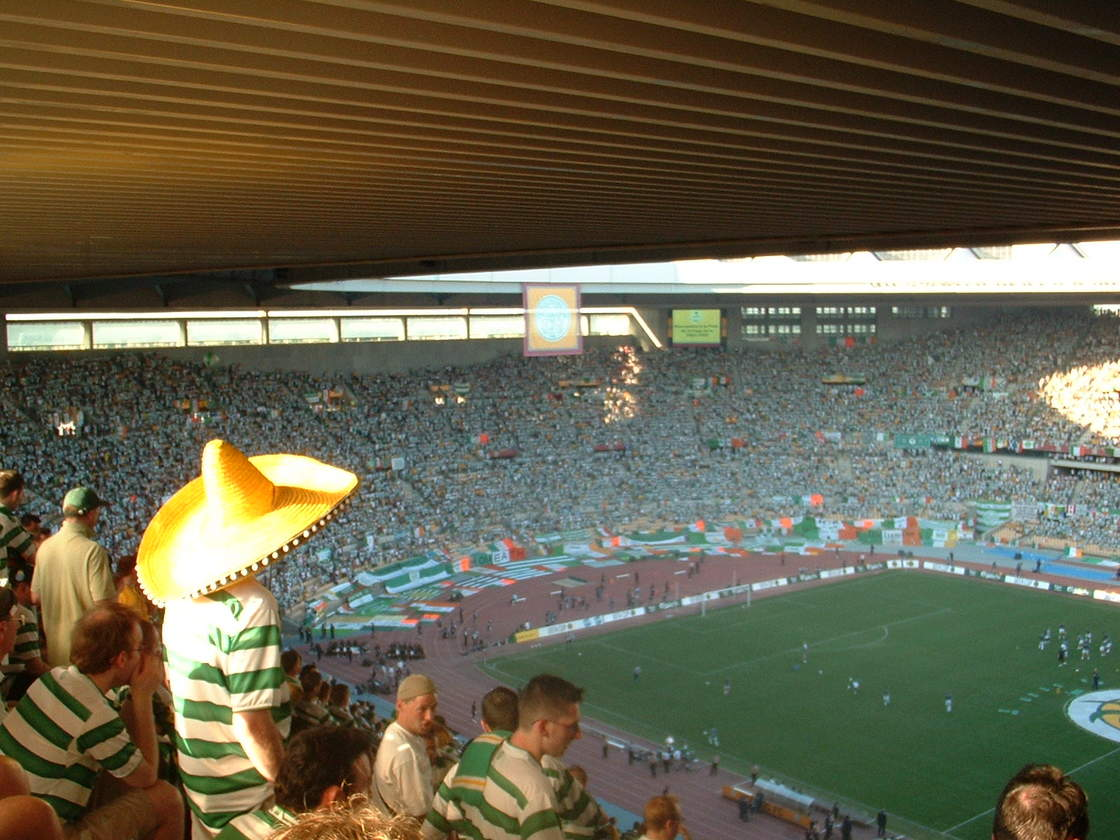
Celtic fans at the Estadio Olímpico in Seville, Spain

The Bhoys from Seville is a nickname used to refer to Celtic F.C.'s team and fans during Celtic's 2002–03 UEFA Cup campaign, which culminated in their defeat in the final against F.C. Porto in Seville, Spain. Around 80,000 Celtic fans travelled to support their team in the final. The name "The Bhoys from Seville" is a play on words from the book and film The Boys from Brazil, the nickname of Celtic F.C. (The Bhoys), and the location of the final (Seville). This UEFA Cup campaign was Celtic's most successful in Europe since their run to the 1970 European Cup final, and the first time in 23 years that they had remained in European competition beyond Christmas.

Although they lost in the final against F.C. Porto, the team has been compared to Celtic's European Cup winning team in 1967, the Lisbon Lions. The estimated 80,000 Celtic supporters who travelled to Seville for the final received widespread praise for their exemplary conduct, and were later awarded Fair Play Awards from UEFA and FIFA "for their extraordinarily loyal and sporting behaviour". The support of the Celtic supporters and the team's performance during the campaign provided the inspiration for a number of books, television programmes and DVDs, primarily highlighting the experiences of the travelling fans.

== Background ==
Celtic F.C.'s participation in the 2002–03 UEFA Cup came as a result of their defeat in the UEFA Champions League third qualifying round against FC Basel (3–3 aggregate score with the Swiss team progressing to the group stage on away goals). During the 2003 UEFA Cup competition, Celtic goalkeeper Rab Douglas and defender Bobo Balde appeared in twelve matches, which led the team in that category. They both missed the 2nd leg of the first round against FK Sūduva. Douglas conceded twelve goals and had six clean sheets. Celtic outscored opponents 27 to 12 on their run to the final. Striker Henrik Larsson scored eleven goals, including a hat-trick in the first game against FK Sūduva.

The motto "V for Victory" was coined during the campaign as every team Celtic faced; FK Sūduva, Blackburn Rovers, Celta Vigo, VfB Stuttgart, Liverpool, and Boavista, each had V in their name, with the exception of the team Celtic played in the final, Porto, although it was highlighted that the game would be in Seville.

In another reference to the letter V, for the days leading up to the game the Daily Record, a Scottish tabloid newspaper, sent an open topped double decker bus to Seville with the slogan "Here V Go" on the side of the bus.

=== First round v FK Sūduva ===
The first game of the campaign was against Lithuanian team FK Sūduva. Sūduva stated that they could not send a scout to Glasgow to spy on Celtic to prepare for their match, and instead had to watch videotapes of their opponents.

Celtic all but won the tie in the first leg at home in Celtic Park on 14 August 2002 with their 8–1 win. Henrik Larsson scored a hat-trick, while Stilian Petrov, Chris Sutton, Paul Lambert, Joos Valgaeren and John Hartson all scored a goal each. Martin O'Neill rested a number of players for the second leg, with first-team regulars such as Larsson, Sutton, Lambert, Valgaeren, Petrov and Neil Lennon all being left in Glasgow. Celtic won the second leg 2–0 and went through to the second round on an aggregate of 10–1.

=== Second round v Blackburn Rovers ===
The next round caught media and football fans attention when Celtic were paired with Blackburn Rovers. The English side were enjoying a good season and eventually finished sixth in the Premiership. Their squad boasted former Man United strikers Dwight Yorke and Andy Cole as well as rising star David Thompson and Irish winger Damien Duff, who had impressed in the 2002 World Cup. The media highlighted that Blackburn Rovers manager Graeme Souness had previously been player-manager of Celtic's city rivals Rangers. The tie was dubbed the Battle of Britain.

Celtic were poor in the first leg at Parkhead, and were outplayed by Blackburn for long spells of the game. Nevertheless, a Henrik Larsson goal five minutes from full-time secured a crucial 1–0 win on the night and a narrow lead to take down to Ewood Park.

In the build-up to the return match, Blackburn captain Gary Flitcroft made public that Souness had commented in the dressing room after the first game that Blackburn should have won the game and that it was like watching "men against boys." Flitcroft also added his own opinion that no Celtic player had impressed him. In a press conference the day before the second game, Souness stated that if Celtic scored one goal then Blackburn would score three.

In the second leg, Celtic showed much more composure and scored after 14 minutes through Larsson. Celtic were now 2–0 ahead on aggregate and controlled the game after that to the joy of their 7,500 travelling fans. Former Blackburn striker Chris Sutton scored another goal for Celtic after 68 minutes and the match ended with Celtic winning 2–0 on the second leg and 3–0 on aggregate.

=== Third round v Celta Vigo ===
Celtic's third round UEFA cup opponents were Celta Vigo. In the first leg, Henrik Larsson scored the only goal of the game in Glasgow to give Celtic a slender 1–0 advantage to take to Spain. The match was overshadowed by the eccentric refereeing of Claude Columbo, who sent Celtic's Martin O'Neill from the home dugout during the game. O'Neill received a two-game touchline ban, but this was later reduced to a one match ban after an appeal.

The return match saw Celta Vigo's Jesuli level the tie on aggregate after 24 minutes. Celtic rallied, and on 37 minutes John Hartson used his body strength to force his way into the Spanish penalty box and score with a powerful shot. Crucially, due to the away goals rule, Celta Viga now had to score twice to avoid losing the tie. Benni McCarthy scored early in the second half for Celta Vigo but, despite a glaring miss from Jesuli near the end, Celtic held on to win the tie on away goals. The 1–2 loss on the night was the first of two defeats for Celtic on the way to the final.

This was the first time ever that Celtic had knocked out a Spanish club in European competition, and also the first time in 23 years that Celtic had remained in European competition beyond Christmas.

=== Fourth round v VfB Stuttgart ===
The opponent for Celtic in the fourth round was German Bundesliga team VfB Stuttgart. Celtic went into the first leg at Celtic Park with John Hartson suspended and Henrik Larsson absent due to sustaining a broken jaw in league match. Despite Stuttgart's Marcelo Bordon getting sent off on 16 minutes, the German's still took the lead with a goal from Kevin Kurányi on 27 minutes. Celtic rallied and were 2–1 up at half-time after goals from Paul Lambert and Shaun Maloney. A Stilyan Petrov goal in the second half clinched a 3–1 win.

A reported 10,000 Celtic fans travelled to Germany to cheer on Celtic in the second leg. John Hartson returned from suspension to the starting line-up whilst defender Ulrik Laursen also came into the side; with Shaun Maloney and Jackie McNamara dropping out. After early pressure from Stuttgart, Celtic scored on 12 minutes; Hartson played a pass from midfield out wide right to Didier Agathe, who raced down the wing and on reaching the bye-line crossed in to the Stuttgart penalty box. Hartson headed the ball towards the back post and Alan Thompson scored with a diving header. Two minutes later Celtic extended their lead. Agathe was again the provider, racing 50 yards down the right wing and cutting the ball into the penalty box to Chris Sutton who scored from close range with a powerful shot. That left Stuttgart requiring to score five goals to salvage the tie. A comeback by the Bundesliga club saw them eventually win 3–2 on the second leg, but Celtic won the tie 5–4 on aggregate.

=== Quarter-final v Liverpool ===
The quarter-finals saw another English Premiership opponent for Celtic, this time Liverpool. Liverpool was competing in the UEFA Cup after it finished third in Group B of the 2002–03 Champions League, which also featured Celtic's conquerors in the qualifying round, FC Basel, who finished second.

The first leg took place at Celtic Park on 13 March 2003. This clash was again billed as the "Battle of Britain". Before kick off, Gerry Marsden led both sets of supporters in a rousing version of "You'll Never Walk Alone". Celtic then started the match on the attack, John Hartson hitting the crossbar after only 12 seconds. Henrik Larsson, in his first match back after recovering from a broken jaw, then opened the scoring after 100 seconds from close range. Emile Heskey equalised for Liverpool on 16 minutes, latching on to a John Arne Riise cross from the left and shooting past Rab Douglas from a tight angle. The match finished at 1–1, with the away goal giving Liverpool the advantage going in to their home tie at Anfield. Liverpool player El Hadji Diouf spat at a Celtic supporter during the match, and was later fined £5,000 at Glasgow's Sheriff Court for the incident.

The return match at Anfield took place the following week. Celtic's Alan Thompson and Liverpool's Dietmar Hamann both came close to scoring in the opening quarter-hour with long range shots. On 19 minutes, Jerzy Dudek turned a 30-yard free kick from Henrik Larsson around the post. Two minutes from half time, Celtic were awarded a free kick 25 yards from goal. Thompson struck a low shot past Dudek from the set piece, with the ball going under the defensive wall, which had jumped up and appeared to distract the Liverpool goalkeeper. Celtic sealed their victory on 82 minutes when John Hartson played a one-two with Larsson, and then drove a swerving shot from 25 yards out into the top-right corner of Dudek's goal. Celtic's 2–0 win saw them win the tie 3–1 on aggregate and progress to the semi-finals.

=== Semi-final v Boavista ===
Celtic's first European semi-final since the early 1970s saw them paired against Portuguese team Boavista. As with all the previous rounds, Celtic were drawn to play the first leg of the tie at Celtic Park.

In the first leg Celtic went a goal down through an own goal from Joos Valgaeren on 48 minutes. Larsson equalised seconds later, but then missed a penalty kick on 75 minutes. Despite a couple of good chances near the end of the game, Celtic were unable to score a winning goal. The 1–1 draw, watched by around 60,000 fans, was Martin O'Neill's 50th unbeaten match at Celtic Park, a record of results that stretched back to their last home defeat which was against Ajax in August 2001.

In a difficult return leg, Celtic toiled to break down a dour Boavista side who knew that a scoreless draw was all they needed to reach the final. An opportunistic strike by Larsson on 80 minutes won the match and the tie for Celtic, meaning that Celtic went through to the final, preventing an all-Portugal, and all-Oporto, final.

== Celtic fans in Seville ==
Celtic were the first Scottish team in 16 years to reach a European final and the first Celtic team to reach a European final since the 1970 European Cup Final. Their opponents in the final were Portuguese club Porto, who had defeated Lazio 4–1 on aggregate in the other semi-final. The match was played at the Estadio Olímpico in Seville.

Tickets for the match had been selling for £500 in the lead up to the game. UEFA and the Spanish police had warned Celtic fans to avoid buying the 700 estimated fake tickets that were circulating before the game. Many of the fans who were not able to get tickets for the final watched the game on a large screen placed a mile from the stadium.

There was a scramble to arrange travel to Spain, and Celtic fans travelled by plane, car, bus, train and ferry to get to Seville on time. Many fans travelled to Seville on day trips and returned to Scotland early the next morning after the match. The first charter flights to Spain on the day of the match left Scotland well before dawn. About 33 charter planes departed before midday with over 9,000 Celtic fans on board. 2,000 more travelled on scheduled flights. At Glasgow Prestwick Airport, 9 charter flights departed before 9 a.m. BST with 3,500 fans.

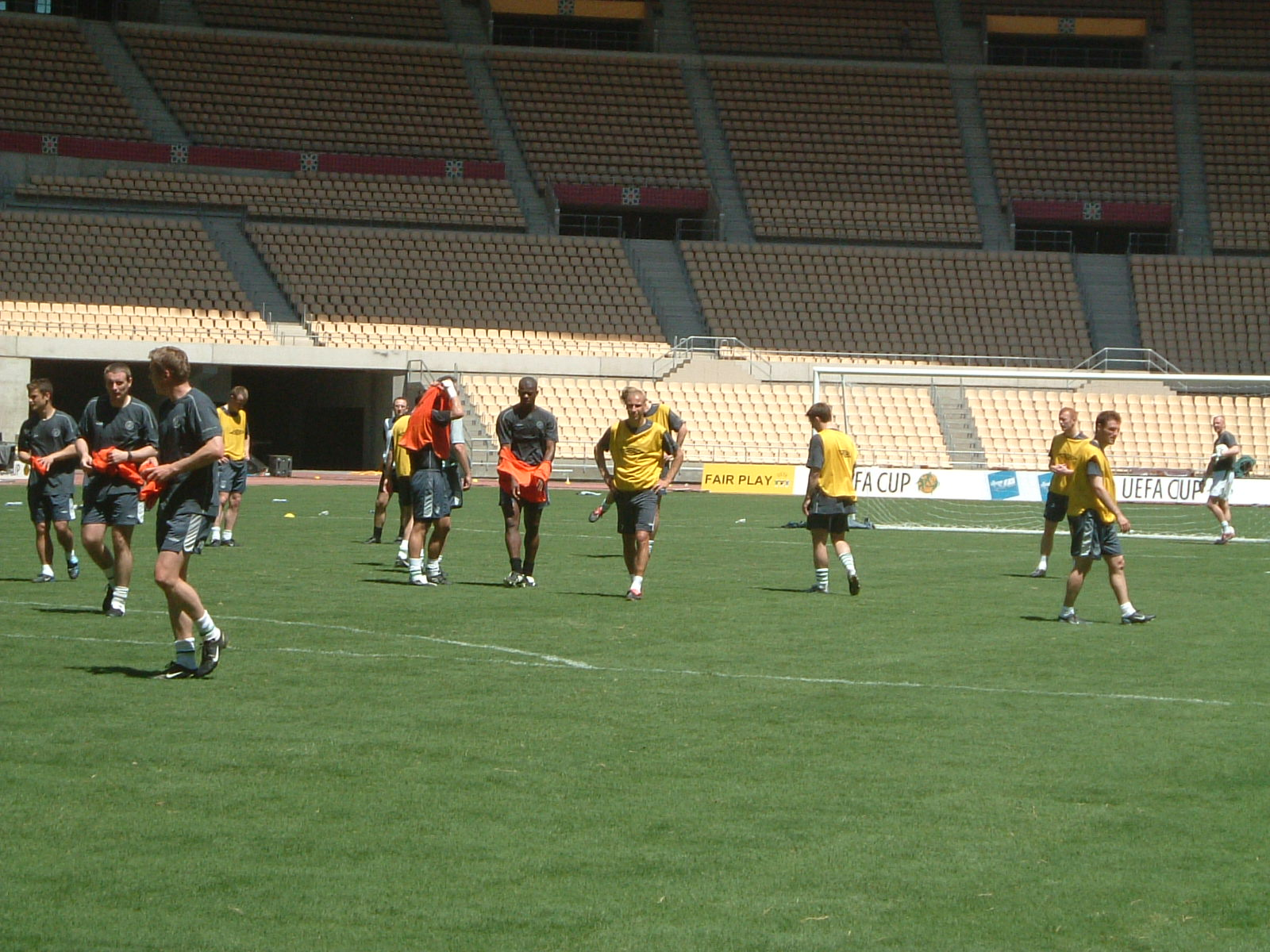
The Celtic players train at the stadium before the final

Tens of thousands of Celtic fans travelled to Seville during the days leading up to the match, partying in a carnival atmosphere. Many of the supporters congregated in the Cathedral area of the city. One Irish pub was reported to have sold 300 barrels in the day leading up to the final, to satisfy the thirst of supporters in the near 100 degree heat (~ 37 °C). By the day of the final, an estimated 80,000 Celtic supporters had arrived in Seville.

=== The final vs. F.C. Porto ===
The humid weather meant that the game was played at a relatively slow pace, which seemed to favour Porto. This caused a number of rash challenges from Celtic, one of which led to Joos Valgaeren getting a yellow card on 8 minutes. After this it was very much a stoic affair, until 32 minutes into the first half when Capucho played in Deco, but he could do no more than fire his shot straight at Celtic's goalkeeper Robert Douglas. Straight after this attack Celtic broke on the counter with Henrik Larsson, putting Didier Agathe through on the right, but his cross was too high for Chris Sutton. Larsson had a chance to make it 1–0 on 35 minutes, but from Sutton's assist he was unable to make enough contact with the ball. Porto came close on 41 minutes when Deco moved past Bobo Baldé to go one on one against Robert Douglas, who saved Deco's shot with his legs. Porto finally found a way through on 45 minutes when, after an offensive play from Deco, Derlei followed up Dmitri Alenichev's shot on target, which had been saved by Robert Douglas. This gave Porto a 1–0 lead on the stroke of half time and Derlei's 11th goal of the competition.

"I've seen a few of these finals, European finals, I think something
over 25 now. And I don't think I've ever seen support like this,
provided by the supporters of Celtic ... It's magnificent."

— Comment made by Barry Davies during his live commentary
of the 2003 UEFA Cup Final

Porto were unable to hold onto their lead for long; two minutes after the restart, Celtic equalised when Henrik Larsson met Didier Agathe's cross to send a looping header in over Porto's goalkeeper Vítor Baía to get his tenth goal of the tournament and his 200th Celtic goal. However, within five minutes, it was 2–1 to Porto when Deco's through ball found Dmitri Alenichev, who scored with a low shot. Just three minutes later, Celtic equalised once again through Larsson when he headed in Alan Thompson's corner. After this, the game stagnated until a couple of minutes from the end of the game when Jackie McNamara's errant pass found Alenichev, who shot over the crossbar.

Normal time ended with the game at 2–2. The ensuing periods of extra time saw defensive football from both sides; Celtic was down to ten men when Bobo Balde was dismissed on 95 minutes after his second yellow card. On 112 minutes, Derlei reacted quickest to a Robert Douglas block and rounded McNamara make it 3–2 for Porto. Porto managed to hang on even after having Nuno Valente sent off just before the end of extra-time, ensuring that they ended their 16-year wait between European trophies. It was Porto's first UEFA Cup win, and they were also the first team to win a trophy on the silver goal rule.

After the match Henrik Larsson said in an interview that he was disappointed to have scored two goals in the final and still come away with a runners up medal. Larsson stated that there was nothing to be happy about the outcome of the final. He told BBC Sport, "I've said before, I'd much rather not score and be able to lift the UEFA Cup, than to score twice and finish up on the losing side. There's nothing to be happy about, but now we have to find a way to lift ourselves for the league game on Sunday."

The Porto manager, José Mourinho, led his team to the Champions League title the following year before moving to Chelsea. Reflecting on the final, Mourinho was happy to admit he played part of a historic moment in football. He said, "As a football game, Celtic-Porto in Seville was the most exciting football game I have ever been involved in. An unbelievable game. Every time I see Martin O'Neill I remember I was the lucky one that day. An incredible match. I've never seen such emotional people. It was unbelievable."

==== The team for the final ====
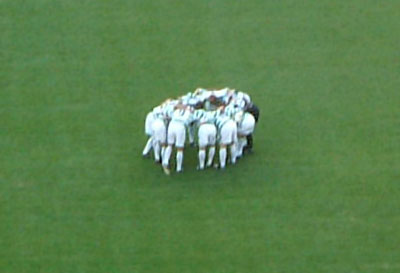
Celtic do their customary huddle before the final

CELTIC:
GK	20	(Scotland) Robert Douglas
RWB	17	(France) Didier Agathe
CB	5	(Belgium) Joos Valgaeren	(yellow card) 8'	(substituted off) 65'
CB	6	(Guinea) Bobo Baldé	(yellow card) 95' (yellow-red card)
CB	35	(Sweden) Johan Mjällby
LWB	8	(England) Alan Thompson
CM	14	(Scotland) Paul Lambert (c)		(substituted off) 77'
CM	18	(Northern Ireland) Neil Lennon	(yellow card) 59'
CM	19	(Bulgaria) Stiliyan Petrov	(yellow card) 102'	(substituted off) 105'
CF	9	(England) Chris Sutton
CF	7	(Sweden) Henrik Larsson	47', 57'
Substitutes:
GK	21	(Sweden) Magnus Hedman
DF	4	(Scotland) Jackie McNamara		(substituted on) 77'
DF	16	(Denmark) Ulrik Laursen		(substituted on) 65'
MF	3	(Guinea) Mohammed Sylla
MF	39	(Scotland) Jamie Smith
FW	12	(Spain) David Fernández
FW	29	(Scotland) Shaun Maloney		(substituted on) 105'
Manager:
(Northern Ireland) Martin O'Neill

=== Match facts ===
(Scotland) Celtic	Statistic	(Portugal) Porto
3	Shots on target	11
33	Fouls	24
5	Corners	5
4	Off-side	2
44%	Ball possession	56%
5 (Valgaeren, Lennon, Petrov, Balde x 2)	Yellow cards	5 (Derlei, Alenichev, Ferreira, Valente x 2)
1 (Balde)	Red cards	1 (Valente)

=== Viewing figures ===
The cup final was broadcast live on BBC One in the UK, and the viewing figures were as follows:

- Match average - 8.3 million, 34.8% audience share
- Programme average - 7.8 million, 33.6% audience share
- Viewing peaked at 10 million for the quarter-hour 10.00–10.15pm

BBC Head of Football, Niall Sloane said: "We're delighted that so many people tuned in to follow a British team's progress in the final. We're only sorry that Celtic didn't win."

== Fans' awards ==
Approximately 80,000 Celtic supporters, the largest travelling support in history at that time, made the journey to Seville for this game. The exemplary conduct of the Celtic supporters (three arrests the night before the game, no arrests at all on the day of the final) received widespread praise from the people of Seville, and the fans were awarded Fair Play Awards from both UEFA and FIFA "for their extraordinarily loyal and sporting behaviour". Celtic Supporters Association general secretary Eddie Toner said, "The Fair Play Award is a fantastic tribute to the Celtic supporters who represented the club in Europe so magnificently last season. Celtic supporters have travelled in large numbers throughout Europe over many years and they have rightly earned an excellent reputation during this time. The Fair Play Award is further recognition of the Celtic supporters' high standing in Europe and an honour which is well deserved."

FIFA president Sepp Blatter also praised the Celtic fans when he presented the FIFA Fair Play award at Celtic Park; "I can only say that this is not the first time that Celtic fans have presented themselves as warm and wonderful supporters."

Sevilla fans travelling to the 2006–07 UEFA Cup in Glasgow noted that the visiting Celtic fans in 2003 had left them with a "great impression" of Glasgow.

Preceded by Football communities of Japan and Korea Republic	FIFA Fair Play Award Winners; 2003	Succeeded by Confederação Brasileira de Futebol

== In media and popular culture ==
The team and their supporters have since become known as "The Bhoys from Seville"; this is a play on words from the book and film The Boys from Brazil, the nickname of Celtic (the Bhoys), and the location of the UEFA Cup final (Seville). Although they lost in the final, the team is still compared favourably with European Cup winning team of 1967, the Lisbon Lions.

The support of the Celtic supporters and the team's performance during the campaign provided the inspiration for a number of books, television programmes, and DVDs. This included a book called Over and Over, which documented the experience of the travelling fans. The official video and DVD produced by the club was entitled The Road to Seville. The DVD edition included a bonus disc featuring the full away match with Liverpool at Anfield. A television programme and subsequent DVD produced by STV was called The Bhoys from Seville.

The Bhoys from Seville DVD focused on the fans and their endeavours to get to Spain and see the final. The DVD also contained broadcasts from Scottish news programmes from Seville and a tribute piece to the Lisbon Lions.

=== Celts in Seville stage play ===
Actor and playwright Tony Roper wrote a play entitled Celts in Seville, the story of a typical Celtic supporting-family following the team over the course of their run to the final in Seville. The play enjoyed a successful initial run in 2008, and a similarly successful rerun in 2014. Roper wrote the play to highlight the passionate but good-natured support of Celtic fans during the campaign, stating "The reason I wrote this was not to celebrate Celtic not winning the UEFA cup, the reason I wrote the play was to celebrate Celtic supporters' way of not winning the cup."

== Campaign results ==
2002–03 UEFA Cup
Date	Venue	Opponents	Score	Round	Celtic scorers
19 September 2002	Celtic Park, Glasgow (H)	(Lithuania) FK Sūduva	8–1	First round, First leg	Larsson (3), Petrov, Sutton, Lambert, Valgaeren, Hartson
3 October 2002	Sūduva Stadium, Marijampolė (A)	(Lithuania) FK Sūduva	0–2	First round, Second leg	Fernández, Thompson
31 October 2002	Celtic Park, Glasgow (H)	(England) Blackburn Rovers	1–0	Second round, First leg	Larsson
14 November 2002	Ewood Park, Blackburn (A)	(England) Blackburn Rovers	0–2	Second round, Second leg	Larsson, Sutton
28 November 2002	Celtic Park, Glasgow (H)	(Spain) Celta Vigo	1–0	Third round, First leg	Larsson
12 December 2002	Estadio Balaídos, Vigo (A)	(Spain) Celta Vigo	2–1	Third round, Second leg	Hartson
20 February 2003	Celtic Park, Glasgow (H)	(Germany) VfB Stuttgart	3–1	Fourth round, First leg	Lambert, Maloney, Petrov
27 February 2003	Gottlieb-Daimler-Stadion, Stuttgart (A)	(Germany) VfB Stuttgart	3–2	Fourth round, Second leg	Thompson, Sutton
13 March 2003	Celtic Park, Glasgow (H)	(England) Liverpool	1–1	Quarter-final, First leg	Larsson
20 March 2003	Anfield, Liverpool (A)	(England) Liverpool	0–2	Quarter-final, Second leg	Thompson, Hartson
10 April 2003	Celtic Park, Glasgow (H)	(Portugal) Boavista	1–1	Semi-final, First leg	Larsson
24 April 2003	Estádio do Bessa, Porto (A)	(Portugal) Boavista	0–1	Semi-final, Second leg	Larsson
21 May 2003	Estadio Olímpico de Sevilla, Seville (N)	(Portugal) Porto	2–3	Final	Larsson (2)

== See also ==
- History of Celtic F.C.
- Celtic F.C. in international football
