= Celtic F.C. supporters =

Group of football supporters

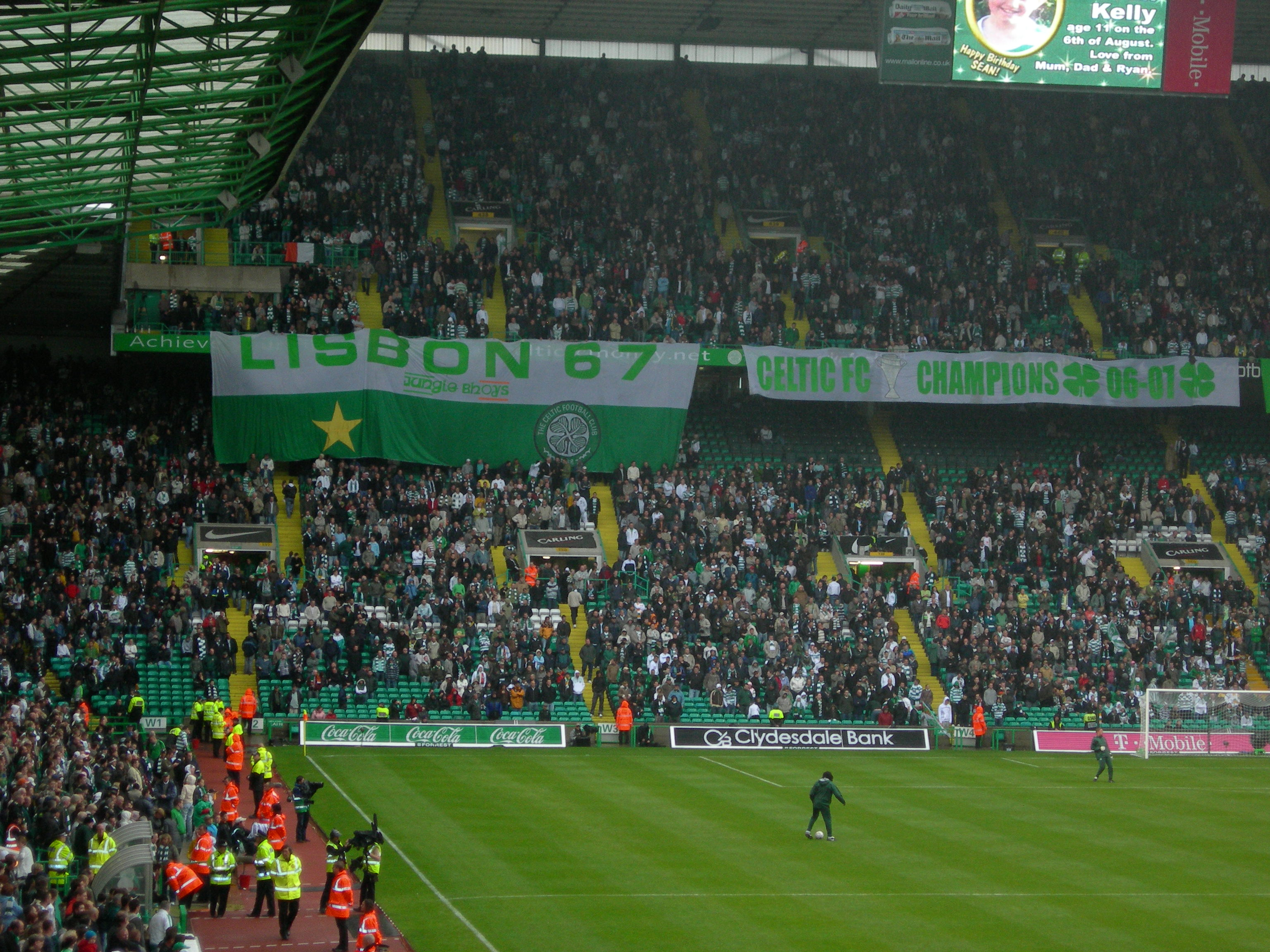
Celtic supporters commemorating the team's 1967 European Cup victory.

The supporters of Celtic FC, a Scottish football club, were estimated in 2003 to number around 12 million worldwide. Numerous fan magazines and supporters' websites are dedicated to the club, and there are in excess of 800 supporters' clubs in over 60 countries around the world.

Celtic supporters have traditionally come from the Catholic population of Scotland and people of Irish background, but not exclusively. In 2003, Celtic fans received awards from FIFA and UEFA for their exemplary fair and cordial conduct after 80,000 fans had travelled to Seville for the 2003 UEFA Cup final. In 2017, Celtic fans were awarded with the FIFA Fan Award for their tifo commemorating the 50th anniversary of the club's 1967 European Cup win.

== Famous fans ==
- Jay Baruchel, Canadian actor
- Finn Bálor, Irish professional wrestler
- Norman Blake, lead singer of Teenage Fanclub
- Frankie Boyle, Scottish stand-up comedian
- Susan Boyle, Scottish singer
- Stuart Braithwaite, guitarist in Scottish post-rock band, Mogwai.
- Kevin Bridges, Scottish stand-up comedian
- Alison Brie, American actress
- Charlie Burchill, lead guitarist and founding member of Simple Minds
- Gerard Butler, Scottish actor
- Lewis Capaldi, Scottish singer-songwriter
- Joe Coffey, Scottish professional wrestler
- Mark Coffey, Scottish professional wrestler
- Wolfgang, Scottish professional wrestler
- Billy Connolly, Scottish stand-up comedian and actor
- Martin Compston, Scottish actor
- Tony Curran, Scottish actor
- Lana Del Rey, American singer-songwriter
- Dominik Diamond, Scottish presenter and newspaper columnist
- Robert Downey Jr., American actor
- Francis Dunnery, English musician, singer-songwriter, and record producer
- Siobhan Fahey, Irish singer
- Kirsty Gallacher, Scottish journalist
- Liam Gallagher, English singer and frontman of Oasis
- Noel Gallagher, English musician and member of Oasis
- George Galloway, British politician
- Chris Geddes, keyboardist and founding member of Belle and Sebastian
- Karen Gillan, Scottish actress
- Bobby Gillespie, lead singer of Primal Scream
- Stephen Graham, English actor
- Clare Grogan, actress and singer
- Kevin Guthrie, Scottish actor
- Jon Hamm, American actor
- Fran Healy, lead singer of Travis
- Ariel Helwani, Canadian journalist
- John Higgins, snooker player
- Jay-Z, American rapper
- Richard Jobson, Scottish filmmaker, television presenter, and lead singer of punk band Skids
- Robbie Keane, Irish footballer
- Roy Keane, Irish footballer.
- Michelle Keegan, English actress
- Jim Kerr, lead singer and founding member of Simple Minds
- CM Punk, American professional wrestler
- Sami Zayn, Canadian professional wrestler
- Rory Kinnear, English actor
- Declan Michael Laird, actor
- Jenny Lewis, American musician
- Noah Lomax, American actor
- Shane Long, Irish footballer
- Jennifer Love Hewitt, American actress
- Tony Lundon, Irish singer and former member of Liberty X
- Johnny Marr, English musician and former guitarist of The Smiths
- James McAvoy, Scottish actor
- Ross McCall, Scottish actor
- James McClean, Irish footballer
- Aaron McCusker, Northern Irish actor
- Martine McCutcheon, English singer, TV personality and actress
- Paul McGinley, Irish golfer
- Rory McGrath, British comedian
- Conor McGregor, Irish MMA fighter
- Eddie McGuire, Australian television presenter and AFL commentator
- Chris McQueer, Scottish writer and spoken word performer
- Ilir Meta, President of Albania
- Mark Millar, Scottish comic book writer and artist
- Frankie Miller, Scottish singer
- Gary Mounfield, bassist formerly of The Stone Roses and currently of Primal Scream
- Kevin Nolan, English footballer and manager
- Paolo Nutini, Scottish singer
- Brendan O'Carroll, Irish actor and comedian.
- Daniel Portman, Scottish actor
- Johnathan Rice, Scottish-American singer-songwriter
- Brendan Rodgers, Northern Irish football manager and former player
- Wayne Rooney, English footballer
- Tony Roper, Scottish actor, comedian and writer
- Duke Roufus, American former kickboxer
- Sheamus, Irish professional wrestler
- Trevor Sinclair, English footballer
- Snoop Dogg, American rapper
- Sharleen Spiteri, lead singer of Texas
- Rod Stewart, English singer
- Lawrence Tynes, Scottish-born former American football player
- The View, Scottish indie rock band
- Christoph Waltz, Austrian-German actor
- Humza Yousaf, former First Minister of Scotland

== Fanbase ==
Celtic was founded as a charity for poor Irish immigrants in Glasgow by Brother Walfrid, a Marist Brother originally from County Sligo, Ireland. Consequently, Celtic is strongly associated with Scotland's Irish Catholic community and have a significant number of supporters in Ireland and among members of the Irish diaspora elsewhere.

=== Worldwide ===
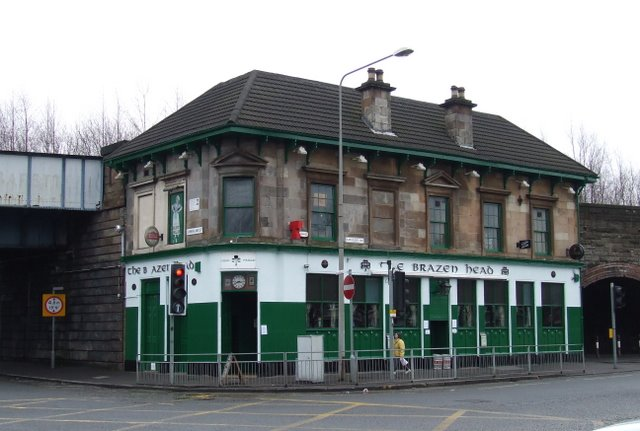
This Celtic pub is located in The Gorbals, an area of Glasgow where thousands of Irish emigrants to Scotland settled

Celtic has developed a fanbase in a number of countries around the world, with over 800 supporters' clubs in over 60 countries around the world. Research in 2003 by Capita Consulting in conjunction with the Cranfield Institute estimated the worldwide fan base as being around nine million.

There are Celtic supporters clubs in South Korea, Sweden Croatia, Germany, Denmark and Norway while the club's profile in Kenya has been boosted by a team in Nairobi, Kibera Celtic, who were inspired by Celtic's charitable roots and use the profits from football to fund charitable initiatives in Kenya and throughout Africa. This fanbase extended to Japan in 2005, when Japanese international Shunsuke Nakamura joined the club, although the Tokyo Celtic Supporters' Club had already been established in 2001.

In 2003, it was estimated that Celtic had a fanbase of one million in the United States and Canada. In 2002, former Rangers director, Hugh Adam, claimed that Celtic were "the best-supported football club in North America" and that the club's "Irish connection" was a determinant factor in their popularity. In 2004, The Sunday Times, when commentating on several European teams who were touring in the U.S. at the time, stated that clubs such as Chelsea, Real Madrid and Manchester United attracted support in the United States only when touring the country. In contrast, Celtic were said to "have such a strong pre-existing relationship with a huge expatriate following here that their support will endure." There are around 80 Celtic supporters clubs in North America, and nearly half of all U.S. states have a Celtic supporters club.

Celtic have also developed supporters clubs in Australia, South Africa, and elsewhere in the Southern Hemisphere.

== Attendance ==
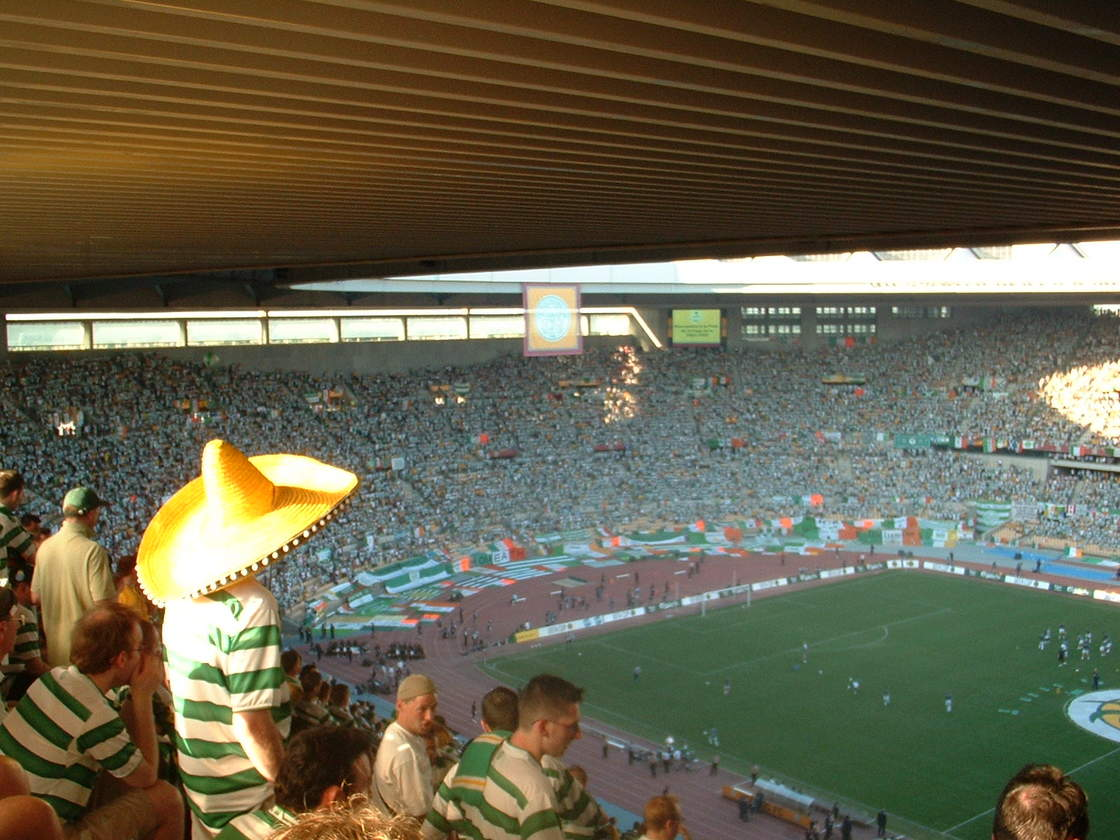
Celtic fans at the Estadio de La Cartuja in Seville, 2003

Celtic's home stadium is Celtic Park, located in Parkhead in the East End of Glasgow. It is the sixth largest stadium in the United Kingdom and the largest football stadium in Scotland. Celtic Park's capacity has been 60,832 since the mid-1990s following redevelopment that turned it into an all-seater stadium, then in 2002 was put down to 60,501 then in 2003 until the present 2013–14 season put down again to 60,355.

Celtic Park's average attendance for the 2010–11 season was 48,968, the highest in Scottish football and the twelfth highest in Europe. Celtic's highest average attendance over the last ten seasons was 58,150 in the 2005–06 season. Over the next three seasons Celtic's average attendance remained above 57,000 before dropping to 45,582 during the 2009–10 season. A study of stadium attendance figures from 2013 to 2018 by the CIES Football Observatory ranked Celtic at 16th in the world during that period, with the proportion of the distribution of spectators in Scotland at 36.5%, the highest of any club in the leagues examined (Rangers were not far behind at 18th place globally and 27.4% of national audience share).

The Scottish Cup final in 1937 between Celtic and Aberdeen at Hampden Park was watched by a crowd of 146,433, which is a record for a club match in Europe. In 1970, Celtic's 'home' leg of their two-legged European Cup semi-final tie against Leeds United was played at Hampden Park to accommodate the expected large attendance. A 136,505 crowd watched Celtic win 2–1 on the night, a record attendance for a competitive European club tie that stands to this day.

The club's large travelling support make Celtic a popular choice of opponent for English-based footballers to select for testimonial matches. Over 5000 Celtic supporters turned for Peter Beardsley's testimonial match at St James' Park, Newcastle, in January 1999. An estimated 15,000 Celtic supporters attended at Old Trafford for the testimonials of Bryan Robson in November 1990 and for Ryan Giggs in August 2001.

=== 2003 UEFA Cup final ===
In 2003, Celtic reached the UEFA Cup final, with the match ending 3–2 to FC Porto. An estimated 80,000 Celtic supporters travelled to Seville for the occasion. Celtic fans received awards from UEFA and FIFA for their "loyal and sporting behaviour" at the match. FIFA president Sepp Blatter also praised the Celtic fans when he presented the FIFA Fair Play award at Celtic Park; "I can only say that this is not the first time that Celtic fans have presented themselves as warm and wonderful supporters." The massive travelling support that followed Celtic over to Seville to watch them in the final became known as The Bhoys from Seville.

== Old Firm rivalry ==
Celtic's traditional rivals are Rangers; collectively, the two clubs are known as the Old Firm. The two have dominated Scottish football's history; between them, they have won the Scottish league championship 104 times since its inception in 1890 – all other clubs combined have won 19 championships.

The rivalry between the teams had various ethnic, religious and political associations, in that Celtic are associated with Irish Catholic origins and Rangers with Scotland's Protestant and British Unionist communities. A report prepared for Glasgow City Council in 2003 found that 74% of Celtic supporters described themselves as Roman Catholic and 10% as Protestant. For Rangers supporters, the figures were 5% and 65% respectively.

"The clubs have attracted the support of opposing factions in the political difficulties of Northern Ireland, which intensified the rivalry in Scotland." Anti-sectarian charity Nil by Mouth notes that some supporters use songs, chants and banners on match days to express abuse or support towards the Protestant or Catholic faiths and proclaim support for Northern Irish-based terrorist groups such as the IRA and UVF. A study in 2008 by the University of Strathclyde found that the Old Firm rivalry was "strongly linked to the conflict in Northern Ireland".

There have been about 400 Old Firm matches played. The games have been described as having an "atmosphere of hatred, religious tension and intimidation which continues to lead to violence in communities across Scotland." The rivalry has fuelled many assaults and even deaths on Old Firm Derby days. Admissions to hospital emergency rooms have been reported to increase ninefold over normal levels and journalist Franklin Foer noted that in the period from 1996 to 2003, eight deaths in Glasgow were directly linked to Old Firm matches, and hundreds of assaults.

Occurrences of serious crowd trouble between Celtic and Rangers supporters stretches as far back as the 1909 Scottish Cup final, which was contested by the two sides. The tie went to a replay after the first match ended in a 2–2 draw. The replayed match also ended in a draw (1–1) after 90 minutes. Despite public expectations, no extra time was played and in response thousands of supporters from both sides invaded the pitch to vent their frustration, causing £1,000 of damage (a substantial sum in the 1900s, equivalent to around £120,000 today). Both clubs petitioned the Scottish Football Association to have the tie abandoned and their demands were met when officials decided the match would not be replayed. The cup and all medals were withheld for that year.

Both sets of fans fought an on-pitch battle in the aftermath of Celtic's 1–0 victory in the 1980 Scottish Cup final at Hampden Park. In January 1988, Mark Walters became the first black footballer to play for Rangers; he made his debut in an Old Firm game at Parkhead and was subjected to racial taunts from Celtic fans, some of whom also threw bananas towards the pitch. There was serious fan disorder during an Old Firm match played in May 1999 at Celtic Park; missiles were thrown by Celtic fans, including one which struck referee Hugh Dallas, who needed medical treatment. Rangers are renowned for their chanting of the sectarian song 'The Billy Boys' during games.

=== Sectarianism ===
Both clubs have taken measures to reduce sectarianism. In 1996 Celtic launched their Bhoys Against Bigotry campaign, later followed by Youth Against Bigotry to "educate the young on having ... respect for all aspects of the community — all races, all colours, all creeds". Celtic partnered with Rangers to form the 'Old Firm Alliance' in 2005, an initiative aimed at educating children from across Glasgow about issues like healthy eating and fitness, as well as awareness of anti-social behaviour, sectarianism and racism.

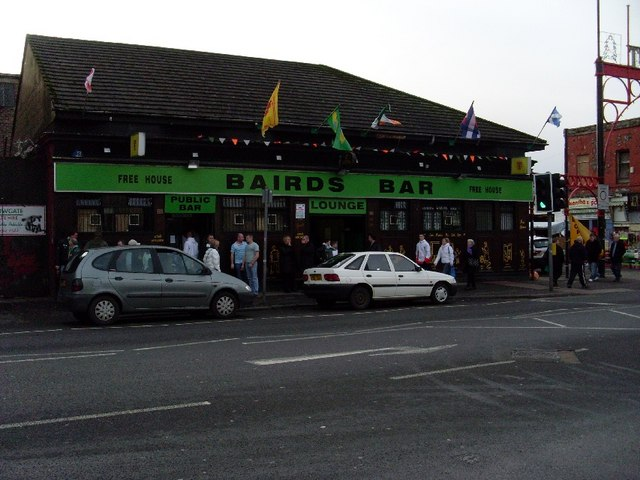
several Celtic themed pubs are located in the streets around The Barras market east of Glasgow city centre

In March 2008, UEFA investigated Celtic fans for alleged sectarian singing at a match against Barcelona. However the case was dropped before the end of the month due to a lack of evidence. In November 2011, Celtic were again under investigation by UEFA for alleged offensive chants from their fans during their Europa League game against Rennes. On this occasion UEFA found the Celtic fans to have been guilty of "illicit chanting" and fined the club £12,700.

In April 2012, the general secretary of the Celtic Supporters Association said he was "genuinely sorry" after tweeting that it was a "problem" that the Protestant workers who built the Titanic "didn't sail on it".

== Irish republicanism ==
Celtic supporters have traditionally been associated with support for Irish republicanism, and the flying of Irish flags at matches is common. Some groups of Celtic supporters also sing or chant Irish folk and rebel songs, which express support for the Irish struggle for freedom. These songs are culturally emblematic to Irish society and the historic founding of the Irish Free State. In 2008 and 2010, there were protests by groups of fans over the team wearing the poppy symbol for Remembrance Day, as it is a divisive symbol in Ireland. Celtic have expressed disapproval of these protests, saying they are damaging to the image of the club and its fans, and that they will ban those involved.

In November 2011, Celtic were fined £12,700 by UEFA for pro-IRA chanting from some Celtic supporters. In response to this in their UEFA Europa League game against Udinese, Celtic fans were seen to have unveiled a banner reading "Fuck UEFA". The club condemned the act, banning for life the supporter responsible for the display, whilst UEFA fined Celtic €25,000 in relation to the incident and related events during the match.

In December 2013, the club were fined £42,000 by UEFA for an "incident of a non-sporting nature" in relation to a display shown by a section of the Celtic support before their Champions League group stage tie against Italian side AC Milan. The banners displayed by the Green Brigade ultras group showed portraits of Scottish hero William Wallace and Irish hunger striker Bobby Sands side by side along with the text: "The terrorist or the dreamer? The savage or the brave? Depends on whose vote you're trying to catch or whose face you're trying to save". After the disciplinary hearing, the club issued a statement in which they condemned the banners and stated that the actions of a "small minority must stop". After the incident, Celtic relocated 250 supporters from section 111 and issued temporary bans to over 100 more.

== The Green Brigade ==
The Green Brigade are a group within the Celtic support who style themselves on the ultras groups found amongst many European and South American football supporters. They were formed in 2006 and describe themselves as "a broad front of anti-fascist, anti-racist and anti-sectarian Celtic supporters". The Green Brigade have organised various displays at Celtic matches involving banners, flags and demonstrations which have been credited with improving the atmosphere at Celtic Park. In November 2012, the Green Brigade organised a full stadium pre-match card display against Barcelona to celebrate Celtic's 125th anniversary. The display featured a Celtic cross, green and white hoops and 125 Celtic in written form, with supporters earning the praise of club chairman Peter Lawwell. They have however been criticised for some of their more controversial banners, such as the poppy protest banner in 2010.

Preceded by Football communities of Japan and Korea Republic	FIFA Fair Play Award Winners; 2003	Succeeded by Confederação Brasileira de Futebol
