= 2005–06 Celtic F.C. season =

Celtic F.C.
2005–06 season
- Chairman: Brian Quinn
- Manager: Gordon Strachan
- Ground: Celtic Park; Glasgow, Scotland (Capacity: 60,355)
- Scottish Premier League: 1st
- Scottish Cup: Third round
- Scottish League Cup: Winners
- Champions League: Second qualifying round
- Top goalscorer: League: John Hartson (18); All: John Hartson; Maciej Żurawski (20 each)
Home colours	Away colours	Third colours

Celtic started the season 2005–06 looking to win the Scottish Premier League trophy and retain the Scottish Cup. They competed in the Scottish League Cup, and entered the Champions League at the qualification stage.

Celtic were knocked out of the Scottish Cup in the third round by Clyde, losing 2–1. They won the Scottish League Cup with a comfortable 3–0 victory over Dunfermline on 19 March 2006, while the league was regained after a 1–0 win over Hearts. Rival managers were quick to praise the manner in which Celtic had regained the SPL title.

== Results ==
=== Scottish Premier League ===
30 July 2005 SPL	Motherwell	4–4	Celtic	Fir Park
	Kerr 20'; Hamilton 58'; McDonald 60'; Kinniburgh 84'	BBC Sport	Hartson 14', 32', 44' (pen.); Beattie 90+1'	Attendance: 9,903; Referee: Mike McCurry

6 August 2005 SPL	Celtic	2–0	Dundee United	Celtic Park
	Hartson 37'; Beattie 88'	BBC Sport		Attendance: 56,532; Referee: Iain Brines

13 August 2005 SPL	Celtic	3–1	Falkirk	Celtic Park
	Hartson 49'; Thompson 75', 90+1'	BBC Sport	Duffy 39' (pen.)	Attendance: 57,782; Referee: Alan Freeland

20 August 2005 SPL	Rangers	3–1	Celtic	Ibrox Stadium
	Pršo 34'; Buffel 51'; Novo 88' (pen.)	BBC Sport	Maloney 86' (pen.)	Attendance: 49,699; Referee: Stuart Dougal

28 August 2005 SPL	Dunfermline Athletic	0–4	Celtic	East End Park
		BBC Sport	Żurawski 5', 74'; Hartson 10'; Nakamura 58'	Attendance: 9,244; Referee: Kenny Clark

10 September 2005 SPL	Celtic	2–0	Aberdeen	Celtic Park
	Żurawski 13'; Petrov 61'	BBC Sport		Attendance: 59,607; Referee: Charlie Richmond

18 September 2005 SPL	Hibernian	0–1	Celtic	Easter Road
		BBC Sport	Petrov 5'	Attendance: 15,649; Referee: Craig Thomson

24 September 2005 SPL	Celtic	2–1	Inverness CT	Celtic Park
	Beattie 57', 67'	BBC Sport	Wyness 51'	Attendance: 57,247; Referee: Steve Conroy

1 October 2005 SPL	Livingston	0–5	Celtic	Almondvale Stadium
		BBC Sport	McManus 36'; Maloney 45'; Żurawski 51'; Sutton 62'; Beattie 72'	Attendance: 9,115; Referee: Mike McCurry

15 October 2005 SPL	Celtic	1–1	Hearts	Celtic Park
	Beattie 13'	BBC Sport	Skácel 16'	Attendance: 60,100; Referee: Dougie McDonald

22 October 2005 SPL	Kilmarnock	0–1	Celtic	Rugby Park
		BBC Sport	Petrov 24'	Attendance: 10,544; Referee: Iain Brines

26 October 2005 SPL	Celtic	5–0	Motherwell	Celtic Park
	Petrov 14', 23', 79'; Maloney 17'; Nakamura 67'	BBC Sport		Attendance: 57,388; Referee: Charlie Richmond

29 October 2005 SPL	Dundee United	2–4	Celtic	Tannadice Park
	Sutton 4' (o.g.); Samuel 30'	BBC Sport	Hartson 17'; Sutton 28'; Archibald 32' (o.g.); Pearson 88'	Attendance: 11,942; Referee: Alan Freeland

5 November 2005 SPL	Falkirk	0–3	Celtic	Falkirk Stadium
		BBC Sport	Maloney 41'; McGeady 42'; Hartson 69'	Attendance: 6,459; Referee: Calum Murray

19 November 2005 SPL	Celtic	3–0	Rangers	Celtic Park
	Hartson 12'; Baldé 56'; McGeady 61'	BBC Sport		Attendance: 58,997; Referee: Dougie McDonald

26 November 2005 SPL	Celtic	0–1	Dunfermline Athletic	Celtic Park
		BBC Sport	Ross 17'	Attendance: 58,203; Referee: Craig Mackay

3 December 2005 SPL	Aberdeen	1–3	Celtic	Pittodrie Stadium
	Winter 53'	BBC Sport	McGeady 56'; Petrov 58'; Telfer 64'	Attendance: 17,031; Referee: Charlie Richmond

10 December 2005 SPL	Celtic	3–2	Hibernian	Celtic Park
	Hartson 40', 65'; Maloney 57'	BBC Sport	Beuzelin 47'; Fletcher 53'	Attendance: 59,895; Referee: Kenny Clark

17 December 2005 SPL	Inverness CT	1–1	Celtic	Caledonian Stadium
	Dargo 1'	BBC Sport	Hartson 21'	Attendance: 7,382; Referee: Stuart Dougal

26 December 2005 SPL	Celtic	2–1	Livingston	Celtic Park
	Maloney 39' (pen.); Nakamura 87'	BBC Sport	Dalglish 58'	Attendance: 57,000; Referee: John Underhill

1 January 2006 SPL	Hearts	2–3	Celtic	Tynecastle Stadium
	Jankauskas 6'; Pressley 8'	BBC Sport	Pearson 55'; McManus 87', 90+3'	Attendance: 17,358; Referee: Iain Brines

14 January 2006 SPL	Celtic	4–2	Kilmarnock	Celtic Park
	Nakamura 3'; Maloney 16' (pen.); McManus 53'; Żurawski 67'	BBC Sport	Naismith 24' (pen.); Invincibile 51'	Attendance: 59,995; Referee: Calum Murray

22 January 2006 SPL	Motherwell	1–3	Celtic	Fir Park
	Hamilton 41'	BBC Sport	Żurawski 17'; McGeady 71'; Hartson 85'	Attendance: 11,503; Referee: Charlie Richmond

28 January 2006 SPL	Celtic	3–3	Dundee United	Celtic Park
	Hartson 9'; Żurawski 49'; Petrov 67'	BBC Sport	Fernández 40', 86'; Miller 82'	Attendance: 59,875; Referee: M Ritchie

8 February 2006 SPL	Celtic	2–1	Falkirk	Celtic Park
	Keane 34'; McManus 44'	BBC Sport	Milne 83'	Attendance: 56,672; Referee: Iain Brines

12 February 2006 SPL	Rangers	0–1	Celtic	Ibrox Stadium
		BBC Sport	Żurawski 12'	Attendance: 49,788; Referee: Mike McCurry

18 February 2006 SPL	Dunfermline Athletic	1–8	Celtic	East End Park
	Tod 14'	BBC Sport	Petrov 3'; Hartson 24'; Żurawski 32', 40', 56', 88'; Maloney 74'; Lennon 82'	Attendance: 9,015; Referee: Dougie McDonald

4 March 2006 SPL	Celtic	3–0	Aberdeen	Celtic Park
	Petrov 66'; Maloney 75'; Żurawski 89'	BBC Sport		Attendance: 60,018; Referee: Mike McCurry

11 March 2006 SPL	Hibernian	1–2	Celtic	Easter Road
	Riordan 24'	BBC Sport	Maloney 36' (pen.); McManus 60'	Attendance: 16,985; Referee: Alan Freeland

22 March 2006 SPL	Celtic	2–1	Inverness CT	Celtic Park
	McManus 35'; Maloney 79'	BBC Sport	Hart 90+1'	Attendance: 57,451; Referee: Charlie Richmond

26 March 2006 SPL	Livingston	0–2	Celtic	Almondvale Stadium
		BBC Sport	Żurawski 46'; Maloney 52' (pen.)	Attendance: 7,486; Referee: Kenny Clark

5 April 2006 SPL	Celtic	1–0	Hearts	Celtic Park
	Hartson 4'	BBC Sport		Attendance: 59,699; Referee: Dougie McDonald

9 April 2006 SPL	Kilmarnock	1–4	Celtic	Rugby Park
	Nish 89'	BBC Sport	Nakamura 8', 82'; Hartson 64'; Dublin 84'	Attendance: 10,978; Referee: Craig Thomson

16 April 2006 SPL	Celtic	1–1	Hibernian	Celtic Park
	Żurawski 76'	BBC Sport	Fletcher 35'	Attendance: 60,047; Referee: K Toner

23 April 2006 SPL	Celtic	0–0	Rangers	Celtic Park
		BBC Sport		Attendance: 59,684; Referee: Craig Thomson

30 April 2006 SPL	Hearts	3–0	Celtic	Tynecastle Stadium
	McManus 7' (o.g.); Hartley 9'; Bednář 63'	BBC Sport		Attendance: 16,795; Referee: Alan Freeland

3 May 2006 SPL	Celtic	2–0	Kilmarnock	Celtic Park
	Żurawski 55'; Varga 63'	BBC Sport		Attendance: 48,649; Referee: Steve Conroy

7 May 2006 SPL	Aberdeen	2–2	Celtic	Pittodrie Stadium
	Stewart 69', 72'	BBC Sport	Hartson 5'; Maloney 61'	Attendance: 14,597; Referee: Calum Murray

=== UEFA Champions League ===
27 July 2005 Second Qualifying	Artmedia Bratislava (Slovakia)	5–0	(Scotland) Celtic	Bratislava, Slovakia
	Halenár 43', 76', 89'; Vaščák 57'; Mikulič 78'	BBC Sport		Stadium: Tehelné pole Attendance: 17,262; Referee: Selçuk Dereli

2 August 2005 Second Qualifying	Celtic (Scotland)	4–0 (4–5 agg.)	(Slovakia) Artmedia Bratislava	Glasgow, Scotland
	Thompson 21' (pen.); Hartson 44'; McManus 54'; Beattie 82'	BBC Sport		Stadium: Celtic Park; Attendance: 50,063; Referee: Alberto Undiano Mallenco

=== Scottish League Cup ===
21 September 2005 Third round	Celtic	2–1	Falkirk	Celtic Park
	Żurawski 62'; Hartson 90+4'	BBC Sport	Gow 54'	Attendance: 24,953; Referee: Kenny Clark

9 November 2005 Quarter Final	Celtic	2–0	Rangers	Celtic Park
	Maloney 26'; Klos 82' (o.g.)	BBC Sport		Attendance: 57,183; Referee: Kenny Clark

1 February 2006 Semi Final	Motherwell	1–2	Celtic	Hampden Park
	Foran 11'	BBC Sport	Żurawski 29'; Maloney 88'	Attendance: 32,595; Referee: Craig Thomson

19 March 2006 Final	Dunfermline Athletic	0–3	Celtic	Hampden Park
		BBC Sport	Żurawski 43'; Maloney 76'; Dublin 90+2'	Attendance: 50,090; Referee: Stuart Dougal

=== Scottish Cup ===
7 January 2006 Third round	Clyde	2–1	Celtic	Broadwood Stadium
	Bryson 32'; Malone 36'	BBC Sport	Żurawski 82'	Attendance: 8,000; Referee: Kenny Clark

== Player statistics ==
=== Appearances and goals ===
List of squad players, including number of appearances by competition

No.	Pos	Nat	Player	Total		Premier League		FA Cup		League Cup		Other	
No.	Pos	Nat	Player	Apps	Goals	Apps	Goals	Apps	Goals	Apps	Goals	Apps	Goals
1	GK	(Poland) POL	Artur Boruc	40	0	34	0	1	0	4	0	1	0
2	DF	(Scotland) SCO	Paul Telfer	42	1	36	1	1	0	3	0	2	0
3	DF	(Guinea) GUI	Mohamed Camara	23	0	18	0	0	0	3	0	2	0
4	DF	(Scotland) SCO	Adam Virgo	12	0	3+7	0	0+1	0	1	0	0	0
5	DF	(China) CHN	Du Wei	1	0	0	0	1	0	0	0	0	0
6	DF	(Guinea) GUI	Dianbobo Balde	33	1	28	1	0	0	3	0	2	0
7	FW	(Poland) POL	Maciej Żurawski	30	20	22+2	16	0+1	1	3	3	2	0
8	MF	(England) ENG	Alan Thompson	19	3	11+5	2	0	0	0+1	0	2	1
9	FW	(England) ENG	Chris Sutton	10	2	7+1	2	0	0	1	0	1	0
9	FW	(England) ENG	Dion Dublin (from January)	12	2	3+8	1	0	0	0+1	1	0	0
10	FW	(Wales) WAL	John Hartson	41	20	29+6	18	1	0	2+1	1	2	1
11	MF	(Scotland) SCO	Stephen Pearson	20	2	2+16	2	1	0	0+1	0	0	0
12	DF	(Scotland) SCO	Mark Wilson	15	0	14+1	0	0	0	0	0	0	0
14	FW	(France) FRA	Jérémie Aliadière	2	0	0	0	0	0	0	0	0+2	0
16	MF	(Republic of Ireland) IRL	Roy Keane	13	1	10	1	1	0	1+1	0	0	0
17	DF	(France) FRA	Didier Agathe	4	0	0+4	0	0	0	0	0	0	0
18	MF	(Northern Ireland) NIR	Neil Lennon	38	1	32	1	1	0	3	0	2	0
19	MF	(Bulgaria) BUL	Stiliyan Petrov	43	10	36+1	10	0	0	4	0	2	0
22	GK	(Scotland) SCO	David Marshall	5	0	4	0	0	0	0	0	1	0
23	DF	(Slovakia) SVK	Stanislav Varga	13	1	9+1	1	0	0	1+1	0	1	0
25	MF	(Japan) JPN	Shunsuke Nakamura	38	6	30+3	6	1	0	4	0	0	0
29	FW	(Scotland) SCO	Shaun Maloney	43	16	27+9	13	1	0	4	3	0+2	0
33	MF	(Scotland) SCO	Ross Wallace	14	0	8+3	0	1	0	1	0	1	0
35	MF	(Scotland) SCO	Paul Lawson	4	0	1+2	0	0	0	0+1	0	0	0
37	FW	(Scotland) SCO	Craig Beattie	15	7	7+6	6	0	0	1	0	0+1	1
42	FW	(Scotland) SCO	Michael McGlinchey	1	0	0+1	0	0	0	0	0	0	0
44	DF	(Scotland) SCO	Stephen McManus	42	8	36	7	1	0	4	0	1	1
46	MF	(Republic of Ireland) IRL	Aiden McGeady	24	4	11+9	4	0+1	0	1+1	0	0+1	0

=== Goal scorers ===
R	Player	Scottish Premier League	Scottish League Cup	Scottish Cup	UEFA Champions League	Total
1	(Poland) Maciej Żurawski	16	3	1	0	20
1	(Wales) John Hartson	18	1	0	1	20
2	(Scotland) Shaun Maloney	13	3	0	0	16
3	(Bulgaria) Stiliyan Petrov	10	0	0	0	10
4	(Scotland) Stephen McManus	7	0	0	1	8
5	(Scotland) Craig Beattie	6	0	0	1	7
6	(Japan) Shunsuke Nakamura	6	0	0	0	6
7	(Republic of Ireland) Aiden McGeady	4	0	0	0	4
8	(England) Alan Thompson	2	0	0	1	3
9	(England) Chris Sutton	2	0	0	0	2
9	(Scotland) Stephen Pearson	2	0	0	0	2
9	(England) Dion Dublin	1	1	0	0	2
9	(Guinea) Bobo Balde	1	0	0	0	1
9	(Scotland) Paul Telfer	1	0	0	0	1
9	(Republic of Ireland) Roy Keane	1	0	0	0	1
9	(Northern Ireland) Neil Lennon	1	0	0	0	1
9	(Slovakia) Stanislav Varga	1	0	0	0	1

== Team statistics ==
=== League table ===
Pos	Team	Pld	W	D	L	GF	GA	GD	Pts	Qualification or relegation (Note: Teams played each other three times (33 matches), before the league split into two groups (the top six and the bottom six) for the last five matches.)
1	Celtic (C)	38	28	7	3	93	37	+56	91	Qualification for the Champions League group stage
2	Heart of Midlothian	38	22	8	8	71	31	+40	74	Qualification for the Champions League second qualifying round
3	Rangers	38	21	10	7	67	37	+30	73	Qualification for the UEFA Cup first round
4	Hibernian	38	17	5	16	61	56	+5	56	Qualification for the UEFA Intertoto Cup second round (Note: Hibernian qualified for the 2006 UEFA Intertoto Cup by being the highest place applicant for the competition.)
5	Kilmarnock	38	15	10	13	63	64	−1	55	

Source: Scottish Professional Football League
Rules for classification: 1) Points; 2) Goal difference; 3) Goals scored
(C) Champions

== Technical staff ==
Position	Staff
Manager	Gordon Strachan
Assistant Manager	Gary Pendrey
First Team Coach	Tommy Burns
Goalkeeping Coach	Jim Blyth
Head of Youth Academy	Tommy Burns
Head of Recruitment	Tom O'Neil
Head Physiotherapist	Tim Williamson
Physiotherapist	Gavin McCarthy
Doctor	Roddy MacDonald
Head of Sports Science	Kenny McMillan
Performance Coach	Jim Henry

Last updated: 12 June 2017

== Transfers ==
=== In ===
Date	Player	From	Fee
21 June 2005	(Guinea) Mohammed Camara	(England) Burnley	Free
1 July 2005	(France) Jérémie Aliadière	(England) Arsenal	Loan
7 July 2005	(Poland) Maciej Żurawski	(Poland) Wisła Kraków	£2,000,000
13 July 2005	(Poland) Artur Boruc	(Poland) Legia Warsaw	Loan
20 July 2005	(Scotland) Adam Virgo	(England) Brighton & Hove Albion	£1,500,000
22 July 2005	(Scotland) Paul Telfer	(England) Southampton	£150,000
29 July 2005	(Japan) Shunsuke Nakamura	(Italy) Reggina	£2,500,000
1 September 2005	(China) Du Wei	(China) Shanghai Shenhua	Loan
17 October 2005	(Poland) Artur Boruc	(Poland) Legia Warsaw	£750,000
15 December 2005	(Republic of Ireland) Roy Keane	(England) Manchester United	Free
16 January 2006	(Scotland) Mark Wilson	(Scotland) Dundee United	£500,000
30 January 2006	(England) Dion Dublin	(England) Leicester City	Free

=== Out ===
Date	Player	To	Fee
1 June 2005	(Guinea) Mohammed Sylla	(England) Leicester City	Free
1 June 2005	(Scotland) Paul Lambert	(Scotland) Livingston	Retired
6 June 2005	(Scotland) Robert Douglas	(England) Leicester City	Free
14 June 2005	(Scotland) Jackie McNamara	(England) Wolverhampton Wanderers	Free
17 June 2005	(Belgium) Joos Valgaeren	(Belgium) Club Brugge	Free
5 July 2005	(Denmark) Ulrik Laursen	(Denmark) Odense BK	£50,000
21 July 2005	(Sweden) Magnus Hedman	Released	Free
26 July 2005	(Switzerland) Stéphane Henchoz	(England) Wigan Athletic	Free
12 August 2005	(Spain) David Fernández	(Scotland) Dundee United	Free
25 August 2005	(France) Jérémie Aliadière	(England) West Ham United	End of loan
5 January 2006	(England) Chris Sutton	(England) Birmingham City	Free
5 January 2006	(Scotland) Charlie Mulgrew	(Scotland) Dundee United	Loan
19 January 2006	(China) Du Wei	(China) Shanghai Shenhua	End of loan
1 February 2006	(France) Didier Agathe	Released	Free

- Expenditure: ▼£7,400,000
- Income: ▲£50,000
- Total loss/gain: ▼£7,350,000

== See also ==
- List of Celtic F.C. seasons
