= 2003 UEFA Cup final =

- Event: 2002–03 UEFA Cup
Celtic	Porto
(Scotland)	(Portugal)
2	3
- After extra time
- Date: 21 May 2003
- Venue: Estadio Olímpico de Sevilla, Seville
- Man of the Match: Derlei (Porto)
- Referee: Ľuboš Micheľ (Slovakia)
- Attendance: 52,140

The 2003 UEFA Cup final was played on 21 May 2003 between Celtic of Scotland and Porto of Portugal. Porto won the match 3–2 in extra time thanks to a goal from Derlei.

Before this game, no club from Scotland or Portugal had won the UEFA Cup.

The game had what UEFA described as "the largest travelling support to have assembled for a single game" – around 80,000 Celtic fans travelled to Seville for the final. For this turnout and the manner in which they conducted themselves, Celtic fans have been nicknamed "The Bhoys from Seville" and received an award from FIFA and UEFA, winning the FIFA Fair Play Award that year and being presented with a formal recognition from UEFA at a home match the following season.

== Route to the final ==
Note: In all results below, the score of the finalist is given first (H: home; A: away).

(Scotland) Celtic				Round	(Portugal) Porto			
Champions League					UEFA Cup			
Opponent	Agg.	1st leg	2nd leg	Qualifying rounds	Opponent	Agg.	1st leg	2nd leg
(Switzerland) Basel	3–3 (a)	3–1 (H)	0–2 (A)	Third qualifying round	N/A			
UEFA Cup					N/A			
(Lithuania) Sūduva	10–1	8–1 (H)	2–0 (A)	First round	(Poland) Polonia Warsaw	6–2	6–0 (H)	0–2 (A)
(England) Blackburn Rovers	3–0	1–0 (H)	2–0 (A)	Second round	Austria Wien	3–0	1–0 (A)	2–0 (H)
(Spain) Celta Vigo	2–2 (a)	1–0 (H)	1–2 (A)	Third round	(France) Lens	3–1	3–0 (H)	0–1 (A)
(Germany) VfB Stuttgart	5–4	3–1 (H)	2–3 (A)	Fourth round	(Turkey) Denizlispor	8–3	6–1 (H)	2–2 (A)
(England) Liverpool	3–1	1–1 (H)	2–0 (A)	Quarter-finals	(Greece) Panathinaikos	2–1 (a.e.t.)	0–1 (H)	2–0 (A)
(Portugal) Boavista	2–1	1–1 (H)	1–0 (A)	Semi-finals	(Italy) Lazio	4–1	4–1 (H)	0–0 (A)

== Pre-match ==
The game was played at Estadio Olímpico de Sevilla on 21 May with kick-off at 20:45 local time. A team of officials was selected from Slovakia.

== Match ==
=== Summary ===
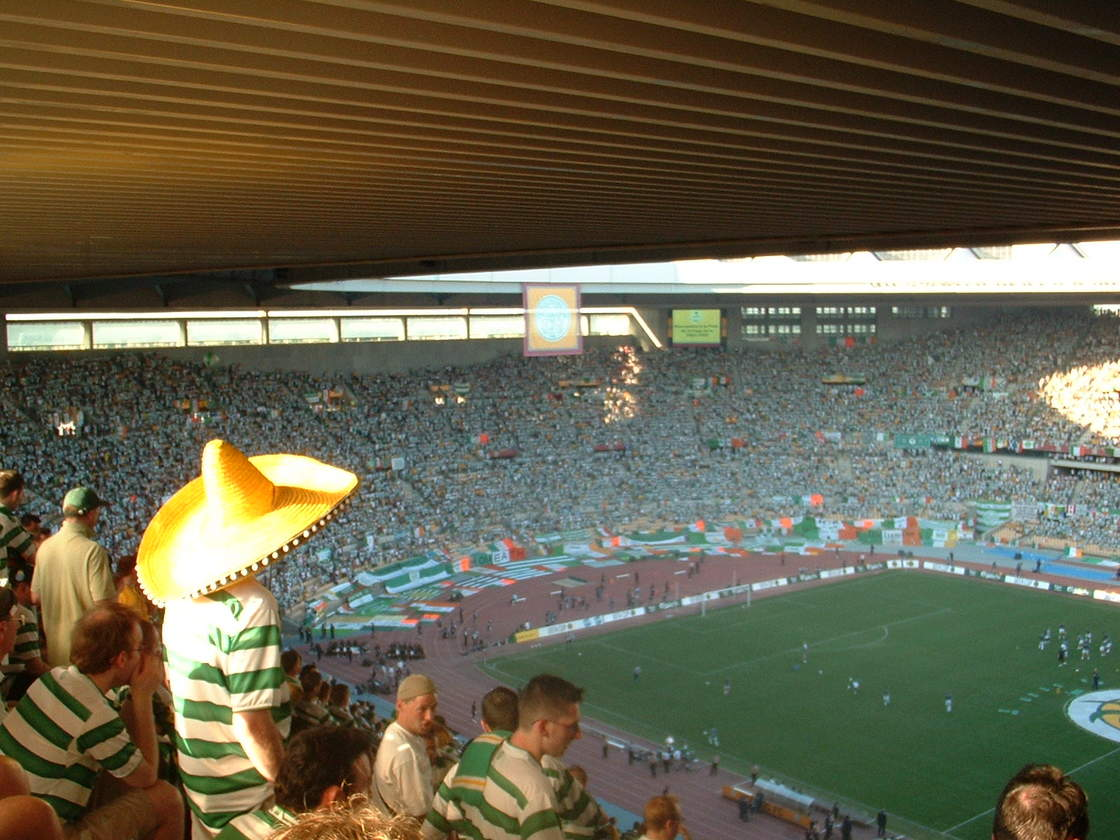
Celtic fans in the stadium

A rash challenge led to Joos Valgaeren of Celtic getting a yellow card in the eighth minute. After this it was a stoic affair, until 32 minutes into the first half when Capucho played in Deco, but he could do no more than fire his shot straight at Rab Douglas. Straight after this attack, Celtic broke on the counter with Henrik Larsson putting Didier Agathe through on the right but his cross was too high for Chris Sutton. Larsson had a chance to make it 1–0 in the 35th minute but was unable to get enough contact on the ball. Porto came close in the 41st minute when Deco moved past Bobo Baldé to go one on one with Douglas, who saved Deco's shot with his legs.

Porto found a way through on the stroke of half-time. After some great work from Deco, Dmitri Alenichev's shot was parried by Douglas and Derlei slotted the ball in to give Porto a 1–0 lead. It was his 11th goal of the competition. Porto's lead did not last long after the restart as Celtic equalised after 47 minutes when Larsson met Agathe's cross to direct a looping header in over the helpless Vítor Baía to get his tenth goal of the tournament and his 200th Celtic goal. Within five minutes, it was 2–1 when Deco evaded a tackle and slipped a through ball to Alenichev who converted the cross.

Three minutes later, Celtic levelled once again. Larsson took advantage of poor marking when he powerfully headed in Alan Thompson's corner. With Deco remaining a consistent threat, Martin O'Neill brought on Jackie McNamara in 76 minutes to nullify Deco's threat. In the 80th minute, Bobo Baldé picked up a yellow card. A couple of minutes from time, McNamara's errant pass found Alenichev, but he could not find the target and shot over.

Normal time ended with the game at 2–2. Extra time would be played under the silver goal rule, whereby the team leading at the end of the first half of extra time would win the match.

Celtic were reduced to ten men in the 96th minute when Baldé was dismissed after collecting his second yellow card. O'Neill reconfigured his team by moving McNamara back to fill the gap in defence caused by Baldé's dismissal.

The first half of extra time arrived without a change in the score, so the silver goal rule did not apply.

In the second half of extra time Celtic were unable to hold out for penalties, as Derlei reacted quickest to a Douglas block in the 115th minute and rounded McNamara to make it 3–2. Porto had Nuno Valente sent off in the last minute but no further goals meant that they had ended their 16-year wait for a further European trophy.

=== Details ===
21 May 2003
20:45 UTC+2

Celtic (Scotland)	2–3 (a.e.t.)	(Portugal) Porto
Larsson 47', 57'	Report	Derlei 45+1', 115'; Alenichev 54'

Estadio Olímpico de Sevilla, Seville
Attendance: 52,140
Referee: Ľuboš Micheľ (Slovakia)

Celtic	Porto

GK	20	(Scotland) Rab Douglas
CB	35	(Sweden) Johan Mjällby
CB	6	(Guinea) Bobo Baldé	(yellow card) 80' (yellow-red card) 96'
CB	5	(Belgium) Joos Valgaeren	(yellow card) 8'	(substituted off) 64'
DM	14	(Scotland) Paul Lambert (c)		(substituted off) 76'
RM	17	(France) Didier Agathe
CM	19	(Bulgaria) Stiliyan Petrov	(yellow card) 102'	(substituted off) 105'
CM	18	(Northern Ireland) Neil Lennon	(yellow card) 59'
LM	8	(England) Alan Thompson
CF	9	(England) Chris Sutton
CF	7	(Sweden) Henrik Larsson
Substitutes:
GK	21	(Sweden) Magnus Hedman
DF	4	(Scotland) Jackie McNamara		(substituted on) 76'
DF	16	(Denmark) Ulrik Laursen		(substituted on) 64'
MF	3	(Guinea) Mohammed Sylla
MF	39	(Scotland) Jamie Smith
FW	12	(Spain) David Fernández
FW	29	(Scotland) Shaun Maloney		(substituted on) 105'
Manager:
(Northern Ireland) Martin O'Neill

GK	99	(Portugal) Vítor Baía
RB	22	(Portugal) Paulo Ferreira
CB	2	(Portugal) Jorge Costa (c)		(substituted off) 71'
CB	4	(Portugal) Ricardo Carvalho
LB	8	(Portugal) Nuno Valente	(yellow card) 63' (yellow-red card) 120+3'
DM	6	(Portugal) Costinha		(substituted off) 9'
CM	15	(Russia) Dmitri Alenichev
CM	18	(Portugal) Maniche	(yellow card) 120'
AM	10	(Portugal) Deco
CF	21	(Portugal) Capucho		(substituted off) 98'
CF	11	(Brazil) Derlei	(yellow card) 116'
Substitutes:
GK	13	(Portugal) Nuno
DF	3	(Portugal) Pedro Emanuel		(substituted on) 71'
DF	5	(Portugal) Ricardo Costa		(substituted on) 9'
DF	14	(Portugal) César Peixoto
MF	28	(Brazil) Clayton
MF	66	(Portugal) Tiago
FW	78	(Portugal) Marco Ferreira	(yellow card) 120'	(substituted on) 98'
Manager:
(Portugal) José Mourinho

Man of the Match:
Derlei (Porto)

Assistant referees:
Igor Šramka (Slovakia)
Martin Balko (Slovakia)
Fourth official:
Anton Stredák (Slovakia)

Match rules

- 90 minutes
- 30 minutes of silver goal extra time if necessary
- Penalty shoot-out if scores still equal
- Seven named substitutes
- Maximum of three substitutions

First half
Statistic	Celtic	Porto
Goals scored	0	1
Total shots	2	7
Shots on target	1	7
Ball possession	43%	57%
Corner kicks	1	3
Fouls committed	13	6
Offsides	0	0
Yellow cards	1	0
Red cards	0	0

Second half and extra time
Statistic	Celtic	Porto
Goals scored	2	2
Total shots	4	8
Shots on target	2	4
Ball possession	45%	55%
Corner kicks	4	2
Fouls committed	20	18
Offsides	4	2
Yellow cards	4	5
Red cards	1	1

Overall
Statistic	Celtic	Porto
Goals scored	2	3
Total shots	6	15
Shots on target	3	11
Ball possession	44%	56%
Corner kicks	5	5
Fouls committed	33	24
Offsides	4	2
Yellow cards	5	5
Red cards	1	1

== See also ==
- 2003 UEFA Champions League final
- 2003 UEFA Super Cup
- Celtic F.C. in international football
- FC Porto in international football
- The Bhoys from Seville
- 2002–03 Celtic F.C. season
- 2002–03 FC Porto season
