= Bobo Baldé =

Guinean footballer and manager (born 1975)

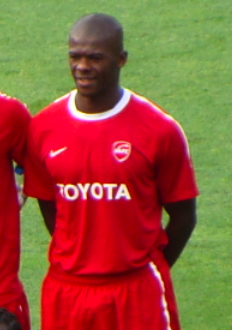
- Baldé with Valenciennes in July 2010

Personal information
- Full name: Dianbobo Baldé
- Date of birth: 5 October 1975 (age 51)
- Place of birth: Marseille, France
- Height: 1.96 m (6 ft 5 in)
- Position: Defender

Youth career
- CA Gombertois

Senior career*
Years	Team	Apps	(Gls)
1995–1999	Marseille	0	(0)
1997–1998	→ Mulhouse (loan)	33	(1)
1998–1999	→ Cannes (loan)	29	(4)
1999–2001	Toulouse	52	(1)
2001–2009	Celtic	161	(9)
2009–2011	Valenciennes	25	(1)
2011–2013	Arles-Avignon	40	(0)
Total		340	(16)

International career
2002–2012	Guinea	67	(2)

Managerial career
- 2014–2016: CA Gombertois (player-assistant)
- 2016–2019: CA Gombertois (assistant)
- 2019–2021: Guinea U20
- * Club domestic league appearances and goals

Dianbobo "Bobo" Baldé (born 5 October 1975) is a former professional footballer who played as a defender.

He played for Mulhouse, Cannes, Toulouse, Celtic, Valenciennes and Arles-Avignon. Born in France, Baldé was a Guinean international and represented them 52 times scoring two goals.

== Club career ==
=== Early career ===
Baldé started his career in 1995 at centre back for Marseille, where he stayed until 1997 but could not make the first-team breakthrough, so he had to leave his hometown club to join second division outfit Mulhouse for the 1997–98 season, staying only that year. When Mulhouse were relegated, he joined Cannes on loan in 1998, where he had little success in the league, making 29 appearances and scoring four goals. He left Marseille, moving to Toulouse, whom he helped to promotion during the 1999–00 season. In total, he made 52 league appearances for Toulouse, scoring one goal.

=== Celtic ===
Baldé signed for Celtic on 21 July 2001 and became a regular player in Celtic's team. Baldé made 232 appearances (51 as a sub) during his spell as a Hoops' player.

He made his debut on 8 September in a 3–1 win at home to Dunfermline Athletic. Four SPL games later, he scored his first Celtic goal on 20 October 2001 against Dundee United at Celtic Park. In that entire season Baldé scored a total of six goals, including one in the Scottish Cup final against Rangers, when he rose above Lorenzo Amoruso to score from a Neil Lennon free kick from six yards in the 50th minute. Celtic lost that game 3–2. Baldé also scored in the League Cup semi-final defeat to Rangers.

Baldé scored his first goal of the 2002–03 season on 1 September 2002 against Livingston. He was booked in the first Old Firm game of the season which ended 3–3 but at the end of the season Baldé was subsequently voted the Celtic Player of The Year for 2003 by the Celtic fans in which 40,000 Celtic fans voted. He was the inaugural winner of that award. In his acceptance speech, he paid tribute to his teammates and manager Martin O'Neill. Speaking just after winning the award, Baldé said: "It means a lot to win this award. It's good to know the fans are behind you and they are happy with what you do for them". He also won the Player of The Month Award for April. He played in 12 of Celtic's 13 UEFA Cup games in that season, where Celtic got to the final. In the final they played against Porto at the Olympic Stadium in Seville. During the final, Baldé was sent off in the 95th minute after picking up his second booking. Celtic lost that final 3–2, with Henrik Larsson getting both of Celtic's goals.

In the 2003–04 season, Baldé's first goal came against Dundee in the fifth SPL game of the season. In the next game, he received a red card in the 70th minute. Throughout that season, he received seven yellow cards and one red card. He scored two goals that season, both against Dundee. At the end of the season, Baldé added a League Championship and a Scottish Cup medal to his collection.

A Dundee fan was convicted of racially abusing Baldé during a match at Dens Park in March 2004. A businessman named Russell Smith, he was banned for life from Kilmarnock's home ground of Rugby Park after shouting racial abuse at Baldé from the directors box in October 2004, while Motherwell supporters had targeted Baldé in October 2001.

Baldé started the 2004–05 season one yellow card in the first six games of the season (all competitions) and a goal in the 38th minute in the 8–1 defeat of Falkirk in the first League Cup game of the season. Within his first ten games of the season, he had received two yellow cards. In Europe, Celtic lost the first three games of the season. His scored two goals in a 3–0 win at home to Dundee on 2 March 2005. At the end of that season he added a Scottish Cup medal to his tally after Celtic beat Dundee United 1–0 in the final.

His fifth season and first season under new manager Gordon Strachan started with criticism in a pre-season match against Leicester City, for a challenge on 17-year-old James Wesolowski described as "..disgraceful, it was disgusting, it was malicious and it was intentional" by then Leicester manager Craig Levein. In the first competitive game, Celtic lost 5–0 to Artmedia Bratislava in the first leg of a Champions League qualifier, with Baldé getting booked. He was heavily criticised for his performance and dropped for Celtic's next game, a league match away at Motherwell. He returned for the second leg of the Champions League qualifier; Celtic won 4–0 but went out on aggregate. Baldé kept his place in the side and scored a header from a Shunsuke Nakamura cross in Celtic's 3–0 win over Rangers in November 2005. He finished the season with two further honours; the League Cup and the Scottish Premier League. Over the course of the season he scored one goal and received seven yellow cards.

Baldé missed the start of the 2006–07 season after discovering he required surgery for a persistent stomach muscle problem. He returned to the first team in November, only to suffer a broken leg in a match on Boxing Day. The Guinea international was carried off in the first half during the 2–2 draw with Dundee United. He was ruled out for several months.

In July 2007, before the start of the new season, Roy Keane, manager of Sunderland, showed interest in Baldé. Keane was reported to have made a £1.5 million offer for his former Celtic teammate. "I love the club, I am very settled in Glasgow with my girlfriend and I would be happy to fulfil my current contract", said Baldé. In October 2007, Baldé expressed a desire to leave Celtic, stating: "I don't want to be at a club where I am not wanted, but I want to make clear it is rubbish to say I am just taking the money... I have been told that I am not in the top two defenders and that I am down to sixth on the list. The manager and Peter (Lawwell, Chief Executive) told me this". Baldé was now completely out of contention for a first team place and only made his first start of the 2007–08 season on 26 December 2007, exactly a year after his last appearance, in a 2–0 away win to Dundee United. His presence also helped Celtic to their first away clean sheet in almost 15 months and he was awarded Man Of The Match. Baldé dropped out of the first team again after that, then got injured in early when playing for Guinea at the Africa Cup of Nations. Baldé was on the bench against Rangers on 29 March 2008, the first time since Christmas he had been selected after recovering from the injury he sustained at the Africa Cup of Nations. He then started a few days later replacing the suspended Gary Caldwell to make his first appearance since December 2007, with a man of the match performance in the 1–0 win over Aberdeen in the SPL, Georgios Samaras scored the only goal of the game.

At the start of the 2008–09 season, it was announced that Baldé would be allowed to leave Celtic on a free transfer, provided that he could find a club that would meet his salary demands. In the pre-season matches before the 2008–09 season, Baldé played in the last 13 minutes against Southampton and the last 30 minutes against Middlesbrough in the Algarve Challenge Cup. He made his first full appearance in Celtic's second Algarve Challenge Cup match against Cardiff City, which was the first meeting of the two teams in 81 years. He also took part in Celtic's 1–0 pre-season friendly win over Porto, in which he played the last 22 minutes. Baldé remained at Celtic until the summer of 2009, seeing out his contract in full, but did not play in any competitive games.

During his time at Celtic, he won five League Titles, three Scottish Cups and two Scottish League Cups and was part of the Celtic squad which reached the 2003 UEFA Cup Final. Looking back on his Celtic career, he said: "Celtic was a great adventure for me in my career. We reached the UEFA Cup Final, were league champions five times and won several Scottish and League Cups, There were a lot of great matches in the Champions League and I'm very happy with the experience I had at such a fantastic club and stadium."

On 8 September 2013, Baldé returned to Celtic to play for the "Celtic XI" during their Stiliyan Petrov charity match.

=== Valenciennes ===
In October 2009, Baldé signed up with French Ligue 1 club Valenciennes.

=== Arles ===
On 11 January 2011, it was announced that the remainder of Baldé's contract with Valenciennes was to be cancelled to allow him to join Arles-Avignon, playing in Ligue 2.

== International career ==
Born in Marseille, Baldé was called up to the Guinea national team for the 2002 African Cup of Nations. He was also part of their 2004 Cup of nations team, who finished second in their group in the first round of competition, before losing in the quarter-finals to Mali, and was a regular in 2006 FIFA World Cup qualifying. With Baldé on board, Guinea have also made it to the last eight in the 2004, 2006 and 2008 Africa Cup of Nations.

== Coaching and later career ==
His first job off the pitch started in April 2013, where Baldé was hired as a sports coordinator for the national team of Guinea. In July 2014, Baldé returned to football, signing with his former youth club Gombertois as a playing assistant manager. He left the position in September 2019, where he was appointed manager of Guinea's national U20 team.

== Personal life ==
Baldé younger half-brother, Yasser, is also a professional footballer in France.

== Career statistics ==
=== Club ===
Appearances and goals by club, season and competition
Club	Season	League			Cup		Europe		Total	
Club	Season	Division	Apps	Goals	Apps	Goals	Apps	Goals	Apps	Goals
Marseille B	1994–95	CFA	12	0	–		–		12	0
Marseille B	1995–96	CFA	21	0	–		–		21	0
Marseille B	1996–97	CFA	30	1	–		–		30	1
Marseille B	Total		63	1	0	0	0	0	63	1
Mulhouse	1997–98	Ligue 2	33	1	0	0	0	0	33	1
Cannes	1998–99	Ligue 2	29	4	1	0	0	0	30	4
Toulouse	1999–00	Ligue 2	28	0	5	0	0	0	33	0
Toulouse	2000–01	Ligue 1	24	1	1	0	0	0	25	1
Toulouse	Total		52	1	6	0	0	0	58	1
Celtic	2001–02	Scottish Premier League	21	2	8	4	8	0	37	6
Celtic	2002–03	Scottish Premier League	36	2	3	2	14	0	53	4
Celtic	2003–04	Scottish Premier League	31	2	5	0	14	0	50	2
Celtic	2004–05	Scottish Premier League	34	2	7	1	5	0	46	3
Celtic	2005–06	Scottish Premier League	28	1	3	0	2	0	33	1
Celtic	2006–07	Scottish Premier League	6	0	2	0	2	0	10	0
Celtic	2007–08	Scottish Premier League	4	0	0	0	0	0	4	0
Celtic	2008–09	Scottish Premier League	0	0	0	0	0	0	0	0
Celtic	Total		160	9	28	7	45	0	233	16
Valenciennes	2009–10	Ligue 1	10	1	0	0	0	0	10	1
Valenciennes	2010–11	Ligue 1	15	0	3	0	0	0	18	0
Valenciennes	Total		25	1	3	0	0	0	28	1
Arles-Avignon	2010–11	Ligue 1	13	0	0	0	0	0	13	0
Arles-Avignon	2011–12	Ligue 2	27	0	1	0	0	0	28	0
Arles-Avignon	Total		40	0	1	0	0	0	41	0
Career total			402	17	39	7	45	0	486	24

=== International ===
Appearances and goals by national team and year
National team	Year	Apps	Goals
Guinea	2000	1	1
Guinea	2001	0	0
Guinea	2002	2	0
Guinea	2003	3	0
Guinea	2004	11	0
Guinea	2005	3	0
Guinea	2006	4	0
Guinea	2007	2	0
Guinea	2008	11	0
Guinea	2009	6	0
Guinea	2010	1	0
Guinea	2011	6	1
Guinea	2012	6	0
Total		56	2

Score and result list Guinea's goal tally first, score column indicates score after Baldé goal.

International goal scored by Bobo Baldé
No.	Date	Venue	Opponent	Score	Result	Competition
1	8 October 2000	Stade du 28 Septembre, Conakry, Guinea	Senegal	1–0	1–0	2002 African Cup of Nations qualification
2	4 September 2011	Stade du 28 Septembre, Conakry, Guinea	Ethiopia	1–0	1–0	2012 Africa Cup of Nations qualification

== Honours ==
Celtic

- Scottish Premier League (5): 2001–02, 2003–04, 2005–06, 2006–07, 2007–08
- Scottish Cup (3): 2003–04, 2004–05, 2006–07
- Scottish League Cup (2): 2005–06, 2008–09
- UEFA Cup runner-up: 2002–03

Guinea

- Amílcar Cabral Cup: 2005

Individual

- Celtic Player of the Year: 2002–03
- SPL Player of the Month: April 2003
