= Ross Harris (footballer) =

Scottish footballer

Personal information
- Date of birth: 16 April 1985 (age 41)
- Place of birth: Glasgow, Scotland
- Position: Midfielder

Youth career
- 2005–2006: Celtic

Senior career*
Years	Team	Apps	(Gls)
2006–2007	Dundee	16	(1)
2007–2008	Stirling Albion	17	(0)
2008–2009	Albion Rovers	21	(3)
- * Club domestic league appearances and goals as of 12:31, 19 September 2010 (UTC)

Ross Harris (born 16 April 1985) is a Scottish former footballer.

He previously played for Celtic, where he did not make any first team appearances, and Dundee, and Stirling Albion in August 2007. He joined Albion Rovers in August 2008 and played for them for one season.
