= Joos Valgaeren =

Belgian footballer

Personal information
- Date of birth: 3 March 1976 (age 50)
- Place of birth: Leuven, Belgium
- Height: 1.92 m (6 ft 4 in)
- Position: Defender

Youth career
- 1985–1987: Serskamp
- 1987–1993: Verbroedering Geel

Senior career*
Years	Team	Apps	(Gls)
1993–1994	Verbroedering Geel	20	(0)
1994–1997	Mechelen	62	(1)
1997–2000	Roda JC	58	(7)
2000–2005	Celtic	116	(7)
2005–2008	Club Brugge	29	(0)
2008–2010	FC Emmen	18	(0)
Total		303	(15)

International career
1992–1994	Belgium U18	7	(0)
1993–1994	Belgium U19	2	(0)
1995–1997	Belgium U21	8	(0)
1997–2003	Belgium	19	(0)
- * Club domestic league appearances and goals

Joos Valgaeren (Dutch pronunciation: [ˈjoːs fɑlˈɣaːrə(n)]; (Note: In isolation, Valgaeren is pronounced [vɑlˈɣaːrə(n)].) born 3 March 1976) is a Belgian former international professional footballer who played as a defender. His former clubs include Club Brugge in Belgium, Roda JC and FC Emmen in the Netherlands, and Celtic in Scotland. His most successful spell was his time at Celtic, where he won three league titles and was part of the side that reached the 2003 UEFA Cup final.

He also played for his country, and was in the Belgian squad for UEFA Euro 2000 where he played in all three group games.

== Club career ==
Born and raised in Leuven, Joos Valgaeren started his career at amateur side Serskamp in his home town. He then moved to K.F.C. Verbroedering Geel where he proved to be a sturdy and consistent centre-back, as well as a composed full-back in the club's youth squad. After a number of years at Geel he left for Eerste Klasse side KV Mechelen in 1994. At the age of 21 Valgaeren moved to Dutch Eredivisie club Roda JC where he broke into the first-team in his second season. His competent displays for Roda JC earned him a call up to the Belgium squad by manager Georges Leekens in late 1997. After a lengthy spell out with a cruciate knee ligament injury, Valgaeren went on to have an outstanding season at Roda, winning his first major honour on 21 May 2000 when Roda beat NEC 2–0 in the 2000 Dutch Cup Final. Before he left the club the media had linked him with big-money moves to Ajax and Bayern Munich.

Celtic manager Martin O'Neill signed Valgaeren in 2000 from Roda JC for an undisclosed fee, said to be around £4.8 million. He was an instant success at Celtic and helped Celtic win a domestic treble in his first season in Glasgow. During O'Neill's first three years at Celtic, Valgaeren was first choice in a three-man defence consisting of himself, Johan Mjällby and Bobo Baldé. He played regularly in Europe, scoring in a 4–3 win at Celtic Park against Juventus in the 2001–02 Champions League campaign, and was part of the Celtic side that reached the 2003 UEFA Cup final. However, Valgaren struggled with injuries in his later years at Celtic and did not play regularly. When Gordon Strachan took over as Celtic manager in the summer of 2005, he was released on a free transfer after five years at the club in which he made over 100 appearances for. His final appearance for the club was the 2005 Scottish Cup final.

In June 2005 Valgaeren returned to Belgium to sign for Club Brugge on a free transfer from Celtic. On 26 May 2007, Valgaeren played in the Brugge side that defeated Standard Liège 1–0 to win the Belgian Cup. He made over 35 appearances for Club Brugge. In 2008, he signed a two-year contract at FC Emmen for the seasons 2008–09 and 2009–10 with an option for another year. He got a lot trouble with injuries and during the season 2009–10 he stopped playing professional football in November 2009.

On 8 September 2013, Valgaeren appeared for the "Celtic XI" during the Stiliyan Petrov charity match put on by Celtic FC.

== International career ==
Valgaeren made his debut for Belgium in 1997 in a friendly match against Austria at the King Baudouin Stadium in Brussels. After an outstanding club season in 1999–2000, he was named in Robert Waseige's 23-man squad for the 2000 European Football Championships and played in all three group games. He went on to help Belgium qualify for the 2002 FIFA World Cup but missed out on the tournament itself because of injury.

== Honours ==
Roda JC

- KNVB Cup: 2000

Celtic

- Scottish Premier League: 2000–01, 2001–02, 2003–04
- Scottish Cup: 2000–01, 2003–04, 2004–05
- Scottish League Cup: 2000–01
- UEFA Cup (runner up): 2003

Club Brugge

- Belgian Cup: 2007
