= FIFA Fair Play Award =

International football award

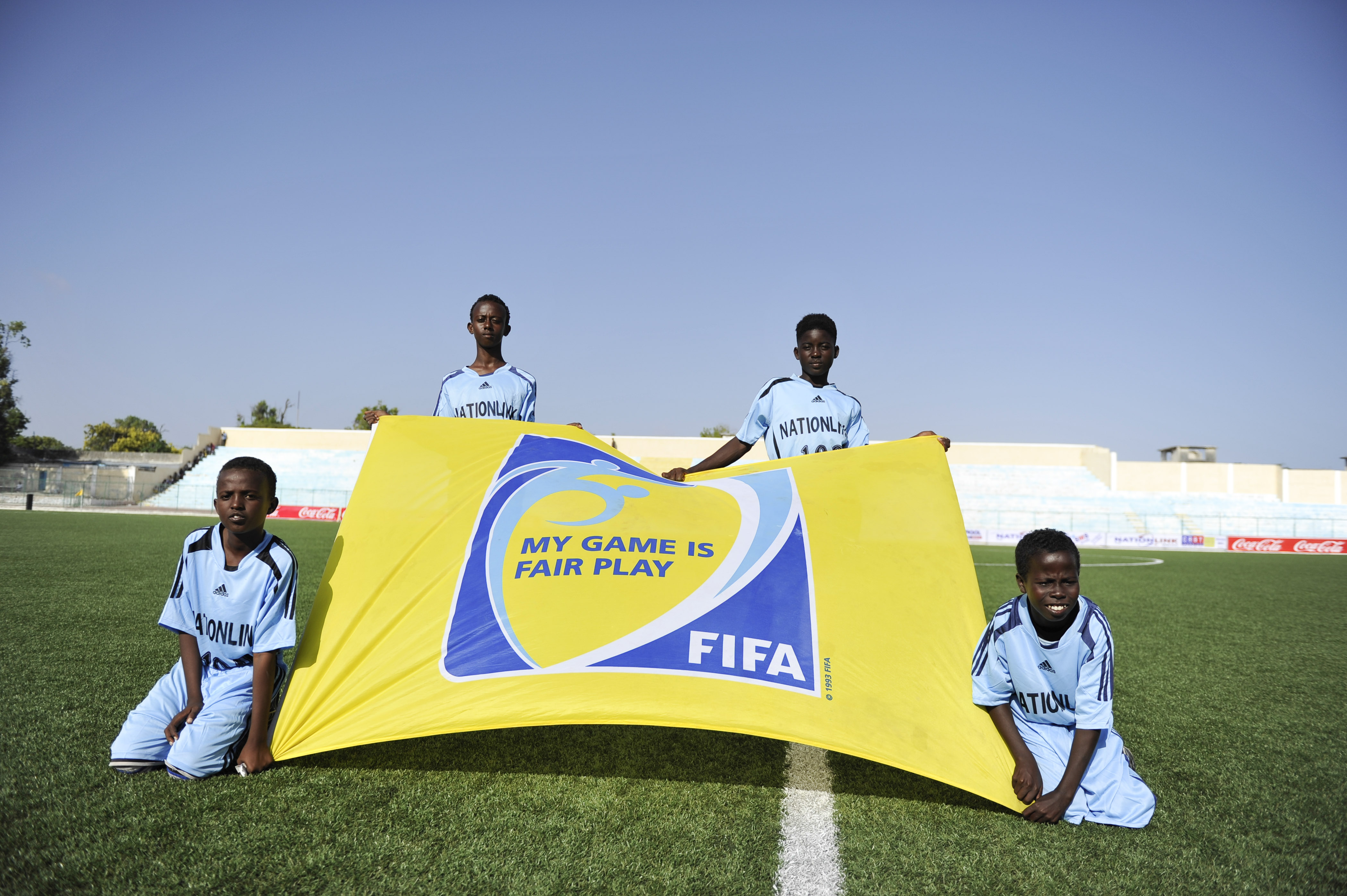
Ball boys in Banadir Stadium, Somalia, holding a FIFA Fair Play banner.

The FIFA Fair Play Award is a FIFA recognition of exemplary behaviour that promotes the spirit of fair play and compassion in association football around the world. First awarded in 1987, it has been presented to individuals (including posthumously), teams, fans, spectators, football associations/federations and even entire footballing communities. One or more awards are presented annually, with there being at least one recipient each year except in 1994, when no award was presented.

== Winners ==
Year	Winners	Reason	Ref
1987	(Scotland) Dundee United's fans	Fans' good behaviour towards winners IFK Göteborg in the UEFA Cup final.	
1988	(Germany) Frank Ordenewitz	Sporting behaviour in admitting handball in a penalty situation in a match between 1. FC Köln and Werder Bremen.	^{[b]}
1988	(South Korea) Spectators of the 1988 Seoul Olympic football tournament	Fans leaving a lasting impression with their sporting and composed behaviour.	
1989	(Trinidad and Tobago) Trinidadian and Tobagonian supporters	Sporting behaviour despite home loss to the United States in their final match in the 1989 CONCACAF Championship.	
1990	(England) Gary Lineker	Entire 16-year career as a professional football player without a yellow or red card.	
1991	Royal Spanish Football Federation	Exemplary way the government, media, schools, artists and sponsors were all involved in fair play activities.	
1991	(Brazil) Jorginho	Unique career and model behaviour both on and off the field.	
1992	Royal Belgian Football Association	Promoting fair play with its campaign "Football in Peace" and aid project "Casa Hogar" in Toluca, Mexico.	
1993	(Hungary) Nándor Hidegkuti	Honoured for his model behaviour as a player and coach.	
1993	Football Association of Zambia	Efforts of the reconstituted national team in the wake of 1993 Zambia national team air disaster.	
1994	Not awarded		
1995	(France) Jacques Glassmann	Courageous attitude as whistleblower in the Valenciennes and Marseille bribery case.	
1996	(Liberia) George Weah	Demonstrating his true love for the game and projecting the message of Fair Play to the widest possible public.	
1997	(Republic of Ireland) Irish supporters	Exemplary behaviour, especially during the World Cup preliminary match against Belgium.	^{[l]}
1997	(Slovakia) Jozef Žovinec (Slovak amateur player)	60 years of amateur football without receiving a yellow card.	^{[l]}
1997	(United States) Julie Foudy	Efforts against child labour.	^{[l]}
1998	United States Soccer Federation	Sportsmanship surrounding their 1998 FIFA World Cup match, despite mutual political tensions for nearly 20 years.	
1998	Football Federation Islamic Republic of Iran	Sportsmanship surrounding their 1998 FIFA World Cup match, despite mutual political tensions for nearly 20 years.	
1998	Irish Football Association	Efforts to reunite the Catholic and Protestant communities, in a match in Belfast between Cliftonville and Linfield.	
1999	New Zealand's football community	Efforts towards making the 1999 FIFA U-17 World Championship a resounding success.	
2000	(South Africa) Lucas Radebe	Working with children in South Africa and commitment to the fight against racism in football.	
2001	(Italy) Paolo Di Canio	Taking ball out of play with his hands, when opposing goalkeeper Paul Gerrard was injured on the ground.	
2002	(South Korea) Korea Football Association	Demonstrating a spirit of brotherhood and sportsmanship by co-hosting the 2002 FIFA World Cup.	
2002	Japan Football Association	Demonstrating a spirit of brotherhood and sportsmanship by co-hosting the 2002 FIFA World Cup.	
2003	(Scotland) Celtic's Fans	Exemplary behaviour in the 2003 UEFA Cup Final, despite Celtic losing 3–2 in extra-time to Porto.	
2004	Brazilian Football Confederation	Recognition of the "Match for Peace" played by the national teams of Brazil and Haiti, where tickets were offered in exchange for guns.	
2005	Community of Iquitos, Peru	Wholehearted support of the 2005 FIFA U-17 World Championship, and contribution to football.	
2006	(Germany) Fans of the 2006 FIFA World Cup	Fans' fair play, mutual respect, and special atmosphere created inside and outside the stadiums.	
2007	(Spain) Barcelona	Rejecting lucrative shirt sponsorship deals and instead carrying the UNICEF logo.	
2008	Turkish Football Federation	Encouraging dialogue between two countries which otherwise do not have any form of diplomatic relationship.	
2008	Football Federation of Armenia	Encouraging dialogue between two countries which otherwise do not have any form of diplomatic relationship.	
2009	(England) Bobby Robson	Posthumously awarded for commitment to fair play shown throughout his career as a player and coach.	
2010	Haiti women's national under-17 football team	Enduring hardships in wake of 2010 Haiti earthquake.	
2011	Japan Football Association	Enduring hardships in wake of 2011 Japan earthquake, while winning the 2011 FIFA Women's World Cup.	
2012	Uzbekistan Football Association	Showing that fair play and competition are not mutually exclusive but complement each other.	
2013	Afghanistan Football Federation	Solidarity in football against all odds through the after-effects of war, disorder and conflict.	
2014	(Brazil) (Canada) (Costa Rica) (Morocco) World Cup volunteers	Their work, tireless support, enthusiasm, and passion for the game as demonstrated at the 2014 FIFA World Cup, 2014 FIFA U-20 Women's World Cup, 2014 FIFA U-17 Women's World Cup, and 2014 FIFA Club World Cup.	
2015	All football organisations supporting refugees	Working to support refugees in the face of conflict. Accepted on their behalf by Gerald Asamoah, who campaigns for the welfare of refugees.	
2016	(Colombia) Atlético Nacional	Requested CONMEBOL to award Chapecoense with the 2016 Copa Sudamericana title after the LaMia Flight 2933 crash.	
2017	(Togo) Francis Koné	Saved the life of an opponent by administering on-pitch first aid after a collision.	
2018	(Germany) Lennart Thy	Missed an Eredivisie match for VVV Venlo against PSV Eindhoven to donate blood for a recipient in urgent need of matching stem cells for leukaemia treatment.	
2019	(Argentina) Marcelo Bielsa	After Leeds United scored while Aston Villa had an injured player on the pitch, Leeds United allowed Aston Villa to score unopposed.	
2019	(England) Leeds United	After Leeds United scored while Aston Villa had an injured player on the pitch, Leeds United allowed Aston Villa to score unopposed.	
2020	(Italy) Mattia Agnese	Administered critical first aid to an opponent who lost consciousness following an on-field collision.	
2021	Denmark national team and medical staff	Administered critical CPR and protected Christian Eriksen during the UEFA Euro 2020 group stage match versus Finland	
2022	(Georgia (country)) Luka Lochoshvili	Saving the life of Georg Teigl after he collapsed during a match.	
2023	Brazil national team	In a friendly against Guinea in June 2023, the Seleção swapped their traditional yellow jerseys for an all-black kit in an anti-racism statement.	
2024	(Brazil) Thiago Maia	Volunteering during the 2024 Rio Grande do Sul floods	
2025	(Germany) Andreas Harlass-Neuking	Saving a home fan's life during a match between SSV Jahn Regensburg and 1. FC Magdeburg	

=== Notes ===
- ^{b} – The Werder Bremen player admitted handball in the penalty area to the referee in a German League match against 1. FC Köln on 7 May 1988. Cologne went on to win the match 2–0.
- ^{l} – Caroline Hanlon accepted on behalf of the supporters.

In 2010 the Football Association of Ireland (FAI) refused the offer of a Fair Play award following the France and Republic of Ireland 2010 World Cup Play-offs handball controversy. CEO of the FAI John Delaney called FIFA President Sepp Blatter "an embarrassment to himself and an embarrassment to FIFA" for his handling and comments following the controversy.
