= 2005–06 Scottish League Cup =

2005–06 Co-operative Insurance Cup
Tournament details
- Country: Scotland

Final positions
- Champions: Celtic
- Runners-up: Dunfermline Athletic

The 2005–06 Scottish League Cup was the 60th staging of the Scotland's second most prestigious football knockout competition.

The competition was won by Celtic, who defeated Dunfermline Athletic 3–0 in the final.

== First round ==
Home team	Score	Away team
Albion Rovers	3–2	Gretna
Stirling Albion	2–1	Queen of the South
Alloa Athletic	2–1	Arbroath
Berwick Rangers	4–2	Elgin City
Brechin City	0–0	Partick Thistle
Cowdenbeath	2–3	St Johnstone
East Fife	0–1	Stranraer
East Stirlingshire	1–3	Queen's Park
Forfar Athletic	1–4	Ross County
Hamilton Academical	2–1	Dumbarton
Montrose	0–1	Clyde
Greenock Morton	1–2	Ayr United
Raith Rovers	2–0	Airdrie United
Stenhousemuir	0–1	Peterhead

== Second round ==
Home team	Score	Away team
Inverness CT	6–1	Alloa Athletic
Aberdeen	3–0	Berwick Rangers
Falkirk	2–1	Partick Thistle
Albion Rovers	1–3	Dunfermline Athletic
Kilmarnock	4–1	Stirling Albion
Motherwell	2–1	Hamilton Academical
Peterhead	2–3	Clyde
Queen's Park	0–2	Hearts
Raith Rovers	1–2	Livingston
Ross County	1–2	Ayr United
St Johnstone	0–1	St Mirren
Stranraer	3–1	Dundee

== Third round ==
Home team	Score	Away team
Ayr United	1–2	Hibernian
Celtic	2–1	Falkirk
Livingston	1–0	Hearts
Inverness CT	2–0	Dundee United
Kilmarnock	3–4	Dunfermline Athletic
Rangers	5 – 2 (a.e.t.)	Clyde
St Mirren	0–2	Motherwell
Stranraer	0–2	Aberdeen

== Quarter-finals ==
Home team	Score	Away team
Celtic	2–0	Rangers
Dunfermline Athletic	3–0	Hibernian
Livingston	2–1	Inverness CT
Motherwell	1–0	Aberdeen

== Semi-finals ==
25 January 2006

Dunfermline Athletic	1–0	Livingston
Harris 37' (pen.)	Report

Easter Road, Edinburgh
Attendance: 14,630
Referee: Dougie McDonald

1 February 2006

Motherwell	1–2	Celtic
Foran 11'	Report	Żurawski 29'; Maloney 88'

Hampden Park, Glasgow
Attendance: 42,595
Referee: Craig Thomson

== Final ==
19 March 2006

Dunfermline Athletic	0–3	Celtic
	Report	Żurawski 43'; Maloney 76'; Dublin 90'

Hampden Park, Glasgow
Attendance: 52,103
Referee: Stuart Dougal
