= Mohammed Sylla =

Footballer (born 1977)

Momo Sylla
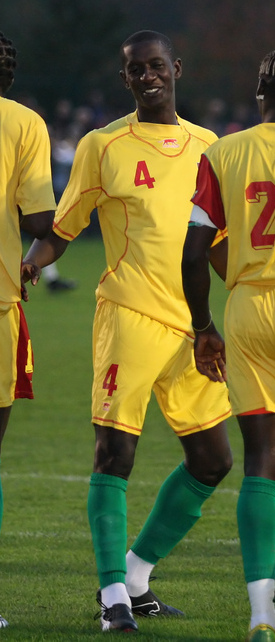
- Sylla with Guinea in 2006

Personal information
- Full name: Mohammed Sylla
- Date of birth: 13 March 1977 (age 49)
- Place of birth: Bouaké, Ivory Coast
- Height: 1.83 m (6 ft 0 in)
- Position: Winger

Senior career*
Years	Team	Apps	(Gls)
1995–1996	Créteil	42	(7)
1996–1999	Le Havre	66	(11)
1997–1998	→ Noisy-le-Sec (loan)	47	(16)
1999–2000	Le Mans	36	(14)
2000–2001	St Johnstone	35	(5)
2001–2005	Celtic	47	(3)
2005–2007	Leicester City	34	(0)
2007	Kilmarnock	11	(0)
Total		318	(56)

International career
1999–2007	Guinea	33	(2)
- * Club domestic league appearances and goals

Mohammed "Momo" Sylla (born 13 March 1977) is a former professional footballer who played as a winger. Born in Ivory Coast, he played for the Guinea national team at international level.

== Club career ==
Sylla started his football career at French Second Division club Créteil, on the outskirts of Paris, before moving on to Le Havre when he was 18. He also played for Le Mans, before moving to Scotland to sign for St Johnstone, where he was considered to be a fan favourite. Sylla was also considered to be quite an aggressive player during his time at St. Johnstone, as he picked up 16 yellow cards.

Celtic signed him for £650,000 in August 2001. Sylla played in a variety of different positions while at Celtic, but was never a first-team regular. Celtic won the league twice during Sylla's time at the club in 2001–02 and 2003–04. Sylla contributed nine league appearances to the first of these titles and fourteen to the second.

Celtic released Sylla in 2005 and he then signed for Leicester City at the beginning of the 2005–06 season. He then had a short stint with Scottish Premier League club Kilmarnock in early 2007 and a trial with Nottingham Forest, before retiring.

== International career ==
Born in the Ivory Coast, Sylla played for the Guinea national team internationally making 33 appearances between 1994 and 2007 and scoring twice.

== Personal life ==
Sylla is the youngest of six children. He has two brothers and three sisters. From age 10, he was brought up by his sisters in Paris, as his mother, Massiami Bamba, and father believed that opportunities would be better for him than they were in Africa.

He is one of at least two Guinean football players commonly known as Mohammed Sylla. Another, Mohamed Lamine Sylla, played with Willem II, Martigues and Ayr United, amongst others. The overlapping nature of the two players' careers has led to a degree of media confusion regarding the details of their transfers.

== Honours ==
Celtic

- Scottish Premier League: 2001–02, 2003–04
- Scottish Cup: 2003–04, 2004–05
- UEFA Cup: runner-up 2002–03

Individual

- St Johnstone Player of the Year: 2000–01
