= Shaun Maloney =

Scotland international footballer (born 1983)

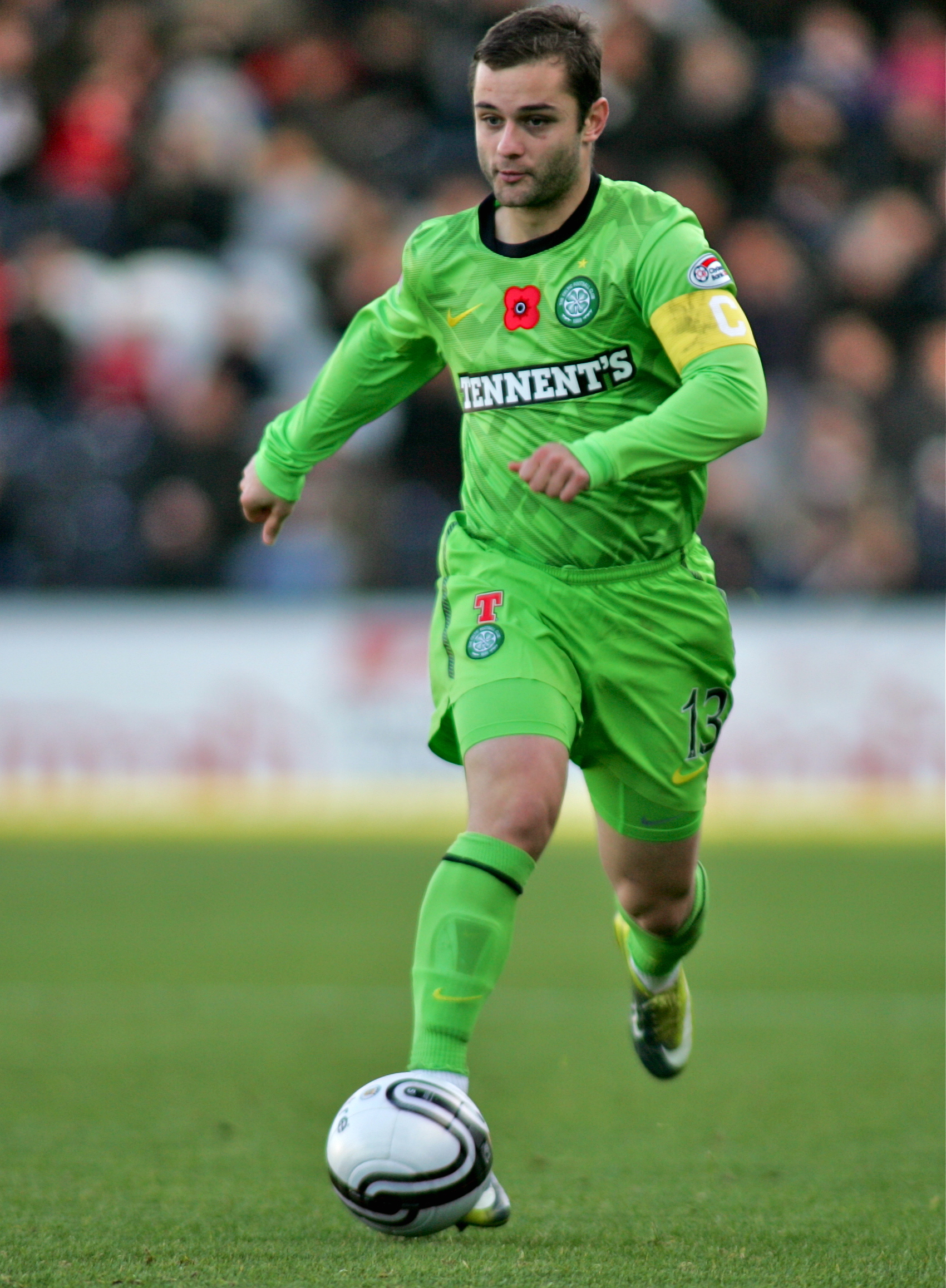
- Maloney with Celtic in 2010

Personal information
- Full name: Shaun Richard Maloney
- Date of birth: 24 January 1983 (age 43)
- Place of birth: Miri, Sarawak, Malaysia
- Height: 5 ft 7 in (1.70 m)
- Positions: Attacking midfielder; winger

Team information
- Current team: Celtic (assistant)

Youth career
- 1996–99: Albion Boys Club
- 1999–2001: Celtic

Senior career*
Years	Team	Apps	(Gls)
2001–2007	Celtic	104	(26)
2007–2008	Aston Villa	30	(5)
2008–2011	Celtic	54	(13)
2011–2015	Wigan Athletic	79	(14)
2015	Chicago Fire	14	(3)
2015–2017	Hull City	28	(2)
Total		309	(63)

International career
2002–2005	Scotland U21	20	(6)
2007	Scotland B	1	(1)
2005–2016	Scotland	47	(7)

Managerial career
- 2021–2022: Hibernian
- 2023–2025: Wigan Athletic
- 2026–: Celtic (assistant)
- * Club domestic league appearances and goals

Shaun Richard Maloney (born 24 January 1983) is a football coach, and former player who is currently the assistant manager at Scottish Premiership side Celtic.

Maloney played for Celtic, Aston Villa, Wigan Athletic, Chicago Fire, Hull City and the Scotland national team as an attacking midfielder or winger.

Maloney started his career at Celtic, playing 215 matches across all competitions and winning honours including five Scottish Premier League titles. He was the first player to claim both the SPFA Players' Player of the Year and the SPFA Young Player of the Year awards in the same season, doing so in 2005–06. He had a spell in the Premier League with Aston Villa, before returning for a second spell at Celtic. Maloney returned to English football in 2011 with Wigan Athletic, helping them win the 2013 FA Cup final. Maloney then briefly played in Major League Soccer for Chicago Fire. He last played for Hull City for two seasons, before retiring due to injury in 2017. Maloney made his senior international debut for Scotland in 2005 and he went on to earn 47 caps, scoring seven goals.

After retiring as a player, Maloney worked for Celtic and the Belgium national team as a coach. He was then appointed manager of Scottish club Hibernian in December 2021, but was sacked after four months. Maloney was appointed manager of Wigan Athletic in January 2023. He departed the club in March 2025.

== Early life ==
Maloney was born to an English father and Scottish mother in Miri, a coastal city in north-eastern Sarawak, Malaysia, on 24 January 1983. He spent his infancy in Malaysia while his father, a helicopter pilot and armed forces veteran, worked there as a flying instructor. The family returned to Britain when Maloney was five years old, after his father accepted a job in Aberdeen, Scotland. In a 2014 interview, Maloney said: "Although I am Scottish and play for Scotland, Malaysia will always be a special part of me."

Maloney was educated at St Joseph's Primary School and Cults Academy in Aberdeen.

Aged 10, he had joined his first football club, Kincorth Boys' Club. At 12, he moved to Culter Boys' Club then at 14, to Albion Boys' Club.

It was revealed in 2013, that as a youngster Maloney had played tennis regularly against future World Number 1, Andy Murray.

== Playing career ==
=== Celtic ===
After joining Celtic as a trainee in 1999, Maloney made his first team debut on 29 April 2001 against Rangers at Ibrox Stadium, in a 3–0 win for Celtic. He spent the next few years trying to break into the first team, spending most of his time as a substitute. Despite not playing regularly, Maloney acquired a reputation for being a free kick specialist. Maloney did appear several times for Celtic during their run to the UEFA Cup final in 2003, and scored in a 3–1 win over VfB Stuttgart at Parkhead in the Round of 16.

In February 2004, Maloney picked up a cruciate ligament injury. He returned from the injury late in season 2004–05, starting only one game in that season.

Maloney hit top form for Celtic in the 2005–06 season, after being moved from a striking position to the left of midfield by manager Gordon Strachan. His displays received praise from players, fans and the media throughout the year, and in recognition of his excellent season he was awarded both the SPFA Player of the Year and Young Player of the Year awards, the first time a player has won both plaudits in the same season. He also won Celtic Fans' Player of the Year, and Players Player of the Year in a season which saw him score 16 goals and contribute 28 assists from midfield.

With his contract expiring at the end of the 2006–07 season, Celtic moved to offer Maloney a new deal. However, contract negotiations continued for months, constantly breaking down due to differences between the two parties. Chief Executive Peter Lawwell asserted that Celtic "cannot keep players at any cost" while Maloney warned that "In situations like this one, both parties have to be completely happy with the outcome." He also promised that the prolonged contract talks would not affect his football and that he hoped he would not have to consider leaving the club in the future.

Maloney would have been able to leave Celtic for free in the summer of 2007, by signing a pre-contract agreement with another club. No new contract was agreed with Celtic, and they subsequently agreed a £1 million transfer to Aston Villa. In his first tenure, Maloney made a total of 139 appearances for the Hoops in all competitions, scoring 37 times.

=== Aston Villa ===
Just before the transfer window closed on 31 January 2007, Maloney signed a pre-contract agreement with Aston Villa. Villa manager Martin O'Neill, who managed him at Celtic, was keen to bring Maloney to Villa for the second half of the season however and moments before the deadline he signed for the Midlands club for a reported fee of £1 million. He made his debut in the 2–0 defeat at Reading on 10 February 2007 On 28 April 2007, Maloney scored his first Villa goal in a victory against Manchester City at the City of Manchester Stadium from a free kick which was curled around the wall into the bottom right of the goal.

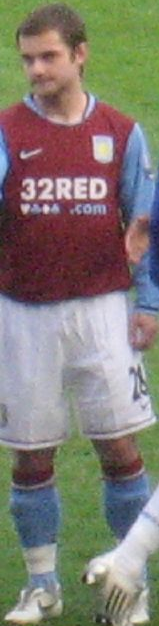
Maloney before an Aston Villa game in 2007

Maloney had trouble settling into the club but after a somewhat lacklustre start to his Villa career, he began to show his best form. Maloney has acknowledged that his football had been suffering but remained optimistic about his future at the club: "Homesickness has affected my form. I haven't played well enough to play in the team and I think that has shown, so hopefully now things can change." Both O'Neill and teammate Stiliyan Petrov, who were both at Celtic during Maloney's time there, had expressed their desire for Maloney to stay at the club despite reports linking him with a move back to Scotland.

Maloney scored a brace for Aston Villa in a 4–4 draw with Chelsea at Stamford Bridge on Boxing Day 2007. However, after that Maloney did not play a lot of matches as half of his last season appearances were substitutions, and he also said that he would like to one day go back and play in Scotland.

=== Return to Celtic ===
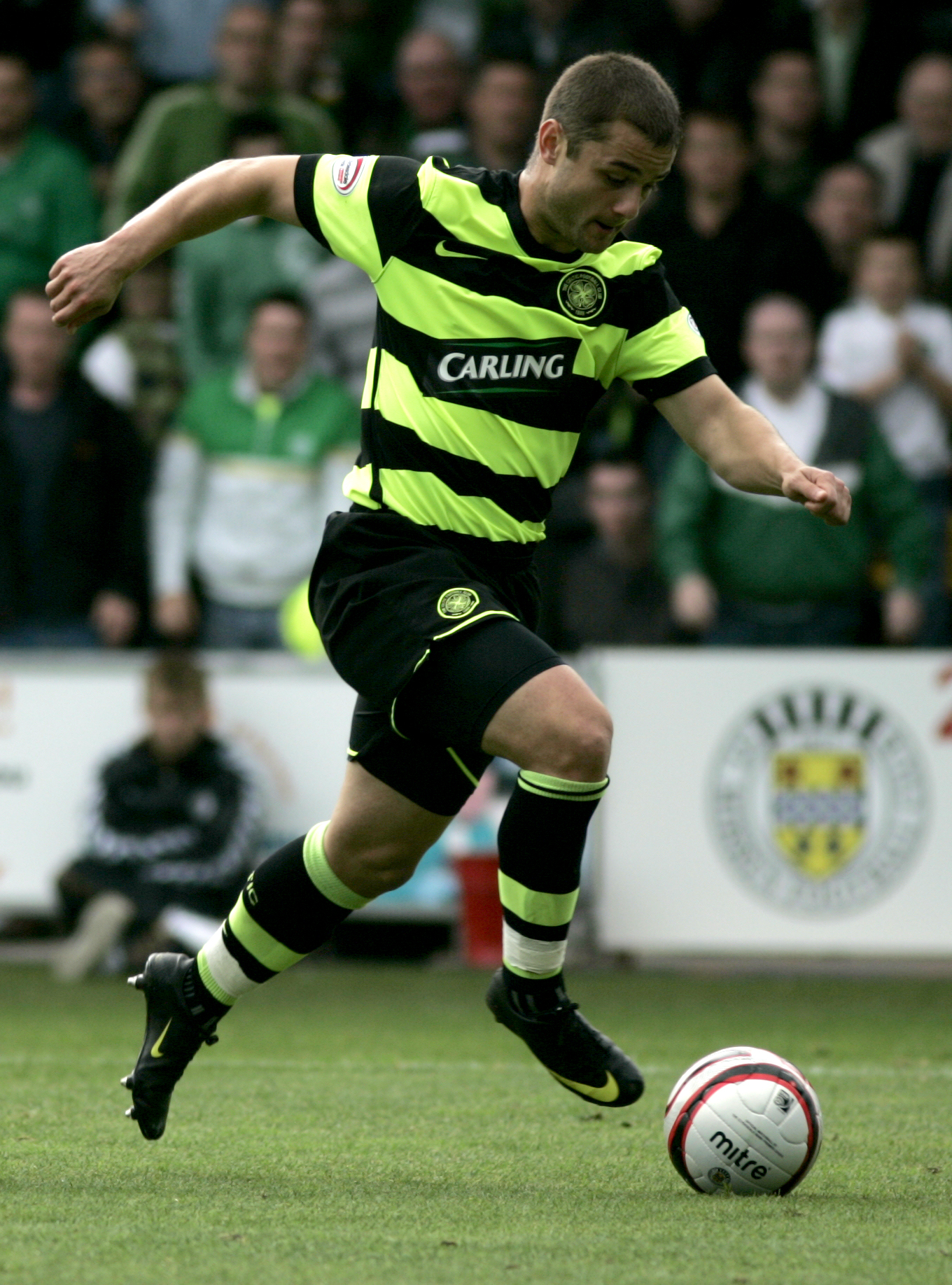
Maloney playing for Celtic in 2009

On 22 August 2008, Celtic announced the signing of Maloney on a four-year deal for a fee of £3 million. Maloney marked his return with a Man of the Match performance and two assists in his first match, after coming off the bench for Jan Vennegoor of Hesselink in a 3–0 victory over Falkirk at Celtic Park. Maloney scored his first goal after his return to Celtic in a 4–2 away win over Motherwell and managed his second the following week in a 3–1 away win at Kilmarnock. He finished the season with five goals, taking his total Celtic goals tally to 42.

Under new manager Tony Mowbray, Maloney played in 17 of Celtic's first 18 fixtures of season 2009–10. However he began having trouble with his Achilles tendon after the 2–1 defeat against Rangers on 4 October 2009. Maloney played a further four matches after that, but was substituted at half-time in Celtic's League Cup defeat against Hearts. It was revealed he was suffering from Achilles tendinitis, and he did not play another game that season.

Maloney started the 2010–11 season in good form with goals against St Mirren, Hearts and a brace against Hamilton. After this run of form, Maloney was given the short-term captaincy of Celtic in the absence of Scott Brown through injury. However, fitness problems flared up again for Maloney in November 2010 when he injured his ankle during a league match against Inverness Caledonian Thistle. He required to undergo ankle surgery in December, and didn't return to the first team until April 2011. Maloney featured in eight of Celtic's remaining matches; scoring against Aberdeen in the Scottish Cup semi-final and then against Motherwell in the last league fixture of the season.

=== Wigan Athletic ===
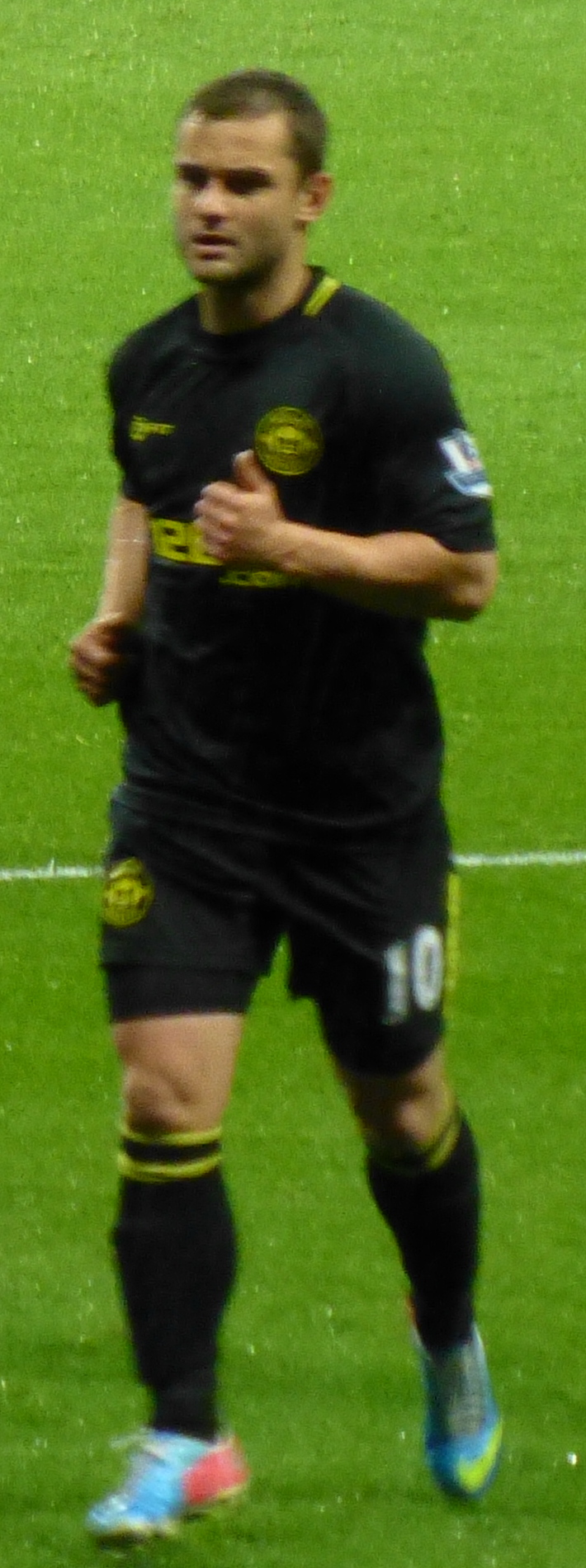
Maloney playing for Wigan in May 2013, in the match which saw them relegated from the Premier League

Maloney joined Wigan Athletic in the Premier League on 31 August 2011 for a fee of £850,000, signing a three-year deal. He made his debut on 13 September 2011 in a 2–1 defeat against Crystal Palace in the League Cup. He struggled to break into the first team, appearing three times as a substitute during the first half of the 2011–12 season. Maloney admitted his fitness "was lacking a little bit" when he joined the club, and manager Roberto Martínez felt that Maloney needed more time to settle-in. On 11 March 2012, he made his first Premier League appearance in almost five months, coming on as a substitute against Norwich City. His performance was described as "outstanding", and he was rewarded with his first league start for the club in the following game against West Bromwich Albion. On 24 March 2012, he scored a penalty against Liverpool at Anfield in a 1–2 win for Wigan – his first goal for the club. Maloney topped this effort with a wonderful curling goal against Manchester United on 11 April, lifting his side out of the relegation zone for the first time since October with a 1–0 win. Then, on 28 April 2012, Maloney scored Wigan's third goal in an emphatic 4–0 home win over fourth placed Newcastle.

On 17 January 2013, it was announced that Maloney signed a new contract with Wigan Athletic, keeping him at the club until 2015.

On 7 April 2013, Maloney scored a 94th minute free kick goal, seconds from the end of the QPR match at Loftus Road which earned Wigan Athletic a valuable point in their race to once again escape from Premier League relegation. Six days later, on 13 April 2013, Maloney scored Wigan Athletic's first goal in the FA Cup semi-final at Wembley against Millwall, with a volley on the 25th minute and was voted man of the match, guiding Wigan Athletic to their first ever FA Cup final. On 11 May 2013 Maloney won the FA Cup with Wigan, playing the whole game and assisting the only goal of the match in a 1–0 upset win against Manchester City. However, only three days later, Wigan were relegated from the Premier League following a 4–1 defeat against Arsenal at the Emirates Stadium.

=== Chicago Fire ===
On 25 January 2015, Maloney signed for Major League Soccer side Chicago Fire for an undisclosed fee. He was signed as one of the team's Designated Players. On 4 April 2015, Maloney scored his first goal for Fire in a 3–2 win over Toronto at Toyota Park, and went on to win MLS player of the week honours.

=== Hull City ===
After only eight months in Chicago, Maloney signed a two-year contract with Hull City on 27 August 2015. Maloney was transferred for an undisclosed fee.

He made his debut on 29 August 2015 in the home match against Preston North End which City won 2–0. Maloney came off the bench to score his first goal, on 21 November 2015, in a 1–1 draw away to Bristol City.

His contract with Hull expired after the 2016–17 season. Maloney discussed terms with Aberdeen, but a hernia injury prevented him from signing. He then indicated to Aberdeen manager Derek McInnes that he may retire and become a coach.

=== International ===
Maloney made 20 appearances and netted six times for Scotland Under 21s.

Maloney made his full international debut as a half-time substitute in Scotland's 1–0 defeat to Belarus at Hampden Park on 8 October 2005. He scored his first international goal, a free-kick in the Svangaskard Stadium in a 2–0 victory over the Faroe Islands in June 2007.

Maloney scored five goals in UEFA Euro 2016 qualifying Group D, including the winner in Scotland's home tie against the Republic of Ireland.

== Coaching career ==
Celtic appointed Maloney to a coaching role with their under-20 development squad in August 2017. Maloney was added to the coaching staff of the Belgium national team in September 2018. Later that month, he left Celtic to take the position with Belgium on a full-time basis. Maloney worked for Belgium during the delayed UEFA Euro 2020 tournament, in which they lost to, eventual winners, Italy in the quarter-finals.

=== Hibernian ===
Maloney was appointed manager of Scottish club Hibernian in December 2021. They won his first two matches as manager, but a run of one win in 13 league games meant that they dropped into the bottom half of the 2021–22 Scottish Premiership when it split after 33 games. Maloney was sacked by Hibs on 19 April 2022, a few days after they had been beaten 2–1 in a Scottish Cup semi-final by Edinburgh derby rivals Hearts.

During May 2022 Dundee entered discussions with Maloney with a view to him becoming their manager, but they failed to reach an agreement.

=== Wigan Athletic ===
Maloney returned to Wigan Athletic on 28 January 2023 as manager.

On 2 March 2025, having managed to keep the club in the third tier despite an eight-point deduction, Maloney was sacked following a 2–1 home defeat to Reading. This left the club sitting in fifteenth position, just six points above the relegation zone.

=== Celtic coach ===
Maloney returned to Celtic in June 2025 as their player pathway manager. After first team manager Brendan Rodgers left the club in October 2025, Maloney was made assistant manager on an interim basis under O'Neill. He left the club along with O'Neill in December, but would come back after the sacking of Wilfred Nancy only 1 month later along with O'Neill.

== Career statistics ==
=== Club ===
Appearances and goals by club, season and competition
Club	Season	League			National cup		League cup		Other		Total	
Club	Season	Division	Apps	Goals	Apps	Goals	Apps	Goals	Apps	Goals	Apps	Goals
Celtic	2000–01	Scottish Premier League	4	0	–		–		–		4	0
Celtic	2001–02	Scottish Premier League	16	5	2	1	1	4	1	0	20	10
Celtic	2002–03	Scottish Premier League	20	3	3	0	3	1	4	1	30	5
Celtic	2003–04	Scottish Premier League	17	5	1	0	2	0	3	1	23	6
Celtic	2004–05	Scottish Premier League	2	0	1	0	0	0	0	0	3	0
Celtic	2005–06	Scottish Premier League	36	13	1	0	4	3	2	0	43	16
Celtic	2006–07	Scottish Premier League	9	0	0	0	1	0	5	0	15	0
Celtic	Total		104	26	8	1	11	8	15	2	138	37
Aston Villa	2006–07	Premier League	8	1	–		–		–		8	1
Aston Villa	2007–08	Premier League	22	4	1	0	2	2	–		25	6
Aston Villa	Total		30	5	1	0	2	2	0	0	33	7
Celtic	2008–09	Scottish Premier League	21	4	1	0	2	0	6	1	30	5
Celtic	2009–10	Scottish Premier League	9	4	0	0	1	0	7	0	17	4
Celtic	2010–11	Scottish Premier League	21	5	1	1	1	0	3	0	26	6
Celtic	2011–12	Scottish Premier League	3	0	0	0	0	0	1	0	4	0
Celtic	Total		54	13	2	1	4	0	17	1	77	15
Wigan Athletic	2011–12	Premier League	13	3	1	0	1	0	–		15	3
Wigan Athletic	2012–13	Premier League	36	6	4	1	1	0	–		41	7
Wigan Athletic	2013–14	Championship	10	3	0	0	0	0	3	0	13	3
Wigan Athletic	2014–15	Championship	20	2	1	0	1	0	0	0	22	2
Wigan Athletic	Total		79	14	6	1	3	0	3	0	91	15
Chicago Fire	2015	Major League Soccer	14	3	3	0	–		–		17	3
Hull City	2015–16	Championship	20	1	1	0	2	0	–		23	1
Hull City	2016–17	Premier League	10	1	1	0	4	0	–		15	1
Hull City	Total		30	2	2	0	6	0	0	0	38	2
Career total			311	63	21	3	26	10	35	3	394	79

=== International ===
Appearances and goals by national team and year
National team	Year	Apps	Goals
Scotland	2005	2	0
Scotland	2007	7	1
Scotland	2008	6	0
Scotland	2009	2	0
Scotland	2010	2	0
Scotland	2012	5	0
Scotland	2013	7	1
Scotland	2014	6	2
Scotland	2015	8	3
Scotland	2016	2	0
Total		47	7

Scores and results list Scotland's goal tally first, score column indicates score after each Maloney goal.

List of international goals scored by Shaun Maloney
No.	Date	Venue	Opponent	Score	Result	Competition
1	6 June 2007	Svangaskard, Toftir, Faroes	Faroe Islands	1–0	2–0	UEFA Euro 2008 qualifying
2	10 September 2013	Philip II Arena, Skopje, Republic of Macedonia	North Macedonia	2–1	2–1	2014 FIFA World Cup qualifying
3	14 October 2014	Stadion Narodowy, Warsaw, Poland	Poland	1–1	2–2	UEFA Euro 2016 qualifying
4	14 November 2014	Celtic Park, Glasgow, Scotland	Republic of Ireland	1–0	1–0	UEFA Euro 2016 qualifying
5	29 March 2015	Hampden Park, Glasgow, Scotland	Gibraltar	1–0	6–1	UEFA Euro 2016 qualifying
6	29 March 2015	Hampden Park, Glasgow, Scotland	Gibraltar	3–1	6–1	UEFA Euro 2016 qualifying
7	11 October 2015	Estádio Algarve, Faro, Portugal	Gibraltar	2–0	6–0	UEFA Euro 2016 qualifying

=== Managerial record ===
As of 1 March 2025

Managerial record by team and tenure
Team	From	To	Record					Ref
Team	From	To	P	W	D	L	Win %	Ref
Hibernian	20 December 2021	19 April 2022	19	6	6	7	31.6	
Wigan Athletic	28 January 2023	2 March 2025	115	42	33	40	36.5	
Total			134	48	39	47	35.8	

== Honours ==
Celtic

- Scottish Premier League: 2000–01, 2001–02, 2003–04, 2005–06, 2006–07
- Scottish League Cup: 2000–01, 2005–06, 2008–09
- UEFA Cup runner-up: 2002–03

Wigan Athletic

- FA Cup: 2012–13

Hull City

- Football League Championship play-offs: 2016

Individual

- PFA Scotland Players' Player of the Year: 2005–06
- PFA Scotland Young Player of the Year: 2005–06

== See also ==
- List of Scotland international footballers born outside Scotland
