= 1956–57 Heart of Midlothian F.C. season =

Heart of Midlothian
1956–57 season
- Manager: Tommy Walker
- Stadium: Tynecastle Park
- Scottish First Division: 2nd
- Scottish Cup: Round 5
- League Cup: Group Stage

During the 1956–57 season Hearts competed in the Scottish First Division, the Scottish Cup, the Scottish League Cup and the East of Scotland Shield.

== Fixtures ==
=== Friendlies ===
21 August 1956 Friendly	Dunbar United	1–5	Hearts	Countess Park

19 September 1956 Friendly	Newcastle United	1–2	Hearts	St James' Park

15 October 1956 Friendly	Hearts	2–4	Tottenham Hotspur	Tynecastle Park

5 November 1956 Friendly	Hearts	0–0	Newcastle United	Tynecastle Park

12 November 1956 Friendly	Tottenham Hotspur	2–4	Hearts	White Hart Lane

19 November 1956 Cup Winners' Challenge	Hearts	3–4	Manchester City	Tynecastle Park

26 November 1956 Friendly	Linfield	1–9	Hearts	Windsor Park

16 February 1957 Friendly	Hearts	3–6	Bolton Wanderers	Tynecastle Park

17 April 1957 Friendly	Hearts	3–2	Combined Services XI	Tynecastle Park

22 April 1957 Friendly	Forfar Athletic	4–9	Hearts	Station Park

29 April 1957 Friendly	Linlithgow Rose	0–6	Hearts	Prestonfield

=== East of Scotland Shield ===
24 April 1957 Final	Hibernian	2–1	Hearts	Easter Road

=== League Cup ===
11 August 1956 League Cup Group	Hearts	6–1	Hibernian	Tynecastle Park
				Attendance: 42,000

15 August 1956 League Cup Group	Partick Thistle	3–1	Hearts	Firhill Park
				Attendance: 21,000

18 August 1956 League Cup Group	Hearts	5–0	Falkirk	Tynecastle Park
				Attendance: 20,000

25 August 1956 League Cup Group	Hibernian	1–2	Hearts	Easter Road
				Attendance: 40,000

29 August 1956 League Cup Group	Hearts	2–2	Partick Thistle	Tynecastle Park
				Attendance: 30,000

1 September 1956 League Cup Group	Falkirk	1–1	Hearts	Brockville Park
				Attendance: 14,000

=== Scottish Cup ===
2 February 1957 Scottish Cup R5	Hearts	0–4	Rangers	Tynecastle Park
				Attendance: 47,484

=== Scottish First Division ===
8 September 1956 Scottish First Division	Dunfermline Athletic	2–3	Hearts	East End Park
				Attendance: 14,000

15 September 1956 Scottish First Division	Hearts	2–2	St Mirren	Tynecastle Park
				Attendance: 16,000

22 September 1956 Scottish First Division	Hibernian	2–3	Hearts	Easter Road
				Attendance: 39,000

29 September 1956 Scottish First Division	Hearts	2–1	Dundee	Tynecastle Park
				Attendance: 30,000

6 October 1956 Scottish First Division	Ayr United	0–2	Hearts	Somerset Park
				Attendance: 14,000

13 October 1956 Scottish First Division	Hearts	2–5	East Fife	Tynecastle Park
				Attendance: 22,000

20 October 1956 Scottish First Division	Airdrieonians	3–4	Hearts	Broomfield Park
				Attendance: 11,000

27 October 1956 Scottish First Division	Falkirk	0–2	Hearts	Brockville Park
				Attendance: 16,000

3 November 1956 Scottish First Division	Hearts	1–0	Partick Thistle	Tynecastle Park
				Attendance: 20,000

10 November 1956 Scottish First Division	Raith Rovers	2–3	Hearts	Stark's Park
				Attendance: 19,000

17 November 1956 Scottish First Division	Hearts	3–2	Kilmarnock	Tynecastle Park
				Attendance: 14,000

24 November 1956 Scottish First Division	Hearts	6–1	Queen's Park	Tynecastle Park
				Attendance: 24,000

1 December 1956 Scottish First Division	Celtic	1–1	Hearts	Celtic Park
				Attendance: 32,000

8 December 1956 Scottish First Division	Hearts	3–2	Motherwell	Tynecastle Park
				Attendance: 35,000

15 December 1956 Scottish First Division	Rangers	5–3	Hearts	Ibrox Park
				Attendance: 45,000

22 December 1956 Scottish First Division	Hearts	3–1	Queen of the South	Tynecastle Park
				Attendance: 11,000

29 December 1956 Scottish First Division	Aberdeen	2–3	Hearts	Pittodrie Park
				Attendance: 20,000

1 January 1957 Scottish First Division	Hearts	0–2	Hibernian	Tynecastle Park
				Attendance: 35,000

2 January 1957 Scottish First Division	St Mirren	0–2	Hearts	St Mirren Park, Love Street
				Attendance: 11,000

5 January 1957 Scottish First Division	Hearts	5–1	Dunfermline Athletic	Tynecastle Park
				Attendance: 19,000

12 January 1957 Scottish First Division	Dundee	0–3	Hearts	Dens Park
				Attendance: 19,000

19 January 1957 Scottish First Division	Hearts	2–2	Ayr United	Tynecastle Park
				Attendance: 18,000

26 January 1957 Scottish First Division	East Fife	1–3	Hearts	Bayview Park
				Attendance: 9,000

9 February 1957 Scottish First Division	Hearts	2–0	Airdrieonians	Tynecastle Park
				Attendance: 19,000

23 February 1957 Scottish First Division	Hearts	1–1	Falkirk	Tynecastle Park
				Attendance: 18,000

2 March 1957 Scottish First Division	Partick Thistle	2–2	Hearts	Firhill Park
				Attendance: 26,000

9 March 1957 Scottish First Division	Hearts	2–1	Raith Rovers	Tynecastle Park
				Attendance: 30,000

16 March 1957 Scottish First Division	Kilmarnock	4–1	Hearts	Rugby Park
				Attendance: 18,598

25 March 1957 Scottish First Division	Queen's Park	0–1	Hearts	Hampden Park
				Attendance: 7,797

30 March 1957 Scottish First Division	Hearts	3–1	Celtic	Tynecastle Park
				Attendance: 25,000

6 April 1957 Scottish First Division	Motherwell	1–3	Hearts	Fir Park
				Attendance: 18,000

13 April 1957 Scottish First Division	Hearts	0–1	Rangers	Tynecastle Park
				Attendance: 49,000

20 April 1957 Scottish First Division	Queen of the South	0–2	Hearts	Palmerston Park
				Attendance: 8,000

27 April 1957 Scottish First Division	Hearts	3–0	Aberdeen	Tynecastle Park
				Attendance: 15,000

== See also ==
- List of Heart of Midlothian F.C. seasons
