= 1956–57 Celtic F.C. season =

Celtic
1956–57 season
- Manager: Jimmy McGrory
- Stadium: Celtic Park
- Scottish Division One: 5th
- Scottish Cup: Semi-final
- Scottish League Cup: Winners

During the 1956–57 Scottish football season, Celtic competed in Scottish Division One.

== Competitions ==
=== Scottish Division One ===
==== League table ====
Pos	Team	Pld	W	D	L	GF	GA	GR	Pts
3	Kilmarnock	34	16	10	8	57	39	1.462	42
4	Raith Rovers	34	16	7	11	84	58	1.448	39
5	Celtic	34	15	8	11	58	43	1.349	38
6	Aberdeen	34	18	2	14	79	59	1.339	38
7	Motherwell	34	16	5	13	72	66	1.091	37

Source: RSSSF

==== Matches ====
8 September 1956 Division One	Celtic	2–0	Queen's Park	Glasgow
15:00 GMT				Stadium: Celtic Park; Attendance: 28,000

22 September 1956 Division One	Celtic	0–2	Rangers	Glasgow
15:00				Stadium: Celtic Park; Attendance: 53,000

29 September 1956 Division One	Motherwell	1–0	Celtic	Motherwell
15:00				Stadium: Fir Park; Attendance: 21,000

13 October 1956 Division One	Falkirk	0–1	Celtic	Falkirk
15:00 GMT				Stadium: Brockville Park; Attendance: 20,000

20 October 1956 Division One	Celtic	1–1	Raith Rovers	Glasgow
14:45 BST				Stadium: Celtic Park; Attendance: 16,000

3 November 1956 Division One	Dundee	2–1	Celtic	Dundee
15:00 BST				Stadium: Dens Park; Attendance: 24,000

10 November 1956 Division One	Celtic	4–0	East Fife	Glasgow
14:30 BST				Stadium: Celtic Park; Attendance: 17,000

17 November 1956 Division One	Ayr United	1–3	Celtic	Ayr
15:00 BST				Stadium: Somerset Park; Attendance: 14,000

24 November 1956 Division One	Celtic	1–1	Partick Thistle	Glasgow
14:15 BST				Stadium: Celtic Park; Attendance: 18,000

1 December 1956 Division One	Celtic	1–1	Hearts	Glasgow
14:15 GMT				Stadium: Celtic Park; Attendance: 32,000

8 December 1956 Division One	St Mirren	0–2	Celtic	Paisley
15:00 GMT				Stadium: St Mirren Park, Love Street; Attendance: 21,500

15 December 1956 Division One	Celtic	3–1	Dunfermline Athletic	Glasgow
14:15 GMT				Stadium: Celtic Park; Attendance: 11,000

22 December 1956 Division One	Airdrieonians	3–7	Celtic	Airdrie
15:00 GMT				Stadium: Broomfield Park; Attendance: 16,000

29 December 1956 Division One	Hibernian	3–3	Celtic	Edinburgh
15:00 GMT				Stadium: Easter Road; Attendance: 31,000

1 January 1957 Division One	Rangers	2–0	Celtic	Glasgow
14:00 GMT				Stadium: Ibrox Park; Attendance: 60,000

2 January 1957 Division One	Celtic	1–1	Kilmarnock	Glasgow
14:15 GMT				Stadium: Celtic Park; Attendance: 14,000

5 January 1957 Division One	Queen's Park	2–0	Celtic	Glasgow
14:15 GMT				Stadium: Hampden Park; Attendance: 22,674

12 January 1957 Division One	Celtic	2–1	Motherwell	Glasgow
14:30 GMT				Stadium: Celtic Park; Attendance: 33,000

19 January 1957 Division One	Queen of the South	4–3	Celtic	Dumfries
14:45 GMT				Stadium: Palmerston Park; Attendance: 11,000

26 January 1957 Division One	Celtic	4–0	Falkirk	Glasgow
15:00 GMT				Stadium: Celtic Park; Attendance: 18,000

9 February 1957 Division One	Raith Rovers	3–1	Celtic	Kirkcaldy
15:00 GMT				Stadium: Stark's Park; Attendance: 20,000

23 February 1957 Division One	Celtic	2–1	Aberdeen	Glasgow
16:15 GMT				Stadium: Celtic Park; Attendance: 49,000

6 March 1957 Division One	Celtic	1–1	Dundee	Glasgow
15:30 GMT				Stadium: Celtic Park; Attendance: 7,000

9 March 1957 Division One	East Fife	2–0	Celtic	Methil
15:00 GMT				Stadium: Bayview Park; Attendance: 9,000

16 March 1957 Division One	Celtic	4–0	Ayr United	Glasgow
15:00 GMT				Stadium: Celtic Park; Attendance: 16,000

30 March 1957 Division One	Hearts	3–1	Celtic	Edinburgh
15:00 GMT				Stadium: Tynecastle Park; Attendance: 25,000

10 April 1957 Division One	Partick Thistle	3–1	Celtic	Glasgow
19:15 GMT				Stadium: Firhill Park; Attendance: 12,000

13 April 1957 Division One	Dunfermline Athletic	0–1	Celtic	Dunfermline
15:00 GMT				Stadium: East End Park; Attendance: 7,000

17 April 1957 Division One	Celtic	2–3	St Mirren	Glasgow
19:00 BST				Stadium: Celtic Park; Attendance: 5,000

20 April 1957 Division One	Celtic	3–0	Airdrieonians	Glasgow
15:00 GMT				Stadium: Celtic Park; Attendance: 6,000

22 April 1957 Division One	Aberdeen	0–1	Celtic	Aberdeen
15:00 BST				Stadium: Pittodrie Park; Attendance: 15,000

26 April 1957 Division One	Kilmarnock	0–0	Celtic	Kilmarnock
19:15 BST				Stadium: Rugby Park; Attendance: 6,917

27 April 1957 Division One	Celtic	2–1	Hibernian	Glasgow
15:00 BST				Stadium: Celtic Park; Attendance: 12,000

29 April 1957 Division One	Celtic	0–0	Queen of the South	Glasgow
19:00 BST				Stadium: Celtic Park; Attendance: 3,000

=== Scottish Cup ===
2 February 1957 Fifth round	Forres Mechanics	0–5	Celtic	Forres
15:00 GMT				Stadium: Mosset Park; Attendance: 7,000

16 February 1957 Sixth Round	Celtic	4–4	Rangers	Glasgow
15:00 GMT				Stadium: Celtic Park; Attendance: 55,000

20 February 1957 Sixith Round replay	Rangers	0–2	Celtic	Glasgow
15:00 GMT				Stadium: Ibrox Park; Attendance: 88,000

2 March 1957 Seventh Round	Celtic	2–1	St Mirren	Glasgow
15:00 GMT				Stadium: Celtic Park; Attendance: 49,000

23 March 1957 Semi-final	Kilmarnock	1–1	Celtic	Glasgow
15:00 GMT				Stadium: Hampden Park; Attendance: 109,055

27 March 1957 Semi-final replay	Kilmarnock	3–1	Celtic	Glasgow
16:00 GMT				Stadium: Hampden Park; Attendance: 76,637

=== Scottish League Cup ===
11 August 1956 Group 8	Aberdeen	1–2	Celtic	Aberdeen
15:00 GMT				Stadium: Pittodrie Park; Attendance: 35,000

15 August 1956 Group 8	Celtic	2–1	Rangers	Glasgow
19:00 GMT				Stadium: Celtic Park; Attendance: 45,000

18 August 1956 Group 8	Celtic	2–1	East Fife	Glasgow
15:00 GMT				Stadium: Celtic Park; Attendance: 28,000

25 August 1956 Group 8	Celtic	3–2	Aberdeen	Glasgow
15:00 GMT				Stadium: Celtic Park; Attendance: 36,000

29 August 1956 Group 8	Rangers	0–0	Celtic	Glasgow
18:45 GMT				Stadium: Ibrox Park; Attendance: 84,000

1 September 1956 Group 8	East Fife	0–1	Celtic	Methil
15:00 GMT				Stadium: Bayview Park; Attendance: 16,535

12 September 1956 Quarter-final 1st leg	Celtic	6–0	Dunfermline Athletic	Glasgow
18:00 GMT				Stadium: Celtic Park; Attendance: 23,000

15 September 1956 Quarter-final 2nd leg	Dunfermline Athletic	3–0	Celtic	Dunfermline
15:00 GMT				Stadium: East End Park; Attendance: 16,000

6 October 1956 Semi-final	Celtic	2–0	Clyde	Glasgow
15:00 GMT				Stadium: Hampden Park; Attendance: 36,648

27 October 1956 Final	Celtic	0–0	Partick Thistle	Glasgow
14:15 GMT				Stadium: Hampden Park; Attendance: 50,975

31 October 1956 Final replay	Celtic	3–0	Partick Thistle	Glasgow
14:15 GMT				Stadium: Hampden Park; Attendance: 31,051
