= Billy McPhail =

Scottish footballer

Personal information
- Full name: William Simeon McPhail
- Date of birth: 2 February 1928
- Place of birth: Possilpark, Scotland
- Date of death: 4 April 2003 (aged 75)
- Place of death: Glasgow, Scotland
- Position: Centre forward

Senior career*
Years	Team	Apps	(Gls)
1941–1947	Queen's Park	12	(2)
1947–1956	Clyde	137	(90)
1956–1958	Celtic	33	(13)

International career
1949	British Army	1	(0)
1952	Scottish B League XI	1	(3)
1953	Scotland XI	1	(3)
- * Club domestic league appearances and goals

William Simeon McPhail (2 February 1928 – 4 April 2003) was a Scottish football player who played for Queen's Park, Clyde and Celtic. He scored three goals in Celtic's record 7–1 victory over Rangers in the 1957 Scottish League Cup final. After retiring, he developed a neurodegenerative disease, which he believed to be a result of brain damage acquired from heading footballs. He was the younger brother of fellow player John McPhail.

== Career ==
McPhail's 17-year playing career began when he signed for Queen's Park in 1941. He was a centre forward and soon earned the nickname "Teazy Weazy." He was, according to football historian Bob Crampsey, "an extremely graceful player... a particularly good header of a ball".

He was then sold to Clyde in 1947, but his career there was interrupted with recurring injuries. He had an excellent scoring record whilst with the Bully Wee, scoring 90 goals in 137 league games. At Clyde, McPhail missed the 1955 Scottish Cup final with injury.

His early career at Shawfield was interrupted in January 1948 when he was called up to the army. McPhail continued to play football in the army. He represented the Southern Command in the Army Command Challenge Cup, and featured regularly for the British Army representative team.

The Bully Wee won four trophies in season 1951–52. As the team won Division Two, McPhail finished as top scorer in the league. He also scored in three separate cup finals, the Glasgow Cup, Charity Cup, and Supplementary Cup, all of which were won.

In May 1956 he signed for Celtic for £2,500, the team his elder brother John had previously captained. He made his debut in a 2–1 Scottish League Cup win against Aberdeen. Later that season, McPhail scored twice in the League Cup final, helping Celtic lift the trophy for the first time. The following year, he starred in the Celtic team that played fierce Old Firm rivals Rangers in the final of the same competition. The match, referred to by fans in poem and song as "Hampden in the sun", resulted in a record 7–1 victory to Celtic, with McPhail scoring a hat-trick.

A knee and ankle injury forced McPhail to retire the following year, after just two seasons with Celtic. He played just 57 games for the club in the major domestic competitions, however he is widely described as a "hero" or "idol" for his three goals in the 1957 final which remains a record margin of victory in the fixture. John McPhail had also scored three goals against Rangers, in the 1950 Glasgow Merchants Charity Cup; this is the only occasion in Old Firm history that brothers achieved this feat.

He was listed on the Greatest 50 Celtic Legends by the Evening Times in 2013.

=== International career ===
While never capped at full international level, McPhail was included in the Scotland squad for a game against Wales in 1955, but was forced to withdraw through injury.

He did net a hat-trick for a Scotland XI against Sunderland in a benefit match for Jimmy Mason of Third Lanark in 1953. In addition, he scored another hat-trick for a Scottish B League XI against an Irish B League XI in 1952.

== Health problems ==
According to his wife Ophelia, McPhail discovered in the 1990s that the left hemisphere of his brain was damaged. Then aged in his 70s, he had displayed signs of dementia since his 30s, and was eventually diagnosed with Alzheimer's disease. McPhail, with the support of medical specialists, associated the neurological symptoms with heading the leather football used in the 1950s, explaining how "the ball used to get very heavy when it rained – when you took that full in the forehead it nearly knocked you over."

In 1999 McPhail launched a legal case claiming he was entitled to disability payments. However, an industrial tribunal did not accept that a clash of heads during his playing career could have caused the dementia. The tribunal would not consider whether heading the ball might have contributed, as it categorised that as "part of the job [as a footballer]" and not an industrial injury. The decision was upheld by the Social Security Commissioner of Scotland.

McPhail's condition and its possible causes were discussed during a BBC Scotland investigative television programme on the subject in 2000, also featuring another former Celtic forward Jock Weir who was suffering from a similar illness. His mental health continued to deteriorate and he died in Glasgow on 4 April 2003.

== Career statistics ==
Club	Division	Season	League		National Cup		League Cup		Other		Total	
Club	Division	Season	Apps	Goals	Apps	Goals	Apps	Goals	Apps	Goals	Apps	Goals
Queen's Park	Southern Division A	1944–45	2	0	–	–	–	–	–	–	2	0
Queen's Park	Southern Division A	1945–46	8	1	–	–	–	–	2 (Note: Includes Victory Cup (1 app) and Glasgow Charity Cup (1 app).)	0	10	1
Queen's Park	Scottish Division One	1946–47	12	2	2	0	0	0	2 (Note: Includes Glasgow Cup (1 app) and Glasgow Charity Cup (1 app).)	0	16	2
Queen's Park	Total		22	3	2	0	0	0	4	0	28	3
Clyde	Scottish Division One	1947–48	14	5	1	0	6 (Note: Includes 1 match from 1948–49 competition. McPhail's only appearance of season.)	5	3 (Note: Includes Glasgow Cup (2 apps, 1 goal) and Glasgow Charity Cup (1 app, 1 goal).)	2	24	12
Clyde	Scottish Division One	1950–51	15	5	2	1	6	7	1 (Note: Includes Glasgow Cup (1 app).)	0	24	13
Clyde	Scottish Division Two	1951–52	25	36	2	1	6	2	11 (Note: Includes Saint Mungo Cup (1 app, 1 goal), Supplementary Cup (4 apps, 4 goals), Glasgow Cup (3 apps, 3 goals) and Glasgow Charity Cup (3 apps, 4 goals))	12	44	51
Clyde	Scottish Division One	1952–53	26	17	3	2	6	7	2 (Note: Includes Glasgow Cup (1 apps) and Glasgow Charity Cup (1 apps).)	0	37	26
Clyde	Scottish Division One	1953–54	15	10	0	0	6	2	1 (Note: Includes Glasgow Cup (1 apps).)	0	26	12
Clyde	Scottish Division One	1954–55	11	5	5	4	1	0	0	0	17	9
Clyde	Scottish Division One	1955–56	31	12	3	2	3	1	1 (Note: Includes Glasgow Cup (1 apps).)	0	38	15
Clyde	Total		137	90	16	10	34	24	19	14	210	138
Celtic	Scottish Division One	1956–57	13	6	4	4	10	8	1 (Note: Includes Glasgow Cup (1 app, 2 goals))	2	28	20
Celtic	Scottish Division One	1957–58	20	7	0	0	10	14	3 (Note: Includes Glasgow Cup (1 app) and Glasgow Charity Cup (2 apps).)	0	33	21
Celtic	Total		33	13	4	4	20	22	4	2	61	41
Career Total			192	106	22	14	54	46	27	16	299	182

=== Representative matches ===
Scores and results list for Scotland XI's, Scottish League XI's, and British Army XI's goal tally first.

! Date	Venue	Opponent	Goals	Result	Competition
B League Internationals
17 March 1954	Solitude, Belfast	(Northern Ireland) Irish B League XI	3	6–0	Challenge match
Unofficial Internationals
30 April 1953	Cathkin Park, Glasgow	(England) Sunderland	3	5–0	Testimonial
British Army matches
23 February 1949	Tynecastle Park, Edinburgh	Scotland	0	1–7	International trial
9 March 1949	Molineux, Wolves	(United Kingdom) Royal Air Force	0	3–3	Inter-services match
6 April 1949	Fratton Park, Portsmouth	(Belgium) Belgian Army	2		Challenge match
26 October 1949	Recreation Ground, Aldershot	(England) Aston Villa	0	2–7	Challenge match
2 November 1949	The Valley, London	(England) Football Association XI	0	1–4	Challenge match

== Honours ==
Clyde

- Scottish Division Two: 1951–52
- Supplementary Cup: 1951–52
- Glasgow Cup: 1951–52
- Glasgow Charity Cup: 1951–52

Celtic

- Scottish League Cup: 1956–57, 1957–58

== See also ==
- History of Celtic F.C.
- Jeff Astle
