= Brian Dempsey =

Brian Dempsey may refer to:

- Brian Dempsey (businessman) (born 1946/7), Scottish businessman, former Director of Celtic FC
- Brian Dempsey (politician) (born 1966), American politician, Member of the Massachusetts House of Representatives

== See also ==
- Brian Dempsie (born 1983), Scottish footballer
