= John McPhail (footballer) =

Scottish footballer

Personal information
- Full name: John McPhail
- Date of birth: 27 December 1923
- Place of birth: Possilpark, Scotland
- Date of death: 6 November 2000 (aged 76)
- Place of death: Glasgow, Scotland
- Positions: Right half; centre forward

Senior career*
Years	Team	Apps	(Gls)
- Strathclyde
1941–1956	Celtic	142	(56)

International career
1949–1953	Scotland	5	(3)
1950	Scottish League XI	2	(1)
- * Club domestic league appearances and goals

John McPhail (27 December 1923 – 6 November 2000) was a Scottish footballer who spent his entire senior playing career with Celtic. He also played for Scotland, gaining five caps. Upon his retirement from professional football, he wrote for the Daily Record and The Celtic View. He was the elder brother of Billy McPhail, also a former Celtic player.

== Playing career ==
Born in Lambhill, Glasgow, McPhail attended St Mungo's Academy before signing for Celtic, the club he supported, in October 1941 from junior side Strathclyde, aged just 17. He initially played as a right half and soon earned a nickname, "Hooky", due to his tendency to kick the football with the outside of his boot. The name stuck with him throughout his life. His early years with Celtic coincided with a period of domination by their Old Firm rivals, Rangers. In 1945 he did earn a winner's medal in the minor Victory In Europe Cup, but in 1948 was part of the Celtic team that only narrowly avoided relegation on the last day of the season.

In 1950 McPhail was transformed into a centre forward, a move that revitalised his career. During the first season following the switch he was "his side's inspiration, and the idol of the supporters", according to author and historian Tom Campbell in Glasgow Celtic 1945-1970. He captained the team to a Scottish Cup victory in 1951, scoring seven of the team's 19 goals in that competition, including the only goal of the final against Motherwell with a skilful lob over the opposing goalkeeper. This marked the first cup success for the club in 14 years; it was followed by a Coronation Cup victory in 1953 and a league championship title and Scottish Cup double in 1954 (although he played little part in the cup run). It was in this period McPhail earned five caps for Scotland, scoring three goals. He also played for the Scottish League XI.

By 1954 McPhail had begun to struggle to maintain his match fitness and he only played for the Celtic first team intermittently. Journalist Archie Macpherson recounts that McPhail admitted to him that he began to adopt the "ageing remedy of the Hungarian international Ferenc Puskás, shortening the stride and increasing the number of steps he took to lend the false impression of pace." Additional problems curtailed his career further, including a family crisis and bankruptcy as a business venture went wrong.

His younger brother Billy McPhail also played for Celtic (joining the club at almost the same point as John retired), and is widely remembered for scoring a hat-trick in their 7–1 victory over rivals Rangers in the 1957 Scottish League Cup Final. John McPhail had also scored three goals against Rangers, in the 1950 Glasgow Merchants Charity Cup final; this is the only occasion in Old Firm history that brothers have achieved this feat.

== Retirement ==
On 5 May 1956 McPhail retired from professional football, having spent 14 years with just one senior club. He made 203 appearances in the three major domestic competitions (and over 150 more in wartime and minor competitions), scoring 90 goals. He went on to work as a journalist with the Daily Record for over ten years. He then wrote for the Celtic View in the years following its launch.

McPhail was married, and had two daughters and a son, also called John. He died in Glasgow on 6 November 2000.

== See also ==
- Billy McPhail
- History of Celtic F.C.
- Celtic F.C

Preceded by Unknown	Celtic captain ??-1951	Succeeded by Sean Fallon
