= 1913–14 Celtic F.C. season =

Celtic
1913–14 season
- Manager: Willie Maley
- Stadium: Celtic Park
- Scottish First Division: 1st
- Scottish Cup: Winners

The 1913–14 Scottish football season was Celtic's 26th season of competitive football, in which they competed in the Scottish First Division. They won they third ever Scottish League and Scottish Cup 'double', taking their tally of major domestic honours to 20 (11 Leagues and 9 Cups). The Scottish Cup was won in a replay against Edinburgh club Hibernian, 4-1.

Celtic won the Glasgow Charity Cup for the third consecutive year.

== Competitions ==
=== Scottish First Division ===
==== League table ====
Pos	Team	Pld	W	D	L	GF	GA	GD	Pts
1	Celtic (C)	38	30	5	3	81	14	+67	65
2	Rangers	38	27	5	6	79	31	+48	59
3	Heart of Midlothian	38	23	8	7	70	29	+41	54
4	Morton	38	26	2	10	76	51	+25	54
5	Falkirk	38	20	9	9	69	51	+18	49

Source: "1913-1914 Division 1 - SPFL Archive". SPFL.
(C) Champions

==== Matches ====
16 August 1913 First Division	Celtic	5–1	Ayr United	Glasgow
				Stadium: Celtic Park; Attendance: 20,000

23 August 1913 First Division	Motherwell	1–1	Celtic	Motherwell
				Stadium: Fir Park; Attendance: 19,438

30 August 1913 First Division	Celtic	4–0	Falkirk	Glasgow
				Stadium: Celtic Park; Attendance: 30,000

6 September 1913 First Division	Hibernian	1–2	Celtic	Edinburgh
				Stadium: Easter Road; Attendance: 15,000

13 September 1913 First Division	Celtic	0–2	St Mirren	Glasgow
				Stadium: Celtic Park; Attendance: 6,000

15 September 1913 First Division	Hearts	2–0	Celtic	Edinburgh
				Stadium: Tynecastle Park; Attendance: 16,500

20 September 1913 First Division	Morton	0–4	Celtic	Greenock
				Stadium: Cappielow Park; Attendance: 10,000

29 September 1913 First Division	Celtic	2–0	Clyde	Glasgow
				Stadium: Celtic Park; Attendance: 20,000

4 October 1913 First Division	Celtic	2–1	Aberdeen	Glasgow
				Stadium: Celtic Park; Attendance: 17,000

11 October 1913 First Division	Aberdeen	0–1	Celtic	Aberdeen
				Stadium: Pittodrie Park; Attendance: 11,000

18 October 1913 First Division	Celtic	1–0	Dundee	Glasgow
				Stadium: Celtic Park; Attendance: 28,000

25 October 1913 First Division	Rangers	0–2	Celtic	Glasgow
				Stadium: Ibrox Park; Attendance: 63,500

1 November 1913 First Division	Celtic	4–0	Kilmarnock	Glasgow
				Stadium: Celtic Park; Attendance: 12,000

8 November 1913 First Division	Queen's Park	0–2	Celtic	Glasgow
				Stadium: Hampden Park; Attendance: 18,000

15 November 1913 First Division	Dumbarton	0–4	Celtic	Dumbarton
				Stadium: Boghead Park; Attendance: 10,000

22 November 1913 First Division	Celtic	1–0	Hamilton Academical	Glasgow
				Stadium: Celtic Park; Attendance: 15,000

29 November 1913 First Division	Airdrieonians	0–1	Celtic	Airdrie
				Stadium: Broomfield Park; Attendance: 18,000

6 December 1913 First Division	Celtic	3–0	Third Lanark	Glasgow
				Stadium: Celtic Park; Attendance: 10,000

13 December 1913 First Division	Raith Rovers	1–2	Celtic	Kirkcaldy
				Stadium: Stark's Park; Attendance: 12,000

20 December 1913 First Division	Celtic	0–0	Motherwell	Glasgow
				Stadium: Celtic Park; Attendance: 16,000

27 December 1913 First Division	Ayr United	0–6	Celtic	Ayr
				Stadium: Somerset Park; Attendance: 6,000

1 January 1914 First Division	Celtic	4–0	Rangers	Glasgow
				Stadium: Celtic Park; Attendance: 83,000

3 January 1914 First Division	Partick Thistle	0–0	Celtic	Glasgow
				Stadium: Firhill Park; Attendance: 29,000

5 January 1914 First Division	Clyde	0–1	Celtic	Glasgow
			Shawfield Stadium	Attendance: 9,000

10 January 1914 First Division	Celtic	4–0	Dumbarton	Glasgow
				Stadium: Celtic Park; Attendance: 11,000

17 January 1914 First Division	Dundee	0–1	Celtic	Dundee
				Stadium: Dens Park; Attendance: 20,000

24 January 1914 First Division	Celtic	1–0	Airdrieonians	Glasgow
				Stadium: Celtic Park; Attendance: 16,000

31 January 1914 First Division	St Mirren	0–3	Celtic	Paisley
				Stadium: St Mirren Park, Love Street; Attendance: 16,000

14 February 1914 First Division	Celtic	3–0	Morton	Glasgow
				Stadium: Celtic Park

28 February 1914 First Division	Falkirk	1–0	Celtic	Falkirk
				Stadium: Brockville Park; Attendance: 10,000

24 March 1914 First Division	Celtic	0–0	Hearts	Glasgow
				Stadium: Celtic Park; Attendance: 30,000

1 April 1914 First Division	Third Lanark	1–3	Celtic	Glasgow
				Stadium: Cathkin Park; Attendance: 8,000

8 April 1914 First Division	Kilmarnock	0–1	Celtic	Kilmarnock
				Stadium: Rugby Park; Attendance: 5,000

13 April 1914 First Division	Celtic	5–0	Queen's Park	Glasgow
				Stadium: Celtic Park; Attendance: 14,000

18 April 1914 First Division	Celtic	3–0	Hibernian	Glasgow
				Stadium: Celtic Park; Attendance: 12,000

24 April 1914 First Division	Hamilton Academical	1–2	Celtic	Hamilton
				Stadium: Douglas Park; Attendance: 7,000

25 April 1914 First Division	Celtic	1–1	Partick Thistle	Glasgow
				Stadium: Celtic Park; Attendance: 8,000

29 April 1914 First Division	Celtic	2–1	Raith Rovers	Glasgow
				Stadium: Celtic Park; Attendance: 5,000

=== Scottish Cup ===
7 February 1914 Second round	Clyde	0–0	Celtic	Glasgow
				Stadium: Shawfield Stadium; Attendance: 46,000

10 February 1914 Second round replay	Celtic	2–0	Clyde	Glasgow
				Stadium: Celtic Park; Attendance: 40,000

21 February 1914 Third round	Forfar Athletic	0–5	Celtic	Forfar
				Stadium: Station Park; Attendance: 6,000

7 March 1914 Fourth round	Motherwell	1–3	Celtic	Motherwell
				Stadium: Fir Park; Attendance: 16,430

28 March 1914 Semi-final	Third Lanark	0–2	Celtic	Glasgow
				Stadium: Ibrox Park; Attendance: 46,000

11 April 1914 Final	Celtic	0–0	Hibernian	Glasgow
				Stadium: Ibrox Park; Attendance: 56,000

16 April 1914 Final Replay	Celtic	4–1	Hibernian	Glasgow
				Stadium: Ibrox Park; Attendance: 36,000
