= 1956–57 Scottish League Cup =

Tournament details
- Country: Scotland

Final positions
- Champions: Celtic
- Runners-up: Partick Thistle

The 1956–57 Scottish League Cup was the 11th season of Scotland's second football knockout competition. The competition was won by Celtic, who defeated Partick Thistle in the Final.

== First round ==
=== Group 1 ===
Team	Pld	W	D	L	GF	GA	GR	Pts
Dundee	6	5	1	0	16	5	3.200	11
Raith Rovers	6	3	1	2	12	10	1.200	7
Motherwell	6	2	0	4	12	10	1.200	4
Airdrieonians	6	1	0	5	9	24	0.375	2

Home team	Score	Away team	Date
Motherwell	0–1	Dundee	11 August 1956
Raith Rovers	4–2	Airdrieonians	11 August 1956
Airdrieonians	1–3	Motherwell	15 August 1956
Dundee	1–0	Raith Rovers	15 August 1956
Dundee	3–1	Airdrieonians	18 August 1956
Raith Rovers	4–2	Motherwell	18 August 1956
Airdrieonians	3–1	Raith Rovers	25 August 1956
Dundee	2–1	Motherwell	25 August 1956
Motherwell	6–1	Airdrieonians	29 August 1956
Raith Rovers	2–2	Dundee	29 August 1956
Airdrieonians	1–7	Dundee	1 September 1956
Motherwell	0–1	Raith Rovers	1 September 1956

=== Group 2 ===
Team	Pld	W	D	L	GF	GA	GR	Pts
Celtic	6	5	1	0	10	5	2.000	11
Rangers	6	4	1	1	18	6	3.000	9
Aberdeen	6	1	0	5	11	18	0.611	2
East Fife	6	1	0	5	5	15	0.333	2

Home team	Score	Away team	Date
Aberdeen	1–2	Celtic	11 August 1956
Rangers	3–0	East Fife	11 August 1956
Celtic	2–1	Rangers	15 August 1956
East Fife	2–1	Aberdeen	15 August 1956
Aberdeen	2–6	Rangers	18 August 1956
Celtic	2–1	East Fife	18 August 1956
Celtic	3–2	Aberdeen	25 August 1956
East Fife	1–4	Rangers	25 August 1956
Aberdeen	4–1	East Fife	29 August 1956
Rangers	0–0	Celtic	29 August 1956
East Fife	0–1	Celtic	1 September 1956
Rangers	4–1	Aberdeen	1 September 1956

=== Group 3 ===
Team	Pld	W	D	L	GF	GA	GR	Pts
Dunfermline Athletic	6	3	2	1	10	5	2.000	8
St Mirren	6	2	3	1	9	6	1.500	7
Queen of the South	6	1	3	2	6	8	0.750	5
Kilmarnock	6	1	2	3	8	14	0.571	4

Home team	Score	Away team	Date
Kilmarnock	0–0	Dunfermline Athletic	11 August 1956
Queen of the South	0–0	St Mirren	11 August 1956
Dunfermline Athletic	2–1	Queen of the South	15 August 1956
St Mirren	2–2	Kilmarnock	15 August 1956
Kilmarnock	2–3	Queen of the South	18 August 1956
St Mirren	2–0	Dunfermline Athletic	18 August 1956
Dunfermline Athletic	5–1	Kilmarnock	25 August 1956
St Mirren	1–1	Queen of the South	25 August 1956
Kilmarnock	1–4	St Mirren	29 August 1956
Queen of the South	1–1	Dunfermline Athletic	29 August 1956
Dunfermline Athletic	2–0	St Mirren	1 September 1956
Queen of the South	0–2	Kilmarnock	1 September 1956

=== Group 4 ===
Team	Pld	W	D	L	GF	GA	GR	Pts
Partick Thistle	6	4	2	0	15	6	2.500	10
Heart of Midlothian	6	3	2	1	17	8	2.125	8
Falkirk	6	2	1	3	6	10	0.600	5
Hibernian	6	0	1	5	5	19	0.263	1

Home team	Score	Away team	Date
Falkirk	0–2	Partick Thistle	11 August 1956
Heart of Midlothian	6–1	Hibernian	11 August 1956
Hibernian	0–1	Falkirk	15 August 1956
Partick Thistle	3–1	Heart of Midlothian	15 August 1956
Heart of Midlothian	5–0	Falkirk	18 August 1956
Partick Thistle	4–1	Hibernian	18 August 1956
Hibernian	1–2	Heart of Midlothian	25 August 1956
Partick Thistle	2–0	Falkirk	25 August 1956
Falkirk	4–0	Hibernian	29 August 1956
Heart of Midlothian	2–2	Partick Thistle	29 August 1956
Falkirk	1–1	Heart of Midlothian	1 September 1956
Hibernian	2–2	Partick Thistle	1 September 1956

=== Group 5 ===
Team	Pld	W	D	L	GF	GA	GR	Pts
Brechin City	6	4	1	1	20	8	2.500	9
Hamilton Academical	6	3	1	2	14	14	1.000	7
Dumbarton	6	2	1	3	15	22	0.682	5
Alloa Athletic	6	1	1	4	9	14	0.643	3

Home team	Score	Away team	Date
Alloa Athletic	3–1	Hamilton Academical	11 August 1956
Dumbarton	1–8	Brechin City	11 August 1956
Brechin City	3–1	Alloa Athletic	15 August 1956
Hamilton Academical	5–3	Dumbarton	15 August 1956
Dumbarton	1–1	Alloa Athletic	18 August 1956
Hamilton Academical	1–1	Brechin City	18 August 1956
Brechin City	3–4	Dumbarton	25 August 1956
Hamilton Academical	3–2	Alloa Athletic	25 August 1956
Alloa Athletic	1–3	Brechin City	29 August 1956
Dumbarton	3–4	Hamilton Academical	29 August 1956
Alloa Athletic	1–3	Dumbarton	1 September 1956
Brechin City	2–0	Hamilton Academical	1 September 1956

=== Group 6 ===
Team	Pld	W	D	L	GF	GA	GR	Pts
Cowdenbeath	6	4	1	1	11	4	2.750	9
Morton	6	2	3	1	8	5	1.600	7
Stranraer	6	1	2	3	9	12	0.750	4
Berwick Rangers	6	1	2	3	6	13	0.462	4

Home team	Score	Away team	Date
Cowdenbeath	1–1	Stranraer	11 August 1956
Morton	1–1	Berwick Rangers	11 August 1956
Berwick Rangers	0–3	Cowdenbeath	15 August 1956
Stranraer	1–4	Morton	15 August 1956
Cowdenbeath	0–1	Morton	18 August 1956
Stranraer	5–2	Berwick Rangers	18 August 1956
Berwick Rangers	1–1	Morton	25 August 1956
Stranraer	1–3	Cowdenbeath	25 August 1956
Cowdenbeath	3–1	Berwick Rangers	29 August 1956
Morton	1–1	Stranraer	29 August 1956
Berwick Rangers	1–0	Stranraer	1 September 1956
Morton	0–1	Cowdenbeath	1 September 1956

=== Group 7 ===
Team	Pld	W	D	L	GF	GA	GR	Pts
Clyde	6	5	1	0	19	5	3.800	11
St Johnstone	6	3	1	2	7	12	0.583	7
Queen's Park	6	2	1	3	7	7	1.000	5
Stirling Albion	6	0	1	5	1	10	0.100	1

Home team	Score	Away team	Date
Clyde	2–1	Stirling Albion	11 August 1956
St Johnstone	2–1	Queen's Park	11 August 1956
Queen's Park	0–1	Clyde	15 August 1956
Stirling Albion	0–0	St Johnstone	15 August 1956
St Johnstone	1–6	Clyde	18 August 1956
Stirling Albion	0–2	Queen's Park	18 August 1956
Queen's Park	0–2	St Johnstone	25 August 1956
Stirling Albion	0–3	Clyde	25 August 1956
Clyde	2–2	Queen's Park	29 August 1956
St Johnstone	1–0	Stirling Albion	29 August 1956
Clyde	5–1	St Johnstone	1 September 1956
Queen's Park	2–0	Stirling Albion	1 September 1956

=== Group 8 ===
Team	Pld	W	D	L	GF	GA	GR	Pts
Dundee United	6	3	1	2	16	11	1.455	7
Ayr United	6	2	3	1	14	13	1.077	7
Stenhousemuir	6	3	1	2	13	18	0.722	7
Third Lanark	6	1	1	4	15	16	0.938	3

Home team	Score	Away team	Date
Dundee United	6–1	Ayr United	11 August 1956
Third Lanark	8–2	Stenhousemuir	11 August 1956
Ayr United	3–3	Third Lanark	15 August 1956
Stenhousemuir	3–2	Dundee United	15 August 1956
Stenhousemuir	1–1	Ayr United	18 August 1956
Third Lanark	1–2	Dundee United	18 August 1956
Ayr United	1–1	Dundee United	25 August 1956
Stenhousemuir	2–1	Third Lanark	25 August 1956
Dundee United	3–4	Stenhousemuir	29 August 1956
Third Lanark	1–5	Ayr United	29 August 1956
Ayr United	3–1	Stenhousemuir	1 September 1956
Dundee United	2–1	Third Lanark	1 September 1956

=== Group 9 ===
Team	Pld	W	D	L	GF	GA	GR	Pts
Arbroath	4	3	0	1	13	3	4.333	6
Albion Rovers	4	3	0	1	18	10	1.800	6
Forfar Athletic	4	2	0	2	7	8	0.875	4
East Stirlingshire	4	2	0	2	6	12	0.500	4
Montrose	4	0	0	4	6	17	0.353	0

Home team	Score	Away team	Date
Albion Rovers	2–1	Arbroath	11 August 1956
Montrose	2–3	Forfar Athletic	11 August 1956
East Stirlingshire	3–0	Montrose	15 August 1956
Forfar Athletic	4–2	Albion Rovers	15 August 1956
Albion Rovers	9–2	East Stirlingshire	18 August 1956
Arbroath	3–0	Forfar Athletic	18 August 1956
East Stirlingshire	0–3	Arbroath	25 August 1956
Montrose	3–5	Albion Rovers	25 August 1956
Arbroath	6–1	Montrose	1 September 1956
Forfar Athletic	0–1	East Stirlingshire	1 September 1956

== Supplementary round ==
=== First leg ===
Home team	Score	Away team	Date
Arbroath	2–0	Dundee United	3 September 1956

=== Second leg ===
Home team	Score	Away team	Date	Agg
Dundee United	5–0	Arbroath	5 September 1956	5–2

== Quarter-finals ==
=== First leg ===
Home team	Score	Away team	Date
Brechin City	3–2	Clyde	12 September 1956
Celtic	6–0	Dunfermline Athletic	12 September 1956
Cowdenbeath	1–2	Partick Thistle	12 September 1956
Dundee	7–3	Dundee United	12 September 1956

=== Second leg ===
Home team	Score	Away team	Date	Agg
Clyde	3–1	Brechin City	15 September 1956	5–4
Dundee United	2–1	Dundee	15 September 1956	5–8
Dunfermline Athletic	3–0	Celtic	15 September 1956	3–6
Partick Thistle	2–1	Cowdenbeath	18 September 1956	4–2

== Semi-finals ==
=== Ties ===
Home team	Score	Away team	Date
Celtic	2–0	Clyde	6 October 1956
Dundee	0–0	Partick Thistle	6 October 1956

=== Replay ===
Home team	Score	Away team	Date
Partick Thistle	3–2	Dundee	9 October 1956

== Final ==
27 October 1956

Celtic	0–0	Partick Thistle

Hampden Park, Glasgow
Attendance: 59,000

=== Replay ===
31 October 1956

Celtic	3–0	Partick Thistle
Collins; McPhail; McPhail

Hampden Park, Glasgow
Attendance: 31,000
