= Brian Dempsey (businessman) =

Scottish businessman (born 1947)

- Born: 1947 (age 78–79); Scotland
- Occupation: Businessman
- Known for: Former Celtic FC director; political donor

Brian Dempsey (born 1947) is a Scottish businessman.

He was a major funder of the Scottish Labour Party but latterly switched allegiance and donated to support Neil Gray (MP for Airdrie and Shotts) and the SNP. He was also briefly a director of Celtic FC in 1990. He supported Fergus McCann's efforts to take over Celtic in the 1990s. He was declared bankrupt in June 2011, with debts in excess of £10 million.

Dempsey currently lives in Scotland after brief spells in Miami and the Caribbean. His father was James Dempsey, a Labour MP in Scotland.
