= 1956–57 Scottish Division One =

51st season of top-tier football league in Scotland

Scottish Division One
- Season: 1956–57
- Champions: Rangers
- Relegated: Dunfermline Athletic; Ayr United

The 1956–57 Scottish Division One was won by Rangers by two points over nearest rival Heart of Midlothian. Dunfermline Athletic and Ayr United finished 17th and 18th respectively and were relegated to the 1957–58 Scottish Division Two.

== League table ==
Pos	Team	Pld	W	D	L	GF	GA	GR	Pts
1	Rangers	34	26	3	5	96	48	2.000	55
2	Heart of Midlothian	34	24	5	5	81	48	1.688	53
3	Kilmarnock	34	16	10	8	57	39	1.462	42
4	Raith Rovers	34	16	7	11	84	58	1.448	39
5	Celtic	34	15	8	11	58	43	1.349	38
6	Aberdeen	34	18	2	14	79	59	1.339	38
7	Motherwell	34	16	5	13	72	66	1.091	37
8	Partick Thistle	34	13	8	13	53	51	1.039	34
9	Hibernian	34	12	9	13	69	56	1.232	33
10	Dundee	34	13	6	15	55	61	0.902	32
11	Airdrieonians	34	13	4	17	77	89	0.865	30
12	St Mirren	34	12	6	16	58	72	0.806	30
13	Queen's Park	34	11	7	16	55	59	0.932	29
14	Falkirk	34	10	8	16	51	70	0.729	28
15	East Fife	34	10	6	18	59	82	0.720	26
16	Queen of the South	34	10	5	19	54	96	0.563	25
17	Dunfermline Athletic	34	9	6	19	54	74	0.730	24
18	Ayr United	34	7	5	22	48	89	0.539	19

Source: RSSSF

== Results ==
Home \ Away	ABE	AIR	AYR	CEL	DND	DNF	EFI	FAL	HOM	HIB	KIL	MOT	PAR	QOS	QPA	RAI	RAN	STM
Aberdeen		2–3	2–2	0–1	2–1	3–2	1–0	3–1	2–3	3–1	1–3	2–3	2–0	5–1	2–1	1–0	1–2	4–0
Airdrieonians	1–5		4–1	3–7	3–2	3–1	5–2	2–3	3–4	5–3	0–1	1–4	0–1	4–0	2–0	2–2	3–3	4–1
Ayr United	1–6	4–1		1–3	0–1	2–1	2–2	6–1	0–2	2–3	0–2	1–2	2–1	0–1	4–4	0–3	1–0	1–2
Celtic	2–1	3–0	4–0		1–1	3–1	4–0	4–0	1–1	2–1	1–1	2–1	1–1	0–0	2–0	1–1	0–2	2–3
Dundee	4–2	2–1	5–0	2–1		2–0	0–1	1–2	0–3	0–3	1–1	3–1	5–1	5–2	3–1	3–0	1–3	1–1
Dunfermline Athletic	1–3	3–3	1–3	0–1	1–1		1–4	2–1	2–3	1–3	2–1	3–1	2–1	4–3	3–0	2–2	3–4	0–2
East Fife	4–3	4–2	2–2	2–0	2–0	3–4		1–1	1–3	1–6	0–0	1–2	2–1	3–1	0–1	2–3	0–3	5–2
Falkirk	2–5	4–1	2–3	0–1	1–1	0–1	4–3		0–2	0–1	2–0	1–2	4–1	3–2	1–1	0–4	0–2	4–5
Heart of Midlothian	3–0	2–0	2–2	3–1	2–1	5–1	2–5	1–1		0–2	3–2	3–2	1–0	3–1	6–1	2–1	0–1	2–2
Hibernian	4–1	6–0	3–0	3–3	1–1	0–0	4–0	6–1	2–3		0–0	1–1	2–0	1–1	1–1	1–4	2–3	1–1
Kilmarnock	2–1	3–4	4–1	0–0	4–0	0–0	1–1	1–1	4–1	2–1		2–2	1–1	1–3	1–0	3–0	3–2	3–2
Motherwell	2–5	2–0	4–2	1–0	4–2	3–2	2–2	1–3	1–3	3–0	0–2		2–2	7–0	4–2	0–2	2–5	3–0
Partick Thistle	1–2	2–1	3–1	3–1	5–0	3–0	2–1	2–1	2–2	3–0	2–1	2–3		2–1	0–0	1–1	0–3	2–0
Queen of the South	2–2	3–3	5–1	4–3	3–1	3–2	4–2	1–2	0–2	2–0	0–3	2–2	3–0		1–6	1–5	0–3	2–0
Queen's Park	0–2	0–2	2–0	2–0	2–0	1–3	3–0	1–1	0–1	2–1	1–2	1–0	1–1	7–0		1–0	4–6	5–0
Raith Rovers	3–2	4–6	5–2	3–1	1–2	2–2	4–1	2–3	2–3	1–1	4–2	3–2	0–3	3–1	3–0		5–1	7–0
Rangers	3–1	3–2	3–1	2–0	4–0	2–1	6–1	1–1	5–3	5–3	0–1	2–3	4–1	4–0	3–3	3–1		1–0
St Mirren	0–2	2–3	1–0	0–2	2–3	3–2	3–1	0–0	0–2	4–2	2–0	4–0	1–1	7–1	4–1	3–3	1–2	

Legend: Blue = home team win; Yellow = draw; Red = away team win.
