= The Celtic View =

Scottish football club magazine

The front cover of The Celtic View Issue 1, 11 August 1965

The Celtic View is the official weekly magazine of Celtic Football Club, whose headquarters are located in Glasgow, Scotland.

The first publication to be fully related to the Scottish team, it is also the oldest football club magazine in the United Kingdom. Since its foundation in 1965, The Celtic View has represented a comprehensive guide for supporters to the state and the environment of the club, as it includes articles about Celtic's history, extensive interviews to prominent members of the club's first team, reserves team, women's team and general board (including captains, managers and directors), as well as a letter section that is open to the messages and requests of fans.

== History and profile ==
Launched in August 1965 as a four-page newspaper, The Celtic View was the brainchild of Jack McGinn, later Chairman of Celtic itself, who at the time was working in the circulation department of Beaverbrook Newspapers. McGinn himself edited the paper for the first few years, with circulation initially reaching around 26,000 copies. Throughout the years, The Celtic View has been reworked as a 72-page glossy magazine with over 6,000 weekly readers, and has become the top-selling club magazine in the United Kingdom.

In 2005, Celtic entered into a new agreement with CRE8, an Oxfordshire-based publisher of sports magazines and match programmes, to publish the magazine, although the content is still produced by The Celtic View staff.

In the spring of 2020, the magazine saw a temporary cease of production due to the outbreak of the COVID-19 pandemic in the UK. However, in August 2021, Celtic itself announced the restart of the production activities for the magazine, which was turned into a 100-page, quarterly publication.

More recently there has been the launch of the Celtic View Hub on the official Celtic website which hosts all the latest features.

== See also ==
- Celtic TV, official online channel
