= Celtic F.C. =

Association football club in Scotland

Celtic
- Full name: The Celtic Football Club
- Nicknames: The Bhoys; The Celts; The Hoops
- Founded: 6 November 1887; 139 years ago
- Ground: Celtic Park
- Capacity: 60,411
- Coordinates: 55°50′59″N 4°12′20″W
- Owner: Celtic PLC (LSE: CCP)
- Chairman: Brian Wilson (interim)
- Manager: Martin O'Neill
- League: Scottish Premiership
- 2025–26: Scottish Premiership, 1st of 12 (champions)
- Website: celticfc.com
Home colours	Away colours	Third colours

Celtic have been in the Scottish top division since the inaugural Scottish Football League season in 1890.

The Celtic Football Club, commonly known as Celtic (/ˈsɛltɪk/), (Note: The club is also sometimes erroneously referred to as Glasgow Celtic in foreign media.) is a professional football club in Glasgow, Scotland. The team competes in the Scottish Premiership, the top division of Scottish football. The club was founded in 1887 (Note: Although the club was "formally constituted" in 1887, no matches were played until 1888. The latter date is listed by the club as their foundation date; for example, on the club badge.) with the purpose of alleviating poverty in the Irish–Scots population in the city's East End area. They played their first match in May 1888, a friendly match against Rangers which Celtic won 5–2. Celtic established themselves within Scottish football, winning six successive league titles during the first decade of the 20th century. The club enjoyed their greatest successes during the 1960s and 70s under Jock Stein, when they won nine consecutive league titles and the 1967 European Cup. Celtic have played in green and white throughout their history, adopting in 1903 the hoops that have been used ever since.

Celtic are one of only seven clubs in the world to have won over 100 trophies, with 122 major honours as of May 2026, the most of any European club and the second-most in the world. (Note: Behind Al-Ahly of Cairo, Egypt, with 127.) The club has won the Scottish league championship a record 56 times, most recently in 2025–26, the Scottish Cup a record 43 times and the Scottish League Cup 22 times. The club's greatest season was 1966–67, when Celtic became the first British team to win the European Cup, also winning the Scottish league championship, the Scottish Cup, the League Cup and the Glasgow Cup. Celtic also reached the 1970 European Cup final and the 2003 UEFA Cup final, losing in both.

Celtic have a fierce long-standing rivalry with Rangers, and together the clubs are known as "The Old Firm". However, these matches are also known as the "Glasgow derby" by many Celtic fans. Their matches against each other are regarded as among the world's biggest football derbies. The club's fanbase was estimated in 2003 as being around 9 million worldwide and there are more than 160 Celtic supporters clubs in over 20 countries. An estimated 80,000 fans travelled to Seville for the 2003 UEFA Cup final, and their "extraordinarily loyal and sporting behaviour" in spite of defeat earned the fans Fair Play awards from both FIFA and UEFA.

== History ==
=== Founding and early years ===
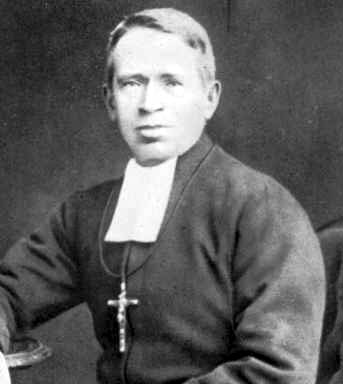
Brother Walfrid, founder of Celtic FC

Celtic Football Club was formally constituted at a meeting in St. Mary's church hall in East Rose Street (now Forbes Street), Calton, Glasgow, by Irish Marist Brother Walfrid on 6 November 1887, with the purpose of alleviating poverty in the East End of Glasgow by raising money for the charity Walfrid had instituted, the Poor Children's Dinner Table. Walfrid's move to establish the club as a means of fund-raising was largely inspired by the example of Hibernian, which was formed out of the immigrant Irish population a few years earlier in Edinburgh. Walfrid's own suggestion of the name Celtic (pronounced Seltik) was intended to reflect the club's Irish and Scottish roots and was adopted at the same meeting. The club has the official nickname, The Bhoys. However, according to the Celtic press office, the newly established club was known to many as "the bold boys". A postcard from the early 20th century that pictured the team and read "The Bould Bhoys" is the first known example of the unique spelling. The extra h imitates the spelling system of Gaelic, wherein the letter b is often accompanied by the letter h.

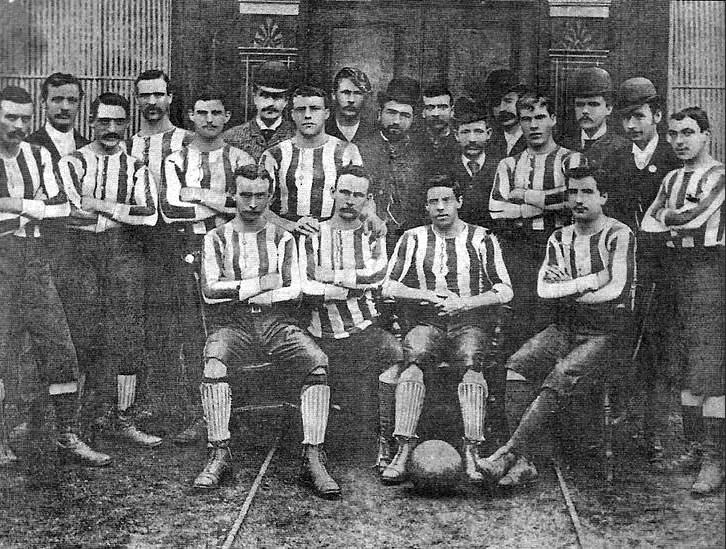
A team photo from the early days of the club (around 1889), before the adoption of the hooped jerseys

On 28 May 1888, Celtic played their first official match against Rangers and won 5–2 in what was described as a "friendly encounter". Neil McCallum scored Celtic's first goal. Celtic's first kit consisted of a white shirt with a green collar, black shorts, and emerald green socks. The original club crest was a simple green cross on a red oval background. In 1889 Celtic reached the final of the Scottish Cup in their first season taking part in the competition, but lost 2–1 to Third Lanark. Celtic reached the final again in 1892 and this time were victorious after defeating Queen's Park 5–1, the club's first major honour. Several months later the club moved to its new ground, Celtic Park, and in the following season won the Scottish League Championship for the first time. In 1895 Celtic set the League record for the highest home score when they beat Dundee 11–0.

=== Early to mid 1900s ===
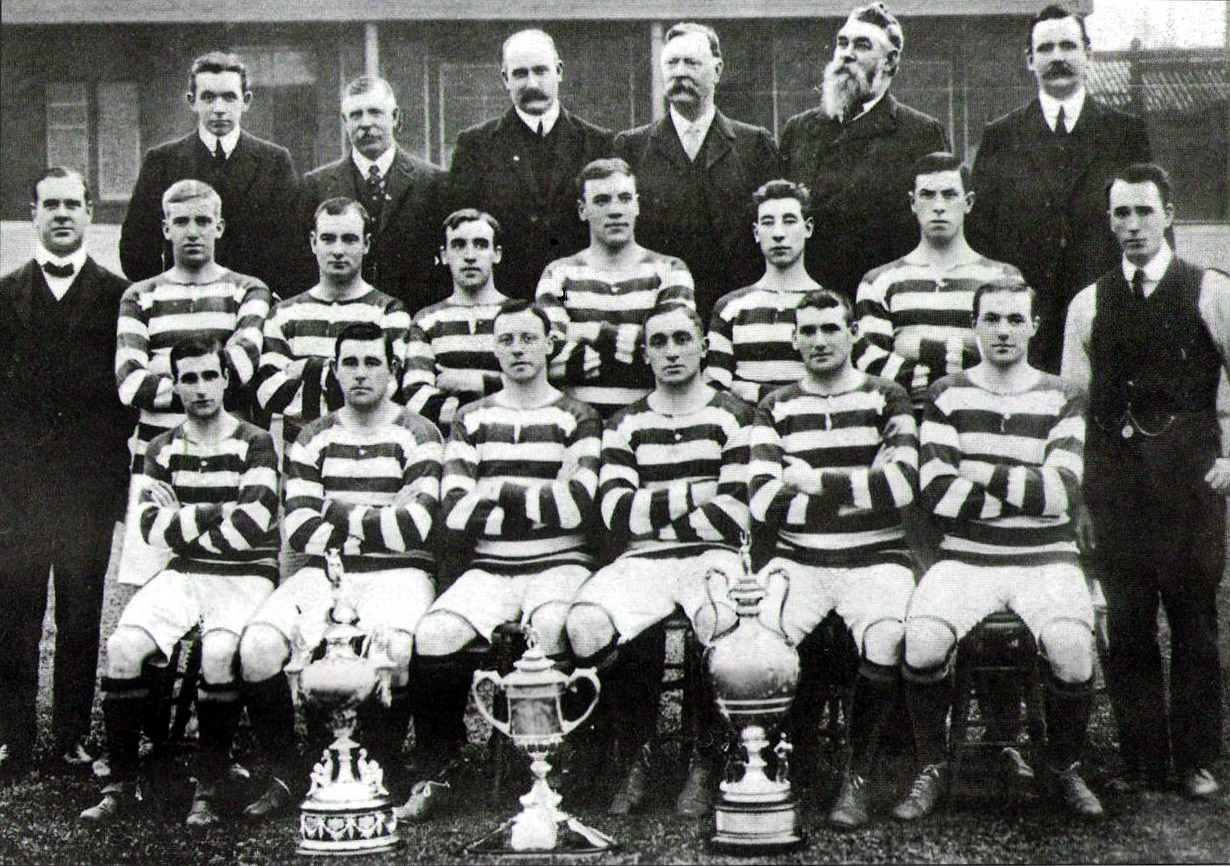
The Celtic team of 1908, under 'secretary-manager' Willy Maley.

In 1897, the club became a private limited company and Willie Maley was appointed as the first "secretary-manager". Between 1905 and 1910, Celtic won the Scottish League Championship six times in a row. They also won the Scottish Cup in both 1907 and 1908, the first times a Scottish club had ever won the double. During World War I, Celtic won the league four times in a row, including 62 matches unbeaten between November 1915 and April 1917. The mid-1920s saw the emergence of Jimmy McGrory as one of the most prolific goalscorers in British football history; over a sixteen-year playing career, he scored 550 goals in 547 games (including 16 goals for Clydebank during a season on loan in 1923–24), a British goal-scoring record to this day. In January 1940, Willie Maley's retirement was announced. He was 71 years old and had served the club in varying roles for nearly 52 years, initially as a player and then as secretary-manager. Jimmy McStay became manager of the club in February 1940. He spent over five years in this role, although due to the Second World War no official competitive league football took place during this time. The Scottish Football League and Scottish Cup were suspended and in their place regional league competitions were set up. Celtic did not do particularly well during the war years, but did win the Victory in Europe Cup held in May 1945 as a one-off football match to celebrate Victory in Europe Day.

Ex-player and captain Jimmy McGrory took over as manager in 1945. Under McGrory, Celtic defeated Arsenal, Manchester United and Hibernian to win the Coronation Cup, a one-off tournament held in May 1953 to commemorate the coronation of Elizabeth II. He also led them to a League and Cup double in 1954. On 19 October 1957, Celtic defeated Rangers in the final of the Scottish League Cup at Hampden Park in Glasgow, retaining the trophy they had won for the first time the previous year; the 7–1 scoreline remains the highest-scoring British domestic cup final. The years that followed, however, saw Celtic struggle and the club won no more trophies under McGrory.

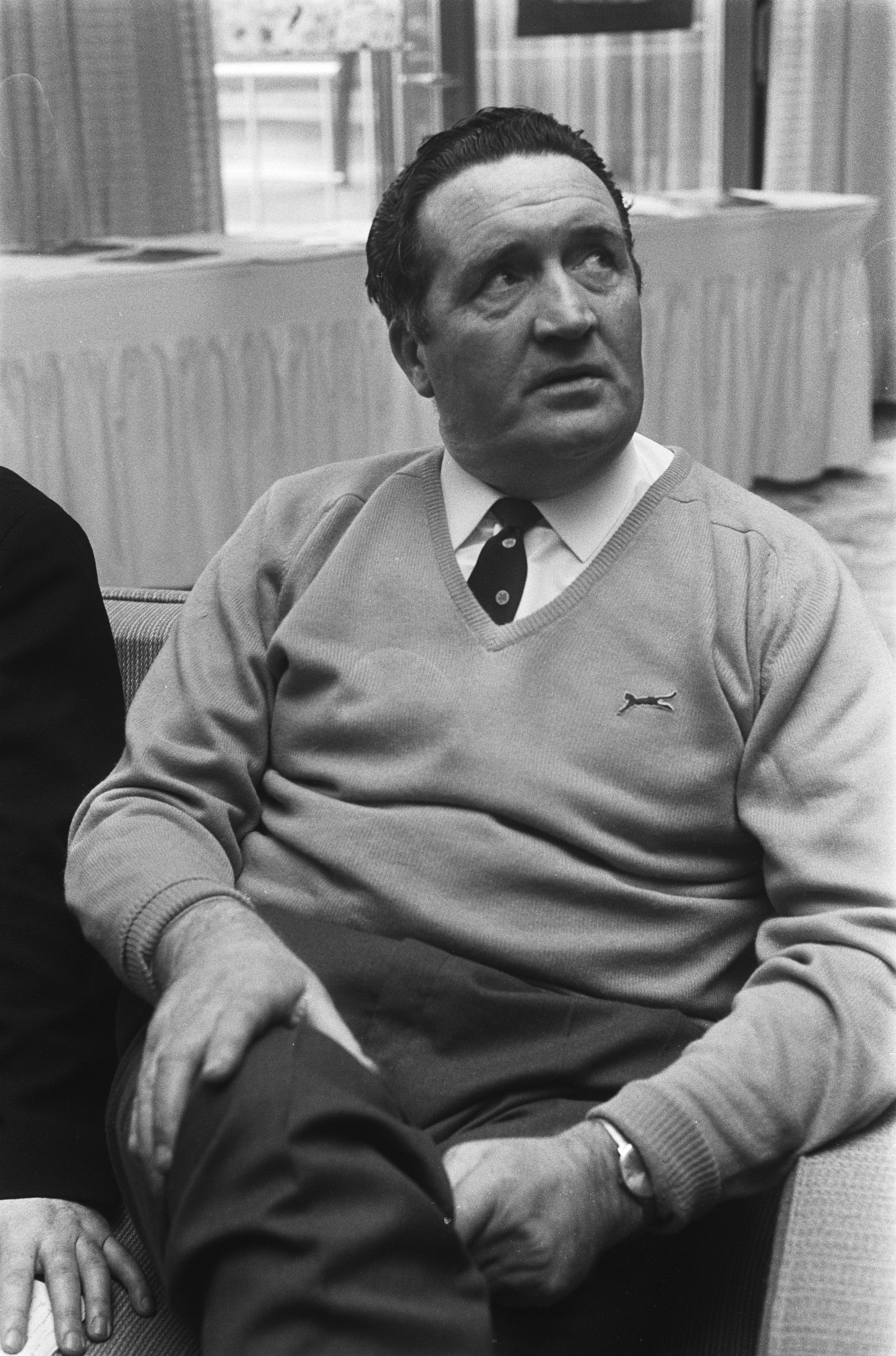
Jock Stein in an Amsterdam hotel, ahead of a European Cup quarter-final against Ajax (1971)

=== Jock Stein Era and European Cup Win ===

1967 European Cup Final line-up
(The Lisbon Lions, all born within a 30 mile radius of Glasgow)

Former Celtic captain Jock Stein succeeded McGrory in 1965. He won the Scottish Cup in his first few months at the club, and then led them to the League title the following season.

1967 was Celtic's annus mirabilis. The club won every competition they entered: the Scottish League, the Scottish Cup, the Scottish League Cup, the Glasgow Cup, and the European Cup. With this haul, Celtic became the first club to win the European Treble and remains the only club to win the fabled Quadruple. Under the leadership of Stein, the club defeated Inter Milan 2–1 at the Estádio Nacional in Lisbon, on 25 May 1967 to become the first British team, and indeed the first from outside Spain, Portugal and Italy to win the European Cup. They remain the only Scottish team to have reached the final. The players that day, all of whom were born within 30 miles of Glasgow, subsequently became known as the "Lisbon Lions". The following season Celtic lost to Racing Club of Argentina in the Intercontinental Cup.

Celtic reached the European Cup final again in 1970, but were beaten 2–1 by Feyenoord at the San Siro in Milan. The club continued to dominate Scottish football in the early 1970s, and their Scottish Championship win in 1974 was their ninth consecutive league title, equalling the joint world record held at the time by MTK Budapest and CSKA Sofia. Jock Stein departed the club in 1978, being replaced by Billy McNeill.

=== Financial uncertainty ===
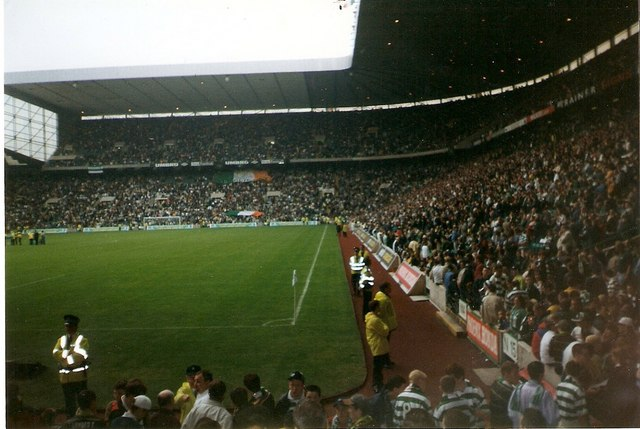
Celtic Park on 9 May, 1988, the day Celtic won the 1997–98 Scottish Premier Division

Celtic enjoyed further domestic success in the 1980s, and in their Centenary season of 1987–88 won a Scottish Premier Division and Scottish Cup double.

The club endured a slump in the early 1990s, culminating in the Bank of Scotland informing directors on 3 March 1994 that it was calling in the receivers as a result of the club exceeding a £5 million overdraft. However, expatriate businessman Fergus McCann wrested control of the club, and ousted the family dynasties which had controlled Celtic since its foundation. According to media reports, McCann took over the club minutes before it was to be declared bankrupt. McCann reconstituted the club business as a public limited company – Celtic PLC – and oversaw the redevelopment of Celtic Park into a 60,832 all-seater stadium. In 1998 Celtic won the title again under Dutchman Wim Jansen and prevented Rangers from beating their nine-in-a-row record.

=== 2000s and UEFA Cup Final ===
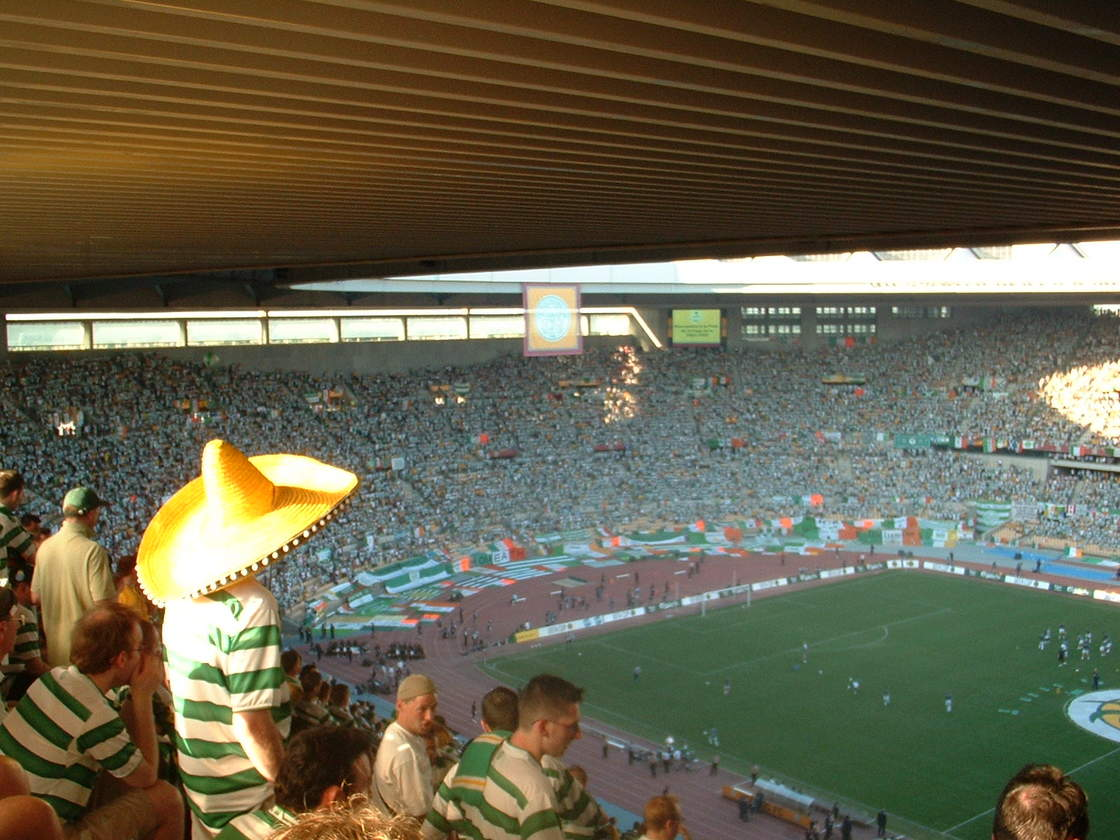
Celtic fans in Seville for the 2003 UEFA Cup final. Over 80,000 Celtic fans went to Seville, many without tickets.

Martin O'Neill, a former European Cup winner as a player with Nottingham Forest, took charge of the club in June 2000. O'Neill's first Old Firm game, in late August 2000, ended in a 6–2 victory for Celtic. It was their biggest victory over Rangers since the 1957 Scottish League Cup final. In that first season, O'Neill won a domestic treble with Celtic, the first time this had been achieved since 1968–69. Celtic then retained the league title in 2001–02, the first time since 1982 that Celtic had managed that feat. Celtic also qualified for the Champions League group stage, winning all of their home games but losing all of their away games.

He then guided Celtic to the 2003 UEFA Cup final in Seville, which Celtic lost 3–2 in extra time to a Porto side managed by José Mourinho. This was Celtic's first European final since 1970 and they beat Blackburn, Celta Vigo, Stuttgart, Liverpool and Boavista on the way to the final. The following season Celtic regained the league title from rivals Rangers and reached the quarter-finals of the UEFA Cup, with their run seeing them knock out Barcelona.

On 25 May 2005, Celtic announced that O'Neill would resign as manager to care for his wife, Geraldine, who had lymphoma. His last competitive game in charge of Celtic was the Scottish Cup final 1–0 victory over Dundee United on 28 May 2005, decided by an eleventh-minute goal by Alan Thompson.

Under O'Neill, Celtic won 213, drew 29 and lost 40 of 282 games played, making him the most successful Celtic manager since Jock Stein. In his five seasons at Celtic Park, O'Neill won three Scottish Premier League titles, three Scottish Cups, and a League Cup. The two league titles he lost were by margins of a goal and a point, respectively. He also oversaw a record seven consecutive victories in Old Firm derbies, and in the 2003–04 season Celtic created a British record of 25 consecutive league victories. His win rate of 75.5% is the highest of any manager in the club's history.

Gordon Strachan was announced as O'Neill's replacement in June 2005 and after winning the SPL title in his first year in charge, he became only the third Celtic manager to win three titles in a row. He also guided Celtic to their first UEFA Champions League knockout stage in 2006–07 and repeated the feat in 2007–08 before departing the club in May 2009, after failing to win the SPL title. Tony Mowbray took charge of the club in June 2009, and he was succeeded a year later by Neil Lennon. In November 2010, Celtic set an SPL record for the biggest win in SPL history, defeating Aberdeen 9–0 at Celtic Park.

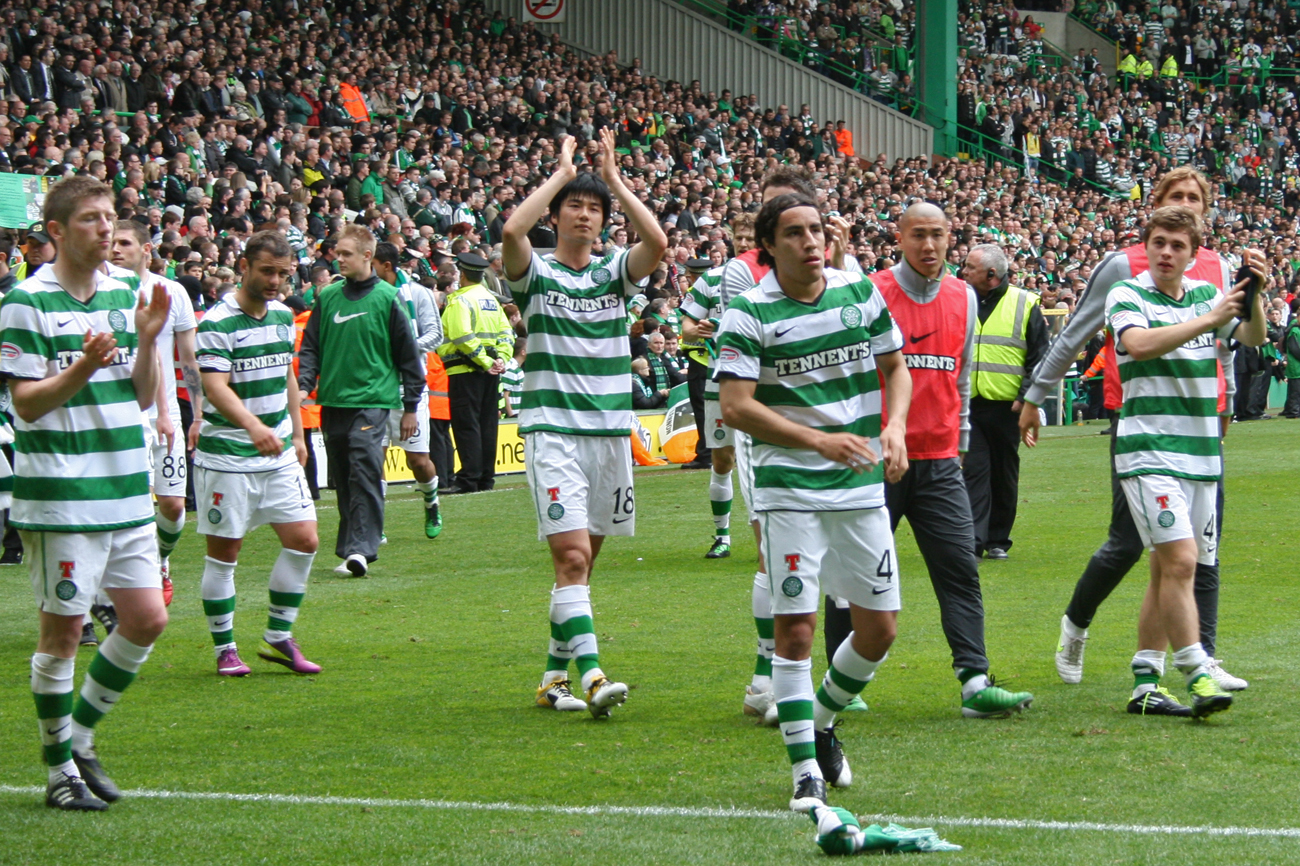
Celtic players on the final day of the 2010-11 season

=== 2010s and win against Barcelona ===
Celtic celebrated their 125th anniversary in November 2012, the same week as a Champions League match against Barcelona. They won 2–1 on the night to complete a memorable week, and eventually qualified from the group stages for the round of 16. Celtic finished the season with the SPL and Scottish Cup double. The club clinched their third consecutive league title in March 2014, with goalkeeper Fraser Forster setting a new record during the campaign of 1,256 minutes without conceding a goal in a league match. At the end of the season, manager Neil Lennon announced his departure from the club after four years in the role.

Norwegian Ronny Deila was appointed manager of Celtic on 6 June 2014. He went on to lead the team to two consecutive league titles and a League Cup, but the team's performances in European competition were poor. After being eliminated from the Scottish Cup by Rangers in April 2016, Deila announced he would leave the club at the end of the season.

On 20 May 2016, Brendan Rodgers was announced as Deila's successor. His first season saw the team go on a long unbeaten run in domestic competitions, during which time the club won their 100th major trophy, defeating Aberdeen 3–0 in the League Cup final in November 2016. Celtic also clinched their sixth successive league title in April 2017 with a record eight league games to spare, and eventually finished with a record 106 points, becoming the first Scottish side to complete a top-flight league season undefeated since Rangers in 1899. Celtic clinched their fourth treble by defeating Aberdeen 2–1 in the 2017 Scottish Cup final, the result of which saw the club go through the entire domestic season unbeaten.

Celtic continued their unbeaten domestic run into the following season, eventually extending it to 69 games, surpassing their own 100-year-old British record of 62 games, before finally losing to Hearts in November 2017. Celtic retained the League Cup that same month by defeating Motherwell in the final, and went on to clinch their seventh consecutive league title in April 2018. They went on to defeat Motherwell again in the 2018 Scottish Cup final to clinch a second consecutive domestic treble (the "double treble"), the first club in Scotland to do so. Rodgers left the club midway through following season to join Leicester City; Neil Lennon returned as caretaker manager for the rest of the season and helped Celtic secure an unprecedented third consecutive domestic treble (the "treble treble"), defeating Hearts 2–1 in the 2019 Scottish Cup final. Later that month, he was confirmed as the club's new manager. The following season, Celtic completed the "quadruple treble". In December 2019, Lennon led Celtic to a 1–0 win over Rangers in the 2019 Scottish League Cup final, the club's tenth consecutive domestic trophy.

=== 2020s and domestic success ===
By March 2020, Celtic were 13 points ahead in the league when professional football in Scotland was suspended due to the COVID-19 pandemic in the United Kingdom. they were confirmed as champions in May 2020 following a SPFL board meeting where it was agreed that completing the full league campaign was infeasible. The completion of the 2019–20 Scottish Cup was delayed, with the semi-finals and final – between Celtic and Hearts as in the previous year – not taking place until late autumn/winter of 2020. Celtic won on penalty-kicks after the sides tied at 3–3 after extra time, clinching a fourth successive treble. However, Celtic struggled throughout the 2020–21 season with poor performances in Europe, knocked out of the League Cup by Ross County, and by February 2021 were trailing 18 points behind Rangers in the league – effectively ending their hopes of winning "ten in a row" league titles. Lennon resigned on 24 February 2021, with assistant manager John Kennedy taking interim charge of the team. In the closing weeks of the season, Celtic were knocked out of the Scottish Cup by Rangers which condemned them to their first trophy-less season since 2010, and finished the league campaign 25 points behind their Glasgow rivals.

Celtic players huddling during a match against Hibernian in the Scottish League Cup in 2024.

On 26 April 2025, Celtic defeated Dundee United 5–0 to secure their fourth consecutive league title, which represented their 13th title won across their previous 14 league campaigns and 55th league title overall.

On 13 May, 2026, Celtic faced Motherwell at Fir Park. Celtic won the match on a penalty scored by Kelechi Iheanacho in the 100th minute, making the final score 3-2 in favor of Celtic. Had Celtic lost this game, Hearts would have been crowned champions. On 16 May, 2026, Celtic faced Hearts at Celtic Park for a title decider. Hearts had spent 250 days at the top of the Scottish Premiership table before the match against Celtic. Celtic won by a score of 3-1 after two goals in the final minutes of the game from Daizen Maeda and Callum Osmand, being crowned the champions of the Scottish Premiership for the 2025-26 season, and their fifth consecutive league title. Excluding post-season playoffs in 1891 and 1905, it was only the third time the Scottish championship had been decided between the two contenders directly on the final matchday, after 1965 (also involving Hearts) and 1991.

== Crest and colours ==
For most of Celtic's history their home strip has featured green and white horizontal hoops, but their original strip consisted of a white top with black shorts and black and green hooped socks. The top also featured the Marist Brothers' badge on the right hand side, consisting of a green Celtic cross inside a red circle. In 1889, the club changed to a green and white vertically striped top and for the next fourteen years this remained unchanged although the colour of the shorts alternated between white and black several times over this period. The top did not feature a crest.

In 1903, Celtic adopted their now famous green and white hooped tops. The new design was worn for the first time on 15 August 1903 in a match against Partick Thistle. Black socks continued to be worn until the early 1930s, at which point the team switched to green socks. Plain white socks came into use in the mid-1960s, and white has been the predominant colour worn since then.

The club began using a badge in the 1930s, featuring a four leaf clover logo surrounded by the club's formal title, "The Celtic Football and Athletic Coy. Ltd". However, it was not until 1977 that Celtic finally adopted the club crest on their shirts. The outer segment was reversed out, with white lettering on a green background on the team shirts. The text around the clover logo on the shirts was also shortened from the official club crest to "The Celtic Football Club". For their centenary year in 1988, a commemorative crest was worn, featuring the Celtic cross that appeared on their first shirts. The 1977 version was reinstated for season 1989–90.

From 1945 onwards numbered shirts slowly came into use throughout Scotland, before becoming compulsory in 1960. By this time Celtic were the last club in Britain to adopt the use of numbers on the team strip to identify players. The traditionalist and idealistic Celtic chairman, Robert Kelly, baulked at the prospect of the famous green and white hoops being disfigured, and as such Celtic wore their numbers on the players' shorts. This unusual tradition survived until 1994, although numbered shirts were worn in European competition from 1975 onwards. Celtic's tradition of wearing numbers on their shorts rather than on the back of their shirts was brought to an end when the Scottish Football League instructed Celtic to wear numbers on their shirts from the start of the 1994–95 season. Celtic responded by adding numbers to the top of their sleeves, however within a few weeks the football authorities ordered the club to attach them to the back of their shirts, where they appeared on a large white patch, breaking up the green and white hoops.

In 1984 Celtic took up shirt sponsorship for the first time, with Fife-based double glazing firm CR Smith having their logo emblazoned on the front of the team jersey. In season 1991–92, Celtic switched to Glasgow-based car sales company Peoples as sponsors. The club failed to secure a shirt sponsor for season 1992–93, and for the first time since the early 1980s Celtic took to the field in "unblemished" hoops. Despite the loss of marketing revenue, sales of the new unsponsored replica top increased dramatically. Celtic regained shirt sponsorship for season 1993–94, with CR Smith returning as shirt sponsors in a four-year deal.

In 2005 the club severed their connection with Umbro, suppliers of their kits since the 1930s and entered into a contract with Nike. To mark the 40th anniversary of their European Cup win, a special crest was introduced for the 2007–08 season. The star that represents this triumph was retained when the usual crest was reinstated the following season. In 2012, a retro style kit was designed by Nike that included narrower hoops to mark the club's 125th anniversary. A special crest was introduced with a Celtic knot design embroidered round the traditional badge. A third-choice strip based on the first strip from 1888 was also adopted for the season.

In March 2015, Celtic agreed a new kit deal worth £30 million with Boston-based sportswear manufacturer New Balance to replace Nike from the start of the 2015–16 season.

All of the kits for the 2017–18 season paid tribute to the Lisbon Lions, with the kits having a line on each side to represent the handles of the European Cup. The kits also included a commemorative crest, designed specifically for the season. The regular crest was reinstated the following season, although the away strip featured a Celtic cross once again in reference to the club's heritage.

In March 2020, Celtic announced a new five-year partnership with Adidas starting on 1 July 2020, in a deal believed to be the biggest kit sponsorship ever in Scottish sport.

1888-1889 (Note: Digital recreation; used on the first strips Celtic ever wore)

1896-1897 (Note: Digital recreation, used in that years season ticket)

1928-1929 (Note: Digital recreation, used in that years season ticket)

1925-1965 (Note: Used in 3 stints. 1925-26, 1931, and 1948-1965)

1987-1989 (Note: Centenary logo)

1995-present (Note: Sometimes used monochromatically or with a star (to represent the 1967 European cup win)

History of Celtic football strips
1888	1889–1903	1903–1932	1932–1965	1965 onwards

Period	Kit manufacturer	Shirt sponsor (front)	Shirt sponsor (back)
1936–1984	Umbro	none	none
1984–1991	Umbro	CR Smith	none
1991–1992	Umbro	Peoples Ford	none
1992–1993	Umbro	none	none
1993–1997	Umbro	CR Smith	none
1997–1999	Umbro	Umbro	none
1999–2003	Umbro	NTL	none
2003–2005	Umbro	Carling	none
2005–2010	Nike	Carling	none
2010–2013	Nike	Tennents	none
2013–2015	Nike	Magners	none
2015–2016	New Balance	Magners	none
2016–2020	New Balance	Dafabet	Magners
2020–2025	Adidas	Dafabet	Magners
2025–	Adidas	Dafabet	none

== Stadium ==
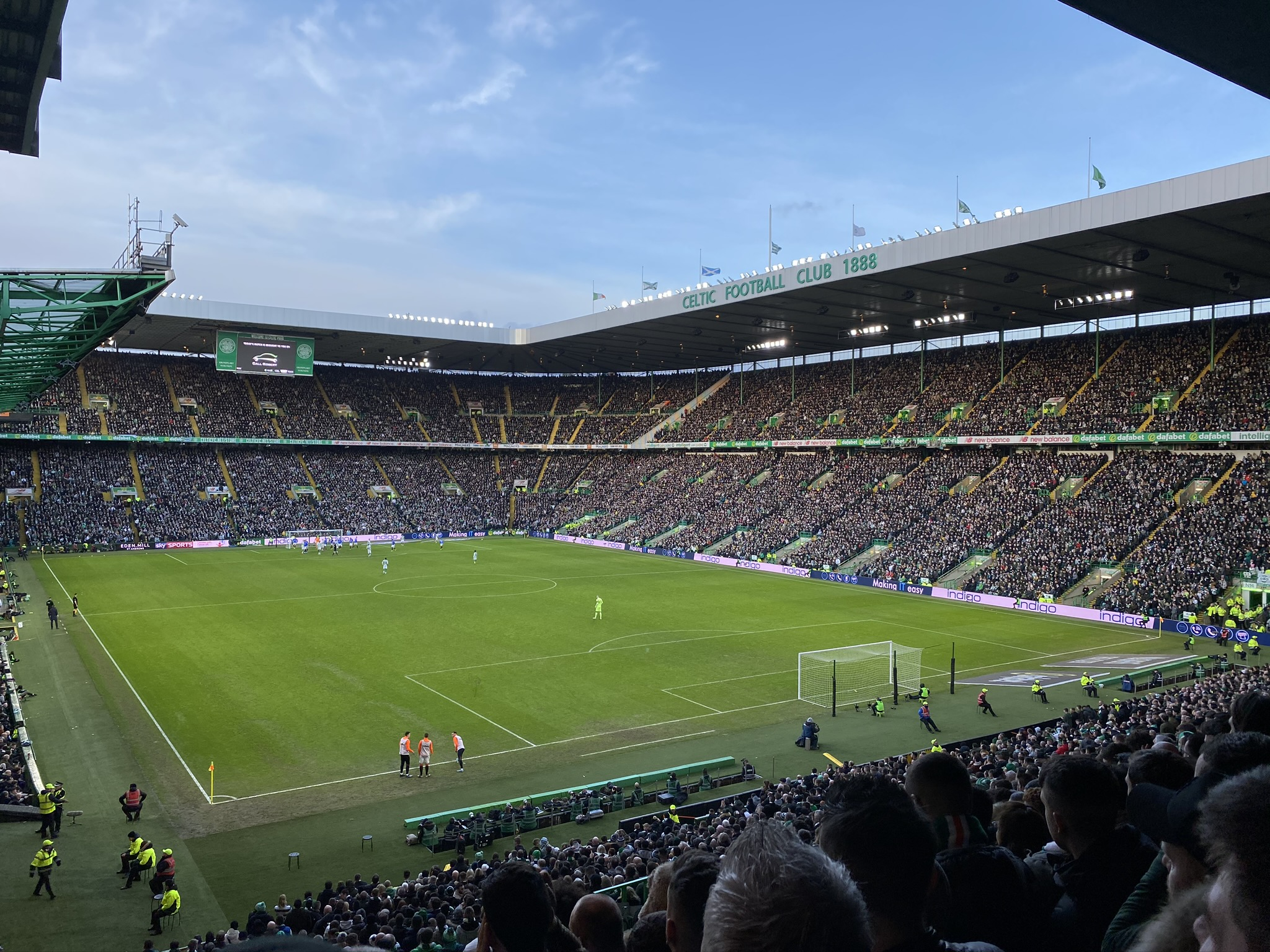
Celtic Park during a Glasgow derby in 2019

Celtic's stadium is Celtic Park, which is in the Parkhead area of Glasgow. Celtic Park, an all-seater stadium with a capacity of 60,411, is the largest football stadium in Scotland and the eighth-largest stadium in the United Kingdom, after Murrayfield, Old Trafford, Twickenham, Wembley, the London Stadium, Tottenham Hotspur Stadium and the Millennium Stadium. It is commonly known as Parkhead or Paradise.

Celtic opened the original Celtic Park in the Parkhead area in 1888. The club moved to a different site in 1892, however, when the rental charge was greatly increased. The new site was developed into an oval shaped stadium, with vast terracing sections. The record attendance of 83,500 was set by an Old Firm derby on 1 January 1938. The terraces were covered and floodlights were installed between 1957 and 1971. The Taylor Report mandated that all major clubs should have an all-seated stadium by August 1994. Celtic was in an unhealthy financial position in the early 1990s and no major work was carried out until Fergus McCann took control of the club in March 1994. He carried out a plan to demolish the old terraces and develop a new stadium in a phased rebuild, which was completed in August 1998. During this development, Celtic spent the 1994–95 season playing at the national stadium Hampden Park, costing the club £500,000 in rent. The total cost of the new stadium on its completion was £40 million.

Celtic Park in 2024

Celtic Park has been used as a venue for Scotland internationals and Cup finals, particularly when Hampden Park has been unavailable. Before the First World War, Celtic Park hosted various other sporting events, including Composite rules shinty–hurling, track and field and the 1897 Track Cycling World Championships. Open-air masses, and First World War recruitment drives have also been held there. In more recent years, Celtic Park has hosted the Opening Ceremonies of the 2014 Commonwealth Games, the 2005 Special Olympics National Games and the 1990 Special Olympics European Games. Celtic Park has occasionally been used for concerts, including performances by The Who and U2.

In July 2016, Celtic Park became the first British football stadium to have a "rail seating" (safe standing) area in the ground. Rail seating is particularly common in Germany's Bundesliga, most notably at Borussia Dortmund's Westfalenstadion, a ground with a reputation on par with Celtic Park for its intensity and atmosphere.

In June 2018, Celtic announced a series of stadium improvements that would be implemented before the 2018–19 season. These include the installation of new LED floodlights and a new entertainment system, a stadium-wide PA system and a new hybrid playing surface.

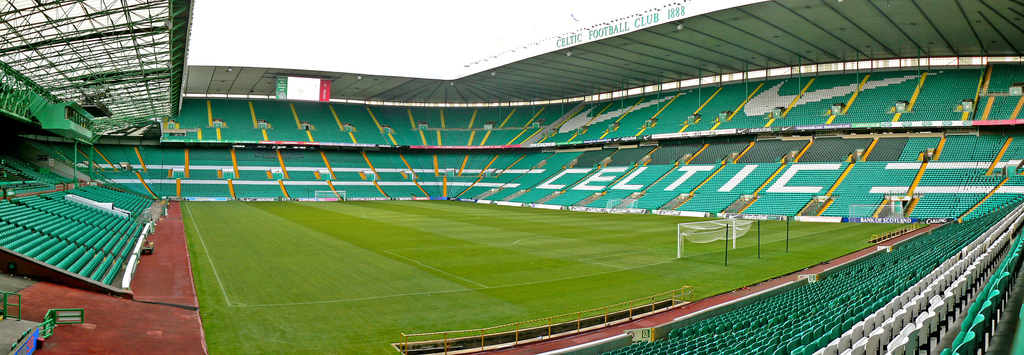
A panoramic view of Celtic Park

== Supporters ==
=== Support ===
Celtic fans in Newcastle upon Tyne in 2007.

In 2003 Celtic were estimated to have a fan base of nine million people, including one million in the US and Canada. There are over 160 Celtic Supporters Clubs in over 20 countries around the world.

An estimated 80,000 Celtic supporters, many without match tickets, travelled to Seville in Spain for the UEFA Cup final in May 2003. The club's fans subsequently received awards from UEFA and FIFA for their behaviour at the match.

Celtic has the highest average home attendance of any Scottish club. They also had the 12th highest average league attendance out of all the football clubs in Europe in 2011. A study of stadium attendance figures from 2013 to 2018 by the CIES Football Observatory ranked Celtic at 16th in the world during that period, and their proportion of the distribution of spectators in Scotland at 36.5%, the highest of any club in the leagues examined.

In October 2013, French football magazine So Foot published a list of whom they considered the "best" football supporters in the world. Celtic fans were placed third, the only club in Britain on the list, with the magazine highlighting their rendition of "You'll Never Walk Alone" before the start of European ties at Celtic Park.

On 23 October 2017, Celtic fans were awarded with the FIFA Fan Award for their tifo commemorating the 50th anniversary of the club's European cup win. The award celebrates the best fan moment of November 2016 to August 2017.

==== Traditions ====
Celtic supporters have many traditions that are practiced at Celtic Park. Fans notably carry green and white bar scarves at matches. They are raised when You'll Never Walk Alone is played at Celtic Park.

Before kick off, Celtic players will gather around in a huddle on the pitch. This has been a common occurrence since 1995, when it was introduced by then-captain Tony Mowbray. Supporters also link arms and turn together in the stands to replicate the Celtic Huddle. This tradition was introduced by the Green Brigade in the 2010s.

The Celtic Song is played as the players walk on to the pitch, with fans singing along.

=== Ultras ===
Celtic has two main ultra groups, the Green Brigade, founded in 2006, and Bhoys Celtic, founded in 2015 The two groups previously had unfriendly relations towards each other. As of the 2026-27 season, the Green Brigade and Bhoys share the North Curve Stand at Celtic Park.

==== Green Brigade ====
In 2006, members of a prior Celtic Ultra group split and founded the Green Brigade, occupying the back rows of the North Curve stand of Celtic Park's Section 111. The Green Brigade have had a left leaning, pro-Irish and pro-Palestinian stance, which is evident in the many protests and stunts they do. In 2010, the club officially allocated 300 tickets to the Green Brigade in the front rows of the North Curve, where they still sit today.

The Green Brigade ultras during a match against FC Salzburg in Salzburg.

In 2013, the Green Brigade were banned from Celtic Park after disorder at Fir Park during a Celtic match against Motherwell. The club allowed the Green Brigade to return for the 2014-15 season.

The Green Brigade have gained notoriety for their pro-Palestine displays and chants, including one in 2016 against Israeli side Hapoel Be'er Sheva F.C. which cost the club £8,619. They later began a movement called Match the Fine for Palestine, raising £172,000 for Palestinian charities. The group have unfurled banners at other matches calling for Israel to be banned from UEFA competition, and support of the Palestinian resistance. They have also displayed sectarian and Irish republican banners, and sung chants of the nature.

==== Bhoys Celtic ====
Bhoys Celtic were founded in March of 2015 after splitting from the 'Style Mile Vandals', a graffiti group associated with the Green Brigade in Section 111. SMV split from the Green Brigade, regrouping in Section 444 and 445 in the back rows of the corner between the North Stand and the Jock Stein Stand.

Banners of Bhoys, one of the two ultra groups of Celtic.

Initially, Bhoys shared an unfriendly relationship with the Green Brigade. However, the two groups repaired relations over time, with Bhoys boycotting a match against Aberdeen after the club banned the Green Brigade from the match.

In 2022, Bhoys were moved to Section 122, in the corner between the Main Stand and the Jock Stein Stand. This set up had Bhoys directly diagonal from the Green Brigade.

Starting in the 2026-27 season, Bhoys and the Green Brigade share the North Curve stand at Celtic Park, previously occupied by just the Green Brigade.

=== Sectarianism ===
Celtic's traditional rivals are Rangers; collectively, the two clubs are known as the Old Firm and seen by some as the world's biggest football derby. The two have dominated Scottish football's history; between them, they have won the Scottish league championship 110 times since its inception in 1890 – all other clubs combined have won 19 championships. The two clubs are also by far the most supported in Scotland, with Celtic having the sixth highest home attendance in the UK during the 2014–15 season. Celtic have a historic association with the people of Ireland and Scots of Irish descent, both of whom are mainly Roman Catholic. Traditionally fans of rivals Rangers came from Scottish or Northern Irish Protestant backgrounds and support Unionism in Ireland.

The clubs have attracted the support of opposing factions in the Troubles in Northern Ireland. Some supporters use songs, chants and banners at matches to abuse or show support for the Protestant or Catholic religions and proclaim support for Northern Irish paramilitary groups such as the IRA and UVF.

There have been over 400 Old Firm matches played. The games have been described as having an "atmosphere of hatred, religious tension and intimidation which continues to lead to violence in communities across Scotland." The rivalry has fuelled many assaults and even deaths on Old Firm Derby days. Admissions to hospital emergency rooms have been reported to increase ninefold over normal levels and in the period from 1996 to 2003, eight deaths in Glasgow were directly linked to Old Firm matches, and hundreds of assaults.

Both sets of fans fought on the pitch after Celtic's victory in the 1980 Scottish Cup final at Hampden Park. There was serious fan disorder during an Old Firm match played in May 1999 at Celtic Park; missiles were thrown by Celtic fans, including one which struck referee Hugh Dallas, who needed medical treatment, and a small number of fans invaded the pitch.

Celtic have taken measures to reduce sectarianism. In 1996, the club launched its Bhoys Against Bigotry campaign, later followed by Youth Against Bigotry to "educate the young on having ... respect for all aspects of the community – all races, all colours, all creeds".

=== Irish republicanism ===
Green Brigade banners showing an IRA soldier, and another showing a banner of Brendan Rodgers styled after IRA signs in Crossmaglen that read ''Sniper at work'.

Some groups of Celtic fans have expressed their support for Irish republicanism and the Irish Republican Army by singing or chanting about them at matches.

In 2008 and 2010, there were protests by groups of fans over the team wearing the poppy for Remembrance Day, as the symbol is opposed by Irish Republicans owing to its association with the British military. Celtic expressed disapproval of these protests, saying they were damaging to the image of the club and its fans, and pledged to ban those involved. In 2011, UEFA and the Scottish Premier League investigated the club over pro-IRA chants by fans at different games. UEFA fined Celtic £12,700, while the SPL took no action, as the club had taken all reasonable action to prevent the chants. In December 2013 UEFA issued the club with a €50,000 (£42,000) fine as a result of a banner unveiled by the Green Brigade at a UEFA Champions League match against AC Milan which displayed a political message (UEFA rules prohibit the display of banners of a political or ideological nature). The banner attracted further controversy for the use of the image of IRA hunger striker Bobby Sands.

During the 2017–18 season, the second qualifying round draw set up an all-United Kingdom clash with Belfast club Linfield. In the leg held at Windsor Park, some Linfield supporters threw bottles and coins at Celtic players and sang sectarian songs. During the return fixture, "illicit banner" displays were produced and UEFA charged Celtic again. The banner "showed a paramilitary-type figure" next to an image of Brendan Rodgers, the Northern Irish manager of Celtic, under the words "Brendan's undefeated army"; the Daily Record accused the Green Brigade of designing the flags, and also claimed that the "undertones of the imagery were also clearly referring to the politics of Ireland while a section of Celtic fans were also heard singing pro-IRA songs during the powderkeg tie with the Belfast side. Linfield are seen as a Protestant Unionist club in Northern Ireland and fans of both sides had earlier hurled abuse at each other as they made their way into the stadium". Celtic elected to close off the zone that holds the Green Brigade for the following two matches.

== Celtic media ==
The Celtic View

=== Print ===
In 1965, Celtic began publishing its own newspaper, The Celtic View, now the oldest club magazine in football. It was the brainchild of future chairman Jack McGinn, who at the time was working in the circulation department of Beaverbrook Newspapers. McGinn himself edited the paper for the first few years, with circulation initially reaching around 26,000 copies. By 2020, it was a 72-page glossy magazine with over 6,000 weekly readers, and the top selling club magazine in the United Kingdom. In the spring of 2020, the magazine saw a temporary cease of production due to the outbreak of the COVID-19 pandemic in the UK. However, in August 2021, Celtic announced the restart of the production activities for the magazine, which was turned into a 100-page, quarterly publication.

=== Digital media ===
From 2002, Celtic's Internet TV channel Channel67 (previously known as Celtic Replay) broadcast Celtic's own content worldwide and offered live match coverage to subscribers outside the UK. It also provided three online channels. In 2004, Celtic launched their own digital TV channel called Celtic TV, which was available in the UK through Setanta Sports on satellite and cable platforms. Due to the collapse of Setanta in the UK in June 2009, Celtic TV stopped broadcasting, although the club hoped to find a new broadcast partner. In 2011, Celtic TV was relaunched as an online service and replaced Channel 67.

== Influence on other clubs ==
Due to Celtic's large following, several clubs have emulated or been inspired by Celtic. As the club has a large following, especially in Northern Ireland, several clubs have been founded there by local Celtic fans. The most notable and successful was Belfast Celtic, formed in 1891 simply as Celtic. Upon incorporation as a limited company in 1901, however, the club adopted the name "Belfast Celtic", the title "Celtic Football Club Ltd" already being registered by the Glasgow club. Their home from the same year was Celtic Park on Donegall Road in west Belfast, known to the fans as Paradise. It was one of the most successful teams in Ireland until it withdrew from the Irish League in 1949. Donegal Celtic, currently playing in the NIFL Premier Intermediate League, was established in 1970, with the Celtic part being taken on due to the massive local following for Scotland's Celtic and formerly Belfast Celtic. They are nicknamed The Wee Hoops and play at Donegal Celtic Park on Suffolk Road in Belfast. A club by the name of Lurgan Celtic was originally formed in 1903, with the obvious slant of aiming towards the Roman Catholic community of the town, adopting the name and colours of the Glaswegian Celtic. The County Armagh club currently plays in the NIFL Championship. In the Republic of Ireland, both Tuam Celtic A.F.C. and Castlebar Celtic F.C. play at grounds called Celtic Park.

Throughout Scotland and England, other clubs have been named after and adopted Celtic's kit. These include the now defunct Scottish club Blantyre Celtic F.C.; Irish club Listowel Celtic F.C.; and English lower-league clubs Cleator Moor Celtic F.C., which was founded in 1908–09 by Irish immigrants employed in the local iron ore mines, Celtic Nation F.C. (now defunct) and West Allotment Celtic F.C. Somerset club Yeovil Town F.C., who traditionally wore an all-green shirt, modified their uniform to emulate Celtic's, inspired by the Scottish club's 2003 UEFA Cup run.

South African club Bloemfontein Celtic F.C., based in Bloemfontein , previously one of the most popular clubs in the country with a large fan base in the Free State, is also named after Celtic F.C. Founded in 1969 as Mangaung United, in 1984, the then owner Molemela took over the club and changed the name to Bloemfontein Celtic. In the United States of America, Hurricanes F.C. of Houston, Texas rebranded as Celtic FC America in 2019 and played in the Texas Premier Soccer League. Russian amateur club Celtic Shatura play in the town of Shatura in the Moscow region.

Amateur Australian club South Lismore Celtic FC, which plays in the FFNC Premier League, the top league of the Football Far North Coast region, are named and designed after Celtic. South Lismore Celtic FC were the 2022 champions of the FFNC Premier League.

In late 1911, Real Betis had adopted the kit of Celtic, which at that time featured vertical stripes of green and white, that were brought over by Manuel Asensio Ramos. On 28 February 2017, on the 37th Andalusia Day, Real Betis wore Celtic-inspired horizontal hoops against Málaga CF.

== Charity ==
Celtic was initially founded to raise money for the poor in the East End of Glasgow and the club still retain strong charitable traditions today. In 1995 the Celtic Charity Fund was formed with the aim of "revitalising Celtic's charitable traditions" and by September 2013 had raised over £5 million. The Charity Fund has since then merged with the Celtic Foundation, forming the Celtic FC Foundation, and continues to raise money for local, national and international causes.

On 9 August 2011 Celtic held a testimonial match in honour of former player John Kennedy. Due to the humanitarian crisis in East Africa, the entire proceeds were donated to Oxfam. An estimated £300,000 was raised.

Celtic hold an annual charity fashion show at Celtic Park. In 2011 the main beneficiaries were Breast Cancer Care Scotland.

Yorkhill Hospital is another charity with whom Celtic are affiliated and in December 2011 the club donated £3000 to it. Chief Executive Peter Lawwell said that; "Celtic has always been much more than a football club and it is important that, at all times we play an important role in the wider community. The club is delighted to have enjoyed such a long and positive connection with Yorkhill Hospital."

== Ownership and finances ==
=== Private company ===
Celtic were formed in 1887, and in 1897 the club became a Private Limited Company with a nominal share capital of 5000 shares at £1 each. The following year a further share issue of 5000 £1 shares was created to raise more capital. The largest number of shares held were by businessmen from the East End of Glasgow, notably James Grant, an Irish publican and engineer, James Kelly, one of the club's original players turned publican, and John Glass, a builder and driving force in the early years of the club. His shares, upon his death in 1906, passed on to Thomas White. The Grant, Kelly and White families' shareholdings dominated ownership of the club throughout the 20th century.

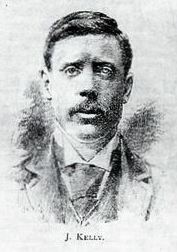
James Kelly was one of Celtic's early directors and also briefly chairman. His son Robert Kelly spent many years as chairman, and further descendants Kevin Kelly and Michael Kelly went on to have prominent roles on the Celtic board.

The late 1940s saw Robert Kelly, son of James Kelly, become chairman of the club after having been a director since 1931. Desmond White also joined the board around this time, upon the death of his father Thomas White. By the 1950s, a significant number of shares in the club had passed to Neil and Felicia Grant, who lived in Toome, County Antrim. These shares accounted for more than a sixth of the club's total issue. Club chairman Robert Kelly's own family share-holding was of a similar size, and he used his close relationship with the Toomebridge Grants to ensure his power base at Celtic was unchallengeable. When Neil Grant died in the early 1960s, his shareholding passed to his sister Felicia, leaving her as the largest share-holder in Celtic. This gave rise to the myth among Celtic supporters of the "old lady in Ireland" who supposedly had the ultimate say in the running of the club.

Celtic's board of directors had a reputation of being miserly and authoritarian. In particular they were known for frequently selling their top players and not paying their staff enough; they were also seen as lacking ambition, which caused friction with several managers. Jimmy McGrory's tenure as manager is generally considered a period of underachievement, but with Chairman Robert Kelly's domineering influence. many have questioned how much authority McGrory ever had in team selection. Even Jock Stein's time as manager ended on a sour note when he was offered a place on the Celtic board, but in a role involving ticket sales. Stein felt that this was demeaning, stating he was "a football man, not a ticket salesman". He declined this offer and decided to stay in football management, joining Leeds United instead. Billy McNeill won a trophy in each of his five seasons as manager, but was still paid less than the managers of Rangers, Aberdeen and Dundee United. He left the club in June 1983 after his request for a contract and pay rise was publicly rebuffed by the board. McNeill moved on to manage Manchester City, stating that to remain at Celtic would have been humiliating. McNeill's successor, David Hay, also had his difficulties with the Celtic board. When trying to sign players in 1987 to strengthen his squad to compete with high-spending Rangers, the board refused to pay for them; chairman Jack McGinn was quoted as saying that if Hay wanted these players, "he will have to pay for them himself".

By the end of the 1980s the Celtic board consisted of chairman McGinn and directors Kevin Kelly, Chris White, Tom Grant and Jimmy Farrell. Neither McGinn nor Farrell were members of the traditional family dynasties at Celtic. Farrell was a partner in the Shaughnessy law firm that had long-standing connections with Celtic, and was invited to become a director in 1964. McGinn had set up The Celtic View in the 1960s and later became the club's commercial manager. He was given a seat on the board and became chairman in 1986. In May 1990 the former Lord Provost of Glasgow, Michael Kelly, and property developer Brian Dempsey were invited to join the Celtic board. Dempsey did not last long however, as a dispute about a proposed relocation to Robroyston resulted in him being voted off the board five months later.

=== McCann takeover and transition to plc ===
Throughout the 1960s and 70s Celtic had been one of the strongest clubs in Europe. However, the directors failed to accompany the wave of economic development facing football in the 1980s, although the club continued to remain successful on the field, albeit limited to the domestic scene in Scotland. In 1989, the club's annual budget was £6.4 million, about a third as much as Barcelona, with a debt of around 40% and on-field success deteriorating. In the early 1990s the situation began to worsen as playing success declined dramatically and the club slipped further into debt.

In 1993 fans began organising pressure groups to protest against the board, one of the most prominent being "Celts for Change". They supported a takeover bid led by Canadian-based businessman Fergus McCann and former director Brian Dempsey. Football writer Jim Traynor described McCann's attempt to buy the club as "good against evil". Despite declining attendances and increasing unrest amongst supporters, the Kelly, White and Grant family groupings continued to guard their control of Celtic.

On 4 March 1994, McCann bought Celtic for £9 million, finally wresting control from the family dynasties that had run the club for almost 100 years. When he bought the club it was reported to be within 24 hours of entering receivership due to exceeding a £5 million overdraft with the Bank of Scotland. He turned Celtic into a public limited company through a share issue which raised over £14 million, the most successful share issue in British football history. He also oversaw the building of a new stadium, the 60,000 seater Celtic Park, which cost £40 million and at the time was Britain's largest club stadium. This allowed Celtic to progress as a club because over £20 million was being raised each year from season ticket sales.

McCann had maintained that he would only be at Celtic for five years and in September 1999 he announced that his 50.3% stake in Celtic was for sale. McCann had wanted the ownership of Celtic to be spread as widely as possible and gave first preference to existing shareholders and season-ticket holders, to prevent a new consortium taking over the club. 14.4 million shares were sold by McCann at a value of 280 pence each. McCann made £40 million out of this, meaning he left Celtic with a £31 million profit. During his tenure, turnover at Celtic rose by 385% to £33.8m and operating profits rose from £282,000 to £6.7m. McCann was often criticised during his time at Celtic and many people disagreed with him over building a stadium which they thought Celtic could not fill, not investing enough in the squad and being overly focused on finance. However, McCann was responsible for the financial recovery of the club and for providing a very good platform for it to build on. After he left Celtic, the club were able to invest in players and achieved much success such as winning the treble in 2000–01 and reaching the 2003 UEFA Cup final.

After McCann's exit, Irish billionaire Dermot Desmond was left as the majority shareholder. He purchased 2.8 million of McCann's shares to increase his stake in the club from 13% to 20%.

In 2005, Celtic issued a share offer designed to raise £15 million for the club; 50 million new shares were made available priced at 30p each. It was also revealed that majority shareholder Desmond would buy around £10 million worth of the shares. £10 million of the money raised was for building a new training centre and youth academy, expanding the club's global scouting network and investing in coaching and player development programmes. The rest of the money was to be used to reduce debt. Building a youth academy was important for Celtic to surpass both Hearts and Rangers who had superior youth facilities at the time. The share issue was a success and Celtic had more applicants than shares available, The new Lennoxtown training centre was opened in October 2007.

Celtic have been ranked in the Deloitte Football Money League six times. This lists the top 20 football clubs in the world according to revenue. They were ranked between 2002 (2000–01 season), 2006 (2004–05 season) and 2008 (2006–07 season).

Celtic's financial results for 2011 showed that the club's debt had been reduced from £5.5 million to £500,000 and that a pre-tax profit of £100,000 had been achieved, compared with a loss of over £2 million the previous year. Turnover also decreased by 15% from £63 million to £52 million.

In May 2012, Celtic were rated 37th in Brand Finance's annual valuation of the world's biggest football clubs. Celtic's brand was valued at $64 million (£40.7 million), $15 million more than the previous year. It was the first time a Scottish club had been ranked in the top 50. Matt Hannagan, Sports Brand Valuation Analyst at Brand Finance, said that Celtic were constrained by the amount of money they got from the SPL and that if they were in the Premiership then, due to their large fan base, they could be in the top 10 clubs in the world.

== Players ==
=== First-team squad ===
As of 2 September 2026

Note: Flags indicate national team as defined under FIFA eligibility rules; some limited exceptions apply. Players may hold more than one non-FIFA nationality.

No.	Pos.	Nation	Player
1	GK	FIN	Viljami Sinisalo
2	DF	CAN	Alistair Johnston
3	DF	SUI	Jordan Lotomba
5	DF	IRL	Liam Scales
6	DF	USA	Auston Trusty
7	FW	POR	Jota
8	MF	SWE	Benjamin Nygren
9	FW	DEN	Kasper Høgh
11	FW	COL	Camilo Durán
12	MF	ENG	Landon Emenalo (on loan from Chelsea)
13	FW	KOR	Yang Hyun-jun
14	MF	SCO	Luke McCowan
17	FW	TUN	Sebastian Tounekti
18	MF	DEN	Oliver Sørensen (on loan from Parma)
19	FW	ENG	Callum Osmand

No.	Pos.	Nation	Player
20	DF	USA	Cameron Carter-Vickers
21	MF	ENG	Alex Oxlade-Chamberlain
22	MF	GER	Mika Baur
23	FW	EGY	Haissem Hassan
26	GK	ENG	Sam Johnstone (on loan from Wolves)
29	FW	ENG	Shim Mheuka (on loan from Chelsea)
31	GK	SCO	Ross Doohan
35	MF	NED	Joël van den Berg
42	MF	SCO	Callum McGregor (captain)
47	DF	SCO	Dane Murray
49	FW	SCO	James Forrest
51	DF	SCO	Colby Donovan
56	DF	SCO	Anthony Ralston
63	DF	SCO	Kieran Tierney

=== Out on loan ===
Note: Flags indicate national team as defined under FIFA eligibility rules; some limited exceptions apply. Players may hold more than one non-FIFA nationality.

No.	Pos.	Nation	Player
10	FW	COD	Michel-Ange Balikwisha (at Gent until 30 June 2027)
15	MF	NOR	Odin Thiago Holm (at Vålerenga until 31 December 2026)
28	MF	POR	Paulo Bernardo (at Górnik Zabrze until 30 June 2027)

No.	Pos.	Nation	Player
37	DF	SCO	Adam Montgomery (at Livingston until 30 June 2027)
—	FW	JPN	Shin Yamada (at OH Leuven until 30 June 2027)

=== Academy squads ===
For more details on the academy squads, see Celtic F.C. B Team and Academy.

=== Women's team ===
Celtic have a pathway for female players, from eleven years old upwards. In 2007 the club launched their women's first team, sometimes known as Celtic Women. The women's team reached the Scottish Women's Cup final in their first season, and won their first trophy in 2010, the Scottish Women's Premier League Cup. In December 2018 they announced a move to full-time training, becoming the first professional women's football team in Scotland.

=== Former players ===
For further information, see List of Celtic F.C. players for players with over 100 appearances or other stated notability, List of Celtic F.C. international footballers and Category:Celtic FC players for a general list of ex-players.

=== Club captains ===
For further information, see Celtic club captains

List of Celtic F.C. captains
Name	Period
(Scotland) James Kelly	1888–1897
(Scotland) Dan Doyle	1897–1899
(Scotland) Sandy McMahon	1899–1903
(Scotland) Willie Orr	1903–1906
(Scotland) Jimmy Hay	1906–1911
(Scotland) Jim Young	1911–1917
(Scotland) Alec McNair	1917–1920
(Scotland) William Cringan	1920–1923
(Scotland) Charlie Shaw	1923–1925
(Scotland) Willie McStay	1925–1929
(Scotland) Jimmy McStay	1929–1934
(Scotland) Bobby Hogg	1934–1935
(Scotland) Willie Lyon	1935–1939
(Scotland) John McPhail	1948–1953
(Republic of Ireland) Sean Fallon	1952–1953
(Scotland) Jock Stein	1953–1955

Name	Period
(Scotland) Bobby Evans	1955–1957
(Northern Ireland) Bertie Peacock	1957–1961
(Scotland) Duncan MacKay	1961–1963
(Scotland) Billy McNeill	1963–1975
(Scotland) Kenny Dalglish	1975–1977
(Scotland) Danny McGrain	1977–1987
(Scotland) Roy Aitken	1987–1990
(Scotland) Paul McStay	1990–1997
(Scotland) Tom Boyd	1997–2002
(Scotland) Paul Lambert	2002–2004
(Scotland) Jackie McNamara	2004–2005
(Northern Ireland) Neil Lennon	2005–2007
(Scotland) Stephen McManus	2007–2010
(Scotland) Scott Brown	2010–2021
(Scotland) Callum McGregor	2021–present

=== Greatest ever team ===

Greatest-ever Celtic team

In 2002 the greatest-ever Celtic team was voted by supporters:

- (Scotland) Ronnie Simpson
- (Scotland) Danny McGrain
- (Scotland) Tommy Gemmell
- (Scotland) Bobby Murdoch
- (Scotland) Paul McStay
- (Scotland) Billy McNeill – Voted Celtic's greatest ever captain
- (Scotland) Bertie Auld
- (Scotland) Jimmy Johnstone – Voted Celtic's greatest ever player
- (Scotland) Bobby Lennox
- (Scotland) Kenny Dalglish
- (Sweden) Henrik Larsson – Voted Celtic's greatest ever foreign player

== Club officials ==
=== Board of directors ===
Position	Name
Chairman	Brian Wilson (interim)
Chief executive	Michael Nicholson
Chief financial officer	Chris McKay
Independent non-executive director	Sharon Brown
Independent non-executive director	Raymond Buchanan
Independent non-executive director	Dermot Desmond
Independent non-executive director	Mark Keane
Independent non-executive director	Brian Rose
Company secretary	Joanne McNairn

=== Management ===
Position	Name
Manager	Martin O'Neill
Assistant managers	Shaun Maloney; Mark Fotheringham
First team coach	Stephen McManus
Set piece coach	Ross Grant
Goalkeeping coach	Stevie Woods
Performance analyst	Greg Wallace
Head of fitness	Andy Boles
Head of sports science	William Currie
Physio	Tim Williamson

=== Managerial history ===
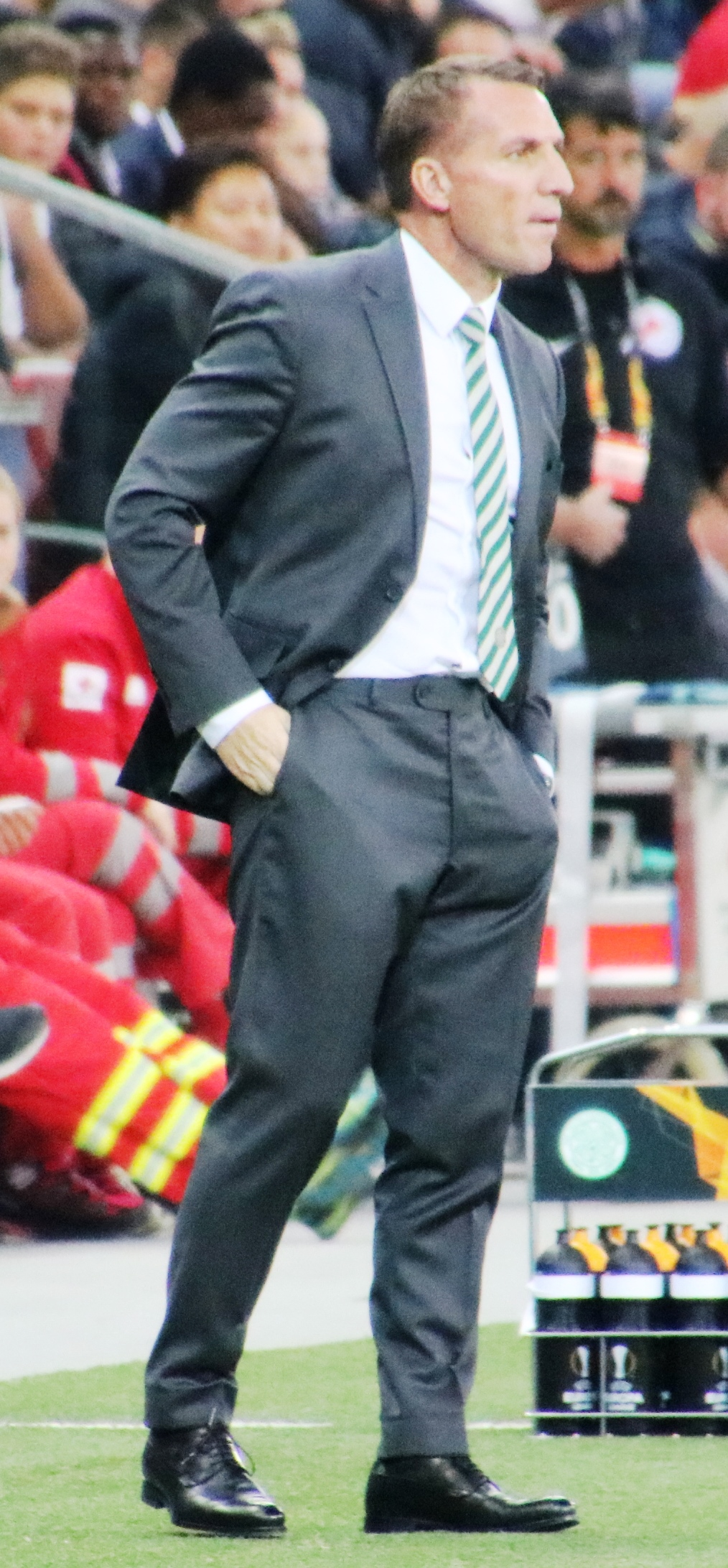
Brendan Rodgers led Celtic to a unique unbeaten domestic treble in the 2016–17 season.

Name	Period
(Scotland) Willie Maley	1897–1940
(Scotland) Jimmy McStay	1940–1945
(Scotland) Jimmy McGrory	1945–1965
(Scotland) Jock Stein	1965–1978
(Scotland) Billy McNeill	1978–1983
(Scotland) Billy McNeill	1987–1991
(Scotland) David Hay	1983–1987
(Republic of Ireland) Liam Brady	1991–1993
(Scotland) Lou Macari	1993–1994
(Scotland) Tommy Burns	1994–1997
(Netherlands) Wim Jansen	1997–1998
(Slovakia) Jozef Vengloš	1998–1999

Name	Period
(England) John Barnes	1999–2000
(Northern Ireland) Martin O'Neill	2000–2005
(Northern Ireland) Martin O'Neill	2026–present
(Scotland) Gordon Strachan	2005–2009
(England) Tony Mowbray	2009–2010
(Northern Ireland) Neil Lennon	2010–2014
(Northern Ireland) Neil Lennon	2019–2021
(Norway) Ronny Deila	2014–2016
(Northern Ireland) Brendan Rodgers	2016–2019
(Northern Ireland) Brendan Rodgers	2023–2025
(Australia) Ange Postecoglou	2021–2023
(France) Wilfried Nancy	2025–2026

== Halls of Fame ==
=== Scotland Football Hall of Fame ===
As of 1 June 2020, 27 Celtic players and managers have entered the Scottish Football Hall of Fame:

- (Scotland) Roy Aitken
- (Scotland) Bertie Auld
- (Scotland) Stevie Chalmers
- (Scotland) John Clark
- (Scotland) Jim Craig
- (Scotland) Paddy Crerand
- (Scotland) Kenny Dalglish
- (Scotland) Jimmy Delaney
- (Scotland) Bobby Evans
- (Scotland) Tommy Gemmell
- (Scotland) Mo Johnston
- (Scotland) Jimmy Johnstone
- (Scotland) Paul Lambert
- (Sweden) Henrik Larsson
- (Scotland) Bobby Lennox
- (Scotland) Willie Maley
- (Scotland) Danny McGrain
- (Scotland) Jimmy McGrory
- (Scotland) Billy McNeill
- (Scotland) Paul McStay
- (Scotland) Bobby Murdoch
- (Scotland) Charlie Nicholas
- (Scotland) Ronnie Simpson
- (Scotland) Jock Stein
- (Scotland) Gordon Strachan
- (Scotland) John Thomson
- (Scotland) Willie Wallace

=== Scotland Roll of Honour ===
The Scotland national football team roll of honour recognises players who have gained 50 or more international caps for Scotland. Inductees to have played for Celtic are:

- Roy Aitken (50)
- Tom Boyd (66)
- Scott Brown (52)
- Gary Caldwell (17)
- John Collins (32)
- Kenny Dalglish (47)
- Craig Gordon (14)
- Danny McGrain (62)
- Paul McStay (76)
- Kenny Miller (7)

Numbers in brackets indicate the number of caps the above players won whilst at Celtic.

=== Scottish Sports Hall of Fame ===
In the Scottish Sports Hall of Fame, five Celtic players have been selected, they are:

- Kenny Dalglish
- Jimmy Johnstone
- Jimmy McGrory
- Billy McNeill
- Jock Stein

== Honours ==
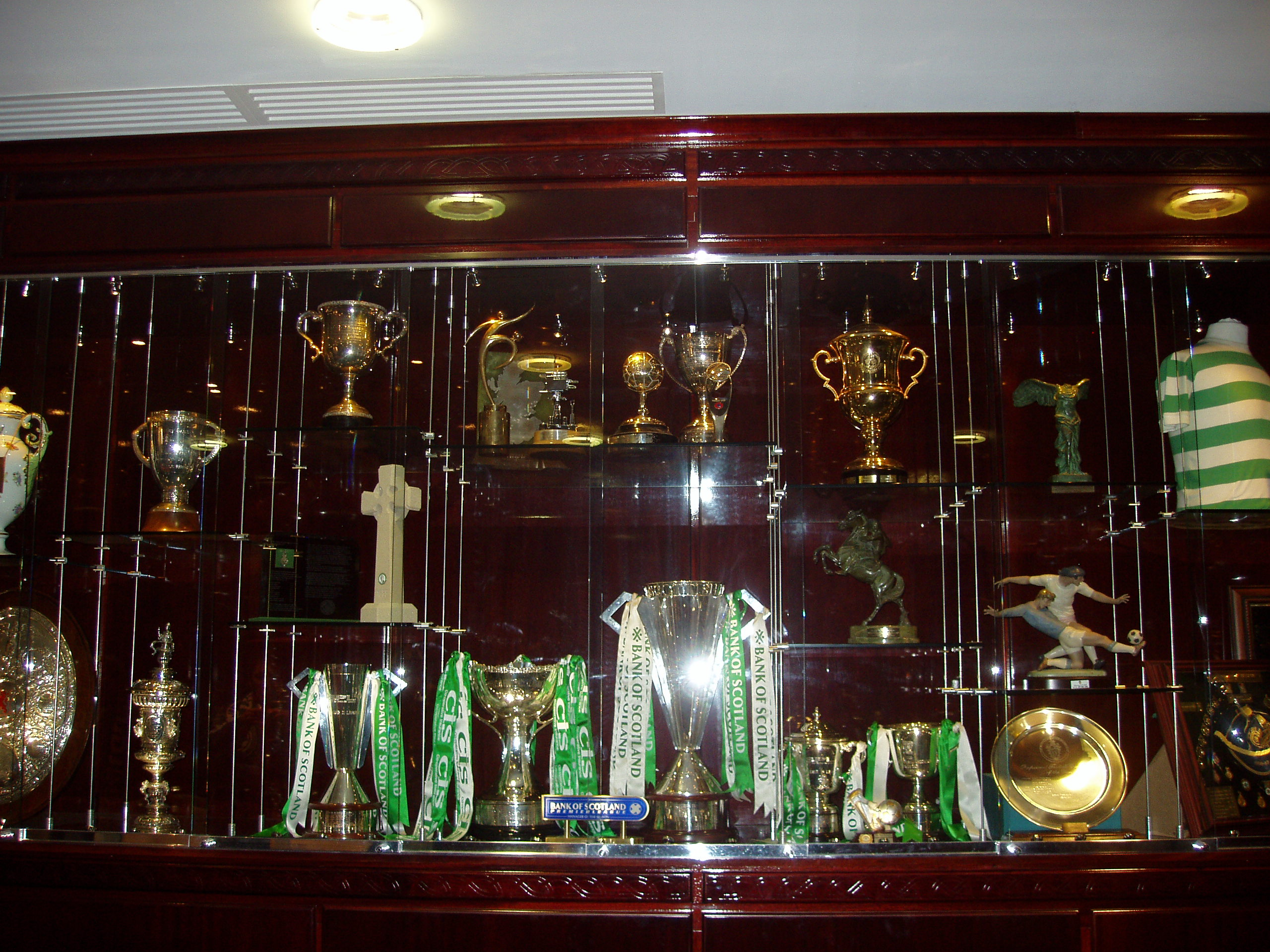
Trophy case at Celtic Park

Type	Competition	Titles	Seasons
Domestic	Scottish League Championship	56	1892–93, 1893–94, 1895–96, 1897–98, 1904–05, 1905–06, 1906–07, 1907–08, 1908–09, 1909–10, 1913–14, 1914–15, 1915–16, 1916–17, 1918–19, 1921–22, 1925–26, 1935–36, 1937–38, 1953–54, 1965–66, 1966–67, 1967–68, 1968–69, 1969–70, 1970–71, 1971–72, 1972–73, 1973–74, 1976–77, 1978–79, 1980–81, 1981–82, 1985–86, 1987–88, 1997–98, 2000–01, 2001–02, 2003–04, 2005–06, 2006–07, 2007–08, 2011–12, 2012–13, 2013–14, 2014–15, 2015–16, 2016–17, 2017–18, 2018–19, 2019–20, 2021–22, 2022–23, 2023–24, 2024–25, 2025–26
Domestic	Scottish Cup	43	1891–92, 1898–99, 1899–1900, 1903–04, 1906–07, 1907–08, 1910–11, 1911–12, 1913–14, 1922–23, 1924–25, 1926–27, 1930–31, 1932–33, 1936–37, 1950–51, 1953–54, 1964–65, 1966–67, 1968–69, 1970–71, 1971–72, 1973–74, 1974–75, 1976–77, 1979–80, 1984–85, 1987–88, 1988–89, 1994–95, 2000–01, 2003–04, 2004–05, 2006–07, 2010–11, 2012–13, 2016–17, 2017–18, 2018–19, 2019–20, 2022–23, 2023–24, 2025–26
Domestic	Scottish League Cup	22	1956–57, 1957–58, 1965–66, 1966–67, 1967–68, 1968–69, 1969–70, 1974–75, 1982–83, 1997–98, 1999–2000, 2000–01, 2005–06, 2008–09, 2014–15, 2016–17, 2017–18, 2018–19, 2019–20, 2021–22, 2022–23, 2024–25
Continental	UEFA Champions League	1	1966–67

- record

=== Other honours ===
- European Cup/UEFA Champions League
  - Runners-up: 1969–70
- UEFA Cup/UEFA Europa League
  - Runners-up: 2002–03
- Intercontinental Cup
  - Runners-up: 1967
- British League Cup
  - Winners: 1902
- Empire Exhibition Trophy
  - Winners: 1938
- Coronation Cup
  - Winners: 1953

=== Other awards ===
- BBC Sports Personality of the Year Team Award: 1

1967

- France Football European Team of the Year: 1

1970

- FIFA Fair Play Award: 1

2003^{1}

- UEFA Fair Play Award: 1

2003^{1}

- FIFA Fan Award: 1

2017^{1}

^{1} Awarded to the fans of Celtic.

=== Quadruple ===
- League Title, Scottish Cup, League Cup, and European Cup: 1

1966–67

=== Trebles ===
- League Title, Scottish Cup, and League Cup: 8

1966–67, 1968–69, 2000–01, 2016–17, 2017–18, 2018–19, 2019–20, 2022–23

=== Doubles ===
- League Title and Scottish Cup: 14

1906–07, 1907–08, 1913–14, 1953–54, 1970–71, 1971–72, 1973–74, 1976–77, 1987–88, 2003–04, 2006–07, 2012–13, 2023–24, 2025–26

- League Title and League Cup: 8

1965–66, 1967–68, 1969–70, 1997–98, 2005–06, 2014–15, 2021–22, 2024–25

- Scottish Cup and Scottish League Cup: 1

1974–75

== Records ==
=== Club records ===
- The Scottish Cup final win against Aberdeen in 1937 was attended by a crowd of 147,365 at Hampden Park in Glasgow, which remains a world record gate for a national cup final, and also the highest attendance for a club football match in Europe.
- Highest attendance for a European club competition match: 136,505 against Leeds United in the European Cup semi-final at Hampden Park (15 April 1970).
- Record home attendance: 83,500 against Rangers on 1 January 1938. (Note: Newspaper reports at the time indicate that the officially returned attendance was given as 83,500, with an estimated further 10,000 supporters locked out of the ground for safety reasons. However, the ground's capacity was gauged at the time as being around 88,000 and several subsequent sources (including the club's official website) have since revised the attendance up to 92,000.) A 3–0 victory for Celtic.
- UK record for an unbeaten run in domestic professional football: 69 games (60 won, 9 drawn), from 15 May 2016 until 17 December 2017 – a total of 582 days in all.
- SPL record for an unbeaten run of home matches: 77 games, from 2001 to 2004.
- 14 consecutive League Cup final appearances, from season 1964–65 to 1977–78 inclusive, a world record for successive appearances in the final of a major football competition.
- World record for total number of goals scored in a season (competitive games only): 196 (season 1966–67).
- Most goals scored in one Scottish top-flight league match by one player: eight goals by Jimmy McGrory against Dunfermline in 9–0 win on 14 January 1928.
- Highest-scoring British domestic cup final: Celtic 7–1 Rangers (1957 Scottish League Cup final).
- Fastest hat-trick in European club competition: Mark Burchill against Jeunesse Esch in 2000; 3 minutes (between twelfth minute and fifteenth minute), a record at the time.
- Earliest Scottish Premiership title won: Won with eight games remaining in 2017, against Heart of Midlothian on 2 April 2017.
- Biggest margin of victory in the SPL: 9–0 against Aberdeen, 6 November 2010.
- Biggest margin of victory in the Scottish Premiership: 9–0 against Dundee United, 28 August 2022.
- Celtic and Hibernian hold the record for the largest transfer fee between two Scottish clubs (Scott Brown in May 2007).
- Most expensive export from Scottish football: Kieran Tierney to Arsenal (August 2019).
- First weekly football club publication in the UK: The Celtic View.
- First European club to field a player from the Indian sub-continent: Mohammed Salim.
- Gil Heron, who signed for Celtic in 1951, was the first black person to play professionally in Scotland; his son Gil Scott-Heron rose to prominence in the 1970s as a hugely influential jazz and soul musician.

=== Individual records ===
- Record appearances (all competitions): Billy McNeill, 822 from 1957 to 1975
- Record appearances (League): Alec McNair, 583 from 1904 to 1925
- Most capped player for Scotland: 102 (47 whilst at Celtic), Kenny Dalglish
- Most international caps for Scotland while a Celtic player: 76, Paul McStay
- Most caps won whilst at Celtic: 80, Pat Bonner
- Record scorer: Jimmy McGrory, 522 (1922/23 – 1937/38)
- Record scorer in league: Jimmy McGrory, 396
- Most goals in a season (all competitions): Jimmy McGrory, 62 (1927/28) (47 in League, 15 in Cup competitions)
- Most goals in a season (league only): Jimmy McGrory, 50 (1935/36)

== Club partners ==
As of 12 August 2025, Celtic has partnerships with:

- Adidas
- Dafabet
- Fleet Alliance
- JD Sports
- EA Sports
- Magners
- Kellogg's
- Coca-Cola
- William Hill
- Cadbury
- Forbes on the Square
- Celtic Compare
- Clyde 1
- Eleven Sports Media
- Nirvana Europe
- Cordial
- Soccer Supplement
- Match Worn Shirt
- The Turmeric Co.
- Sky Sports
- The NWH Group
- Premier Produce
