= History of Celtic F.C. =

The History of Celtic F.C. spans the period from 1887 to the present day. For detail on individual periods of the club's history, see one of the following articles:

- History of Celtic F.C. (1887–1994)
- History of Celtic F.C. (1994–present)

For a season-by-season account of Celtic's history, see List of Celtic F.C. seasons.

For a specific account of Celtic's history in international club competitions, see Celtic F.C. in international football.
