= LimoLiner =

US intercity bus service

- Founded: October 2003
- Ceased operation: December 31, 2019
- Headquarters: 154 Maple St. Stoughton, MA 02072
- Service area: Massachusetts, New York
- Service type: Intercity coach service
- Destinations: Midtown Manhattan; Back Bay, Boston; Framingham, Massachusetts
- Chief executive: Mark Richardson, President
- Website: www.limoliner.com

LimoLiner was an intercity bus service that operated from 2003 until 2019. It had offered bus service between Boston, Massachusetts and New York, New York. Operating from a curbside location in Midtown Manhattan, it served the Boston area from a park-and-ride lot in suburban Framingham and a downtown location in the Back Bay. Initial funding by founder Fergus McCann purchased 3 buses seating 28 passengers (instead of a more typical 55). Sunday service was added in February 2004.

LimoLiner buses had larger leather seats with more legroom than typical intercity buses. Most rows had a single seat on one side of the aisle and two on the other. In addition to a bathroom, the bus had an attendant and a small galley provisioned with free light snacks.

In May 2014, the company announced on its Facebook page that its founder had retired, and that the company had been sold to Hamilton Transportation Group.

LimoLiner announced via its website and Facebook page on December 31, 2019 that it had ceased operations due to financial difficulties.
