= History of Celtic F.C. (1994–present) =

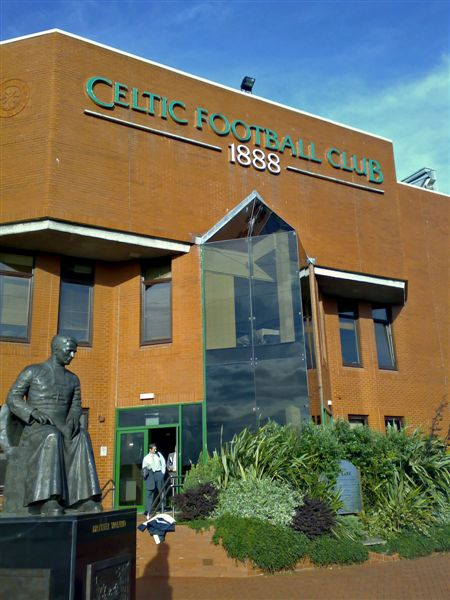

Celtic Football Club has always competed in the highest level of football in Scotland, currently the Scottish Premiership. The club was constituted in 1887, and played its first game in 1888. Celtic play their home games at Celtic Park having moved there in 1892 from their original ground nearby.

By 1994, Celtic had endured several years of decline and were encountering difficulties on and off the park. Expatriate businessman Fergus McCann wrestled control of the club from the families that had run Celtic since its founding. The club was reconstituted as a PLC and floated on the stock market, raising £14 million. The finance provided funding for the rebuilding of Celtic Park into a 60,000 all-seated stadium, the largest football stadium in Scotland.

The team improved over the years that followed and in 1998 won the league title, their first championship success in ten years. The arrival of Martin O'Neill as manager in 2000 saw the club become the dominant force in Scotland, winning three league titles in five years and reaching the UEFA Cup Final in 2003. In 2005–06, Celtic's home games attracted an average attendance of 58,149, placing Celtic at the time behind only Manchester United F.C. in terms of highest average attendance for any football club in the United Kingdom. Celtic enjoyed a period of notable dominance in the 2010s: They won nine consecutive league titles again, went undefeated in domestic competitions in season 2016–17, and won four consecutive domestic trebles.

Celtic are currently managed by Martin O’Neill on an interim basis, following the departure of Wilfried Nancy in January 2026.

== The Fergus McCann era (1994–1999) ==
The Bank of Scotland informed Celtic on 3 March 1994 that it was calling in receivers as a result of the club exceeding a £5 million overdraft. Expatriate businessman Fergus McCann, however, wrested control of the club from the family dynasties which had controlled Celtic since its founding, purchasing the club for a reported £9 million. According to media reports, McCann took over the club minutes before it was to be declared bankrupt.

At this time, the club was an estimated £7 million in debt, and attendances at Parkhead frequently dipped below 20,000. The old board had insisted on a limit of only 7,000 season tickets, on the basis that "season tickets are more trouble than they're worth". Shortly prior to the takeover, the club was only valued at around £20,000 due to the ordinary shares being artificially valued at £1 each and the regulations of the private limited company which decreed that shares could only be traded with the permission of the directors, who had first refusal on any that became available. Most significantly, the shares were not allowed to "float" to their true value, as a result of which directors were able to purchase them for around £3 each. Bulk holders such as Michael Kelly, Chris White and David Smith insisted on being paid around £300 per share, leaving McCann resentful over the disappearance of funds that could have been used in the resuscitation of the business.

In order to alleviate the club's debt, McCann reconstituted the then privately owned Celtic Football & Athletic Company Limited into a public limited company – Celtic PLC. To finance this restructuring, McCann set up a share issue which generated £14 million, one of the most successful stock market flotations in British financial history.

=== Tommy Burns spell ===
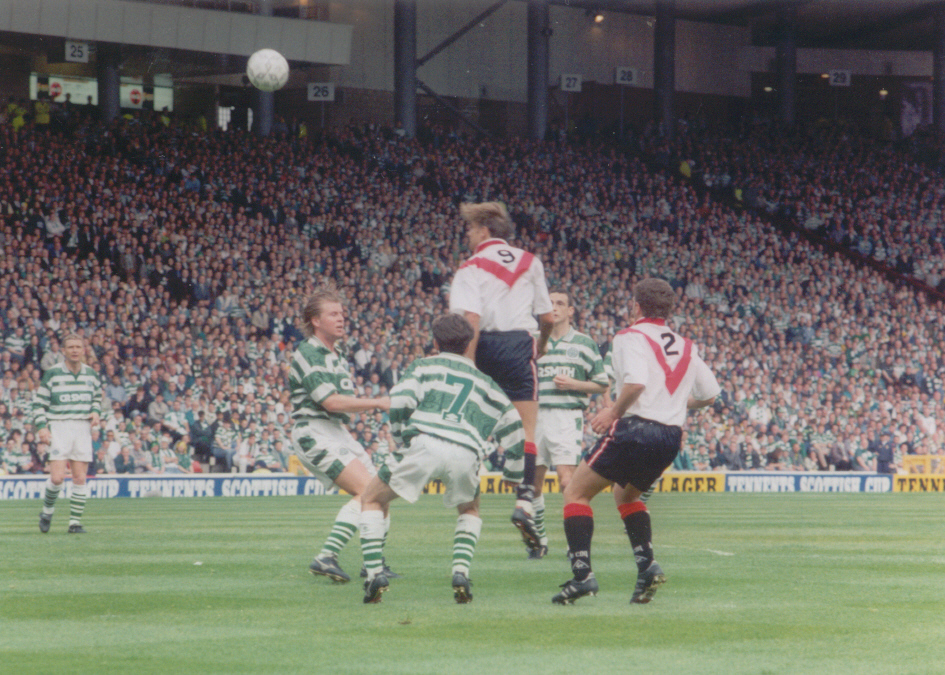
Celtic playing against Airdrie in the 1995 Scottish Cup Final; this was their first trophy since 1989

On the playing side, manager Lou Macari was sacked by McCann and replaced in the summer of 1994 by former Celtic player Tommy Burns, with Billy Stark as his assistant. Former player and manager Davie Hay also returned to the club, as chief scout. Celtic played their home games at Hampden Park in the first season under the new regime due to the redevelopment of Celtic Park. Celtic were poor in the league that season, but managed to win their first trophy in six years when they defeated Airdrie 1–0 in the Scottish Cup Final on 27 May 1995. The winning goal was scored by Dutch striker Pierre van Hooijdonk, who had been signed several months earlier from NAC Breda for £1.2 million.

The following season saw Celtic return to their home ground at Celtic Park. Former East German international striker Andreas Thom was signed over the summer for a then club record fee of £2.2 million. During the pre-season, defender Tony Mowbray persuaded his teammates to engage in a pre-match huddle prior to a friendly against German side Kickers Emden in an effort to boost the players' camaraderie and togetherness. Although Mowbray would leave the club several weeks later, the pre-match huddle remains a constant ritual that is performed by Celtic players to this day prior to every game. Tommy Burns' second season saw him successfully restore a more attacking style of play to the side. The new strike pairing of Van Hooijdonk and Thom forged an accomplished partnership up front. The midfield duo of Paul McStay and John Collins were integral to Celtic's attractive football and Jackie McNamara and Simon Donnelly won praise for their link-up play on the right. Celtic only lost one league match during the 1995–96 season, but for all the plaudits they received, they remained unable to prevent Rangers from winning an eighth-straight league title.

During this time, the club was under pressure to invest heavily in playing talent – particularly from the fans – to thwart Rangers' attempts to equal and surpass the nine-in-a-row record Celtic held. McCann was often criticised by the fans and media for his perceived frugality, but further signings were made in 1996, with Portuguese striker Jorge Cadete and Italian winger Paolo Di Canio arriving at Celtic Park.

The 1996–97 season saw Tommy Burns under intense media scrutiny and pressure from the supporters as Rangers closed in on their ninth successive league title. Despite Van Hooijdonk, Cadete and Di Canio having outstanding seasons as individual players, Celtic struggled to match the form of the previous season. John Collins had left for Monaco in the summer and Paul McStay was toiling with injury. As a result, individual performances were unable to make up for the lack of overall team coherence and Celtic finished the season trophy-less, with Rangers winning their ninth successive league title and equalling Celtic's record set under Jock Stein.

McCann found himself embroiled in contractual disputes with the trio of Van Hooijdonk, Cadete and Di Canio, labelling them the "Three Amigos". McCann refused to cave in to what he considered the excessive demands of these foreign mercurial talents and, to the frustration of fans, the three each left the club under a cloud, albeit for large transfer fees.

With just three weeks left of the 1996–97 season, Burns was sacked, with the club's remaining coaching staff also leaving at the end of the season. Various names were touted in the media as being likely to take over, however McCann made a surprising choice in Dutch coach Wim Jansen. Furthermore, it was announced that the traditional manager's position at Celtic had been abolished, with the responsibilities to be split between the new roles of a head coach (Jansen) who would deal with coaching, tactics and team selection, and a general manager to deal with contracts and general administration duties. The office of the general manager was somewhat controversially taken up by solicitor and former TV football commentator Jock Brown. Davie Hay was promoted from his scouting role to Assistant General Manager, whilst former Celtic player Murdo MacLeod was appointed as assistant coach to Jansen.

=== League title under Jansen ===
The summer of 1997 saw substantial changes to Celtic's playing personnel. Scottish internationalists Darren Jackson and Craig Burley were Jansen's first signings, closely followed by Dutch winger Regi Blinker, Danish centre-half Marc Rieper and, more significantly, Swedish attacker Henrik Larsson from Feyenoord in a £650,000 deal. Bradford City reserve goalkeeper Jonathan Gould also arrived at Celtic Park in a low-key transfer deal. Club captain Paul McStay, however, retired from playing that summer due to injury, after a playing career of 15 years and 678 appearances for the club.

Rangers started the 1997–98 season as strong favourites for the league title and had themselves invested heavily over the summer in new players. Celtic made a poor start to the season, losing their first two league matches, but soon began to find their feet. Marc Rieper and Alan Stubbs quickly formed an impressive understanding in central defence, while Craig Burley proved to be a revelation in midfield with his energetic play and important goals. Jonathan Gould became the team's first choice goalkeeper and had an excellent season. Henrik Larsson had made an uninspiring start at Celtic, gifting Hibernian's Chic Charnley the winning goal through a careless pass on his debut and then scoring an own-goal in a UEFA Cup tie (Celtic still triumphed 6–3 on the night and won on aggregate). The Swede, however, soon established himself as a pivotal player in the side, at this time playing just off the main strikers.

An injury time equaliser from Alan Stubbs in November 1997 against Rangers saw Celtic remain behind the Ibrox club in the league, but stay within reaching distance. The next Old Firm encounter at New Year saw Celtic win 2–0 with goals from Craig Burley and recent signing from Borussia Dortmund, Paul Lambert. Over the following months, Celtic and Rangers each had spells at the top of the table, and as the season reached its climax, both sides dropped unexpected points as nerves took hold. Celtic eventually clinched the league title win a 2–0 win over St Johnstone on the last day of the season, their first championship title in ten years.

Despite the triumph, the title-winning celebrations soon soured when Wim Jansen made good his long held threat to resign, after difficulties working with Jock Brown and Fergus McCann. Jansen resigned just two days after the club sealed the title, with Brown widely portrayed as the villain of the piece. Davie Hay had been controversially sacked by Brown earlier in the season and Jansen's assistant, Murdo MacLeod, was sacked a week after Jansen's resignation.

=== Vengloš spell ===
A number of high-profile names were proffered as the replacement for Jansen, but the man eventually appointed by Celtic was Slovak Jozef Vengloš. Many fans, swayed doubtless by the local media, were disappointed and angry at the decision, citing Vengloš' poor record whilst in charge of English club Aston Villa some years before. Following early exits in the UEFA Champions League, UEFA Cup and League Cup, and a poor start to their league campaign, Celtic and Vengloš were subject to intense media scrutiny. The lack of players signed during the close season was one area in which the club were strongly criticised for. Amidst the almost constant negative publicity surrounding the club, Jock Brown resigned in November 1998.

Players did, however, begin to arrive in the late autumn: Norwegian defender Vidar Riseth, Swedish defensive midfielder Johan Mjällby, Slovak play-maker Ľubomír Moravčík and Australian striker Mark Viduka all joined. Following this, Celtic's fortunes began to turn when they won 5–1 against Rangers, Larsson and Moravčík both scoring twice.

Vengloš now had Celtic playing good football and his deployment of Larsson as an out-and-out striker was proving to be a huge success, with the Swede eventually going on to score 38 goals that season. The signing of Ľubomír Moravčík had initially been ridiculed by the Scottish media, but the Slovak's skills soon won the doubters over. Celtic rallied in the league but were still unable to prevent Rangers from winning the championship. Defeat in the Scottish Cup final, also against Rangers, only confirmed the club's lack of progress on the field.

Shortly after the end of the season, Vengloš resigned on health grounds but remained as an advisor and European scout for the club for a brief period. Although his tenure as head coach was strained, Vengloš is generally fondly regarded by fans, in particular for the signing of Moravčík.

In March 1999, Scottish Football Association (SFA) Chief Executive Jim Farry was fired as a result of him deliberately delaying the registration of Jorge Cadete in 1996. The delay resulted in Cadete missing several matches for Celtic he could have played in, in particular a Scottish Cup semi-final tie against Rangers which Celtic lost 2–1. Fergus McCann had complained about the matter initially to the SFA and then to an independent commission, who subsequently found Farry guilty of gross misconduct. Farry was sacked days after the commission's findings.

On taking over Celtic in 1994, Fergus McCann stated that he would be only be at the club for five years. In September 1999, he officially announced that his majority stake in Celtic was for sale. By this time, the redevelopment of Celtic Park into a 60,000 all-seated capacity stadium was complete, at a cost of £40 million., and the club had 53,000 season ticket holders. The club was now a successful business and the team vastly improved from when he took over in 1994. McCann sold his shares for £40 million, making a profit of £31 million on his initial investment. After McCann's exit, Irish billionaire Dermot Desmond was left as the largest shareholder, with a 20% stake in the club. Allan MacDonald was appointed chief executive/managing director.

== The O'Neill Years (1999–2005) ==
=== Barnes & Dalglish ===
The 1999–2000 season is widely considered one of the biggest disasters in the club's history. Kenny Dalglish returned to the club to fill the General Manager's post (which had been vacant since the departure of Jock Brown), while the head coach position was filled by former Liverpool and England player John Barnes.

Barnes had never managed a professional club, and the fans' worst fears were realised when Celtic's title challenge drastically faltered shortly after the winter break. Following a series of poor results – including elimination from the UEFA Cup and a broken leg away against Lyon for Henrik Larsson – Rangers increased their lead at the top of the Scottish Premier League table and demands for Barnes to be sacked began.

On 8 February 2000, Celtic hosted a rearranged Scottish Cup tie at home to Inverness Caledonian Thistle. Caley Thistle were an in-form side, fourth-placed in Division 1, although only in the Scottish Football League since 1994. Nevertheless, the match was still widely expected to be an easy victory for Celtic. However, Caley Thistle won the match 3–1 in one of the biggest Scottish Cup upsets ever, which sparked a protest involving over a hundred Celtic fans outside the stadium. The memorable headline in The Sun newspaper the following day read: "Super Caley Go Ballistic, Celtic Are Atrocious". Having refused to speak to the press after the match, Barnes held a press conference the next day, and implied that a dispute between him and Mark Viduka at half-time had badly unsettled the team and been responsible for the defeat. Barnes was sacked the following morning.

Kenny Dalglish took over as head coach until the end of the season, and brought Tommy Burns back to assist him. While Dalglish generally retained the respect of the supporters, Celtic's league form deteriorated further and the club finished 21 points behind Rangers at the end of the season. A League Cup final victory over Aberdeen was the only consolation in one of the most embarrassing periods of the club's history.

=== The arrival of O'Neill ===
Following the sacking of John Barnes, Guus Hiddink emerged as Celtic chief executive Alan MacDonald's initial choice to take over as manager. However, Hiddink's apparent lack of interest in the Celtic post and the intervention of majority shareholder Dermot Desmond saw Leicester City manager Martin O'Neill come to the fore as the club's primary target.

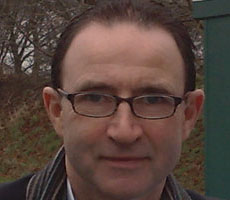
Martin O'Neill

Martin O'Neill – from Kilrea, Northern Ireland, a former European Cup winner in his playing days with Nottingham Forest – arrived at the club in the wake of the Barnes/Dalglish fiasco in June 2000. O'Neill took full charge of all team matters, effectively re-establishing the traditional role of "manager" at Celtic. With the "general manager" role now redundant, Dalglish was sacked by Celtic at the end of June.

Over the summer, O'Neill bought Chris Sutton from Chelsea for a club record £6 million, while Mark Viduka moved south to join Leeds United. Belgian international centre-half Joos Valgaeren also arrived in the summer in a bid by O'Neill to shore up a porous Celtic defence.

O'Neill's signings quickly settled in at Celtic; Sutton scored the winning goal on the first of the day of the season in a 2–1 win over Dundee United, while Valgaeren linked up well with Alan Stubbs and Tom Boyd in the centre of defence. Further players arrived over the course of 2000–01; left-sided midfielder Alan Thompson was signed from Aston Villa, the pacy Didier Agathe arrived from Hibernian, centre-half Ramon Vega headed north on loan from Tottenham Hotspur, goalkeeper Rab Douglas was signed up from Dundee and midfielder Neil Lennon was signed from O'Neill's old club Leicester City. That season saw Celtic go on to win their first domestic treble since 1969, winning the League, Scottish Cup and League Cup. O'Neill became only the second Celtic manager to achieve this, after Jock Stein. The season was also additionally memorable because of some excellent results against rivals Rangers. A famous 6–2 victory in the opening Old Firm encounter of the season at Celtic Park proved to everyone that the balance of power in Scotland had shifted. Two further league victories against Rangers: 1–0 (at Celtic Park), and 3–0 (at Ibrox) ensured O'Neill's first league title was won by a considerable distance.

O'Neill's debut season also saw outstanding performances produced by players already at Celtic. Henrik Larsson scored 53 goals in all competitions and won the European Golden Shoe with his 35 league goals. Larsson was voted both SPFA and Scottish Football Writers Player of the Year. Young Bulgarian midfielder Stiliyan Petrov impressed as well, having been signed the previous season by John Barnes. In 2001, the 21-year-old Bulgarian became the first foreign winner of the SPFA Young Player of the Year award.

=== Impact in Europe ===
Celtic prepared for the 2001–02 season by signing Guinean defender Bobo Baldé and Welsh striker John Hartson.

On 8 August 2001, Celtic played Ajax in Amsterdam in the first leg of the qualifier tie for the 2001–02 Champions League, turning in an outstanding performance. First-half goals from Dutch winger Bobby Petta and Didier Agathe gave Celtic a 2–1 lead at half-time. Chris Sutton added a third in the second half with a powerful header to give Celtic an impressive 3–1 win. A nervy second leg performance at Parkhead saw Celtic lose 0–1 on the night but progress to the group stages on aggregate, their first involvement in the Champions League group stages since the redevelopment of the tournament in the 1990s. This was the first of three occasions that O'Neill's Celtic side qualified for the group stage of the Champions League, and on the only occasion they failed, they went on to reach the final of the UEFA Cup.

Celtic made their debut in the group stages of the Champions League on 18 September 2001, losing 2–3 to Juventus in Turin. Celtic had recovered from a 2–0 deficit to level the match at 2–2, but lost a third goal near the end from a controversial penalty. Celtic recovered from that set-back to win their next two home matches against Porto and Rosenborg, but lost the away matches against the same opposition. Celtic's final group match was against Juventus at Parkhead on 31 October 2001. It was a memorable European night in Glasgow as a Chris Sutton brace and an outstanding performance from Ľubomír Moravčík helped Celtic to a famous 4–3 win. Despite finishing the group with nine points, however, Celtic failed to qualify for the next round and parachuted into the UEFA Cup. Celtic were drawn against Valencia in the UEFA Cup, and in the first leg in Spain had goalkeeper Rab Douglas to thank for keeping the score to a manageable 0–1 defeat. The second leg in Glasgow saw Henrik Larsson scoring to give Celtic a 1–0 win after 90 minutes to level the tie on aggregate. As no goals were scored during extra-time, the tie went to penalty-kicks. Celtic lost the penalty shoot-out and were knocked out.

Celtic cruised to their second successive league title in 2001–02, their first back-to-back titles in 20 years and finished 18 points clear of second-placed Rangers. Rangers, under new manager Alex McLeish, did however enjoy a modicum of revenge in the cup tournaments, beating Celtic 2–1 in the semi-final of the League Cup and twice coming from behind in the Scottish Cup Final in May 2002 to win 3–2 through a last-minute goal.

O'Neill's third season at Celtic, 2002–03, was probably the most memorable, even although the club did not win any silverware. The domestic cup tournaments again eluded Celtic; in the space of a week in March 2003, Celtic lost 2–1 to Rangers in the League Cup final and then were knocked out of the Scottish Cup a week later at the fourth round stage by Inverness Caledonian Thistle. The league campaign was a tight contest, and going into the last fixture both Celtic and Rangers were level on points. Both sides recorded high-scoring wins in their respective fixtures – Celtic won 4–0 at Kilmarnock, but Rangers' 6–1 win at Ibrox over Dumfermline Athletic saw them win the league on goal difference. It was in Europe, however, that Celtic made their mark.

Celtic's European campaign in 2002–03 began somewhat inauspiciously when they were beaten by Basel on away goals in a qualifier tie for the Champions League. Celtic dropped into the UEFA Cup, and in the first round eased to a 10–1 aggregate win over Lithuanian minnows FK Sūduva. The next round, Celtic were paired with Blackburn Rovers, managed by former Rangers player-manager Graeme Souness Celtic were poor in the first leg at Parkhead, but a Henrik Larsson goal five minutes from full-time secured a crucial 1–0 win on the night and a narrow lead to take down to Ewood Park. In the build-up to the return match, Blackburn captain Gary Flitcroft made public that Souness had commented in the dressing room after the first game that Blackburn were the better side and should have won: "That was men against boys." In the second leg, Celtic showed much more composure and scored after 14 minutes through Larsson. Celtic controlled the game after that and Chris Sutton scored another goal for Celtic in the second half, with Celtic winning 2–0 on the night and 3–0 on aggregate. Celtic's third round UEFA cup opponents were Celta de Vigo. In a first-leg overshadowed by eccentric refereeing, Larsson scored the only goal of the game in Glasgow. The return match in Spain was won 2–1 by Celta, levelling the aggregate score at 2–2, but John Hartson's away goal won the tie for Celtic. This was the first time ever that Celtic had knocked out a Spanish club in European competition, and also the first time in 23 years that Celtic had remained in European competition beyond Christmas.

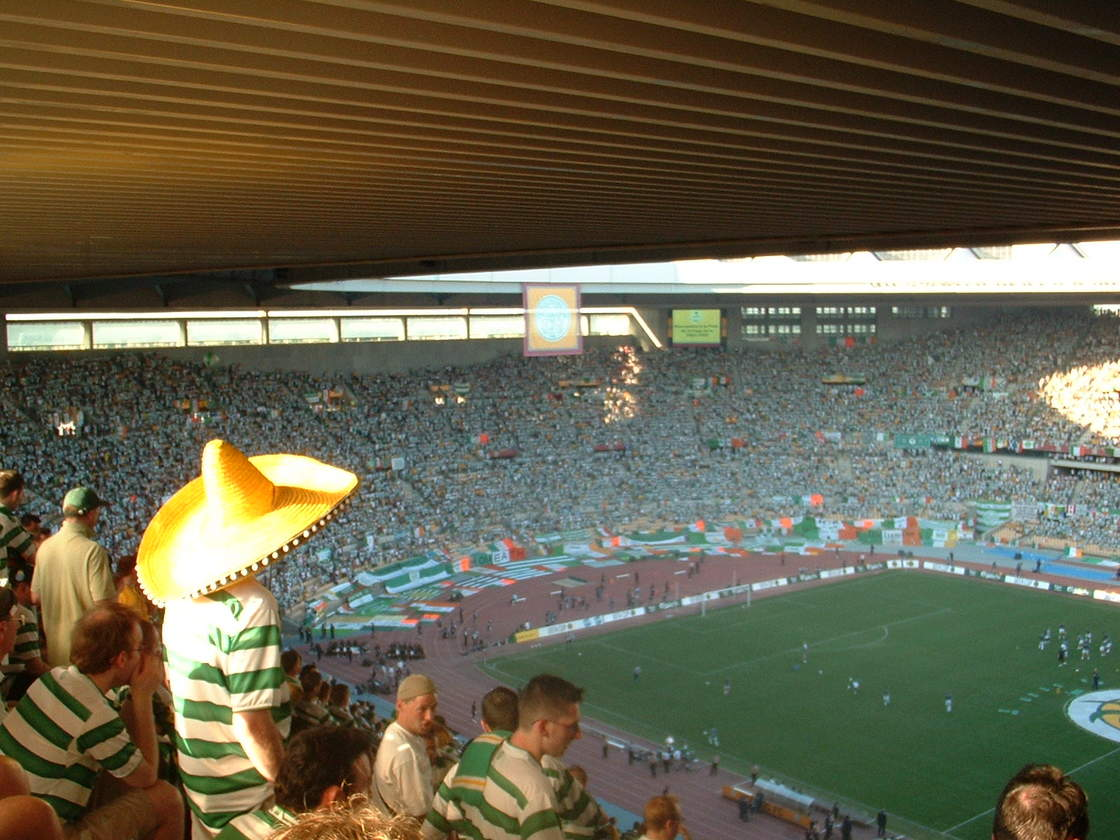
Celtic fans at the UEFA Cup Final in Seville

German Bundesliga team VfB Stuttgart were Celtic's fourth round opponents in the Spring of 2003. Celtic came from behind to win the first leg 3–1 at Parkhead. In the second leg, Celtic went 2–0 up early on, but a comeback by Stuttgart saw the Bundesliga side win 3–2 on the night; Celtic however won 5–4 on aggregate. The quarter-finals saw another English Premier League opponent for Celtic: Liverpool. The first leg took place at Celtic Park on 13 March 2003. The first leg ended 1–1 with Larsson scoring for Celtic in the first minute but the away goal gave Liverpool the advantage going in to their home tie at Anfield. During the first leg, Liverpool player El Hadji Diouf spat at a Celtic supporter, and was later fined £5,000 at Glasgow's Sheriff Court for the incident. The return match at Anfield took place the following week. Celtic won 2–0, with the goals coming from an Alan Thompson free-kick and a long-range strike from John Hartson.

Celtic's first European semi-final since the early 1970s saw them paired against Portuguese side Boavista. Celtic drew 1–1 in the first game at Parkhead, but a Henrik Larsson goal in the 80th minute of the return match in Portugal won the tie and ensured Celtic's progress to the UEFA Cup final.

In May 2003, around 80,000 Celtic fans travelled to watch the club compete in the final, held in Seville. Celtic lost the final on 21 May 2003 3–2 to Porto after extra time, despite two goals from Henrik Larsson during normal play. Celtic's cause was not helped by the late sending-off of defender Bobo Baldé and the referee's over-indulgence of Porto's time-wasting and their players' persistent feigning of injury. However, the exemplary conduct of the thousands of travelling Celtic supporters received widespread praise from the people of Seville and the fans were awarded prestigious Fair Play Awards from both FIFA and UEFA "for their extraordinarily loyal and sporting behaviour".

=== Continued success ===
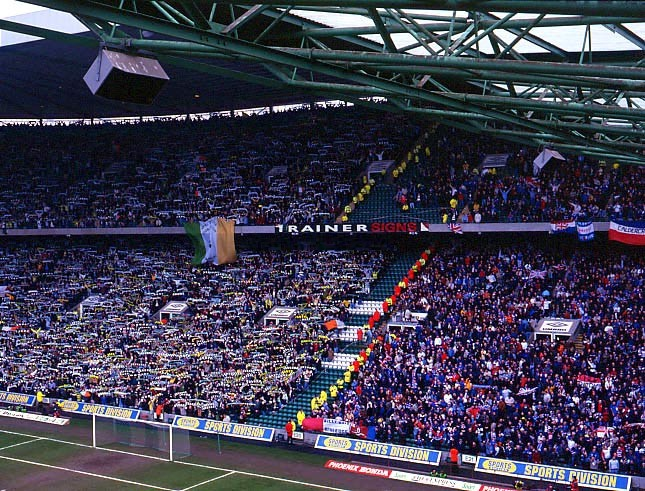
Celtic and Rangers fans at Parkhead in 2004

Celtic regained the SPL title in 2003–04 in emphatic manner, winning by a margin of 18 points and scoring over 100 goals. The league campaign also saw Celtic win 25 games in a row, setting a new British record. Celtic recorded five wins (four in the league, one in the Scottish Cup) over rivals Rangers; a last minute Chris Sutton goal in May 2004 giving Celtic a 1–0 win in the final Old Firm fixture of the season and their first whitewash of wins over their rivals for over 30 years.

Celtic qualified for the Champions League in 2003–04, but again could only finish third in the group stages and dropped into the UEFA Cup. After a straightforward aggregate win over FK Teplice, Celtic were drawn against Barcelona in the round of 16. A dramatic first leg in Glasgow saw Celtic win 1–0 through an Alan Thompson goal, but goalkeeper Rab Douglas and Barcelona's Thiago Motta were sent off during half-time for fighting in the tunnel. The return match in Spain saw Celtic fielding 19-year-old reserve goalkeeper David Marshall in place of Douglas and young defender John Kennedy standing in for Bobo Baldé, who was also suspended. Celtic found themselves under a sustained barrage of pressure, but the two youngsters turned in outstanding performances. Marshall pulled off outstanding saves from Luis Enrique and Luis García, while Kennedy made a number of great tackles to keep Barcelona at bay. Celtic held out for a scoreless draw on the night to win on aggregate and progress to the quarter-finals. Celtic's run in Europe was finally ended in the next round by another Spanish side, Villarreal, losing 3–1 on aggregate.

The Scottish Cup final was reached with ease; Celtic conceding only one goal as they knocked out Ross County, Hearts, Rangers and Livingston en route. The final against Dunfermline took place on 22 May 2004 and was the last match Henrik Larsson played for the club. The Swede ended his Celtic career on a high note, scoring twice as Celtic came from behind to win 3–1, completing a league and cup double for the season.

The following season (2004–05), O'Neill's last at the club, saw Celtic struggle to maintain their dominance of recent years. Nevertheless, they took an early lead in the league campaign and won their first encounter against Rangers in August 2004, their seventh consecutive win in Old Firm games. The league contest went to the final day of the season with Celtic needing to win away at Motherwell to guarantee the title. Celtic led for most of the match, and with two minutes of normal time remaining looked set for another SPL title. However, two late Scott McDonald goals for Motherwell saw Celtic beaten 2–1 and hand the title to rivals Rangers. The season did end in silverware for Celtic as they retained the Scottish Cup, defeating Dundee United 1–0 in the final. At the end of the season, Martin O'Neill parted ways with the club, to care for his ill wife.

Martin O'Neill fashioned the most successful Celtic team since the famous Lisbon Lions. Under O'Neill's five year leadership Celtic won the league three times. The two times they did not win the league they lost it by margins of a goal and a point. He also won three Scottish Cups and the League Cup once. In European competition, teams such as Juventus, Porto, Valencia, and Barcelona all visited Glasgow to face Celtic and returned home defeated. He led Celtic to their first European final in 33 years, albeit losing narrowly after extra time. Celtic also commenced an unbeaten run of 77 home matches, which spanned from 2001 to 2004 and notched up an SPL record for the most consecutive wins in a single season. His win percentage of 75% is the highest of any manager in the clubs history. In conclusion, O'Neill's tenure as manager at Celtic was the club's most successful period since the time of Jock Stein.

== Gordon Strachan and Tony Mowbray (2005–2010) ==
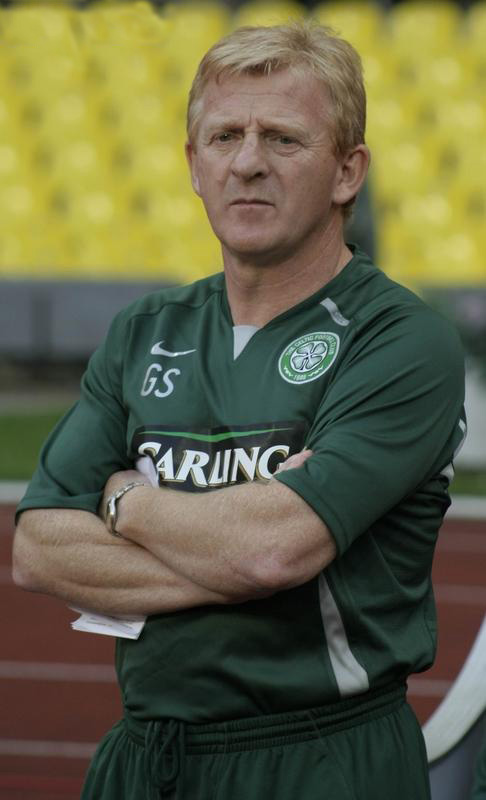
Gordon Strachan

Gordon Strachan was announced in June 2005 as Martin O'Neill's replacement, after apparently being recommended by O'Neill himself. Strachan faced a number of challenges, not least in inheriting an aged squad who were highly expensive and one that had still failed to replace the talismanic Henrik Larsson. Strachan made an unpromising start, in particular his first game in which Celtic lost 0–5 to Slovak side Artmedia Bratislava and recorded their worst ever European result, Celtic, however, quickly regained form and confidence and went on to become the fastest team to win the SPL championship ever, along with the League Cup in the 2005–06 season. The title was clinched before the league was split with a 1–0 home victory over second-placed Hearts. Shaun Maloney had an outstanding season for Celtic and became the first player to win both Player of the Year and Young Player of the Year awards from PFA Scotland in the same season. Celtic's home games that season attracted an average attendance of 58,149, placing Celtic at the time behind only Manchester United in highest average attendance for a football club in the UK.

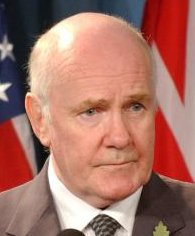
Celtic Chairman 2007-2011, John Reid

During the 2006–07 season Celtic continued their domination of the Scottish Premier League, despite a huge effort by Strachan and the club to reduce the wage bill. Expensive mainstays of the O'Neill years such as Hartson and Sutton, who on average delivered 40 goals per season between them, were moved on and replaced by younger and less expensive players. The team proved unerringly consistent, as had O'Neill's, despite their youth and comparative lack of experience. By the close of the January transfer window, Celtic were 19 points ahead of second-placed Rangers, something which may have been a large contribution to poorer form and dropped points in the second half of the season. They completed their quest for back-to-back titles on 22 April 2007 with a 2–1 win against Kilmarnock. Shunsuke Nakamura ensured the victory with a goal from a free kick from 25 yards in the final minute, leaving Celtic 13 points clear of Rangers with four matches remaining.

That season also saw Strachan guide Celtic into the last 16 of the Champions League for the first time. Celtic secured their progress from the group stages courtesy of Shunsuke Nakamura's 30-yard free-kick against Manchester United in a 1–0 win at Parkhead. The win on the night, and qualification to the last 16, was clinched when Artur Boruc saved Louis Saha's 88th-minute penalty kick. Celtic lost 0–1 in the last 16 round to the eventual winners of the cup, Milan, after a goal from Kaká in extra time. On 26 May 2007, Celtic again won the Scottish Cup, for a 34th time, beating Dunfermline 1–0, completing another league and cup double. The Cup final was also captain Neil Lennon's final appearance as a Celtic player.

On 28 September 2007 it was announced John Reid would become chairman of Celtic and he took over from Brian Quinn on 7 November. Reid is a lifelong supporter of the club and described the appointment as "the greatest honour of my life". His appointment was approved by a large majority of shareholders, though many fans opposed the motion at Celtic's annual general meeting over Reid's role in the British Government during the Iraq War.

The start of Strachan's third season saw further changes to the team. Neil Lennon had left in the summer and centre-half Stephen McManus was now made captain of the side. In May, Celtic completed the signing of midfielder Scott Brown from Hibernian for a fee of around £4.4 million, the largest transfer fee exchanged between two Scottish clubs. Motherwell striker Scott McDonald also arrived at Celtic Park, signed for a fee of £700,000, and having been the player who famously scored two late goals against Celtic on the last day of the season in 2005 to effectively hand Rangers the title.

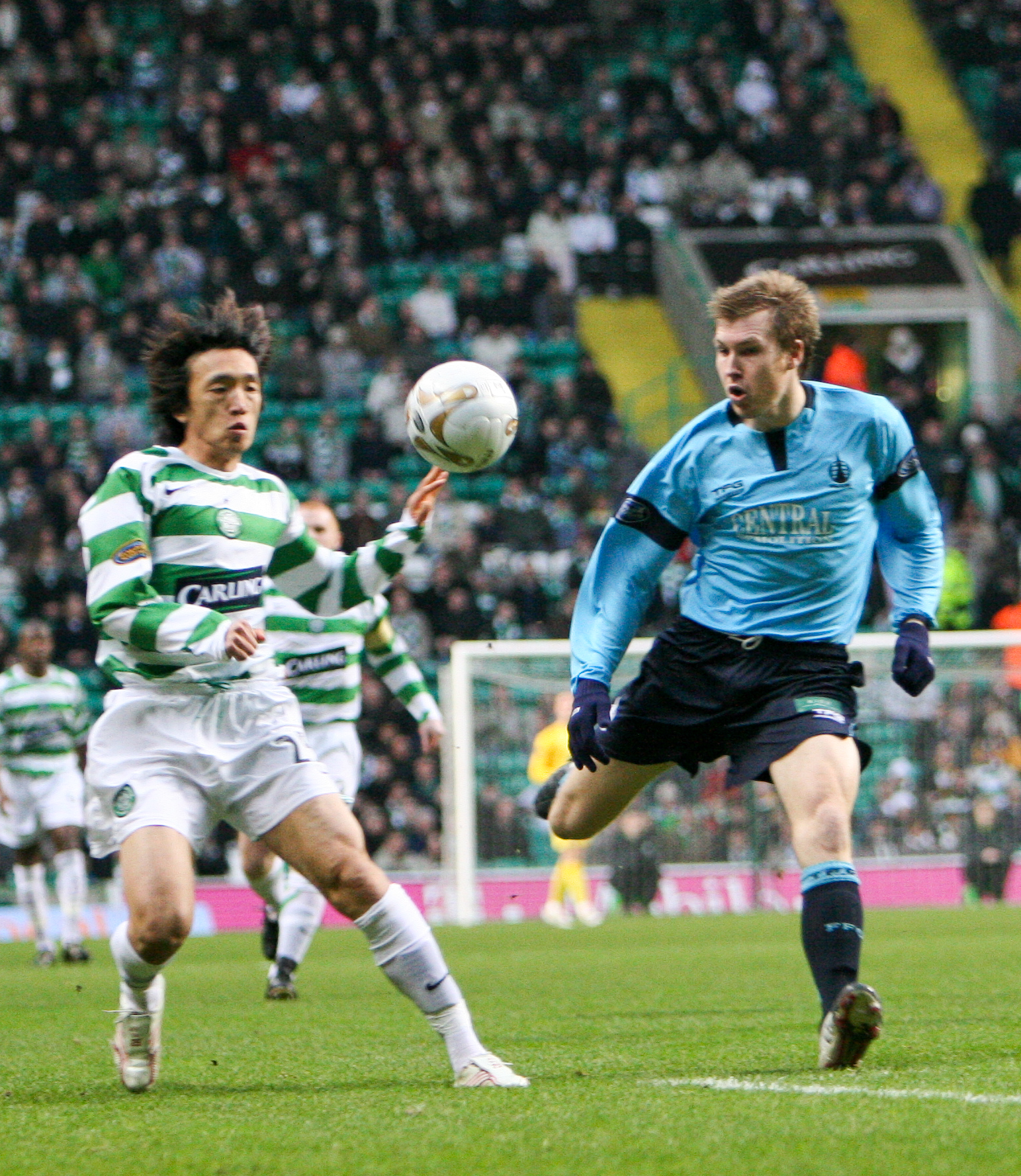
Shunsuke Nakamura against Falkirk in December 2006

As the 2007–08 season progressed, Celtic found themselves embroiled in a tight contest with Rangers for the SPL title. Celtic led for the early part of the season, but a series of poor results in the winter and early spring saw Rangers overtake them. A Kevin Thomson goal on 31 March 2008 gave Rangers a 1–0 win at Ibrox over Celtic, leaving Celtic trailing their rivals in the league by six points. A few days later, Neil Lennon returned to Celtic as a coach, effectively replacing first-team coach Tommy Burns, who was being treated for cancer. A dramatic, and seemingly unlikely, turnaround in Celtic's fortunes then began on 16 April, with a home game against Rangers. A re-invigorated Celtic dominated the opening proceedings and took the lead when Shunsuke Nakamura scored with a spectacular swerving shot from 30 yards. Nacho Novo equalised for Rangers early in the second half, but Celtic got a chance to retake the lead when Nakamura's curling shot was handled off the line by Rangers defender Carlos Cuéllar, who was sent off. Rangers goalkeeper Allan McGregor, however, despite having an injured ankle, saved Scott McDonald's penalty kick. Rangers looked like holding on for a vital point until in the third minute of injury time Jan Vennegoor of Hesselink scored to clinch a 2–1 win for Celtic. Celtic began to claw back on Rangers lead in the league, and by the time of the final league fixture of the season were league leaders. A Vennegoor of Hesselink headed goal gave Celtic a 1–0 win on the night away at Dundee United, clinching the title for Celtic. This ensured Strachan's place in the history books of Celtic, becoming only the third manager to win three successive league titles, behind Willie Maley and Jock Stein. The victory was also dedicated to the memory of Tommy Burns, former player, manager and coach, who had died earlier that week.

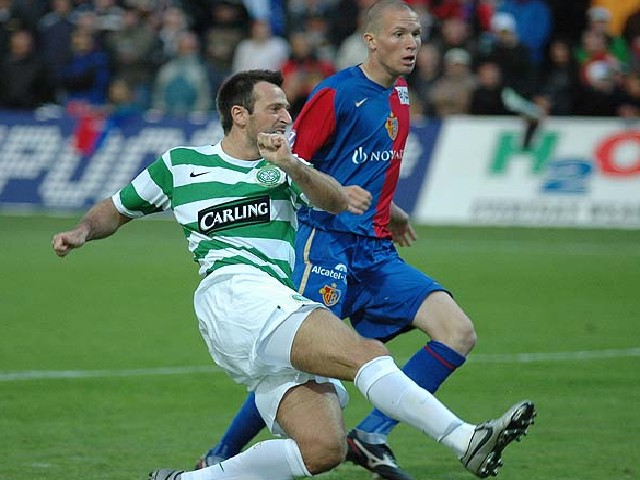
Maiej Zurawski in action for Celtic in a pre-season game against FC Basel in July 2007

The 2007–08 season saw Celtic again taking part in the Champions League. Celtic qualified for the group stages by knocking out Spartak Moscow in the prelims, the tie eventually going to penalty kicks with Artur Boruc saving twice. Celtic won all three home games in the group stages; a last minute Scott McDonald goal giving Celtic a 2–1 win over Milan, Aiden McGeady scoring the only goal in a 1–0 win over Benfica and Massimo Donati scoring an injury time winner against Shakhtar Donetsk. Despite losing all three of their corresponding away fixtures, Celtic qualified for the round of 16 for the second successive season. In the first leg of the round of 16 tie against Barcelona, Celtic twice took the lead at Parkhead, but finished losing 3–2. They were unable to recover the deficit in the return match and were knocked out.

In March 2009, Celtic won the League Cup beating Rangers 2–0 in the final after extra time. Celtic failed to win the SPL title, finishing second to Rangers and Strachan resigned from the manager's position at the end of the season.

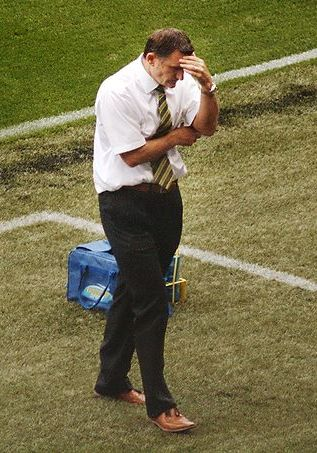
Tony Mowbray, showing the strain

Tony Mowbray was announced as the replacement for Strachan on 16 June 2009. He moved from his managerial post at West Bromwich Albion. It was a return to Celtic for the Englishman after playing there for four years between 1991 and 1995 and is considered to be the player who started the famous Celtic prematch "Huddle". He promised a "Barcelona-esque" style of football, and more attacking play, never afraid to hide his admiration for the likes of Arsenal manager Arsène Wenger. Things started well, he won his first trophy shortly after signing for Celtic, with victory in the Wembley Cup. He brought Marc-Antoine Fortuné, Landry N'Guémo and Danny Fox to the club.

Because of the previous season league position, two qualifying rounds were required to enter the Champions league group stages. After a 1–0 loss to Dynamo Moscow at home, Mowbray lead Celtic to a 2–0 win in Moscow, ending a long run of not winning any away games in the Champions league. This was also the first time ever that Celtic had won a European tie after losing the first leg at home. Celtic were then drawn with English side Arsenal. Celtic lost the home leg, 2–0. In the return leg in the Emirates Stadium, Celtic were holding Arsenal 0–0 until a dive by Arsenal striker Eduardo won them a penalty, which Eduardo stepped up to put the ball past Artur Boruc from the spot, sending Arsenal en route to a 3–1 win. A rejuvenated Massimo Donati scored Celtic's only goal in the last minute.

Things began to slide after that though, Celtic began hemorrhaging points to the so-called "smaller teams" in the league. Celtic then exited the UEFA Europa League before Christmas despite a promising draw of group opponents. Despite a big squad shake-up in the January transfer window, including the departure of club captain Stephen McManus (loaned to Middlesbrough), leading goalscorer Scott McDonald, Barry Robson, the newly acquired Danny Fox and a number of other fringe players; and the bringing in of Republic of Ireland striker Robbie Keane, Diomansy Kamara and others, Tony Mowbray was sacked by the club the day after their 4–0 defeat by St Mirren on 24 March 2010 and Neil Lennon took charge for the remainder of the 2009–10 season.

== Neil Lennon (2010–2014) ==
=== "Bring back the thunder" ===
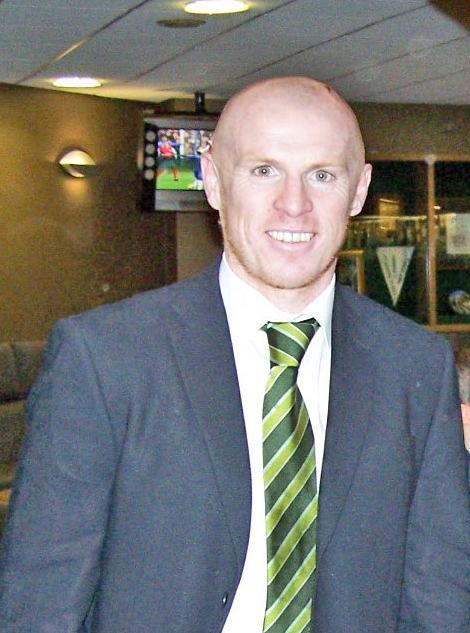
Former Celtic captain, Neil Lennon

Neil Lennon became the caretaker manager after Tony Mowbray was fired, bringing in former teammate Johan Mjällby as his assistant. Celtic were ten points behind Rangers, who had played two less games, when Lennon took over. Despite having no management experience Lennon lead Celtic to eight wins from the eight remaining league matches, finishing six points behind their Old Firm rivals who they also beat 2–1 in the final Old Firm match of the season. This provided a much needed morale boost to the club. Celtic's one chance for silverware was the Scottish Cup, they faced First Division Ross County in the semi-final but lost 2–0. In the aftermath of the Ross County match, Lennon spoke frankly about his opinion of the players and their performances over the course of the season; he said that the players had lacked "hunger and desire" and that whether he was installed as manager or not, he would be recommending a serious clear-out of players to the board.

On 9 June 2010, despite concern over his lack of experience, Lennon was officially announced as the new Celtic manager He retained Mjällby as his assistant, as well as former Celtic teammate Alan Thompson and former Leicester City teammate Garry Parker as first-team coaches Lennon stated his desire to "bring back the thunder" to Celtic Park.

==== 2010–11 ====
Lennon made considerable changes to the Celtic team for the 2010–11 season. A number of players left the club over the summer, including Aiden McGeady, who was sold for a then Scottish record £9.5 million In turn, a large number of talented, young, cheap, relatively unknown players from England and smaller leagues around the world were signed. Several more experienced players also arrived at this time to strengthen the squad. Gary Hooper, Beram Kayal and Emilio Izaguirre all had excellent seasons and earned many plaudits, with Izaguirre winning both the SPFA and Scottish Football Writers' Player of the Year awards. Goalkeeper Fraser Forster, signed on loan from Newcastle United, on became first choice goalkeeper and helped set a new SPL record for most clean sheets in a season.

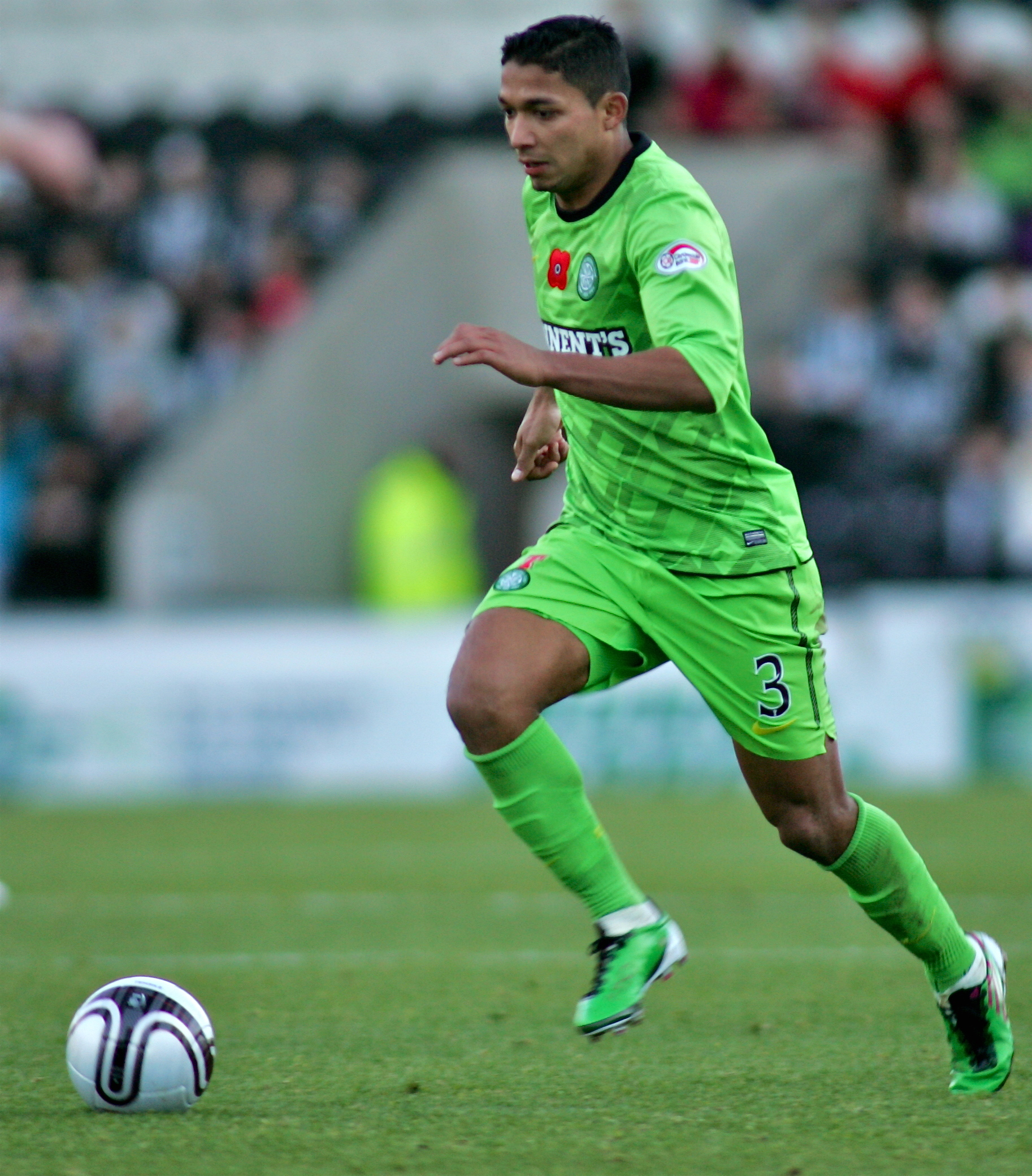
Emilio Izaguirre was voted SPFA Player of the Year in 2011

Celtic were knocked out of the Champions League and Europa League at the first hurdles, losing to Braga and Utrecht respectively. Celtic and Rangers both won their first eight SPL games, but when the sides first clashed Celtic lost 3–1. Celtic played fairly well up until the next Old Firm match, but still went into the New Year fixture at Ibrox as underdogs. However, Celtic won 2–0 thanks to a Georgios Samaras brace and went onto win 15 out of their 19 matches in the second half of the season. Draws at Hamilton Academical and Ibrox, however, as well as losses at Inverness and Motherwell, saw them lose the league by a point. However, Celtic did have the best defensive record only conceding 22 goals.

Celtic got to the final of both domestic cups in 2010–11. They lost the League Cup final 2–1 to Rangers but won the Scottish Cup final 3–0 against Motherwell.

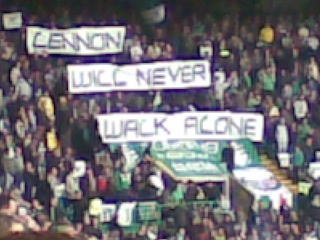
Celtic fans show their support for Neil Lennon in 2011

In 2011, Neil Lennon was subject to a terror campaign. In January he, along with two other Northern Irish, Catholic, Celtic players Niall McGinn and Paddy McCourt, were sent packages containing bullets in the post. In March and April two parcel bombs were sent to high-profile fans of Celtic and two bombs were sent to Lennon. Trish Godman MSP and Paul McBride QC, who had represented Celtic in their court cases with the SFA, were both sent bombs through the Royal Mail. All of the devices were addressed to their places of work. The bombs, described by Strathclyde Police as being designed to "kill or maim", were widely condemned by footballing and political authorities. Scottish Labour leader, Iain Gray, described the act as "terrorism" and First Minister of Scotland Alex Salmond said that, "It is time to remember what we value in society, and unite to condemn those who use football as a pretext for their pathetic and dangerous prejudices." Lennon and his family had to receive 24-hour police protection because of the bombs and threats. He also had to receive police protection at matches due to the threats against him. However, this did not stop a man at a match against Hearts at Tynecastle running onto the pitch and attacking him. Lennon was uninjured, and the man was charged with assault and breach of the peace, both aggravated by religious prejudice.

==== 2011–12 ====
The 2011–12 season saw Celtic make a poor start to their league campaign. Despite rising concerns about their financial situation, Rangers under new manager Ally McCoist topped the league table for the first few months. Celtic were run ragged by Rangers in the first Old Firm game of the season, a 4–2 win for the Ibrox club on 18 September 2011. By October 2011, Celtic were 15 points behind Rangers in the league, albeit Rangers had played two more games than Celtic. On 15 October 2011 at Rugby Park, Celtic trailed 0–3 at half-time to Kilmarnock. Lennon later admitted that had Celtic conceded a further goal he would have resigned. Instead, Celtic rallied in the second half and two goals from Anthony Stokes and a header from Charlie Mulgrew secured an unlikely 3–3 draw. Celtic began to find form, and by Christmas had closed the gap between themselves and Rangers to one point. This run included a 1–0 win over Hearts on 10 December 2011 where Victor Wanyama, signed from Belgium club Beerschot for £900,000 in July, scored his first goal for Celtic with a powerful 25-yard shot. In the same match, Hearts were awarded a controversial penalty in the last minute but Fraser Forster saved Eggert Jonsson's penalty kick.

A Joe Ledley goal on 28 December 2011 gave Celtic a 1–0 win over Rangers at Parkhead, and saw them go top of the table two points clear of Rangers. By February 2012, Celtic had increased their lead to four points. The title was then all but secured when Rangers entered into administration on 14 February 2012, with the Ibrox club incurring a ten-point deduction from the Scottish Premier League. Celtic's unbeaten league run continued up to the next Old Firm game on 25 March 2012 when a poor performance exacerbated by several contentious refereeing decisions saw Rangers win 3–2 and prevent their rivals clinching the league title that day. The title was eventually secured in style a couple of weeks later with an emphatic 6–0 win over Kilmarnock at Rugby Park, Gary Hooper and Charlie Mulgrew both scoring twice. Celtic's next league fixture saw them comfortably beat Rangers 3–0 in a party atmosphere at Parkhead in a match more notable for the Celtic fans colourful banners mocking Rangers on-going financial problems rather than events on the pitch.

The domestic cup tournaments proved a source of disappointment in the 2011–12 season. Celtic reached the League Cup final and were strong favourites to win against unfancied Kilmarnock. However, Celtic were uninspiring on the day and a headed goal six minutes from the end by Dieter van Tornhout won the League Cup for the Ayrshire side. In the Scottish Cup, Celtic reached the semi-final and were drawn to play Hearts. Again, Celtic were not at their best and Craig Beattie's stoppage time penalty secured a 2–1 win for The Jambos.

Celtic qualified for the Europa League group stages in 2011–12 in bizarre circumstances. Swiss side Sion defeated Celtic 3–1 on aggregate in the qualifying tie, however Sion were thrown out of the tournament by UEFA due to them fielding ineligible players in the two games against Celtic. Celtic were reinstated, eventually finishing third in Group I, behind Atlético Madrid and Udinese and ahead of Rennes. Despite failing to progress from the group stages of the Europa League, Celtic had a respectable campaign and their performances on the European stage are considered to have acted as a catalyst for the improvement in their domestic form as the season progressed.

=== A new era ===
==== 2012–13 ====
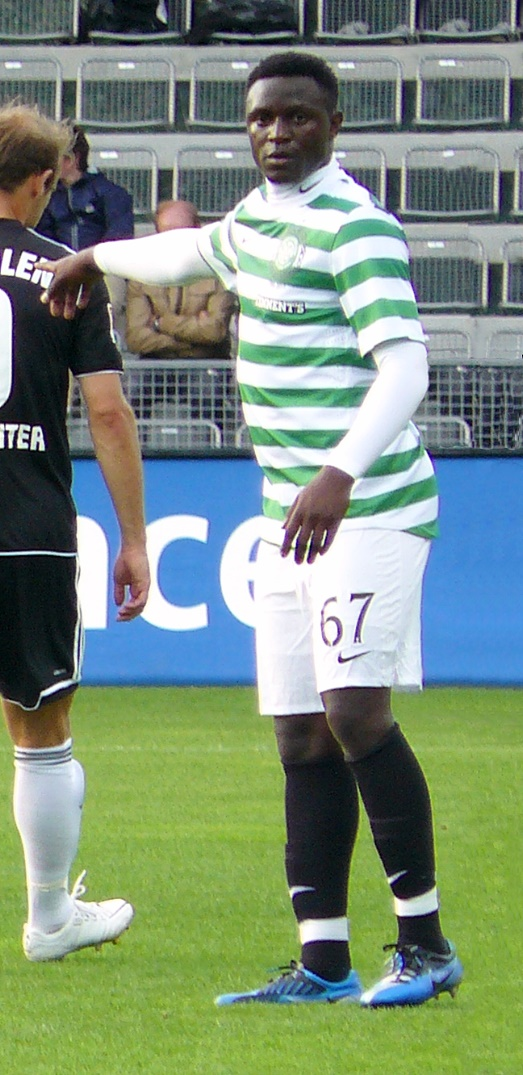
Victor Wanyama - voted the SPL Young Player of the Year in 2013

The summer of 2012 saw extraordinary developments in Scottish football. Rangers, who were being pursued by HM Revenue and Customs (HMRC) for alleged unpaid tax, effectively went into liquidation on 12 June 2012 when HMRC rejected the club's proposed Company Voluntary Arrangement (CVA). A new company was quickly formed and the club re-constituted. However, despite an at-times hysterical media campaign making references to financial "Armageddon" for the other clubs in Scotland, the re-formed Rangers were not allowed re-entry to the Scottish Premier League and instead were placed in the lowest tier of the Scottish Football League, the Third Division.

Ignoring the ongoing furore surrounding Rangers' financial crisis, Celtic went about their 2012–13 league campaign in a steady if not always inspiring manner. Motherwell, Inverness Caley Thistle and briefly Hibernian all either had spells at the top of the table, or thereabouts, but by Christmas Celtic had found a steady run of form to pull themselves comfortably clear of the pack. Celtic eventually clinched their 44th League title on 21 April 2013 with a 4–1 win over Inverness CT at Parkhead. Celtic's run in the League Cup saw them comfortably dispose of Raith Rovers (4–1) and St Johnstone (5–0) in the earlier rounds. St Mirren, however, pulled off an unexpected but deserved 3–2 win over Celtic in the semi-final.

In the Scottish Cup, Celtic knocked out Arbroath, Raith Rovers, and St Mirren in the earlier rounds. In the semi-final at Hampden Park, Celtic won a thrilling match by 4–3 after extra time against Dundee United. Celtic met Hibernian in the Scottish Cup final on 26 May 2013. For the first time in its history, the Cup Final was played on a Sunday. This was done to comply with UEFA regulations which prohibit televised matches being played on the same day as the UEFA Champions League Final. Celtic won the cup and clinched a League and Cup double with a 3–0 win, Gary Hooper scoring twice in the first half before Joe Ledley added a third late on in the second half.

As Scottish Champions from the previous season, Celtic took part in the 2012–13 Champions League, negotiating two qualifying rounds to qualify for the tournament proper. On 2 October 2012, Celtic achieved their first ever away win in the group stages of the Champions League with a 3–2 win in Russia over Spartak Moscow, Georgios Samaras scoring the winning goal in the 90th minute. Celtic's home match with Barcelona in November 2012 coincided with the week of Celtic's 125th Anniversary. As such, an Ultras styled section of the Celtic support called the Green Brigade organised a full stadium pre-match card display (a tifo) to celebrate the club's 125th anniversary. The display featured a Celtic cross, green and white hoops and 125 Celtic in written form, with supporters earning the praise of club chairman Peter Lawwell. A memorable night was completed when goals from Victor Wanyama and 18-year-old striker Tony Watt gave Celtic a shock 2–1 win over Barcelona. Goalkeeper Fraser Forster produced an outstanding performance in the game, winning the praise of the Spanish media who nicknamed him "La Gran Muralla" ("The Great Wall"). Celtic secured their progress to the knock-out stages of the Champions League on 5 December 2012 with a 2–1 home win over Spartak Moscow, Kris Commons scoring the winning goal in 82 minutes with a penalty. Celtic were drawn against Juventus but succumbed to 5–0 aggregate defeat in the Spring of 2013 to go out of the tournament. Despite the emphatic scoreline over the two legs, Celtic were not outclassed by their Italian opponents in terms of general play but while Juventus defended with a ruthless defiance, Celtic in contrast shipped their goals all far too easily. Despite the result against Juventus, Celtic and Neil Lennon won praise for their Champions League campaign.

==== 2013–14 ====
Over the summer, Gary Hooper and Kelvin Wilson were sold to Norwich City and Nottingham Forest respectively, while the highly rated Victor Wanyama was sold to Southampton for a Scottish record fee of £12.5 million. Neil Lennon rebuilt his squad by signing Virgil van Dijk and Amido Baldé in the summer, and Teemu Pukki from Schalke 04 on transfer deadline day.

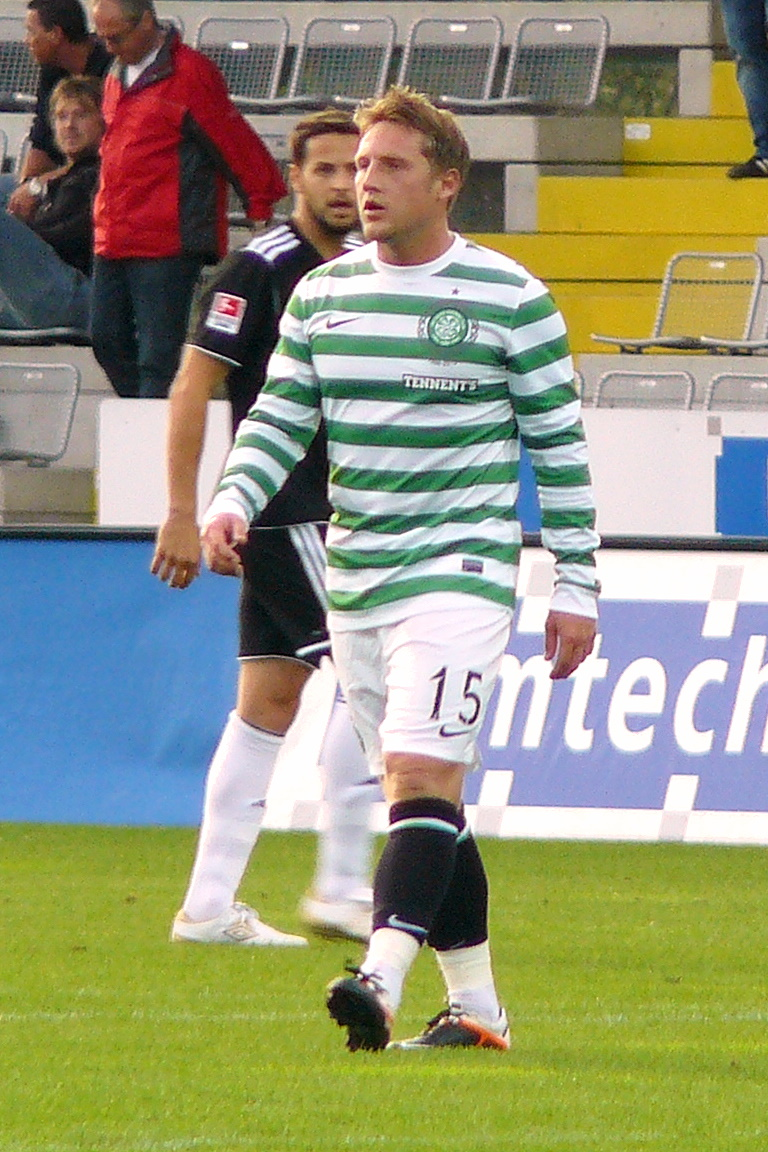
Kris Commons – Celtic's top scorer in 2014 and Scottish Player of the Year

Celtic again started their season playing in the qualifying rounds of the Champions League, knocking out Northern Irish champions Cliftonville and Swedish side IF Elfsborg to reach the final play-off round. Celtic were drawn with Kazakh champions Shakhter Karagandy and found themselves losing the first leg away in Karagandy 2–0. Celtic rallied in the return leg at Celtic Park in the home leg, overcoming the 2–0 deficit to level the aggregate score thanks to goals either side of half-time by Kris Commons and Georgios Samaras. James Forrest completed the comeback for Celtic with a 90th-minute strike, seeing Celtic progress to the Group stages. The campaign from then on was dismal though; winning only once with a 2–1 home win over Ajax, and slumping to a 6–1 rout away against Barcelona in the final group match. That game saw Celtic concede the most goals they had ever done in a single European tie, and equalled their previous heaviest defeat in Europe (5-0 against Artmedia Bratislava).

The domestic campaign had ups and downs; towards the end of February, Celtic had not lost a single game in the league, and drew just twice against Dundee United and Hibernian. Their league success did not translate to cup competition however; going out of the League Cup (0–1 to Greenock Morton), and the Scottish Cup (1–2 to Aberdeen), both at Celtic Park. Celtic also struggled to find a suitable strike partner for Anthony Stokes, forcing Kris Commons into a striking role. Neil Lennon signed former Hibs striker Leigh Griffiths on transfer deadline day in January 2014, as well as Stefan Johansen earlier in the month. After being unable to reach an agreement on a new contract, Joe Ledley left Celtic for Crystal Palace.

On 2 February 2014, goalkeeper Fraser Forster set a new a club-record of 11 league clean sheets in a row, surpassing a record of 10 clean sheets set by Charlie Shaw in the 1921–22 season. On 22 February, he broke Bobby Clark's Scottish League record of 1155 minutes without conceding a goal in a league match. Celtic won 2–0 away at Hearts, and Forster racked up his 13th consecutive clean sheet in the league. Forster's clean sheet run finally ended on 1,256 minutes against Aberdeen on 25 February 2014, as Aberdeen defeated Celtic 2–1 to end their unbeaten run in the league.

Celtic finished the season as league champions again, their third consecutive Scottish League title, scoring 102 goals in the process. Kris Commons was the top scorer in Scotland, netting 32 goals, and won both the PFA Scotland and Scottish Football Writers' Player of the Year awards.

On 22 May 2014, Neil Lennon announced that he was leaving Celtic after four years as manager. "I have parted company with Celtic," the 42-year-old Northern Irishman said in a brief statement, adding, "The club are in a very strong position and I wish the fans and the club all the very best for the future."

== Ronny Deila (2014–2016) ==
Norwegian Ronny Deila was appointed manager of Celtic on 6 June 2014. He signed a 12-month rolling contract with the club, with former Celtic midfielder and Scotland international John Collins appointed as his assistant.

=== 2014–15 ===
After going unbeaten on a pre-season tour in Austria, Deila's first competitive match as manager of Celtic, a Champions League qualifying tie away against KR Reykjavik on 15 July 2014, ended in a 1–0 win with midfielder Callum McGregor scoring the decisive goal on 84 minutes. Celtic eased to a 4–0 win in the return match in Scotland, but were comprehensively beaten and outplayed in the next qualifying round, losing 6–1 on aggregate to Legia Warsaw. Despite this, Celtic were given a reprieve when it was discovered that Legia had fielded an ineligible player in the second leg, Bartosz Bereszyński coming on as a substitute in the last four minutes. UEFA punished the Polish club by awarding the game 3–0 to Celtic, levelling the aggregate score at 4–4 and seeing the Scottish champions progress on away goals. Despite this astonishing piece of luck, Celtic failed abjectly to take advantage in the final qualifier against Maribor, losing 2–1 on aggregate to drop down to the Europa League.

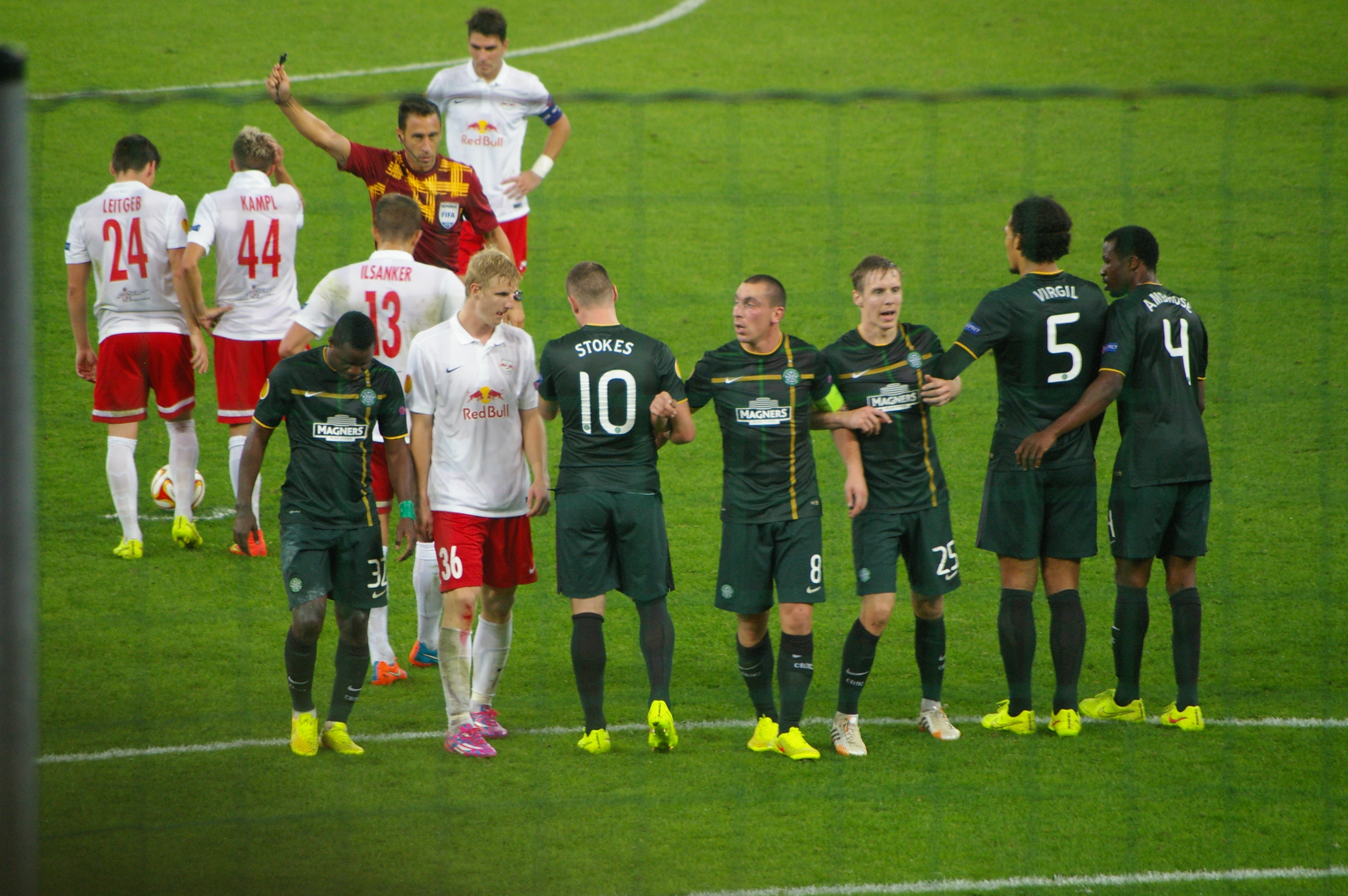
Celtic in action away to Red Bull Salzburg during the group stage of their UEFA Europa League campaign in 2014.

Celtic were unconvincing in the early stages of the league as well, but improved as the season progressed and also qualified from their Europa League group. Deila won the Manager of the Month award for November 2014. By February 2015, Celtic had won 15 of their last 17 domestic games and comfortably defeated Rangers 2–0 in the semi-final of the League Cup. Celtic played Inter Milan in the round of 16 stage of the Europa League, rallying to draw 3–3 at Parkhead from an early 0–2 deficit in a pulsating encounter, then losing 1–0 in Milan to go out on aggregate despite a highly credible performance. In the league, Celtic thrashed second-placed Aberdeen 4–0 on 1 March to go six points clear with a game in hand and a vastly superior goal difference. It was Celtic's eighth consecutive win in the league, and the turn around in form saw previous critics of Deila review their opinion of him. Former Celtic striker John Hartson had branded Deila as "clueless" in October, but now stated that Deila has "..turned it round to his credit and they’re playing some brilliant football at the moment".

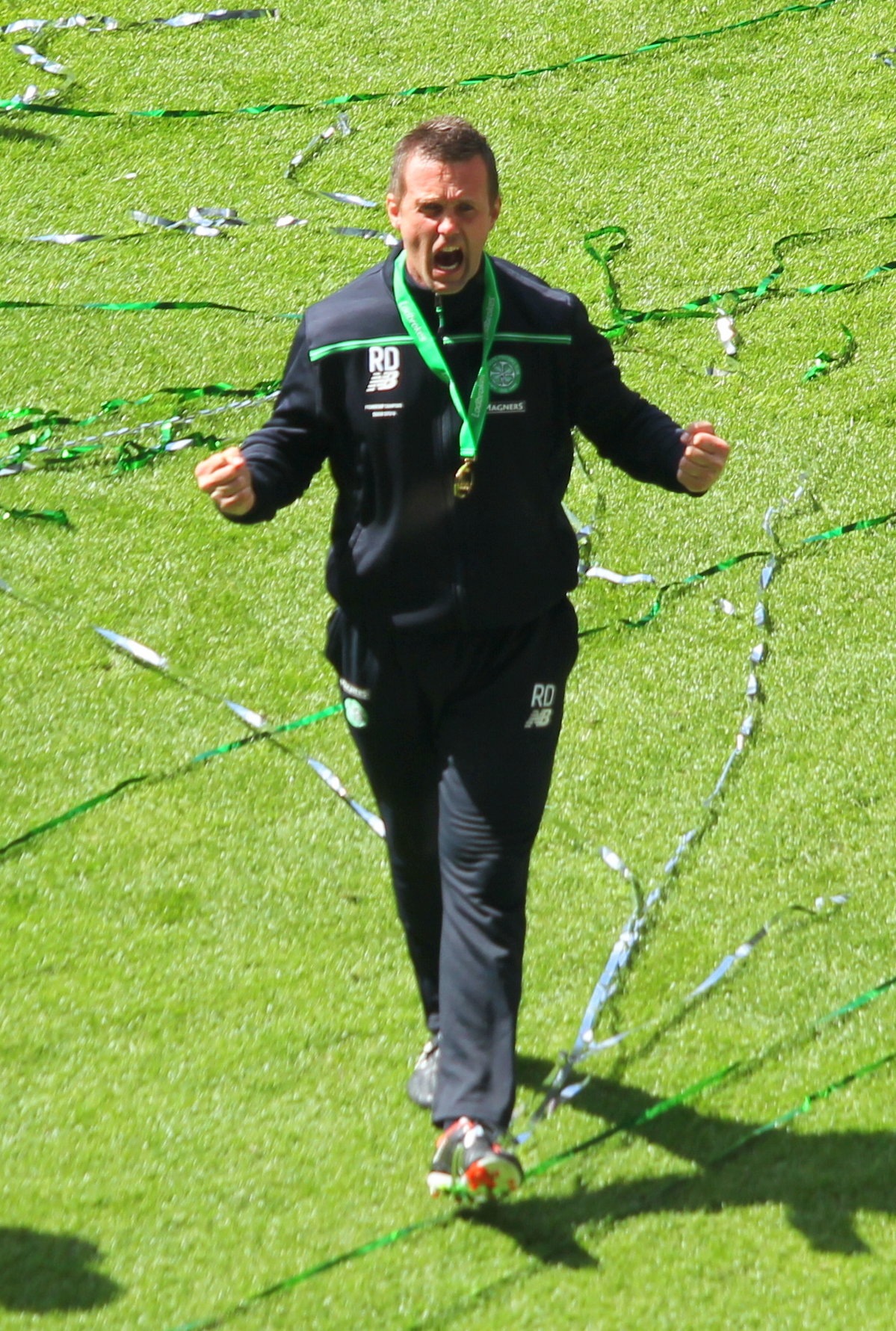
Deila celebrating winning the 2015–16 Scottish Premiership league title in May 2016

In March 2015, Celtic agreed a new kit deal with Boston-based sportswear manufacturer New Balance to replace Nike from the start of the 2015–16 season. It is believed to be the biggest kit contract in the club's history, outdoing the decade-long deal with Nike who paid Celtic £5 million a year to make their shirts.

Deila won his first trophy at Celtic on 15 March; Celtic's defeating Dundee United 2–0 in the League Cup final. Kris Commons opened the scoring in the first half and James Forrest steered the ball into the net from 20 yards out to double Celtic's lead in the second half. Celtic's bid for a domestic treble ended when they were beaten by Inverness Caledonian Thistle in the semi-final of the Scottish Cup on 19 April 2015. The match however was controversial, with Inverness defender Josh Meekings' deliberate handball of Leigh Griffiths' goal-bound header just before half-time going unpunished by the match officials. Insult was added to injury in the second half when Craig Gordon was sent off (correctly) for fouling Marley Watkins in the penalty box. Greg Tansey converted the resultant penalty to level the tie at 1–1. Down to ten men, Celtic struggled for the rest of the match and eventually lost 3–2 after extra-time.

Celtic clinched their fourth successive league title in May, with manager Deila commenting "We've had a terrific few months - we deserved to win the league."

=== 2015–16 ===
Celtic began the season again attempting to qualify for the Champions League. They knocked out Stjarnan from Iceland and Qarabağ from Azerbaijan in the early qualifying rounds, but lost 4–3 on aggregate to Swedish side Malmö FF in the final play-off round. This meant for the second successive season, Celtic dropped in to the Europa League. Celtic's Europa League campaign was poor and littered with individual errors which contributed to dropped points in every match. Celtic failed to qualify, finishing bottom of their group, and was the first time Celtic went through a group stage of a European competition without recording a single victory.

Deila was criticised for Celtic's poor European campaign, and a series of indifferent performances in the league saw him placed under further scrutiny. In April 2016, Celtic suffered a 5–4 loss on penalties to Old Firm rivals Rangers in the semi-final of the Scottish Cup, after a 2–2 extra-time draw in which Celtic fought back against the newly promoted Championship side twice to level the score. Three days later, Deila announced his resignation from his post once Celtic had finished the season. Nevertheless, Deila led Celtic to their fifth consecutive League championship, clinching the title on 8 May with a 3–2 win over nearest challengers Aberdeen. Celtic finished the season a week later with an emphatic 7–0 win over Motherwell, seeing Deila depart the club on a high note after two years in charge. The seventh goal in that game was scored by debutant Jack Aitchison, who at 16 years and 71 days old became both the youngest player ever to represent the club in a competitive match and the youngest goalscorer.

Although Celtic had been generally mediocre, striker Leigh Griffiths had an outstanding season, scoring 40 goals and winning both the PFA Scotland and Scottish Football Writers' Association Player of the Year awards. The season also saw 18 year old Kieran Tierney emerge as one of the most promising prospects in Scottish football, establishing himself as first-choice left-back at Celtic and making his full international debut for Scotland.

== Brendan Rodgers: Invincibles and trebles ==
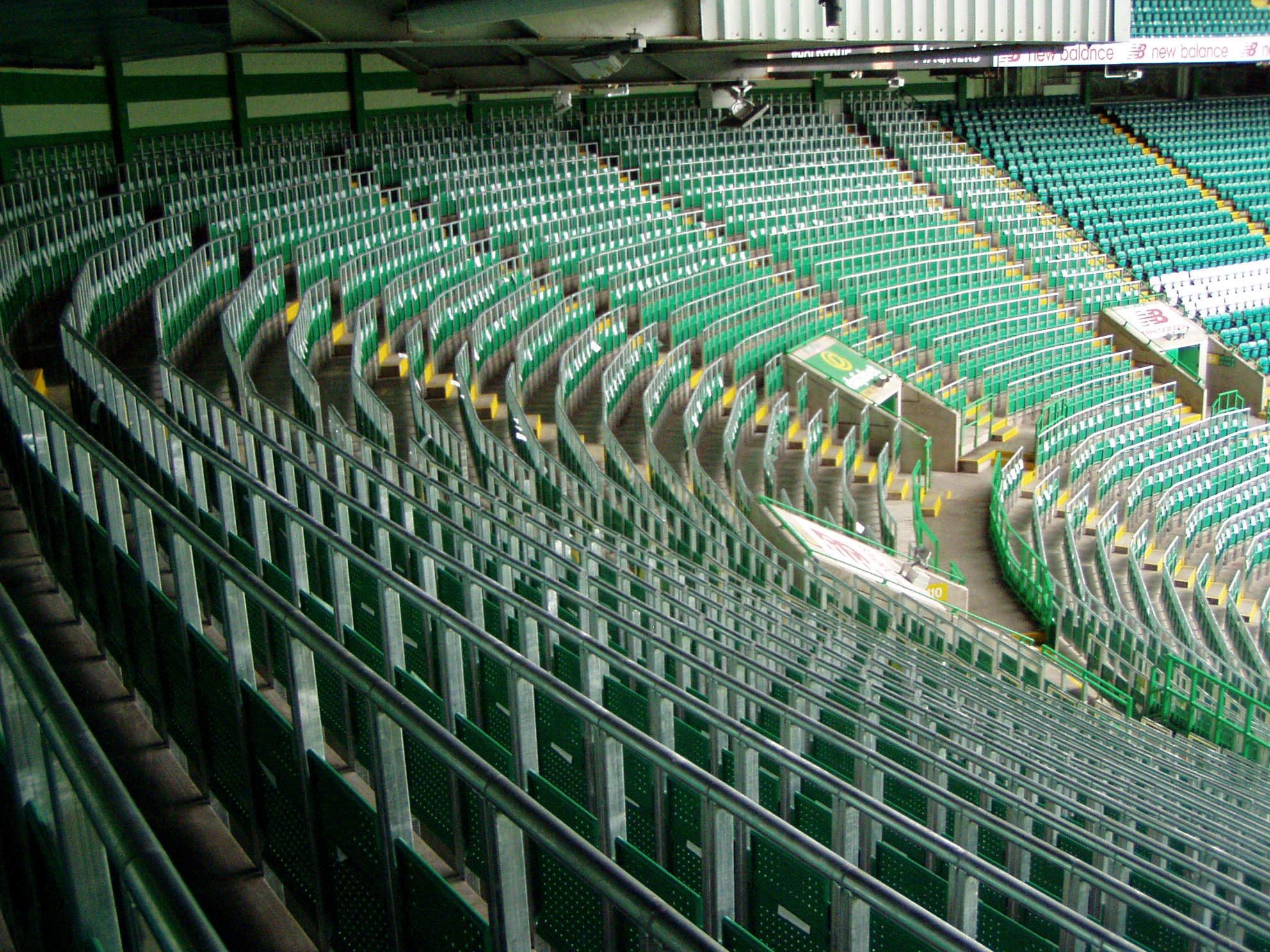
Rail seating at Celtic Park

On 20 May 2016, it was confirmed that 43-year-old Brendan Rodgers would take over at the club with immediate effect, the Irishman having previously managed Swansea City and Liverpool in the English Premier League. In the days that followed, Chris Davies was named as assistant manager and Glen Driscoll appointed as head of performance. Both men had previously worked with Rodgers at Swansea and Liverpool.

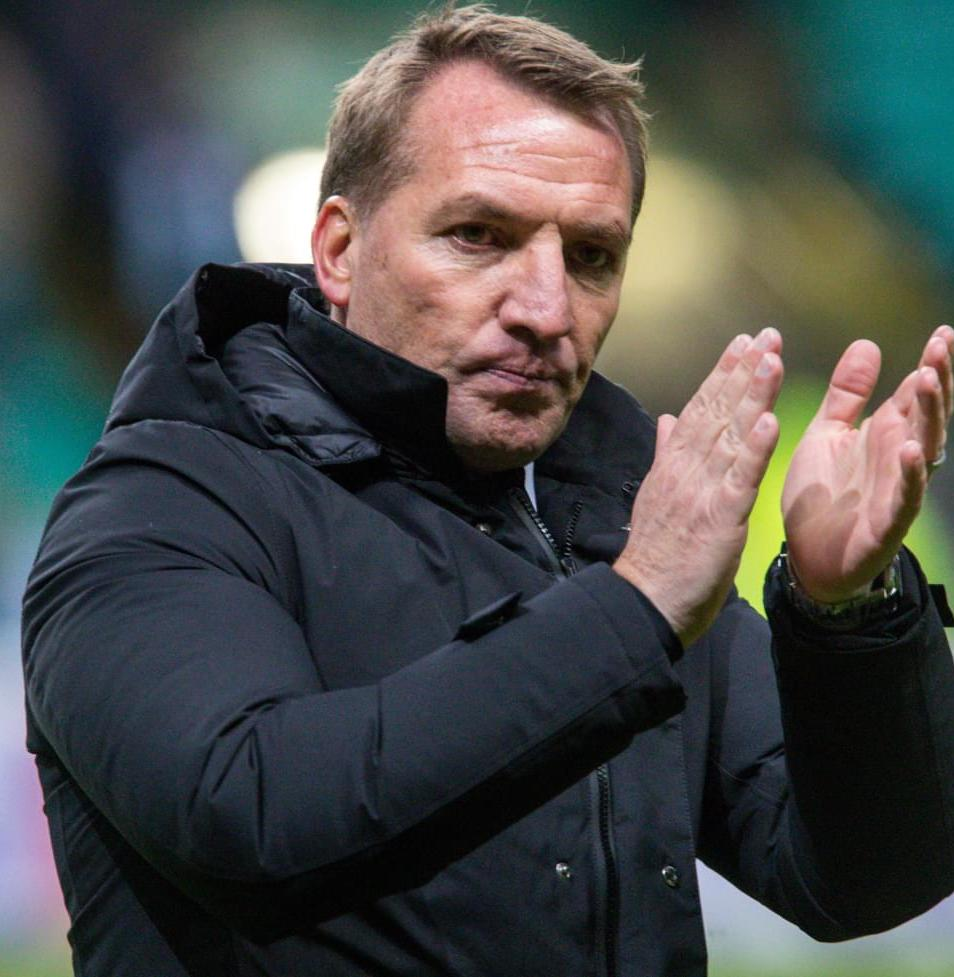
Brendan Rodgers led Celtic to two consecutive domestic trebles

On 14 July 2016, Celtic formally unveiled their new 2,600 capacity "rail seating" area within Celtic Park, becoming the first British club to do so. The club had obtained a "safe standing" certificate 13 months earlier after years of negotiations with supporters, football authorities and Glasgow City Council. Rail seating is particularly common in Germany's Bundesliga, most notably at Borussia Dortmund's Westfalenstadion, a ground with a reputation on par with Celtic Park for its intensity and atmosphere.

=== 2016–17 ===
Celtic's first competitive match under Rodgers, saw the team lose 1–0 against Gibraltarian minnows Lincoln Red Imps in the first leg of the Second Round Champions League qualifiers, a result described by The Scotsman as a "humiliation" and mooted by other media as being one of the worst results in the club's history. Celtic quickly found their feet though, winning the second leg 3–0 and going on to eliminate Astana and Hapoel Be'er Sheva in the subsequent qualifying rounds to progress into the Champions League group stages for the first time since 2013. Celtic's new signings Scott Sinclair and Moussa Dembélé also helped the club make a strong start to their league campaign, with Sinclair scoring in each of the first six league matches and Dembélé scoring a hat-trick in Celtic's 5–1 win over newly promoted Rangers, becoming the first Celtic player to score three goals against Rangers since Harry Hood in 1973.

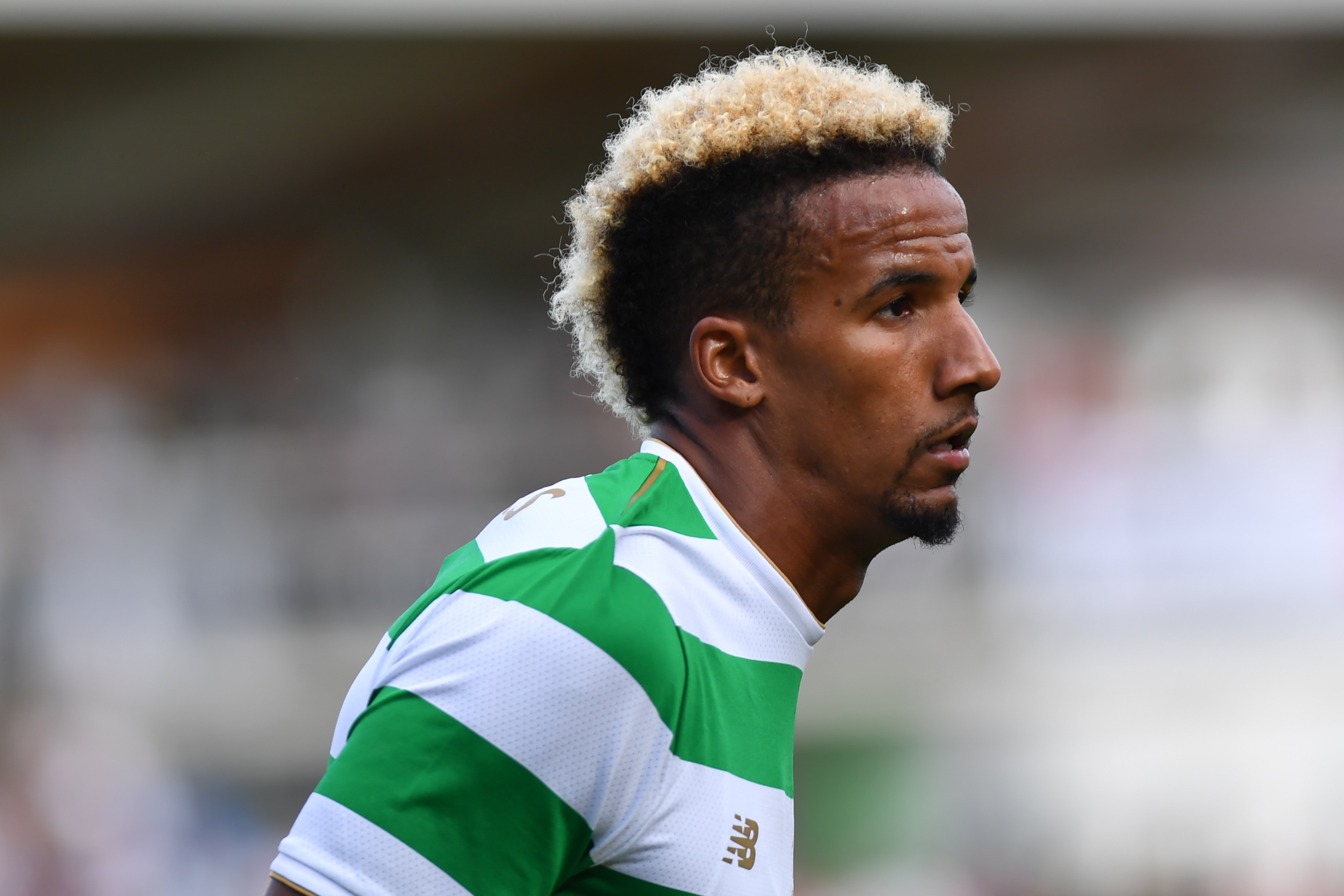
Scott Sinclair, one of Brendan Rodger's new signings, scored in each of Celtic's first six league matches of the season, and finished as top goalscorer in the Scottish Premiership

The team's opening match in the Champions League on 13 September 2016 proved to be a humbling experience though as Barcelona delivered a footballing lesson in a 7–0 rout, the club's heaviest ever European defeat and the second-heaviest in the club's history. A level of pride was restored in the next Champions League tie, Celtic holding Manchester City to a 3–3 draw at Celtic Park and ending the high-spending English club's run of ten consecutive wins, with Dembélé scoring twice. Further draws away at Borussia Mönchengladbach and in the return match at Manchester City saw Celtic finish the group on three points, albeit coming fourth and going out of Europe.

Celtic continued their unbeaten run in domestic competitions into the New Year, during which time the club won their 100th major trophy, defeating Aberdeen 3–0 in the League Cup Final on 27 November 2016. Celtic's 5–2 win away at St Johnstone on 5 February 2017 saw them extend their lead in the league to 27 points over second-placed Aberdeen, and was their 19th consecutive league win, with the only points dropped in the season so far being in a 2–2 draw away at Inverness in September. They continued undefeated through March, going to extend their winning run to 22 consecutive league games, although dropped points in a 1–1 draw at Parkhead against Rangers. Celtic clinched their sixth successive league title on 2 April 2017, with a record eight league games to spare. As Celtic's unbeaten domestic run continued, they subjected Rangers to their heaviest defeat at Ibrox since 1915, thrashing their rivals 5–1 on 29 April. Celtic's 2–0 win over Hearts on 21 May saw them finish 30 points ahead of second-placed Aberdeen in the league, win a record 106 points, and the team become the first Scottish side to complete a top-flight season undefeated since 1899. On 27 May 2017, Celtic clinched their fourth treble by defeating Aberdeen 2–1 in the Scottish Cup final, with Tom Rogic scoring the winning goal in injury time. The cup final win saw Celtic go through the entire domestic season unbeaten.

=== 2017–18 ===
Celtic entered the 2017–18 UEFA Champions League at the 2nd qualifying round, they defeated Linfield 6–0, Rosenborg 1–0 and Astana 8–4 on aggregate to enter the group stages. Celtic achieved only 3 points over the six games, but did win 3–0 away at Anderlecht, their first group stages (Champions League and Europa League) win in 16 games. Celtic finished the group in third place despite losing 5–0 (at home) and 7–1 (away) to Paris Saint Germain.

On 26 November 2017, Celtic won their fourth consecutive domestic trophy, for the first time since Jock Stein's side in 1970, with a 2–0 win against Motherwell in the Scottish League Cup final. Celtic set the British record for consecutive unbeaten domestic games at 69, beating their own record of 62 set by Willie Maley's side in 1917, before finally losing 4–0 to Hearts. Over 585 days, Celtic won 60 of those 69 games, drawing the other 9, with 197 goals scored and 38 clean sheets in the process. Brendan Rodgers said of his Celtic team after the loss to Hearts, that "They've set a record that may well never be beaten".

By finishing third in the Champions League group stages, Celtic qualified for the knockout round of 32 in the Europa League where they were drawn against Zenit Saint Petersburg. Celtic won the first leg 1–0 after a late winner by Callum McGregor, but succumbed to a disappointing 3–0 defeat in Saint Petersburg and were subsequently knocked out of the competition.

On 29 April 2018, Celtic secured their seventh consecutive league title with a 5–0 win over Rangers at Celtic Park. This win also extended Celtic's unbeaten run over Rangers to 12 games. Celtic's season ended on 19 May 2018 when they secured the first ever 'Double-Treble' (a treble in two consecutive seasons) in Scottish football history with a 2–0 Scottish Cup Final win over Motherwell.

=== 2018–19 ===
Into his third season, Rodgers led Celtic to another League Cup, defeating Aberdeen in the final, and by February 2019 the club were eight points clear in the league. However, on 26 February 2019 Rodgers left Celtic in a surprise move to take over as manager of Leicester City.

== Return of Neil Lennon ==
=== 2018–19 ===
Neil Lennon returned to Celtic to work as caretaker manager until the end of the season. He went on to help Celtic complete their eighth successive league title, and then to a 2–1 win over Hearts in the 2019 Scottish Cup Final to clinch the treble for the third season in a row (the "treble treble"). The following week, Lennon was confirmed as full-time manager for the second time.

=== 2019–20 ===
Into the first full season of his second spell as manager, Neil Lennon led Celtic to a 1–0 win over Rangers in the 2019 Scottish League Cup Final, the club's tenth consecutive domestic trophy. They failed again to qualify for the UEFA Champions League, but enjoyed a successful group stage campaign in the Europa League in which they topped a European group for the first time in their history. During the group stages, Celtic twice defeated Lazio (2–1 in both games), with Olivier Ntcham's injury time winning goal in Rome clinching the club's first ever competitive victory in Italy. By March 2020, Celtic were 13 points clear in the league and well on the way to a ninth consecutive title: However, all professional football in Scotland was suspended later that month due to the COVID-19 pandemic in the United Kingdom, with media demands made for the league season to be declared "null and void". On 18 May, the SPFL officially ended the season, and Celtic were awarded their ninth consecutive league title. The completion of the 2019-20 Scottish Cup was delayed due to the ongoing COVID-19 pandemic, with the semi-finals and final not taking place until late autumn/ winter of 2020. Celtic and Hearts reached the final that took place on 20 December 2020. The match went to penalty-kicks after the sides tied at 3–3 after extra time, with Celtic going on to win the penalty shoot-out to clinch a fourth successive treble.

=== 2020–21 ===
Due to the ongoing COVID-19 Pandemic, season 2020–21 started behind closed doors. Celtic suffered a string of disappointing results in European competition, exiting the Champions League in a 2–1 home defeat to Hungarian side Ferencvárosi TC in the Second Qualifying Round. They dropped down to the Europa League, and were drawn as the top seed in a group with AC Milan, Lille OSC and Sparta Prague. They started the group poorly, losing to Milan and drawing to Lille, before being eliminated after being defeated 4–1 both home and away by Sparta Prague.

In the league, Celtic were competing for their tenth consecutive league title, which would move them ahead of the current record of consecutive league titles jointly held by themselves (1965–1974, 2011–2020) and Rangers (1988–1997). After starting the league campaign well, Celtic began to falter dramatically; losing to Rangers in the opening derby in the season, and also dropping points away to Kilmarnock, Aberdeen and Hibernian before the end of November. In addition to poor results, performances in games which they did win were poor and widely criticised by the club's support. The club were also eliminated from the League Cup by Ross County, marking the end of a 35-game unbeaten cup run, with the result met with fan protests after the game, with players leaving the ground under a police escort. After another league loss to Rangers at the beginning of January, the team travelled to Dubai for a warm weather training camp despite the continuing COVID-19 Pandemic. The move was much maligned by fans, media and the Scottish Government, and after a player came back positive for the disease Lennon, thirteen players and two other staff members were forced to self-isolate: This meant they would miss the next two matches against Hibernian and Livingston. Celtic drew both those games, and after further defeats to St Mirren and Ross County, they were left 18 points behind league leaders Rangers by late February - all but ending the club's hopes of "ten in a row". In the days following the defeat to Ross County, Neil Lennon resigned, bringing to an end his second stint as the manager of the club. Assistant manager John Kennedy was announced as interim manager until the end of the season.

Celtic drew Kennedy's second game in charge away to Dundee United, resulting in Rangers being confirmed as league champions and bringing to an end Celtic's run of nine consecutive league titles. Defeat the following month to Rangers in the fifth round of the Scottish Cup ended the club's streak of four consecutive triumphs in the competition, and condemned them to their first trophy-less season since 2010. Further ignominy was to be suffered in May when they suffered their largest derby defeat in a decade, losing 4–1 to Rangers at Ibrox.

== Ange Postecoglou ==
On 10 June 2021, Ange Postecoglou was announced as the new manager of Celtic. His first couple of months as manager was a period of upheaval, with 12 first-team players leaving during the summer transfer window while 10 new players were signed. Celtic lost three of their opening six league matches, but enjoyed high-scoring wins over Dundee and St Mirren. Improved form in October saw Postecoglou win the Manager of the Month award, with new signings Jota and Kyogo Furuhashi flourishing in the side. In December, Celtic won the first domestic trophy of the season, defeating Hibernian 2–1 in the League Cup Final. On 11 May 2022 in a 1–1 draw away at Dundee United, Postecoglou's Celtic reclaimed the Scottish Premiership to secure a League and League Cup double in the Australian's first season in Glasgow.

== See also ==
- History of Celtic F.C. (1887–1994)
