= Jim Farry =

Scottish football executive (1954–2010)

James Farry (1 July 1954 – 10 November 2010) was chief executive of the Scottish Football Association from 1990 to 1999. Farry was forced to leave that post due to a dispute with Celtic over the registration of player Jorge Cadete.

== Early life ==
Farry attended school in East Kilbride, before working as a landscape gardener, milkman and window cleaner. He first joined the Scottish Football Association (SFA) in 1972 as an administration assistant. In the late 1970s he was appointed secretary of the Scottish Football League, a position he held for over 10 years. Farry earned a reputation as an efficient administrator during his stint as league secretary. When the same position at the SFA became vacant in 1990, he was appointed as the successor to the departing Ernie Walker.

== SFA chief executive ==
While chief executive, Farry oversaw the project to renovate Scotland's national football stadium Hampden Park. The 'new Hampden' as it was termed, drew both support and criticism, with opinion divided over the need for a dedicated national stadium within Scotland. As the stadium is used at club level by Queen's Park, an amateur team currently playing in the lower divisions and possessing limited support, some footballing figures had argued that an existing stadium could have been a home for the Scottish national team indefinitely. Alternatively, supporters of the stadium have pointed to the awarding of UEFA elite status and the hosting of a number of high-profile matches, most notably the 2002 UEFA Champions League Final and the 2007 UEFA Cup Final, as proof of the renovation's success.

=== Diana, Princess of Wales controversy ===
In 1997, Farry attracted criticism from some parts of the media in the aftermath of the death of Diana, Princess of Wales, after he publicly rejected calls to cancel a scheduled international match between Scotland and Belarus on the day of the Princess's funeral. He later revealed that he had been advised by Buckingham Palace to let the game go ahead; however after a hostile reaction from the media and certain sections of society, the match was eventually rescheduled. Labour MP Jimmy Hood and the Daily Record newspaper called on Farry to resign, while Rangers players Ally McCoist, Andy Goram and Gordon Durie had refused to play in the match if it had been played on the day of the funeral.

=== Jorge Cadete ===
In 1999, an independent commission was called to examine allegations made by the then Celtic managing director and majority shareholder Fergus McCann concerning the registration of Portuguese player Jorge Cadete in 1996. A player must be registered with the SFA before he is permitted to play in matches in Scotland. A delay in the registration had forced Cadete to miss a Scottish Cup semi-final against their Old Firm rivals Rangers, which Celtic lost 2–1. McCann claimed that the delay was deliberate and the commission ruled in his favour. On 8 March 1999, Farry was sacked for gross misconduct.

== Life after football ==
As of 2009, Farry was employed as a business development manager by medium-sized construction and refurbishment firm AKP Scotland, based in East Kilbride. He was also a patron of Cambuslang Rugby Club.

Following a massive heart attack in his home in Cambuslang, Farry died on 10 November 2010 in Hairmyres Hospital, East Kilbride, shortly afterwards. He was survived by his wife and two children.
