= 1999–2000 Celtic F.C. season =

Celtic
1999–2000 season
- Manager: John Barnes; Kenny Dalglish
- Stadium: Celtic Park
- Scottish Premier League: 2nd
- Scottish Cup: Third round
- Scottish League Cup: Winners
- UEFA Cup: Second round
- Top goalscorer: League: Mark Viduka (25); All: Mark Viduka (27)
Home colours	Away colours

The 1999–2000 season was the 106th season of competitive football by Celtic. Celtic competed in the Scottish Premier League, UEFA Cup, Scottish League Cup and the Scottish Cup.

== Summary ==
The season saw Celtic finish second in the league, 21 points behind the winners, Rangers. They won the League Cup beating Aberdeen in the final, and reached the second round of the UEFA Cup, losing to Lyon. They were knocked out of the Scottish Cup in the third round by Inverness Caledonian Thistle.

== Transfers ==
=== In ===
Date	Player	From	Fee
20 June 1999	(Bulgaria) Stilyan Petrov	(Bulgaria) CSKA Sofia	£2,800,000
22 June 1999	(Russia) Dmitri Kharine	(England) Chelsea	Free
8 July 1999	(Israel) Eyal Berkovic	(England) West Ham United	£5,750,000
8 July 1999	(Ivory Coast) Olivier Tebily	(England) Sheffield United	£1,250,000
10 July 1999	(Netherlands) Bobby Petta	(England) Ipswich Town	Free
23 July 1999	(France) Stephane Bonnes	(France) Mulhouse	Free
28 October 1999	(England) Ian Wright	(England) West Ham United	Free
1 December 1999	(Venezuela) Fernando de Ornelas	(England) Crystal Palace	Free
22 December 1999	(Brazil) Rafael Scheidt	(Brazil) Gremio	£5,000,000
23 March 2000	(Scotland) Paul Shields	(Scotland) Raith Rovers	£100,000

=== Out ===
Date	Player	To	Fee
29 June 1999	(Scotland) Simon Donnelly	(England) Sheffield Wednesday	Free
29 June 1999	(Scotland) Phil O'Donnell	(England) Sheffield Wednesday	Free
23 July 1999	(Italy) Enrico Annoni		Retired
1 September 1999	(England) Tommy Johnson	(England) Everton	Loan
18 October 1999	(Scotland) Tosh McKinlay	(Switzerland) Grasshopper Club Zürich	Free
1 December 1999	(Scotland) Craig Burley	(England) Derby County	£3,000,000
10 January 2000	(Norway) Harald Brattbakk	(Denmark) FC Copenhagen	£500,000
14 February 2000	(England) Ian Wright	(England) Burnley	Free

- Expenditure: ▼£15,050,000
- Income: ▲£3,500,000
- Total loss/gain: ▼£11,550,000

== Managers ==
=== Managers ===
Celtic started the season under the newly appointed John Barnes who, on 10 February, was sacked by the club. Celtic's Director of Football Kenny Dalglish took over as caretaker manager.

== Results and fixtures ==
Win Draw Loss

=== Friendlies ===
13 July 1999 Friendly	Ham Kam	2–3	Celtic	Briskeby Arena
	mBrannstorph 57'; Novak 64'		Bonnes 15'; Blinker 43'; Brattbakk 87'	Attendance: 1,000; Referee: Berntsen

16 July 1999 Friendly	Aalborg BK	0–3	Celtic	Gjemselund Stadion
		Report	Viduka 3', 13', 90'	Attendance: 649; Referee: Pedersen

20 July 1999 Friendly	Kongsvinger	1–3	Celtic	Gjemselund Stadion
	ALM 19' (Penalty)	Report	Burchill 13', 24'; Larsson 32'	Attendance: 500; Referee: Berntsen

24 July 1999 Friendly	Celtic	1–2	Leeds United	Celtic Park
	Petta	Report	Smith 10'; Tébily 48'	Attendance: 52,715; Referee: McCluskey

27 July 1999 Friendly	Celtic	2–0	Newcastle United	Celtic Park
	Tébily 51'; Viduka 61'	Report		Attendance: 59,252; Referee: Orr

3 August 1999 Friendly	Bray Wanderers	0–2	Celtic	Tolka Park
			Johnson 7'; Brattbakk 76'	Attendance: 5,000; Referee: Byrne

12 January 2000 Friendly	Louletano	2–2	Celtic	Estádio Algarve
	Jaques 8'; Zezinho 10'		Petta 45'; Berkovic 90'	Attendance: 200

15 January 2000 Friendly	Fortuna Düsseldorf	0–3	Celtic	Estádio Algarve
			Wright 7'; Healy 43'; Viduka 69'	Attendance: 100

1 February 2000 Ronnie Moran’s Testimonial	Liverpool	4–1	Celtic	Anfield
	Meijer 38', 68'; Thompson 45'; Camara 53'	Report	Dailly 76'	Attendance: 33,300; Referee: Foy

=== Premier League ===
1 August 1999 Premier League	Aberdeen	0–5	Celtic	Aberdeen
18:05 BST		Report	Larsson 4', 52'; Viduka 35', 41'; Burchill 90'	Stadium: Pittodrie Stadium; Attendance: 16,080; Referee: Stuart Dougal

7 August 1999 Premier League	Celtic	3–0	St Johnstone	Glasgow
15:00 BST	Mjällby 6'; Viduka 28'; Wieghorst 50'	Report		Stadium: Celtic Park; Attendance: 60,253; Referee: Mike McCurry

15 August 1999 Premier League	Dundee United	2–1	Celtic	Dundee
18:05 BST	Easton 12'; Dodds 42'	Report	Berkovic 82'	Stadium: Tannadice Park; Attendance: 12,375

21 August 1999 Premier League	Dundee	1–2	Celtic	Dundee
15:00 BST	Sharp 86'	Report	Mahé 68'; Larsson 88'	Stadium: Dens Park; Attendance: 10,531; Referee: John Rowbotham

29 August 1999 Premier League	Celtic	4–0	Hearts	Glasgow
15:00 BST	Viduka 17'; Larsson 36'; Berkovic 70', 72'	Report		Stadium: Celtic Park; Attendance: 59,697; Referee: Jim McCluskey

12 September 1999 Premier League	Kilmarnock	0–1	Celtic	Kilmarnock
18:05 BST		Report	Burchill 72'	Stadium: Rugby Park; Attendance: 14,328; Referee: Kenny Clark

25 September 1999 Premier League	Hibernian	0–2	Celtic	Edinburgh
15:00 BST		Report	Viduka 56', 66'	Stadium: Easter Road; Attendance: 14,473; Referee: Hugh Dallas

16 October 1999 Premier League	Celtic	7–0	Aberdeen	Glasgow
15:00 BST	Berkovic 16'; Larsson 40', 43', 73'; Viduka 61', 64', 88'	Report		Stadium: Celtic Park; Attendance: 60,003; Referee: Stuart Dougal

24 October 1999 Premier League	St Johnstone	1–2	Celtic	Perth
18:05 BST	Lowndes 29'	Report	Burchill 48'; Wieghorst 90+3'	Stadium: McDiarmid Park; Attendance: 10,022; Referee: Hugh Dallas

27 October 1999 Premier League	Celtic	0–1	Motherwell	Glasgow
19:45 GMT		BBC Report	Twaddle 15'	Stadium: Celtic Park; Attendance: 58,731; Referee: Douglas MacDonald

30 October 1999 Premier League	Celtic	5–1	Kilmarnock	Glasgow
15:00 GMT	Viduka 51', 54', 56'; Wright 77'; Burley 84'	BBC Report	Cocard 36'	Stadium: Celtic Park; Attendance: 59,720; Referee: Mike McCurry

7 November 1999 Premier League	Rangers	4–2	Celtic	Glasgow
13:00 GMT	Johansson 19'; Albertz 45' (pen.); Amoruso 49'; Amato 66'	BBC Report	Berkovic 21', 42'	Stadium: Ibrox Stadium; Attendance: 50,026; Referee: Kenny Clark

20 November 1999 Premier League	Hearts	1–2	Celtic	Edinburgh
15:00 GMT	Cameron 3'	Report	Wright 71'; Moravčík 88'	Stadium: Tynecastle Stadium; Attendance: 17,184; Referee: Mike McCurry

28 November 1999 Premier League	Motherwell	3–2	Celtic	Motherwell
18:05 GMT	Brannan 9'; Townsley 44'; Goodman 49'	BBC Report	Berkovic 20'; Viduka 26' (pen.)	Stadium: Fir Park; Attendance: 12,775; Referee: Jim McCluskey

4 December 1999 Premier League	Celtic	4–0	Hibernian	Glasgow
15:00 GMT	Viduka 18' (pen.); Moravčík 29', 58'; Wieghorst 86'	BBC Report		Stadium: Celtic Park; Attendance: 60,092; Referee: Stuart Dougal

11 December 1999 Premier League	Aberdeen	0–6	Celtic	Aberdeen
15:00 GMT		BBC Report	Lambert 21'; Mahé 28'; Moravčík 67'; Viduka 75'; Blinker 81'	Stadium: Pittodrie Stadium; Attendance: 16,532; Referee: Mike McCurry

18 December 1999 Premier League	Celtic	4–1	Dundee United	Glasgow
15:00 GMT	Blinker 47'; Viduka 50'; Moravčík 61'; Burchill 89'	BBC Report	Ferraz 27'	Stadium: Celtic Park; Attendance: 59,120; Referee: Jim McCluskey

27 December 1999 Premier League	Celtic	1–1	Rangers	Glasgow
15:00 GMT	Viduka 18'	BBC Report	Dodds 27'	Stadium: Celtic Park; Attendance: 59,722; Referee: Hugh Dallas

23 January 2000 Premier League	Kilmarnock	1–1	Celtic	Kilmarnock
18:05 GMT	Reilly 40'	BBC Report	Viduka 31'	Stadium: Rugby Park; Attendance: 14,126; Referee: Kenny Clark

5 February 2000 Premier League	Celtic	2–3	Hearts	Glasgow
15:00 GMT	Moravčík 18'; Viduka 28'	BBC Report	Cameron 31', 83' (pen.); Naysmith 55'	Stadium: Celtic Park; Attendance: 59,896; Referee: John Rowbotham

12 February 2000 Premier League	Dundee	0–3	Celtic	Dundee
15:00 GMT		BBC Report	Mjällby 67'; Viduka 69'; Healy 82'	Stadium: Dens Park; Attendance: 10,044; Referee: Bobby Orr

1 March 2000 Premier League	Celtic	6–2	Dundee	Glasgow
19:45 GMT	Johnson 18', 31', 64' (pen.); Viduka 36', 45'; Petrov 43'	BBC Report	Robertson 58'; Grady 77'	Stadium: Celtic Park; Attendance: 56,228; Referee: Stuart Dougal

5 March 2000 Premier League	Hibernian	2–1	Celtic	Edinburgh
18:05 GMT	McGinlay 22'; Miller 63'	BBC Report	Viduka 73'	Stadium: Easter Road; Attendance: 12,236; Referee: Jim McCluskey

8 March 2000 Premier League	Celtic	0–1	Rangers	Glasgow
19:45 GMT		BBC Report	Wallace 86'	Stadium: Celtic Park; Attendance: 59,682; Referee: Jim McCluskey

11 March 2000 Premier League	Celtic	4–1	St Johnstone	Glasgow
15:00 GMT	Burchill 17', 70'; Viduka 65', 68'	BBC Report	Connolly 34'	Stadium: Celtic Park; Attendance: 59,530; Referee: John Rowbotham

26 March 2000 Premier League	Rangers	4–0	Celtic	Glasgow
18:05 GMT	Albertz 4', 84'; Kanchelskis 41' van Bronckhorst 87'	BBC Report		Stadium: Ibrox Stadium; Attendance: 50,039; Referee: Willie Young

2 April 2000 Premier League	Celtic	4–2	Kilmarnock	Glasgow
18:05 GMT	Johnson 10'; Blinker 20'; Berkovic 73'; Burchill 83'	BBC Report	Wright 49'; Lauchlan 50'	Stadium: Celtic Park; Attendance: 40,569; Referee: Mike McCurry

5 April 2000 Premier League	Celtic	4–0	Motherwell	Glasgow
19:45 GMT	Johnson 9', 75'; Berkovic 32'; Blinker 76'	BBC Report		Stadium: Celtic Park; Attendance: 46,682; Referee: Stuart Dougal

8 April 2000 Premier League	Hearts	1–0	Celtic	Edinburgh
15:00 GMT	McSwegan 36'	BBC Report		Stadium: Tynecastle Park; Attendance: 16,046; Referee: Hugh Dallas

15 April 2000 Premier League	Celtic	2–2	Dundee	Glasgow
15:00 GMT	Mahé 30'; Burchill 45'	BBC Report	Luna 1'; Gould 54' (o.g.)	Stadium: Celtic Park; Attendance: 47,163; Referee: Dougal

22 April 2000 Premier League	Celtic	1–1	Hibernian	Glasgow
15:00 GMT	Mahé 79'	Report	Lovell 30'	Stadium: Celtic Park; Attendance: 43,229; Referee: John Rowbotham

29 April 2000 Premier League	Motherwell	1–1	Celtic	Motherwell
15:00 GMT	Brannan 45'	BBC Report	Burchill 15'	Stadium: Fir Park; Attendance: 8,115; Referee: Jim McCluskey

2 May 2000 Premier League	Dundee United	0–1	Celtic	Dundee
19:45 GMT		BBC Report	Burchill 9'	Stadium: Tannadice Park; Attendance: 7,449; Referee: Willie Young

6 May 2000 Premier League	Celtic	5–1	Aberdeen	Glasgow
15:00 GMT	Johnson 25', 50', 53'; Moravčík 34', 43'	BBC Report	Winters 64'	Stadium: Celtic Park; Attendance: 41,786; Referee: Kenny Clark

13 May 2000 Premier League	St Johnstone	0–0	Celtic	Perth
15:00 GMT		BBC Report		Stadium: McDiarmid Park; Attendance: 6,729; Referee: Willie Young

21 May 2000 Premier League	Celtic	2–0	Dundee United	Glasgow
15:00 GMT	Lynch 52'; Burchill 65'	BBC Report		Stadium: Celtic Park; Attendance: 47,586; Referee: Kenny Clark

=== UEFA Cup ===
12 August 1999 Qualifying round 1st leg	Cwmbrân Town (Wales)	0–6	(Scotland) Celtic	Cardiff
19:30 GMT		Report	Berkovic 2'; Tebily 20'; Larsson 32'; Viduka 52'; Larsson 61'; Brattbakk 84'	Stadium: Ninian Park; Attendance: 8,920; Referee: Michael Ross

26 August 1999 Qualifying round 2nd leg	Celtic (Scotland)	4–0 (10 – 0 agg.)	(Wales) Cwmbrân Town	Glasgow
19:45 GMT	Brattbakk 9'; Smith 60'; Mjällby 66'; Johnson 90'	Report		Stadium: Celtic Park; Attendance: 46,957; Referee: Paul McKeon

16 September 1999 First round 1st leg	Celtic (Scotland)	2–0	(Israel) Hapoel Tel Aviv	Glasgow
19:45 GMT	Larsson 25' 50' (pen.)	Report		Stadium: Celtic Park; Attendance: 45,171; Referee: Frank De Bleeckere

30 September 1999 First round 2nd leg	Hapoel Tel Aviv (Israel)	0–1 (0–3 agg.)	(Scotland) Celtic	Tel Aviv
21:00 GMT		Report	Larsson 63'	Stadium: Bloomfield Stadium; Attendance: 6,400; Referee: Juan Manuel Brito Arceo

21 October 1999 Second round 1st leg	Lyon (France)	1–0	(Scotland) Celtic	Lyon
19:15 GMT	Blanc 63'	Report		Stadium: Stade de Gerland; Attendance: 37,500; Referee: René Temmink

4 November 1999 Second round 2nd leg	Celtic (Scotland)	0–1 (0–2 agg.)	(France) Lyon	Glasgow
20:00		Report	Vairelles 17'	Stadium: Celtic Park; Attendance: 54,291; Referee: Georg Vardenne

=== League Cup ===
13 October 1999 Third round	Ayr United	0–4	Celtic	Ayr
19:45 BST		Report	Viduka 59'; Blinker 65'; Mjällby 72'; Petta 88'	Stadium: Somerset Park; Attendance: 8,421; Referee: John Rowbotham

1 December 1999 Quarter-final	Celtic	1–0	Dundee	Glasgow
19:45 BST	Wieghorst 90+3'	Report		Stadium: Celtic Park; Attendance: 40,260; Referee: Hugh Dallas

16 February 2000 Semi-final	Celtic	1–0	Kilmarnock	Glasgow
19:45 BST	Moravčík 66'	BBC Report		Stadium: Hampden Park; Attendance: 22,296; Referee: Jim McClusky

19 March 2000 Final	Celtic	2–0	Aberdeen	Glasgow
15:00 BST	Riseth 15'; Johnson 58'	BBC Report		Stadium: Hampden Park; Attendance: 50,073; Referee: Kenny Clark

=== Scottish Cup ===
8 February 2000 Third round	Celtic	1–3	Inverness Caledonian Thistle	Glasgow
19:45 GMT	Burchill 17'	BBC Report	Wilson 16'; Moravčík 24' (o.g.); Sheerin 57'	Stadium: Celtic Park; Attendance: 34,389; Referee: Dougie McDonald

== Squad ==
Note: Flags indicate national team as defined under FIFA eligibility rules; some limited exceptions apply. Players may hold more than one non-FIFA nationality.

No.	Pos.	Nation	Player
1	GK	SCO	Jonathan Gould
2	DF	SCO	Tom Boyd
3	DF	FRA	Stéphane Mahé
4	DF	SCO	Jackie McNamara
5	DF	DEN	Marc Rieper
6	DF	ENG	Alan Stubbs
7	FW	SWE	Henrik Larsson
9	FW	NOR	Harald Brattbakk
10	MF	ISR	Eyal Berkovic
11	DF	DEN	Morten Wieghorst
12	FW	ENG	Tommy Johnson
14	MF	SCO	Paul Lambert
15	MF	NED	Bobby Petta
16	DF	CIV	Olivier Tébily
17	FW	ENG	Ian Wright
19	MF	BUL	Stiliyan Petrov
20	MF	NED	Regi Blinker
21	GK	SCO	Stewart Kerr
22	MF	FRA	Stephane Bonnes
23	GK	RUS	Dmitri Kharine
24	MF	IRL	Colin Healy

No.	Pos.	Nation	Player
25	MF	SVK	Ľubomír Moravčík
26	FW	SCO	Paul Shields
27	FW	SCO	Mark Burchill
28	MF	SCO	Ryan McCann
29	MF	VEN	Fernando de Ornelas
30	MF	NOR	Vidar Riseth
31	DF	BRA	Rafael Scheidt
32	FW	SCO	Simon Lynch
33	DF	NIR	John Convery
34	MF	SCO	Mark Fotheringham
35	DF	SWE	Johan Mjällby
36	FW	AUS	Mark Viduka
37	MF	SCO	Liam Keogh
38	GK	SCO	Barry John Corr
39	MF	SCO	Jamie Smith
40	DF	SCO	Stephen Crainey
41	DF	SCO	John Kennedy
42	MF	IRL	Jim Goodwin
43	MF	IRL	Liam Miller
46	MF	SCO	Brian McColligan

== Statistics ==
=== League table ===
Pos	Team	Pld	W	D	L	GF	GA	GD	Pts	Qualification or relegation
1	Rangers (C)	36	28	6	2	96	26	+70	90	Qualification for the Champions League second qualifying round
2	Celtic	36	21	6	9	90	38	+52	69	Qualification for the UEFA Cup qualifying round
3	Heart of Midlothian	36	15	9	12	47	40	+7	54	Qualification for the UEFA Cup qualifying round
4	Motherwell	36	14	10	12	49	63	−14	52	
5	St Johnstone	36	10	12	14	36	44	−8	42	

Updated to match(es) played on end of season. Source: Scottish Professional Football League
Rules for classification: 1) Points; 2) Goal difference; 3) Goals scored
(C) Champions

== See also ==
- List of Celtic F.C. seasons
