= 2001–02 Celtic F.C. season =

Celtic
2001–02 season
- Chairman: Brian Quinn
- Manager: Martin O'Neill
- Stadium: Celtic Park
- Scottish Premier League: 1st
- Scottish Cup: Runners-up
- Scottish League Cup: Semi-finals
- Champions League: Group stage
- UEFA Cup: Third round
- Top goalscorer: League: Henrik Larsson (29); All: Henrik Larsson (35)
| Home colours | Away colours | Third colours |

Celtic started the 2001–02 season looking to retain the Scottish Premier League, Scottish League Cup and the Scottish Cup. They entered the UEFA Champions League at the third qualifying round. They finished the season as league champions for the second season in succession.

== Players ==
Squad at end of season

Note: Flags indicate national team as defined under FIFA eligibility rules; some limited exceptions apply. Players may hold more than one non-FIFA nationality.

| No. | Pos. | Nation | Player |
|---|---|---|---|
| 1 | GK | SCO | Jonathan Gould |
| 2 | DF | SCO | Tom Boyd |
| 3 | DF | GUI | Mohammed Sylla |
| 4 | DF | SCO | Jackie McNamara |
| 5 | DF | BEL | Joos Valgaeren |
| 6 | DF | GUI | Bobo Baldé |
| 7 | FW | SWE | Henrik Larsson |
| 8 | MF | ENG | Alan Thompson |
| 9 | FW | ENG | Chris Sutton |
| 10 | FW | WAL | John Hartson |
| 11 | MF | DEN | Morten Wieghorst |
| 14 | MF | SCO | Paul Lambert |
| 15 | MF | NED | Bobby Petta |
| 17 | DF | FRA | Didier Agathe |
| 18 | MF | NIR | Neil Lennon |
| 19 | MF | BUL | Stiliyan Petrov |

| No. | Pos. | Nation | Player |
|---|---|---|---|
| 20 | GK | SCO | Rab Douglas |
| 23 | GK | RUS | Dmitri Kharine |
| 24 | MF | IRL | Colin Healy |
| 25 | DF | SVK | Ľubomír Moravčík |
| 29 | FW | SCO | Shaun Maloney |
| 30 | MF | ENG | Steve Guppy |
| 31 | DF | BRA | Rafael Scheidt |
| 32 | FW | SCO | Simon Lynch |
| 34 | MF | SCO | Mark Fotheringham |
| 35 | DF | SWE | Johan Mjällby |
| 37 | FW | SCO | Liam Keogh |
| 39 | MF | SCO | Jamie Smith |
| 40 | DF | SCO | Stephen Crainey |
| 41 | DF | SCO | John Kennedy |
| 42 | DF | IRL | Jim Goodwin |
| 43 | MF | IRL | Liam Miller |

== Reserve squad ==
Note: Flags indicate national team as defined under FIFA eligibility rules; some limited exceptions apply. Players may hold more than one non-FIFA nationality.

| No. | Pos. | Nation | Player |
|---|---|---|---|
| 22 | MF | FRA | Stéphane Bonnes |
| 26 | FW | SCO | Paul Shields |
| 27 | MF | SCO | Jon-Paul McGovern |

| No. | Pos. | Nation | Player |
|---|---|---|---|
| 28 | MF | SCO | Ryan McCann |
| 38 | GK | SCO | Barry-John Corr |
| 46 | MF | SCO | Brian McColligan |

== Competitions ==
=== Pre-season and Friendlies ===
| 6 July 2001 Friendly | Cork City | 2–3 | Celtic | Cork, Ireland |
| | Mulligan 42'; Flanagan 63' | | McNamara 45+3'; Burchill 62', 80' | Stadium: Turners Cross; Referee: Alan Kelly |

| 8 July 2001 Friendly | Shelbourne | 1–3 | Celtic | Dublin, Ireland |
| | Byrne 53' | | McNamara 52'; Doyle 74'; Johnson 77' | Stadium: Tolka Park; Referee: Paul McKeown |

| 14 July 2001 Friendly | Queens Park Rangers | 0–2 | Celtic | London, England |
| | | BBC Sport | Larsson 1'; Moravčík 75' | Stadium: Loftus Road; Attendance: 17,337 |

| 17 July 2001 Friendly | Porto | 1–0 | Celtic | Paris, France |
| | Capucho 87' | | | Stadium: Stade Charléty |

| 20 July 2001 Friendly | Celtic | 3–0 | Fulham | Glasgow |
| | Larsson 19', 59'; Maloney 85' | | | Stadium: Celtic Park; Attendance: 40,000; Referee: John Rowbotham |

| 24 July 2001 Friendly | Celtic | 1–0 | Sunderland | Glasgow |
| | Larsson 68' (pen.) | BBC Sport | | Stadium: Celtic Park; Referee: Willie Young |

| 1 August 2001 Ryan Giggs Testimonial | Manchester United | 3–4 | Celtic | Manchester, England |
| | van Nistelrooy 24', 84'; Verón 64' | BBC Sport | Sutton 2'; Lennon 3'; Lambert 27'; Moravčík 67' | Stadium: Old Trafford; Attendance: 66,957 |

| 8 April 2002 Friendly | Leicester City | 0–1 | Celtic | Leicester, England |
| | | | Hartson 10' | Stadium: Filbert Street; Referee: Peter Jones |

| 7 May 2002 Gary Kelly Testimonial | Leeds United | 1–4 | Celtic | Leeds, England |
| | Bowyer 28' | | Thompson 21'; Larsson 25'; Hartson 56'; Maloney 62' | Stadium: Elland Road; Attendance: 26,440; Referee: Dermot Gallagher |

| 13 May 2002 Tony Adams Testimonial | Arsenal | 1–1 | Celtic | London, England |
| | Dixon 67' | BBC Sport | Thompson 33' | Stadium: Highbury; Attendance: 38,000; Referee: Dermot Gallagher |

=== Scottish Premier League ===
| 28 July 2001 | Celtic | 3–0 | St Johnstone | Glasgow |
| | Mjällby 37'; Lambert 64', 72' | BBC Sport | | Stadium: Celtic Park; Attendance: 58,005; Referee: Mike McCurry |

| 4 August 2001 | Kilmarnock | 0–1 | Celtic | Kilmarnock |
| | | | Larsson 76' | Stadium: Rugby Park; Attendance: 13,201; Referee: Stuart Dougal |

| 11 August 2001 | Celtic | 2–0 | Heart of Midlothian | Glasgow |
| | Larsson 45', 64' | | | Stadium: Celtic Park; Attendance: 58,423; Referee: Willie Young |

| 18 August 2001 | Livingston | 0–0 | Celtic | Livingston |
| | | | | Stadium: Almondvale Stadium; Attendance: 10,024; Referee: Hugh Dallas |

| 25 August 2001 | Hibernian | 1–4 | Celtic | Edinburgh |
| | Fenwick 85' | | Moravčík 16'; Sutton 17', 20'; Larsson 31' | Stadium: Easter Road; Attendance: 14,701; Referee: Kenny Clark |

| 8 September 2001 | Celtic | 3–1 | Dunfermline Athletic | Glasgow |
| | Moravčík 9', 70'; Sutton 45+3' | | Crawford 85' | Stadium: Celtic Park; Attendance: 57,956; Referee: John Underhill |

| 15 September 2001 | Dundee | 0–4 | Celtic | Dundee |
| | | BBC Sport | Larsson 45', 59'; Petrov 70'; Maloney 88' | Stadium: Dens Park; Attendance: 9,842; Referee: Alan Freeland |

| 22 September 2001 | Celtic | 2–0 | Aberdeen | Glasgow |
| | Larsson 65'; Petrov 81' | BBC Sport | | Stadium: Celtic Park; Attendance: 59,197; Referee: Mike McCurry |

| 30 September 2001 | Rangers | 0–2 | Celtic | Glasgow |
| | | BBC Sport | Petrov 14'; Thompson 90+2' | Stadium: Ibrox Stadium; Attendance: 50,097; Referee: Kenny Clark |

| 13 October 2001 | Motherwell | 1–2 | Celtic | Motherwell |
| | Strong 68' | BBC Sport | Moravčík 14'; Larsson 88' (pen.) | Stadium: Fir Park; Attendance: 9,922; Referee: John Rowbotham |

| 20 October 2001 | Celtic | 5–1 | Dundee United | Glasgow |
| | Hartson 7', 60', 83'; Baldé 45+1'; Maloney 86' | BBC Sport | McIntyre 76' | Stadium: Celtic Park; Attendance: 59,900; Referee: Bobby Orr |

| 27 October 2001 | Celtic | 1–0 | Kilmarnock | Glasgow |
| | Valgaeren 90+2' | BBC Sport | | Stadium: Celtic Park; Attendance: 58,897; Referee: David Somers |

| 3 November 2001 | St Johnstone | 1–2 | Celtic | Perth |
| | Dods 26' | BBC Sport | Dods 20' (o.g.); Larsson 90+1' | Stadium: McDiarmid Park; Attendance: 9,041; Referee: Douglas McDonald |

| 17 November 2001 | Heart of Midlothian | 0–1 | Celtic | Edinburgh |
| | | BBC Sport | Larsson 44' (pen.) | Stadium: Tynecastle Stadium; Attendance: 15,570; Referee: Mike McCurry |

| 25 November 2001 | Celtic | 2–1 | Rangers | Glasgow |
| | Valgaeren 58'; Larsson 70' (pen.) | BBC Sport | Løvenkrands 77' | Stadium: Celtic Park; Attendance: 59,609; Referee: Stuart Dougal |

| 1 December 2001 | Celtic | 3–0 | Hibernian | Glasgow |
| | Hartson 11', 40'; Lennon 72' | BBC Sport | | Stadium: Celtic Park; Attendance: 59,415; Referee: Willie Young |

| 8 December 2001 | Dunfermline Athletic | 0–4 | Celtic | Dunfermline |
| | | BBC Sport | Baldé 8'; Hartson 20', 60'; Thompson 62' | Stadium: East End Park; Attendance: 8,207; Referee: Alan Freeland |

| 15 December 2001 | Celtic | 3–1 | Dundee | Glasgow |
| | Sutton 50'; Larsson 56'; Hartson 65' | BBC Sport | Zhiyi 19' | Stadium: Celtic Park; Attendance: 57,198; Referee: John Rowbotham |

| 22 December 2001 | Aberdeen | 2–0 | Celtic | Aberdeen |
| | Winters 59' (pen.); Mackie 90+1' | BBC Sport | | Stadium: Pittodrie Stadium; Attendance: 18,160; Referee: Stuart Dougal |

| 26 December 2001 | Celtic | 3–2 | Livingston | Glasgow |
| | Moravčík 12'; Larsson 50', 90+2' | BBC Sport | Rubio 37'; Quino 58' | Stadium: Celtic Park; Attendance: 58,507; Referee: Gary Mitchell |

| 29 December 2001 | Dundee United | 0–4 | Celtic | Dundee |
| | | BBC Sport | Hartson 4'; Petrov 27'; Thompson 47'; Larsson 71' | Stadium: Tannadice Park; Attendance: 12,165; Referee: John Rowbotham |

| 2 January 2002 | Celtic | 2–0 | Motherwell | Glasgow |
| | Larsson 81'; Hartson 90+3' | BBC Sport | | Stadium: Celtic Park; Attendance: 57,648; Referee: Alan Freeland |

| 11 January 2002 | Kilmarnock | 0–2 | Celtic | Kilmarnock |
| | | BBC Sport | Hartson 51' (pen.); Lambert 61' | Stadium: Rugby Park; Attendance: 11,689; Referee: John Underhill |

| 19 January 2002 | Celtic | 2–1 | St Johnstone | Glasgow |
| | Larsson 8'; Thompson 10' | BBC Sport | Dods 6' | Stadium: Celtic Park; Attendance: 58,547; Referee: Kevin Toner |

| 23 January 2002 | Celtic | 2–0 | Heart of Midlothian | Glasgow |
| | Larsson 80', 86' | BBC Sport | | Stadium: Celtic Park; Attendance: 57,203; Referee: Bobby Orr |

| 30 January 2002 | Livingston | 1–3 | Celtic | Livingston |
| | Quino 4' | BBC Sport | Larsson 60'; Moravčík 68'; Hartson 72' | Stadium: Almondvale Stadium; Attendance: 8,437; Referee: Douglas McDonald |

| 2 February 2002 | Hibernian | 1–1 | Celtic | Edinburgh |
| | O'Connor 22' | BBC Sport | Hartson 50' | Stadium: Easter Road; Attendance: 12,313; Referee: Alan Freeland |

| 9 February 2002 | Celtic | 5–0 | Dunfermline Athletic | Glasgow |
| | Larsson 12', 32', 43'; Hartson 37'; Agathe 74' | BBC Sport | | Stadium: Celtic Park; Attendance: 58,590; Referee: John Rowbotham |

| 17 February 2002 | Dundee | 0–3 | Celtic | Dundee |
| | | BBC Sport | Larsson 20'; Mjällby 43'; Hartson 71' | Stadium: Dens Park; Attendance: 10,642; Referee: Mike McCurry |

| 2 March 2002 | Celtic | 1–0 | Aberdeen | Glasgow |
| | Thompson 45+3' (pen.) | BBC Sport | | Stadium: Celtic Park; Attendance: 59,564; Referee: John Underhill |

| 10 March 2002 | Rangers | 1–1 | Celtic | Glasgow |
| | Numan 59' | BBC Sport | Petrov 23' | Stadium: Ibrox Stadium; Attendance: 49,765; Referee: Hugh Dallas |

| 15 March 2002 | Celtic | 1–0 | Dundee United | Glasgow |
| | Petrov 41' | BBC Sport | | Stadium: Celtic Park; Attendance: 58,392; Referee: Mike McCurry |

| 19 March 2002 | Motherwell | 0–4 | Celtic | Motherwell |
| | | BBC Sport | Lambert 10'; Larsson 53', 60' (pen.); Mjällby 43' | Stadium: Fir Park; Attendance: 10,134; Referee: Stuart Dougal |

| 6 April 2002 | Celtic | 5–1 | Livingston | Glasgow |
| | Larsson 3', 33', 59'; Hartson 19', 25' | BBC Sport | Wilson 72' | Stadium: Celtic Park; Attendance: 59,752; Referee: Willie Young |

| 12 April 2002 | Celtic | 5–0 | Dunfermline Athletic | Glasgow |
| | Hartson 18', 70'; Lambert 40'; Smith 58'; Sylla 76' | BBC Sport | | Stadium: Celtic Park; Attendance: 57,016; Referee: John Underhill |

| 21 April 2002 | Celtic | 1–1 | Rangers | Glasgow |
| | Thompson 43' | BBC Sport | Løvenkrands 1' | Stadium: Celtic Park; Attendance: 59,384; Referee: Kenny Clark |

| 26 April 2002 | Heart of Midlothian | 1–4 | Celtic | Edinburgh |
| | Fuller 31' | BBC Sport | Lynch 12', 40'; Maloney 50', 66' | Stadium: Tynecastle Stadium; Attendance: 12,391; Referee: John Rowbotham |

| 12 May 2002 | Aberdeen | 0–1 | Celtic | Aberdeen |
| | | BBC Sport | Maloney 69' | Stadium: Pittodrie Stadium; Attendance: 15,332; Referee: Stuart Dougal |

=== Scottish League Cup ===
| 6 November 2001 Third Round | Celtic | 8–0 | Stirling Albion | Glasgow |
| | Hartson 22', 74'; Maloney 28', 41', 53', 68'; Tebily 72'; Healy 78' | BBC Sport | | Stadium: Celtic Park; Attendance: 29,933; Referee: Stuart Dougal |

| 18 December 2001 Quarter-Final | Livingston | 0–2 | Celtic | Livingston |
| | | | Baldé 36'; Hartson 85' | Stadium: Almondvale Stadium; Attendance: 9,146; Referee: Kenny Clark |

| 5 February 2002 Semi-Final | Rangers | 2–1 (a.e.t.) | Celtic | Glasgow |
| | Løvenkrands 45+3'; Konterman 105' | BBC Sport | Baldé 73' | Stadium: Hampden Park; Attendance: 43,457; Referee: Kenny Clark |

=== Scottish Cup ===
| 8 January 2002 Third Round | Alloa Athletic | 0–5 | Celtic | Falkirk |
| | | BBC Sport | Baldé 20'; Wieghorst 42'; Maloney 56'; Petta 75'; Sylla 80' | Stadium: Brockville Park; Attendance: 5,498; Referee: Stuart Dougal |

| 26 January 2002 Fourth Round | Kilmarnock | 0–2 | Celtic | Kilmarnock |
| | | | Hay 53' (o.g.); Larsson 63' | Stadium: Rugby Park; Attendance: 11,269; Referee: Hugh Dallas |

| 25 February 2002 Quarter-Final | Aberdeen | 0–2 | Celtic | Aberdeen |
| | | BBC Sport | Hartson 6'; Petrov 53' | Stadium: Pittodrie Stadium; Attendance: 17,082; Referee: Hugh Dallas |

| 23 March 2002 Semi-Final | Celtic | 3–0 | Ayr United | Glasgow |
| | Larsson 49'; Thompson 81', 88' | BBC Sport | | Stadium: Hampden Park; Attendance: 26,774; Referee: Stuart Dougal |

| 4 May 2002 Final | Celtic | 2–3 | Rangers | Glasgow |
| | Hartson 19'; Baldé 50' | BBC Sport | Løvenkrands 21', 90+4'; Ferguson 69' | Stadium: Hampden Park; Attendance: 51,138; Referee: Hugh Dallas |

=== UEFA Champions League ===
| 8 August 2001 Third Qualifying Round | Ajax (Netherlands) | 1–3 | (Scotland) Celtic | Amsterdam, Netherlands |
| 20:30 CET | Arveladze 40' | Report | Petta 7'; Agathe 19'; Sutton 55' | Stadium: Amsterdam ArenA; Attendance: 51,324; Referee: Antonio López Nieto (Spain) |

| 22 August 2001 Third Qualifying Round | Celtic (Scotland) | 0–1 (3–2 agg.) | (Netherlands) Ajax | Glasgow |
| 20:45 CET | | Report | Wamberto 30' | Stadium: Celtic Park; Attendance: 58,575; Referee: Stefano Braschi (Italy) |

| 18 September 2001 Group Stage | Juventus (Italy) | 3–2 | (Scotland) Celtic | Turin, Italy |
| | Trezeguet 43', 55'; Amoruso 90' (pen.) | BBC Sport | Petrov 67'; Larsson 86' (pen.) | Stadium: Stadio Delle Alpi; Attendance: 43,017; Referee: Hellmut Krug (Germany) |

| 25 September 2001 Group Stage | Celtic (Scotland) | 1–0 | (Portugal) Porto | Glasgow |
| | Larsson 36' | | | Stadium: Celtic Park; Attendance: 54,650; Referee: Dick Jol (Netherlands) |

| 10 October 2001 Group Stage | Celtic (Scotland) | 1–0 | (Norway) Rosenborg | Glasgow |
| | Thompson 21' | BBC Sport | | Stadium: Celtic Park; Attendance: 57,233; Referee: Alain Sars (France) |

| 17 October 2001 Group Stage | Porto (Portugal) | 3–0 | (Scotland) Celtic | Porto, Portugal |
| | Clayton 1', 61'; Silva 45+1' | | | Stadium: Estádio das Antas; Attendance: 30,313; Referee: René Temmink (Netherlands) |

| 23 October 2001 Group Stage | Rosenborg (Norway) | 2–0 | (Scotland) Celtic | Trondheim, Norway |
| | Brattbakk 19', 36' | BBC Sport | | Stadium: Lerkendal Stadion; Attendance: 21,540; Referee: Juan Fernández Marin (Spain) |

| 31 October 2001 Group Stage | Celtic (Scotland) | 4–3 | (Italy) Juventus | Glasgow |
| | Valgaeren 24'; Sutton 45', 64'; Larsson 57' (pen.) | BBC Sport | Del Piero 19'; Trezeguet 51', 77' | Stadium: Celtic Park; Attendance: 57,717; Referee: Gilles Veissière (France) |

=== UEFA Cup ===
| 22 November 2001 Third Round | Valencia (Spain) | 1–0 | (Scotland) Celtic | Valencia, Spain |
| | Vicente 74' | Report | | Stadium: Mestalla Stadium; Attendance: 31,204; Referee: Domenico Messina (Italy) |

| 6 December 2001 Third Round | Celtic (Scotland) | 1–0 (a.e.t.) (1–1 agg.) (4–5 p) | (Spain) Valencia | Glasgow |
| | Larsson 45+4' | Report | | Stadium: Celtic Park; Attendance: 57,299; Referee: Knud Erik Fisker (Denmark) |
| | Penalties |
| | Lambert (penalty scored); Thompson (penalty scored); Larsson (penalty missed); Petrov (penalty missed); Sutton (penalty scored); Hartson (penalty scored); Valgaeren (penalty missed) | | (penalty scored) Carew; (penalty missed) Vicente; (penalty scored) de los Santos; (penalty scored) Sánchez; (penalty missed) Ayala; (penalty scored) Pellegrino; (penalty scored) Mista |

== Player statistics ==
=== Appearances and goals ===
List of squad players, including number of appearances by competition

| No. | Pos | Nat | Player | Total | | Premier League | | Scottish Cup | | League Cup | | Europe | |
| No. | Pos | Nat | Player | Apps | Goals | Apps | Goals | Apps | Goals | Apps | Goals | Apps | Goals |
|---|---|---|---|---|---|---|---|---|---|---|---|---|---|
| 1 | GK | (Scotland) SCO | Jonathan Gould | 3 | 0 | 1 | 0 | 1 | 0 | 0+1 | 0 | 0 | 0 |
| 2 | DF | (Scotland) SCO | Tom Boyd | 12 | 0 | 9 | 0 | 1 | 0 | 0 | 0 | 2 | 0 |
| 3 | MF | (Guinea) GUI | Mohammed Sylla | 15 | 2 | 7+2 | 1 | 1+1 | 1 | 1 | 0 | 0+3 | 0 |
| 4 | DF | (Scotland) SCO | Jackie McNamara | 30 | 0 | 9+11 | 0 | 2+2 | 0 | 2 | 0 | 3+1 | 0 |
| 5 | DF | (Belgium) BEL | Joos Valgaeren | 32 | 3 | 20 | 2 | 1 | 0 | 2 | 0 | 9 | 1 |
| 6 | DF | (Guinea) GUI | Bobo Baldé | 38 | 6 | 22 | 2 | 5 | 2 | 3 | 2 | 8 | 0 |
| 7 | FW | (Sweden) SWE | Henrik Larsson | 47 | 35 | 33 | 29 | 3 | 2 | 1 | 0 | 10 | 4 |
| 8 | MF | (England) ENG | Alan Thompson | 36 | 9 | 22+3 | 6 | 3+1 | 2 | 1 | 0 | 4+2 | 1 |
| 9 | FW | (England) ENG | Chris Sutton | 30 | 7 | 18 | 4 | 2 | 0 | 1+1 | 0 | 8 | 3 |
| 10 | FW | (Wales) WAL | John Hartson | 43 | 24 | 26+5 | 19 | 4 | 2 | 3 | 3 | 2+3 | 0 |
| 11 | MF | (Denmark) DEN | Morten Wieghorst | 5 | 1 | 2+1 | 0 | 1 | 1 | 1 | 0 | 0 | 0 |
| 14 | MF | (Scotland) SCO | Paul Lambert | 49 | 5 | 33+1 | 5 | 4 | 0 | 1 | 0 | 10 | 0 |
| 15 | MF | (Netherlands) NED | Bobby Petta | 27 | 2 | 12+6 | 0 | 1+1 | 1 | 0+1 | 0 | 4+2 | 1 |
| 16 | DF | (Ivory Coast) CIV | Olivier Tébily | 13 | 1 | 8+3 | 0 | 1 | 0 | 1 | 1 | 0 | 0 |
| 17 | MF | (France) FRA | Didier Agathe | 32 | 2 | 20 | 1 | 3 | 0 | 1 | 0 | 8 | 1 |
| 18 | MF | (Northern Ireland) NIR | Neil Lennon | 49 | 1 | 32+1 | 1 | 4 | 0 | 1+1 | 0 | 10 | 0 |
| 19 | MF | (Bulgaria) BUL | Stiliyan Petrov | 44 | 8 | 26+2 | 6 | 5 | 1 | 2+1 | 0 | 7+1 | 1 |
| 20 | GK | (Scotland) SCO | Rab Douglas | 52 | 0 | 35 | 0 | 4 | 0 | 3 | 0 | 10 | 0 |
| 23 | GK | (Russia) RUS | Dmitri Kharine | 4 | 0 | 2+1 | 0 | 0 | 0 | 1 | 0 | 0 | 0 |
| 24 | MF | (Republic of Ireland) IRL | Colin Healy | 6 | 1 | 2+2 | 0 | 0+1 | 0 | 1 | 1 | 0 | 0 |
| 25 | MF | (Slovakia) SVK | Ľubomír Moravčík | 33 | 6 | 16+7 | 6 | 1 | 0 | 2+1 | 0 | 3+3 | 0 |
| 27 | MF | (Scotland) SCO | Jon-Paul McGovern | 0 | 0 | 0 | 0 | 0 | 0 | 0 | 0 | 0 | 0 |
| 29 | FW | (Scotland) SCO | Shaun Maloney | 20 | 10 | 3+13 | 5 | 1+1 | 1 | 1 | 4 | 0+1 | 0 |
| 30 | MF | (England) ENG | Steve Guppy | 23 | 0 | 16 | 0 | 2 | 0 | 2 | 0 | 3 | 0 |
| 32 | FW | (Scotland) SCO | Simon Lynch | 1 | 2 | 1 | 2 | 0 | 0 | 0 | 0 | 0 | 0 |
| 33 | MF | (Scotland) SCO | Ross Wallace | 0 | 0 | 0 | 0 | 0 | 0 | 0 | 0 | 0 | 0 |
| 34 | MF | (Scotland) SCO | Mark Fotheringham | 0 | 0 | 0 | 0 | 0 | 0 | 0 | 0 | 0 | 0 |
| 35 | DF | (Sweden) SWE | Johan Mjällby | 51 | 3 | 35 | 3 | 4 | 0 | 2 | 0 | 10 | 0 |
| 39 | MF | (Scotland) SCO | Jamie Smith | 13 | 1 | 3+8 | 1 | 0+1 | 0 | 0+1 | 0 | 0 | 0 |
| 40 | DF | (Scotland) SCO | Stephen Crainey | 19 | 0 | 10+5 | 0 | 1+1 | 0 | 1 | 0 | 1 | 0 |
| 41 | DF | (Scotland) SCO | John Kennedy | 1 | 0 | 1 | 0 | 0 | 0 | 0 | 0 | 0 | 0 |

NB: Players with a zero in every column only appeared as unused substitutes

== Team statistics ==
=== League table ===
| Pos | Team | Pld | W | D | L | GF | GA | GD | Pts | Qualification or relegation (Note: Teams played each other three times (33 matches), before the league split into two groups (the top six and the bottom six) for the last five matches.) |
|---|---|---|---|---|---|---|---|---|---|---|
| 1 | Celtic (C) | 38 | 33 | 4 | 1 | 94 | 18 | +76 | 103 | Qualification for the Champions League third qualifying round |
| 2 | Rangers | 38 | 25 | 10 | 3 | 82 | 27 | +55 | 85 | Qualification for the UEFA Cup first round |
| 3 | Livingston | 38 | 16 | 10 | 12 | 50 | 47 | +3 | 58 | Qualification for the UEFA Cup qualifying round (Note: As both finalists of the 2001–02 Scottish Cup, Rangers and Celtic, qualified for European competition via their league position, the cup berth for 2002–03 UEFA Cup was passed to the next-placed team in the league, fourth-placed Aberdeen.) |
| 4 | Aberdeen | 38 | 16 | 7 | 15 | 51 | 49 | +2 | 55 | Qualification for the UEFA Cup qualifying round |
| 5 | Heart of Midlothian | 38 | 14 | 6 | 18 | 52 | 57 | −5 | 48 | |

Source: Scottish Professional Football League
Rules for classification: (1) Points; (2) Goal difference; (3) Goals scored
(C) Champions

== Transfers ==
=== In ===
| Date | Player | From | Fee |
|---|---|---|---|
| 20 July 2001 | (Guinea) Dianbobo Balde | (France) Toulouse | £1,000,000 |
| 2 August 2001 | (Wales) John Hartson | (England) Coventry City | £6,500,000 |
| 2 August 2001 | (England) Steve Guppy | (England) Leicester City | £700,000 |
| 2 August 2001 | (Guinea) Mohammed Sylla | (Scotland) St Johnstone | £700,000 |
| 27 August 2001 | (France) Michael Herbert | (France) Paris Saint-Germain | Free |

=== Out ===
| Date | Player | From | Fee |
|---|---|---|---|
| 5 July 2001 | (England) Alan Stubbs | (England) Everton | Free |
| 25 July 2001 | (Israel) Eyal Berkovic | (England) Manchester City | £1,500,000 |
| 1 August 2001 | (France) Stéphane Mahé | (Scotland) Heart of Midlothian | Free |
| 2 August 2001 | (England) Tommy Johnson | (England) Sheffield Wednesday | Free |
| 24 August 2001 | (Scotland) Mark Burchill | (England) Portsmouth | £600,000 |
| 24 August 2001 | (Scotland) Stewart Kerr | (England) Wigan Athletic | £250,000 |
| 22 March 2002 | (Ivory Coast) Olivier Tébily | (England) Birmingham City | £700,000 |

- Expenditure: ▼£8,900,000
- Income: ▲£3,050,000
- Total loss/gain: ▼£5,850,000

== See also ==
- List of Celtic F.C. seasons
