= 1992–93 Feyenoord season =

Feyenoord
1992-93 season
- Chairman: Jorien van den Herik
- Manager: Willem van Hanegem
- Stadium: De Kuip
- Eredivisie: 1st
- KNVB Cup: Semi-finals
- Cup Winners' Cup: Quarter-finals
- Dutch Supercup: Runners-up
- Top goalscorer: League: József Kiprich (18 goals); All: József Kiprich (24 goals)

During the 1992–93 season, Feyenoord participated in the Eredivisie, the KNVB Cup, the Dutch Supercup and the European Cup Winners' Cup.

== Squad ==
Note: Flags indicate national team as defined under FIFA eligibility rules; some limited exceptions apply. Players may hold more than one non-FIFA nationality.

No.	Pos.	Nation	Player
—	GK	NED	Rob van Dijk
—	GK	NED	Ed de Goey
—	GK	NED	Harald Wapenaar
—	DF	NED	Henk Fraser
—	DF	NED	Ulrich van Gobbel
—	DF	NED	Ruud Heus
—	DF	NED	John Metgod
—	DF	NED	Paul Nortan
—	DF	NED	Remco Schol
—	DF	NED	John de Wolf
—	MF	NED	Peter Bosz
—	MF	NED	Regi Blinker
—	MF	NED	Dean Gorré

No.	Pos.	Nation	Player
—	MF	NED	Bobby Petta
—	MF	NED	Arnold Scholten
—	MF	NED	Alfred Schreuder
—	MF	NED	Orlando Trustfull
—	MF	NED	Rob Witschge
—	FW	ISL	Arnar Gunnlaugsson
—	FW	ISL	Bjarki Gunnlaugsson
—	FW	NED	Lloyd Kammeron
—	FW	HUN	József Kiprich
—	FW	NED	John van Loen
—	FW	NGA	Mike Obiku
—	FW	NED	Marchanno Schultz
—	FW	NED	Gaston Taument

== Competitions ==
=== Dutch Supercup ===
12 August 1992 Final	PSV Eindhoven	1-0	Feyenoord	Rotterdam
20:15	Koeman 25'			Stadium: De Kuip; Attendance: 32,650; Referee: Mario van der Ende

=== Eredivisie ===
==== League table ====
Pos	Team	Pld	W	D	L	GF	GA	GD	Pts	Qualification or relegation
1	Feyenoord (C)	34	22	9	3	82	32	+50	53	Qualification to Champions League first round
2	PSV	34	22	7	5	81	34	+47	51	Qualification to UEFA Cup first round
3	Ajax (Note: Winners of the KNVB Cup)	34	20	9	5	87	30	+57	49	Qualification to Cup Winners' Cup first round
4	Vitesse Arnhem	34	16	14	4	58	29	+29	46	Qualification to UEFA Cup first round
5	FC Twente	34	17	8	9	64	39	+25	42	Qualification to UEFA Cup first round

Source: rsssf.com
(C) Champions

=== KNVB Cup ===
28 October 1992 Third round	Feyenoord	7-0	Go Ahead Eagles	Rotterdam
	Metgod 31'; Gorré 39', 51'; Blinker 49'; Kiprich 57', 69' (pen.); Taument 74'			Stadium: De Kuip; Attendance: 6,831; Referee: Jef van Vliet

2 December 1992 Round of 16	Feyenoord	3-1	TOP Oss	Rotterdam
	Taument 6'; Dean Gorré 40', 51'		Robert van der Weert 75'	Stadium: De Kuip; Attendance: 6,000; Referee: Ton Lammers

10 March 1993 Quarter-finals	FC Zwolle	1-1 (1-4 p)	Feyenoord	Zwolle
	Hansma 9'		Van Loen 83'	Stadium: Oosterenkstadion; Attendance: 12,500; Referee: Dick Jol
	Penalties
	Stam (penalty missed); Duim (penalty missed); Henk Loonstra (penalty scored)		Witschge (penalty scored); De Wolf (penalty scored); Heus (penalty scored); Blinker (penalty scored)

31 March 1993 Semi-finals	Feyenoord	0-5	Ajax	Rotterdam
			Davids 43', 58', 90'; Bergkamp 45', 84'	Stadium: De Kuip; Referee: John Blankenstein

=== Cup Winners' Cup ===
==== First round ====
Sep 16, 1992 First leg	Feyenoord (Netherlands)	1-0	(Israel) Hapoel Petah Tikva	De Kuip, Rotterdam
	Kiprich 89'			Attendance: 19,359; Referee: Ernest Kesseler (Luxembourg)

Sep 30, 1992 Second leg	Hapoel Petah Tikva (Israel)	2-1 (2-2 agg.)	(Netherlands) Feyenoord	Ramat Gan, Tel Aviv
	Levin 3'; Moti Kakoon 49'		Henk Fraser 69'	Attendance: 7,500; Referee: Sándor Piller (Hungary)

==== Second round ====
Oct 21, 1992 First leg	Luzern (Switzerland)	1-0	(Netherlands) Feyenoord	De Kuip, Luzern
	Rueda 75'			Attendance: 11,700; Referee: Loizos Loizou (Cyprus)

Nov 2, 1992 Second leg	Feyenoord (Netherlands)	4-1 (2-4 agg.)	(Switzerland) Luzern	De Kuip, Rotterdam
	Taument 2'; Blinker 16'; Kiprich 55', 83' (pen.)		Nadig 12'	Attendance: 27,231; Referee: Alan Snoddy (Northern Ireland)

==== Quarter-finals ====
Mar 2, 1993 First leg	Feyenoord (Netherlands)	0-1	(Russia) Spartak Moscow	De Kuip, Rotterdam
			Pyatnitsky 36'	Attendance: 33,187; Referee: Karl-Josef Assenmacher (Germany)

Mar 18, 1993 Second leg	Spartak Moscow (Israel)	3-1 (1-4 agg.)	(Netherlands) Feyenoord	Eduard Streltsov Stadium, Moscow
	Karpin 8', 81'; Radchenko 90'		Kiprich 14'	Attendance: 15,250; Referee: Joël Quiniou (France)
