= Jackie McNamara =

Scottish footballer (born 1973)

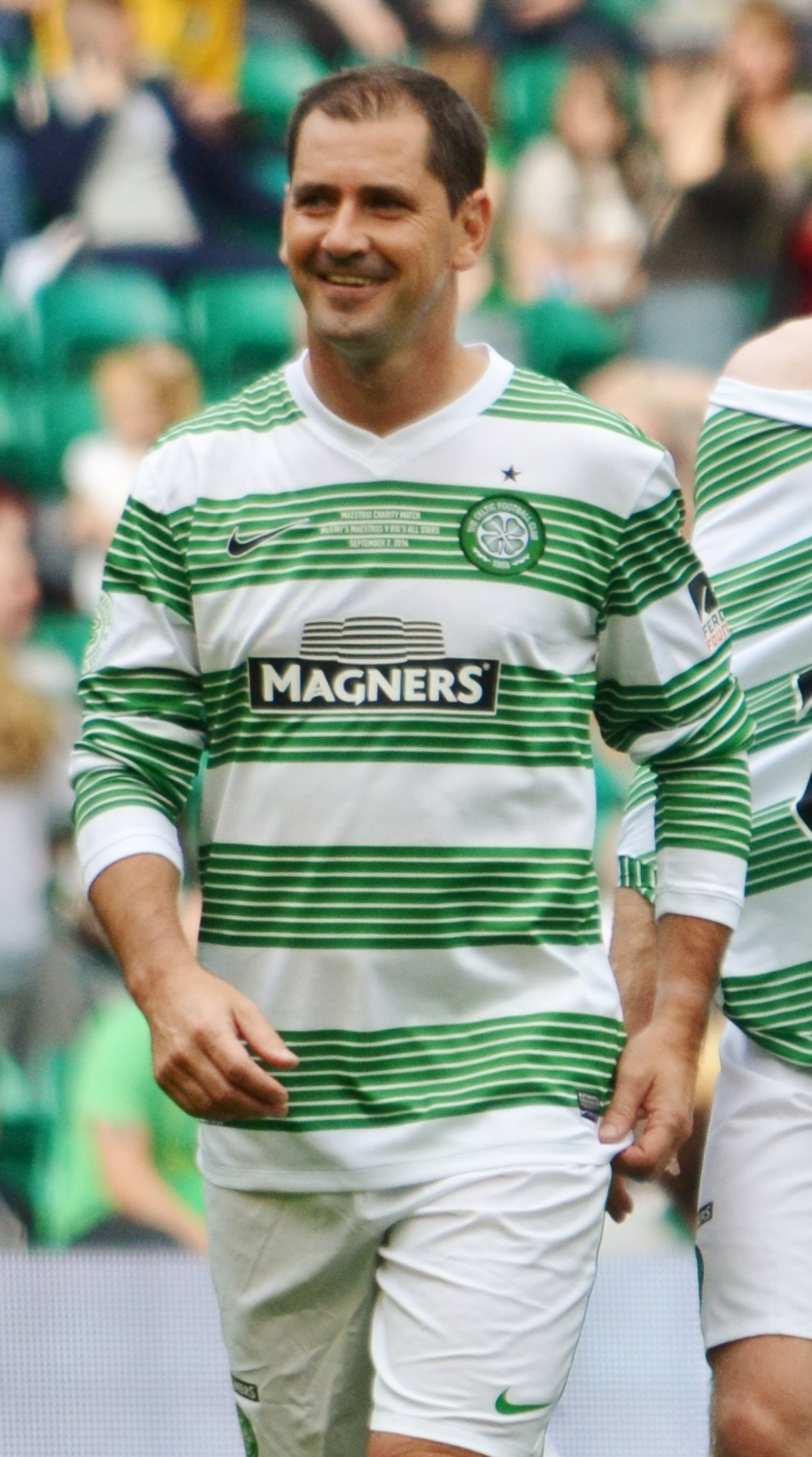
- McNamara playing in a charity match in 2014

Personal information
- Full name: Jackie McNamara
- Date of birth: 24 October 1973 (age 53)
- Place of birth: Glasgow, Scotland
- Height: 5 ft 9 in (1.75 m)
- Position: Defender

Youth career
- Cumbernauld Colts
- –1991: Gairdoch United

Senior career*
Years	Team	Apps	(Gls)
1991–1995	Dunfermline Athletic	79	(3)
1995–2005	Celtic	256	(10)
2005–2007	Wolverhampton Wanderers	29	(0)
2007–2008	Aberdeen	17	(0)
2008–2010	Falkirk	42	(0)
2010	→ Partick Thistle (loan)	4	(0)
2010–2011	Partick Thistle	15	(0)
Total		442	(13)

International career
1994–1996	Scotland U21	12	(1)
1996	Scotland B	1	(0)
1996–2005	Scotland	33	(0)

Managerial career
- 2011–2013: Partick Thistle
- 2013–2015: Dundee United
- 2015–2016: York City
- * Club domestic league appearances and goals

Jackie McNamara (born 24 October 1973) is a Scottish professional football agent, and former player, manager and executive. He won 33 international caps playing for Scotland, and filled a variety of defensive roles in his career.

McNamara began his playing career with Dunfermline Athletic before joining Celtic in 1995. During ten years at the club he won the Scottish Premier League title four times and the Scottish Cup and Scottish League Cup three times each. He then played in England with Wolverhampton Wanderers before returning to Scotland, finishing his career with spells at Aberdeen, Falkirk and Partick Thistle.

In international football, McNamara played for Scotland at under-21 and B international levels, and made 33 full international appearances. He was a member of the Scotland squad that played at the 1998 FIFA World Cup.

McNamara moved into management with Partick Thistle in April 2011, before his appointment at Dundee United in January 2013. He was sacked by Dundee United in September 2015, and two months later took over as manager of York City. He then worked as chief executive at York City. He is currently working with Dunfermline Athletic as a consultant.

== Early life ==
McNamara was born at Glasgow Royal Maternity Hospital in Glasgow and is the son of Jackie McNamara Sr., a former professional footballer, and Linda Houston. He played youth football for Cumbernauld Colts and Falkirk-based Gairdoch United.

== Club career ==
=== Dunfermline Athletic ===
McNamara joined Dunfermline Athletic from Gairdoch United on 17 September 1991.

=== Celtic ===
McNamara moved to Celtic for a £600,000 fee on 3 October 1995. He made an impressive start to his Celtic career, being named PFA Scotland Young Player of the Year in 1996. McNamara won his first trophy with the club in the 1997–98 season when Celtic won the Scottish Premier Division, preventing arch-rivals Rangers from winning ten-in-a-row, which would have seen them eclipse Celtic's record of nine-in-a-row. He was recognised for his performances this season by his fellow players when being named the PFA Scotland Players' Player of the Year in 1998 and finished runner-up to Craig Burley for the SFWA award. He featured regularly in the Celtic first eleven until the arrival of Martin O'Neill in the 2000–01 season saw him become more of a fringe player, although he did score the opening goal in the 2001 Scottish Cup Final, a 3–0 win over Hibernian at Hampden Park. He was suspended for their 3–0 victory over Kilmarnock at Hampden Park in the 2001 Scottish League Cup Final.

McNamara re-established himself in the team in 2003–04 and was awarded the SFWA Footballer of the Year in 2004, beating off competition from his teammates Henrik Larsson and Chris Sutton. The following year McNamara was named captain when Paul Lambert was injured. McNamara proved himself a consistent and reliable performer on the field, playing almost every game in the league in the 2004–05 season. To reward his loyalty to the club over a ten-year period, Celtic played a testimonial match against the Republic of Ireland. At the end of the 2004–05 season Martin O'Neill left as manager and Celtic brought in Gordon Strachan as his replacement.

McNamara's contract was also due to expire at the end of the 2004–05 season. Strachan assured McNamara that he wanted him at the club but Celtic were slow to offer a new contract, waiting until the close season to do so. By that time McNamara had already accepted an offer from Wolverhampton Wanderers as he had assumed Celtic no longer wanted his services. As he went on record saying he still wanted to play for the club, he was told he was still needed by the club by its manager, and he was offered the contract he wanted while still in a position to accept it, the incident has caused much speculation amongst supporters and the media as to who was to blame for his departure from Celtic. The club accused McNamara of being unreasonable and of moving for monetary reasons. They also blamed his agent for not encouraging negotiations and setting unhelpful deadlines.

McNamara had gone on record as saying he wanted to end his career with Celtic and seemed to be bemused when no new contract was forthcoming. After he had accepted the Wolves offer, McNamara felt that Celtic showed a lack of respect to him in their comments to the media and he accused them of harming his reputation for their own benefit. It also emerged that in his new contract at Wolves, he was earning the same wages as his previous contract with Celtic.

=== Wolverhampton Wanderers ===
McNamara agreed with manager Glenn Hoddle that he would join Wolverhampton Wanderers in the summer of 2005 on a free transfer. After a promising start to his Wolves career, the player sustained a cruciate knee ligament injury in the home match with Leicester City in September 2005. He came back in the penultimate game of the 2005–06 season at home to Brighton & Hove Albion. McNamara was a regular fixture in the 2006–07 Wolves team who finished 5th in the Football League Championship, reaching the play-offs.

=== Aberdeen ===
McNamara joined Aberdeen from Wolves on a two-year contract in May 2007, but he left Pittodrie before the end of the season, with manager Jimmy Calderwood citing "travelling and injuries" as the reasons for his departure. Three weeks later, it was revealed that McNamara would join Falkirk for the 2008–09 season.

=== Falkirk ===
McNamara signed a two-year contract at Falkirk in May 2008.

=== Partick Thistle ===
McNamara signed a one-month loan deal with Partick Thistle in February 2010, making him available to debut the following day against Dundee if selected. The terms of the deal allowed it to be extended beyond its initial period, but McNamara suffered a leg break during a match against Ayr United, prematurely ending his 2009–10 season. McNamara subsequently signed a one-year contract with Thistle for the 2010–11 season, which then continued on a one-year rolling contract basis.

== International career ==
=== Under-21 ===
McNamara made his debut for the Scotland national under-21 team in a 2–1 away win over Greece on 13 December 1994, in a 1996 UEFA European Under-21 Championship qualifier. His first goal came in the reverse fixture, a 3–0 home win on 15 August 1995. McNamara finished his under-21 career with 12 caps and one goal, earned between 1994 and 1996.

=== Senior ===
McNamara was capped once by the B team, in a 3–0 away defeat to Denmark on 23 April 1996, before making his debut for the senior team in a 2–0 away win over Latvia in a 1998 FIFA World Cup qualifier on 5 October 1996. He was selected for the Scotland squad in the 1998 FIFA World Cup. He did not feature in the opening match, a 2–1 defeat against defending champions Brazil in Paris. His introduction from the bench in Scotland's second match, against Norway in Bordeaux, was seen as pivotal in wiping out a one-goal deficit. The game finished in a 1–1 draw, leaving Scotland with a chance of qualification to the knockout stages. Ultimately the efforts were futile as Morocco were victorious in St Etienne with a 3–0 win in the final match and Norway managed to qualify from the group with a win against Brazil. McNamara earned 33 caps for Scotland between 1996 and 2005.

== Managerial career ==
=== Partick Thistle ===
McNamara began his managerial career at Partick Thistle where he was appointed caretaker manager on 15 April 2011, after Ian McCall left his job. He was then appointed manager on a one-year rolling contract a month later. Thistle performed well in his second season as manager, reaching the Challenge Cup final and lying in second place in the First Division in late January 2013. At this point he left Thistle to take the vacant position at SPL club Dundee United. McNamara was replaced at Partick Thistle by Alan Archibald, a former Thistle and Dundee United defender.

=== Dundee United ===
McNamara's first match in charge of his new club was a fifth round Scottish Cup tie with Third Division Rangers on 2 February 2013. United won 3–0, with Johnny Russell putting the home side ahead in the first minute of the match. The following week United defeated Hearts 3–1 in McNamara's first Scottish Premier League match as manager of the side. It was the side's first league win at home since August 2012. On 24 February 2014, McNamara extended his contract with Dundee United until 2017.

McNamara's first full season at Tannadice saw United reach the Scottish Cup Final, which his side lost 2–0 to St Johnstone. The following season United lost the League Cup Final to Celtic, 2–0. The latter few months of that season also saw a sharp dip in United's form following the sale in January 2015 of Gary Mackay-Steven and Stuart Armstrong.

Reports following Dundee United's 2–1 defeat to St Johnstone on 26 September 2015 suggested McNamara had been relieved of his duties, which was confirmed by the club two days later.

=== York City ===
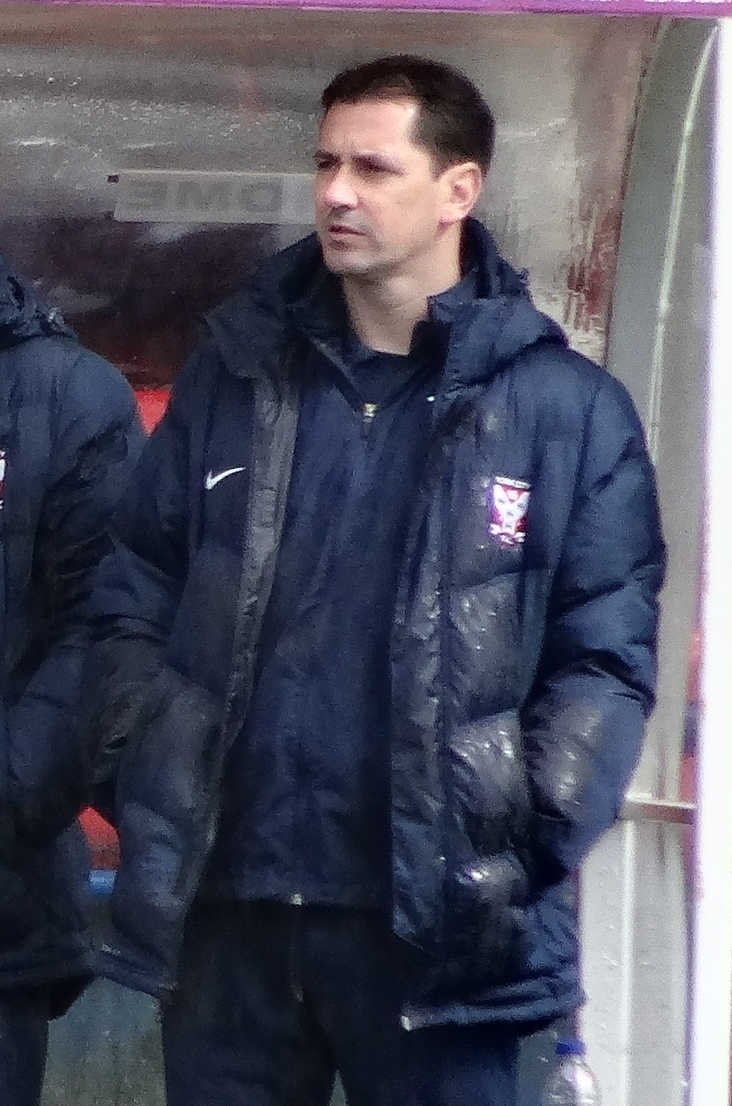
McNamara with York City in 2016

McNamara was appointed manager of League Two club York City on 4 November 2015, and his first match in charge came three days later, with a 3–2 away defeat to Accrington Stanley in the FA Cup first round. In April 2016, York's relegation from the Football League was confirmed by a 3–0 defeat against Accrington. In October 2016, a 6–1 defeat against the division's bottom club, Guiseley, left York in 20th place in the National League.

Following talks between McNamara and the club, York announced the manager would resign if they failed to gain a "positive result" in their next match, against Braintree Town. Following a 1–1 draw in that match, McNamara announced he would be stepping down, but had agreed to stay on as manager until a replacement was found. When Gary Mills was reappointed manager on 16 October 2016, McNamara took on the role of chief executive at the club. He left this position in March 2018.

=== Return to Dunfermline Athletic ===
In January 2019, McNamara returned to Scottish football as a consultant at previous club Dunfermline Athletic.

== Personal life ==
McNamara co-wrote a television sitcom pilot with Scottish actor and comedy writer Fran Gilhooley called The Therapy Room, starring Jackie's actor brother, Donny. The show is based around a young footballer who is catapulted from amateur football to the English top flight, and is partly based around McNamara's own experiences as a player and manager.

McNamara was taken to the intensive care unit of Hull Royal Infirmary in February 2020, after he collapsed near his home in York, having suffered a brain hemorrhage. His condition was described at one point as "critical but stable", but after a few weeks of care he was able to return home.

== Career statistics ==
=== Club ===
Appearances and goals by club, season and competition
Club	Season	League			National cup (Note: Includes Scottish Cup, FA Cup)		League cup (Note: Includes Scottish League Cup, League Cup)		Other		Total	
Club	Season	Division	Apps	Goals	Apps	Goals	Apps	Goals	Apps	Goals	Apps	Goals
Dunfermline Athletic	1992–93	Scottish First Division	3	0	0	0	0	0	1 (Note: Appearance(s) in Scottish Challenge Cup)	0	4	0
Dunfermline Athletic	1993–94	Scottish First Division	39	0	2	0	0	0	2	0	43	0
Dunfermline Athletic	1994–95	Scottish First Division	30	2	1	0	1	0	5 (Note: Three appearances in Scottish Challenge Cup, two in Scottish Premier Division play-off)	0	37	2
Dunfermline Athletic	1995–96	Scottish First Division	7	1	—		2	0	3	1	12	2
Dunfermline Athletic	Total		79	3	3	0	3	0	11	1	96	4
Celtic	1995–96	Scottish Premier Division	26	1	4	0	—		0	0	30	1
Celtic	1996–97	Scottish Premier Division	30	1	5	0	3	0	4 (Note: Appearances in UEFA Cup)	0	42	1
Celtic	1997–98	Scottish Premier Division	31	2	2	0	4	0	6	1	43	3
Celtic	1998–99	Scottish Premier League	16	0	2	0	1	0	6 (Note: Four appearances in UEFA Champions League, two in UEFA Cup)	0	25	0
Celtic	1999–2000	Scottish Premier League	23	0	0	0	4	0	4	0	31	0
Celtic	2000–01	Scottish Premier League	30	3	4	3	3	1	5	0	42	7
Celtic	2001–02	Scottish Premier League	20	0	4	0	2	0	4 (Note: Three appearances in UEFA Champions League, one in UEFA Cup)	0	30	0
Celtic	2002–03	Scottish Premier League	19	1	2	0	0	0	7 (Note: One appearance in UEFA Champions League, six in UEFA Cup)	0	28	1
Celtic	2003–04	Scottish Premier League	27	1	4	0	1	0	11 (Note: Five appearances in UEFA Champions League, six in UEFA Cup)	0	43	1
Celtic	2004–05	Scottish Premier League	34	1	4	0	1	0	5 (Note: Appearances in UEFA Champions League)	0	44	1
Celtic	Total		256	10	31	3	19	1	52	1	358	15
Wolverhampton Wanderers	2005–06	Championship	10	0	0	0	1	0	—		11	0
Wolverhampton Wanderers	2006–07	Championship	19	0	2	0	0	0	2 (Note: Appearances in Championship play-offs)	0	23	0
Wolverhampton Wanderers	Total		29	0	2	0	1	0	2	0	34	0
Aberdeen	2007–08	Scottish Premier League	17	0	3	0	2	0	3	0	25	0
Falkirk	2008–09	Scottish Premier League	29	0	4	0	4	0	—		37	0
Falkirk	2009–10	Scottish Premier League	13	0	1	0	1	0	2 (Note: Appearances in UEFA Europa League)	0	17	0
Falkirk	Total		42	0	5	0	5	0	2	0	54	0
Partick Thistle (loan)	2009–10	Scottish First Division	4	0	—		—		—		4	0
Partick Thistle	2010–11	Scottish First Division	15	0	1	0	0	0	2	0	18	0
Career total			442	13	45	3	30	1	72	2	589	19

=== International ===
Appearances and goals by national team and year
National team	Year	Apps	Goals
Scotland	1996	2	0
Scotland	1997	2	0
Scotland	1998	5	0
Scotland	2000	2	0
Scotland	2001	1	0
Scotland	2002	2	0
Scotland	2003	9	0
Scotland	2004	5	0
Scotland	2005	5	0
Total		33	0

== Managerial statistics ==
As of 16 October 2016

Managerial record by team and tenure
Team	From	To	Record				
Team	From	To	P	W	D	L	Win %
Partick Thistle	15 April 2011	30 January 2013	75	34	17	24	45.3
Dundee United	30 January 2013	28 September 2015	119	51	24	44	42.9
York City	4 November 2015	16 October 2016	48	8	12	28	16.7
Total			242	93	53	96	38.4

== Honours ==
=== Player ===
Celtic

- Scottish Premier Division/Scottish Premier League: 1997–98, 2000–01, 2001–02, 2003–04
- Scottish Cup: 2000–01, 2003–04, 2004–05; runner-up: 2001–02
- Scottish League Cup: 1997–98, 1999–2000; runner-up: 2002–03
- UEFA Cup runner-up: 2002–03

Falkirk

- Scottish Cup runner-up: 2008–09

Individual

- PFA Scotland Young Player of the Year: 1996
- PFA Scotland Players' Player of the Year: 1998
- SFWA Footballer of the Year: 2004

=== Manager ===
Dundee United

- Scottish Cup runner-up: 2013–14
- Scottish League Cup runner-up: 2014–15

== See also ==
- List of Scotland national football team captains
- List of Scottish football families

Sporting positions
Preceded by Paul Lambert	Celtic F.C captain 2004–2005	Succeeded by Neil Lennon
