= Stiliyan Petrov =

Bulgarian footballer (born 1979)

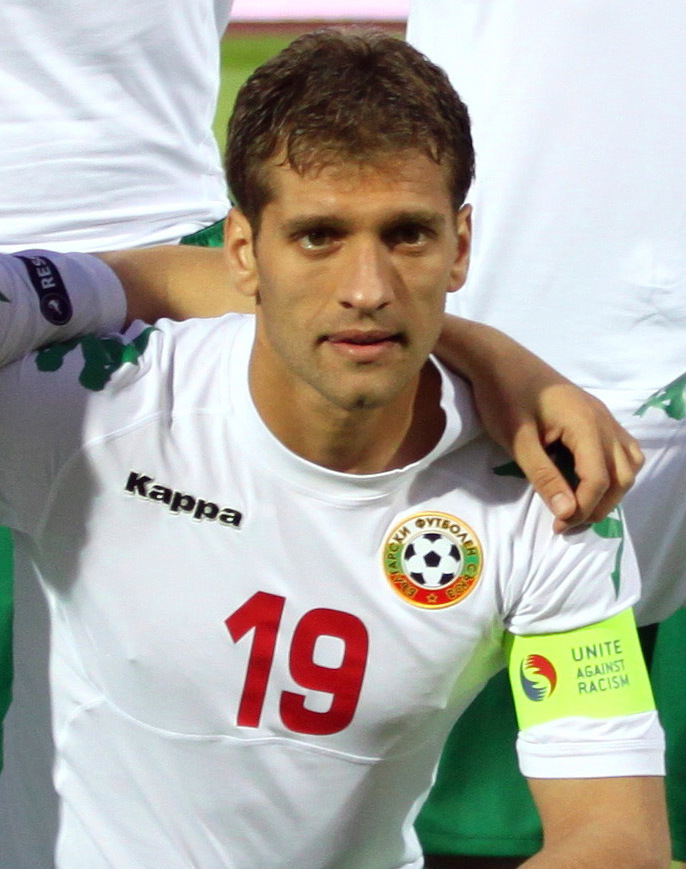
- Petrov with Bulgaria in 2011

Personal information
- Full name: Stiliyan Alyoshev Petrov
- Date of birth: 5 July 1979 (age 47)
- Place of birth: Montana, Bulgaria
- Height: 1.80 m (5 ft 11 in)
- Position: Midfielder

Youth career
- Montana

Senior career*
Years	Team	Apps	(Gls)
1995–1996	Montana	21	(4)
1996–1999	CSKA Sofia	45	(3)
1999–2006	Celtic	228	(64)
2006–2013	Aston Villa	185	(9)
Total		479	(80)

International career
1998–2013	Bulgaria	105	(8)

Managerial career
- 2013: Aston Villa Academy (assistant)
- 2015: Aston Villa (team coach)
- * Club domestic league appearances and goals

Stiliyan Alyoshev Petrov (Bulgarian: Стилиян Альошев Петров, born 5 July 1979) is a Bulgarian former professional footballer who played as a midfielder. Petrov joined Celtic from CSKA Sofia in 1999, and won ten trophies in his time at Celtic Park, including four Scottish Premier League titles. In 2006, he moved to Aston Villa in the Premier League, along with his former manager Martin O'Neill. Petrov became club captain at Villa Park, and was an inductee to the Aston Villa Hall of Fame in 2013 having made 219 competitive appearances for the club.

In addition, Petrov is Bulgaria's all-time most-capped player with 105 appearances for the national team.

In March 2012, Petrov was diagnosed with acute leukaemia, suspending his football career to undergo treatment which was ultimately successful. He officially announced his retirement from the game in May 2013. Following spells as both a youth team and first team coach at Aston Villa in 2013 and 2015, Petrov returned to training in 2016, initially with the under-21 side, and later the seniors. He played during pre-season matches but was not offered a playing contract by manager Roberto Di Matteo.

== Club career ==
=== Early career ===
Born in Montana, Petrov started to play football in the local team FC Montana. At the age of 18 he was spotted by scout and coach Dimitar Penev and signed with CSKA Sofia for fee of €30,000. With his new club, he won the Bulgarian Championship in 1997 and the national cup in 1997 and 1999.

=== Celtic ===
Petrov was signed in the summer of 1999 by John Barnes for a fee of £2.8 million. The teenager featured prominently in a season where he won the League Cup with Celtic, his second major honour and the first of many with Celtic. Despite the happy end to the season Petrov had a very hard time starting with the club. He was homesick and lonely at the start, and could not speak English. This was made worse by the manager playing him out of position at right back. Eventually, he improved his English by working in a friend's burger van. This hard work and determination to fit in showed in his performances for the club.

After a good first season with Celtic he enjoyed a brilliant second season under Martin O'Neill's treble winning side, becoming a regular scorer netting 7 league goals in 28 appearances, one of which was in Celtic's 6–2 victory over Rangers. He also became the first foreign player to win the SPFA Young Player of the Year award. However he missed the end of the season after breaking his leg in a league game against St Johnstone and missed both the Scottish League Cup and Scottish Cup finals as a result.

The following season, 2001–02, Petrov made his return from injury against Dunfermline Athletic in September, and then really came into form for Celtic, being described as a dynamic, hardworking box-to-box midfielder, and winning his second SPL medal. He was shortlisted SPFA Player of the Year in 2002.

In his fourth season with Celtic, Petrov continued his good form and was being linked to some of the top clubs in Europe but after protracted contract talks he eventually agreed a new deal with Celtic. This was his highest ever goalscoring season, netting 14 in 50 appearances. He also got to the only European final of his career, getting a runner's up medal in the UEFA Cup.

In his next two seasons for Celtic he continued to be an essential player making 105 appearances and scoring 19 goals. He won the Scottish Cup twice in this time (scoring in the 2004 final) along with his third SPL medal. The 2004–05 season was Martin O'Neill's last at Celtic, although Stiliyan Petrov would later join him at Aston Villa. The season also saw Petrov becoming the third player to win the Celtic Player of The Year award.

The 2005–06 season was a time of great change for Celtic. Martin O'Neill, the club's most successful manager in 20 years, left and new manager Gordon Strachan came in. Things started badly for Celtic as they lost 5–0 to Slovak minnows Artmedia Bratislava in Strachan's first match. Celtic then managed to throw away a 3–1 lead over Motherwell to draw Strachan's first league match 4–4, although Petrov later helped Celtic exact revenge over the Fir Park side by scoring his first hat-trick in a 5–0 demolition in October that year. Celtic overcame their bad start to the campaign to win the SPL and League Cup double.

The 2005–06 season proved to be his last at Celtic as he re-united with former manager Martin O'Neill at Aston Villa for a fee of £6.5 million (rising to £8 million after clauses). He only made three appearances for Celtic before leaving in the summer transfer window.

In all, Petrov made 312 appearances for Celtic over seven years, scoring 55 goals. He won the SPL four times and also won both the Scottish and Scottish League Cup 3 times each. He was the tenth most prolific goalscorer in the SPL (55 goals) when he left Celtic. Petrov was also shortlisted for the SPFA Players' Player of the Year three times as a Celtic player.

=== Aston Villa ===
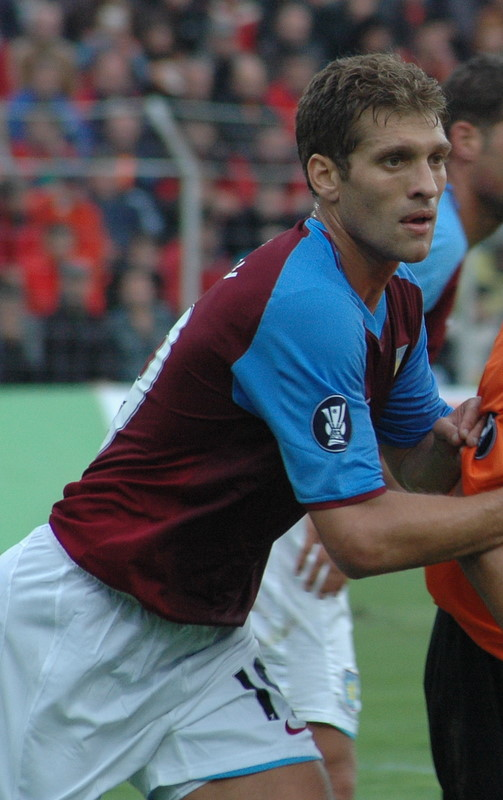
Petrov playing for Aston Villa in 2008

In April 2006, Celtic rejected a written transfer request submitted by Petrov. He was subsequently linked with a transfer to move to Aston Villa who were managed by former Celtic boss Martin O'Neill. On 30 August 2006, 27-year-old Petrov completed his move to Villa Park on a four-year deal worth £6.5 million, becoming O'Neill's first signing for Villa. His debut was against West Ham United on 10 September. The game finished 1–1. In 2007, Petrov changed his shirt number from 11 to 19. Petrov scored his first Villa goal in a 2–2 draw against Sheffield United on 11 December 2006, but suffered patchy form throughout his first two seasons at the club.

He scored a volley from near the halfway line against already relegated Derby County on 12 April 2008. This was his first goal of the season and Villa won 6–0. This goal was marked as a possible candidate for "goal of the season". It was also confirmed to be the furthest out recorded goal by an Aston Villa player since the club was formed.

The 2008–09 season saw Petrov's form improve considerably as he became a first team regular, starting Villa's six Premier League games in a row. He was named captain for the first time in the UEFA Cup game against the Bulgarian Litex Lovech on 2 October 2008 and also scored one of the goals in the game.

In May 2009, Petrov was named both Aston Villa's supporters' "Player of the Year" and "Players' Player of the Year" for the 2008–09 season, after his notable consistency in midfield throughout the season. On 20 May 2009 he signed a new four-year deal that is set to keep him at the club until 2013.

Following the retirement of captain Martin Laursen, Petrov stated that leading a "great club with a long tradition and history" would be "a great honour". Petrov became Villa captain in the summer of 2009 and led the team to sixth place in the Premier league, the semi-finals of the FA Cup and the final of the League Cup in his first season holding the armband.

Petrov continued to retain the Villa captaincy after the appointment of Gérard Houllier as manager of the club. On 23 October 2010, he sustained a knee injury in the 1–0 away loss against Sunderland at the Stadium of Light. On 26 December 2010, Petrov returned to first team action, coming on as a second-half substitute for Jonathan Hogg in the 2–1 defeat against Tottenham Hotspur at Villa Park. On 26 February 2011, Petrov made his 150th premier league appearance for Aston Villa at Villa Park, when he came on as a second-half substitute in the 76th minute for Robert Pires in the 4–1 win over Blackburn Rovers. On 10 September 2011, Petrov scored his first goal of the season away at Everton. On 29 October 2011, Petrov made his 200th appearance for Aston Villa in the Premier League clash with Sunderland, and scored the opening goal in a 2–2 draw.

==== Career break due to leukaemia ====
Petrov announced his retirement from football on 9 May 2013, due to his leukaemia.

On 26 May 2013, footballers who had represented the Bulgaria national side (including Hristo Stoichkov, Dimitar Berbatov and Nasko Sirakov) won 4–2 against a selection that featured Aston Villa veterans like Mark Kinsella and Bryan Small in an exhibition game that took place at the Vasil Levski National Stadium in Sofia and had been organised to honour Petrov's achievements.

In October 2014, Petrov began playing again for his local Sunday League Over-35s side Wychall Wanderers who were managed by former Coventry City player David Busst.

In March 2015, he rejoined Aston Villa in a coaching role.

In April 2016, Petrov revealed he was training with Villa's Under-21 side with a view to returning to the professional game. In June, it was announced that he would be training with the first team during their pre-season tour of Austria, on a non-contractual basis. On 9 July 2016, Petrov played his first game with the Aston Villa first team since his illness, taking part in an 8–0 friendly victory over local Austrian team GAK.

== International career ==
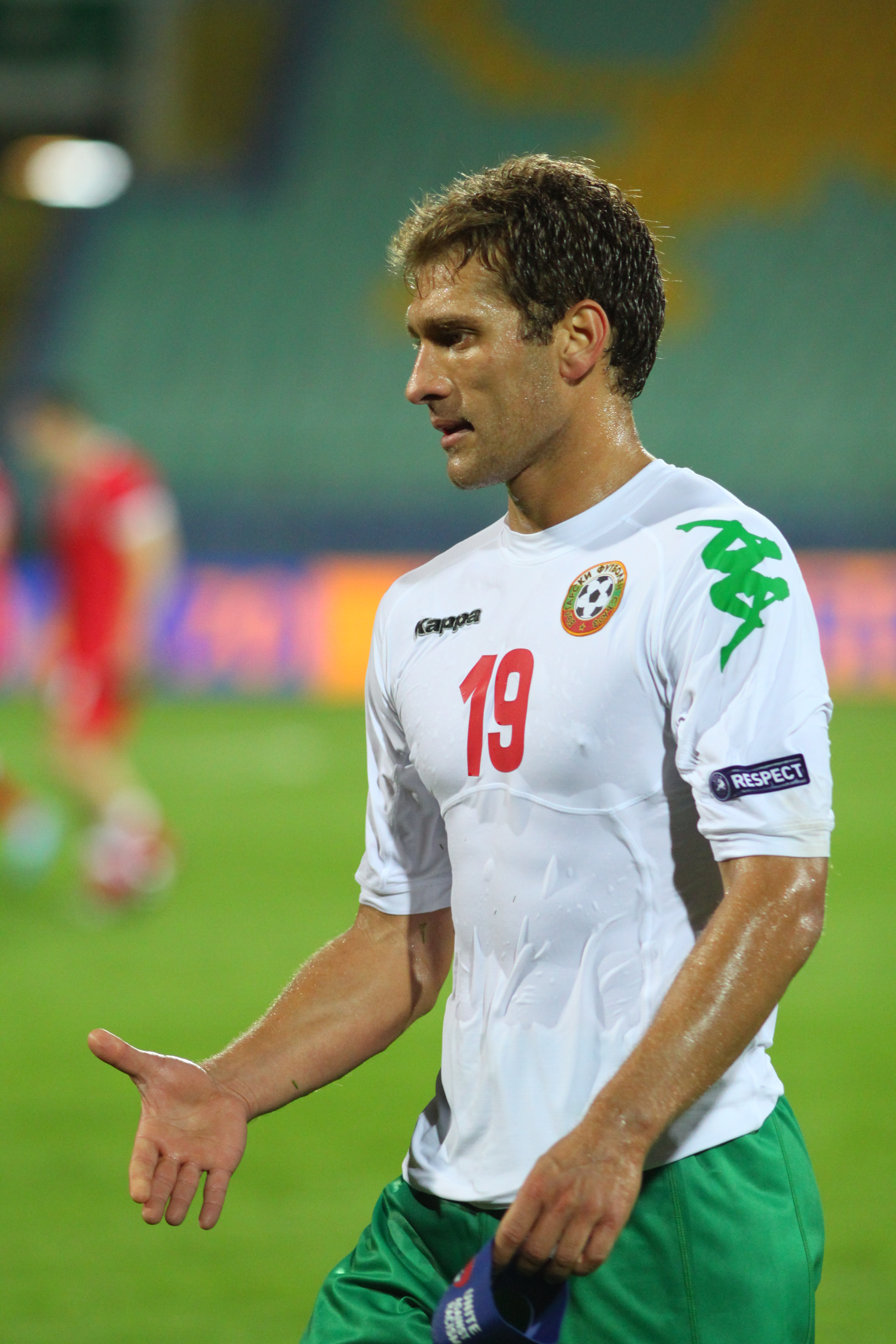
Petrov with Bulgaria in 2011

Stilyan Petrov made his debut as a 52nd minute substitute for Bulgaria on 24 December 1998 in a friendly match against Morocco. The match was played in Agadir, Morocco and finished with a 4–1 win for the North Africans. He scored his first goal (80th minute) for the national side in another friendly match against Belarus (4–1) on 29 March 2000.

In 2003, he won the Bulgarian Footballer of the Year award, when he was playing for Celtic and he captained the national team at Euro 2004 where he was sent off during a match against Denmark.

On 12 October 2006, Petrov, then captain of Bulgaria, announced his decision to retire from international football at the age of 27 as long as Hristo Stoichkov manages the Bulgaria national team. However, on 20 March 2007, he made amends with Hristo Stoichkov and made himself available for selection again. However, he did not recover his position as national captain because it was decided that Dimitar Berbatov would retain the captain's armband. On 14 January 2010, it was announced that Petrov had come second in Bulgaria's Player of the Year. Petrov was renamed captain of the Bulgarian side again following the retirement of Berbatov from international football in 2010. On 26 March 2011, Petrov earned his 100th cap for Bulgaria in the 0–0 home draw with Switzerland in a Euro 2012 qualifier. He received a flower bouquet from Borislav Mihaylov and was applauded by the spectators prior to the start of the match.

During his career Petrov was chosen as Bulgarian Footballer of the Year in 2003. He placed second in 2000, 2001, 2005, 2009 and 2011, and third in 2002 and 2006.

== Personal life ==
In 2005, Petrov wrote his autobiography with the assistance of Sunday Mail sports journalist Mark Guidi entitled You Can Call Me Stan, in reference to his nickname "Stan", a shortened form of his given name. In the book, he describes how "Stiliyan" is the correct spelling, rather than "Stilian", as it is sometimes spelled in the press.

He and his wife Paulina have two sons, Kristiyan and Stiliyan Jr. The latter announced in April 2025 that he was standing as a candidate for Reform UK. In response, the elder Petrov said he had no interest in politics and that his son was "his own man".

=== Leukaemia ===
On 30 March 2012, Petrov was diagnosed with acute lymphoblastic leukaemia. The condition was diagnosed following tests after Petrov developed a fever following Aston Villa's 3–0 defeat to Arsenal. Because of this, Petrov told Bulgarian press that he planned to retire from club and international football; his agent later denied any reports of retirement: "It is not true that Stiliyan has said he is retiring from football. What he did say was that he was fighting for his life and that he will fight to recover." He visited Villa Park for the match against Chelsea and in the 19th minute, the number of his shirt, the crowd gave him an ovation. The tribute caught the imagination of fans, and home and away fans repeated the ovation at every Villa game that season.

On 10 June 2012, Aston Villa manager Paul Lambert announced that Petrov would remain Aston Villa's club captain for the 2012–13 season. In his absence the team captaincy was taken over by Dutch defender Ron Vlaar. On his 33rd birthday, Petrov visited his teammates on the first day of their pre season training, and was presented with a cake by the players, who sang happy birthday to him and gave him a round of applause.

On 2 August 2012, it was announced that Petrov's leukaemia was in remission.

Petrov announced his retirement from football on 9 May 2013, and led his family out on the Villa Park pitch for a lap of honour, to applaud the Villa fans who supported him during his illness, on the final day of the 2012–13 season.

== Coaching ==
On 22 May 2013, shortly after announcing his retirement from playing, Aston Villa announced that Petrov would take on a new role at the club as assistant of the Youth Development squad, working alongside Gordon Cowans.

Talking about his new role Petrov said "I'm very excited by this new challenge and I wish to thank the Club and the manager, Paul Lambert, for giving me the opportunity to continue my association with Villa, which I have always regarded as a privilege. I will study for my coaching badges over the coming months and I am looking forward very much to working with Gordon Cowans, someone I know and respect, a true Villa legend."

As of August 2013, Petrov was no longer part of the Villa coaching team. The Club announced his resignation and explained that he had requested time off as he felt he had to be fully devoted to his family. Petrov expressed gratitude to the club for the opportunity.

On 5 March 2015, Aston Villa Manager Tim Sherwood announced that Petrov would return to the Aston Villa backroom team and will help coach the First Team.

Petrov has completed his UEFA pro coaching licence, as well as a master's degree in Sports Management through UEFA, as of 2020. He is currently the director of a business venture, Player 4 Player, to support players to transition into retirement, alongside other former players including Gareth Farrelly, Emile Heskey and Gaizka Mendieta.

== Television ==
On 11 December 2014, Petrov appeared as a special guest on the eighth episode of the ninth series of Russell Howard's Good News. He often works as a pundit for games on Sky Sports and TNT Sports when Celtic are playing.

== Career statistics ==
=== Club ===
Appearances and goals by club, season and competition
Club	Season	League			National cup (Note: Includes Bulgarian Cup, Scottish Cup, FA Cup)		League cup (Note: Includes Scottish League Cup, Football League Cup)		Continental		Total	
Club	Season	Division	Apps	Goals	Apps	Goals	Apps	Goals	Apps	Goals	Apps	Goals
CSKA Sofia	1996–97	A Group	5	0			–		–		5	0
CSKA Sofia	1997–98	A Group	11	0	2	0	–		–		13	0
CSKA Sofia	1998–99	A Group	29	3	1	0	–		8 (Note: Appearance(s) in UEFA Cup)	0	38	3
CSKA Sofia	Total		45	3	3	0	–		8	0	56	3
Celtic	1999–2000	Scottish Premier League	26	1	0	0	2	0	1	0	29	1
Celtic	2000–01	Scottish Premier League	28	7	3	0	2	0	5	0	38	7
Celtic	2001–02	Scottish Premier League	28	6	5	1	3	0	8 (Note: Six appearances and one goal in UEFA Champions League, two appearances in UEFA Cup)	1	44	8
Celtic	2002–03	Scottish Premier League	34	12	0	0	2	0	14 (Note: Two appearances in UEFA Champions League, twelve appearances and two goals in UEFA Cup)	2	50	14
Celtic	2003–04	Scottish Premier League	35	6	5	3	0	0	15 (Note: Nine appearances and one goal in UEFA Champions League, six appearances in UEFA Cup)	1	55	7
Celtic	2004–05	Scottish Premier League	37	11	5	1	1	0	6 (Note: Appearances in UEFA Champions League)	0	49	12
Celtic	2005–06	Scottish Premier League	37	10	0	0	4	0	2	0	43	10
Celtic	2006–07	Scottish Premier League	3	2	–		–		–		3	2
Celtic	Total		228	55	18	5	14	0	51	4	311	64
Aston Villa	2006–07	Premier League	30	2	1	0	3	0	–		34	2
Aston Villa	2007–08	Premier League	28	1	1	0	2	0	–		31	1
Aston Villa	2008–09	Premier League	36	1	3	0	1	0	7	1	47	2
Aston Villa	2009–10	Premier League	37	0	3	1	6	0	1 (Note: Appearance in UEFA Europa League)	0	47	1
Aston Villa	2010–11	Premier League	27	1	2	1	0	0	1	0	30	2
Aston Villa	2011–12	Premier League	27	4	2	0	1	0	–		30	4
Aston Villa	2012–13	Premier League	0	0	0	0	0	0	–		0	0
Aston Villa	Total		185	9	12	2	13	0	9	1	219	12
Career total			458	67	33	7	27	0	68	5	586	79

=== International ===
Scores and results list Bulgaria's goal tally first, score column indicates score after each Petrov goal.

List of international goals scored by Stiliyan Petrov
No.	Date	Venue	Opponent	Score	Result	Competition
1	29 March 2000	Stadion Georgi Asparuhov, Sofia, Bulgaria	Belarus	4–1	4–1	Friendly
2	24 January 2001	Estadio Morelos, Morelia, Mexico	Mexico	1–0	2–0	Friendly
3	28 February 2001	King Abdullah II Stadium, Amman, Jordan	Jordan	2–0	2–0	Friendly
4	7 September 2002	King Baudouin Stadium, Brussels, Belgium	Belgium	2–0	2–0	UEFA Euro 2004 qualification
5	12 October 2002	Vasil Levski National Stadium, Sofia, Bulgaria	Croatia	1–0	2–0	UEFA Euro 2004 qualification
6	27 March 2003	Mladost Stadium, Kruševac, Serbia and Montenegro	Serbia and Montenegro	1–0	2–1	Friendly
7	30 March 2005	Szusza Ferenc Stadion, Budapest, Hungary	Hungary	1–0	1–1	2006 FIFA World Cup qualification
8	6 September 2008	Podgorica City Stadium, Podgorica, Montenegro	Montenegro	1–0	2–2	2010 FIFA World Cup qualification

== Honours ==
CSKA Sofia

- Bulgarian Championship: 1996–97
- Bulgarian Cup: 1996–97, 1998–99

Celtic

- Scottish Premier League: 2000–01, 2001–02, 2003–04, 2005–06
- Scottish Cup: 2000–01, 2003–04, 2004–05
- Scottish League Cup: 1999–2000, 2000–01, 2005–06
- UEFA Cup runner-up: 2002–03

Aston Villa

- Football League Cup runner-up: 2009–10

Wychall Wanderers

- Central Warwickshire Over-35s Premier Division One Cup

Individual

- Bulgarian Footballer of the Year: 2002–03
- SPFA Young Player of the Year: 2000–01
- Celtic Player of The Year: 2004–05
- Aston Villa Players' Player of the Year: 2008–09, 2011–12
- Aston Villa Supporters' Player of the Year: 2008–09
- Inductee in Aston Villa Hall of Fame: 2013
- BFU Award (100 caps)
- UEFA Centurions Award (100 caps)
- FIFPRO Merit Award: 2013

== See also ==
- List of men's footballers with 100 or more international caps
