= Eyal Berkovic =

Israeli former footballer

Eyal Berkovic 'אייל ברקוביץ
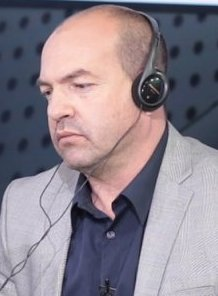
- Berkovic in 2020

Personal information
- Full name: Eyal Berkovic
- Date of birth: 2 April 1972 (age 54)
- Place of birth: Regba, Israel
- Height: 1.70 m (5 ft 7 in)
- Position: Attacking midfielder

Youth career
- 1982–1988: Maccabi Haifa

Senior career*
Years	Team	Apps	(Gls)
1989–1997	Maccabi Haifa	128	(25)
1996–1997	→ Southampton (loan)	28	(4)
1996–1999	West Ham United	65	(10)
1999–2001	Celtic	32	(9)
2001	→ Blackburn Rovers (loan)	11	(2)
2001–2004	Manchester City	56	(7)
2004–2005	Portsmouth	22	(2)
2005–2006	Maccabi Tel Aviv	25	(2)
Total		367	(61)

International career
1990	Israel U18	1	(0)
1991–1993	Israel U21	11	(1)
1992–2004	Israel	78	(9)

Managerial career
- 2014–2015: Hapoel Tel Aviv (general manager)
- 2020–2021: Hapoel Petah Tikva (general manager)
- * Club domestic league appearances and goals

Eyal Berkovic (or Berkovich, Hebrew: אייל ברקוביץ'; born 2 April 1972) is an Israeli former professional association footballer, football coach, team owner and television talk show presenter.

As a player he was an attacking midfielder who spent most of his career in England playing in the Premier League for Southampton, West Ham United, Blackburn Rovers, Manchester City and Portsmouth. He also had a spell in the Scottish Premier League with Celtic as well as beginning and finishing his career in his native Israel for Maccabi Haifa and Maccabi Tel Aviv. He made 78 appearances for Israel, and is considered one of the nation's greatest players. Graeme Souness described Berkovic as "a tremendous passer. In the last third of the field, he is the best that I've ever worked with." Berkovic was also noted for various clashes with managers and players, including Kevin Keegan (his manager at Manchester City), and Welsh striker John Hartson.

Following retirement he was appointed as general manager of Maccabi Netanya and later held a similar position at Hapoel Tel Aviv. He is the former owner of Hapoel Rishon LeZion.

== Early life ==
Berkovic was born in moshav Regba, Israel, to a family of Ashkenazi Jewish (Hungarian-Jewish) descent, and is the older brother of former Israeli footballer Nir Berkovic.

== Club career ==
=== Maccabi Haifa ===
Berkovic started his career at Maccabi Haifa in 1989, playing there until 1996. During his time with the club he won league titles in 1990–91 and 1993–94, and the State Cup three times, including a domestic double in the 1990–91 season. His performances for the club earned him a call-up to the Israel national team as well as the Most Valuable Player award for the 1993–94 season.

=== Southampton ===
For the 1996–97 season, Berkovic signed on a season-long loan for English club Southampton. He proved to be a big influence, and was a major part of a 6–3 victory in his second appearance, against Manchester United, as he scored twice and got three assists.

=== West Ham United ===
The next season, he was signed by manager Harry Redknapp for West Ham United for £1.75 million, for whom he played for two seasons. Well liked by West Ham fans, he became an instant fans' hero by scoring the decisive goal against Tottenham Hotspur in a 2–1 win on his Upton Park debut on 13 August 1997. He played in 79 games in all competitions, scoring 12 goals.

Striker John Hartson had a prolific 1997–98 season for West Ham helped by Berkovic's assists. In a training ground bust-up between the two, Hartson kicked Berkovic in the head, after Berkovic had punched Hartson in the leg as he attempted to help Berkovic to his feet after a crunching tackle. The incident was captured on camera. Berkovic said of the incident "if my head had been a ball, it would have been in the top corner of the net". Hartson was fined £20,000 for the incident and suspended for three games.

=== Celtic ===
Soon after the incident, he was signed for £5.75 million by Celtic, who were coached by John Barnes. In November 1999 Berkovic was subjected to religious taunts by Hearts fans while playing at their Tynecastle ground. He played for the Scottish club for two years, scoring ten goals, but Martin O'Neill left him out of the team when he took over as manager and Berkovic returned to England to join Blackburn Rovers on loan for the second half of the 2000–01 season, where he scored twice against Queens Park Rangers and Grimsby, helping Blackburn achieve promotion to the Premier League in the process. Berkovic's loan move to Blackburn was not made into a permanent deal. The following year Manchester City's manager Kevin Keegan signed him in a permanent move. During his tenure in Scotland, Berkovic struggled to win over the Celtic fans.

=== Manchester City ===
In July 2001, Berkovic joined Manchester City for a reported fee of £1.5 million. He made his debut in August 2001, scoring one goal in a 3–0 home win against Watford. In his second game for the team he suffered an injury which prompted the team to sign Ali Benarbia, an additional playmaker. When Berkovic returned, the City team began to play with both playmakers in a 3–5–2 formation with Kevin Horlock operating in the anchor midfield position. This was a successful formation, earning City promotion in emphatic style, with 99 points and a record 108 goals. In an FA Cup game against then-Premiership team Ipswich Town, Berkovic scored a volley goal set up by Benarbia from a corner and City beat the team in the league above them 4–1.

The following season when City were in the Premiership, Berkovic was instrumental in a 3–1 victory over local rivals Manchester United, a team he had also helped his previous team (Southampton) demolish 6–3 in the 1996–97 season. Eyal scored a brace. The tactic of playing with two playmakers was continued in the Premiership but results were not favourable and Keegan subsequently decided to play with Berkovic as the only playmaker. Berkovic was voted as Manchester City's player of the season in 2002–03 in the club's magazine. Berkovic received abuse from some of the City support when he made a 'throat-slitting' gesture to a female fan during a League Cup tie at Maine Road against Crewe Alexandra. The FA investigated the incident.

=== Portsmouth ===
A fallout with manager Keegan saw him move to Portsmouth for £500,000 in January 2004. His first game for them was against his former Manchester City side. Pompey beat the Cityzens 4–2. Berkovic soon established himself in the first team at Fratton Park where he was reunited with his former manager at West Ham, Redknapp, who described him as a "special footballer". Berkovic became a vital part of Portsmouth's drive for FA Premier League survival, scoring his first goal against Tottenham Hotspur.

However, despite scoring against Fulham in the league and Leeds in the League Cup, he failed to hold down a regular starting place in the team for the 2004–05 season, and in January 2005 left Portsmouth. He had been linked with a move to Crystal Palace but instead decided to return to the country of his birth. He wanted to return to Maccabi Haifa but was rejected, leading him to a decision to sign for bitter rivals Maccabi Tel Aviv.

=== Maccabi Tel Aviv ===
The return to Israel opened with promise as the 2005–06 season was the 100th anniversary for Maccabi Tel Aviv and the club wanted to celebrate with a championship. The club signed several more stars such as Avi Nimni, Giovani Rosso, Blessing Kaku, Avi Yehiel, and Eugen Trica. Berkovic announced at a press conference that the team would go all the way to secure the domestic double. Although the team had a positive start to the season, they were not able to sustain good form and their chances of winning the title diminished, resulting in a sacking of the coach Nir Klinger, who was replaced with Ton Caanen.

Berkovic announced his retirement from professional football on 7 May 2006.

== International career ==
Berkovic gained 78 caps and scored 9 goals for the senior Israel national team.

== Media career ==
From 2007 until 2023, Berkovic hosted a popular sports radio program along with Ofira Asayag.

In November 2017, the two began to present a weekly television show on Friday evenings, called Ofira and Berkovic, on Keshet Channel 12. The show achieved high ratings, but critics scolded the interviewers' vulgar style. Several interviews caused public controversy, such as with trans model Stav Strashko, or with rapper Dudu Faruk. Berkovic quit the show in 2023. Shortly after, he signed a contract with Reshet13, which made him one of the most highly paid TV personalities in Israel.

== Management career ==
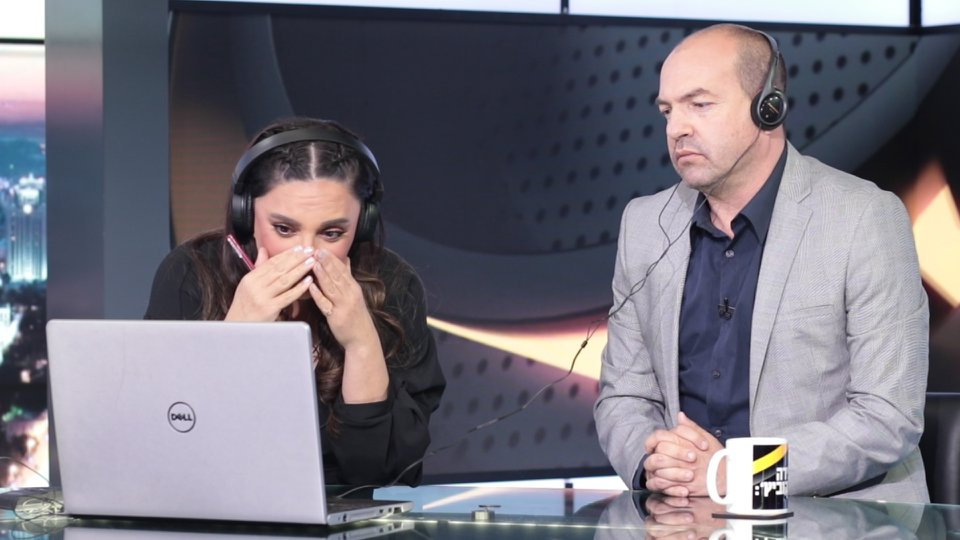
Berkovic co-hosting his television talkshow Ofira and Berkovic in 2020

In the summer of 2006 he was appointed as the general manager of Maccabi Netanya. However, he was manager only for two months in which time he did not oversee any games. He stated that he left the job due to poor professional relations with Daniel Jammer, the club's owner and chairman. Berkovic had been an active manager in the transfer market during his two months, signing 15 players including Mazuwa Nsumbu, Liran Strauber and Itay Shechter.

In May 2014 he was appointed as general manager of Hapoel Tel Aviv. In January 2015 he resigned following a breakdown in his relationship with club owner, Haim Ramon.

On 11 May 2015, Berkovic became the owner of Hapoel Rishon LeZion from Liga Leumit, he paid $385,000 for the ownership of the club.

== U.K. career statistics ==
Appearances and goals by club, season and competition
Club	Season	League			National Cup		League Cup		Europe		Total	
Club	Season	Division	Apps	Goals	Apps	Goals	Apps	Goals	Apps	Goals	Apps	Goals
Southampton (loan)	1996–97	Premier League	28	4	1	0	6	2	—		35	6
West Ham United	1997–98	Premier League	35	7	6	2	5	0	—		46	9
West Ham United	1998–99	Premier League	30	3	2	0	1	0	—		33	3
West Ham United	Total		65	10	8	2	6	0	—		79	12
Celtic	1999–2000	Scottish Premier League	28	9	1	0	1	0	3 (Note: Appearance(s) in UEFA Cup)	1	33	10
Celtic	2000–01	Scottish Premier League	4	0	0	0	1	0	4	3	9	3
Celtic	Total		32	9	1	0	2	0	7	4	42	13
Blackburn Rovers (loan)	2000–01	First Division	11	2	3	0	0	0	—		14	2
Manchester City	2001–02	First Division	25	6	3	1	3	0	—		31	7
Manchester City	2002–03	Premier League	27	1	1	0	1	1	—		29	2
Manchester City	2003–04	Premier League	4	0	0	0	1	0	2	0	7	0
Manchester City	Total		56	7	4	1	5	1	2	0	67	9
Portsmouth	2003–04	Premier League	11	1	4	0	0	0	—		15	1
Portsmouth	2004–05	Premier League	11	1	0	0	2	1	—		13	2
Portsmouth	Total		22	2	4	0	2	1	—		28	3
England & Scotland total			214	34	21	3	21	4	9	4	265	45

== Honours ==
Maccabi Haifa

- Liga Leumit: 1990–91, 1993–94
- Israel State Cup: 1990–91, 1992–93, 1994–95
- Toto Cup: 1993–94

West Ham United

- UEFA Intertoto Cup: 1999

Celtic

- Scottish League Cup: 1999–2000

Blackburn Rovers

- Football League First Division runner-up: 2000–01

Manchester City

- Football League First Division: 2001–02

Individual

- Israeli Footballer of the Year: 1994
- PFA Team of the Year: 2001–02 First Division

== See also ==
- List of Jewish footballers
- List of Jews in sports
