= Marchanno Schultz =

Dutch footballer (born 1972)

Marchanno Schultz (born 17 December 1972) is a Dutch former professional footballer who played as a midfielder for Eredivisie and Eerste Divisie clubs Feyenoord, De Graafschap, N.E.C. and Stormvogels Telstar between 1990 and 2003.
