= Stéphane Mahé =

French footballer (born 1968)

Personal information
- Date of birth: 23 September 1968 (age 58)
- Place of birth: Puteaux, France
- Height: 5 ft 11 in (1.80 m)
- Position: Left-back

Youth career
- Auxerre

Senior career*
| Years | Team | Apps | (Gls) |
| 1986–1995 | Auxerre | ? | |
| 1995–1996 | Paris Saint-Germain | 23 | (0) |
| 1996–1997 | Rennes | 33 | (0) |
| 1997–2001 | Celtic | 76 | (4) |
| 2001–2003 | Hearts | 46 | (2) |
| Total | | 122+ | (6+) |

Managerial career
- 2003–2007: Saint Nazaire
- * Club domestic league appearances and goals

Stéphane Mahé (born 23 September 1968) is a French former professional footballer and former manager of Saint Nazaire FC (now Stade Nazairien).

== Playing career ==
Mahé was born in Puteaux. He started his career in the AJ Auxerre youth academy, graduating to the first team under Guy Roux's tutelage in 1989. He suffered a setback when involved in a car accident in 1992, missing six months through resultant injuries. Upon his return in 1993 he helped Auxerre reach the UEFA Cup semifinals, where they lost to Borussia Dortmund when Mahé missed the final penalty. The following year he earned his first winners' medal, as Auxerre defeated Montpellier 3–0 in the Coupe de France final.

Mahé moved to Paris Saint-Germain in 1995, spending a single season in the capital, during which PSG won the Cup-Winners Cup against Rapid Wien in Brussels. He played in both legs of the second round win over his future employers Celtic. After one season with Stade Rennais he left France, joining Scottish Premier League side Celtic in 1997.

In Glasgow, Mahé collected six trophies and was part of the side which ended arch-rivals Rangers run of consecutive championship wins at nine. He spent the last two years of his career with Hearts, scoring twice against Kilmarnock and Aberdeen, before retiring in 2003.

== Coaching and managerial career ==
Mahe worked as manager of lower-league Saint-Nazaire, his home city, between August 2003 and March 2007.

== Honours ==
- Coupe de France: 1994
- Trophée des Champions: 1995
- Scottish Champion: 1997–98, 2000–01
- Scottish Cup: 2001
- Scottish League Cup: 1997–98, 1999–00, 2000–01
