= Ľubomír Moravčík =

Slovak footballer (born 1965)

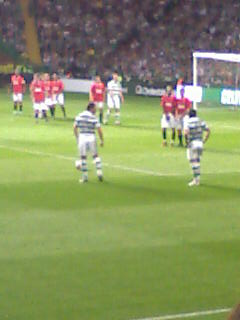
- Moravčík (right) at the John Kennedy testimonial match in 2011

Personal information
- Date of birth: 22 June 1965 (age 61)
- Place of birth: Nitra, Czechoslovakia
- Height: 1.72 m (5 ft 8 in)
- Position: Midfielder

Youth career
- 1976–1983: Nitra

Senior career*
Years	Team	Apps	(Gls)
1983–1990	Nitra	172	(38)
1990–1996	Saint-Étienne	197	(31)
1996–1998	Bastia	33	(8)
1998	MSV Duisburg	5	(0)
1998–2002	Celtic	94	(29)
2002	JEF United Ichihara	2	(0)
Total		503	(106)

International career
1987–1993	Czechoslovakia	44	(6)
1994–2000	Slovakia	37	(6)

Managerial career
- 2004–2005: Ružomberok
- 2005–2008: Slovakia U16
- 2008: ViOn Zlaté Moravce
- 2016–2017: Sereď (assistant)
- 2017: Zvolen (assistant)
- * Club domestic league appearances and goals

Ľubomír Moravčík (born 22 June 1965) is a Slovak football manager and former player. A creative midfielder renowned for his technical ability, he was capable of unleashing powerful, accurate shots, and pinpoint crosses with both feet. He played for teams in Czechoslovakia and Slovakia, France, Germany, Japan, and Scotland. During his time at Scottish club Celtic, Moravčík made 129 appearances, scoring 35 goals and winning two Scottish Premier League titles.

At international level, Moravčík played for Czechoslovakia (42 appearances; seven goals) and Slovakia (38 appearances; six goals). He was a member of the Czechoslovak team at the 1990 FIFA World Cup.

== Club career ==
=== Early career ===
Moravčík began his career at Czechoslovak First League club Plastika Nitra, making his league debut on 16 October 1983 against FK Teplice. He spoke about his early career in an interview with the Slovak podcast, Podcast Výkrok: "I grew up in a very successful generation of Nitra, with whom we became champions of Slovakia in pupils, as younger teenagers we finished third and again became masters as older teenagers. But during my time in Shala, I never dreamed of the first league. However, when Nitra was on the verge of falling out, the club's management decided to give the young players a chance. And that meant my entry into the Premier League scene."

Moravčík went on to make over 170 appearances for the club before leaving 1990 to join French Ligue 1 club Saint-Étienne, where he played over 230 matches. He later moved to Bastia and then MSV Duisburg in Germany.

=== Celtic ===
On 27 October 1998, Moravčík signed for Scottish Premier League side Celtic for a fee of £330,000. The transfer linked him up with fellow Slovak Jozef Vengloš, who was Celtic manager at the time. Initially sceptical of the impact a then-33-year-old footballer could have, Moravčík became a hero in the eyes of the Parkhead faithful, forming an outstanding partnership with Henrik Larsson.

Moravčík made his league debut in a 6–1 victory against Dundee United on 7 November 1998. The same year on 21 November, he scored his first two goals against Old Firm rivals Rangers, which ended in a memorable 5–1 victory.

Moravčík stayed at Celtic Park for a total of four seasons, winning two Scottish championships, one Scottish Cup and two Scottish League Cups. In 2015, Moravčík said of his time in Glasgow: "My favourite time, my most special time, was at Celtic. They said I was a 'gift from God' but it was the opposite – Celtic was a gift from God to me... Celtic is unique." He played his last game for Celtic on 21 April 2002, a 1–1 draw with Rangers in which he assisted Alan Thompson's equaliser and came off as a substitute for Steve Guppy on the 72nd minute.

=== JEF United Ichihara ===
On 4 May 2002, the day before the 2002 Scottish Cup final against Rangers, Moravčík announced his departure from Celtic to join JEF United Ichihara in the J-League, a move that would link him up with Jozef Vengloš, who first brought him to Parkhead in 1998. Moravčík told the Daily Record: "I don't want to play in the last league game at Aberdeen [the following week] so I will be leaving Celtic and Scotland after the Cup final. Because I am going to Japan I will have to start pre-season training at the beginning of June and, before that, I need a holiday." He spent the entire final on the bench as Celtic lost the match 3–2.

Moravčík only made three appearances for JEF United Ichihara due to an ankle injury. After failing to recover, Moravčík announced his retirement from football on 6 September 2002.

== International career ==
Moravčík made a total of 80 appearances for Czechoslovakia and Slovakia between 1987 and 2000. He debuted for the former national team on 11 November 1987 in a 2–0 friendly victory against Wales and scored his first goal in a 3–0 victory against Switzerland during the 1990 FIFA World Cup qualification. Moravčík played at the 1990 FIFA World Cup in Italy, where he was sent off against Germany in the quarter-final in Milan. Germany won the game 1–0. His debut for the newly-established Slovak senior squad occurred on 30 March 1994 in a 2–1 friendly victory against Malta.

== Post-playing career ==
Moravčík began his managerial career with Slovak national U-17 team before being appointed coach of FC ViOn Zlaté Moravce, the team from highest Slovak league, Corgoň Liga. He is also vice-president of the Slovak Football Association and assistant of ŠKF Sereď.

Moravčík also has an engineering degree from the Slovak University of Agriculture, which he gained whilst playing for Nitra. "I think getting a college degree apart from professional sports is more complicated nowadays than when I studied", he said. "The communist regime was proud that the athletes growing up in its establishment had a university degree and were very accommodating. Athletes had individual study plans, various concessions, teachers sometimes turned a blind eye, and were proud to educate a representative of Czechoslovakia. Honestly, I was not an exceptional student, but I tried to come to school honestly and learn. Professors also appreciated my efforts and did not hinder me. Today, graduating from university is extremely challenging for a top athlete with multi-phase daily training, rehabilitation, training and matches. The athlete must define his priorities. I was lucky that, in addition to sports, they also provided us with education. Today is a different time, but I consider the completion of the graduation to be a necessary minimum, this can certainly be managed in addition to sports."

== Style of play ==
A free kick specialist, Moravčík was reminiscent of the old-fashioned inside forward. He was also known for his ability to use both his left and right legs. "It's easy, always notice which foot the player is leading the ball," he told Podcast Vykroč in November 2021. "I never led the ball with my left foot. Yes, I knew how to move it and kick it with my left foot. Through targeted long-term training, I improved my left leg so that I did not distinguish at all when kicking and passing, whether by kicking with my left or right foot. But I always led the ball right."

Henrik Larsson said: "For me, [Moravčík] is one of the best players I ever played with. Still to this day I don't know if he was right-footed or left-footed." Moravčík's two-footedness has also been praised by Pavel Nedvěd.

== Personal life ==
Moravčík acquired French nationality by naturalization on 5 November 1996.

== Career statistics ==
=== Club ===
Appearances and goals by club, season and competition
Club	Season	League			National cup (Note: Includes Czechoslovak Cup, Coupe de France, DFB-Pokal, Scottish Cup, Emperor's Cup)		League cup (Note: Includes Coupe de la Ligue, DFB Ligapokal, Scottish League Cup, J.League Cup)		Continental		Total	
Club	Season	Division	Apps	Goals	Apps	Goals	Apps	Goals	Apps	Goals	Apps	Goals
Plastika Nitra	1983–84	First League	9	0							9	0
Plastika Nitra	1984–85		24	4							24	4
Plastika Nitra	1985–86		29	4							29	4
Plastika Nitra	1986–87	First League	27	7							27	7
Plastika Nitra	1987–88	First League	24	3							24	3
Plastika Nitra	1988–89	First League	30	6							30	6
Plastika Nitra	1989–90	First League	29	14							29	14
Plastika Nitra	Total		172	38							172	38
Saint-Étienne	1990–91	French Division 1	37	7							37	7
Saint-Étienne	1991–92	French Division 1	32	4							32	4
Saint-Étienne	1992–93	French Division 1	34	5							34	5
Saint-Étienne	1993–94	French Division 1	33	4							33	4
Saint-Étienne	1994–95	French Division 1	27	4							27	4
Saint-Étienne	1995–96	French Division 1	34	7							34	7
Saint-Étienne	Total		197	31							197	31
Bastia	1996–97	Division 1	21	6							21	6
Bastia	1997–98	Division 1	12	2							12	2
Bastia	Total		33	8							33	8
MSV Duisburg	1998–99	Bundesliga	5	0							5	0
Celtic	1998–99	Premier League	14	6	3	0	0	0	0	0	17	6
Celtic	1999–00	Premier League	30	8	1	0	4	1	4	0	39	9
Celtic	2000–01	Premier League	27	9	5	1	3	1	5	3	40	14
Celtic	2001–02	Premier League	23	6	1	0	3	0	6	0	33	6
Celtic	Total		94	29	10	1	10	2	15	3	129	35
JEF United Ichihara	2002	J1 League	2	0	0	0	1	0	-		3	0
Career total			450	98	10	1	11	2	15	3	486	104

=== International ===
Appearances and goals by national team and year
National team	Year	Apps	Goals
Czechoslovakia	1987	1	0
Czechoslovakia	1988	5	0
Czechoslovakia	1989	8	1
Czechoslovakia	1990	12	1
Czechoslovakia	1991	6	2
Czechoslovakia	1992	6	1
Czechoslovakia	1993	6	1
Total		44	6
Slovakia	1994	6	2
Slovakia	1995	8	0
Slovakia	1996	5	1
Slovakia	1997	3	0
Slovakia	1998	10	3
Slovakia	2000	5	0
Total		37	6
Career total		81	12

- Moravčík's team's score listed first, score column indicates score after each Moravčík goal.

International goals by Ľubomír Moravčík
No.	Team	Cap	Date	Venue	Opponent	Score	Result	Competition	Ref
1	Czechoslovakia	13	25 October 1989	Stadion Letná, Prague, Czechoslovakia	Switzerland	3–0	3–0	1990 FIFA World Cup qualification	
2	Czechoslovakia	26	14 November 1990	Stadion Evžena Rošického, Prague, Czechoslovakia	Spain	3–2	3–2	UEFA Euro 1992 qualifying	
3	Czechoslovakia	27	27 March 1991	Andrův stadion, Olomouc, Czechoslovakia	Poland	2–0	4–0	Friendly	
4	Czechoslovakia	31	25 September 1991	Ullevaal Stadion, Oslo, Norway	Norway	2–1	3–2	Friendly	
5	Czechoslovakia	35	19 August 1991	Tehelné pole, Bratislava, Czechoslovakia	Austria	2–2	2–2	Friendly	
6	Czechoslovakia	39	24 March 1993	Tsirio Stadium, Limassol, Cyprus	Cyprus	1–0	1–1	1994 FIFA World Cup qualification	
7	Slovakia	2	20 April 1994	Tehelné pole, Bratislava, Slovakia	Croatia	4–1	4–1	Friendly	
8	Slovakia	5	12 October 1994	Ramat Gan Stadium, Ramat Gan, Israel	Israel	1–0	2–2	UEFA Euro 1996 qualifying	
9	Slovakia	18	31 August 1996	Svangaskarð, Toftir, Faroe Islands	Faroe Islands	1–0	2–1	1998 FIFA World Cup qualification	
10	Slovakia	24	6 February 1998	Tsirio Stadium, Limassol, Cyprus	Slovenia	1–1	1–1	Friendly	
11	Slovakia	25	7 February 1998	Tsirio Stadium, Limassol, Cyprus	Iceland	2–0	2–1	Friendly	
12	Slovakia	30	5 September 1998	Štadión Lokomotívy, Košice, Slovakia	Azerbaijan	3–0	3–0	UEFA Euro 2000 qualifying	

== Honours ==
Bastia

- UEFA Intertoto Cup: 1997

Celtic

- Scottish Premier League: 2000–01, 2001–02
- Scottish Cup: 2001
- Scottish League Cup: 2000, 2001

Individual

- Czechoslovak Footballer of the Year: 1992
- Slovak Footballer of the Year: 2001
