= Rafael Scheidt =

Brazilian footballer (born 1976)

Personal information
- Full name: Rafael Scheidt
- Date of birth: February 10, 1976 (age 50)
- Place of birth: Porto Alegre, Brazil
- Height: 1.83 m (6 ft 0 in)
- Position: Defender

Youth career
- Grêmio

Senior career*
Years	Team	Apps	(Gls)
1995–1996	Grêmio	7	(0)
1997	Kawasaki Frontale	26	(5)
1998–1999	Grêmio	39	(2)
1999–2002	Celtic	3	(0)
2000–2002	→ Corinthians (loan)	35	(1)
2003–2004	Atlético Mineiro	35	(2)
2004–2006	Botafogo	73	(1)
2007–2008	Shaanxi Baorong	38	(2)
Total		256	(13)

International career^{‡}
1999	Brazil	3	(0)
- * Club domestic league appearances and goals as of January 3, 2008 ‡ National team caps and goals as of January 3, 2008

Rafael Felipe Scheidt (born February 10, 1976, in Porto Alegre, Brazil) is a retired Brazilian footballer. He was signed by John Barnes, manager of Celtic from Grêmio for £5 million and failed to make an impact. Plagued by injury and finding it hard to settle, he started one game in the 1999–00 season against St Johnstone and was let out on loan to Corinthians by new manager Martin O'Neill after just five appearances. Indeed, Scheidt later admitted that following an unimpressive showing in a pre-season friendly O'Neill had told him: "I like footballers who are not like you", further adding: "I like footballers who play well". The Guardian newspaper called Scheidt the second worst transfer in the history of football, behind Steve Daley, in an article published in 2001.

Scheidt's loan spell at Corinthians ended in 2002, and he maintained his hope of making it at Celtic, informing the Sunday Herald: "I want this year to be known as the Scheidt year". However, he no longer met UK work permit requirements and Celtic paid off the remainder of his contract. He then returned to Brazil, joining Atlético Mineiro. A year later, he signed for Botafogo, before being released by them in 2006.

Scheidt won three caps for Brazil in 1999, shortly prior to his transfer to Celtic.
