= Olivier Tébily =

Ivorian footballer (born 1975)

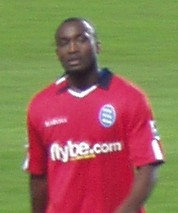
- In Birmingham City colours, 2005

Personal information
- Full name: Olivier Tébily
- Date of birth: 19 December 1975 (age 50)
- Place of birth: Abidjan, Ivory Coast
- Height: 1.85 m (6 ft 1 in)
- Position: Defender

Senior career*
Years	Team	Apps	(Gls)
1993–1998	Niort	91	(5)
1998–1999	Châteauroux	23	(1)
1999	Sheffield United	8	(0)
1999–2002	Celtic	38	(0)
2002–2008	Birmingham City	83	(0)
2008	Toronto FC	4	(0)
Total		247	(6)

International career
1999–2004	Ivory Coast	18	(0)
- * Club domestic league appearances and goals

Olivier Tébily (born 19 December 1975) is a former professional footballer who played as a defender. A French citizen, he won 18 full international caps for his native Ivory Coast national team. He played in the top level league in four countries: for Châteauroux in Division 1, for Celtic in the Scottish Premier League, for Birmingham City in the English Premier League, and for Toronto FC in Major League Soccer.

== Early life ==
Tébily was born in Abidjan, Ivory Coast, and raised in France. As a child, he was an Arsenal fan. He became a naturalised French citizen.

== Career ==
Tébily began his career as a junior at Division 2 club Niort, where he spent several years. In January 1998, he moved to Châteauroux, promoted that season to Division 1. While his contribution failed to prevent their relegation, it clearly attracted favourable attention, because the following March, Steve Bruce signed him for English club Sheffield United for a fee of £200,000.

His Sheffield United career proved brief. His seventh game for the club was watched by Kenny Dalglish, and on Dalglish's appointment as Director of Football at Celtic in June 1999, he was quick to bring Tébily to the club for a fee of £1.25 million. On 8 July, he became manager John Barnes' third signing.

=== Celtic ===
Tébily marked his first Celtic appearance, in a pre-season game against Leeds United, by scoring an own goal, an early indication of the sometimes erratic nature of his performances which earned him the nickname "Bombscare" from the Celtic fans. The next pre-season game, this time against Newcastle United, saw him redeem himself by scoring at the right end, and also by a good defensive performance against Alan Shearer.

He held down a regular starting spot until Christmas, when he joined up with the Ivory Coast national team for the 2000 African Cup of Nations. His return from his country's unsuccessful campaign was delayed when the squad was detained in a military camp in the Ivory Coast, described by the authorities as a necessary move to ensure the players' safety in light of the public reaction to their failure to reach the knockout stage of the competition. Tébily and the remainder of the squad were able to make their way home following intervention from FIFA president Sepp Blatter.

His next appearance for Celtic was in the shock Scottish Cup defeat at home to Inverness Caledonian Thistle which provoked the "Super Caley go ballistic, Celtic are atrocious" headline in The Scottish Sun and resulted in the sacking of John Barnes. Dalglish took over as manager until the end of the season, during which time Tébily appeared irregularly.

In the 2000–01 season, new manager Martin O'Neill gave him only three first-team starts. He began the next season in the first team and playing well, but lost his place once Bobo Baldé regained fitness. He still made enough appearances to qualify for an SPL winners' medal and received an unlikely nomination for the 2001 African Footballer of the Year award.

Tébily wanted to play regularly, which was not going to happen at Celtic, so it was considered best for all parties if he was made available for transfer. On 22 March 2002, he resumed his association with manager Steve Bruce when he moved to Birmingham City, then playing in the Championship, for a fee of £700,000. Celtic clearly thought he had potential for improvement, as they had a sell-on clause included in the deal. He had scored twice during his spell at Celtic, once in a UEFA Cup tie with Cwmbran Town and another in the 8–0 thrashing of Stirling Albion in the League Cup.

=== Birmingham City ===
Bruce had taken over at Birmingham some three months previously and was in the process of rebuilding the team with a view to reaching the play-offs. He saw Tébily's major attributes as his size, strength and pace; a quality which soon became apparent was his whole-hearted commitment to the cause, as exemplified by his performance in the play-off semifinal against Millwall. Playing in an unaccustomed central midfield position, he man-marked Tim Cahill, later of Everton and Australia, out of the game, and won the ball from Stuart Nethercott with a full-blooded tackle having earlier lost his boot. In that season, Tébily never finished on the losing side at club level, either for Celtic or for Birmingham.

Tébily played regularly in Birmingham's first Premier League season until 21 December, when he damaged his medial knee ligaments in the first 20 minutes of the match against Charlton Athletic. In keeping with his "hard-man" image, he finished the game, but the injury proved serious enough to keep him out for the rest of the season.

Returning fit at the start of the 2003–04 Premier League season, Tébily found himself no longer first choice, though his versatility made him the manager's preferred defensive substitute. For the next couple of years, he was used irregularly. Coach Mark Bowen cited a lack of confidence, and a long-standing problem with concentration, as leading to inconsistency of performance; though the player's own determination to combat the problem led him to encourage the coaching staff to keep shouting at him during the game to maintain his concentration levels. In addition, he underwent laser eye surgery to deal with the problems caused by wearing contact lenses for football. He sometimes struggled badly against quick, tricky players, but always gave of his best when given an opportunity.

In September 2005, he signed a new three-year contract, reflecting his value to the squad despite not having been a first-choice player at any time since his injury in 2002. Restored to the starting lineup as a replacement for Mario Melchiot, his determination and enthusiasm, typified in a man-of-the-match performance against Chelsea, did much to lift the team and supporters during their ultimately unsuccessful fight against relegation. He began the 2006–07 season in the starting eleven, but Radhi Jaïdi, Bruno Ngotty, Martin Taylor and Stephen Kelly were all preferred, and Tébily made his final first-team appearance for Birmingham in October 2006. His contract, which was due to expire at the end of the season, was paid up on 14 January 2008, and he became a free agent after nearly six years at the club.

=== Toronto FC ===
After a period spent training with them, Tébily signed for Major League Soccer team Toronto FC on 24 April 2008. Head coach John Carver believed his team would be improved by the player's versatility, as shown by his ability to play both in the centre of defence and on the right. He played four matches for the club, but an ankle injury disrupted his career, and he was released on 31 July 2008, because he wanted to be closer to his family in France.

== International career ==
According to RSSSF, Tébily represented the France national under-21 football team ("Les Espoirs") at the 1997 Mediterranean Games, being sent off in a 3–0 defeat by Greece. However Le Télégramme reported that Tébily had been withdrawn from the squad on the eve of the tournament, to be replaced by Stéphane Pichot of Laval.

== Personal life ==
After retirement, Tébily decided to pursue this new chapter of life to realize his long time dream to become the first African wine grower and produce his own cognac Source deux vie as a tribute to his country.

== Honours ==
Birmingham City

- Football League First Division play-offs: 2002
