= Brian McColligan =

Scottish footballer

Brian McColligan (born 31 October 1980) is a Scottish footballer who played as a midfielder.

McColligan's footballing career started when he was a seventeen-year-old, in the youth ranks of Celtic, where he was a squad member from 1997 to 2001. Having made one appearance for Celtic, during the 1999–2000 season, he was signed on loan by Stenhousemuir halfway through the 2000–01 season. A successful three-month spell saw him score one goal, against future club Queen of the South, from deep in midfield. Subsequently, McColligan's career was to take him away from Celtic Park and to Clydebank, who he joined in September 2001. At Clydebank he scored once against Morton.

In the close season of 2002 McColligan signed for Queen of the South, who had just been promoted from Division Two. This was the perfect opportunity for the team to build on the squad with which they wished to consolidate their league status, and McColligan, along with then-teammates Eric Paton and Martin Glancy, was to prove part of the team's plans. Queen of the South were, in that same season, to win the Scottish League Challenge Cup, with McColligan a member of the victorious final team.

McColligan lasted in the Queen of the South team until November 2005. Immediately after what was to prove his final game, a 5–2 defeat to Hamilton Academical, in which he was sent off, McColligan signed for Alloa Athletic, in an attempt to save the team from relegation. While Alloa finished second-bottom in the 2005–06 table, they won the playoff final against Berwick Rangers, consolidating their position in the Second Division.

While Alloa continue to occupy the lower half of Division Two, McColligan struggles for goal-scoring form, something which has eluded him since his days at Queen of the South. McColligan remains a tough-tackling midfielder who gels the team together with his attacking attitude as much as his popularity with the fans.

In July 2007 McColligan left Alloa to sign for Bathgate Thistle. He won the Scottish Junior Cup in 2008 with Thistle, after the team defeated Cumnock Juniors 2–1 at Rugby Park.
