= Stéphane Bonnes =

French footballer (born 1978)

Personal information
- Full name: Stéphane Bonnes
- Date of birth: February 26, 1978 (age 48)
- Place of birth: Mulhouse, France
- Position: Midfielder

Senior career*
Years	Team	Apps	(Gls)
1998–1999	Mulhouse F.C		
1999–2003	Celtic	0	(0)
2003–2004	Partick Thistle	20	(1)
- * Club domestic league appearances and goals

Stephane Bonnes (born February 26, 1978) is a former footballer who played for Mulhouse F.C, Celtic, Partick Thistle and Saint-Louis-Neuweg. Bonnes was signed for Celtic by John Barnes on 29 July 1999 but despite scoring in a pre-season game against HamKam, he never played a single first team game.

He moved to Partick Thistle on 9 June 2003 and spent one season with the club, making 24 appearances and scoring twice. His goals came against Hamilton Academical in the Scottish Cup and Kilmarnock in the league.
