= Bobby Petta =

Dutch footballer (born 1974)

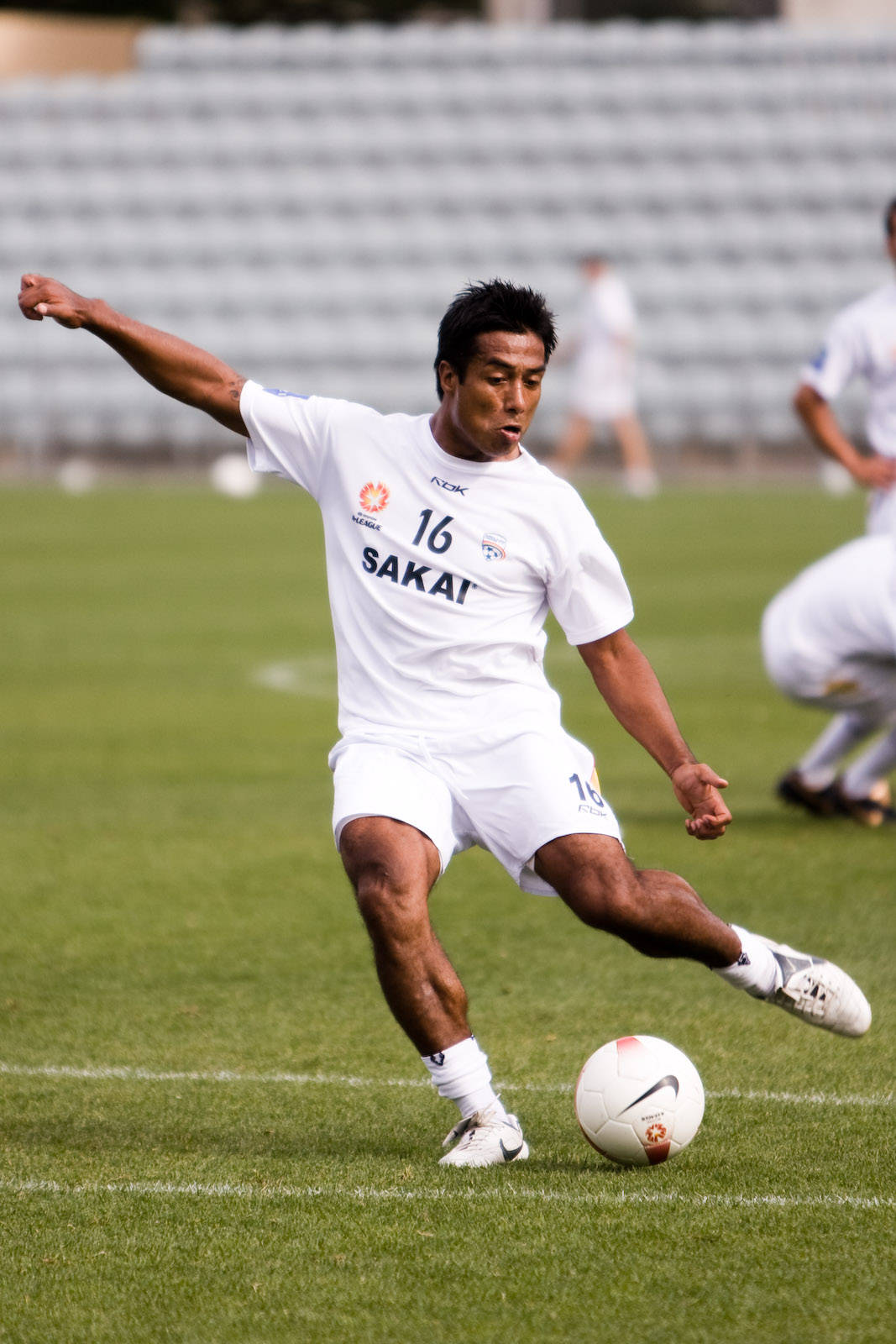
- Petta with Adelaide United in 2008

Personal information
- Full name: Alfred Manuel Petta
- Date of birth: 6 August 1974 (age 52)
- Place of birth: Rotterdam, Netherlands
- Height: 1.70 m (5 ft 7 in)
- Position: Left winger

Youth career
- Feyenoord

Senior career*
Years	Team	Apps	(Gls)
1993–1996	Feyenoord	1	(0)
1993–1994	→ Dordrecht '90 (loan)	9	(0)
1994–1995	→ RKC Waalwijk (loan)	21	(1)
1996–1999	Ipswich Town	71	(9)
1999–2004	Celtic	52	(4)
2004	→ Fulham (loan)	8	(0)
2005	Darlington	12	(1)
2005–2006	Bradford City	27	(4)
2006–2008	Adelaide United	19	(1)
2008	Para Hills Knights	4	(0)
2008	Sydney FC	9	(0)
2009	Heidelberg United	9	(0)
2009	Adelaide Croatia	2	(0)
2016–?	Rossvale		
Total		244	(16)
- * Club domestic league appearances and goals

Alfred Manuel "Bobby" Petta (born 6 August 1974) is a Dutch former professional footballer who played as a left winger.

Formed at Feyenoord, he spent most of his career in Britain, most notably with Ipswich Town of the Football League First Division and Celtic of the Scottish Premier League. He also had a loan at Fulham in the Premier League in 2004, and several years in the Australian A-League with Adelaide United and Sydney FC.

== Club career ==
Born in Rotterdam, Netherlands, Petta's early playing career was with Feyenoord, from the age of 13 to 21, but he never became a regular in the first team during that period, having loan spells at Dordrecht'90 and RKC Waalwijk.

Petta signed for English First Division club Ipswich Town in 1996. In July 1999 he moved on a free transfer to Celtic of the Scottish Premier League. He scored four times during his spell at Celtic, but scored no goals in the league. His first goal came against Ayr United in the Scottish League Cup in October 1999. He also scored against Jeunesse Esch in 2000–01 UEFA Cup qualifying and another against Ajax in 2001–02 UEFA Champions League qualifying. His fourth and final Celtic goal came against Alloa Athletic in the Scottish Cup in January 2002.

Petta had a number of injuries during his time at Celtic; Celtic won the domestic treble in 2001 but after picking up an injury in the 2001 Scottish League Cup Final Petta missed the 2001 Scottish Cup Final. He also missed the 2003 UEFA Cup Final as a result of injury. Due to the injuries and falling out of favour with manager Martin O'Neill Petta only made one appearance for the Celtic first team between November 2002 and his departure from the club in late 2004; his sole appearance coming against MTK Hungaria in a UEFA Champions League qualifier.

In January 2004, Petta returned to England, signing with Fulham of the Premier League on loan for the rest of the season. Upon his return to Celtic after the loan he had a trial at Leeds United. As the 2004–05 season began Petta surprisingly made some of the first team match day squads, but did not play. Shortly afterwards he was released by Celtic and as a free agent he joined Darlington of League Two. On his debut on 5 February, he scored the only goal away to Bury. In June 2005 he signed a two-year deal with Bradford City in League One, and again scored on his debut in a 2–0 win at Hartlepool United on 6 August.

In July 2006, Petta was given permission to leave Bradford and move to Australia, where he failed a trial at Brisbane Roar before signing for Adelaide United of the A-League. Petta signed for South Australian side Para Hills Knights on 11 June 2008.

He was invited to have a trial with A-League club Sydney FC in late July, and join up with his former coach at Adelaide, John Kosmina. He signed a contract with Sydney until the end of the 2008–09 season as a replacement for Michael Enfield, who was placed on the long-term injury list. After the season finished, Petta was released. He signed for Heidelberg United in the Victorian Premier League for the 2009 season.

In June 2011, Petta held talks with new Alloa Athletic manager Paul Hartley, with a view to resurrecting his playing career with the Scottish Third Division side. Scottish Junior club, Rossvale announced the signing of Glasgow-based Petta in February 2016.

== International career ==
Petta was called up by manager Louis van Gaal for the Netherlands national team in February 2001, ahead of a friendly against Turkey, but had to withdraw through injury. He was called up again in August 2001 for a friendly against England.

== Personal life ==
In December 2002, during the Celtic team Christmas party, Petta and fellow players Joos Valgaeren, Johan Mjallby and Neil Lennon ended up in police custody after a Daily Record photographer alleged they had stolen or damaged two cameras worth £12,000. Lennon was released without charge while the other three spent the night in jail.

In August 2011, Petta was cast as an extra in the film World War Z, which was being shot in Glasgow.

Petta was declared bankrupt after retiring from football. He was one of several contemporary players of Celtic or their rivals Rangers to meet that fate in the 2010s.

From 2017, Petta worked as a house music disc jockey, having pursued it as a hobby in the 1990s.

== Career statistics ==
Appearances and goals by club, season and competition
Club	Season	League			Cup		Continental		Other		Total	
Club	Season	Division	Apps	Goals	Apps	Goals	Apps	Goals	Apps	Goals	Apps	Goals
Feyenoord	1992–93	Eredivisie	1	0	0	0	–		–		1	0
RKC Waalwijk (loan)	1994–95	Eredivisie	21	1	1	1	–		–		22	2
Adelaide United	2006–07	A-League	14	1			2	0	1	0	17	1
Adelaide United	2007–08	A-League	5	0			–		–		5	0
Adelaide United	Total		19	1			2	0	1	0	22	1
Sydney FC	2008–09	A-League	9	0			–		–		9	0
Career total			50	2	1	1	2	0	1	0	54	3

== Honours ==
Dordrecht

- Eerste Divisie: 1993–94

Celtic:

- Scottish Premier League: 2000–01, 2001–02
- Scottish League Cup: 2000–01
