= 1999–2000 Scottish League Cup =

1999–2000 Co-operative Insurance Cup
Tournament details
- Country: Scotland

Final positions
- Champions: Celtic
- Runners-up: Aberdeen

The 1999–2000 Scottish League Cup was the 54th staging of the Scotland's second most prestigious football knockout competition, also known for sponsorship reasons as the CIS Insurance Cup.

The competition was won by Celtic, who defeated Aberdeen 2–0 in the Final.

== First round ==
Home team	Score	Away team
Albion Rovers (4)	0–3	Clyde (3)
Brechin City (4)	0–2	Dumbarton (4)
Clydebank (2)	1–2	East Stirlingshire (4)
Cowdenbeath (4)	0–2	Livingston (2)
East Fife (4)	2–2	Stirling Albion (3)
Montrose (4)	1–2	Hamilton Academical (3)
Partick Thistle (3)	0–2	Alloa Athletic (3)
Queen of the South (3)	1–0	Arbroath (3)
Queen's Park (4)	2–1	Berwick Rangers (4)
Ross County (3)	2–1	Forfar Athletic (3)
Stenhousemuir (3)	1–3	Inverness Caledonian Thistle (2)
Stranraer (3)	0–1	Raith Rovers (2)

== Second round ==
Home team	Score	Away team
Greenock Morton	1–3	Alloa Athletic
Inverness Caledonian Thistle	2–0	St Mirren
East Fife	(p)2–2	Airdrieonians
Dundee	4–0	Dumbarton
Clyde	2–2(p)	Hibernian
Ayr United	2–1	Hamilton
Aberdeen	1–0	Livingston
Raith Rovers	2–2	Motherwell
Queen of the South	1–3	Hearts
East Stirlingshire	0–2	Falkirk
Dunfermline Athletic	4–0	Queen's Park
Dundee United	3–1	Ross County

== Third round ==
Home team	Score	Away team
Ayr United	0–4	Celtic
Aberdeen	(p)1–1	Falkirk
Alloa Athletic	1–3	Dundee
East Fife	0–2	Hearts
Inverness Caledonian Thistle	0–1	Motherwell
Kilmarnock	3–2	Hibernian
Rangers	1–0	Dunfermline Athletic
St Johnstone	1–2	Dundee United

== Quarter-finals ==
Home team	Score	Away team
Kilmarnock	1–0	Hearts
Aberdeen	1–0	Rangers
Celtic	1–0	Dundee
Dundee United	3–2	Motherwell

== Semi-finals ==
13 February 2000

Aberdeen	1–0	Dundee United
Stavrum 78'	Report

Dens Park, Dundee
Attendance: 9,500
Referee: John Rowbotham

16 February 2000

Celtic	1–0	Kilmarnock
Moravcik 66'	Report

Hampden Park, Glasgow
Attendance: 22,926
Referee: Jim McCluskey

== Final ==
19 March 2000

Aberdeen	0–2	Celtic
		Riseth 15'; Johnson 58'

Hampden Park, Glasgow
Attendance: 50,073
Referee: Kenny Clark
