= 1998–99 Celtic F.C. season =

Celtic
1998–99 season
- Manager: Jozef Vengloš
- Stadium: Celtic Park
- Scottish Premier League: 2nd
- Scottish Cup: Runners-up
- Scottish League Cup: Third round
- Champions League: Second qualifying round
- UEFA Cup: Second round
- Top goalscorer: League: Henrik Larsson (29); All: Henrik Larsson (38)
Home colours	Away colours

The 1998–99 season was the 105th season of competitive football by Celtic. Celtic competed in the Scottish Premier League, UEFA Cup, Scottish League Cup and the Scottish Cup.

As defending league champions, they were now managed by Slovak coach Jozef Venglos following the resignation of Wim Jansen. However, they finished runners-up behind Rangers this season and also lost to them in the Scottish Cup final.

== Summary ==
Season 1998–99 saw Celtic finish second in the league six points behind the winners, Rangers. They reached the final of the Scottish Cup losing to Rangers, the third round of the League Cup losing to Airdrieonians, the second qualifying round of the Champions League and the second round of the UEFA Cup, losing to FC Zürich.

== Transfers ==
=== In ===
Date	Player	From	Fee
21 September 1998	(Norway) Vidar Riseth	(Austria) LASK Linz	£1,400,000
28 October 1998	(Slovakia) Ľubomír Moravčík	(Germany) MSV Duisburg	£370,000
13 November 1998	(England) Tony Warner	(England) Liverpool	Loan
18 November 1998	(Sweden) Johan Mjällby	(Sweden) AIK	£1,400,000
2 December 1998	(Australia) Mark Viduka	(Croatia) Dinamo Zagreb	£3,000,000
20 March 1999	(Scotland) Scott Marshall	(England) Arsenal	Loan

=== Out ===
Date	Player	To	Fee
21 September 1998	(Scotland) Malky Mackay	(England) Norwich City	£350,000
5 February 1999	(Scotland) John Paul McBride	(Scotland) St Johnstone	£150,000
6 February 1999	(Scotland) David Hannah	(Scotland) Dundee United	£600,000
25 March 1999	(Scotland) Darren Jackson	(Scotland) Heart of Midlothian	£450,000
31 March 1999	(Scotland) Brian McLaughlin	(Scotland) Dundee United	Loan

- Expenditure: ▼£6,170,000
- Income: ▲£1,550,000
- Total loss/gain: ▼£4,620,000

== Results and fixtures ==
Win Draw Loss

=== Friendlies ===
9 July 1998 Friendly	Hollandia	2–1	Celtic	Juliana Sportpark
	Veltmeyer 50'; Zaoudi 83'		Blinker 11'	Referee: Van Dongen

10 July 1998 Friendly	ASWH	1–5	Celtic	Sportpark Schildman
	Koster 71' (Penalty)		Elliot 14', 57'; Brattbakk 32', 55'; Stubbs 49'	Attendance: 1,000

18 July 1998 Ray Montgomerie Testimonial	Kilmarnock	1–2	Celtic	Rugby Park
	Wright 19'		Larsson 35'; Donnelly 40'	Attendance: 6,860; Referee: McCluskey

25 July 1998 Friendly	Celtic	2–1	Tottenham Hotspur	Celtic Park
	Blinker 43'; Jackson 62'		Armstrong 11'	Attendance: 53,872; Referee: McCluskey

4 August 1998 Jimmy Phillips Testimonial	Bolton Wanderers	1–1	Celtic	Reebok Stadium
	Sellars 33'		McNamara 87'	Attendance: 17,479; Referee: Lomas

8 August 1998 Friendly	Celtic	0–1	Liverpool	Celtic Park
			Leonhardsen 36'	Attendance: 59,727; Referee: Rowbotham

=== Premier League ===
1 August 1998 Premier League	Celtic	5–0	Dunfermline Athletic	Glasgow
15:00 GMT	Burley 45', 84', 89'; Donnelly 58'; McKinlay 83'			Stadium: Celtic Park; Attendance: 59,377; Referee: Kenny Clark

16 August 1998 Premier League	Aberdeen	3–2	Celtic	Aberdeen
18:05 BST	Perry 39'; Blinker 56' (o.g.); Hignett 59'		Larsson 69', 90+2' (pen.)	Stadium: Pittodrie Stadium; Attendance: 16,440; Referee: Willie Young

22 August 1998 Premier League	Celtic	2–1	Dundee United	Glasgow
15:00 BST	Burley 80'; Burchill 83'		Winters 31'	Stadium: Celtic Park; Attendance: 59,133; Referee: Alan Freeland

29 August 1998 Premier League	Dundee	1–1	Celtic	Dundee
15:00 BST	Annand 90+1' (pen.)		Burley 69'	Stadium: Dens Park; Attendance: 9,853; Referee: Garry Mitchell

12 September 1998 Premier League	Celtic	1–1	Kilmarnock	Glasgow
15:00 BST	Blinker 29'		Vareille 50'	Stadium: Celtic Park; Attendance: 58,567; Referee: Hugh Dallas

20 September 1998 Premier League	Rangers	0–0	Celtic	Glasgow
18:05 BST				Stadium: Ibrox Stadium; Attendance: 50,026; Referee: Stuart Dougal

23 September 1998 Premier League	Celtic	0–1	St Johnstone	Glasgow
19:45 BST			Dasović 15'	Stadium: Celtic Park; Attendance: 55,745; Referee: Mike McCurry

26 September 1998 Premier League	Celtic	1–1	Hearts	Glasgow
15:00 GMT	Donnelly 32'		Hamilton 53'	Stadium: Celtic Park; Attendance: 59,283; Referee: Willie Young

3 October 1998 Premier League	Motherwell	1–2	Celtic	Motherwell
15:00 BST	Adams 90+1'		Brattbakk 29'; Lambert 45+2'	Stadium: Fir Park; Attendance: 12,103; Referee: Jim McCluskey

17 October 1998 Premier League	Dunfermline Athletic	2–2	Celtic	Dunfermline
15:00 BST	Britton 13' (pen.); French 27'		Larsson 16'; Brattbakk 37'	Stadium: East End Park; Attendance: 10,968; Referee: Hugh Dallas

24 October 1998 Premier League	Celtic	2–0	Aberdeen	Glasgow
15:00 GMT	Donnelly 12', 70'			Stadium: Celtic Park; Attendance: 59,963; Referee: Jim McCluskey

31 October 1998 Premier League	Kilmarnock	2–0	Celtic	Kilmarnock
15:00 GMT	Roberts 55'; Mitchell 70'			Stadium: Rugby Park; Attendance: 16,695; Referee: John Rowbotham

7 November 1998 Premier League	Celtic	6–1	Dundee	Glasgow
15:00 GMT	Larsson 9' (pen.), 18' (pen.), 58'; Burchill 27', 53'; Donnelly 65'		Annand 21'	Stadium: Celtic Park; Attendance: 58,974; Referee: Stuart Dougal

14 November 1998 Premier League	St Johnstone	2–1	Celtic	Perth
15:00 GMT	Simão 45+1'; McAnespie 78'		Larsson 51'	Stadium: McDiarmid Park; Attendance: 9,762; Referee: Eric Martindale

21 November 1998 Premier League	Celtic	5–1	Rangers	Glasgow
15:00 GMT	Moravčík 11', 49'; Larsson 51', 57'; Burchill 89'		van Bronckhorst 53'	Stadium: Celtic Park; Attendance: 59,783; Referee: Willie Young

28 November 1998 Premier League	Celtic	2–0	Motherwell	Glasgow
15:00 GMT	Larsson 40'; O'Donnell 46'			Stadium: Celtic Park; Attendance: 59,227; Referee: Kenny Clark

6 December 1998 Premier League	Hearts	2–1	Celtic	Edinburgh
18:05 GMT	Adam 37', 49'		O'Donnell 74'	Stadium: Tynecastle Stadium; Attendance: 17,334; Referee: Mike McCurry

12 December 1998 Premier League	Dundee United	1–1	Celtic	Dundee
15:00 GMT	Zetterlund 49'		Larsson 85'	Stadium: Tannadice Park; Attendance: 11,612; Referee: Jim McCluskey

19 December 1998 Premier League	Celtic	5–0	Dunfermline Athletic	Glasgow
15:00 GMT	Larsson 55', 57' (pen.); Mjällby 60'; Moravčík 63', 72'			Stadium: Celtic Park; Attendance: 59,024; Referee: Bobby Orr

27 December 1998 Premier League	Dundee	0–3	Celtic	Dundee
18:05 GMT			O'Donnell 3'; Riseth 12'; Douglas 56' (o.g.)	Stadium: Dens Park; Attendance: 10,043; Referee: Willie Young

3 January 1999 Premier League	Rangers	2–2	Celtic	Glasgow
18:05 GMT	Amato 45+2'; Wallace 58'		Stubbs 39'; Larsson 66'	Stadium: Ibrox Stadium; Attendance: 50,059; Referee: Jim McCluskey

31 January 1999 Premier League	Celtic	5–0	St Johnstone	Glasgow
18:05 GMT	Brattbakk 6', 76', 78'; Moravčík 19'; Larsson 31'			Stadium: Celtic Park; Attendance: 59,746; Referee: John Rowbotham

6 February 1999 Premier League	Celtic	3–0	Hearts	Glasgow
15:00 GMT	Larsson 21', 24', 66' (pen.)			Stadium: Celtic Park; Attendance: 59,844; Referee: Stuart Dougal

17 February 1999 Premier League	Celtic	1–0	Kilmarnock	Kilmarnock
19:45 GMT	Riseth 49'			Stadium: Celtic Park; Attendance: 59,220; Referee: Jim McCluskey

21 February 1999 Premier League	Motherwell	1–7	Celtic	Motherwell
18:05 GMT	Brannan 26'		Larsson 22' (pen.), 65', 86', 87'; Moravčík 30'; Burley 74'; Burchill 85'	Stadium: Fir Park; Attendance: 11,963; Referee: Kenny Clark

27 February 1999 Premier League	Celtic	2–1	Dundee United	Glasgow
15:00 GMT	Burley 74'; Larsson 78'		Dodds 25'	Stadium: Celtic Park; Attendance: 59,902; Referee: Mike McCurry

14 March 1999 Premier League	Aberdeen	1–5	Celtic	Aberdeen
18:05 GMT	Winters 79'		Viduka 26', 47'; Larsson 69', 73'; Burley 89'	Stadium: Pittodrie Stadium; Attendance: 16,825; Referee: Willie Young

21 March 1999 Premier League	Kilmarnock	0–0	Celtic	Kilmarnock
18:05 GMT				Stadium: Rugby Park; Attendance: 14,472; Referee: Mike McCurry

3 April 1999 Premier League	Celtic	5–0	Dundee	Glasgow
15:00 GMT	Larsson 7', 66' (pen.); Burley 32'; Viduka 41'; Blinker 70'			Stadium: Celtic Park; Attendance: 59,269; Referee: Dougie McDonald

14 April 1999 Premier League	Hearts	2–4	Celtic	Edinburgh
19:45 GMT	Adam 27', 48'		Riseth 2'; Blinker 7'; Viduka 29', 52'	Stadium: Tynecastle Park; Attendance: 16,388; Referee: Stuart Dougal

17 April 1999 Premier League	Celtic	1–0	Motherwell	Glasgow
15:00 GMT	Larsson 63' (pen.)			Stadium: Celtic Park; Attendance: 59,588; Referee: Jim McCluskey

24 April 1999 Premier League	St Johnstone	1–0	Celtic	Perth
15:00 GMT	O'Halloran 55'			Stadium: McDiarmid Park; Attendance: 10,393; Referee: Kenny Clark

2 May 1999 Premier League	Celtic	0–3	Rangers	Glasgow
18:05 GMT			McCann 12', 76'; Albertz 44' (pen.)	Stadium: Celtic Park; Attendance: 59,918; Referee: Hugh Dallas

8 May 1999 Premier League	Dunfermline Athletic	1–2	Celtic	Dunfermline
15:00 GMT	Coyle 83'		Johnson 2', 44'	Stadium: East End Park; Attendance: 8,848; Referee: Willie Young

15 May 1999 Premier League	Celtic	3–2	Aberdeen	Glasgow
15:00 GMT	Blinker 1'; Johnson 60'; Burchill 88'		Mayer 55'; Perry 39'	Stadium: Celtic Park; Attendance: 59,138; Referee: Alan Freeland

23 May 1999 Premier League	Dundee United	1–2	Celtic	Dundee
12:00 GMT	Dodds 59' (pen.)		Burchill 34', 35'	Stadium: Tannadice Park; Attendance: 10,062; Referee: Stuart Dougal

=== Champions League ===
22 July 1998 First Qualifying Round 1st leg	Celtic (Scotland)	0–0	(Republic of Ireland) St Patrick's Athletic	Glasgow
19:45 GMT				Stadium: Celtic Park; Attendance: 56,685; Referee: Bohdan Benedik

29 July 1998 First Qualifying Round 2nd leg	St Patrick's Athletic (Republic of Ireland)	0–2 (0–2 agg.)	(Scotland) Celtic	Dublin
19:45 GMT		Report	Brattbakk 12'; Larsson 72'	Stadium: Richmond Park; Attendance: 8,929; Referee: Mikko Vuorela

12 August 1998 Second Qualifying Round 1st leg	Celtic (Scotland)	1–0	(Croatia) Dinamo Zagreb	Glasgow
19:45	Jackson 50'	Report		Stadium: Celtic Park; Attendance: 51,500; Referee: José María García-Aranda

26 August 1998 Second Qualifying Round 2nd leg	Dinamo Zagreb (Croatia)	3–0 (3–1 agg.)	(Scotland) Celtic	Zagreb
19:15 GMT	Maric 23'; Prosinečki 44' (pen.), 68'			Stadium: Stadion Maksimir; Attendance: 23,570; Referee: Pierluigi Collina

=== UEFA Cup ===
15 September 1998 First round 1st leg	Vitória (Portugal)	1–2	(Scotland) Celtic	Guimarães
21:00 GMT	Geraldo 86'	Report	Larsson 1'; Donnelly 70'	Stadium: Estádio D. Afonso Henriques; Attendance: 9,000; Referee: Lutz Michael Fröhlich

29 September 1998 First round 2nd leg	Celtic (Scotland)	2–1 (4–2 agg.)	(Portugal) Vitória	Glasgow
19:45 GMT	Stubbs 38'; Larsson 85', 90+3'	Report	Sodestrom 87'	Stadium: Celtic Park; Attendance: 38,076; Referee: Oguz Sarvan

20 October 1998 Second round 1st leg	Celtic (Scotland)	1–1	(Switzerland) FC Zürich	Glasgow
20:00	Brattbakk 23'	Report	Fischer 75'	Stadium: Celtic Park; Attendance: 44,121; Referee: Vasyl Melnychuk

3 November 1998 Second round 2nd leg	FC Zürich (Switzerland)	4–2 (5–3 agg.)	(Scotland) Celtic	Zürich
19:15 GMT	Signore 51'; Chassot 56'; Bartlett 61'; Santanna 75'	Report	O'Donnell 57'; Larsson 72'	Stadium: Letzigrund; Attendance: 14,500; Referee: Leif Sundell

=== League Cup ===
19 August 1998 Third round	Airdrieonians	1–0	Celtic	Airdrie
19:45 BST	Wilson 16'	BBC Report		Stadium: Excelsior Stadium; Attendance: 10,500; Referee: Hugh Dallas

=== Scottish Cup ===
23 January 1999 Third round	Celtic	3–1	Airdrieonians	Glasgow
15:00 GMT	Larsson 3'; Stewart 49' (o.g.); O'Donnell 51'		Cooper 23'	Stadium: Celtic Park; Attendance: 43,642; Referee: Kenny Clark

13 February 1999 Fourth round	Celtic	4–0	Dunfermline Athletic	Glasgow
15:00 GMT	Larsson 26', 31' (pen.), 41'; Brattbakk 41'			Stadium: Celtic Park; Attendance: 47,194; Referee: Eric Martindale

8 March 1999 Quarter-final	Morton	0–3	Celtic	Greenock
20:00 GMT			Viduka 9', 83'; Larsson 58'	Stadium: Cappielow Park; Attendance: 14,000; Referee: Kenny Clark

10 April 1999 Semi-final	Celtic	2–0	Dundee United	Glasgow
15:00 GMT	Blinker 30'; Viduka 39'			Stadium: Ibrox Stadium; Attendance: 43,691; Referee: Willie Young

29 May 1999 Final	Celtic	0–1	Rangers	Glasgow
15:00 BST		BBC Report	Wallace 48'	Stadium: Hampden Park; Attendance: 52,670; Referee: Hugh Dallas

== Squad ==
Note: Flags indicate national team as defined under FIFA eligibility rules; some limited exceptions apply. Players may hold more than one non-FIFA nationality.

No.	Pos.	Nation	Player
1	GK	SCO	Jonathan Gould
2	DF	SCO	Tom Boyd
3	DF	FRA	Stéphane Mahé
4	DF	SCO	Jackie McNamara
5	DF	DEN	Marc Rieper
6	DF	ENG	Alan Stubbs
7	FW	SWE	Henrik Larsson
8	MF	SCO	Craig Burley
9	FW	NOR	Harald Brattbakk
10	MF	SCO	Phil O'Donnell
11	DF	DEN	Morten Wieghorst
12	FW	ENG	Tommy Johnson
13	MF	SCO	Simon Donnelly
14	MF	SCO	Paul Lambert
15	FW	SCO	Darren Jackson
16	DF	SCO	David Hannah

No.	Pos.	Nation	Player
17	DF	ITA	Enrico Annoni
18	DF	SCO	Tosh McKinlay
20	MF	NED	Regi Blinker
21	GK	SCO	Stewart Kerr
22	MF	SCO	Brian McLaughlin
23	GK	SCO	Andy McCondichie
24	MF	IRL	Colin Healy
25	MF	SVK	Ľubomír Moravčík
26	FW	SCO	John Paul McBride
27	FW	SCO	Mark Burchill
28	MF	SCO	Barry Elliot
29	MF	IRL	Gerry Crossley
30	DF	NOR	Vidar Riseth
35	DF	SWE	Johan Mjällby
36	FW	AUS	Mark Viduka

== Statistics ==
=== League table ===
Pos	Team	Pld	W	D	L	GF	GA	GD	Pts	Qualification or relegation
1	Rangers (C)	36	23	8	5	78	31	+47	77	Qualification for the Champions League second qualifying round
2	Celtic	36	21	8	7	84	35	+49	71	Qualification for the UEFA Cup qualifying round (Note: Since Rangers, the winners of the 1998–99 Scottish Cup, already qualified for the UEFA Champions League, Celtic, the losing finalist, earned a spot in the 1999–2000 UEFA Cup. As such, the league's UEFA Cup place moved down to third-placed St Johnstone. Scotland were also awarded an additional UEFA Cup place as the association was top of the UEFA Fair Play ranking. Kilmarnock earned this place as winners of the Scottish Fair Play ranking.)
3	St Johnstone	36	15	12	9	39	38	+1	57	Qualification for the UEFA Cup qualifying round
4	Kilmarnock	36	14	14	8	47	29	+18	56	Qualification for the UEFA Cup qualifying round
5	Dundee	36	13	7	16	36	56	−20	46	

Updated to match(es) played on end of season. Source: Soccerway and SPL official website
Rules for classification: 1) Points; 2) Goal difference; 3) Goals scored
(C) Champions

== See also ==
- List of Celtic F.C. seasons
