= 1997–98 Celtic F.C. season =

Celtic F.C.
1997–98 season
- Manager: Wim Jansen
- Scottish Premier Division: 1st
- Scottish Cup: Semi-finals
- Scottish League Cup: Winners
- UEFA Cup: First round
Home colours	Away colours

== Season summary ==
Celtic won the title to stop Rangers' bid for 10 league championships in a row, and won the Scottish League Cup. Manager Wim Jansen resigned at the end of the season, to be replaced by Jozef Vengloš.

== First-team squad ==
Squad at end of season

Note: Flags indicate national team as defined under FIFA eligibility rules; some limited exceptions apply. Players may hold more than one non-FIFA nationality.

No.	Pos.	Nation	Player
—	GK	SCO	Jonathan Gould
—	GK	SCO	Stewart Kerr
—	GK	SCO	Gordon Marshall
—	GK	SCO	Andy McCondichie
—	DF	SCO	Tom Boyd (captain)
—	DF	SCO	Stuart Gray
—	DF	SCO	Malky Mackay
—	DF	SCO	Tosh McKinlay
—	DF	SCO	Jackie McNamara
—	DF	SCO	Graeme Morrison
—	DF	ENG	Alan Stubbs
—	DF	ITA	Enrico Annoni
—	DF	FRA	Stéphane Mahé
—	DF	DEN	Marc Rieper
—	MF	SCO	Craig Burley
—	MF	SCO	Simon Donnelly

No.	Pos.	Nation	Player
—	MF	SCO	Peter Grant
—	MF	SCO	David Hannah
—	MF	SCO	Paul Lambert
—	MF	SCO	John Paul McBride
—	MF	SCO	Brian McLaughlin
—	MF	SCO	Phil O'Donnell
—	MF	NED	Regi Blinker
—	MF	DEN	Morten Wieghorst
—	FW	SCO	Barry Elliot
—	FW	SCO	Chris Hay
—	FW	SCO	Darren Jackson
—	FW	ENG	Tommy Johnson
—	FW	GER	Andreas Thom
—	FW	SWE	Henrik Larsson
—	FW	NOR	Harald Brattbakk

=== Kit numbers in UEFA Cup ===
- 1: Gordon Marshall, Stewart Kerr
- 2: Tom Boyd
- 3: Tosh McKinlay, Stéphane Mahé
- 4: Jackie McNamara
- 5: Malky Mackay
- 6: Alan Stubbs
- 7: Henrik Larsson
- 8: Darren Jackson, Craig Burley
- 10: Andreas Thom
- 11: Tommy Johnson, Darren Jackson, Regi Blinker
- 12: Enrico Annoni, Simon Donnelly
- 13: Gordon Marshall, Jonathan Gould
- 14: Enrico Annoni, Simon Donnelly
- 15: Phil O'Donnell, Stéphane Mahé
- 16: David Hannah
- 17: Morten Wieghorst, David Hannah
- 18: Chris Hay, Tosh McKinlay, Brian McLaughlin
- 19: Stuart Gray, Enrico Annoni
- 20: Stuart Gray, Phil O'Donnell
- 21: Graeme Morrison, Peter Grant
- 23: Andy McCondichie, Jonathan Gould
- 25: Barry Elliot
- 28: John Paul McBride

== Reserve squad ==
The following players played for Celtic's reserve team during the season, but were not called up for the first team.

Note: Flags indicate national team as defined under FIFA eligibility rules; some limited exceptions apply. Players may hold more than one non-FIFA nationality.

No.	Pos.	Nation	Player
—	GK	SCO	Barry John Corr
—	DF	SCO	Stephen Crainey
—	DF	SCO	Stephen McManus
—	MF	SCO	Liam Keogh

No.	Pos.	Nation	Player
—	MF	SCO	Brian McColligan
—	MF	SCO	Jamie Smith
—	MF	IRL	Jim Goodwin
—	MF	IRL	Liam Miller
—	FW	SCO	Mark Burchill

== Competitions ==
=== Scottish Premier Division ===
==== League table ====
Pos	Team	Pld	W	D	L	GF	GA	GD	Pts	Qualification or relegation
1	Celtic (C)	36	22	8	6	64	24	+40	74	Qualification for the Champions League first qualifying round
2	Rangers	36	21	9	6	76	38	+38	72	Qualification for the UEFA Cup first qualifying round
3	Heart of Midlothian	36	19	10	7	70	46	+24	67	Qualification for the Cup Winners' Cup qualifying round
4	Kilmarnock	36	13	11	12	40	52	−12	50	Qualification for the UEFA Cup first qualifying round
5	St Johnstone	36	13	9	14	38	42	−4	48	

Source: Rec.Sport.Soccer Statistics Foundation
Rules for classification: 1) Points; 2) Goal difference; 3) Goals scored
(C) Champions

==== Matches ====
3 August 1997 Premier League	Hibernian	2–1	Celtic	Edinburgh
15:00 GMT		Report		Stadium: Easter Road Stadium; Attendance: 13,216

16 August 1997 Premier League	Celtic	1–2	Dunfermline Athletic	Glasgow
15:00 GMT		Match Report		Stadium: Celtic Park; Attendance: 45,120

23 August 1997 Premier League	St Johnstone	0–2	Celtic	Perth
15:00 GMT				Stadium: McDiarmid Park; Attendance: 7,488

13 September 1997 Premier League	Motherwell	2–3	Celtic	Motherwell
15:00 GMT				Stadium: Fir Park; Attendance: 11,500

20 September 1997 Premier League	Celtic	2–0	Aberdeen	Glasgow
15:00 GMT				Stadium: Celtic Park; Attendance: 48,483

27 September 1997 Premier League	Dundee United	1–2	Celtic	Dundee
15:00 GMT				Stadium: Tannadice Park; Attendance: 11,668

4 October 1997 Premier League	Celtic	4–0	Kilmarnock	Glasgow
15:00 GMT				Stadium: Celtic Park; Attendance: 47,955

18 October 1997 Premier League	Hearts	1–2	Celtic	Edinburgh
15:00 GMT	Cameron 65'		Reiper 17' Larsson 21'	Stadium: Tynecastle Stadium; Attendance: 16,977; Referee: John Rowbotham

25 October 1997 Premier League	Celtic	2–0	St Johnstone	Glasgow
15:00 GMT				Stadium: Celtic Park; Attendance: 46,687

1 November 1997 Premier League	Dunfermline Athletic	0–2	Celtic	Dunfermline
15:00 GMT				Stadium: East End Park; Attendance: 16,659

8 November 1997 Premier League	Rangers	1–0	Celtic	Glasgow
15:00 GMT	Gough 51'			Stadium: Ibrox Stadium; Attendance: 50,082

15 November 1997 Premier League	Celtic	0–2	Motherwell	Glasgow
15:00 GMT				Stadium: Celtic Park; Attendance: 47,464

19 November 1997 Premier League	Celtic	1–1	Rangers	Glasgow
20:00 GMT				Stadium: Celtic Park; Attendance: 49,427

22 November 1997 Premier League	Celtic	4–0	Dundee United	Glasgow
15:00 GMT				Stadium: Celtic Park; Attendance: 48,200

6 December 1997 Premier League	Kilmarnock	0–0	Celtic	Kilmarnock
15:00 GMT				Stadium: Rugby Park; Attendance: 15,632

9 December 1997 Premier League	Aberdeen	0–2	Celtic	Aberdeen
19:30 GMT				Stadium: Pittodrie Stadium; Attendance: 16,981

13 December 1997 Premier League	Celtic	1–0	Hearts	Glasgow
15:00 GMT	Adam 37' (49)		O'Donnell 74'	Stadium: Celtic Park; Attendance: 49,806; Referee: Mike McCurry

20 December 1997 Premier League	Celtic	5–0	Hibernian	Glasgow
15:00 GMT				Stadium: Celtic Park; Attendance: 48,605

27 December 1997 Premier League	St Johnstone	1–0	Celtic	Perth
15:00 GMT				Stadium: McDiarmid Park; Attendance: 10,485

2 January 1998 Premier League	Celtic	2–0	Rangers	Glasgow
20:00 GMT				Stadium: Celtic Park; Attendance: 49,396

10 January 1998 Premier League	Motherwell	1–1	Celtic	Motherwell
15:00 GMT				Stadium: Fir Park; Attendance: 12,350

27 January 1998 Premier League	Dundee United	1–2	Celtic	Dundee
15:00 GMT				Stadium: Tannadice Park; Attendance: 14,004

2 February 1998 Premier League	Celtic	3–1	Aberdeen	Glasgow
19:45 GMT	Larsson 21' (24), 66' (pen.)			Stadium: Celtic Park; Attendance: 49,844; Referee: Dougal

8 February 1998 Premier League	Hearts	1–1	Celtic	Edinburgh
15:00 GMT				Stadium: Tynecastle Park; Attendance: 17,657

21 February 1998 Premier League	Celtic	4–0	Kilmarnock	Kilmarnock
15:00 GMT				Stadium: Rugby Park; Attendance: 48,477

25 February 1998 Premier League	Celtic	5–1	Dunfermline Athletic	Glasgow
19:45 GMT				Stadium: Celtic Park; Attendance: 48,576

28 February 1998 Premier League	Hibernian	0–1	Celtic	Edinburgh
15:00 GMT				Stadium: Easter Road Stadium; Attendance: 15,137

15 March 1998 Premier League	Celtic	1–1	Dundee United	Glasgow
15:00 GMT				Stadium: Celtic Park; Attendance: 48,564

21 March 1998 Premier League	Aberdeen	0–1	Celtic	Aberdeen
15:00 GMT				Stadium: Pittodrie Stadium; Attendance: 18,009

28 March 1998 Premier League	Celtic	0–0	Hearts	Glasgow
15:00 GMT				Stadium: Celtic Park; Attendance: 50,038; Referee: Bobby Tait

8 April 1998 Premier League	Kilmarnock	1–2	Celtic	Kilmarnock
15:00 GMT				Stadium: Rugby Park; Attendance: 18,076

12 April 1998 Premier League	Rangers	2–0	Celtic	Glasgow
16:00 GMT				Stadium: Ibrox Stadium; Attendance: 50,042

18 April 1998 Premier League	Celtic	4–1	Motherwell	Glasgow
15:00 GMT				Stadium: Celtic Park; Attendance: 49,351

25 April 1998 Premier League	Celtic	0–0	Hibernian	Glasgow
15:00 GMT				Stadium: Celtic Park; Attendance: 49,619

3 May 1998 Premier League	Dunfermline Athletic	1–1	Celtic	Dunfermline
15:00 GMT				Stadium: East End Park; Attendance: 12,719

9 May 1998 Premier League	Celtic	2–0	St Johnstone	Glasgow
15:00 GMT				Stadium: Celtic Park; Attendance: 49,701

=== Scottish Cup ===
24 January 1998 Third round	Celtic	2–0	Morton	Glasgow
15:00 GMT				Stadium: Celtic Park; Attendance: 40,014

16 February 1998 Fourth round	Dunfermline Athletic	1–2	Celtic	Dunfermline
20:00 GMT				Stadium: East End Park; Attendance: 12,322

8 March 1998 Quarter-final	Dundee United	2–3	Celtic	Glasgow
20:00 GMT				Stadium: Celtic Park; Attendance: 12,640

5 April 1998 Semi-final	Celtic	1–2	Rangers	Glasgow
16:00 GMT	Burley 90'		McCoist 75'; Albertz 88'	Stadium: Celtic Park; Attendance: 48,993; Referee: Jim McCluskey

=== Scottish League Cup ===
9 August 1997 Second round	Berwick Rangers	0–7	Celtic	Edinburgh
15:00 GMT				Stadium: Tynecastle Stadium; Attendance: 6,267

19 August 1997 Third round	St Johnstone	0–1 (a.e.t.)	Celtic	Perth
19:45 GMT				Stadium: McDiarmid Park; Attendance: 7,488; Referee: Hugh Dallas (Motherwell)

10 September 1997 Quarter-final	Celtic	1–0	Motherwell	Glasgow
19:45 GMT				Stadium: Celtic Park; Attendance: 37,006

14 October 1997 Semi-final	Celtic	1–0	Dunfermline Athletic	Glasgow
19:45 GMT	Burley 70'			Stadium: Ibrox Stadium; Attendance: 27,796; Referee: Jim McCluskey

30 November 1997 Final	Celtic	3–0	Dundee United	Glasgow
15:00 GMT	Rieper 21'; Larsson 24'; Burley 59'			Stadium: Ibrox Stadium; Attendance: 49,305; Referee: Jim McCluskey

=== UEFA Cup ===
23 July 1997 First Qualifying Round 1st leg	Inter CableTel AFC (Wales)	0–3	(Scotland) Celtic	Cardiff
19:45 GMT		Report	Thom 6' (pen.); Johnson 45'; Wieghorst 81'	Stadium: Ninian Park; Attendance: 6,980; Referee: A Ibanez (Spain)

30 July 1997 First Qualifying Round 2nd leg	Celtic (Scotland)	5–0 (8–0 agg.)	(Wales) Inter CableTel AFC	Glasgow
19:45 GMT	Thom 19' (pen.); Jackson 42'; Johnson 45'; Hannah 63'; Hay 85'	Report		Stadium: Celtic Park; Attendance: 41,537; Referee: A Micallef (Malta)

12 August 1997 Second Qualifying Round 1st leg	Tirol Innsbruck (Austria)	2–1	(Scotland) Celtic	Innsbruck
20:00	Mayrleb 22', 28'	Report	Stubbs 82'	Stadium: Tivoli; Attendance: 6,700; Referee: R Lunge (Netherlands)

26 August 1997 Second Qualifying Round 2nd leg	Celtic (Scotland)	6–3 (7–5 agg.)	(Austria) Tirol Innsbruck	Glasgow
19:45 GMT	Donnelly 30', 63'; Thom 40'; Burley 69', 90'; Wieghorst 85'	Report	Mayrleb 35'; Larsson 42' (o.g.); Krinner 82'	Stadium: Celtic Park; Attendance: 47,017; Referee: K E Fisker (Denmark)

13 September 1997 First round 1st leg	Celtic (Scotland)	2–2	(England) Liverpool	Glasgow
20:00	McNamara 53'; Donnelly 74' (pen.)	Report	Owen 6'; McManaman 89'	Stadium: Celtic Park; Attendance: 48,526; Referee: C Graziano (Italy)

30 September 1997 First round 2nd leg	Liverpool (England)	0–0 (2–2 agg.)	(Scotland) Celtic	Liverpool
19:45 GMT		Report		Stadium: Anfield; Attendance: 38,205; Referee: E Steinborn (Germany)

== Transfers ==
=== In ===
Date	Player	From	Fee
15 July 1997	(Scotland) Darren Jackson	(Scotland) Hibernian	£1,250,000
25 July 1997	(Scotland) Craig Burley	(England) Chelsea	£2,500,000
25 July 1997	(Sweden) Henrik Larsson	(Netherlands) Feyenoord	£650,000
30 July 1997	(France) Stéphane Mahé	(France) Rennes	£500,000
2 August 1997	(Scotland) Jonathan Gould	(England) Bradford City	Free
6 August 1997	(Netherlands) Regi Blinker	(England) Sheffield Wednesday	Exchange
12 September 1997	(Denmark) Marc Rieper	(England) West Ham United	£1,500,000
7 November 1997	(Scotland) Paul Lambert	(Germany) Borussia Dortmund	£2,000,000
10 December 1997	(Norway) Harald Brattbakk	(Norway) Rosenborg BK	£2,000,000
30 March 1998	(England) Kevin Pilkington	(England) Manchester United	Loan

=== Out ===
Date	Player	From	Fee
31 May 1997	(Scotland) Paul McStay		Retired
31 May 1997	(Portugal) Jorge Cadete	(Spain) Celta Vigo	£3,000,000
1 July 1997	(Scotland) Paddy Kelly	(England) Newcastle United	Free
1 July 1997	(Scotland) Brian O'Neil	(Scotland) Aberdeen	£750,000
5 August 1997	(Scotland) Chris Hay	(England) Swindon Town	£330,000
6 August 1997	(Italy) Paolo Di Canio	(England) Sheffield Wednesday	£3,000,000
15 August 1997	(Scotland) Marc Anthony	(England) Tranmere Rovers	Loan
15 August 1997	(Scotland) Stuart Gray	(Scotland) Greenock Morton	Loan
22 August 1997	(Scotland) Peter Grant	(England) Norwich City	£200,000
4 October 1997	(Scotland) Gordon Marshall	(Scotland) St Mirren	Loan
14 January 1998	(Germany) Andreas Thom	(Germany) Hertha Berlin	£275,000
19 January 1998	(Scotland) Gordon Marshall	(Scotland) Kilmarnock	£150,000
28 January 1998	(Scotland) Tosh McKinlay	(England) Stoke City	Loan
5 March 1998	(Scotland) Stuart Gray	(England) Reading	£100,000
15 March 1998	(Scotland) Andy McCondichie	(Scotland) Hamilton Academical	Loan

== See also ==
- List of Celtic F.C. seasons
