= 1998–99 Scottish Premier League =

93rd season of top-tier football league in Scotland

Scottish Premier League
- Season: 1998–99
- Dates: 1 August 1998 – 23 May 1999
- Champions: Rangers; 1st Premier League title 48th Scottish title
- Promoted: Dundee
- Relegated: Dunfermline Athletic
- Champions League: Rangers
- UEFA Cup: Celtic (via Scottish Cup); St Johnstone; Kilmarnock (via Fair Play)
- Matches: 180
- Goals: 471 (2.62 per match)
- Top goalscorer: Henrik Larsson (29)
- Biggest home win: Celtic 6–1 Dundee (7 November); Rangers 6–1 Dundee (20 February)
- Biggest away win: St Johnstone 0–7 Rangers (8 November)
- Highest scoring: Motherwell 1–7 Celtic (21 February)
- Highest attendance: 60,092, Celtic v St Johnstone (31 January)
- Lowest attendance: 3,532, Dunfermline Athletic v Motherwell (23 May)
- Average attendance: 18,577 (541)

The 1998–99 Scottish Premier League season (also known as the 1998–99 Bank of Scotland Scottish Premier League for sponsorship reasons from 11 March) was the inaugural season of Scottish Premier League football, the top division of Scottish football. It began on 1 August 1998 and concluded on 23 May 1999.

The league was made up of the ten clubs that broke away from the Scottish Football League at the end of the 1997–98 season. Celtic went into the season as the defending Scottish champions, having won the 1997–98 Scottish Premier Division.

Rangers won the title with 3 matches still to play on 2 May 1999, after defeating Old Firm rivals Celtic 3–0 in controversial circumstances at Celtic Park. Three players were red-carded during the game and referee Hugh Dallas was struck by a coin thrown by a Celtic supporter and required treatment from paramedics on the field.

== Teams ==
On 8 September 1997, the clubs in the Premier Division decided to split from the Scottish Football League and form a Scottish Premier League (SPL). This followed an earlier example in England, which came into force during the 1992–93 season. This decision was fuelled by a desire by the top clubs in Scotland to retain more of the revenue generated by the game. Originally, league sponsorship money was divided proportionally between clubs in all four divisions. After the SPL was formed, its clubs retained all of its commercial revenues except for an annual payment to the SFL and a parachute payment to relegated clubs.

The new league followed the same format as the previous season's Premier Division, with the ten clubs playing each other four times, twice at home and twice away. Hibernian were relegated to the First Division after finishing bottom of the 1997–98 Scottish Premier Division. They were replaced by Dundee, the champions of the previous season's First Division.

Location of clubs in 1998–99 Scottish Premier League

=== Stadia and locations ===
Aberdeen	Celtic	Dundee
Pittodrie Stadium	Celtic Park	Dens Park
Capacity: 20,866	Capacity: 60,411	Capacity: 11,506
Dundee United	Dunfermline Athletic	Heart of Midlothian
Tannadice Park	East End Park	Tynecastle Park
Capacity: 14,223	Capacity: 11,480	Capacity: 18,008
Kilmarnock	Motherwell	
Rugby Park	Fir Park	
Capacity: 17,889	Capacity: 13,677	
Rangers	St Johnstone	
Ibrox Stadium	McDiarmid Park	
Capacity: 50,817	Capacity: 10,696	

=== Personnel and kits ===
Team	Manager	Kit manufacturer	Shirt sponsor
Aberdeen	(Scotland) Paul Hegarty (caretaker)	Puma	Atlantic Telecom
Celtic	(Slovakia) Jozef Vengloš	Umbro	Umbro
Dundee	(Scotland) Jocky Scott	Avec Sport	Scottish Hydro Electric
Dundee United	(Scotland) Paul Sturrock	Olympic Sports	Telewest
Dunfermline Athletic	(Scotland) Dick Campbell	Avec Sport	Landmark
Heart of Midlothian	(Scotland) Jim Jefferies	Olympic Sports	Strongbow
Kilmarnock	(Scotland) Bobby Williamson	Puma	Sports Division
Motherwell	(Scotland) Billy Davies	Xara	Motorola
Rangers	(Netherlands) Dick Advocaat	Nike	McEwan's
St Johnstone	(Scotland) Sandy Clark	Xara	Scottish Hydro Electric

==== Managerial changes ====
Team	Outgoing manager	Date of vacancy	Manner of departure	Position in table	Incoming manager	Date of appointment
Celtic	(Netherlands) Wim Jansen	11 May 1998	Resigned	Pre-season	(Slovakia) Jozef Vengloš	17 July 1998
Rangers	(Scotland) Walter Smith	31 May 1998	Retired	Pre-season	(Netherlands) Dick Advocaat	1 June 1998
Dundee United	(Scotland) Tommy McLean	5 September 1998	Mutual consent	9th	(Scotland) Paul Sturrock	5 September 1998
St Johnstone	(Scotland) Paul Sturrock	5 September 1998	Signed by Dundee United	8th	(Scotland) Sandy Clark	7 September 1998
Motherwell	(Finland) Harri Kampman	4 October 1998	Resigned	8th	(Scotland) Billy Davies	14 October 1998
Aberdeen	(Scotland) Alex Miller	8 December 1998	Mutual consent	10th	(Scotland) Paul Hegarty (caretaker)	8 December 1998
Dunfermline Athletic	(Scotland) Bert Paton	6 January 1999	Resigned	10th	(Scotland) Dick Campbell	6 January 1999

== Overview ==
The 1998–99 Scottish Premier League season ended in success for Rangers who, managed by Dutchman Dick Advocaat, won the title by six points from nearest rivals Celtic. Dunfermline Athletic were relegated after three seasons in the top division. As champions, Rangers qualified for the Champions League while Celtic were joined by St Johnstone in qualifying for the UEFA Cup. Fourth placed Kilmarnock also gained a UEFA Cup place via the UEFA Fair Play ranking.

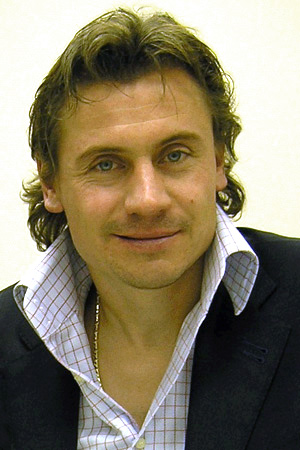
The £5.5m transfer of Andrei Kanchelskis to Rangers set a new Scottish transfer record.

The season began on 1 August 1998 with the first SPL goal scored by Aberdeen's Eoin Jess as they defeated newly promoted Dundee 2–0 at Dens Park. Also on the first day of the season, Craig Burley scored the SPL's first hat-trick as defending champions Celtic defeated Dunfermline Athletic 5–0 at Celtic Park.

1998–99 saw the introduction of a three-week break during January, which was well received by both players and managers. In its inaugural year, the SPL was broadcast to over 120 countries worldwide, while attendances increased and more money was invested in youth development than ever before. A new Scottish transfer record was also set as Rangers paid Fiorentina £5.5m for former Manchester United and Everton winger Andrei Kanchelskis.

Rangers clinched the SPL title on 2 May 1999 by beating Old Firm-rivals Celtic 3–0 at Celtic Park. Three players were red-carded during the game and referee Hugh Dallas was struck by a coin thrown by a Celtic supporter and required treatment from paramedics on the field.

Dunfermline Athletic were relegated to the Scottish First Division on 8 May 1999 after a 2–1 defeat to Celtic at East End Park.

== League table ==
Pos	Team	Pld	W	D	L	GF	GA	GD	Pts	Qualification or relegation
1	Rangers (C)	36	23	8	5	78	31	+47	77	Qualification for the Champions League second qualifying round
2	Celtic	36	21	8	7	84	35	+49	71	Qualification for the UEFA Cup qualifying round (Note: Since Rangers, the winners of the 1998–99 Scottish Cup, already qualified for the UEFA Champions League, Celtic, the losing finalist, earned a spot in the 1999–2000 UEFA Cup. As such, the league's UEFA Cup place moved down to third-placed St Johnstone. Scotland were also awarded an additional UEFA Cup place as the association was top of the UEFA Fair Play ranking. Kilmarnock earned this place as winners of the Scottish Fair Play ranking.)
3	St Johnstone	36	15	12	9	39	38	+1	57	Qualification for the UEFA Cup qualifying round
4	Kilmarnock	36	14	14	8	47	29	+18	56	Qualification for the UEFA Cup qualifying round
5	Dundee	36	13	7	16	36	56	−20	46	
6	Heart of Midlothian	36	11	9	16	44	50	−6	42	
7	Motherwell	36	10	11	15	35	54	−19	41	
8	Aberdeen	36	10	7	19	43	71	−28	37	
9	Dundee United	36	8	10	18	37	48	−11	34	
10	Dunfermline Athletic (R)	36	4	16	16	28	59	−31	28	Relegation to the 1999–2000 Scottish First Division

Updated to match(es) played on end of season. Source: Soccerway and SPL official website
Rules for classification: 1) Points; 2) Goal difference; 3) Goals scored
(C) Champions; (R) Relegated

== Results ==
=== Matches 1–18 ===
During matches 1–18 each team plays every other team twice (home and away).

Home \ Away	ABE	CEL	DND	DUN	DNF	HOM	KIL	MOT	RAN	STJ
Aberdeen		3–2	2–2	0–3	2–1	2–0	0–1	1–1	1–1	0–1
Celtic	2–0		6–1	2–1	5–0	1–1	1–1	2–0	5–1	0–1
Dundee	0–2	1–1		2–2	1–0	1–0	1–1	1–0	0–4	0–1
Dundee United	1–0	1–1	0–1		1–1	0–0	0–2	2–2	0–0	1–1
Dunfermline Athletic	1–1	2–2	2–0	2–1		1–1	0–3	1–1	0–2	1–1
Heart of Midlothian	2–0	2–1	0–2	0–1	2–1		2–1	3–0	2–1	1–1
Kilmarnock	4–0	2–0	2–1	2–0	0–0	3–0		0–0	1–3	2–2
Motherwell	2–2	1–2	2–1	1–0	0–0	3–2	0–0		1–0	1–0
Rangers	2–1	0–0	1–0	2–1	1–1	3–0	1–0	2–1		4–0
St Johnstone	2–0	2–1	1–1	1–3	1–1	1–1	0–0	5–0	0–7	

Source: Soccerbase
Legend: Blue = home team win; Yellow = draw; Red = away team win.

=== Matches 19–36 ===
During matches 19–36 each team plays every other team a further two times (home and away).

Home \ Away	ABE	CEL	DND	DUN	DNF	HOM	KIL	MOT	RAN	STJ
Aberdeen		1–5	1–2	0–4	3–1	2–5	2–1	1–1	2–4	1–0
Celtic	3–2		5–0	2–1	5–0	3–0	1–0	1–0	0–3	5–0
Dundee	1–2	0–3		1–3	3–1	2–0	2–1	1–0	1–1	0–1
Dundee United	3–0	1–2	0–2		1–1	1–3	0–0	0–3	1–2	0–1
Dunfermline Athletic	1–2	1–2	2–0	2–2		0–0	0–6	1–2	0–3	1–0
Heart of Midlothian	0–2	2–4	1–2	4–1	2–0		2–2	0–2	2–3	0–2
Kilmarnock	4–2	0–0	0–0	2–0	0–0	1–0		0–1	0–5	1–1
Motherwell	1–1	1–7	1–2	2–0	1–1	0–4	1–2		1–5	1–2
Rangers	3–1	2–2	6–1	0–1	1–0	0–0	1–1	2–1		1–0
St Johnstone	4–1	1–0	1–0	1–0	1–1	0–0	0–1	0–0	3–1	

Source: Soccerbase
Legend: Blue = home team win; Yellow = draw; Red = away team win.

== Top scorers ==
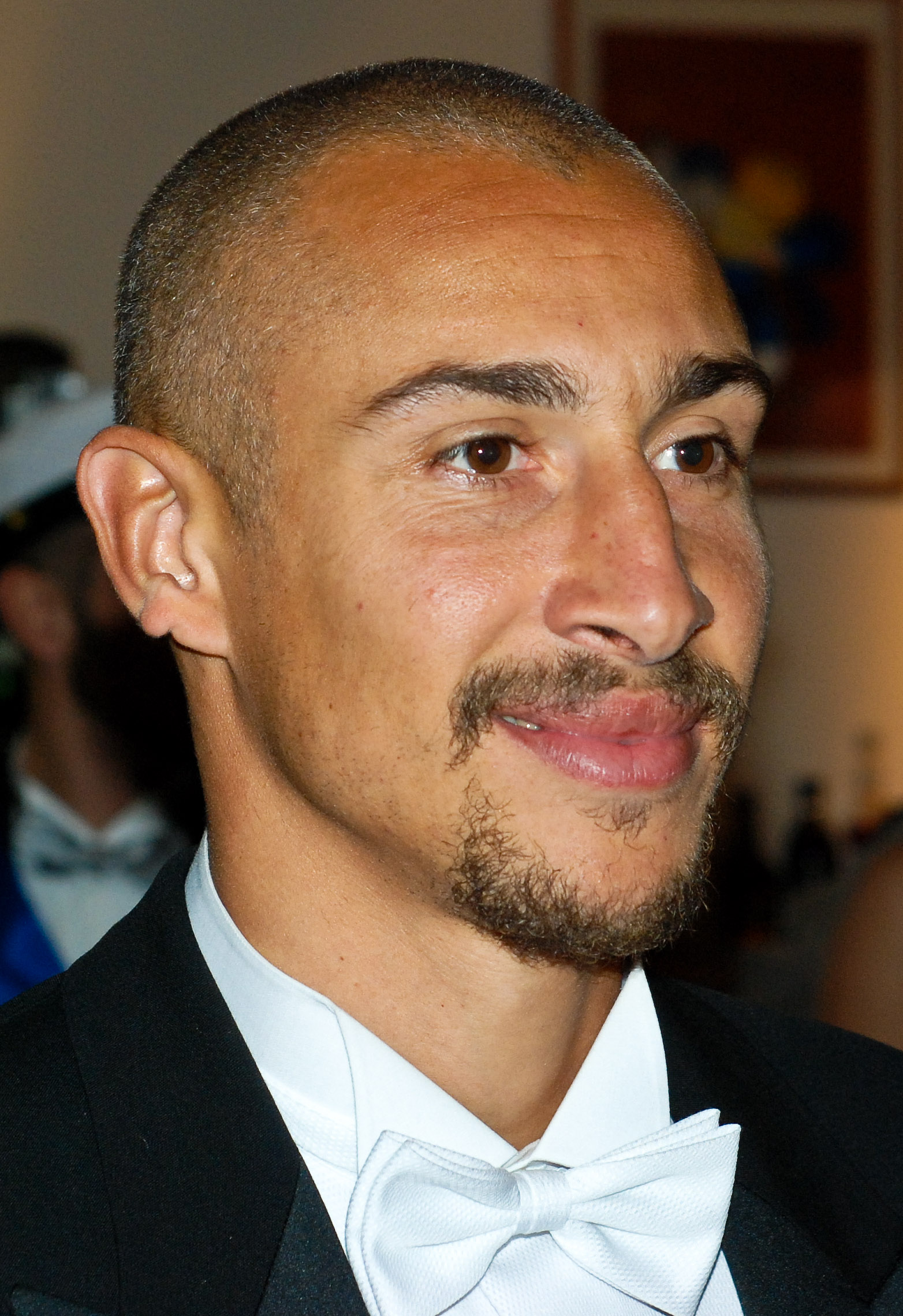
Celtic's Henrik Larsson was the SPL's top scorer in the 1998–99 season.

Player	Goals	Team
(Sweden) Henrik Larsson	29	Celtic
(England) Rod Wallace	19	Rangers
(Scotland) Billy Dodds	16	Dundee United
(Scotland) Eoin Jess	14	Aberdeen
(Scotland) Robbie Winters	13	Aberdeen
(Scotland) Gary McSwegan	11	Hearts
(Germany) Jörg Albertz	11	Rangers
(Scotland) Craig Burley	9	Celtic
(Scotland) Eddie Annand	9	Dundee
(France) Stéphane Adam	9	Hearts
(Scotland) Neil McCann	8	Hearts
(Scotland) Mark Burchill	8	Celtic
(Scotland) Andy Smith	8	Dunfermline Athletic

Source: SPL official website

== Awards ==
- Player awards

Award	Winner	Club
PFA Players' Player of the Year	(Sweden) Henrik Larsson	Celtic
PFA Young Player of the Year	(Scotland) Barry Ferguson	Rangers
SFWA Footballer of the Year	(Sweden) Henrik Larsson	Celtic

- Manager awards

Award	Winner	Club
SFWA Manager of the Year	(Netherlands) Dick Advocaat	Rangers

== Attendances ==
The average attendances for SPL clubs during the 1998–99 season are shown below:

Team	Average
Celtic	59,233
Rangers	49,094
Hearts	14,232
Aberdeen	12,713
Kilmarnock	11,184
Dundee United	9,187
Motherwell	8,533
Dunfermline Athletic	7,375
Dundee	7,178
St Johnstone	7,038

Source: SPL official website
