= Andy McCondichie =

Scottish footballer

Personal information
- Date of birth: 21 August 1977 (age 49)
- Place of birth: Glasgow, Scotland
- Position: Goalkeeper

Youth career
- Celtic Boys Club

Senior career*
Years	Team	Apps	(Gls)
1997–1999	Celtic	1	(0)
1998	→ Hamilton Academical (loan)	5	(0)
1999	Raith Rovers	1	(0)
1999–2000	Albion Rovers	2	(0)
2000	Clydebank	1	(0)
2001–2001	Cumnock Juniors		
2001–2003	Maryhill		
2003–2005	Stranraer	50	(0)
- Glenafton Athletic
Total		60	(0)
- * Club domestic league appearances and goals

Andy McCondichie (born 21 August 1977) is a Scottish former professional footballer who played as a goalkeeper.

== Career ==
Born in Glasgow, McCondichie played for Celtic Boys Club, Celtic, Hamilton Academical, Raith Rovers, Albion Rovers, Clydebank, Cumnock Juniors, Maryhill, Stranraer and Glenafton Athletic

McCondichie appeared once during his spell at Celtic; his sole appearance coming in a league game in November 1998 against Dundee after injuries to Jonathan Gould and Stewart Kerr, and before Celtic were able to sign Tony Warner on loan as cover.
