= Tony Warner =

English footballer & coach (born 1974)

Personal information
- Full name: Anthony Randolph Warner
- Date of birth: 11 May 1974 (age 52)
- Place of birth: Liverpool, England
- Height: 6 ft 4 in (1.93 m)
- Position: Goalkeeper

Team information
- Current team: Wigan Athletic (goalkeeping coach)

Youth career
- Liverpool

Senior career*
Years	Team	Apps	(Gls)
1994–1999	Liverpool	0	(0)
1997	→ Swindon Town (loan)	3	(0)
1998–1999	→ Celtic (loan)	3	(0)
1999	→ Aberdeen (loan)	6	(0)
1999–2004	Millwall	202	(0)
2004–2006	Cardiff City	26	(0)
2005–2006	→ Fulham (loan)	14	(0)
2006–2008	Fulham	7	(0)
2006	→ Leeds United (loan)	13	(0)
2007	→ Norwich City (loan)	13	(0)
2008	→ Barnsley (loan)	3	(0)
2008–2010	Hull City	0	(0)
2009	→ Leicester City (loan)	4	(0)
2010	Charlton Athletic	0	(0)
2010	Leeds United	0	(0)
2010	Scunthorpe United	2	(0)
2011	Tranmere Rovers	25	(0)
2011–2012	Wellington Phoenix	15	(0)
2012–2013	Floriana	24	(0)
2013–2014	Blackpool	0	(0)
2015	Accrington Stanley	0	(0)
2018–2019	Accrington Stanley	0	(0)
Total		360	(0)

International career
2006–2011	Trinidad and Tobago	2	(0)
- * Club domestic league appearances and goals

Anthony Randolph Warner (born 11 May 1974) is a football coach and former professional footballer who is the goalkeeping coach at Wigan Athletic.

Warner notably played in the Premier League for Fulham, having also being contracted to Liverpool and Hull City without playing. He has also played in the Scottish Premier League for Celtic and Aberdeen and in the Football League with Swindon Town, Millwall, Cardiff City, Leeds United, Norwich City, Barnsley, Leicester City, Charlton Athletic, Scunthorpe United and Tranmere Rovers.

At international level, he was capped twice by Trinidad and Tobago.

== Club career ==
=== Liverpool ===
Tony Warner began his career at Liverpool in 1994. He never played a first team game, but made 120 appearances on the bench and earned the nickname Tony Bonus due to receiving many win bonuses. Warner had a spell on loan at Swindon Town in 1997. The following year he had a brief spell on loan at Celtic due to injuries to both of their first-team goalkeepers Jonathan Gould and Stewart Kerr. He made his debut for Celtic on 14 November 1998 in a 2–1 defeat away against St Johnstone. A week later he kept goal in Celtic's 5–1 win over Rangers at Parkhead, and made his final appearance on 28 November in a 2–0 win over Motherwell. Warner returned to Liverpool, but headed back north to Scotland in March 1999 for a two-week trial with Hibernian. After his fortnight at Hibs, he instead joined Aberdeen on loan. He played six games for The Dons in April and May 1999.

His career at Anfield never really took off and he found himself playing as the permanent understudy to David James in his earlier years with the club, but by the time of his departure he was the club's third choice keeper following the signing of Brad Friedel as the new second choice shot stopper.

=== Millwall ===
He moved to Millwall on a free transfer in July 1999. Warner made his competitive debut on 7 August in a 1–1 draw away against Cardiff. Millwall finished fifth in Division Two in 2000, but finished top the following season and won promotion to what is now known as the Championship. Warner earned the nickname "Denzil", because he looked and sounded like the character Denzil from the television sitcom Only Fools and Horses. He became a firm fan favourite which, combined with his prolific penalty saves, earned him his own chant from the Lions fans of, "Denzil, Denzil what's the score? Denzil, what's the score?" Warner was voted Player of the Year 2002–03 by the Millwall fans. Despite being injured and unable to appear for Millwall in the FA Cup final, manager Dennis Wise insisted that he be presented with a medal.

During five seasons at Millwall, Warner made 225 competitive appearances for the club.

=== Cardiff City ===
Warner left Millwall in July 2004 to sign for Cardiff City where he spent two years unable to hold down a first team spot due to some poor performances and eventually lost his place to Neil Alexander.

Due to a goalkeeping crisis at Fulham, they signed Warner on loan in August 2005. Warner's career at Fulham started well, he kept a clean sheet on his debut against Birmingham City and in a match against Arsenal at Highbury he saved a penalty from Lauren with the score at 0–0. However Arsenal went on to win 4–1.

=== Fulham ===
In January 2006 the loan move was made permanent. However, on 4 August 2006, Leeds United signed Warner on a one-month loan, as cover for the injured Neil Sullivan. He made his debut in a 1–0 victory over Norwich City the following day. His initial loan period was due to end on 4 September, but on 31 August the loan deal was extended until 1 January 2007.

Warner started nearly every match for Leeds up to the sacking of manager Kevin Blackwell when new manager Dennis Wise witnessed a poor performance by Warner in the League Cup against Southend United and brought in a new goalkeeper on loan, Graham Stack from Reading who kept Warner out of the side for several matches. An injury to Stack gave Warner his place back in the Leeds side, but his loan spell at Leeds drew to an end on 1 January 2007.

Upon his return to Fulham he played against Leicester City in the FA Cup, but then signed on loan for Norwich City until the end of the 2006–07 season as a replacement for the previous loan goalkeeper; Celtic's David Marshall. On 12 August 2007, after an injury to first choice Fulham goalkeeper Antti Niemi in the warm-up before The Cottagers game at The Emirates against Arsenal, Warner was forced to be a last minute replacement for Niemi, but despite the circumstances Warner impressed and kept countless shots at bay, but two late goals denied Warner a clean sheet and Fulham lost the game 2–1. In the following game against Bolton Wanderers on 15 August 2007, Warner dropped the ball after collecting it from a Nicky Hunt throw-in and gave former teammate Heiðar Helguson a goal for Bolton, but somewhat redeemed himself after pulling off a full-stretch save from Nicolas Anelka and Fulham won 2–1. On 18 August against Middlesbrough, Warner gifted debutant Mido a goal, after Warner mistimed a shot from the Egyptian and the ball bounced off his chest and rolled into the back of the net, as in the Bolton game, he somewhat redeemed himself after pulling off a full-stretch save from central defender David Wheater. Warner's mistake this time affected the score, with Middlesbrough winning 2–1. With Niemi still injured and Warner regularly making mistakes, Fulham manager Lawrie Sanchez, brought in Kasey Keller on 23 August 2007, to provide cover and competition for Warner and Niemi. On 25 August 2007 Warner sat on the bench for the game at Aston Villa. On 28 August 2007, Warner played and kept a clean sheet in a 1–0 victory over Shrewsbury Town at the New Meadow. After the game Niemi returned from injury and Warner was third choice goalkeeper behind Niemi and Keller.

Warner joined Championship side Barnsley on loan for a month on January transfer deadline day, as cover for Heinz Muller's injury. He made his debut in the 4–0 defeat to Coventry City at the Ricoh Arena. He was released by Fulham on 28 May 2008.

=== Hull City ===
On 16 July 2008, Warner signed for Hull City on a two-year deal. Warner made his debut for Hull in the FA Cup match against Millwall on 24 January 2009, where he kept a clean sheet in a 2–0 victory. On 13 March 2009, Warner joined Leicester City on a one-month loan deal after an injury to David Stockdale. Despite conceding five goals in four league games, losing his place to Stockdale, he had his loan extended until the end of the season. He was presented with a medal on 24 April after Leicester won the League One title.

On 25 August 2009, Warner made his season debut and only second competitive start for Hull City in the 3–1 League Cup win over Southend United. He left the club by mutual consent on 1 February 2010.

=== Charlton Athletic ===
On 25 March 2010, Charlton Athletic announced that Warner would join them for the remainder of the season, after their number 1 choice goalkeeper Robert Elliot was ruled out for a month. On 1 June 2010, Charlton Athletic confirmed that his two-month contract would not be renewed Warner was commended by Charlton Athletic manager Phil Parkinson for his experience in helping No. 1 keeper, Darren Randolph.

After leaving Charlton, Warner started training with Roy Hodgson's Liverpool in order to keep himself fit and was training at Liverpool for 3 months before getting the invitation to re-join Leeds.

=== Leeds United ===
Warner returned to one of his former clubs Leeds United on 11 October on a short-term deal to play for Leeds' reserve team after a goalkeeping injury crisis which saw first choice goalkeepers Kasper Schmeichel and Shane Higgs out injured as well as youth goalkeepers ruled out through injury. His deal wasn't extended as Leeds signed Ben Alnwick on loan.

=== Scunthorpe United ===
Warner joined Scunthorpe United on 22 October 2010 on a free transfer, and made his debut the following day in the 2–0 win at Watford. He started his second game in a row which came against former club Leeds United with first choice goalkeeper Joe Murphy still out injured Warner was released on 24 November 2010.

=== Tranmere Rovers ===
Warner signed for Tranmere Rovers on 6 January 2011 until the end of the 2010–11 season. He made his club debut on 8 January against Walsall. After playing all the remaining matches of the season, local media reported that he had been offered a new contract for the 2011–12 season. However, it was confirmed on 21 June by the club that he was set to join another club.

=== Wellington Phoenix ===
It was reported on 5 July that Warner was set to sign for Premier League club Blackburn Rovers. Instead on 17 August 2011, he was announced as signing for the Wellington Phoenix playing in the Australian A-League. Warner made his debut for the Phoenix against Newcastle Jets in place of the injured regular goalkeeper Mark Paston.

=== Floriana ===
On 11 October 2012, Warner signed for 25 time Maltese Premier League Champions Floriana.

=== Blackpool ===
Warner joined the coaching staff at Blackpool in the summer of 2013. He was named as an unused substitute for Blackpool's 0–0 draw with Bolton Wanderers on 1 October 2013. He was released at the end of the season.

== Coaching career ==
On 26 March 2015, Warner joined his 21st club, signing a playing contract with Accrington Stanley whilst also combining coaching with Bolton Wanderers. On 18 May 2015, Warner was released from his short-term contract at Accrington, but stated he intended on continuing his playing career.

On 2 July 2015, Warner is announced as Goalkeeper/Goalkeeping coach for Indian Super League team North East United FC. On 1 August 2015, the club announced that his contract had been terminated for material breach of his Standard Player's Agreement. Warner had allegedly applied for the post of Goalkeeping coach at Bolton Wanderers even after inking a deal with North East United FC.

In October 2017, he was appointed as the goalkeeper coach of Chennaiyin after previously coaching at the Bolton Wanderers Academy.

On 26 July 2018, he returned to England as the goalkeeper coach at one of his former clubs Accrington Stanley. He was also registered as a player, taking the squad number 34 and being named on the substitutes' bench for the first match of the 2018–19 season at home to Gillingham.

In July 2021, Warner joined League Two side Bristol Rovers as goalkeeping-coach.

In July 2022, Warner joined Reading as goalkeeping coach.

On 7 June 2025, it was confirmed that Warner had been appointed as the new goalkeeper coach at Wigan Athletic following a coaching restructure by manager Ryan Lowe.

== International career ==
On 10 January 2006, it was announced that Warner would join the preliminary Trinidad and Tobago squad for their 2006 World Cup campaign but he was not selected in the final 23 man squad. Warner made his first appearance as a second-half substitute for the Soca Warriors on 28 February 2006 against Iceland in a friendly international played at Loftus Road.

== Career statistics ==
Appearances and goals by club, season and competition
Club	Season	League			National Cup		League Cup		Continental		Other		Total	
Club	Season	Division	Apps	Goals	Apps	Goals	Apps	Goals	Apps	Goals	Apps	Goals	Apps	Goals
Liverpool	1994–95	Premier League	0	0	0	0	0	0	―		―		0	0
Liverpool	1995–96	Premier League	0	0	0	0	0	0	0	0	―		0	0
Liverpool	1996–97	Premier League	0	0	0	0	0	0	0	0	―		0	0
Liverpool	1997–98	Premier League	0	0	0	0	0	0	0	0	―		0	0
Liverpool	1998–99	Premier League	0	0	0	0	0	0	0	0	―		0	0
Liverpool	Total		0	0	0	0	0	0	0	0	―		0	0
Swindon Town (loan)	1997–98	First Division	3	0	―		―		―		―		3	0
Celtic (loan)	1998–99	Scottish Premier League	3	0	―		―		―		―		3	0
Aberdeen (loan)	1998–99	Scottish Premier League	6	0	―		―		―		―		6	0
Millwall	1999–2000	Second Division	45	0	1	0	2	0	―		3 (Note: 2 appearances in Second Division play-offs, 1 appearance in Football League Trophy)	0	51	0
Millwall	2000–01	Second Division	35	0	3	0	4	0	―		0	0	42	0
Millwall	2001–02	First Division	46	0	1	0	2	0	―		2 (Note: Appearances in First Division play-offs)	0	51	0
Millwall	2002–03	First Division	46	0	4	0	1	0	―		―		51	0
Millwall	2003–04	First Division	28	0	1	0	1	0	―		―		30	0
Millwall	Total		202	0	10	0	10	0	―		5	0	227	0
Cardiff City	2004–05	Championship	26	0	2	0	2	0	―		―		30	0
Cardiff City	2005–06	Championship	0	0	―		―		―		―		0	0
Cardiff City	Total		26	0	2	0	2	0	―		―		30	0
Fulham	2005–06	Premier League	18	0	1	0	1	0	―		―		20	0
Fulham	2006–07	Premier League	0	0	1	0	―		―		―		1	0
Fulham	2007–08	Premier League	3	0	1	0	1	0	―		―		5	0
Fulham	Total		21	0	3	0	2	0	―		―		26	0
Leeds United (loan)	2006–07	Championship	13	0	―		1	0	―		―		14	0
Norwich City (loan)	2006–07	Championship	13	0	―		―		―		―		13	0
Barnsley (loan)	2007–08	Championship	3	0	―		―		―		―		3	0
Hull City	2008–09	Premier League	0	0	1	0	0	0	―		―		1	0
Hull City	2009–10	Premier League	0	0	0	0	1	0	―		―		1	0
Hull City	Total		0	0	1	0	1	0	―		―		2	0
Leicester City (loan)	2008–09	League One	4	0	―		―		―		―		4	0
Charlton Athletic (loan)	2009–10	League One	0	0	―		―		―		0	0	0	0
Scunthorpe United	2010–11	Championship	2	0	―		―		―		―		2	0
Tranmere Rovers	2010–11	League One	25	0	―		―		―		―		25	0
Wellington Phoenix	2011–12	A-League	15	0	―		―		―		―		15	0
Floriana	2012–13	Maltese Premier League	24	0	1	0	―		―		―		25	0
Blackpool	2013–14	Championship	0	0	0	0	―		―		―		0	0
Accrington Stanley	2014–15	League Two	0	0	―		―		―		―		0	0
Accrington Stanley	2018–19	League One	0	0	0	0	0	0	―		0	0	0	0
Accrington Stanley	Accrington Stanley total		0	0	0	0	0	0	―		0	0	0	0
Career total			360	0	17	0	16	0	0	0	5	0	398	0

== Honours ==
Liverpool

- FA Cup runner-up: 1995–96

Millwall

- Football League Second Division: 2000–01

Leicester City

- Football League One: 2008–09
