= Barry Elliot =

Barry Elliot might refer to:

- Barry Elliott (entertainer), member of the Chuckle Brothers
- Barry Elliot (footballer) (born 1978), English former footballer
