= Gordon Marshall (footballer, born 1964) =

Scottish footballer

Personal information
- Full name: Gordon George Banks Marshall
- Date of birth: 19 April 1964 (age 62)
- Place of birth: Edinburgh, Scotland
- Position: Goalkeeper

Youth career
- 1976–1980: Tynecastle Boys Club
- 1980–1982: Rangers

Senior career*
Years	Team	Apps	(Gls)
1982–1983	Rangers	0	(0)
1982–1983	→ East Stirlingshire (loan)	15	(0)
1983–1987	East Fife	158	(0)
1987–1991	Falkirk	171	(0)
1991–1998	Celtic	101	(0)
1993–1994	→ Stoke City (loan)	10	(0)
1997–1998	→ St Mirren (loan)	1	(0)
1998–2003	Kilmarnock	159	(0)
2003–2005	Motherwell	67	(0)
Total		682	(0)

International career
1992	Scotland	1	(0)
- * Club domestic league appearances and goals

Gordon Marshall (born 19 April 1964) is a Scottish professional football coach and former player. Marshall played as a goalkeeper for several clubs, most notably Falkirk, Celtic, Kilmarnock and Motherwell, and in one international match for Scotland.

== Playing career ==
=== Club ===
Marshall began his career as a youth player with Tynecastle Boys Club before signing for Rangers in January 1980. He then suffered a broken leg playing for the Ibrox club's reserve side aged 15 and after failing to play for the first-team was sent out on loan to East Stirlingshire. Marshall then signed for Scottish Junior club Broxburn Athletic before returning to the senior ranks in December 1982 with East Fife, before signing for Falkirk and then Celtic in 1991 for £270,000, having turned down a chance to rejoin Rangers when it was made clear he would remain behind Andy Goram in the selection order.

Due to the good form of Packie Bonner at Celtic, Marshall was in and out of the first-team and was eventually sent out on loan for first-team experience to St Mirren and English club Stoke City, where he played thirteen times in the 1993–94 season. It was not until Tommy Burns was appointed Celtic's manager at the start of the 1994–95 season that Marshall was the regular first choice goalkeeper. However, that year he was criticised for an error which led to a goal in a shock loss to Raith Rovers in the 1994 Scottish League Cup Final, while Bonner took the jersey for the 1995 Scottish Cup Final victory, Marshall collecting a medal as an unused substitute.

After seven seasons at Celtic Park, Marshall then signed for Kilmarnock in 1998, after Dragoje Lekovic departed the Rugby Park club halfway through the 1997–98 season. He was shortlisted for the SPFA Player of the Year in 1999. He represented the East Ayrshire club in the UEFA Cup and in the 2001 Scottish League Cup Final, lost to Celtic. Marshall played his last match for Killie at home versus his former club Celtic on 25 May 2003 at the age of 39 and then moved to Motherwell, helping the Steelmen reach the 2005 Scottish League Cup Final, a defeat to Rangers. His final senior appearance came at the start of the following season, a 4–4 draw against Celtic (the young opposing goalkeeper had the same surname – David Marshall is no relation to Gordon, however.)

=== International ===
Marshall earned one cap for Scotland versus United States in May 1992.

== Coaching career ==
Marshall left Motherwell in November 2005 to become Hibernian's goalkeeping coach, a position he held until July 2009. He then worked for Alloa Athletic and St Johnstone as a goalkeeping coach before returning to Motherwell in August 2011 as their full-time goalkeeping coach. Marshall left Fir Park in the close season of 2015 to take up the position of goalkeeping coach at Aberdeen, replacing Jim Leighton.

Marshall joined Queen of the South in the 2022 close season as first-team goalkeeping coach. He then joined Hamilton Academical in the summer of 2024, but would leave to take up a coaching role with St Johnstone in September. He joined Hearts as goalkeeping coach in the summer of 2026, linking up for a third time with manager Derek McInnes.

== Personal life ==
Marshall's father was also a goalkeeper named Gordon, who mainly played for Hearts, Newcastle United and Arbroath and was capped at under-23 level by England.

Marshall is married with two daughters named Amy and Fay. His younger brother Scott played as a defender with Arsenal, Southampton and Celtic. His sister played basketball and has 58 caps for Scotland.

He trained as a hairdresser as a young man in Edinburgh and indicated he would like to resume the occupation when interviewed by a newspaper in 2019.

== Career statistics ==
=== Club ===
Appearances and goals by club, season and competition
Club	Season	League			FA Cup		League Cup		Other		Total	
Club	Season	Division	Apps	Goals	Apps	Goals	Apps	Goals	Apps	Goals	Apps	Goals
Rangers	1982–83	Scottish Premier Division	0	0	0	0	0	0	0	0	0	0
East Stirlingshire (loan)	1982–83	Scottish Second Division	15	0	0	0	0	0	0	0	15	0
East Fife	1982–83	Scottish Second Division	10	0	0	0	0	0	0	0	10	0
East Fife	1983–84	Scottish Second Division	34	0	0	0	0	0	0	0	34	0
East Fife	1984–85	Scottish First Division	39	0	0	0	0	0	0	0	39	0
East Fife	1985–86	Scottish First Division	39	0	0	0	0	0	0	0	39	0
East Fife	1986–87	Scottish First Division	36	0	0	0	0	0	0	0	36	0
East Fife	Total		158	0	0	0	0	0	0	0	158	0
Falkirk	1986–87	Scottish Premier Division	10	0	0	0	0	0	0	0	10	0
Falkirk	1987–88	Scottish Premier Division	44	0	0	0	0	0	0	0	44	0
Falkirk	1988–89	Scottish First Division	39	0	0	0	0	0	0	0	39	0
Falkirk	1989–90	Scottish First Division	39	0	0	0	0	0	0	0	39	0
Falkirk	1990–91	Scottish First Division	39	0	0	0	0	0	0	0	39	0
Falkirk	Total		171	0	0	0	0	0	0	0	171	0
Celtic	1991–92	Scottish Premier Division	25	0	4	0	0	0	0	0	29	0
Celtic	1992–93	Scottish Premier Division	11	0	0	0	3	0	2	0	16	0
Celtic	1993–94	Scottish Premier Division	1	0	0	0	0	0	0	0	1	0
Celtic	1994–95	Scottish Premier Division	16	0	1	0	5	0	0	0	22	0
Celtic	1995–96	Scottish Premier Division	36	0	4	0	3	0	4	0	47	0
Celtic	1996–97	Scottish Premier Division	11	0	0	0	3	0	4	0	18	0
Celtic	1997–98	Scottish Premier Division	1	0	0	0	0	0	2	0	3	0
Celtic	Total		101	0	9	0	14	0	12	0	136	0
Stoke City (loan)	1993–94	First Division	10	0	2	0	0	0	1	0	13	0
St Mirren (loan)	1997–98	Scottish First Division	1	0	0	0	0	0	0	0	1	0
Kilmarnock	1997–98	Scottish Premier Division	12	0	2	0	0	0	0	0	14	0
Kilmarnock	1998–99	Scottish Premier League	36	0	1	0	2	0	4	0	43	0
Kilmarnock	1999–2000	Scottish Premier League	14	0	0	0	0	0	0	0	14	0
Kilmarnock	2000–01	Scottish Premier League	31	0	4	0	4	0	0	0	39	0
Kilmarnock	2001–02	Scottish Premier League	36	0	2	0	1	0	4	0	43	0
Kilmarnock	2002–03	Scottish Premier League	30	0	1	0	1	0	0	0	32	0
Kilmarnock	Total		159	0	10	0	8	0	8	0	185	0
Motherwell	2003–04	Scottish Premier League	33	0	3	0	1	0	0	0	37	0
Motherwell	2004–05	Scottish Premier League	33	0	1	0	5	0	0	0	39	0
Motherwell	2005–06	Scottish Premier League	1	0	0	0	0	0	0	0	1	0
Motherwell	Total		67	0	4	0	6	0	8	0	85	0
Career total			682	0	25	0	28	0	21	0	758	0

=== International ===
Appearances and goals by national team and year
National team	Year	Apps	Goals
Scotland	1992	1	0
Total		1	0

== Honours ==
Falkirk

- Scottish First Division: 1991

Celtic

- Scottish Cup: 1995
- Scottish League Cup runner-up: 1994

Kilmarnock

- Scottish League Cup runner-up: 2001

Motherwell

- Scottish League Cup runner-up: 2005

== See also ==
- List of footballers in Scotland by number of league appearances (500+)
- List of Scottish football families
