= Stuart Gray (footballer, born 1973) =

English footballer (1973–2024)

Personal information
- Full name: Stuart Edward Gray
- Date of birth: 18 December 1973
- Place of birth: Harrogate, England
- Date of death: 27 January 2024 (aged 50)
- Position: Full-back

Youth career
- 1991–1992: Giffnock North

Senior career*
Years	Team	Apps	(Gls)
1992–1998	Celtic	28	(1)
1994	→ AFC Bournemouth (loan)	0	(0)
1997–1998	→ Greenock Morton (loan)	14	(1)
1998–2001	Reading	52	(2)
2001–2005	Rushden & Diamonds	127	(12)
2005–2006	Oxford United	10	(0)
2006–?	Guiseley		
- Fleetwood Town

International career
1995–1996	Scotland U21	7	(1)
- * Club domestic league appearances and goals

Stuart Edward Gray (18 December 1973 – 27 January 2024) was an English-born Scottish footballer. He played as a full-back for Celtic and Reading. Born in England, he won seven Scotland under-21 international caps. He hailed from a footballing family; his father Eddie, uncle Frank and cousin Andy all represented Scotland.

== Football career ==
Gray was signed to Celtic as a schoolboy S-former in 1989 and followed the route of many on to the groundstaff at 16 in 1990. He played youth and reserve team football, and was released to play for Giffnock Park North AFC. He ended the 1991–92 season close to a first team call up and won a new two-year contract. The next season marked his debut with one appearance against Aberdeen in 1992–93 but a groin strain in October curtailed his 1992–93 season.

In the 1993–94 season he asked for a loan move south of the border. He spent some time on loan with AFC Bournemouth in February before returning to more reserve team action. At the end of the season he went to Canada on the post-season tournament with the senior team. Out of contract at the start of the 1994–95 season, he was wanted by Sunderland and Blackburn Rovers and signing month-to-month deals. He eventually signed a new deal on 27 January 1995 with the stated intention of leaving if he did not get more first-team football. He had a reasonable run of games and was on the verge of the full-time first-team inclusion.

In the 1995–96 season, he won starting appearances in the latter part of the season but an ankle ligament injury proved troubling and curtailed full involvement. The 1996–97 season was troubled by a knee injury, and he ended playing most of the season with the reserves. Out of contract again, his future looked uncertain. A deal to take him to Lille fell through in the close season and he began the 1997–98 season on month-to-month deals. In October he was loaned to Greenock Morton until January 1998, being recalled from Greenock to play against them in the Scottish Cup tie on 24 January. He played a few more reserve games before being sold to Tommy Burns at Reading on 26 March 1998.

Gray was loaned to Rushden & Diamonds and joined them full-time in January 2001 and released at the end of the 2004–05 season. He joined Oxford United making 10 appearances with them. He was thereafter associated with non-league side Guiseley and he coached the reserve team there, along with Vince Brockie.

== Acting career ==
In the 2009 film The Damned United, Gray portrayed his father Eddie Gray.

== Death ==
Gray died from cholangiocarcinoma, a rare form of cancer affecting the bile ducts, on 27 January 2024, at the age of 50.

== Honours ==
Rushden & Diamonds

- Football League Third Division: 2002–03
- Football Conference: 2000–01
