= Regi Blinker =

Footballer (born 1969)

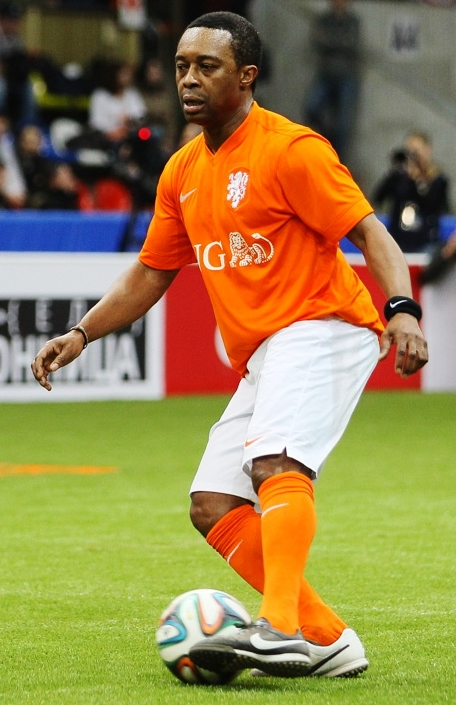

Personal information
- Full name: Reginald Waldie Blinker
- Date of birth: 4 June 1969 (age 57)
- Place of birth: Paramaribo, Suriname
- Height: 1.73 m (5 ft 8 in)
- Position: Winger

Youth career
- Delfia
- DHC Delft
- Feyenoord

Senior career*
Years	Team	Apps	(Gls)
1986–1996	Feyenoord	238	(45)
1988–1989	→ Den Bosch (loan)	25	(6)
1996–1997	Sheffield Wednesday	42	(3)
1997–2000	Celtic	47	(9)
2000–2001	RBC	22	(5)
2001–2003	Sparta Rotterdam	30	(1)
Total		404	(69)

International career
1993–1994	Netherlands	3	(0)
- * Club domestic league appearances and goals

Reginald Waldie Blinker (born 4 June 1969) is a former professional footballer who was most recently the team developer of the Indonesia national team. He mostly played as a left winger. During his 17-year senior career, he amassed Eredivisie totals of 307 games and 57 goals over 12 seasons, mainly with Feyenoord. He also played three years in Scotland with Celtic. Born in Suriname, he played for the Netherlands national team at international level.

== Club career ==
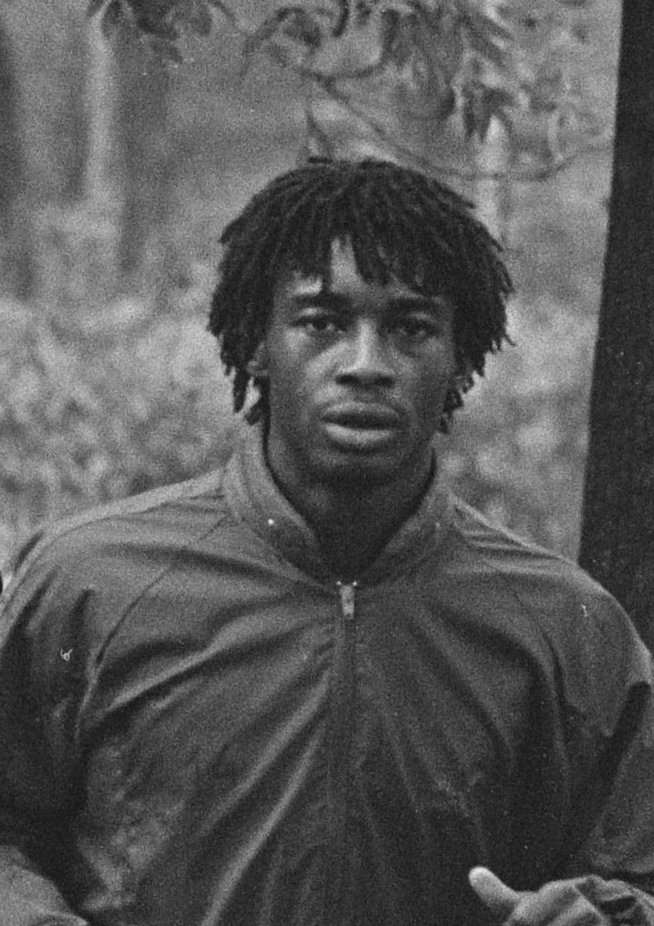
Regi Blinker (1986)

Born in Paramaribo, Suriname, Blinker began his career with Feyenoord in 1986. He stayed at De Kuip for ten seasons, including one on loan at FC Den Bosch, and formed an efficient winger partnership with Gaston Taument (from 1991 to 1995, the pair combined for 61 Eredivisie goals).

On 4 March 1996, Blinker joined Sheffield Wednesday for £275,000, scoring a brace on his debut, a 3–2 away defeat against Aston Villa. He was suspended by FIFA for a time at the end of the year, after it was discovered that he had signed for Udinese Calcio without telling the management at Feyenoord and then subsequently signing for the English club.

In August 1997, Blinker moved to Celtic in part exchange for Paolo di Canio as part of the club general manager Jock Brown's infamous 'trade' deal with Sheffield Wednesday. He re-joined former Feyenoord coach Wim Jansen, who had been appointed the previous month, going on to win the Scottish Premier Division and the Scottish League Cup in his first season and scoring 12 goals in 70 competitive games.

Blinker returned to the Netherlands in the summer of 2000, signing for RBC Roosendaal. After suffering top flight relegation as last, he joined Sparta Rotterdam, meeting the same fate; he played for amateurs Deltasport Vlaardingen for a few more years, before retiring at the age of 37.

== International career ==
Blinker won three caps for the Netherlands national team, while at Feyenoord. He made his debut on 24 March 1993 in a 6–0 home win against San Marino for the 1994 FIFA World Cup qualifiers where he featured 70 minutes, in Utrecht.

Blinker made his last appearance nearly one year later, in a friendly with Tunisia.

== Post-retirement career ==
Upon retiring, Blinker became a publisher of lifestyle magazines for the professional football world in the Netherlands, the company being named Life After Football.

In 2025, Blinker was appointed as a team developer for the Indonesian national football team with Bram Verbuggen.

== Honours ==
Feyenoord

- Eredivisie: 1992–93
- KNVB Cup: 1990–91, 1991–92, 1993–94, 1994–95
- Dutch Supercup: 1991

Celtic

- Scottish Premier Division: 1997–98
- Scottish League Cup: 1997–98
