= Stewart Kerr =

Scottish footballer

Personal information
- Full name: James Stewart Robert Kerr
- Date of birth: 13 November 1974 (age 51)
- Place of birth: Bellshill, Scotland
- Position: Goalkeeper

Senior career*
| Years | Team | Apps | (Gls) |
| 1991–2001 | Celtic | 75 | (0) |
| 1994 | → Swindon Town (loan) | 0 | (0) |
| 1994–1995 | → Brighton (loan) | 5 | (0) |
| 2001–2002 | Wigan Athletic | 8 | (0) |
| Total | | 88 | (0) |

International career
| 1994–1996 | Scotland U21 | 12 | (0) |
- * Club domestic league appearances and goals

James Stewart Robert Kerr (born 13 November 1974) is a Scottish former professional footballer who played as a goalkeeper for Celtic, Swindon Town, Brighton and Wigan Athletic. Kerr was forced into early retirement at the age of 27 due to a back injury.

== Playing career ==
Kerr started his career at Celtic and eventually progressed to the first team when the club's longtime goalkeeper Pat Bonner announced his retirement from playing after the 1995 Scottish Cup final.

Kerr became understudy to new first choice goalkeeper Gordon Marshall but appearances were limited until the 1996–97 season when a series of poor performances resulted in Marshall being dropped in favour of his deputy.

Kerr continued as first choice goalkeeper until the end of the season and performed consistently well, but a blunder in the 1–0 defeat against Falkirk in the Scottish Cup semi-final ended Celtic's trophy ambitions for the season and manager Tommy Burns was sacked in the immediate aftermath.

New Celtic manager Wim Jansen made it clear that Kerr was not part of his plans as he brought Jonathan Gould to the club in order to compete for goalkeeping duties. Kerr was now Celtic's 3rd choice goalkeeper behind Marshall and the new signing.

Despite enjoying something of a cult hero status among the Celtic Faithful, Kerr only made a handful of further appearances before moving to Wigan on a free transfer in 2001.

Kerr's short time at Wigan was plagued by back injuries and he eventually announced his retirement at the end of the season, aged just 27.

== Post-playing career ==
Kerr was appointed as goalkeeper coach at Scottish First Division club Airdrie United in August 2008. During his time there, he was part of the Scottish Challenge Cup winning side and also recruited and mentored goalkeeper Lee Hollis who went on to play for Motherwell and Heart of Midlothian.

Kerr left that position to join Scottish Premier League side Motherwell in September 2009, where he was credited with developing former Norwich City and England goalkeeper John Ruddy, as well as West Ham and Republic of Ireland goalkeeper Darren Randolph.

Kerr left Motherwell in December 2011 to become the goalkeeper coach for Major League Soccer side Toronto FC. During his time at Toronto, Kerr was responsible for recruiting and developing current Philadelphia Union Number 1 Joe Bendik and Canada international goalkeeper Quillan Roberts. Kerr also coached and prepared legendary Brazilian goalkeeper Julio Cesar in Toronto for the 2014 FIFA World Cup in Brazil, which led to Cesar praising Kerr as the best goalkeeper coach he has ever worked with. On 31 August 2014, Kerr left his position as Goalkeeper Coach of Toronto FC after Ryan Nelsen was fired as head coach. On 13 November 2014, Kerr was appointed as a Soccer Consultant to Toronto FC's parent company, Maple Leaf Sports and Entertainment.

On 24 December 2015, Kerr was named first-team goalkeeper coach for MLS side Orlando City. He worked again with Joe Bendik, who had an outstanding season, winning the MLS "Save of the Week" a record 11 times. Kerr received significant credit for restoring Bendik's confidence. On 8 December 2016, Kerr was promoted to Director of Goalkeeping, in addition to his role as first-team goalkeeper coach at Orlando City. One week later, MLS side Vancouver Whitecaps sought permission from Orlando City to speak to Kerr regarding the position of Head of Goalkeeping and First team Goalkeeper Coach. After discussions with Vancouver, Kerr was appointed to the position on 5 January 2017. He enjoyed considerable success, leading the team to the Western Conference semi final and the Concacaf Champions League semi-final in 2017.

Kerr left Vancouver in 2018 following the controversial sacking of Carl Robinson. He was reunited with Adrian Heath in 2019 at MLS Club Minnesota United, where he was appointed Head Of Goalkeeping/ First team Goalkeeping Coach. The club subsequently achieved its first play off appearance.

In 2026, Kerr joined Canadian Premier League side Cavalry FC where he serves as goalkeeper coach for both the senior team and academy team Cavalry FC II.
