= 1998–99 Scottish Cup =

1998–99 Tennent's Scottish Cup
Tournament details
- Country: Scotland

Final positions
- Champions: Rangers
- Runners-up: Celtic

Tournament statistics
- Top goal scorer: Henrik Larsson (5)

The 1998–99 Scottish Cup was the 114th staging of Scotland's most prestigious football knockout competition, also known for sponsorship reasons as the Tennent's Scottish Cup. The Cup was won by Rangers who defeated Celtic in the final.

== First round ==
Home team	Score	Away team
Arbroath (3)	1 – 2	Partick Thistle (3)
Dumbarton (4)	1 – 1	Livingston (3)
Queen's Park (4)	2 – 0	Berwick Rangers (4)
Stenhousemuir (4)	1 – 1	Alloa Athletic (3)

=== Replays ===
Home team	Score	Away team
Alloa Athletic (3)	0 – 2	Stenhousemuir (4)
Livingston (3)	3 – 0	Dumbarton (4)

== Second round ==
Home team	Score	Away team
Queen's Park (4)	1 – 1	Clachnacuddin (HL)
Queen of the South (3)	1 – 3	Ross County (4)
Civil Service Strollers (ESL)	0 – 3	Albion Rovers (4)
Dalbeattie Star (SSL)	1 – 2	East Stirlingshire (4)
Forfar Athletic (3)	2 – 2	East Fife (3)
Huntly (HL)	3 – 0	Peterhead (HL)
Inverness CT (3)	1 – 2	Livingston (3)
Keith (HL)	0 – 0	Brechin City (4)
Montrose (4)	0 – 0	Stirling Albion (3)
Partick Thistle (3)	5 – 2	Cowdenbeath (4)
Spartans (ESL)	1 – 1	Clyde (3)
Whitehill Welfare (ESL)	1 – 1	Stenhousemuir (4)

=== Replays ===
Home team	Score	Away team
Clachnacuddin (HL)	2 – 3	Queen's Park (4)
Stirling Albion (3)	2 – 1	Montrose (4)
Brechin City (4)	3 – 1	Keith (HL)
East Fife (3)	0 – 1	Forfar Athletic (3)
Stenhousemuir (4)	2 – 0	Whitehill Welfare (ESL)
Clyde (3)	5 – 0	Spartans (ESL)

== Third round ==
Home team	Score	Away team
Clydebank	1 – 1	Ross County
Queen's Park	0 – 0	Dundee United
Motherwell	3 – 1	Hearts
Aberdeen	0 – 1	Livingston
Ayr United	3 – 0	Kilmarnock
Brechin City	1 – 1	Albion Rovers
Celtic	3 – 1	Airdrieonians
Falkirk	3 – 0	Huntly
Hibernian	1 – 1	Stirling Albion
Greenock Morton	2 – 1	Dundee
Partick Thistle	1 – 2	Dunfermline Athletic
Raith Rovers	0 – 4	Clyde
Rangers	2 – 0	Stenhousemuir
St Johnstone	1 – 0	Forfar Athletic
St Mirren	1 – 1	Hamilton Academical
Stranraer	1 – 0	East Stirlingshire

=== Replays ===
Home team	Score	Away team
Ross County	2 – 3	Clydebank
Dundee United	1 – 0	Queen's Park
Albion Rovers	3 – 1	Brechin City
Hamilton Academical	1 – 0	St Mirren
Stirling Albion	2 – 1	Hibernian

== Fourth round ==
Home team	Score	Away team
Clydebank	2 – 2	Dundee United
Hamilton Academical	0 – 6	Rangers
Ayr United	1 – 0	Albion Rovers
Celtic	4 – 0	Dunfermline Athletic
Livingston	1 – 3	St Johnstone
Greenock Morton	6 – 1	Clyde
Motherwell	2 – 0	Stirling Albion
Stranraer	1 – 2	Falkirk

=== Replays ===
Home team	Score	Away team
Dundee United	3 – 0	Clydebank

== Quarter-finals ==
Home team	Score	Away team
Ayr United	0 – 0	Dundee United
Greenock Morton	0 – 3	Celtic
Rangers	2 – 1	Falkirk
Motherwell	0 – 2	St Johnstone

=== Replay ===
Home team	Score	Away team
Dundee United	2 – 1	Ayr United

== Semi-finals ==
10 April 1999

Celtic	2–0	Dundee United
Blinker 30'; Viduka 39'

Ibrox Stadium, Glasgow
Attendance: 43,691
Referee: Willie Young

11 April 1999

St Johnstone	0–4	Rangers
		Wallace 15'; Van Bronckhorst 33'; Johansson 62'; McCann 70'

Celtic Park, Glasgow
Attendance: 20,664
Referee: Jim McCluskey

== Final ==
29 May 1999

Rangers	1–0	Celtic
Wallace 48'

Hampden Park, Glasgow
Attendance: 52,670
Referee: Hugh Dallas

== Largest Wins ==
A list of the largest wins from the competition.

Score	Home team	Away team	Stage
0-6	Hamilton Academical	Rangers	Fourth Round
5-0	Clyde	Spartans	Second Round (Replay)
6-1	Greenock Morton	Clyde	Fourth Round
