= John Paul McBride =

Scottish footballer (born 1978)

Personal information
- Date of birth: 28 November 1978 (age 47)
- Place of birth: Hamilton, Scotland
- Position: Midfielder

Youth career
- Mill United Boys Club
- Celtic Boys Club
- 1995–1998: Celtic

Senior career*
Years	Team	Apps	(Gls)
1996–1999	Celtic	4	(0)
1999–2002	St Johnstone	69	(5)
2002–2003	Aarhus Fremad	14	(0)
2003	Derry City	6	(0)
2003–2004	Partick Thistle	21	(1)
2004–2007	Stenhousemuir	89	(18)
2007–2008	Stirling Albion	19	(2)
2009–2010	Low Waters M.W.		
2010–2011	Wishaw		
Total		202	(26)

International career
1998	Scotland U21	2	(0)
- * Club domestic league appearances and goals

John Paul McBride (born 28 November 1978 in Hamilton) is a Scottish former footballer.

== Career ==
A childhood friend of future Rangers captain Barry Ferguson, McBride started his career as a youth player with Celtic after leaving Holy Cross High School. He was with Celtic's reserve team for three years before St Johnstone signed him for £200,000 in 1999. He made his debut on 31 July 1999 against Hearts. McBride scored his first professional goal on 18 December 1999 in St Johnstone's game against Kilmarnock.

After suffering injury problems, he joined Danish club Aarhus Fremad on a non-contract basis before joining up with Derry City in Northern Ireland in 2003. McBride was with Derry City for only three months before returning to Scotland and signing for Partick Thistle in the summer transfer window. McBride made his debut for the Jags against Livingston on 9 August 2003. He scored twice for Partick; once in a 1-0 league win over Motherwell and the other in a Scottish Cup tie against Hamilton Academical. He was released after a single season with Partick after not doing enough to secure a new deal.

McBride signed with Stenhousemuir after being released by Partick Thistle. He made his debut with Stenhousemuir under manager Des McKeown in the Scottish League Challenge Cup against Queen's Park, and remained with the club for three years, scoring 19 goals. McKeown formed the opinion that McBride could have performed at the highest levels of football had he shown the required application and attitude to match his talent, but acknowledged that he had to cope with various issues in his personal life.

McBride left Stenhousemuir in May 2007 to join Stirling Albion. He was released by the Binos at the end of the 2007–08 season.

After a period without a club, McBride joined Junior side Wishaw on a one-year deal in 2010 after playing at Amateur level with Low Waters Miners Welfare.

== Later years ==
In summer 2014, he was appointed as assistant to new manager Alan Frame at Thorniewood United. A few months later he was convicted for possession of cocaine.
