= Harri Kampman =

Finnish footballer and manager

Personal information
- Date of birth: 13 May 1954 (age 72)
- Place of birth: Oulu, Finland

Managerial career
- Years: Team
- 1988–1989: Kuusankosken Kumu
- 1990: Reipas Lahti
- 1991–1996: MYPA
- 1997: Lahti
- 1998: Motherwell
- 1999–2000: Tampere United
- 2001: Finland U21
- 2001: SalPa
- 2002–2005: Lahti
- 2006–2007: AC Oulu
- 2012: Reipas Lahti
- 2013: Haka

Harri Kampman (born 13 May 1954 in Oulu) is a Finnish football manager and former footballer, who has managed among others Motherwell, MyPa, FC Lahti, and AC Oulu.

As a manager, Kampman has led four different teams, Kuusankosken Kumu, MYPA, Tampere United and AC Oulu, to promote to top-tier Veikkausliiga from the second-tier Ykkönen.

== Managerial statistics ==
As of 23 June 2013.

Team	Nat	From	To	Record				
Team	Nat	From	To	G	W	D	L	Win %
Reipas Lahti	(Finland)	1 January 1990	31 December 1990	27	9	9	9	33.33
MYPA	(Finland)	1 January 1991	31 December 1996	155	80	30	45	51.61
Lahti	(Finland)	1 January 1997	31 December 1997	27	14	10	3	51.85
Motherwell	(Scotland)	25 February 1998	15 October 1998	22	6	5	11	27.27
Tampere United	(Finland)	1 January 2000	31 December 2000	33	12	10	11	36.36
Lahti	(Finland)	1 January 2002	31 December 2005	109	41	30	38	37.61
AC Oulu	(Finland)	1 January 2006	31 December 2007	52	20	14	18	38.46
Haka	(Finland)	1 January 2013	23 June 2013	15	8	4	3	53.33
Total				440	190	112	138	43.18
