= Barry Elliot (footballer) =

English-Scottish footballer

Personal information
- Date of birth: 24 October 1978 (age 48)
- Place of birth: Carlisle, England
- Position: Forward

Youth career
- Celtic Boys Club

Senior career*
Years	Team	Apps	(Gls)
1996–2000	Celtic	1	(0)
1998	→ Clydebank (loan)	4	(2)
2000–2001	Dundee	0	(0)
2000	→ Airdrieonians (loan)	3	(1)
2001	→ Berwick Rangers (loan)	5	(2)
2000–2003	Partick Thistle	16	(4)
2003	Stirling Albion	19	(1)
2003–2004	Berwick Rangers	5	(0)
- Linlithgow Rose
Total		53	(10)

International career
1998	Scotland U21	2	(0)
- * Club domestic league appearances and goals

Barry Elliot (born 24 October 1978) is a former professional footballer who played as a forward. Born in England, he represented Scotland at youth international level.

== Career ==
Born in Carlisle, Elliot played in Scotland for Celtic Boys Club, Celtic, Clydebank, Dundee, Airdrieonians, Berwick Rangers, Partick Thistle, Stirling Albion and Linlithgow Rose.
