= Jonathan Gould (footballer) =

Footballer (born 1968)

Personal information
- Full name: Jonathan Alan Gould
- Date of birth: 18 July 1968 (age 58)
- Place of birth: Paddington, England
- Position: Goalkeeper

Team information
- Current team: Forest Green Rovers (caretaker manager)

Senior career*
| Years | Team | Apps | (Gls) |
| 1989 | Napier City Rovers | | |
| 1989–1990 | Clevedon Town | 11 | (0) |
| 1990–1992 | Halifax Town | 44 | (0) |
| 1992 | West Bromwich Albion | 0 | (0) |
| 1992–1996 | Coventry City | 26 | (0) |
| 1996–1997 | Bradford City | 32 | (0) |
| 1996 | → Gillingham (loan) | 3 | (0) |
| 1997–2003 | Celtic | 157 | (0) |
| 2003–2005 | Preston North End | 58 | (0) |
| 2004 | → Hereford United (loan) | 15 | (0) |
| 2005 | Bristol City | 0 | (0) |
| 2005–2007 | Hawke's Bay United | 10 | (0) |
| 2009 | Wellington Phoenix | 0 | (0) |
| Total | | 356 | (0) |

International career
| 1999–2000 | Scotland | 2 | (0) |

Managerial career
- 2006–2009: Hawke's Bay United
- 2026–: Forest Green Rovers (caretaker)
- * Club domestic league appearances and goals

Jonathan Alan Gould (born 18 July 1968) is a football coach and former professional player. He is currently caretaker manager at National League club Forest Green Rovers.

As a player, he was a goalkeeper from 1989 until 2009 playing for numerous clubs, notably in the Premier League for Coventry City and in the Scottish Premier League for Celtic. He also played in the Football League for Halifax Town, West Bromwich Albion, Bradford City, Gillingham, Preston North End, Hereford United and Bristol City. Born in England, he was capped twice by Scotland and was part of their squad for the 1998 FIFA World Cup.

Upon retiring from playing he joined New Zealand side Hawke's Bay United as player/manager in 2006, before moving to Wellington Phoenix as player/assistant coach in 2009. He has also worked on the coaching staff at West Bromwich Albion, Middlesbrough and Preston North End.

== Personal life ==
Gould was born in England and is the elder son of former Wales and Wimbledon manager Bobby Gould. He attended Bristol Grammar School and later worked in banks for a few years, in Bristol and London.

== Club career ==
Gould had a spell in New Zealand in 1989 playing for Napier City Rovers, where he won the New Zealand National Soccer League. Of note, Gould could not get a game in goal for Napier City Rovers and instead played for them as a defender. He returned to Britain and played for Clevedon Town, Halifax Town and West Bromwich Albion before making his name at Coventry City for whom he played 27 games between 1992 and 1996; first under his father Bobby and later under Phil Neal. He was given a free transfer by the Sky Blues in 1996 and joined 2nd Division Bradford City on deadline day. In May 1996 he played in Bradford City's 2-0 play off final victory against Notts County at Wembley, earning the club promotion to Division One (now known as The Championship). The following season, he was replaced at Bradford by Mark Schwarzer.

Celtic plucked Gould from Bradford City's reserves in August 1997 and he made his debut on 9 August 1997 in a 7–0 away win over Berwick Rangers in the Scottish League Cup. He quickly became one of the mainstays of the great championship winning side that prevented Rangers completing 10 in a row. Gould kept 24 clean sheets in 48 appearances that season and his performance in a gruelling 1–0 win over Aberdeen at Pittodrie in March 1998 was particularly outstanding. In addition to his league championship winner's medal, Gould also picked a Scottish League Cup winner's medal that season in Celtic's 3–0 win over Dundee United in November 1997. He also placed third for the SFWA Footballer of the Year award in 1998.

He continued as the No 1 under the stewardship of Josef Venglos and John Barnes. During 1999–2000 Gould generally remained the first-choice goalkeeper at Parkhead despite the arrival of Dmitri Kharine, and picked up another Scottish League Cup winner's medal when Celtic defeated Aberdeen 2–0 in the final on 19 March 2000. Another highlight that season was saving a penalty from Ronen Harazi in a UEFA Cup tie against Hapoel Tel Aviv to help his side progress. However, despite opening the 2000-01 Treble winning season as first choice and playing in the opening 13 league fixtures, Martin O'Neill signed Rab Douglas as a replacement. Douglas soon became first choice at Celtic, although Gould completed his hat-trick of Scottish League Cup winner's medals that season with Celtic's 3–0 win over Kilmarnock in the final on 18 March 2001 (Douglas was cup-tied having played for Dundee in an earlier round of the tournament). He also collected his second league championship winner's medal courtesy of his appearances earlier that season.

Despite his lack of first-team football at Celtic thereafter, Gould remained at the club for a further 3 years having been offered an extended contract by the manager, before eventually joining Preston North End on a free transfer in January 2003.

It was during this time at Preston that Gould enjoyed a renaissance in his form which resulted in a call-up into the Scotland Squad for the European Championship play-off games against Holland.

At the start of the 2004–05 season Gould went on loan to Hereford United where he made 15 appearances. He then signed for Bristol City on a free transfer in 2005 but after three months was released and it was then that he decided to retire from European football.

After becoming a member of staff at Hawke's Bay United, Gould played occasionally for the team in the NZFC.

As recently as 30 August 2009, Gould donned the gloves again, this time for the Wellington Phoenix in their 2–0 loss away to Sydney FC. Gould was on the bench as the reserve keeper due to the club's number one, Mark Paston being unavailable due to the birth of his first child. Had he come on, he would have been the oldest player to make an A-League appearance.

== International career ==
Gould qualified to play for Scotland on the basis that his grandparents came from Blantyre in Lanarkshire. After an outstanding season at Celtic, he was called up to the international side for the 1998 World Cup but was third choice behind Jim Leighton and Neil Sullivan. After the competition he remained in the squad deputising for Sullivan and won his first cap on 9 October 1999 in a 3–0 win over Lithuania at Hampden in a qualifier tie for UEFA Euro 2000. Gould won his second and last cap a year later on 15 November 2000 in a 0–2 defeat in a friendly at Hampden against Australia.

Upon losing his first team place at Celtic to Rab Douglas, Gould drifted out of the international scene. His form at Preston North End a couple of years later won him a recall to the squad in November 2003 for the two-legged Euro 2004 qualifier against the Netherlands, albeit he did not play in either game.

== Coaching and managerial career ==
In 2006, he became manager of New Zealand club Hawke's Bay United, assisted by his father Bobby Gould. In 2009, he left this role to take up an assistant coaching position with Wellington Phoenix FC. After two seasons with the Phoenix both of which resulted in the club reaching the finals series, Gould left to join Perth Glory and work alongside his former Rangers adversary Ian Ferguson. It was announced on 26 April 2012 Gould was returning to New Zealand on a two-year deal to continue his previous role as goalkeeping coach with the Wellington Phoenix.

On 16 February 2015 Jonathan Gould joined West Bromwich Albion as their first-team goalkeeping coach, working for manager Tony Pulis. After Pulis moved to Middlesbrough, Gould was appointed to the goalkeeping coach position there in January 2018. Gould was released from his position at Middlesbrough in May 2019. He was named Preston North End goalkeeping coach as of 12 August 2019, but returned to Napier City Rovers as a Goalkeeping coach for the Rovers Talent Pathway Programme. In March 2022 Gould was appointed the goalkeeping coach for New Zealand.

Gould returned to England in December 2022 joining Stoke City. He left his role with Stoke in December 2023.

In July 2024, Gould was recruited by new A-League club Auckland FC as a goalkeeping coach. In May 2026, Gould departed Auckland FC after two years at the club, having helped the side win the A-League Premiership in 2024–25, and the A-League Men Championship in 2026.

In June 2026, Gould returned to England, joining National League club Forest Green Rovers as set-piece and goalkeeping coach.

In September 2026, Gould became the de-facto caretaker manager, following the departure of Robbie Savage.

== Honours ==
Napier City Rovers

- NZ National Football League: 1989

Bradford City

- Football League Second Division play-offs: 1996

Celtic

- Scottish Premier League: 1997–98, 2000–01
- Scottish Cup: 2000–01
- Scottish League Cup: 1997–98, 1999–2000, 2001

== See also ==
- List of Scotland international footballers born outside Scotland
