= Wim Jansen =

Dutch football player and manager (1946–2022)

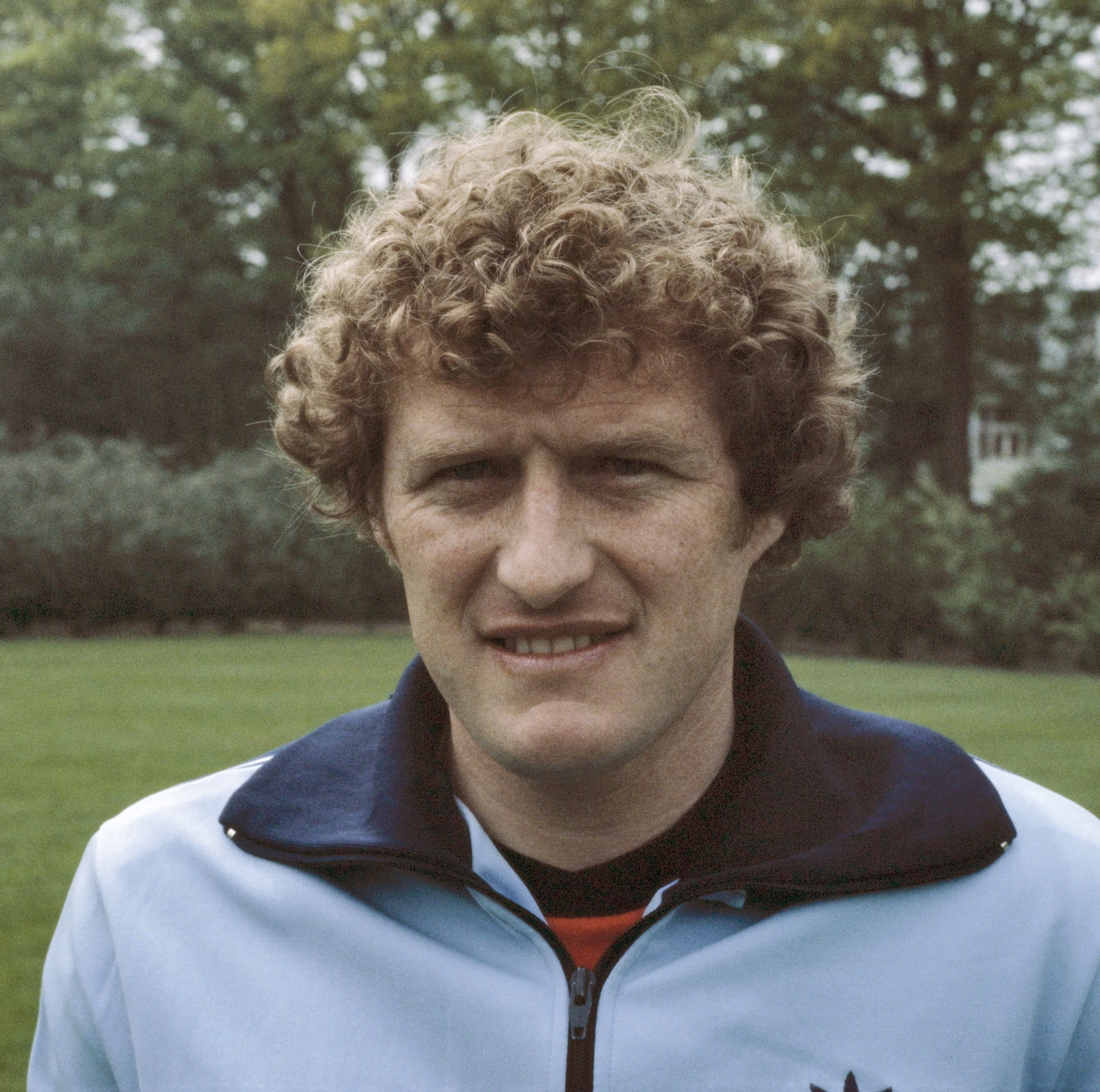
- Jansen in 1978

Personal information
- Full name: Wilhelmus Marinus Antonius Jansen
- Date of birth: 28 October 1946
- Place of birth: Rotterdam, Netherlands
- Date of death: 25 January 2022 (aged 75)
- Place of death: Hendrik-Ido-Ambacht, Netherlands
- Height: 1.65 m (5 ft 5 in)
- Positions: Midfielder; defender

Youth career
- –1965: Feyenoord

Senior career*
Years	Team	Apps	(Gls)
1965–1980	Feyenoord	415	(33)
1980	Washington Diplomats	27	(0)
1980–1982	Ajax	49	(0)
Total		491	(33)

International career
1967–1980	Netherlands	65	(1)

Managerial career
- 1987–1988: Lokeren
- 1990–1993: Feyenoord
- 1995–1996: Sanfrecce Hiroshima
- 1997–1998: Celtic
Medal record
Men's football
Representing Netherlands
FIFA World Cup
Runner-up	1974
Runner-up	1978
UEFA European Championship
Third place	1976
- * Club domestic league appearances and goals

Wilhelmus Marinus Antonius "Wim" Jansen (Dutch pronunciation: [ʋɪm ˈjɑnsə(n)]; 28 October 1946 – 25 January 2022) was a Dutch professional football player and manager.

As a midfielder or defender, he spent most of his career at Feyenoord, winning honours including the European Cup in 1970. He earned 65 international caps with the Dutch national team and played in the teams that reached the 1974 and 1978 FIFA World Cup finals.

Jansen served in several roles at Feyenoord, including winning the KNVB Cup in consecutive seasons as manager in the early 1990s. He also won the Scottish Premier Division at Celtic in 1997–98.

== Club career ==
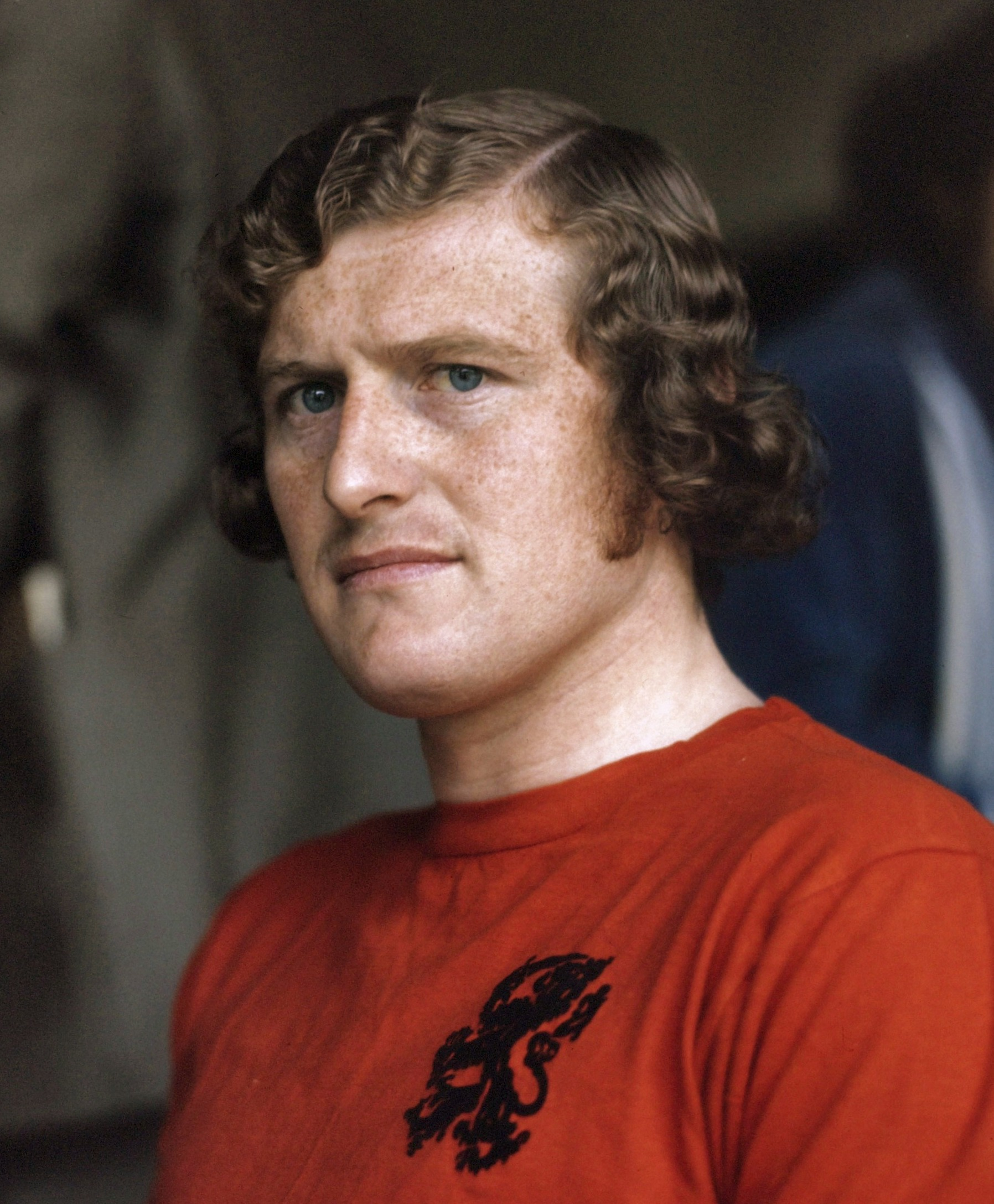
Jansen in 1974

He spent most of his playing career with his hometown team, Feyenoord, between 1965 and 1980. At Feyenoord, Jansen won four League Championships, one Dutch Cup, one UEFA Cup in 1974, and the European Cup in 1970 when Feyenoord defeated Celtic 2–1 in Milan. He scored once in the 1969–70 European Cup campaign, opening a 2–0 home win over A.C. Milan in the second leg of the second round, as Feyenoord overturned a 1–0 loss from the first game. He was the captain of their 1974 team which defeated Tottenham Hotspur 4–2 on aggregate.

After a brief spell in the North American Soccer League with the Washington Diplomats, he moved to Feyenoord's rivals Ajax, where he won a league title in 1981–82. His debut for Ajax was against his former club in De Kuip in December 1980; a fan of Feyenoord threw an icy snowball at Jansen's eye during warming-up which finally resulted in Jansen being substituted within 20 minutes into the game.

== International career ==
Jansen earned his first of 65 caps for the Netherlands on 4 October 1967, in a 2–1 loss away to Denmark in UEFA Euro 1968 qualifying. He scored his only international goal in his eighth game on 4 September 1968, a 2–0 win over Luxembourg in his hometown for 1970 FIFA World Cup qualification.

Jansen played all seven games as the Dutch finished runners-up to hosts West Germany at the 1974 FIFA World Cup, and repeated the feat in 1978 as they lost to hosts Argentina. He committed the foul on Bernd Hölzenbein in 1974 which allowed Paul Breitner to equalise with a penalty as the Germans came from behind to beat the Dutch. He also played both games of their bronze-medal finish at UEFA Euro 1976 in Yugoslavia.

== Style of play ==
Jansen mostly played as a defensive midfielder or central midfielder, although he was also capable of playing anywhere in the defence, as a full-back, a central defender or even as a sweeper. A holding midfielder, Jansen excelled at breaking up attacking plays from adversaries, getting the ball from them, and covering for his teammates. Despite standing at 1.65 meters (5'5), Jansen's defensive skills along with his tenacity, pace, and incredible stamina allowed him to form a formidable midfield trio at Feyenoord with Franz Hasil and Willem van Hanegem, and in the Dutch national team, with Van Hanegem and Ajax player Johan Neeskens. Jansen described his relationship with Van Hanegem as a "blind communication". Van Hanegem remarked that he received all the "smart balls" from Jansen and praised him as a versatile player, noting: "Wim could play anywhere, just not in goal. He was too small for that." Jansen also excelled in offensive duties, such as providing chances for his teammates to score goals. Johan Cruyff considered Jansen to be one of only four men worth paying attention to when they spoke about football. Ajax teammate Wim Kieft described Jansen as the "perfect professional".

== Managerial career ==
Jansen began his managerial career at his old club Feyenoord, where he worked as a coach, and then as assistant manager, between 1983 and 1987. He also spent a season as manager of Belgian club Lokeren. In 1991, he returned to Feyenoord as manager, winning the KNVB Cup in 1991. The result was a surprise, as the club had been near bankruptcy in the preceding years.

The team also won the cup in 1992 and reached the semi-finals of the UEFA Cup Winners' Cup in 1991–92. He became technical director in 1992, and his old teammate, Willem van Hanegem, coached the team to the league championship in 1993 and the Dutch Cup again the following season. Jansen disagreed with Van Hanegem's physical tactics, and argued with chairman Jorien van den Herik when the coach was given a contract extension. He left to work as assistant manager of Saudi Arabia alongside compatriot Leo Beenhakker, and also managed Japanese side Sanfrecce Hiroshima, where he struggled with the language.

On 3 July 1997, Wim Jansen was appointed head coach of Celtic, replacing the sacked Tommy Burns. He was their first manager from outside Great Britain and Ireland, and only the second to have never played for the club. He went on to guide them to their first Scottish league championship in ten years, ending the hopes of rival Rangers to win a tenth consecutive championship. Despite winning the league and the Scottish League Cup during his only season in charge, Jansen left the club less than 48 hours after the title was secured, as he was unable to work with general manager Jock Brown. His most notable transfer was the signing of Henrik Larsson from Feyenoord.

At the beginning of the 2008–09 season, Jansen took up the position of assistant to the head coach of the Feyenoord first team, Gertjan Verbeek. He resigned in solidarity when the coach was fired in 2009.

== Personal life and death ==
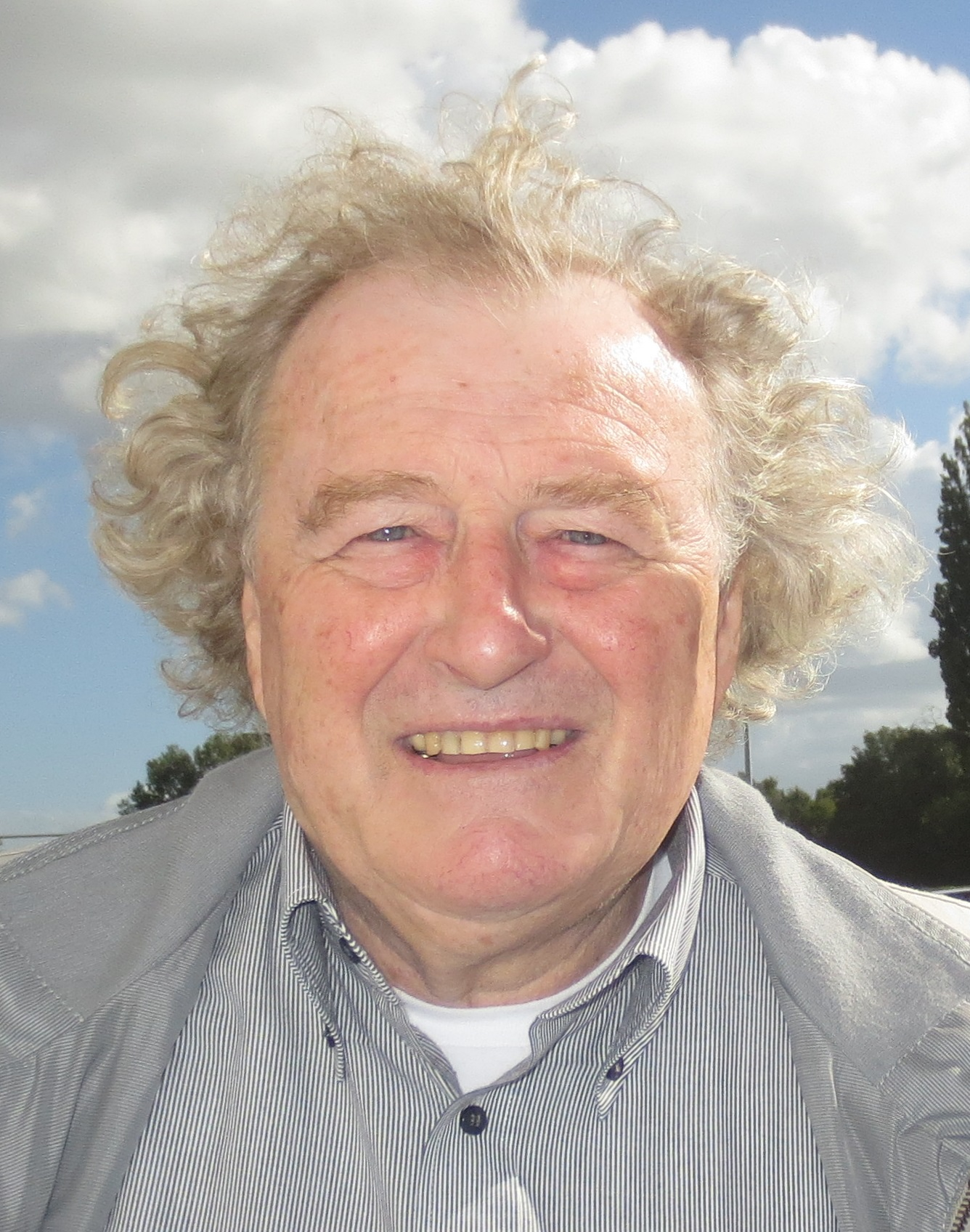
Jansen in 2013

Jansen was given a Latin name, as is the custom for Dutch Catholics, because his family lived with Catholics in the first year of his life. He and his family were not religious, and he would practice kicking a ball at a pole on Sundays while all his neighbours were at church. As a child, he lived on the same street (Bloklandstraat) as Feyenoord teammate Coen Moulijn.

Jansen lived in Hendrik-Ido-Ambacht from the 1970s. In late 2021, he released the biography Meesterbrein ("Mastermind"), written alongside Yoeri van den Busken. At the same time, he announced he had been diagnosed with dementia.

Jansen died on 25 January 2022 at the age of 75. His funeral was held four days later at Feyenoord's De Kuip stadium. In January 2024, his son revealed that Jansen died by euthanasia.

== Career statistics ==
=== Club ===
Appearances and goals by club, season and competition
Club	Season	League			Cup		Continental		Total	
Club	Season	Division	Apps	Goals	Apps	Goals	Apps	Goals	Apps	Goals
Feyenoord (Note: "Feijenoord" until 1974)	1965–66	Eredivisie	2	0			–	–		
Feyenoord	1966–67	Eredivisie	34	2			–	–		
Feyenoord	1967–68	Eredivisie	34	6			–	–		
Feyenoord	1968–69	Eredivisie	33	3			2	0		
Feyenoord	1969–70	Eredivisie	34	8			9	1		
Feyenoord	1970–71	Eredivisie	34	2	1	1	4	1		
Feyenoord	1971–72	Eredivisie	34	2			6	0		
Feyenoord	1972–73	Eredivisie	27	3			4	2		
Feyenoord	1973–74	Eredivisie	30	0			12	0		
Feyenoord	1974–75	Eredivisie	28	3			4	0		
Feyenoord	1975–76	Eredivisie	26	1			2	0		
Feyenoord	1976–77	Eredivisie	21	1			6	1		
Feyenoord	1977–78	Eredivisie	32	0			–	–		
Feyenoord	1978–79	Eredivisie	30	1			–	–		
Feyenoord	1979–80	Eredivisie	16	1			5	0		
Feyenoord	Total		415	33			52	5		
Washington Diplomats	1980	NASL	27	0	–	–	–	–	27	0
Ajax	1980–81	Eredivisie	17	0			–	–		
Ajax	1981–82	Eredivisie	32	0	2	0	2	0	36	0
Ajax	Total		49	0			2	0		
Career total			491	33			54	5		

=== International ===
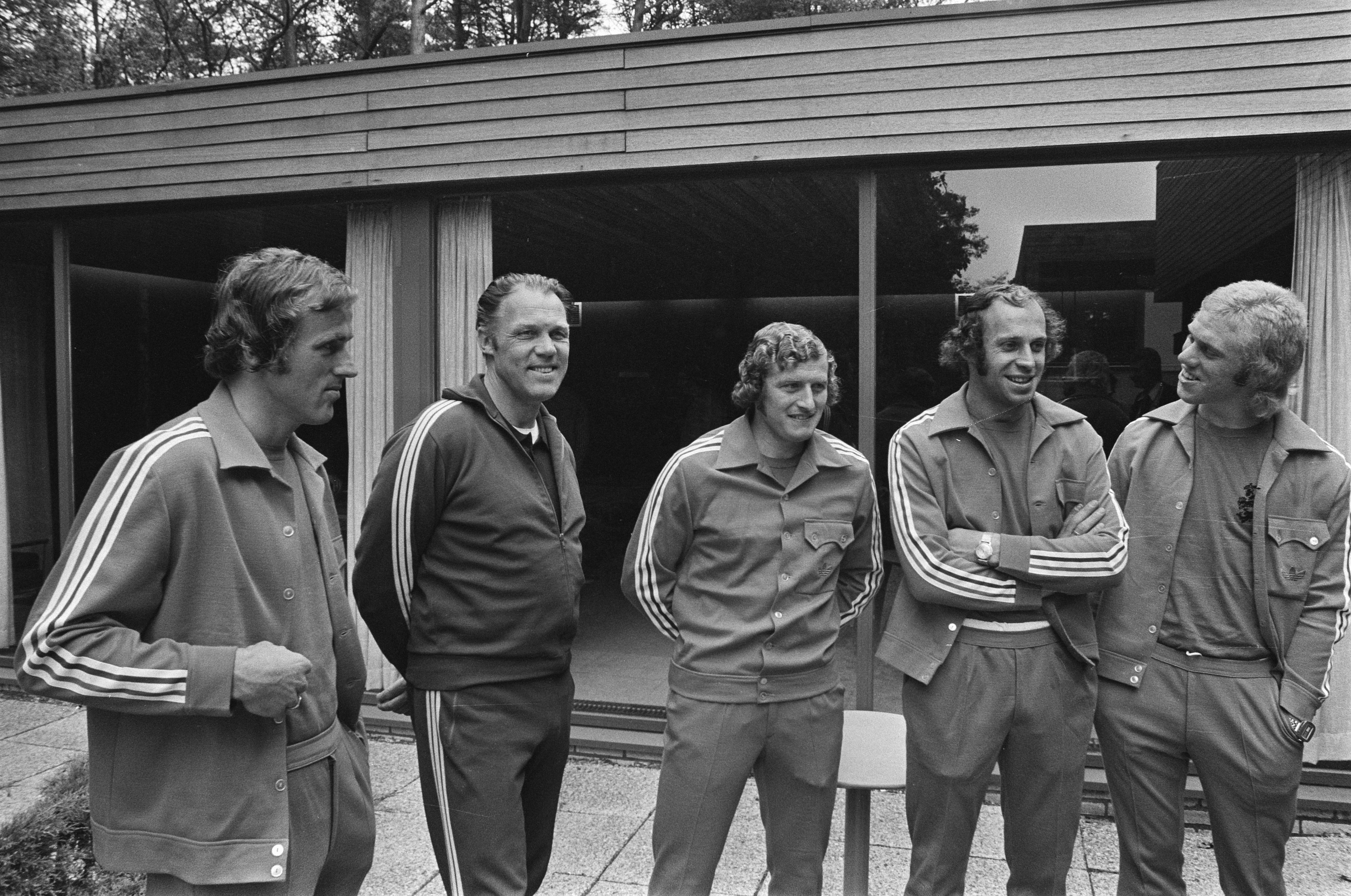
From left to right: Harry Vos, manager Rinus Michels, Wim Jansen, Eddy Treijtel, and Wim Rijsbergen before the 1974 World Cup

Appearances and goals by national team and year
National team	Year	Apps	Goals
Netherlands	1967	3	0
Netherlands	1968	5	1
Netherlands	1969	3	0
Netherlands	1970	5	0
Netherlands	1971	5	0
Netherlands	1972	1	0
Netherlands	1973	1	0
Netherlands	1974	11	0
Netherlands	1975	4	0
Netherlands	1976	5	0
Netherlands	1977	4	0
Netherlands	1978	12	0
Netherlands	1979	5	0
Netherlands	1980	1	0
Total		65	1

Scores and results list the Netherlands' goal tally first, score column indicates score after each Jansen goal.

List of international goals scored by Wim Jansen
No.	Date	Venue	Opponent	Score	Result	Competition
1	4 September 1968	De Kuip, Rotterdam, Netherlands	Luxembourg	1–0	2–0	1970 FIFA World Cup qualification

== Honours ==
=== Player ===
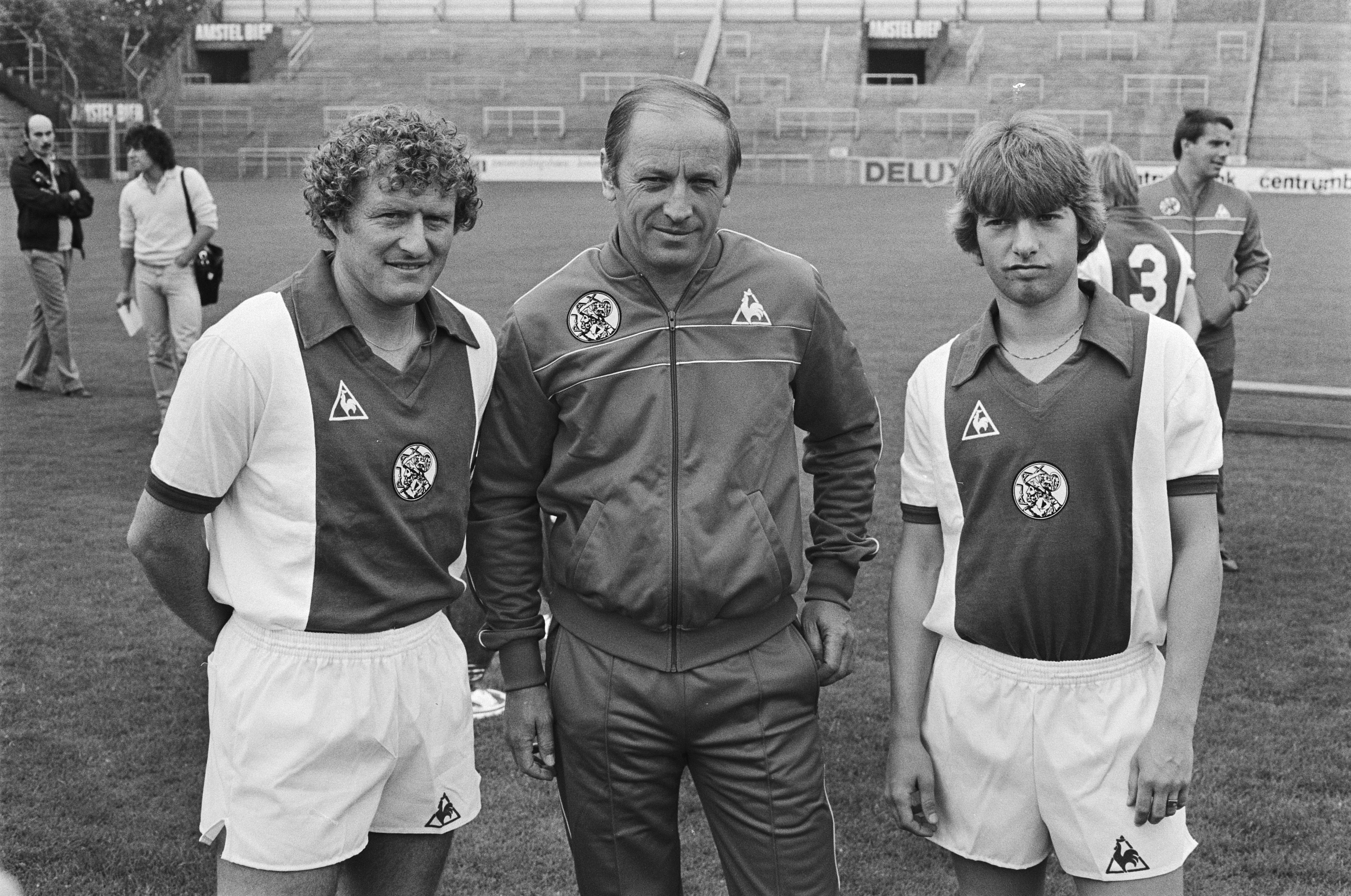
From left to right: Jansen, manager Kurt Linder and Jesper Olsen ahead of Ajax's winning 1981–82 season

Feyenoord

- Eredivisie: 1964–65, 1968–69, 1970–71, 1973–74
- KNVB Cup: 1968–69
- European Cup: 1969–70
- Intercontinental Cup: 1970
- UEFA Cup: 1973–74

Ajax

- Eredivisie: 1981–82

Netherlands

- FIFA World Cup runner-up: 1974, 1978
- UEFA European Championship third place: 1976
- Tournoi de Paris: 1978

=== Manager ===
Feyenoord

- KNVB Cup: 1990–91, 1991–92

Celtic

- Scottish Premier Division: 1997–98
- Scottish League Cup: 1997–98
