= 1997–98 Scottish Premier Division =

92nd season of top-tier football league in Scotland

Scottish Premier Division
- Season: 1997–98
- Dates: 1 August 1997 – 9 May 1998
- Champions: Celtic; 7th Premier Division title 36th Scottish title
- Promoted: St Johnstone
- Relegated: Hibernian
- Champions League: Celtic
- Cup Winners' Cup: Heart of Midlothian
- UEFA Cup: Rangers; Kilmarnock
- Goals: 497 (7)
- Average goals/game: 2.8
- Top goalscorer: Marco Negri (32)
- Biggest home win: Rangers 7–0 Dunfermline (18 Oct)
- Biggest away win: Kilmarnock 0–3 Rangers (24 Sep); Kilmarnock 0–3 Heart of Midlothian (27 Sep); Motherwell 1–4 Heart of Midlothian (4 Oct); Aberdeen 1–4 Heart of Midlothian (1 Nov); Heart of Midlothian 2–5 Rangers (20 Dec); Heart of Midlothian 0–3 Rangers (25 Apr)
- Highest attendance: 50,500, Celtic v St Johnstone (9 May)
- Lowest attendance: 4,385, St Johnstone v Kilmarnock (13 Dec)
- Average attendance: 18,036 (842)

The 1997–98 Scottish Premier Division season was the last season of Scottish Football League Premier Division football before the change to the Scottish Premier League. It began on 1 August 1997.

== Overview ==
The 1997–98 Scottish Premier Division season ended in success for Celtic who won by two points from nearest rivals Rangers, beating St Johnstone on the last day to clinch the title. Claiming the trophy would have given Rangers a record-breaking 10 Scottish League Championships in a row (having matched Celtic's record the previous season). Heart of Midlothian ran Celtic and Rangers very close to winning the title, and led for large spells of the season before falling away towards the end of the season. Hibernian were relegated to the First Division after finishing bottom. As champions, Celtic qualified for the Champions League while Rangers were joined by Kilmarnock in qualifying for the UEFA Cup. Third-placed Heart of Midlothian qualified for the last Cup Winners' Cup as Scottish Cup winners.

Rangers were involved in some of the season's big transfers with Lorenzo Amoruso and Marco Negri arriving in multimillion-pound deals. Paul Gascoigne also left the club, heading for Middlesbrough in a £3.5m deal. Negri went on to become only the second player to score five goals in a Scottish Premier Division match, equalling Paul Sturrock's record by netting all five goals in a 5–1 win over Dundee United.

The season began on 2 August with the first goal of the season scored by Dundee United's Kjell Olofsson as they drew 1–1 at newly promoted St Johnstone. The season ended on 9 May with Hibernian's Stevie Crawford netting a last-minute equaliser away to Kilmarnock to score the final goal of the season.

== Clubs ==
=== Promotion and relegation from 1996–97 ===
Promoted from First Division to Premier League

- St Johnstone

Relegated from Premier Division to First Division

- Raith Rovers

=== Stadia and locations ===
Location of clubs in the 1997–98 Scottish Premier Division

Team	Location	Stadium
Aberdeen	Aberdeen	Pittodrie Stadium
Celtic	Parkhead, Glasgow	Celtic Park
Dundee United	Dundee	Tannadice Park
Dunfermline Athletic	Dunfermline	East End Park
Heart of Midlothian	Gorgie, Edinburgh	Tynecastle Park
Hibernian	Leith, Edinburgh	Easter Road
Kilmarnock	Kilmarnock	Rugby Park
Motherwell	Motherwell	Fir Park
Rangers	Ibrox, Glasgow	Ibrox Park
St Johnstone	Perth	McDiarmid Park

=== Managers ===
Team	Manager
Aberdeen	(Scotland) Alex Miller
Celtic	(Netherlands) Wim Jansen
Dundee United	(Scotland) Tommy McLean
Dunfermline Athletic	(Scotland) Bert Paton
Heart of Midlothian	(Scotland) Jim Jefferies
Hibernian	(Scotland) Alex McLeish
Kilmarnock	(Scotland) Bobby Williamson
Motherwell	(Finland) Harri Kampman
Rangers	(Scotland) Walter Smith
St Johnstone	(Scotland) Paul Sturrock

==== Managerial changes ====
Team	Outgoing manager	Date of vacancy	Manner of departure	Incoming manager	Date of appointment
Celtic	(Scotland) Billy Stark	11 May 1997	Caretaker spell ended	(Netherlands) Wim Jansen	4 July 1997
Aberdeen	(Scotland) Roy Aitken	10 November 1997	Sacked	(Scotland) Alex Miller	21 November 1997
Hibernian	(Scotland) Jim Duffy	2 February 1998	Sacked	(Scotland) Alex McLeish	11 February 1998
Motherwell	(Scotland) Alex McLeish	11 February 1998	Signed by Hibernian	(Finland) Harri Kampman	25 February 1998

== Events ==
- 23 August: Marco Negri equals Paul Sturrock's record with five goals in one match in the 5–1 win over Dundee United
- September: Darren Jackson undergoes surgery for hydrocephalus, returning to action within three months
- 9 May: Celtic win the title after a 2–0 home win over St Johnstone F.C

== League table ==
Pos	Team	Pld	W	D	L	GF	GA	GD	Pts	Qualification or relegation
1	Celtic (C)	36	22	8	6	64	24	+40	74	Qualification for the Champions League first qualifying round
2	Rangers	36	21	9	6	76	38	+38	72	Qualification for the UEFA Cup first qualifying round
3	Heart of Midlothian	36	19	10	7	70	46	+24	67	Qualification for the Cup Winners' Cup qualifying round
4	Kilmarnock	36	13	11	12	40	52	−12	50	Qualification for the UEFA Cup first qualifying round
5	St Johnstone	36	13	9	14	38	42	−4	48	
6	Aberdeen	36	9	12	15	39	53	−14	39	
7	Dundee United	36	8	13	15	43	51	−8	37	
8	Dunfermline Athletic	36	8	13	15	43	68	−25	37	
9	Motherwell	36	9	7	20	46	64	−18	34	
10	Hibernian (R)	36	6	12	18	38	59	−21	30	Relegation to the First Division

Source: Rec.Sport.Soccer Statistics Foundation
Rules for classification: 1) Points; 2) Goal difference; 3) Goals scored
(C) Champions; (R) Relegated

== Results ==
=== Matches 1–18 ===
During matches 1–18 each team plays every other team twice (home and away).

Home \ Away	ABE	CEL	DUN	DNF	HOM	HIB	KIL	MOT	RAN	STJ
Aberdeen		0–2	1–1	1–2	1–4	2–0	0–0	1–3	1–1	1–1
Celtic	2–0		4–0	1–2	1–0	5–0	4–0	0–2	1–1	2–0
Dundee United	5–0	1–2		0–0	0–0	1–1	1–2	4–0	2–1	2–1
Dunfermline Athletic	1–1	0–2	3–3		2–1	2–1	1–1	0–2	0–0	2–2
Heart of Midlothian	4–1	1–2	2–1	3–1		2–0	5–3	2–0	2–5	2–1
Hibernian	2–2	2–1	1–3	5–2	0–1		4–0	1–1	3–4	1–1
Kilmarnock	1–0	0–0	1–3	2–1	0–3	2–1		2–1	0–3	0–1
Motherwell	1–2	2–3	1–0	2–0	1–4	1–1	0–1		1–1	0–1
Rangers	3–3	1–0	5–1	7–0	3–1	1–0	4–1	2–2		3–2
St Johnstone	1–0	0–2	1–1	0–2	1–2	1–0	1–1	4–3	0–2	

Source: Soccerbot
Legend: Blue = home team win; Yellow = draw; Red = away team win.

=== Matches 19–36 ===
During matches 19–36 each team plays every other team a further two times (home and away).

Home \ Away	ABE	CEL	DUN	DNF	HOM	HIB	KIL	MOT	RAN	STJ
Aberdeen		0–1	1–0	2–0	2–2	3–0	0–0	3–0	1–0	0–1
Celtic	3–1		1–1	5–1	0–0	0–0	4–0	4–1	2–0	2–0
Dundee United	0–0	0–1		2–2	0–1	1–1	1–1	1–0	1–2	0–2
Dunfermline Athletic	3–3	1–1	2–2		1–3	1–1	3–2	2–1	2–3	0–1
Heart of Midlothian	3–1	1–1	2–0	2–0		2–2	1–1	1–1	0–3	1–1
Hibernian	1–1	0–1	1–2	1–0	2–1		0–1	1–0	1–2	0–1
Kilmarnock	2–1	1–2	1–0	3–0	2–2	1–1		4–1	1–1	1–0
Motherwell	1–2	1–1	1–0	1–3	2–4	6–2	1–1		2–1	2–1
Rangers	2–0	2–0	4–1	1–1	2–2	1–0	0–1	1–0		2–1
St Johnstone	0–1	1–0	1–1	0–0	2–3	1–1	1–0	3–2	2–0	

Source: Soccerbot
Legend: Blue = home team win; Yellow = draw; Red = away team win.

== Top scorers ==
Player	Goals	Team
(Italy) Marco Negri	32	Rangers
(Sweden) Kjell Olofsson	18	Dundee United
(Sweden) Henrik Larsson	16	Celtic
(Scotland) Andy Smith	16	Dunfermline Athletic
(Republic of Ireland) Tommy Coyne	14	Motherwell
(Scotland) Jim Hamilton	14	Heart of Midlothian
(Republic of Ireland) Owen Coyle	11	Motherwell
(Germany) Jörg Albertz	10	Rangers
(Scotland) Craig Burley	10	Celtic
(Scotland) Billy Dodds	10	Aberdeen
(Scotland) Simon Donnelly	10	Celtic
(Scotland) Neil McCann	10	Heart of Midlothian
(Northern Ireland) George O'Boyle	10	St Johnstone
(Scotland) Paul Wright	10	Kilmarnock

Source: Soccerbot

== Awards ==
- Player awards

Award	Winner	Club
PFA Players' Player of the Year	(Scotland) Jackie McNamara	Celtic
PFA Young Player of the Year	(Scotland) Gary Naysmith	Heart of Midlothian
SFWA Footballer of the Year	(Scotland) Craig Burley	Celtic

- Manager awards

Award	Winner	Club
SFWA Manager of the Year	(Netherlands) Wim Jansen	Celtic
