= 2000–01 Hibernian F.C. season =

Hibernian
2000–01 season
- Manager: Alex McLeish
- SPL: 3rd
- Scottish Cup: Final
- League Cup: Quarter
- Top goalscorer: League: Paatelainen, 11; All: Paatelainen, 12
- Highest home attendance: 14939
- Lowest home attendance: 8224
- Average home league attendance: 10793 (down 1277)
Home colours

Season 2000–01 was Hibs' second season in the Scottish Premier League, after gaining promotion from the First Division in 1999. 2000–01 proved to be a successful season for Hibs, as they started the season extremely well and eventually finished third, qualifying for the 2001–02 UEFA Cup. The club also had a good Scottish Cup run, reaching the 2001 Scottish Cup Final, but were beaten 3–0 by treble winners Celtic at Hampden Park. The season was also memorable for Hibs fans due to a 6–2 win in an Edinburgh derby against Hearts.

== League season ==
Hibs got off to an excellent start to the league season, winning 11 of their first 14 games. This led to Celtic manager Martin O'Neill describing Hibs as "worthy challengers" for the league in October, after they had beaten defending champions Rangers 1–0 at Easter Road. Rangers manager Dick Advocaat dismissed Hibs' chances, but Hibs responded with a "scintillating display" as they won 6–2 in an Edinburgh derby days later, with Mixu Paatelainen scoring a hat-trick. Celtic eventually ran away with the league championship, but Hibs continued to challenge for second place until a losing run in March effectively ended their chances of finishing above Rangers. Their early season form, however, meant that Hibs finished well clear of the other SPL clubs in third place, qualifying for the following season's UEFA Cup competition.

=== Results ===
30 July 2000 SPL	Heart of Midlothian	0–0	Hibernian	Tynecastle, Edinburgh
				Attendance: 17,132; Referee: Clark

5 August 2000 SPL	Hibernian	3–0	Dundee United	Easter Road, Edinburgh
	Agathe 2'; Agathe 19'; McManus 90'			Attendance: 9,541; Referee: Dougal

12 August 2000 SPL	Hibernian	5–1	Dundee	Easter Road, Edinburgh
	Agathe 16'; Agathe 41'; Lehmann 81'; Lehmann 82'; Lovell 85'		Caballero 9'	Attendance: 12,075; Referee: Clyde

16 August 2000 SPL	Kilmarnock	0–1	Hibernian	Rugby Park, Kilmarnock
			Paatelainen 37'	Attendance: 8,672; Referee: Freeland

19 August 2000 SPL	Aberdeen	0–2	Hibernian	Pittodrie Stadium, Aberdeen
			Latapy 5' (pen); Paatelainen 78'	Attendance: 13,157; Referee: McCurry

26 August 2000 SPL	Hibernian	2–0	St Mirren	Easter Road, Edinburgh
	Lovell 43'; Lovell 90'			Attendance: 11,806; Referee: Somers

9 September 2000 SPL	Celtic	3–0	Hibernian	Celtic Park, Glasgow
	Larsson 16' (pen); Larsson 45'; Burchill 90'			Attendance: 60,091; Referee: Rowbotham

16 September 2000 SPL	Hibernian	2–0	Motherwell	Easter Road, Edinburgh
	Paatelainen 49'; Paatelainen 80'			Attendance: 9,852; Referee: McCurry

23 September 2000 SPL	Dunfermline Athletic	1–1	Hibernian	East End Park, Dunfermline
	Moss 48'		Latapy 22' (pen)	Attendance: 8,275; Referee: Clyde

30 September 2000 SPL	St Johnstone	0–3	Hibernian	McDiarmid Park, Perth
			Sauzee 16'; Zitelli 23'; Latapy 74'	Attendance: 5,464; Referee: Dallas

14 October 2000 SPL	Hibernian	1–0	Rangers	Easter Road, Edinburgh
	Zitelli 23'			Attendance: 14,523; Referee: Clark

22 October 2000 SPL	Hibernian	6–2	Heart of Midlothian	Easter Road, Edinburgh
	Paatelainen 43'; Paatelainen 45'; Zitelli 51'; Paatelainen 74'; O'Neil 81'; Latapy 84'		Kirk 5'; Cameron 89'	Attendance: 12,926; Referee: Dallas

28 October 2000 SPL	Dundee United	0–1	Hibernian	Tannadice Park, Dundee
			McManus 81'	Attendance: 8,042; Referee: Rowbotham

5 November 2000 SPL	Dundee	1–2	Hibernian	Dens Park, Dundee
	Tweed 33'		O'Neil 17'; Zitelli 62'	Attendance: 6,604; Referee: McDonald

11 November 2000 SPL	Hibernian	1–1	Kilmarnock	Easter Road, Edinburgh
	Paatelainen 33'		Wright 86'	Attendance: 12,588; Referee: Somers

18 November 2000 SPL	Hibernian	0–2	Aberdeen	Easter Road, Edinburgh
			Stavrum 61'; Mayer 89'	Attendance: 10,995; Referee: Young

25 November 2000 SPL	St Mirren	1–1	Hibernian	Love Street, Paisley
	McGarry 89'		O'Neil 7'	Attendance: 5,255; Referee: McCurry

29 November 2000 SPL	Hibernian	0–0	Celtic	Easter Road, Edinburgh
				Attendance: 14,939; Referee: Dougal

3 December 2000 SPL	Motherwell	1–3	Hibernian	Fir Park, Motherwell
	Elliott 83'		Zitelli 38'; Townsley 48' (og); Zitelli 54'	Attendance: 5,715; Referee: Rowbotham

9 December 2000 SPL	Hibernian	3–0	Dunfermline Athletic	Easter Road, Edinburgh
	Laursen 5'; Zitelli 55'; Paatelainen 69'			Attendance: 10,078; Referee: Clark

16 December 2000 SPL	Hibernian	2–0	St Johnstone	Easter Road, Edinburgh
	Lovell 41'; Paatelainen 74'			Attendance: 10,374; Referee: Dougal

23 December 2000 SPL	Rangers	1–0	Hibernian	Ibrox Stadium, Glasgow
	de Boer 49'			Attendance: 49,993; Referee: Clark

26 December 2000 SPL	Heart of Midlothian	1–1	Hibernian	Tynecastle, Edinburgh
	McSwegan 59'		Lovell 41'	Attendance: 17,619; Referee: Young

30 December 2000 SPL	Hibernian	1–0	Dundee United	Easter Road, Edinburgh
	Latapy 90' (pen)			Attendance: 10,197; Referee: Freeland

2 January 2001 SPL	Hibernian	3–0	Dundee	Easter Road, Edinburgh
	Paatelainen 6'; Fenwick 41'; O'Neil 69'			Attendance: 12,379; Referee: McCurry

30 January 2001 SPL	Kilmarnock	1–1	Hibernian	Rugby Park, Kilmarnock
	Hay 68'		Laursen 87'	Attendance: 6,385; Referee: McCurry

10 February 2001 SPL	Hibernian	4–2	St Mirren	Easter Road, Edinburgh
	Sauzee 17'; Zitelli 59'; Zitelli 61'; Latapy 80'		Gillies 44' (pen); Gillies 51'	Attendance: 8,872; Referee: Toner

25 February 2001 SPL	Celtic	1–1	Hibernian	Celtic Park, Glasgow
	Mjallby 23'		Libbra 84'	Attendance: 60,063; Referee: Dougal

4 March 2001 SPL	Hibernian	1–1	Motherwell	Easter Road, Edinburgh
	Latapy 82'		Strong 81'	Attendance: 9,500; Referee: Clark

13 March 2001 SPL	Aberdeen	1–0	Hibernian	Pittodrie Stadium, Aberdeen
	Guntveit 2'			Attendance: 9,357; Referee: Young

17 March 2001 SPL	Dunfermline Athletic	2–1	Hibernian	East End Park, Dunfermline
	Crawford 29'; Hampshire 57'		Murray 87'	Attendance: 7,547; Referee: Underhill

1 April 2001 SPL	St Johnstone	2–0	Hibernian	McDiarmid Park, Perth
	Lovenkrands 71'; Lovenkrands 74'			Attendance: 4,346; Referee: Dallas

8 April 2001 SPL	Hibernian	0–0	Rangers	Easter Road, Edinburgh
				Attendance: 9,625; Referee: Rowbotham

21 April 2001 SPL	Hibernian	1–1	Kilmarnock	Easter Road, Edinburgh
	Libbra 35'		Cocard 11'	Attendance: 8,224; Referee: Clark

29 April 2001 SPL	Dundee	0–2	Hibernian	Dens Park, Dundee
			Libbra 53'; Zitelli 66'	Attendance: 6,659; Referee: Somers

6 May 2001 SPL	Hibernian	2–5	Celtic	Easter Road, Edinburgh
	Libbra 85'; Libbra 88'		McNamara 5'; McNamara 18'; Larsson 62'; Stubbs 68'; Moravcik 80'	Attendance: 8,728; Referee: Rowbotham

13 May 2001 SPL	Hibernian	0–0	Heart of Midlothian	Easter Road, Edinburgh
				Attendance: 8,913; Referee: Dougal

20 May 2001 SPL	Rangers	4–0	Hibernian	Ibrox Stadium, Glasgow
	Albertz 12' (pen) de Boer 34' de Boer 57'; Vidmar 90'			Attendance: 46,179; Referee: McDonald

=== Final table ===
Pos	Team	Pld	W	D	L	GF	GA	GD	Pts	Qualification or relegation (Note: Teams played each other three times (33 matches), before the league split into two groups (the top six and the bottom six) for the last five matches.)
1	Celtic (C)	38	31	4	3	90	29	+61	97	Qualification for the Champions League third qualifying round
2	Rangers	38	26	4	8	76	36	+40	82	Qualification for the Champions League second qualifying round
3	Hibernian	38	18	12	8	57	35	+22	66	Qualification for the UEFA Cup first round
4	Kilmarnock	38	15	9	14	44	53	−9	54	Qualification for the UEFA Cup qualifying round (Note: As both finalists of the 2000–01 Scottish Cup, Celtic and Hibernian, qualified for European competition via their league position, the cup berth for 2001–02 UEFA Cup was passed to the next-placed team in the league, fourth-placed Kilmarnock.)
5	Heart of Midlothian	38	14	10	14	56	50	+6	52	

Source: Scottish Professional Football League
Rules for classification: 1) Points; 2) Goal difference; 3) Goals scored
(C) Champions

== Scottish League Cup ==
As one of the SPL clubs who failed to qualify for European competition, Hibs entered at the second round stage of the competition, in which they defeated Stenhousemuir 2–1. Another 2–1 win, after extra time against Falkirk, sent Hibs through to a quarter-final against Kilmarnock. In that match, Hibs took an early lead through a Russell Latapy goal, but conceded two second half goals to lose 2–1 and exit the competition.

=== Results ===
22 August 2000 Scottish League Cup	Stenhousemuir	1–2	Hibernian	Ochilview Park, Stenhousemuir
	McKinnon 19'		McManus 23' (pen); Lehmann 62'	Attendance: 1,545; Referee: Smith

6 September 2000 Scottish League Cup	Falkirk	1–2 (a.e.t.)	Hibernian	Brockville Park, Falkirk
	McMahon 74'		Latapy 79'; Latapy 118'	Attendance: 4,292; Referee: Clark

31 October 2000 Scottish League Cup	Kilmarnock	2–1	Hibernian	Rugby Park, Kilmarnock
	McLaren 46'; Dargo 71'		Latapy 2'	Attendance: 7,819; Referee: Dallas

== Scottish Cup ==
=== Results ===
27 January 2001 Scottish Cup	Hibernian	6–1	Clyde	Easter Road, Edinburgh
	Laursen 22'; Jack 28'; Sauzee 45'; Paatelainen 46'; Lehmann 59'; Lehmann 63'		McLaughlin 84'	Attendance: 9,494; Referee: Freeland

17 February 2001 Scottish Cup	Stirling Albion	2–3	Hibernian	Forthbank Stadium, Stirling
	Templeman 4'; Graham 53' (pen)		Sauzee 10'; O'Neil 26'; McManus 78'	Attendance: 3,700; Referee: Rowbotham

10 March 2001 Scottish Cup	Kilmarnock	0–1	Hibernian	Rugby Park, Kilmarnock
			McManus 90'	Attendance: 8,287; Referee: McCurry

14 April 2001 Scottish Cup	Hibernian	3–0	Livingston	Hampden Park, Glasgow
	O'Neil 2'; Zitelli 69'; O'Neil 76'			Attendance: 24,658; Referee: Young

26 May 2001 2001 Scottish Cup Final	Celtic	3–0	Hibernian	Hampden Park, Glasgow
	McNamara 39'; Larsson 48'; Larsson 80' (pen)			Attendance: 51,824; Referee: Clark

== Transfers ==
The only major transfer involving Hibs during the season was the sale of Kenny Miller, Hibs' top goalscorer in the previous season, to Rangers for £2M in total. It was suggested in the media that the fee would be used to finance refurbishments of Easter Road, but the Hibs board denied this and pledged to reinvest in the playing squad. A curious bit of transfer activity involved Didier Agathe, who Hibs signed as a free agent on a short-term contract in the 2000 close season. After a few good performances for Hibs, Agathe was offered the chance to double his salary by Celtic manager Martin O'Neill. This prompted Hibs to sell Agathe to Celtic for the relatively small fee of £50,000, given that the player only had weeks remaining on his contract, and could have signed for Celtic for no transfer fee when it expired.

=== Players in ===
Player	From	Fee
(Denmark) Ulrik Laursen	OB Odense	Free
(Canada) Paul Fenwick	Greenock Morton	Free
(Scotland) John O'Neil	St Johnstone	Free
(Scotland) Gary Smith	Aberdeen	Free
(England) Ian Westwater	Dunfermline Athletic	Free
(France) Hakim Sar-Temsoury	Nantes	Free
(France) Didier Agathe	Raith Rovers	Free
(Trinidad and Tobago) Lyndon Andrews	W Connection	Free
(France) David Zitelli	RC Strasbourg	Free
(France) Frederic Arpinon	Troyes AC	Free

=== Players out ===
Player	To	Fee
(Scotland) Michael Renwick	Ayr United	Free
(Scotland) Paul Lovering	Ayr United	Free
(Scotland) John Hughes	Ayr United	Free
(Scotland) Kenny Miller	Rangers	£2M
(Scotland) Russell Huggon	Dunfermline Athletic	Free
(Scotland) Pat McGinlay	Ayr United	Free
(Scotland) Paul Hartley	St Johnstone	£200,000
(Scotland) Martin Hughes	Stranraer	Free
(France) Didier Agathe	Celtic	£50,000
(Scotland) Shaun Dennis	Raith Rovers	Free
(Scotland) Derek Collins	Preston North End	Free
(Canada) Emilio Bottiglieri	East Fife	Free
(France) Hakim Sar-Temsoury	ESA Brive	Free
(Scotland) Tom Smith	Retired	Free

=== Loans in ===
Player	From
(France) Marc Libbra	Toulouse

=== Loans out ===
Player	To
(Scotland) Emilio Bottiglieri	Partick Thistle
(Scotland) Liam O'Sullivan	Brechin City
(Scotland) Shaun Dennis	Brechin City
(Scotland) Grant Brebner	Stockport County
(Scotland) Tom Phillips	Airdrieonians
(Canada) Emilio Bottiglieri	East Fife
(Scotland) Mark Dempsie	Raith Rovers
(Scotland) Derek Collins	Partick Thistle
(Scotland) Ian Murray	Alloa Athletic
(Scotland) Tam McManus	Airdrieonians
(Scotland) Alan Reid	East Fife
(Scotland) Paul Lindsay	East Stirlingshire
(Scotland) Scott Bannerman	Airdrieonians

== Player stats ==
During the 2000–01 season, Hibs used 27 different players in competitive games. The table below shows the number of appearances and goals scored by each player. None of the players appeared in every match, but goalkeeper Nick Colgan played in all but one of the league matches and in all eight of the cup ties. Gary Smith and Mathias Jack also appeared in 37 league matches, as Hibs fielded a relatively settled side.

No.	Pos	Nat	Player	Total		SPL		Scottish Cup		League Cup	
No.	Pos	Nat	Player	Apps	Goals	Apps	Goals	Apps	Goals	Apps	Goals
	GK	(Republic of Ireland) IRL	Nick Colgan	45	0	37	0	5	0	3	0
	GK	(Canada) CAN	Mike Franks	2	0	2	0	0	0	0	0
	DF	(Scotland) SCO	Derek Collins	3	0	0	0	0	0	3	0
	DF	(Scotland) SCO	Mark Dempsie	1	0	1	0	0	0	0	0
	DF	(Canada) CAN	Paul Fenwick	39	1	31	1	5	0	3	0
	DF	(Denmark) DEN	Ulrik Laursen	35	3	29	2	5	1	1	0
	DF	(Scotland) SCO	Martin McIntosh	7	0	4	0	0	0	3	0
	DF	(France) FRA	Franck Sauzee	39	4	33	2	5	2	1	0
	DF	(Scotland) SCO	Gary Smith	44	0	37	0	5	0	2	0
	DF	(Scotland) SCO	Tom Smith	11	0	8	0	0	0	3	0
	MF	(Trinidad and Tobago) TRI	Lyndon Andrews	14	0	11	0	1	0	2	0
	MF	(France) FRA	Frederic Arpinon	8	0	7	0	1	0	0	0
	MF	(Scotland) SCO	Scott Bannerman	2	0	2	0	0	0	0	0
	MF	(Scotland) SCO	Grant Brebner	17	0	11	0	4	0	2	0
	MF	(Germany) GER	Mathias Jack	43	1	37	0	4	1	2	0
	MF	(Trinidad and Tobago) TRI	Russell Latapy	39	10	33	7	4	0	2	3
	MF	(Australia) AUS	Stuart Lovell	36	5	31	5	3	0	2	0
	MF	(Scotland) SCO	Ian Murray	25	1	21	1	4	0	0	0
	MF	(Scotland) SCO	John O'Neil	40	7	33	4	5	3	2	0
	MF	(France) FRA	Hakim Sar-Temsoury	3	0	1	0	0	0	2	0
	FW	(France) FRA	Didier Agathe	6	4	5	4	0	0	1	0
	FW	(Germany) GER	Dirk Lehmann	33	5	29	2	1	2	3	1
	FW	(France) FRA	Marc Libbra	13	5	10	5	3	0	0	0
	FW	(Scotland) SCO	Tam McManus	20	5	16	2	3	2	1	1
	FW	(Scotland) SCO	Garry O'Connor	1	0	1	0	0	0	0	0
	FW	(Finland) FIN	Mixu Paatelainen	43	12	36	11	5	1	2	0
	FW	(France) FRA	David Zitelli	36	11	30	10	5	1	1	0

== See also ==
- List of Hibernian F.C. seasons
