= 2000–01 Celtic F.C. season =

Celtic
2000–01 season
- Chairman: Brian Quinn
- Manager: Martin O'Neill
- Stadium: Celtic Park
- Scottish Premier League: 1st
- Scottish Cup: Winners
- Scottish League Cup: Winners
- UEFA Cup: Second round
- Top goalscorer: League: Henrik Larsson (35); All: Henrik Larsson (53)
- Highest home attendance: 60,440 vs St Mirren (7 April 2001)
- Lowest home attendance: 31,940 vs Dunfermline Athletic (7 March 2001)
Home colours	Away colours

Celtic played the 2000–01 season in the Scottish Premier League. Martin O'Neill became manager and Celtic won a domestic treble of the three major Scottish trophies: the Scottish League Cup, the Scottish Premier League trophy and the Scottish Cup.

== Review and events ==
=== Management ===
Following the departure of John Barnes in February 2000, Martin O'Neill was appointed as manager of Celtic in June 2000. Kenny Dalglish, who was director of football at Celtic, left the club soon after. John Robertson and Steve Walford followed O'Neill from Leicester City to be assistant manager and coach.

=== League campaign ===
Celtic started their league campaign by going undefeated in 16 games until a heavy defeat to Rangers in November 2000. They lost only two more games, both in May after the league title had been secured. They won the Scottish Premier League with a victory over St Mirren in April, receiving the trophy two weeks later after a 1–0 home win over Hearts, having finished 15 points clear of the runner-up, Rangers, with 97 points.

Striker Henrik Larsson scored 53 goals to set a new Scottish scoring record for a single season.

Key games were:

- Dundee United 1-2 Celtic (30 July) - The opening game of the season which set the standard for the rest of the season
- Celtic 6-2 Rangers (27 August) - The biggest win over rivals Rangers since the Scottish League Cup Final in 1957
- Aberdeen 1-1 Celtic (1 October) - An eight-match winning start to the season ended at Aberdeen but a late equaliser secured a point for Celtic
- Hibernian 0-0 Celtic (29 November) - Celtic ground out a draw after a heavy defeat to Rangers the previous week threatened to derail their season
- Dundee 1-2 Celtic (10 December) - Celtic snatched all the points with a last minute winner despite being out-played for much of the match
- Celtic 1-0 Rangers (11 February) - A narrow win for Celtic was enough to prevent Rangers from resurrecting their title challenge
- Rangers 0-3 Celtic (29 April) - Celtic's first win at Ibrox for six and a half years

=== Cup competitions ===
Celtic beat Raith Rovers, Hearts and Rangers on the way to the Scottish League Cup final at Hampden Park in March 2001. They won the trophy, beating Kilmarnock 3-0 through a second-half hat-trick by Henrik Larsson despite going down to ten men after Chris Sutton was sent off.

In the Scottish Cup, Celtic beat Stranraer, Dunfermline after a replay, Hearts and Dundee United to reach the final in May 2001, where they beat Hibernian 3–0 with a goal from Jackie McNamara and two goals from Henrik Larsson to complete a domestic treble.

=== European campaign ===
Celtic had qualified for the UEFA Cup and began their campaign with an 11-0 aggregate win over Jeunesse Esch from Luxembourg in August 2000. A Chris Sutton goal in extra-time in the away leg was enough to see Celtic through the next round 3–2 on aggregate against HJK Helsinki the following month. They were knocked out in the third round of the competition by Girondins de Bordeaux 2–3 on aggregate despite dominating the second leg in Glasgow.

=== Competition overview ===
Competition	First match	Last match	Starting round	Final position	Record							
Competition	First match	Last match	Starting round	Final position	Pld	W	D	L	GF	GA	GD	Win %
Premiership	30 July 2000	20 May 2001	Round 1	Winners	38	31	4	3	90	29	+61	81.58
League Cup	5 September 2000	18 March 2001	Third round	Winners	4	4	0	0	9	3	+6	100.00
Scottish Cup	28 January 2000	26 May 2001	Third round	Winners	4	3	1	0	10	3	+7	75.00
Europa League	10 August 2000	9 November 2000	Qualifying round	Second Round	6	3	1	2	16	5	+11	50.00
Total					52	41	6	5	125	40	+85	78.85

Source: Competitions

== Competitions ==
=== Scottish Premier League ===
30 July 2000 1	Dundee United	1–2	Celtic	Dundee
18:05 BST	McCracken 49'	BBC Sport	Larsson 4'; Sutton 90'	Stadium: Tannadice Park; Attendance: 11,761; Referee: Hugh Dallas

5 August 2000 2	Celtic	1–0	Motherwell	Glasgow
15:00 BST	Petrov 50'	BBC Sport		Stadium: Celtic Park; Attendance: 58,534; Referee: Alan Freeland

13 August 2000 3	Celtic	2–1	Kilmarnock	Glasgow
15:00 BST	Larsson 50'; Johnson 72'	BBC Sport	McLaren 18'	Stadium: Celtic Park; Attendance: 58,054; Referee: Kenny Clark

19 August 2000 5	Hearts	2–4	Celtic	Edinburgh
15:00 BST	Severin 56'; Juanjo 67'	BBC Sport	Sutton 22', 26'; Larsson 39'; Moravčík 62'	Stadium: Tynecastle Park; Attendance: 16,744; Referee: Willie Young

27 August 2000 6	Celtic	6–2	Rangers	Glasgow
13:00 BST	Sutton 1', 90'; Petrov 8'; Lambert 11'; Larsson 50', 62'	BBC Sport	Reyna 40'; Dodds 55' (pen.)	Stadium: Celtic Park; Attendance: 59,746; Referee: Stuart Dougal

9 September 2000 7	Celtic	3–0	Hibernian	Glasgow
15:00 BST	Larsson 16' (pen.), 45'; Burchill 90'	BBC Sport		Stadium: Celtic Park; Attendance: 60,091; Referee: John Rowbotham

18 September 2000 8	Dunfermline Athletic	1–2	Celtic	Dunfermline
20:00 BST	Crawford 60' (pen.)	BBC Sport	Larsson 62' (pen.), 85'	Stadium: East End Park; Attendance: 9,493; Referee: Willie Young

23 September 2000 9	Celtic	1–0	Dundee	Glasgow
15:00 BST	Petrov 61'	BBC Sport		Stadium: Celtic Park; Attendance: 59,694; Referee: T Brown

1 October 2000 10	Aberdeen	1–1	Celtic	Aberdeen
15:00 BST	Winters 45'	BBC Sport	Larsson 82'	Stadium: Pittodrie Stadium; Attendance: 18,239; Referee: Mike McCurry

14 October 2000 11	Celtic	2–0	St Mirren	Glasgow
15:00 BST	Sutton 33'; Larsson 85'	BBC Sport		Stadium: Celtic Park; Attendance: 60,002; Referee: George Clyde

17 October 2000 4	St Johnstone	0–2	Celtic	Perth
19:45 BST		BBC Sport	Valgaeren 42'; Larsson 86' (pen.)	Stadium: McDiarmid Park; Attendance: 8,946; Referee: John Rowbotham

21 October 2000 12	Celtic	2–1	Dundee United	Glasgow
15:00 BST	Larsson 34'; Thompson 62'	Guardian	Lambert 78' (o.g.)	Stadium: Celtic Park; Attendance: 59,427; Referee: John R. Underhill

29 October 2000 13	Motherwell	3–3	Celtic	Motherwell
18:05 BST	Adams 22'; McCulloch 53'; Brannan 78' (pen.)	BBC Sport	Mjällby 13'; Valgaeren 57'; McNamara 71'	Stadium: Fir Park; Attendance: 10,820; Referee: Hugh Dallas

5 November 2000 14	Kilmarnock	0–1	Celtic	Kilmarnock
14:35 BST		BBC Sport	Thompson 70'	Stadium: Rugby Park; Attendance: 13,417; Referee: Willie Young

12 November 2000 15	Celtic	4–1	St Johnstone	Glasgow
15:00 BST	Sutton 12'; Larsson 34', 59'; Moravčík 37'	BBC Sport	Russell 82'	Stadium: Celtic Park; Attendance: 57,137; Referee: Kevin Toner

18 November 2000 16	Celtic	6–1	Hearts	Glasgow
15:00 BST	Valgaeren 15'; Moravčík 36'; Larsson 39', 81'; Mjällby 44'; Petrov 82'	BBC Sport	Cameron 13'	Stadium: Celtic Park; Attendance: 59,813; Referee: Stuart Dougal

26 November 2000 17	Rangers	5–1	Celtic	Glasgow
13:00 BST	Ferguson 34'; Flo 60' de Boer 68'; Amoruso 76'; Mols 85'	BBC Sport	Larsson 56'	Stadium: Ibrox Stadium; Attendance: 50,083; Referee: Kenny Clark

29 November 2000 18	Hibernian	0–0	Celtic	Glasgow
19:45 BST		BBC Sport		Stadium: Celtic Park; Attendance: 14,939; Referee: Stuart Dougal

2 December 2000 19	Celtic	3–1	Dunfermline Athletic	Glasgow
15:00 BST	Moravčík 7'; Larsson 20'; Johnson 80'	BBC Sport	Dair 1'	Stadium: Celtic Park; Attendance: 59,244; Referee: Mike McCurry

10 December 2000 20	Dundee	1–2	Celtic	Dundee
18:05 BST	Boyd 55' (o.g.)	BBC Sport	Petrov 4'; Agathe 90'	Stadium: Dens Park; Attendance: 10,763; Referee: John Underhill

16 December 2000 21	Celtic	6–0	Aberdeen	Glasgow
15:00 BST	Larsson 4', 76', 78'; Vega 17', 81'; Smith 89'	BBC Sport		Stadium: Celtic Park; Attendance: 60,013; Referee: Dougie McDonald

23 December 2000 22	St Mirren	0–2	Celtic	Paisley
15:00 BST		BBC Sport	Agathe 13'; Larsson 62'	Stadium: St Mirren Park, Love Street; Attendance: 9,487; Referee: Stuart Dougal

26 December 2000 23	Dundee United	0–4	Celtic	Dundee
18:05 BST		BBC Sport	Larsson 22' (pen.); Sutton 34', 40'; Petrov 73'	Stadium: Tannadice Park; Attendance: 12,306; Referee: Hugh Dallas

2 January 2001 24	Celtic	6–0	Kilmarnock	Glasgow
15:00 BST	Sutton 37', 61'; Larsson 53', 69', 72', 86'	BBC Sport		Stadium: Celtic Park; Attendance: 59,380; Referee: David Somers

4 February 2001 25	Hearts	0–3	Celtic	Edinburgh
18:05 BST		BBC Sport	Larsson 4', 68', 83'	Stadium: Tynecastle Park; Attendance: 13,077; Referee: Kenny Clark

11 February 2001 26	Celtic	1–0	Rangers	Glasgow
13:15 BST	Thompson 17'	BBC Sport		Stadium: Celtic Park; Attendance: 59,496; Referee: Hugh Dallas

21 February 2001 27	Celtic	1–0	Motherwell	Glasgow
19:45 BST	Moravčík 70'	BBC Sport		Stadium: Celtic Park; Attendance: 58,880; Referee: John Rowbotham

25 February 2001 28	Celtic	1–1	Hibernian	Glasgow
18:05 BST	Mjällby 70'	BBC Sport	Libbra 84'	Stadium: Celtic Park; Attendance: 60,063; Referee: Stuart Dougal

4 March 2001 29	Dunfermline Athletic	0–3	Celtic	Dunfermline
14:35 BST		BBC Sport	Petrov 11'; Larsson 25'; Lennon 77'	Stadium: East End Park; Attendance: 9,096; Referee: Hugh Dallas

14 March 2001 30	St Johnstone	1–2	Celtic	Perth
20:00 BST	McCluskey 42'	BBC Sport	Johnson 28'; Larsson 61'	Stadium: McDiarmid Park; Attendance: 8,993; Referee: John R. Underhill

1 April 2001 31	Aberdeen	0–1	Celtic	Aberdeen
18:05 BST		BBC Sport	Agathe 73'	Stadium: Pittodrie Stadium; Attendance: 16,067; Referee: Kenny Clark

4 April 2001 32	Celtic	2–1	Dundee	Glasgow
19:45 BST	Johnson 6'; Mjällby 84'	BBC Sport	Sara 67'	Stadium: Celtic Park; Attendance: 59,562; Referee: Dougie McDonald

7 April 2001 33	Celtic	1–0	St Mirren	Glasgow
12:55 BST	Johnson 38'	BBC Sport		Stadium: Celtic Park; Attendance: 60,440; Referee: John R. Underhill

22 April 2001 34	Celtic	1–0	Hearts	Glasgow
18:05 BST	Moravčík 67'	BBC Sport		Stadium: Celtic Park; Attendance: 59,298; Referee: Mike McCurry

29 April 2001 35	Rangers	0–3	Celtic	Glasgow
13:00 BST		BBC Sport	Moravčík 61', 74'; Larsson 87'	Stadium: Ibrox Stadium; Attendance: 50,057; Referee: Stuart Dougal

6 May 2001 36	Hibernian	2–5	Celtic	Edinburgh
15:00 BST	Libbra 85', 88'	BBC Sport	McNamara 4', 18'; Larsson 62'; Stubbs 68'; Moravčík 80'	Stadium: Easter Road; Attendance: 8,728; Referee: John Rowbotham

13 May 2001 37	Celtic	0–2	Dundee	Glasgow
15:00 BST		BBC Sport	Caballero 29', 42'	Stadium: Celtic Park; Attendance: 59,435; Referee: T Brown

20 May 2001 38	Kilmarnock	1–0	Celtic	Kilmarnock
15:00 BST	Mahood 78'	BBC Sport		Stadium: Rugby Park; Attendance: 12,675; Referee: John R. Underhill

=== League Cup ===
5 September 2000 Third round	Celtic	4–0	Raith Rovers	Glasgow
19:45 BST	Sutton 41'; Johnson 44' (pen.), 55'; Thompson 68'	BBC Sport		Stadium: Celtic Park; Attendance: 32,307; Referee: Dougie MacDonald

1 November 2000 Quarter-finals	Hearts	2–5 (a.e.t.)	Celtic	Edinburgh
19:35 GMT	Cameron 36' (pen.), 70' (pen.)	BBC Sport	Crainey 41'; Smith 60'; Healy 99'; Moravčík 106'; McNamara 117'	Stadium: Tynecastle Park; Attendance: 13,076; Referee: Kenny Clark

7 February 2001 Semi-finals	Celtic	3–1	Rangers	Glasgow
19:45 BST	Sutton 6'; Larsson 17', 69' (pen.)	BBC Sport	Albertz 37' (pen.)	Stadium: Hampden Park; Attendance: 50,154; Referee: Willie Young

18 March 2001 Final	Celtic	3–0	Kilmarnock	Glasgow
15:00 BST	Larsson 47', 74', 81'	BBC Sport		Stadium: Hampden Park; Attendance: 48,830; Referee: Hugh Dallas

=== Scottish Cup ===
28 January 2001 Third round	Stranraer	1–4	Celtic	Stranraer
18:05 GMT	Harty 84'	BBC Sport	Valgaeren 23'; McNamara 51'; Knox 55' (o.g.); Moravčík 85'	Stadium: Stair Park; Attendance: 5,600; Referee: Stuart Dougal

17 February 2001 Fourth round	Dunfermline Athletic	2–2	Celtic	Dunfermline
15:00 GMT	Skerla 83'; Nicholson 90'	BBC Sport	Larsson 66', 88'	Stadium: East End Park; Attendance: 11,222; Referee: Willie Young

7 March 2001 Fourth round replay	Celtic	4–1	Dunfermline Athletic	Glasgow
19:45 GMT	Vega 23', 48'; Larsson 61' (pen.), 73' (pen.)	BBC Sport	Thomson 28'	Stadium: Celtic Park; Attendance: 31,940; Referee: Willie Young

11 March 2001 Fifth round	Celtic	1–0	Hearts	Glasgow
14:35 GMT	Larsson 40'	BBC Sport		Stadium: Celtic Park; Attendance: 34,672; Referee: Kenny Clark

15 April 2001 Semi-finals	Celtic	3–1	Dundee United	Glasgow
14:35 GMT	Larsson 32', 79' (pen.); McNamara 80'	BBC Sport	Lilley 84'	Stadium: Hampden Park; Attendance: 38,699; Referee: Hugh Dallas

26 May 2001 Final	Celtic	3–0	Hibernian	Glasgow
15:00 GMT	McNamara 39'; Larsson 48', 80' (pen.)	BBC Sport		Stadium: Hampden Park; Attendance: 51,284; Referee: Kenny Clark

=== UEFA Cup ===
==== Qualifying round ====
10 August 2000 First leg	Jeunesse Esch (Luxembourg)	0–4	(Scotland) Celtic	Luxembourg City, Luxembourg
19:45 GMT		BBC Sport	Moravčík 37', 57'; Larsson 62'; Lambert 80'	Stadium: Stade Josy Barthel; Attendance: 8,920; Referee: Georgios Kasnaferis (Greece)

24 August 2000 Second leg	Celtic (Scotland)	7–0 (11 – 0 agg.)	(Luxembourg) Jeunesse Esch	Glasgow
19:45 GMT	Burchill 12', 14', 15'; Berkovic 20', 46'; Riseth 53'; Petrov 71'	BBC Sport		Stadium: Celtic Park; Attendance: 40,282; Referee: Philippe Leuba (Switzerland)

==== First round ====
14 September 2000 First leg	Celtic (Scotland)	2–0	(Finland) HJK Helsinki	Glasgow
19:45 GMT	Larsson 14', 25'	BBC Sport		Stadium: Celtic Park; Attendance: 40,544; Referee: Dietmar Drabek (Austria)

28 September 2000 Second leg	HJK Helsinki (Finland)	2–1 (a.e.t.) (2–3 agg.)	(Scotland) Celtic	Helsinki, Finland
17:00 GMT	Roiha 42', 76'	BBC Sport	Sutton 108'	Stadium: Finnair Stadium; Attendance: 6,530; Referee: Ladislav Gadosi (Slovakia)

==== Second round ====
26 October 2000 First leg	Bordeaux (France)	1–1	(Scotland) Celtic	Bordeaux, France
19:45 GMT	Dugarry 22'	BBC Sport	Larsson 26' (pen.)	Stadium: Stade Chaban-Delmas; Attendance: 21,318; Referee: Tom Henning Øvrebø (Norway)

9 November 2000 Second leg	Celtic (Scotland)	1–2 (a.e.t.) (2–3 agg.)	(France) Bordeaux	Glasgow
19:45	Moravčík 54'	BBC Sport	Laslandes 79', 114'	Stadium: Celtic Park; Attendance: 54,242; Referee: Sergey Shmolik (Belarus)

== Statistics ==
=== Appearances and goals ===
List of squad players, including number of appearances by competition

No.	Pos	Nat	Player	Total		Premier League		Scottish Cup		League Cup		UEFA Cup	
No.	Pos	Nat	Player	Apps	Goals	Apps	Goals	Apps	Goals	Apps	Goals	Apps	Goals
1	GK	(Scotland) SCO	Jonathan Gould	24	0	15	0	0	0	3	0	6	0
2	DF	(Scotland) SCO	Thomas Boyd	44	0	21+9	0	2+3	0	2+2	0	4+1	0
3	DF	(France) FRA	Stéphane Mahé	13	0	7+3	0	0	0	1	0	2	0
4	DF	(Scotland) SCO	Jackie McNamara	42	7	18+12	3	2+2	3	3	1	5	0
5	DF	(Belgium) BEL	Joos Valgaeren	49	4	35	3	6	1	3	0	5	0
6	DF	(England) ENG	Alan Stubbs	12	1	7+4	1	0	0	1	0	0	0
7	FW	(Sweden) SWE	Henrik Larsson	50	53	37	35	6	9	2	5	5	4
8	MF	(England) ENG	Alan Thompson	32	3	29+1	3	1	0	1	0	0	0
9	FW	(England) ENG	Chris Sutton	35	14	24	11	4	0	3	2	4	1
10	MF	(Israel) ISR	Eyal Berkovic	9	3	2+2	0	0	0	0+1	0	2+2	3
12	FW	(England) ENG	Tommy Johnson	25	7	9+7	5	1+3	0	2+1	2	0+2	0
14	MF	(Scotland) SCO	Paul Lambert	40	1	27	1	4+2	0	2	0	5	0
15	MF	(Netherlands) NED	Bobby Petta	31	1	20	0	2	0	2+2	0	5	1
16	DF	(Ivory Coast) CIV	Olivier Tébily	7	0	2+2	0	0+1	0	0+1	0	1	0
17	MF	(France) FRA	Didier Agathe	35	3	26+1	3	6	0	0	0	2	0
18	MF	(Northern Ireland) NIR	Neil Lennon	25	1	17	1	6	0	2	0	0	0
19	MF	(Bulgaria) BUL	Stiliyan Petrov	38	7	27+1	7	1+2	0	1+1	0	4+1	0
20	GK	(Scotland) SCO	Rab Douglas	28	0	22	0	6	0	0	0	0	0
21	GK	(Scotland) SCO	Stewart Kerr	1	0	0	0	0	0	1	0	0	0
23	GK	(Russia) RUS	Dmitri Kharine	1	0	1	0	0	0	0	0	0	0
24	MF	(Republic of Ireland) IRL	Colin Healy	21	1	4+8	0	0	0	3	1	1+5	0
25	MF	(Slovakia) SVK	Ľubomír Moravčík	40	14	16+11	9	4+1	1	2+1	1	4+1	3
26	MF	(Scotland) SCO	Paul Shields	0	0	0	0	0	0	0	0	0	0
27	FW	(Scotland) SCO	Mark Burchill	4	4	0+2	1	0	0	1	0	1	3
29	FW	(Scotland) SCO	Shaun Maloney	5	0	1+3	0	0	0	1	0	0	0
30	MF	(Norway) NOR	Vidar Riseth	5	1	0+1	0	0	0	1	0	2+1	1
31	DF	(Brazil) BRA	Rafael Scheidt	2	0	0	0	0	0	0+1	0	1	0
32	FW	(Scotland) SCO	Simon Lynch	1	0	0	0	0	0	0	0	1	0
34	MF	(Scotland) SCO	Mark Fotheringham	1	0	1	0	0	0	0	0	0	0
35	DF	(Sweden) SWE	Johan Mjällby	48	4	30+5	4	4+1	0	2	0	6	0
36	DF	(Switzerland) SUI	Ramon Vega	26	4	18	2	6	2	2	0	0	0
38	GK	(Scotland) SCO	Barry John Corr	0	0	0	0	0	0	0	0	0	0
39	MF	(Scotland) SCO	Jamie Smith	9	2	2+5	1	0	0	1+1	1	0	0
40	DF	(Scotland) SCO	Stephen Crainey	5	1	0+2	0	0+1	0	1+1	1	0	0
43	MF	(Republic of Ireland) IRL	Liam Miller	1	0	0	0	0	0	0	0	0+1	0

NB: Players with a zero in every column only appeared as unused substitutes

== Team statistics ==
=== League table ===
Pos	Team	Pld	W	D	L	GF	GA	GD	Pts	Qualification or relegation (Note: Teams played each other three times (33 matches), before the league split into two groups (the top six and the bottom six) for the last five matches.)
1	Celtic (C)	38	31	4	3	90	29	+61	97	Qualification for the Champions League third qualifying round
2	Rangers	38	26	4	8	76	36	+40	82	Qualification for the Champions League second qualifying round
3	Hibernian	38	18	12	8	57	35	+22	66	Qualification for the UEFA Cup first round
4	Kilmarnock	38	15	9	14	44	53	−9	54	Qualification for the UEFA Cup qualifying round (Note: As both finalists of the 2000–01 Scottish Cup, Celtic and Hibernian, qualified for European competition via their league position, the cup berth for 2001–02 UEFA Cup was passed to the next-placed team in the league, fourth-placed Kilmarnock.)
5	Heart of Midlothian	38	14	10	14	56	50	+6	52	

Source: Scottish Professional Football League
Rules for classification: 1) Points; 2) Goal difference; 3) Goals scored
(C) Champions

== Transfers ==
=== In ===
Date	Player	From	Fee
11 July 2000	(England) Chris Sutton	(England) Chelsea	£6,000,000
24 July 2000	(Northern Ireland) Michael McGovern	(Northern Ireland) Enniskillen Town United	Free
28 July 2000	(Belgium) Joos Valgaeren	(Netherlands) Roda JC	£4,800,000
1 September 2000	(England) Alan Thompson	(England) Aston Villa	£2,750,000
1 September 2000	(France) Didier Agathe	(Scotland) Hibernian	£50,000
18 October 2000	(Scotland) Rab Douglas	(Scotland) Dundee	£1,200,000
7 December 2000	(Northern Ireland) Neil Lennon	(England) Leicester City	£5,750,000
15 December 2000	(Switzerland) Ramon Vega	(England) Tottenham Hotspur	Loan

=== Out ===
Date	Player	To	Fee
1 June 2000	(Netherlands) Regi Blinker	(Netherlands) RBC Roosendaal	Free
1 July 2000	(Republic of Ireland) Dave Moore	(Republic of Ireland) Cork City	Free
21 July 2000	(Australia) Mark Viduka	(England) Leeds United	£6,000,000
31 July 2000	(Denmark) Marc Rieper		Retired
15 September 2000	(Brazil) Rafael Scheidt	(Brazil) Corinthians	Loan
22 September 2000	(Scotland) Mark Burchill	(England) Birmingham City	Loan
29 September 2000	(Scotland) Paul Shields	(Scotland) Albion Rovers	Loan
8 November 2000	(Norway) Vidar Riseth	(Germany) 1860 Munich	Loan
1 February 2001	(Venezuela) Fernando de Ornelas	(Hong Kong) South China	Free
8 February 2001	(Israel) Eyal Berkovic	(England) Blackburn Rovers	Loan
21 February 2001	(Scotland) Mark Burchill	(England) Ipswich Town	Loan
1 March 2001	(Scotland) Liam Keogh	(Scotland) Forfar Athletic	Loan
2 March 2001	(Scotland) Barry John Corr	(Scotland) Queen's Park	Loan
20 March 2000	(Norway) Vidar Riseth	(Germany) 1860 Munich	£1,000,000

- Expenditure: ▼£19,900,000
- Income: ▲£7,000,000
- Total loss/gain: ▼£12,900,000

== See also ==
- List of Celtic F.C. seasons
