= 2003–04 Celtic F.C. season =

Celtic
2003–04 season
- Chairman: Brian Quinn
- Manager: Martin O'Neill
- Ground: Celtic Park; Glasgow, Scotland (Capacity: 60,355)
- Scottish Premier League: 1st
- Scottish Cup: Winners
- Scottish League Cup: Quarter-finals
- Champions League: Group stage
- UEFA Cup: Quarter-finals
- Top goalscorer: League: Henrik Larsson (30); All: Henrik Larsson (41)
Home colours	Away colours	Third colours

In season 2003–04 Celtic won a double of the Scottish Premier League championship and the Scottish Cup. They reached the quarter-finals of the Scottish League Cup, and the UEFA Cup after competing in the group stage of the Champions League. They set a new record for the most goals scored in a season – 105 goals.

== Competitions ==
Results for Celtic for season 2003–2004.

NOTE: scores are written Celtic first

Win Draw Loss

Date	Venue	Opponents	Score	Competition	Celtic scorers	Match Report
6 July 2003	Kunghshamn Vallen Stadium	Swedish Amateur XI	7–0	Friendly	Varga, Guppy, Sutton, Petrov, Fernández (2), Wallace	BBC Sport
23 July 2003	Seattle	Manchester United	0–4	Friendly		BBC Sport
30 July 2003	S.Darius and S.Girėnas Stadium	(Lithuania) FBK Kaunas	4–0	CLQ	Larsson, Sutton, Maloney, Miller	BBC Sport
2 August 2003	Celtic Park	Arsenal	1–1	Friendly	Miller	BBC Sport
6 August 2003	Celtic Park	(Lithuania) FBK Kaunas	1–0	CLQ	Gvildys (og)	BBC Sport
9 August 2003	East End Park	Dunfermline	0–0	SPL		BBC Sport
13 August 2003	Hidegkuti Nandor Stadium	(Hungary) MTK Hungária	4–0	CLQ	Larsson, Agathe, Petrov, Sutton	BBC Sport
16 August 2003	Celtic Park	Dundee United	5–0	SPL	Maloney, Agathe, Thompson, McNamara, Larsson	BBC Sport
23 August 2003	Firhill	Partick Thistle	2–1	SPL	Lambert, Thompson	BBC Sport
27 August 2003	Celtic Park	(Hungary) MTK Hungária	1–0	CLQ	Sutton	BBC Sport
30 August 2003	Celtic Park	Livingston	5–1	SPL	Larsson (3), Maloney, Thompson	BBC Sport
13 September 2003	Dens Park	Dundee	1–0	SPL	Balde	BBC Sport
17 September 2003	Olympic Stadium (Munich)	(Germany) Bayern Munich	1–2	CLA	Thompson	BBC Sport
20 September 2003	Celtic Park	Motherwell	3–0	SPL	Larsson, Sutton, Maloney	BBC Sport
27 September 2003	Easter Road	Hibernian	2–1	SPL	Thompson, Larsson	BBC Sport
30 September 2003	Celtic Park	(France) Lyon	2–0	CLA	Miller, Sutton	BBC Sport
4 October 2003	Ibrox	Rangers	1–0	SPL	Hartson	BBC Sport
18 October 2003	Celtic Park	Heart of Midlothian	5–0	SPL	Miller (2), Varga, Larsson, Stamp (og)	BBC Sport
21 October 2003	Constant Vanden Stock Stadium	(Belgium) Anderlecht	0–1	CLA		BBC Sport
25 October 2003	Celtic Park	Aberdeen	4–0	SPL	Larsson (3), Sutton	BBC Sport
1 November 2003	Rugby Park	Kilmarnock	5–0	SPL	Sutton (3), Hartson, Maloney	BBC Sport
5 November 2003	Celtic Park	(Belgium) Anderlecht	3–1	CLA	Larsson, Miller, Sutton	BBC Sport
8 November 2003	Celtic Park	Dunfermline Athletic	5–0	SPL	Hartson (2), Wallace, Varga, Larsson	BBC Sport
22 November 2003	Tannadice	Dundee Utd	5–1	SPL	Sutton (3), Larsson (2)	BBC Sport
25 November 2003	Celtic Park	(Germany) Bayern Munich	0–0	CLA		BBC Sport
29 November 2003	Celtic Park	Partick Thistle	3–1	SPL	Larsson, Sutton (2),	BBC Sport
4 December 2003	Firhill	Partick Thistle	2–0	SLC	Beattie, Smith	BBC Sport
6 December 2003	Almondvale Stadium	Livingston	2–0	SPL	Sutton, Thompson	BBC Sport
10 December 2003	Stade de Gerland	(France) Lyon	2–3	CLA	Hartson, Sutton	BBC Sport
13 December 2003	Celtic Park	Dundee	3–2	SPL	Larsson, Balde, Kennedy	BBC Sport
18 December 2003	Easter Road	Hibernian	1–2	SLC	Varga	BBC Sport
21 December 2003	Fir Park	Motherwell	2–0	SPL	Hartson, Thompson	BBC Sport
27 December 2003	Celtic Park	Hibernian	6–0	SPL	Sutton (2), Hartson (2), Larsson, Petrov	BBC Sport
3 January 2004	Celtic Park	Rangers	3–0	SPL	Petrov, Varga, Thompson	BBC Sport
10 January 2004	Celtic Park	Ross County	2–0	SC	Hartson, Lambert	BBC Sport
18 January 2004	Tynecastle Stadium	Heart of Midlothian	1–0	SPL	Petrov	BBC Sport
24 January 2004	Pittodrie Stadium	Aberdeen	3–1	SPL	Petrov, Larsson, Pearson	BBC Sport
31 January 2004	Celtic Park	Kilmarnock	5–1	SPL	Agathe, Hartson (2), Larsson, Pearson	BBC Sport
7 February 2004	Tynecastle	Heart of Midlothian	3–0	SC	Petrov (2), Larsson	BBC Sport
11 February 2004	East End Park	Dunfermline Athletic	4–1	SPL	Larsson (2), Varga, Thompson	BBC Sport
14 February 2004	Celtic Park	Dundee Utd	2–1	SPL	Maloney, Sutton	BBC Sport
22 February 2004	Firhill	Partick Thistle	4–1	SPL	Sutton (2), Varga (2)	BBC Sport
26 February 2004	Celtic Park	(Czech Republic) FK Teplice	3–0	UC	Larsson (2), Sutton	BBC Sport
29 February 2004	Celtic Park	Livingston	5–1	SPL	Pearson, Sutton, Thompson (2), Larsson	BBC Sport
3 March 2004	Na Stinadlech	(Czech Republic) FK Teplice	0–1	UC		BBC Sport
7 March 2004	Celtic Park	Rangers	1–0	SC	Larsson	BBC Sport
10 March 2004	Celtic Park	(Spain) Barcelona	1–0	UC	Thompson	BBC Sport
14 March 2004	Celtic Park	Motherwell	1–1	SPL	Larsson	BBC Sport
17 March 2004	Dens Park	Dundee	2–1	SPL	Petrov, Larsson	BBC Sport
21 March 2004	Easter Road	Hibernian	4–0	SPL	Agathe (2), Larsson (2)	BBC Sport
24 March 2004	Nou Camp	(Spain) Barcelona	0–0	UC		BBC Sport
28 March 2004	Ibrox	Rangers	2–1	SPL	Larsson, Thompson	BBC Sport
3 April 2004	Celtic Park	Heart of Midlothian	2–2	SPL	Sutton, Agathe	BBC Sport
8 April 2004	Celtic Park	(Spain) Villarreal	1–1	UC	Larsson	BBC Sport
11 April 2004	Hampden Park	Livingston	3–1	SC	Sutton (2), Larsson	BBC Sport
14 April 2004	El Madrigal	(Spain) Villarreal	0–2	UC		BBC Sport
18 April 2004	Rugby Park	Kilmarnock	1–0	SPL	Petrov	BBC Sport
21 April 2004	Celtic Park	Aberdeen	1–2	SPL	Larsson	BBC Sport
25 April 2004	Tynecastle	Heart of Midlothian	1–1	SPL	McGeady	BBC Sport
2 May 2004	Celtic Park	Dunfermline Athletic	1–2	SPL	Larsson	BBC Sport
8 May 2004	Celtic Park	Rangers	1–0	SPL	Sutton	BBC Sport
12 May 2004	Fir Park	Motherwell	1–1	SPL	Beattie	BBC Sport
16 May 2004	Celtic Park	Dundee Utd	2–1	SPL	Larsson (2)	BBC Sport
22 May 2004	Hampden Park	Dunfermline Athletic	3–1	SC	Larsson (2), Petrov	BBC Sport
25 May 2004	Celtic Park	(Spain) Sevilla	1–0	Friendly	Sutton	BBC Sport

Key:

- SPL = Scottish Premier League
- SC = Scottish Cup
- SLC = Scottish League Cup
- CLQ = Champions League Qualifier
- CLA – Champions League Group A
- CL = Champions League Match
- UC = UEFA Cup match
- F = Friendly match

== Squad ==
Note: Flags indicate national team as defined under FIFA eligibility rules; some limited exceptions apply. Players may hold more than one non-FIFA nationality.

No.	Pos.	Nation	Player
3	MF	GUI	Mohammed Sylla
4	DF	SCO	Jackie McNamara
5	DF	BEL	Joos Valgaeren
6	DF	GUI	Bobo Baldé
7	FW	SWE	Henrik Larsson
8	MF	ENG	Alan Thompson
9	FW	ENG	Chris Sutton
10	FW	WAL	John Hartson
11	MF	SCO	Stephen Pearson (from January)
12	FW	ESP	David Fernandez
14	MF	SCO	Paul Lambert
15	MF	NED	Bobby Petta
16	DF	DEN	Ulrik Laursen
17	DF	FRA	Didier Agathe
18	MF	NIR	Neil Lennon
19	MF	BUL	Stiliyan Petrov

No.	Pos.	Nation	Player
20	GK	SCO	Rab Douglas
21	GK	SWE	Magnus Hedman
22	GK	SCO	David Marshall
23	DF	SVK	Stanislav Varga
29	FW	SCO	Shaun Maloney
33	MF	SCO	Ross Wallace
35	DF	SWE	Johan Mjallby
37	FW	SCO	Craig Beattie
39	MF	SCO	Jamie Smith
41	DF	SCO	John Kennedy
43	MF	IRL	Liam Miller
44	DF	SCO	Stephen McManus
45	MF	SCO	Kevin McBride
46	MF	IRL	Aiden McGeady
47	GK	NIR	Michael McGovern

== Player statistics ==
=== Appearances and goals ===
List of squad players, including number of appearances by competition

No.	Pos	Nat	Player	Total		Premier League		Scottish Cup		League Cup		Europe	
No.	Pos	Nat	Player	Apps	Goals	Apps	Goals	Apps	Goals	Apps	Goals	Apps	Goals
2	DF	(England) ENG	Michael Gray	10	0	2+5	0	0	0	1	0	1+1	0
3	DF	(Guinea) GUI	Mohammed Sylla	24	0	5+9	0	0+1	0	1	0	1+7	0
4	DF	(Scotland) SCO	Jackie McNamara	43	1	26+1	1	4	0	1	0	11	0
5	DF	(Belgium) BEL	Joos Valgaeren	16	0	4+3	0	2	0	0	0	4+3	0
6	DF	(Guinea) GUI	Dianbobo Balde	50	2	30+1	2	4	0	1	0	14	0
7	FW	(Sweden) SWE	Henrik Larsson	58	41	36+1	30	5	5	1	0	15	6
8	MF	(England) ENG	Alan Thompson	44	13	26	11	4	0	1	0	13	2
9	FW	(England) ENG	Chris Sutton	44	28	25	19	4	2	1	0	14	7
10	FW	(Wales) WAL	John Hartson	23	10	14+1	8	1	1	0	0	6+1	1
11	MF	(Scotland) SCO	Stephen Pearson	28	3	16+1	3	4+1	0	0	0	5+1	0
12	FW	(Spain) ESP	David Fernández	0	0	0	0	0	0	0	0	0	0
14	MF	(Scotland) SCO	Paul Lambert	22	2	9+4	1	1	1	2	0	6	0
15	MF	(Netherlands) NED	Bobby Petta	1	0	0	0	0	0	0	0	0+1	0
16	DF	(Denmark) DEN	Ulrik Laursen	1	0	0	0	0	0	0+1	0	0	0
17	DF	(France) FRA	Didier Agathe	46	6	26+1	5	5	0	0	0	14	1
18	MF	(Northern Ireland) NIR	Neil Lennon	53	0	35	0	5	0	0	0	12+1	0
19	MF	(Bulgaria) BUL	Stiliyan Petrov	55	10	33+2	6	4+1	3	0	0	15	1
20	GK	(Scotland) SCO	Rab Douglas	26	0	15+1	0	3	0	1	0	6	0
21	GK	(Sweden) SWE	Magnus Hedman	19	0	12	0	0	0	0	0	7	0
22	GK	(Scotland) SCO	David Marshall	18	0	11	0	2	0	1	0	3+1	0
23	DF	(Slovakia) SVK	Stanislav Varga	55	7	35	6	4	0	1	1	15	0
29	FW	(Scotland) SCO	Shaun Maloney	23	6	7+10	5	1	0	1+1	0	1+2	1
33	MF	(Scotland) SCO	Ross Wallace	14	1	4+4	1	1+1	0	1	0	0+3	0
35	DF	(Sweden) SWE	Johan Mjallby	18	0	10+3	0	0+1	0	1	0	3	0
37	FW	(Scotland) SCO	Craig Beattie	17	2	2+8	1	0+3	0	1+1	1	1+1	0
39	MF	(Scotland) SCO	Jamie Smith	15	1	4+7	0	0	0	1	1	1+2	0
40	DF	(Scotland) SCO	Stephen Crainey	6	0	1+1	0	0	0	2	0	1+1	0
41	DF	(Scotland) SCO	John Kennedy	20	1	9+3	1	1+1	0	2	0	2+2	0
43	MF	(Republic of Ireland) IRL	Liam Miller	40	5	13+12	2	0+1	0	1	0	5+8	3
44	DF	(Scotland) SCO	Stephen McManus	5	0	5	0	0	0	0	0	0	0
45	MF	(Scotland) SCO	Kevin McBride	0	0	0	0	0	0	0	0	0	0
46	MF	(Republic of Ireland) IRL	Aiden McGeady	4	1	3+1	1	0	0	0	0	0	0

== Team statistics ==
=== League table ===
Pos	Team	Pld	W	D	L	GF	GA	GD	Pts	Qualification or relegation (Note: Teams played each other three times (33 matches), before the league split into two groups (the top six and the bottom six) for the last five matches.)
1	Celtic (C)	38	31	5	2	105	25	+80	98	Qualification for the Champions League group stage
2	Rangers	38	25	6	7	76	33	+43	81	Qualification for the Champions League third qualifying round
3	Heart of Midlothian	38	19	11	8	56	40	+16	68	Qualification for the UEFA Cup first round (Note: As Celtic, the 2003–04 Scottish Cup winners, qualified for the UEFA Champions League via their league position, the place in the UEFA Cup was passed onto Dunfermline Athletic, the cup runners-up.)
4	Dunfermline Athletic	38	14	11	13	45	52	−7	53	Qualification for the UEFA Cup first round
5	Dundee United	38	13	10	15	47	60	−13	49	

Source: Scottish Professional Football League
Rules for classification: 1) Points; 2) Goal difference; 3) Goals scored
(C) Champions

== Transfers ==
=== In ===
Date	Player	From	Fee
31 August 2003	(England) Michael Gray	(England) Sunderland	Loan
9 January 2004	(Scotland) Stephen Pearson	(Scotland) Motherwell	£350,000
30 January 2004	(Australia) Danny Milosevic	(England) Leeds United	Loan

=== Out ===
Date	Player	To	Fee
12 June 2003	(Scotland) Tom Boyd		Retired
13 June 2003	(Republic of Ireland) Colin Healy		Free
5 July 2003	(Spain) Javier Sánchez Broto		Free
24 August 2003	(Scotland) Mark Fotheringham	(Scotland) Dundee	Free
30 August 2003	(Spain) David Fernández	(Scotland) Livingston	Loan
31 December 2003	(Netherlands) Bobby Petta	(England) Fulham	Loan
15 January 2004	(England) Steve Guppy	(England) Leicester City	Free
28 January 2004	(Sweden) Magnus Hedman	(Italy) Ancona	Loan
30 January 2004	(Scotland) Stephen Crainey	(England) Southampton	£500,000

- Expenditure: ▼£350,000
- Income: ▲£500,000
- Total loss/gain: ▲£150,000

== See also ==
- List of Celtic F.C. seasons
