= 2001 Scottish Cup final =

2001 Scottish Cup Final
- Event: 2000–01 Scottish Cup
Celtic	Hibernian
3	0
- Date: 26 May 2001
- Venue: Hampden Park, Glasgow
- Man of the Match: Henrik Larsson
- Referee: Kenny Clark
- Attendance: 51,824

The 2001 Scottish Cup Final was played on 26 May 2001 at Hampden Park in Glasgow and was the final of the 116th Scottish Cup competition. Celtic and Hibernian contested the match, which Celtic won 3–0, completing the third domestic treble in the club's history. Jackie McNamara opened the scoring in the first half running onto a through ball to angle the ball past Hibernian goalkeeper Nick Colgan. In the second half Henrik Larsson scored twice, with a penalty and a hard shot into the top corner.

== Match details ==
26 May 2001

Celtic	3–0	Hibernian
McNamara 39'; Larsson 48', 80' (pen.)	Report

Hampden Park, Glasgow
Attendance: 51,824
Referee: Kenny Clark

CELTIC:
GK	20	(Scotland) Robert Douglas
DF	35	(Sweden) Johan Mjällby
DF	36	(Switzerland) Ramon Vega
DF	5	(Belgium) Joos Valgaeren
MF	17	(France) Didier Agathe
MF	18	(Northern Ireland) Neil Lennon
MF	14	(Scotland) Paul Lambert (c)	(substituted off) 78'
MF	25	(Slovakia) Ľubomír Moravčík	(substituted off) 18'
MF	8	(England) Alan Thompson	(substituted off) 88'
FW	7	(Sweden) Henrik Larsson
FW	9	(England) Chris Sutton
Substitutes:
GK	1	(Scotland) Jonathan Gould
DF	6	(England) Alan Stubbs
DF	4	(Scotland) Jackie McNamara	(substituted on) 18'
DF	2	(Scotland) Tom Boyd	(substituted on) 78'
FW	12	(England) Tommy Johnson	(substituted on) 88'
Manager:
(Northern Ireland) Martin O'Neill

HIBERNIAN:
GK	1	(Republic of Ireland) Nick Colgan
DF	18	(Scotland) Gary Smith
DF	4	(France) Franck Sauzée (c)
DF	14	(Canada) Paul Fenwick
DF	3	(Denmark) Ulrik Laursen
MF	11	(Scotland) John O'Neil
MF	19	(Germany) Mathias Jack
MF	8	(Scotland) Grant Brebner	(substituted off) 61'
MF	26	(Scotland) Ian Murray
FW	21	(France) Marc Libbra
FW	9	(Finland) Mixu Paatelainen	(substituted off) 69'
Substitutes:
GK	13	(England) Ian Westwater
MF	10	(France) Frederic Arpinon	(substituted on) 61'	(substituted off) 81'
MF	7	(Australia) Stuart Lovell		(substituted on) 81'
FW	20	(France) David Zitelli	(substituted on) 69'
FW	16	(Germany) Dirk Lehmann
Manager:
(Scotland) Alex McLeish
