= 2000–01 in Scottish football =

Football in Scotland
- Season: 2000–01

2000–01 in Scottish football

Premier League champions
- Celtic

First Division champions
- Livingston

Second Division champions
- Partick Thistle

Third Division champions
- Hamilton Academical

Scottish Cup winners
- Celtic

League Cup winners
- Celtic

Challenge Cup winners
- Airdrieonians

Junior Cup winners
- Renfrew

Teams in Europe
- Aberdeen, Celtic, Hearts, Rangers

Scotland national team
- 2002 World Cup qualification

The 2000–01 season was the 104th season of competitive football in Scotland.

== League Competitions ==
=== Scottish Premier League ===
The 2000–01 Scottish Premier League was won by Celtic, 15 points clear of Rangers who finished second. Both teams earned a place in the UEFA Champions League. Hibernian and Kilmarnock finished third and fourth and both therefore earned UEFA Europa League berths. St Mirren were relegated in their first season in the top-flight since the 1991–92 season.

Pos	Team	Pld	W	D	L	GF	GA	GD	Pts	Qualification or relegation (Note: Teams played each other three times (33 matches), before the league split into two groups (the top six and the bottom six) for the last five matches.)
1	Celtic (C)	38	31	4	3	90	29	+61	97	Qualification for the Champions League third qualifying round
2	Rangers	38	26	4	8	76	36	+40	82	Qualification for the Champions League second qualifying round
3	Hibernian	38	18	12	8	57	35	+22	66	Qualification for the UEFA Cup first round
4	Kilmarnock	38	15	9	14	44	53	−9	54	Qualification for the UEFA Cup qualifying round (Note: As both finalists of the 2000–01 Scottish Cup, Celtic and Hibernian, qualified for European competition via their league position, the cup berth for 2001–02 UEFA Cup was passed to the next-placed team in the league, fourth-placed Kilmarnock.)
5	Heart of Midlothian	38	14	10	14	56	50	+6	52	
6	Dundee	38	13	8	17	51	49	+2	47	Qualification for the UEFA Intertoto Cup first round (Note: Dundee qualified for the 2001 UEFA Intertoto Cup as the highest-placed team to apply for a place in the competition.)
7	Aberdeen	38	11	12	15	45	52	−7	45	
8	Motherwell	38	12	7	19	42	56	−14	43	
9	Dunfermline Athletic	38	11	9	18	34	54	−20	42	
10	St Johnstone	38	9	13	16	40	56	−16	40	
11	Dundee United	38	9	8	21	38	63	−25	35	
12	St Mirren (R)	38	8	6	24	32	72	−40	30	Relegation to the First Division

Source: Scottish Professional Football League
Rules for classification: 1) Points; 2) Goal difference; 3) Goals scored
(C) Champions; (R) Relegated

=== Scottish First Division ===
Pos	Team	Pld	W	D	L	GF	GA	GD	Pts	Promotion or relegation
1	Livingston (C, P)	36	23	7	6	72	31	+41	76	Promotion to the Premier League
2	Ayr United	36	19	12	5	73	41	+32	69	
3	Falkirk	36	16	8	12	57	59	−2	56	
4	Inverness CT	36	14	12	10	71	54	+17	54	
5	Clyde	36	11	14	11	44	46	−2	47	
6	Ross County	36	11	10	15	48	52	−4	43	
7	Raith Rovers	36	10	8	18	41	55	−14	38	
8	Airdrieonians	36	8	14	14	49	67	−18	38	
9	Greenock Morton (R)	36	9	8	19	34	61	−27	35	Relegation to the Second Division
10	Alloa Athletic (R)	36	7	11	18	38	61	−23	32	Relegation to the Second Division

Source: "2000-2001 First Division - SPFL Archive". SPFL.
Rules for classification: 1) points; 2) goal difference; 3) number of goals scored.
(C) Champions; (P) Promoted; (R) Relegated

=== Scottish Second Division ===
Pos	Team	Pld	W	D	L	GF	GA	GD	Pts	Promotion or relegation
1	Partick Thistle (C, P)	36	22	9	5	66	32	+34	75	Promotion to the First Division
2	Arbroath (P)	36	15	13	8	54	38	+16	58	Promotion to the First Division
3	Berwick Rangers	36	14	12	10	51	44	+7	54	
4	Stranraer	36	15	9	12	51	50	+1	54	
5	Clydebank	36	12	11	13	42	43	−1	47	
6	Queen of the South	36	13	7	16	52	59	−7	46	
7	Stenhousemuir	36	12	6	18	45	63	−18	42	
8	Forfar Athletic	36	10	10	16	48	52	−4	40	
9	Queens Park (R)	36	10	10	16	28	40	−12	40	Relegation to the Third Division
10	Stirling Albion (R)	36	5	17	14	34	50	−16	32	Relegation to the Third Division

Source: "2000-2001 Second Division - SPFL Archive". SPFL.
Rules for classification: 1) points; 2) goal difference; 3) number of goals scored.
(C) Champions; (P) Promoted; (R) Relegated

=== Scottish Third Division ===
Pos	Team	Pld	W	D	L	GF	GA	GD	Pts	Promotion
1	Hamilton Academical (C, P)	36	22	10	4	75	41	+34	76	Promotion to the Second Division
2	Cowdenbeath (P)	36	23	7	6	58	31	+27	76	Promotion to the Second Division
3	Brechin City	36	22	6	8	71	36	+35	72	
4	East Fife	36	15	8	13	49	46	+3	53	
5	Peterhead	36	13	10	13	46	46	0	49	
6	Dumbarton	36	13	6	17	46	49	−3	45	
7	Albion Rovers	36	12	9	15	38	43	−5	45	
8	East Stirlingshire	36	10	7	19	37	69	−32	37	
9	Montrose	36	6	8	22	31	65	−34	26	
10	Elgin City	36	5	7	24	29	65	−36	22	

Source: "2000-2001 Third Division - SPFL Archive". SPFL (in Malay).
Rules for classification: 1) points; 2) goal difference; 3) number of goals scored.
(C) Champions; (P) Promoted

== Other honours ==
=== Cup honours ===
Competition	Winner	Score	Runner-up	Report
Scottish Cup 2000–01	Celtic	3 – 0	Hibernian	Wikipedia article
League Cup 2000–01	Celtic	3 – 0	Kilmarnock	BBC Sport
Challenge Cup 2000–01	Airdrieonians	2 – 2 (3 – 2 pen.)	Livingston	BBC Sport
Youth Cup	Aberdeen	2 – 0	Celtic	
Junior Cup	Renfrew	0 – 0 (6 – 5 pen.)	Carnoustie Panmure	BBC Sport

=== Individual honours ===
==== SPFA awards ====
Award	Winner	Club
Players' Player of the Year	(Sweden) Henrik Larsson	Celtic
Young Player of the Year	(Bulgaria) Stiliyan Petrov	Celtic

=== SWFA awards ===
Award	Winner	Club
Footballer of the Year	(Sweden) Henrik Larsson	Celtic
Manager of the Year	(Northern Ireland) Martin O'Neill	Celtic

== Scottish clubs in Europe ==
Club	Competition(s)	Final round	Coef.
Rangers	UEFA Champions League; UEFA Europa League	Group stage Third round	12.50
Celtic	UEFA Europa League	Second round	5.00
Heart of Midlothian	UEFA Europa League	First round	4.00
Aberdeen	UEFA Europa League	Qualifying round	1.00

Average coefficient – 5.625

== Scotland national team ==
Date	Venue	Opponents	Score	Competition	Scotland scorer(s)	Report
2 September	Skonto stadions, Riga (A)	Latvia	1–0	WCQG6	Neil McCann	BBC Sport
7 October	Stadio Olimpico, Serravalle (A)	San Marino	2–0	WCQG6	Matt Elliott, Don Hutchison	BBC Sport
11 October	Maksimir Stadium, Zagreb (A)	Croatia	1–1	WCQG6	Kevin Gallacher	BBC Sport
15 November	Hampden Park, Glasgow (H)	Australia	0–2	Friendly		BBC Sport
24 March	Hampden Park, Glasgow (H)	Belgium	2–2	WCQG6	Billy Dodds (2)	BBC Sport
28 March	Hampden Park, Glasgow (H)	San Marino	4–0	WCQG6	Colin Hendry (2), Billy Dodds, Colin Cameron	BBC Sport
25 April	Zawisza Bydgoszcz stadium, Bydgoszcz (A)	Poland	1–1	Friendly	Scott Booth (pen.)	BBC Sport

Key:

- (A) = Away match
- (H) = Home match
- WCQG6 = World Cup Qualifying – Group 6
