= Buttigliera =

Buttigliera may refer to:

- Buttigliera Alta, populated place in Piedmont, Italy
- Buttigliera d'Asti, populated place in Piedmont, Italy

== See also ==
- Bottiglieri
