= Bottiglieri =

Bottiglieri is an Italian surname. Notable people with the surname include:

- Emilio Bottiglieri (born 1979), Canadian soccer player
- Matteo Bottiglieri (1684–1757), Italian sculptor and painter
- Rita Bottiglieri (born 1953), Italian pentathlete
