= Nick Colgan =

Irish footballer and coach (born 1973)

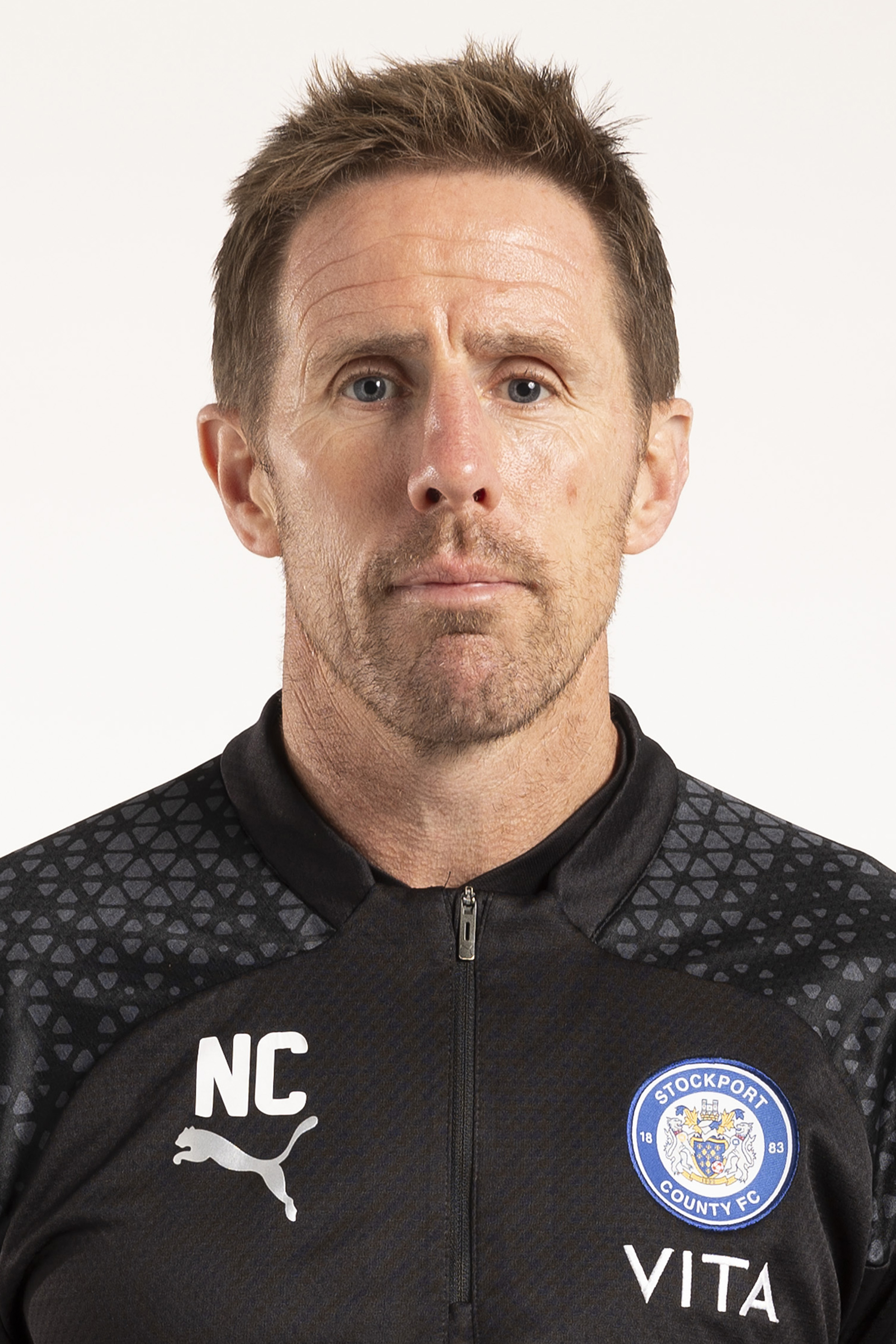
- Colgan with Stockport County in 2023

Personal information
- Full name: Nicholas Vincent Colgan
- Date of birth: 19 September 1973 (age 53)
- Place of birth: Drogheda, Ireland
- Height: 6 ft 1 in (1.85 m)
- Position: Goalkeeper

Senior career*
Years	Team	Apps	(Gls)
1991–1992	Drogheda United	?	(?)
1992–1998	Chelsea	1	(0)
1993	→ Crewe Alexandra (loan)	0	(0)
1994	→ Grimsby Town (loan)	0	(0)
1995	→ Millwall (loan)	0	(0)
1997	→ Brentford (loan)	5	(0)
1998	→ Reading (loan)	5	(0)
1998–1999	AFC Bournemouth	0	(0)
1999–2004	Hibernian	121	(0)
2003–2004	→ Stockport County (loan)	15	(0)
2004–2008	Barnsley	104	(0)
2005	→ Dundee United (loan)	1	(0)
2008	Ipswich Town	0	(0)
2008–2009	Sunderland	0	(0)
2009–2011	Grimsby Town	35	(0)
2010	→ Huddersfield Town (loan)	0	(0)
2011–2013	Huddersfield Town	0	(0)
Total		287	(0)

International career
2002–2007	Republic of Ireland	9	(0)
- * Club domestic league appearances and goals

Nicholas Vincent Colgan (born 19 September 1973) is an Irish football coach and former professional footballer who was mostly recently the goalkeeping coach at EFL League One side Stockport County.

As a player, he was a goalkeeper from 1991 to 2013 and first briefly played for his hometown club Drogheda United between 1991 and 1992 before signing for Premier League side Chelsea. Whilst at Stamford Bridge he often found himself as back-up to the likes of Dmitri Kharine and Frode Grodas and spent time on loan at Crewe Alexandra, Grimsby Town, Millwall, Brentford and Reading. He joined AFC Bournemouth permanently in 1998 where he stayed for a year before a move to Scottish Premier League club Hibernian. Colgan made over 120 appearances in the league between 1999 and 2004 and went on to earn his first full international cap for the Republic of Ireland. In 2004 following a loan spell with Stockport County he joined Barnsley where he played for four years and also helping the club to promotion to the Football League Championship in 2006. In 2008, he joined Ipswich Town as an understudy to Stephen Bywater but left the club a few months later after failing to make an appearance, and with that returned to the Premier League when he joined Sunderland. A year later he returned to Grimsby Town and was the first choice keeper when the club were to lose their Football League following relegation to the Conference. Colgan lost his place in the team the following year and was loaned out to Huddersfield Town before later making the move permanent.

During the 2011–12 season Colgan began coaching youngsters back at former club Barnsley as well as continuing to play with Huddersfield. In July 2012 he signed a new contract with Huddersfield to make him the club's academy goalkeeping coach as well as still making himself available as a player.

== Club career ==
=== Drogheda United ===
Born in Drogheda, County Louth, Nick Colgan began his football career with his hometown club Drogheda United in 1991. He remained at United Park for one season as a professional while he was scouted by overseas clubs. This would eventually see Nick Colgan depart United and move to England.

=== Chelsea ===
Colgan signed professional terms with Chelsea, who at the time were a founding club of the newly designed FA Premier League in the summer of 1992, although he had appeared in their youth team 6 times in 1990/91, becoming their regular goalkeeper for the following season. The Blues were managed at the time by Ian Porterfield and Colgan was designated as the third choice keeper at Stamford Bridge behind Dmitri Kharine and Kevin Hitchcock. In February 1993, Porterfield was sacked and was replaced by player-manager Glenn Hoddle, who in turn put Colgan up for loan. In September 1993, Colgan was signed by Dario Gradi in a one-month loan spell with Crewe Alexandra, however he failed to make an appearance for the club and soon returned to Stamford Bridge. During the 1994–1995 season joined up with Alan Buckley at Grimsby Town who used him as a deputy keeper to Paul Crichton, but also Colgan went unused at Blundell Park during his spell in Humberside. During the 1995–1996 campaign, Colgan joined London city rivals Millwall on a further loan deal but he again failed to make a first team appearance. For the 1996–1997 season, Hoddle was replaced by Ruud Gullit who handed Colgan his first team professional debut playing in a 3–2 away defeat at the hands of West Ham United on 12 March 1997. Colgan had filled in for the then current first choice Frode Grodas who sat the game out on the bench. The Chelsea team that day featured the likes of Gianfranco Zola, Gianluca Vialli, Dan Petrescu, Dennis Wise and Mark Hughes. That season Chelsea won the 1996–97 FA Cup. Colgan was on the bench in the semi-final against Wimbledon but for the match day squad of the final Kevin Hitchcock was on the bench instead of Colgan. The West Hame game would be his only taste of first team football for Chelsea, however he would go on to make 5 loan appearances each for both Brentford and Reading during the 1997–1998 season. In the summer of 1998, Chelsea now managed by Gianluca Vialli released Colgan from the club.

=== AFC Bournemouth ===
In July 1998, fresh from his release from Chelsea, Colgan signed on a free transfer for AFC Bournemouth. Colgan would make not one single appearance for the club during his only season at Dean Court, with him playing second fiddle to Mark Ovendale for the entire season.

=== Hibernian ===
During the summer of 1999, Colgan signed with Scottish Premier League club Hibernian. His first season at Easter Road he made 31 appearances for the club, and was looked upon as the first choice keeper in a side that boasted Olafur Gottskalksson and John Campbell. He went on to make a total of 147 appearances in all competitions between joining in 1999 and his departure in the summer of 2004. During the 2003–2004 season, Colgan was loaned out, where he spent most of the season with Stockport County. County were under a squad re-shuffle that had seen them use Lee Jones, James Spencer, Boaz Myhill, Anthony Williams and Colgan in the net that season. At the end of the season, Colgan was linked with a permanent move to Stockport but the transfer never materialised.

=== Barnsley ===
In the summer of 2004, Colgan signed for Barnsley, where he endured a tough first season only playing in 15 games and ending up on loan to Dundee United for 3 months. The 2005–2006 Barnsley campaign showed a turn of fortune for Colgan as he became the team's first choice keeper. His outstanding displays during the season earned him 20 clean sheets in total as well as the title of Barnsley's Player of the Year and helped the team reach the League One Play-off final at the Millennium Stadium in Cardiff on 27 May 2006 where despite a mistake letting Swansea City take the lead, he recovered to make a historic save from Alan Tate in the penalty shoot out which ensured Barnsley won their place back in the Championship. On 4 October 2007 he handed in a transfer request at Barnsley after losing his place to summer arrival Heinz Müller. Manager Simon Davey accepted the request.

=== Ipswich Town ===
He signed for Ipswich Town on 31 January 2008 as a free agent after settling his contract at Barnsley until the end of the season. He failed to make an appearance for Town, after fellow keeper Stephen Bywater was loaned in from Derby County who kept the goalkeeping shirt for the remainder of the season. Colgan was not offered a new contract at the end of the season and instead started the 2008–09 pre-season by training with Bradford City in the hope of earning a contract with the League Two club. He played his first game in more than 8 months on 16 July 2008 when Bradford City played Farsley Celtic in a pre-season friendly.

=== Sunderland ===
On 24 July 2008, Colgan returned to the Premier League and signed with Sunderland under the tenure of Roy Keane. The idea of Colgan's move was to provide cover for first choice keeper Craig Gordon, as well as competing for a place on the bench with fellow back-up keepers Darren Ward and Marton Fulop. Colgan was named as a substitute on several occasions, but failed to make an appearance for The Black Cats. He was eventually released on 28 May 2009 by Keane's replacement Ricky Sbragia along with six other first team players, notably Dwight Yorke, Rade Prica and David Connolly.

=== Grimsby Town ===
Colgan dropped three leagues down and re-signed for his former club Grimsby Town on 13 July 2009. He had previously spent a month on loan with Grimsby 15 years earlier whilst the club were a mid-table team in what is now the Championship, but Grimsby side had since dropped two divisions to League Two. Colgan signed for The Mariners after being recommended to manager Mike Newell by his former boss at Sunderland, Roy Keane. Colgan stepped into a squad with only teenagers as his cover, Leigh Overton and Ed Eley, neither of whom had any competitive outings in the first team.

Colgan's second stint at Blundell Park got off to a slow start as an early season injury put him out of action for 6 weeks. Mike Newell replaced Colgan with loan signings Tommy Forecast and Josh Lillis. Colgan made his return from injury on 30 September in a 3–2 defeat against Chesterfield.

Over the Easter weekend period, injuries to both Colgan and his young understudy Overton meant that Mark Oxley was signed on an emergency loan to deputise. Colgan returned to the side for the away victory against Hereford United on 10 April. In what was his final game for the club he was assaulted by one of his own fans when a fan ran onto the pitch to confront him moments after he had conceded the first goal in a 3–0 defeat at Burton Albion that condemned Grimsby to relegation. Colgan activated a clause in his contract which meant he was able to leave the club in the event of relegation. Manager Neil Woods commented that it was up to Colgan if he wished to leave the club. It was also stated that the signing of Rochdale's Kenny Arthur as Grimsby's new first choice keeper could sway Colgan's decision into leaving the club in favour of remaining as Town's back up goalkeeper for the upcoming season.

After failing to agree terms with another club during pre-season, Colgan returned to Grimsby for pre-season training. On 15 October 2010, Colgan moved on a month's loan to Football League One side Huddersfield Town, as cover for the injured Alex Smithies and the experienced Ian Bennett. He made no appearances and returned after one month. It was reported on 17 November 2010 it was stated by Grimsby chairman John Fenty that Colgan had no future at the club and on 7 January 2011 Colgan was released from his contract by mutual consent.

=== Huddersfield Town ===
On 21 January 2011, Colgan re-signed for Huddersfield Town on a contract running to the end of the season, mainly as back-up for Ian Bennett, while Alex Smithies is recovering from injury. He finished the 2010–11 season without playing a single league game for The Terriers, but made his debut in a 3–0 victory over Carlisle United in the Football League Trophy. During the 2011–12 season, Colgan remained the club's third choice goalkeeper, making two appearances all season, one in the FA Cup and another in the Football League Trophy. Despite not featuring as a regular in the league he was named as a substitute in the Football League One play-off final victory over Sheffield United at Wembley Stadium. On 29 May 2012 it was announced that Colgan would be appointed as full-time academy goalkeeping coach at Huddersfield for the 2012–13 campaign, but the club would retain his playing registration.

== International career ==
Colgan made his Ireland début in March 2002, against Denmark. He went on to make a total of ten appearances for his country, but was selected many more times for the national squad as a backup to the likes of Shay Given and Paddy Kenny.

== Coaching career ==
Colgan worked part-time as a goalkeeping coach with Barnsley's academy while playing for Huddersfield Town. At the end of the 2011–12 season, Colgan was appointed to a similar full-time role at Huddersfield Town.

In July 2014 Colgan made the step up to the club's first team goalkeeping coach, with Ian Bennett replacing him in his previous role with the academy. In June 2017, following Huddersfield's promotion to the Premier League, Colgan was sacked as the club's goalkeeping coach. He was reported to have consulted the Professional Football Coaches Association about possible legal action for wrongful dismissal. In July 2017 he was appointed to the coaching staff at Wigan Athletic.

On 16 October 2020, Colgan joined Chris Hughton's backroom team at Nottingham Forest as their goalkeeping coach.

In October 2022, Colgan returned to Stockport County as goalkeeping coach.

On 22nd June 2026, Stockport County announced that Colgan had left the club.

== Career statistics ==
=== Club ===
Appearances and goals by club, season and competition
Club	Season	League			FA Cup		League Cup		Other		Total	
Club	Season	Division	Apps	Goals	Apps	Goals	Apps	Goals	Apps	Goals	Apps	Goals
Chelsea	1992–93	Premier League	0	0	0	0	0	0	—		0	0
Chelsea	1993–94	Premier League	0	0	0	0	0	0	—		0	0
Chelsea	1994–95	Premier League	0	0	0	0	0	0	0	0	0	0
Chelsea	1995–96	Premier League	0	0	0	0	0	0	—		0	0
Chelsea	1996–97	Premier League	1	0	0	0	0	0	—		1	0
Chelsea	1997–98	Premier League	0	0	0	0	0	0	0	0	0	0
Chelsea	Total		1	0	0	0	0	0	0	0	1	0
Crewe Alexandra (loan)	1993–94	Third Division	0	0	0	0	0	0	0	0	0	0
Grimsby Town (loan)	1994–95	First Division	0	0	0	0	0	0	—		0	0
Millwall (loan)	1995–96	First Division	0	0	0	0	0	0	—		0	0
Brentford (loan)	1997–98	Second Division	5	0	0	0	0	0	0	0	5	0
Reading (loan)	1997–98	First Division	5	0	0	0	0	0	—		5	0
AFC Bournemouth	1998–99	Second Division	0	0	0	0	0	0	0	0	0	0
Hibernian	1999–00	Scottish Premier League	24	0	5	0	2	0	—		31	0
Hibernian	2000–01	Scottish Premier League	37	0	5	0	3	0	—		45	0
Hibernian	2001–02	Scottish Premier League	30	0	3	0	1	0	2 (Note: Appearances in UEFA Cup)	0	36	0
Hibernian	2002–03	Scottish Premier League	30	0	3	0	2	0	—		35	0
Hibernian	2003–04	Scottish Premier League	0	0	0	0	0	0	—		0	0
Hibernian	Total		121	0	16	0	8	0	2	0	147	0
Stockport County (loan)	2003–04	Second Division	15	0	0	0	2	0	0	0	17	0
Barnsley	2004–05	League One	13	0	0	0	1	0	1 (Note: Appearance(s) in Football League Trophy)	0	15	0
Barnsley	2005–06	League One	46	0	3	0	1	0	0	0	50	0
Barnsley	2006–07	Championship	44	0	0	0	2	0	—		46	0
Barnsley	2007–08	Championship	1	0	0	0	0	0	—		1	0
Barnsley	Total		104	0	3	0	4	0	1	0	112	0
Dundee United (loan)	2004–05	Scottish Premier League	1	0	0	0	1	0	—		2	0
Ipswich Town	2007–08	Championship	0	0	0	0	0	0	—		0	0
Sunderland	2008–09	Premier League	0	0	0	0	0	0	—		0	0
Grimsby Town	2009–10	League Two	35	0	1	0	1	0	2	0	39	0
Grimsby Town	2010–11	Conference National	0	0	0	0	—		0	0	0	0
Grimsby Town	Total		35	0	1	0	1	0	2	0	39	0
Huddersfield Town	2010–11	League One	0	0	0	0	0	0	1	0	1	0
Huddersfield Town	2011–12	League One	0	0	0	0	0	0	1	0	1	0
Huddersfield Town	2012–13	Championship	0	0	0	0	0	0	—		0	0
Huddersfield Town	Total		0	0	0	0	0	0	2	0	2	0
Career total			287	0	20	0	16	0	7	0	330	0

=== International ===
Appearances and goals by national team and year
National team	Year	Apps	Goals
Republic of Ireland
Republic of Ireland	2002	1	0
Republic of Ireland	2003	5	0
Republic of Ireland	2004	2	0
Republic of Ireland	2007	1	0
Total		9	0

== Honours ==
Hibernian

- Scottish Cup runner-up: 2000–01

Barnsley

- Football League One play-offs: 2006

Dundee United

- Scottish Cup runner-up: 2004–05

Huddersfield Town

- Football League One play-offs: 2012

Individual

- Barnsley Player of the Year: 2005–06
