= Gerry Collins (footballer) =

Scottish footballer (1955–2024)

Personal information
- Date of birth: 12 March 1955
- Place of birth: Glasgow, Scotland
- Date of death: 20 May 2024 (aged 69)
- Positions: Defender; midfielder

Senior career*
| Years | Team | Apps | (Gls) |
| 1979–1980 | Stranraer | 2 | (0) |
- Maryhill
- St Roch's
| 1981–1983 | Albion Rovers | 68 | (1) |
| 1983–1985 | Ayr United | 74 | (14) |
| 1985–1988 | Hamilton Academical | 94 | (5) |
| 1988–1991 | Partick Thistle | 90 | (1) |
| Total | | 328 | (21) |

Managerial career
- 1996: Falkirk
- 2003: Partick Thistle
- Glenafton Athletic
- * Club domestic league appearances and goals

Gerard Collins (12 March 1955 – 20 May 2024) was a Scottish football player and coach. A defender and midfielder, he played for Stranraer, Albion Rovers, Ayr United, Hamilton Academical, and Partick Thistle.

== Playing career ==
Collins played for Stranraer, Maryhill, St Roch's, Albion Rovers, Ayr United, Hamilton Academical and Partick Thistle.

At Hamilton, Collins began as a midfielder but converted to a defender after one season. He won the Division 1 title with Hamilton in 1986 and 1988, serving as club captain. He was a part-time player, also working as a taxi driver.

== Coaching career ==
Collins retired from playing to become assistant manager of Partick Thistle. He then became manager of Falkirk. He later managed Partick, and also Junior side Glenafton Athletic.

== Death ==
Collins died following a long illness on 20 May 2024, at the age of 69.
