= Hakim Sar-Temsoury =

French footballer (born 1981)

Personal information
- Date of birth: 6 March 1981 (age 45)
- Place of birth: Brive-la-Gaillarde, France
- Height: 1.80 m (5 ft 11 in)
- Positions: Midfielder; striker

Senior career*
Years	Team	Apps	(Gls)
1997–2000	Nantes (B team)		
2000–2001	Hibernian	1	(0)
2002–2004	ESA Brive		
2004–2009	CS Feytiat		
2009–	Limoges FC		
- * Club domestic league appearances and goals

Hakim Sar-Temsoury (born 6 March 1981) is a French football player.

Formerly a youth player of Nantes, in 2000 he signed for Hibernian, claiming that the presence of Franck Sauzee was a major factor in his decision to join the club. Alex McLeish, the manager, gave him one appearance in the SPL, a 2–0 win against Motherwell in September 2000. Sar-Temsoury also appeared as a substitute in two Scottish League Cup ties that season. He left the club at the end of the season and joined ESA Brive in the CFA 2.
