= Ulrik Laursen =

Danish footballer

Personal information
- Full name: Ulrik Rosenløv Laursen
- Date of birth: 28 February 1976 (age 50)
- Place of birth: Odense, Denmark
- Height: 1.92 m (6 ft 3 1/2 in)
- Position: Defender

Senior career*
Years	Team	Apps	(Gls)
1993–2000	OB	77	(1)
2000–2002	Hibernian	53	(3)
2002–2005	Celtic	40	(0)
2005–2008	OB	72	(6)
2008–2010	Copenhagen	49	(0)
Total		291	(10)

International career
1993–1995	Denmark U-19	12	(0)
1996–1997	Denmark U-21	16	(1)
2007–2008	Denmark	5	(1)
- * Club domestic league appearances and goals

Ulrik Rosenløv Laursen (born 28 February 1976) is a Danish former professional footballer who played as a defender. Laursen was predominantly used in the centre, but was also competent as a left back.

== Career ==
Laursen began his career at OB, where his talent was quickly discovered. He debuted for the Danish under-19 national team in 1993, aged 17, and won the 1993 Danish under-19 Player of the Year award. He transferred to Hibernian under manager Alex McLeish, on a free transfer in 2000. He was a fans favourite at Easter Road, scoring five goals in 82 appearances and helped the club reach the 2001 Scottish Cup Final against Celtic, which they lost 3–0.

He signed for Celtic in a £1.3 million deal in August 2002, and his first season saw him enjoy an extended run in the first team, thanks to injuries to other players. He made more than 30 appearances for "the Hoops" during the 2002–03 season, including the 2003 UEFA Cup Final against Porto. However, he failed to make any appearances the following season aside from one substitute appearance in the League Cup. He saw more playing time during the 2004–05 season, but he moved back to OB in the summer of 2005.

Laursen then transferred to Copenhagen in January 2008. After only six months in Copenhagen, Laursen was selected as new captain after Michael Gravgaard's departure to Nantes.

On 11 May 2010, Laursen confirmed that he will retire at the end of the 2009–10 season.

== Honours ==
OB

- Danish 1st Division: 1998–99
- Danish Cup: 2006–07

Celtic

- Scottish Premier League: 2003–04
- Scottish Cup: 2003–04, 2004–05
- UEFA Cup runners up: 2002–03

Copenhagen

- Danish Superliga: 2008–09 & 2009–10
- Danish Cup: 2008–09
