= Emilio Bottiglieri =

Canadian soccer player

Personal information
- Full name: Emilio Bottiglieri
- Date of birth: 13 April 1979 (age 47)
- Place of birth: Port Hardy, British Columbia, Canada
- Height: 5 ft 8 in (1.73 m)
- Position: Defender

Youth career
- –1997: Metro-Ford (Canada)

Senior career*
Years	Team	Apps	(Gls)
1997–2001	Hibernian	1	(0)
1998–1999	→ Albion Rovers (loan)	10	(1)
2000	→ Partick Thistle (loan)	2	(0)
2000–2001	→ East Fife (loan)	7	(0)
2001	East Fife	6	(0)
2001–2004	Greenock Morton	91	(5)
2004–2005	Sapperton Rovers		
2006–	Metro-Ford Wolves		
- * Club domestic league appearances and goals as of 22:02, 18 March 2009 (UTC)

Emilio "Mel" Bottiglieri (born 13 April 1979 in Port Hardy) is a Canadian soccer player. He played for seven years in the Scottish Football League as a left sided defender. He is of Italian ancestry.

== Honours ==
=== Greenock Morton ===
- Scottish Football League Third Division: 1

2002–03
