= Brian Quinn (economist) =

Brian Quinn, CBE (born 1936 in Glasgow) is a Scottish economist and former football club chairman. He is an honorary professor of economics at Glasgow University. He is best known for his spell as the chairman of Celtic Plc board.

== Early life ==
Quinn was educated at Glasgow University, where he obtained an MA (Hons) degree. He also obtained an MA degree in economics from the University of Manchester and a PhD degree in economics from Cornell University.

== Professional career ==
Between 1964 and 1970 Quinn worked for the International Monetary Fund (IMF), first as an economist at the African Department, then as IMF Representative for West Africa. He then joined the Bank of England as an economist, eventually rising to Deputy Governor in 1995. In 1996, he joined Celtic as a non-executive director, and was made chairman in 2000. He served the club in this position for seven years, during which time the club won five SPL titles, four Scottish Cups and three Scottish League Cups. He announced he was to resign the chair of Celtic on 17 November 2007 and was succeeded by John Reid.

Quinn also serves as a non-executive director for the Qatar financial services authority and runs a financial consulting business.

He was appointed CBE in the 1996 Birthday Honours.
