= Johan Mjällby =

Swedish footballer and manager

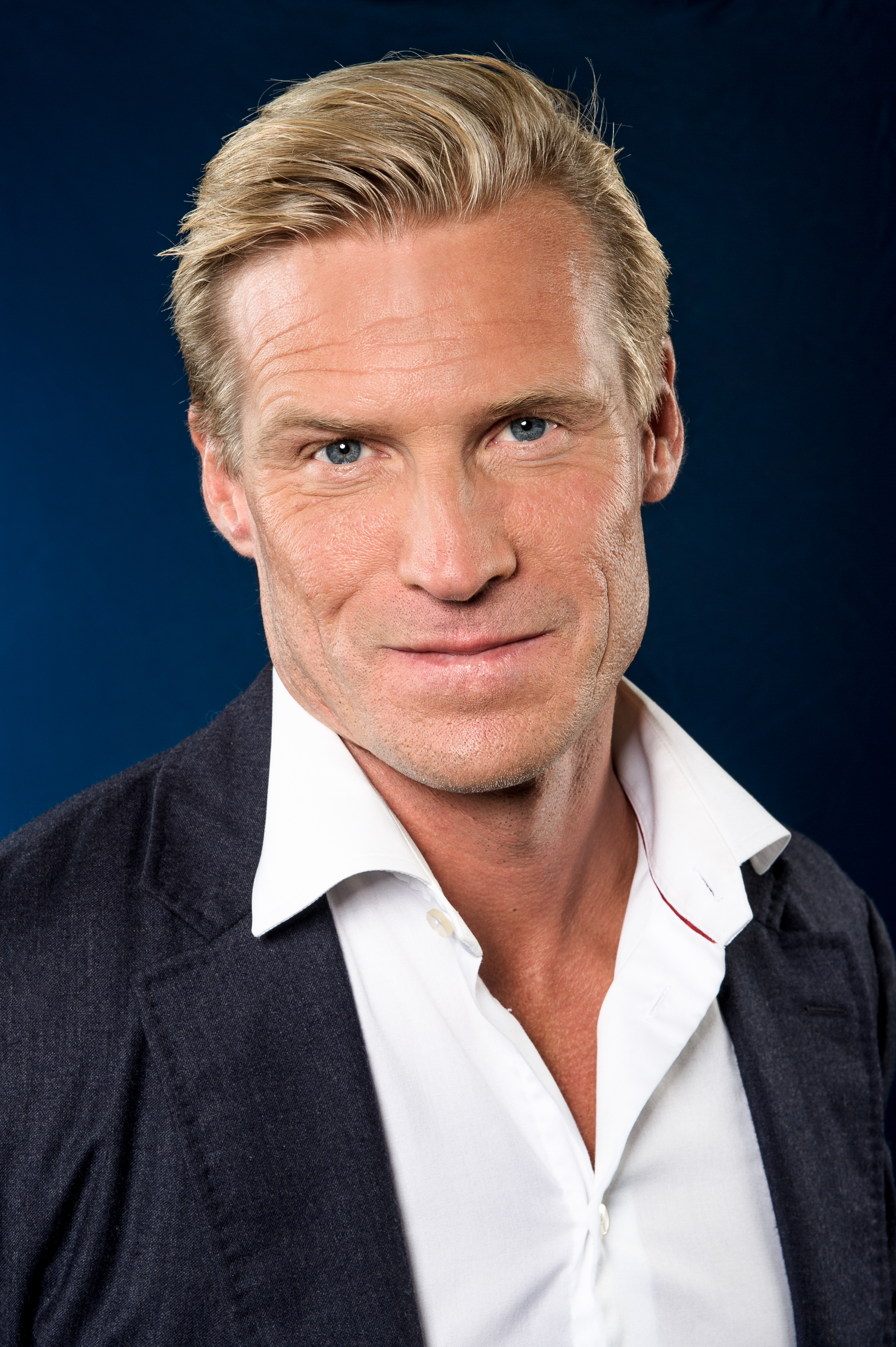
- Mjällby in 2014

Personal information
- Full name: Karl Johan Siward Mjällby
- Date of birth: 9 February 1971 (age 55)
- Place of birth: Järfälla, Sweden
- Height: 6 ft 1 in (1.85 m)
- Position: Centre-back

Youth career
- 1976–1984: IK Bele
- 1984–1989: AIK

Senior career*
Years	Team	Apps	(Gls)
1989–1998	AIK	135	(8)
1998–2004	Celtic	144	(13)
2004–2005	Levante	3	(0)
2006	AIK	1	(0)
Total		292	(21)

International career
1990–1991	Sweden U21	7	(0)
1997–2004	Sweden	49	(4)

Managerial career
- 2010–2014: Celtic (assistant)
- 2014–2015: Bolton (assistant)
- 2016–2017: Västerås SK
- 2018: Gefle IF
- 2019–2020: FC Stockholm Internazionale
- * Club domestic league appearances and goals

Karl Johan Siward Mjällby (Swedish pronunciation: [ˈjûːan ˈmjɛ̌lːbʏ]; born 9 February 1971) is a Swedish football manager and former professional player who played as a centre-back. He represented AIK, Celtic, and Levante during a career that spanned between 1989 and 2006. A full international between 1997 and 2004, he won 49 caps and scored 4 goals for the Sweden national team. Mjällby was the team captain during the 2002 FIFA World Cup, and also took part in UEFA Euro 2000 and 2004. He has been assistant manager of Bolton Wanderers and Celtic, working alongside former Celtic team-mate and manager Neil Lennon.

== Playing career ==
=== Early career ===
Early on in Mjällby's sporting career he played both football and tennis and had the choice to turn professional in either. He made the decision to prioritise football and was signed by AIK in 1984 from IK Bele.

=== AIK ===
Mjällby spent the next fourteen years in AIK and established himself in the side with solid performances as a no-nonsense tackling midfield player. His performances at club level were noticed and he soon broke through to the Sweden national team. Although he was a squad member in 1992 when AIK won the league, he refused to accept the gold medal, stating that he felt he had not contributed enough. Therefore, it was a great day when lifelong AIK supporter Mjällby got his silverware in 1998 when he guided the club to a new league victory.

=== Celtic ===
His solid performances for club and country caught the eye of Jozef Venglos, coach at Celtic. In November 1998 Mjällby signed for Celtic for a fee of around £1,200,000 and was given 35 as his squad number, which he retained throughout his time at Celtic. Mjällby arrived at the club one year after compatriot and international teammate Henrik Larsson and they departed the club the same year in 2004. He made his debut for the Scottish side in the famous 5–1 victory over archrivals Rangers in the role of central defence. The rest of season 1998–99 saw Mjällby play increasingly in the role of central defence, a role in which he grew to prominence.

The 1999–2000 season saw Venglos move into the role of a scout with John Barnes coming in as head coach and Kenny Dalglish as director of football. Mjällby again took up his midfield role in Barnes' ill-fated 4–2–2–2 formation. He returned to his by now accustomed defensive role under Dalglish following the departure of Barnes in January 2000. It was under Dalglish that Mjällby won his first honour at Celtic in the League Cup win over Aberdeen.

Season 2000–01 saw Martin O'Neill replace interim manager Kenny Dalglish. Mjällby found himself a mainstay on the left hand side of O'Neill's three-man defence alongside Joos Valgaeren, Tom Boyd and/or Bobo Baldé. He was to pick up a further three medals as Celtic won the Domestic Treble of the Scottish Premier League, League Cup, and Scottish Cup.

It was in 2001–02 that Mjällby experienced his first taste of Champions League football in matches against FC Porto, Juventus and Rosenborg. Another Scottish Premier League title was added to his growing medal haul.

2002–03 saw Celtic, with Mjällby as prominent figure reach the final of the UEFA Cup. They lost out to FC Porto 3–2 aet. Celtic also went on to lose the Scottish Premier League and League Cup to Rangers.

Season 2003–04 was Mjällby's last at Celtic Park. After struggling with injury throughout most of the season, he decided to turn down Celtic's offer of a one-year deal.

Throughout his six years at Celtic Park he picked up 3 Scottish Premier League Winner's medals, 2 League Cup Winner's medals, 2 Scottish Cup Winner's medals, 2 Scottish Cup Runners Up medals, 1 League Cup Runners Up medal and 1 UEFA Cup Runners Up medal as well as featuring in the Champions League Competition of seasons, 2001–02 and 2002–03. During his time at Celtic, Mjällby captained the team on several occasions. Mjällby enjoyed a good relationship with the Celtic support in his time at the club and was often referred to as "Dolph" or "Big Dolph" given his perceived resemblance to his countryman, actor Dolph Lundgren.

=== Levante ===
Mjällby was signed by newly promoted Spanish La Liga side Levante, signing a two-year contract. However, he did not enjoy the same level of success as he had in Scotland and was forced to retire, having failed to recover from two operations on his knee.

=== Return to AIK and retirement ===
Following his retirement Mjällby returned home to Sweden. After almost a year out of the game he made comeback and signed once again for his boyhood favourites AIK.

However, on 16 May 2006 he was forced to retire from professional football due to his injury.

== International career ==
=== Early career ===
Mjällby made seven appearances for the Sweden U21 team before making his senior debut for Sweden on 12 March 1997 in a friendly game against Israel. He made his competitive debut for Sweden in a UEFA Euro 2000 qualifier against England, in which he also scored his first international goal.

=== UEFA Euro 2000 ===
At UEFA Euro 2000, Mjällby scored for Sweden in the opening match against Belgium, taking the ball after an error by Belgian goalkeeper Filip De Wilde. Although reducing Belgium's 2–0 lead from Bart Goor and Emile Mpenza to 2–1, Sweden failed to score an equalising goal and lost the game.

=== 2002 FIFA World Cup ===
Mjällby captained Sweden at the 2002 FIFA World Cup after fellow defender Patrik Andersson had to withdraw because of injury. Mjällby formed a solid partnership with Andreas Jakobsson when Sweden won Group F ahead of England, Argentina, and Nigeria, before being eliminated by Senegal in the second round.

=== UEFA Euro 2004 and retirement ===
Two years later Mjällby was in the squad for UEFA Euro 2004 but did not make any appearances. He made his last international appearance on 9 October 2004 in a 2006 FIFA World Cup qualifier against Hungary. In total Mjällby won a total of 49 caps, scoring 4 goals.

== Coaching career ==
On 25 March 2010, it was announced that Mjällby would assume the role of assistant manager at Celtic Football Club, alongside temporary boss, and former team-mate, Neil Lennon. The appointment of Lennon and Mjällby was made after the sacking of Tony Mowbray as Celtic manager after a poor 2009–10 season for the club, culminating in a 4–0 defeat against St Mirren.

When asked about the appointment by reporters, Mjällby stated, "Neil is like myself. He has a will-to-win and that is what we are both looking to instill in the current Celtic team. We want our players to go out on the park, and on the training pitch, and to wear that Celtic jersey with pride." On 1 July 2010, Mjällby was confirmed as Neil Lennon's assistant manager at Celtic.

On 22 April 2014, it was announced that Mjällby would leave Celtic at the end of the season to look for new challenges in football.

On 12 October 2014, he was appointed as the Assistant Manager at Bolton Wanderers linking up again with his former Celtic colleagues Neil Lennon and Garry Parker. In September 2015, he stepped down from his role at Bolton citing personal reasons and was replaced by Steve Walford.

In February 2016, Mjällby became head coach of Swedish Division 1 team Västerås SK.

== Career statistics ==
=== Club ===
Appearances and goals by club, season and competition
Club	Season	League			National cup		League cup		Europe		Other		Total	
Club	Season	Division	Apps	Goals	Apps	Goals	Apps	Goals	Apps	Goals	Apps	Goals	Apps	Goals
AIK	1989	Allsvenskan	1	0	–		–		–		–		1	0
AIK	1990	Allsvenskan	14	0	2	0	–		–		–		16	0
AIK	1991	Allsvenskan	16	0	5	0	–		–		10 (Note: Appearances in Mästerskapsserien)	0	31	0
AIK	1992	Allsvenskan	0	0	–		–		–		–		–	
AIK	1993	Allsvenskan	7	0	2	0	–		2	0	–		11	0
AIK	1994	Allsvenskan	23	0	1	0	–		6	0	–		30	0
AIK	1995	Allsvenskan	19	0	4	0	–		–		–		23	0
AIK	1996	Allsvenskan	23	5	4	0	–		3	0	–		30	5
AIK	1997	Allsvenskan	7	1	3	1	–		4	0	–		14	2
AIK	1998	Allsvenskan	24	2	5	1	–		–		–		29	3
AIK	Total		134	8	26	2	–		15	0	10	0	185	10
Celtic	1998–99	Scottish Premier League	17	1					–		–		17	1
Celtic	1999–2000	Scottish Premier League	29	2					2	1	–		31	3
Celtic	2000–01	Scottish Premier League	35	4					6	0	–		41	4
Celtic	2001–02	Scottish Premier League	35	3					10	0	–		45	3
Celtic	2002–03	Scottish Premier League	14	3					7	0	–		21	3
Celtic	2003–04	Scottish Premier League	13	0					3	0	–		16	0
Celtic	Total		143	13					28	1	–		171	14
Levante	2004–05	La Liga	3	0	–		–		–		–		3	0
AIK	2006	Allsvenskan	1	0	–		–		–		–		1	0
Career total			281	21	26	2			43	1	10	0	360	24

=== International ===
Appearances and goals by national team and year
National team	Year	Apps	Goals
Sweden	1997	1	0
Sweden	1998	7	1
Sweden	1999	7	1
Sweden	2000	11	2
Sweden	2001	5	0
Sweden	2002	10	0
Sweden	2003	3	0
Sweden	2004	5	0
Total		49	4

Scores and results list Sweden's goal tally first, score column indicates score after each Mjällby goal.

List of international goals scored by Johan Mjällby
No.	Date	Venue	Opponent	Score	Result	Competition
1	5 September 1998	Råsunda Stadium, Solna, Sweden	England	2–1	2–1	UEFA Euro 2000 qualifier
2	27 March 1999	Ullevi, Gothenburg, Sweden	Luxembourg	1–0	2–0	UEFA Euro 2000 qualifier
3	10 June 2000	King Baudouin Stadium, Brussels, Belgium	Belgium	1–2	1–2	UEFA Euro 2000
4	16 August 2000	Laugardalsvöllur, Reykjavik, Iceland	Iceland	1–0	1–2	2000–01 Nordic Football Championship

== Honours ==
AIK

- Allsvenskan: 1992, 1998
- Svenska Cupen: 1995–96, 1996–97

Celtic

- Scottish Premier League: 2000–01, 2001–02, 2003–04
- Scottish League Cup: 1999–2000, 2000–01
- Scottish Cup: 2000–01, 2003–04
- UEFA Cup runner-up: 2002–03

Individual

- Stor Grabb: 1999
- Swedish Defender of the Year: 2002
