= Didier Agathe =

French footballer (born 1975)

Personal information
- Full name: Didier Fernand Agathe
- Date of birth: 16 August 1975 (age 51)
- Place of birth: Saint-Pierre, Réunion
- Height: 1.81 m (5 ft 11 in)
- Position: Wingback

Senior career*
Years	Team	Apps	(Gls)
1992–1999	Montpellier	41	(3)
1996–1997	→ Alès (loan)	29	(4)
1999–2000	Raith Rovers	30	(7)
2000	Hibernian	5	(4)
2000–2006	Celtic	122	(9)
2006–2007	Aston Villa	5	(0)
2007–2010	JS Saint-Pierroise		

Managerial career
- 2020: Durham City
- 2021–: Chester-le-Street United
- * Club domestic league appearances and goals

Didier Fernand Agathe (born 16 August 1975) is a French football manager and former professional footballer who most recently managed Chester-le-Street United. He is most known for his playing time at Celtic.

Agathe began his career at French side Montpellier HSC before moving to Scotland to join Raith Rovers and then Hibernian. His performances gained him a high-profile transfer to Celtic where he enjoyed the most successful spell of his career winning three championships and was part of the squad that reached the 2003 UEFA Cup Final. He was also the manager of Northern League Division Two side Durham City in 2020.

== Playing career ==
=== Early career ===
Agathe was spotted in his homeland of La Réunion began by a scout from French Ligue 1 club Montpellier HSC in 1992. Although several other clubs expressed an interest in signing Agathe, he chose to join Montpellier given their location in the south of France. His time in France was marred by illness and injury; his appendix burst shortly after arriving, and afterwards he suffered a string of injuries before medical staff found he had no cartilage in his right knee. During his time in France, he was loaned out for a spell to Olympique Alès where he played 29 games and scored four goals.

=== Raith Rovers ===
At the end of his contract with Montpellier, Agathe travelled to England in 1999 to try to find a club to continue his professional career. He had a successful trial with Stockport County, but the move fell through when he failed the medical. He was then introduced to agent Willie McKay who persuaded Agathe to try finding a club in Scotland. McKay took him to Kirkcaldy, where local club Raith Rovers were looking for a striker having lost their first four games of the season. Although he had never played a competitive game as a forward, Agathe told Raith Rovers manager John McVeigh that he had, and he scored twice in a bounce game against the first team. He then played days later against Airdrie as a trialist, and scored a hat-trick. He went on to play over 30 games for Raith that season, scoring seven times.

=== Hibernian ===
When his deal at Raith Rovers expired in the summer of 2000, the best offer available at the time to Agathe was a short-term deal at Scottish Premier League club Hibernian. He missed an open goal in his debut against Hearts. He redeemed himself in his next two matches, scoring braces against Dundee United and Dundee in consecutive weeks, the latter game including a solo goal where he ran from the half-way line, evaded the challenges of four Dundee players before shooting past goalkeeper Rab Douglas.

=== Celtic ===
His form at Hibs caught the eye of Celtic manager Martin O'Neill, and on the expiration of his short-term contract Celtic made a move to sign him. Agathe's knee condition was noted during his medical, but O'Neill was not concerned and completed the signing of Agathe for just £27,000.

Agathe made his debut for Celtic on 14 October 2000 in a home league game against St Mirren. Fielded by O'Neill wide on the right, Agathe turned in an outstanding performance in a 2–0 win for Celtic, with his pace and skill running the St Mirren defence ragged. O'Neill enthused about Agathe's debut, "He was absolutely brilliant, fantastic even. I did not think he would last more than 60 minutes but he has so much strength and pace". Agathe kept his place in the team, playing at right wingback, and scored his first goal for Celtic in December 2000 against Dundee with a header in the last minute to give his team a 2–1 win. He went to help Celtic win a domestic treble of League, Scottish Cup and Scottish League Cup that season. Agathe provided the assist for Jackie McNamara's opening goal in their 3–0 win over Hibs in the Scottish Cup Final. However, he was cup-tied for their victorious 2000–01 Scottish League Cup campaign.

O'Neill continued to use Agathe as either a right back or right wingback and was a regular in his side. The club won three championships and reached the 2003 UEFA Cup Final. Following good performances in European competition, he was once linked with moves to Juventus and Valencia during the 2001–02 season.. In February 2004, the Scotland manager Berti Vogts expressed interest in selecting Agathe.

Agathe hardly featured during the 2005–06 season under new manager Gordon Strachan and was linked with a loan move to Leeds United, then he had a trial at Middlesbrough. In February 2006, he was released from his contract.

=== Aston Villa ===
Agathe underwent a trial at Premier League side Blackburn Rovers prior to the 2006–07 season, but after manager Mark Hughes let him leave as it could not offer him guarantees regarding playing time, he finished his trial period early. He began training with Aston Villa, managed by his former Celtic boss Martin O'Neill He agreed to a short-term contract and made his Villa début at home to Tottenham Hotspur in a 1–1 draw. On 11 January 2007, however, Agathe parted company with Aston Villa, after they chose not to extend his short-term contract. Agathe made a total of six substitute appearances in his short time at Villa Park, but did not start a single game.

=== JS Saint-Pierroise ===
He then signed for JS Saint-Pierroise, a club in his homeland of Réunion.

Agathe has set up an academy for young footballers on Réunion. Three players – Heeking Jerome, Mathis Yohan and Jeremy Judith – signed for Stirling Albion in August 2010.

On 8 September 2013, Agathe played for the "Celtic XI" during the Stiliyan Petrov charity match put on by Celtic FC.

== Managerial career ==
In April 2020, Agathe was appointed manager of English Northern Football League Division Two team Durham City. At the time the season was annulled due to the coronavirus pandemic, the club were seven point adrift at the bottom of the division, and during the summer Agathe would orchestrate a squad overhaul, including the arrival of players from Dutch footballing academies. Agathe left the club in October, having secured one point from the opening nine games of the season, though club owner Olivier Bernard said the results were not the reason he had left.

== Film ==
Agathe, who played over 100 league games for Celtic, portrayed a Rangers striker in the Robert Duvall movie, A Shot at Glory.

== Career statistics ==
Club	Season	League		Cup		League Cup		Other		Total	
Club	Season	Apps	Goals	Apps	Goals	Apps	Goals	Apps	Goals	Apps	Goals
Raith Rovers	1999–2000	30	7	1	0	0	0	1	0	32	7
Hibernian	2000–01	5	4	0	0	1	0	-	-	6	4
Celtic	2000–01	27	3	6	0	5	0	2	0	36	3
Celtic	2001–02	20	1	3	0	1	0	8	1	32	2
Celtic	2002–03	27	0	0	0	2	0	11	0	40	0
Celtic	2003–04	28	5	5	0	0	0	14	1	47	7
Celtic	2004–05	16	0	2	0	1	0	5	0	24	0
Celtic	2005–06	4	0	0	0	0	0	0	0	4	0
Celtic	Total	122	9	16	0	5	0	40	2	183	11
Aston Villa	2006–07	5	0	0	0	1	0	-	-	6	0
Career total		162	20	17	0	7	0	41	2	227	22

== Honours ==
Celtic

- Scottish Premier League: 2000–01, 2001–02, 2003–04
- Scottish Cup: 2000–01, 2003–04, 2004–05
- Scottish League Cup: 2000–01
- UEFA Cup runner-up: 2002–03
