= 2003–04 Scottish Premier League =

98th season of top-tier football league in Scotland

Scottish Premier League
- Season: 2003–04
- Dates: 8 August 2003 – 15 May 2004
- Champions: Celtic; 3rd Premier League title 39th Scottish title
- Relegated: Partick Thistle
- Champions League: Celtic; Rangers
- UEFA Cup: Heart of Midlothian; Dunfermline
- Intertoto Cup: Hibernian
- Top goalscorer: Henrik Larsson (30)
- Biggest home win: Celtic 6–0 Hibernian (27 December)
- Biggest away win: Kilmarnock 0–5 Celtic (1 November)
- Highest attendance: 59,739 – Celtic v Dunfermline (2 May)
- Lowest attendance: 2,677 – Livingston v Kilmarnock (7 April)

The 2003–04 Scottish Premier League was won by Celtic.

As league champions, Celtic qualified for the UEFA Champions League group stage, with runners-up Rangers also qualifying to the third qualifying round. Third-placed Hearts qualified for the UEFA Cup, as did Dunfermline Athletic, who took the Scottish Cup place despite losing the final to Celtic.

During the season, Celtic set a Scottish record of 25 successive wins.

Partick Thistle were relegated, and First Division winners Inverness Caledonian Thistle were promoted.

Celtic's Henrik Larsson was the top scorer with 30 goals.

== Teams ==
=== Promotion and relegation from 2002–03 ===
Motherwell finished bottom of the 2002–03 Scottish Premier League but were spared relegation, as 2002–03 Scottish First Division champions Falkirk were denied promotion due to their lack of an appropriate stadium for the Scottish Premier League.

=== Stadia and locations ===
Aberdeen	Celtic	Dundee	Dundee United
Pittodrie Stadium	Celtic Park	Dens Park	Tannadice Park
Capacity: 20,866	Capacity: 60,411	Capacity: 11,506	Capacity: 14,223
Dunfermline Athletic	Location of teams in 2003–04 Scottish Premier League		Heart of Midlothian
East End Park	Location of teams in 2003–04 Scottish Premier League		Tynecastle Park
Capacity: 12,509	Location of teams in 2003–04 Scottish Premier League		Capacity: 17,420
Hibernian	Location of teams in 2003–04 Scottish Premier League		Kilmarnock
Easter Road	Location of teams in 2003–04 Scottish Premier League		Rugby Park
Capacity: 16,531	Location of teams in 2003–04 Scottish Premier League		Capacity: 17,889
Livingston	Motherwell	Partick Thistle	Rangers
Almondvale Stadium	Fir Park	Firhill Stadium	Ibrox Stadium
Capacity: 10,016	Capacity: 13,677	Capacity: 13,300	Capacity: 50,817

=== Personnel ===
Team	Manager
Aberdeen	(Scotland) Steve Paterson
Celtic	(Northern Ireland) Martin O'Neill
Dundee	(Scotland) Jim Duffy
Dundee United	(Scotland) Ian McCall
Dunfermline Athletic	(Scotland) Jimmy Calderwood
Heart of Midlothian	(Scotland) Craig Levein
Hibernian	(England) Tony Mowbray
Kilmarnock	(Scotland) Jim Jefferies
Livingston	(Scotland) David Hay
Motherwell	(England) Terry Butcher
Partick Thistle	(Scotland) Gerry Britton (Scotland) Derek Whyte (co-managers)
Rangers	(Scotland) Alex McLeish

==== Managerial changes ====
Team	Outgoing manager	Date of vacancy	Manner of departure	Position in table	Incoming manager	Date of appointment
Partick Thistle	(Scotland) John Lambie	24 May 2003	Retired	Pre-season	(Scotland) Gerry Collins	25 May 2003
Livingston	(Scotland) Jim Leishman	4 June 2003	Resigned	Pre-season	(Brazil) Márcio Máximo	4 June 2003
Livingston	(Brazil) Márcio Máximo	14 October 2003	Resigned	8th	(Scotland) David Hay	15 October 2003
Partick Thistle	(Scotland) Gerry Collins	30 November 2003	Sacked	12th	(Scotland) Gerry Britton (Scotland) Derek Whyte (co-managers)	30 November 2003 (interim); 23 December 2003 (permanent)
Hibernian	(Scotland) Bobby Williamson	20 April 2004	Signed by Plymouth Argyle	7th	(England) Tony Mowbray	24 May 2004

== League table ==
Pos	Team	Pld	W	D	L	GF	GA	GD	Pts	Qualification or relegation (Note: Teams played each other three times (33 matches), before the league split into two groups (the top six and the bottom six) for the last five matches.)
1	Celtic (C)	38	31	5	2	105	25	+80	98	Qualification for the Champions League group stage
2	Rangers	38	25	6	7	76	33	+43	81	Qualification for the Champions League third qualifying round
3	Heart of Midlothian	38	19	11	8	56	40	+16	68	Qualification for the UEFA Cup first round (Note: As Celtic, the 2003–04 Scottish Cup winners, qualified for the UEFA Champions League via their league position, the place in the UEFA Cup was passed onto Dunfermline Athletic, the cup runners-up.)
4	Dunfermline Athletic	38	14	11	13	45	52	−7	53	Qualification for the UEFA Cup first round
5	Dundee United	38	13	10	15	47	60	−13	49	
6	Motherwell	38	12	10	16	42	49	−7	46	
7	Dundee	38	12	10	16	48	57	−9	46	
8	Hibernian	38	11	11	16	41	60	−19	44	Qualification for the UEFA Intertoto Cup second round (Note: Hibernian qualified for the 2004 UEFA Intertoto Cup as the highest placed team to apply to participate in the competition.)
9	Livingston	38	10	13	15	48	57	−9	43	
10	Kilmarnock	38	12	6	20	51	74	−23	42	
11	Aberdeen	38	9	7	22	39	63	−24	34	
12	Partick Thistle (R)	38	6	8	24	39	67	−28	26	Relegation to the Scottish First Division

Source: Scottish Professional Football League
Rules for classification: 1) Points; 2) Goal difference; 3) Goals scored
(C) Champions; (R) Relegated

== Results ==
=== Matches 1–22 ===
During matches 1–22 each team played every other team twice (home and away).

Home \ Away	ABE	CEL	DND	DUN	DNF	HOM	HIB	KIL	LIV	MOT	PAR	RAN
Aberdeen		1–3	2–2	0–1	1–2	0–1	3–1	3–1	0–3	0–3	2–1	2–3
Celtic	4–0		3–2	5–0	5–0	5–0	6–0	5–1	5–1	3–0	3–1	3–0
Dundee	2–0	0–1		2–1	0–2	1–2	1–1	1–2	2–1	0–1	1–0	0–2
Dundee United	3–2	1–5	1–1		1–0	2–1	1–2	1–1	2–0	0–2	0–0	1–3
Dunfermline Athletic	2–2	0–0	2–0	2–0		2–1	0–0	2–3	2–2	1–0	2–1	2–0
Heart of Midlothian	2–0	0–1	2–2	3–0	1–0		2–0	2–1	3–1	0–0	2–0	0–4
Hibernian	1–1	1–2	1–1	2–2	1–2	1–0		3–1	0–2	0–2	3–2	0–1
Kilmarnock	1–3	0–5	1–1	0–2	1–1	0–2	0–2		0–3	2–0	2–1	2–3
Livingston	1–1	0–2	1–1	0–0	0–0	2–3	1–0	1–2		1–0	2–0	0–0
Motherwell	1–0	0–2	0–3	3–1	2–2	1–1	0–1	2–1	1–1		2–2	1–1
Partick Thistle	0–3	1–2	1–2	0–2	4–1	1–4	0–1	2–4	1–1	1–0		0–1
Rangers	3–0	0–1	3–1	2–1	4–0	2–1	5–2	4–0	1–0	1–0	3–1	

Legend: Blue = home team win; Yellow = draw; Red = away team win.

=== Matches 23–33 ===
During matches 23–33 each team played every other team once (either at home or away).

Home \ Away	ABE	CEL	DND	DUN	DNF	HOM	HIB	KIL	LIV	MOT	PAR	RAN
Aberdeen				3–0	2–0				1–2	0–2	0–0	1–1
Celtic	1–2			2–1		2–2			5–1	1–1		
Dundee	1–1	1–2			0–1		2–2		1–0		2–1	
Dundee United			2–2				0–0	4–1		1–0		2–0
Dunfermline Athletic		1–4		1–1		0–0	1–1	2–1			1–0	
Heart of Midlothian	1–0		3–1	3–1					1–1			1–1
Hibernian	0–1	0–4				1–1		3–0	3–1	3–3		
Kilmarnock	3–1	0–1	4–2			1–1					2–1	
Livingston				2–3	0–0			1–1		3–1		1–1
Motherwell			5–3		1–0	1–1		1–0			3–0	0–1
Partick Thistle		1–4		1–1		1–0	1–1		5–2			
Rangers		1–2	4–0		4–1		3–0	2–0			2–0	

Legend: Blue = home team win; Yellow = draw; Red = away team win.

=== Matches 34–38 ===
During matches 34–38 each team played every other team in their half of the table once.

==== Top six ====
Home \ Away	CEL	DUN	DNF	HOM	MOT	RAN
Celtic		2–1	1–2			1–0
Dundee United			3–2	0–2		3–3
Dunfermline Athletic					3–0	2–3
Heart of Midlothian	1–1		2–1		3–2	
Motherwell	1–1	0–1				
Rangers				0–1	4–0	

Legend: Blue = home team win; Yellow = draw; Red = away team win.

==== Bottom six ====
Home \ Away	ABE	DND	HIB	KIL	LIV	PAR
Aberdeen		1–2	0–1			
Dundee				2–0	2–0	
Hibernian		1–0				1–2
Kilmarnock	4–0		2–0		4–2	
Livingston	2–0		4–1			2–2
Partick Thistle	2–0	0–1		2–2		

Legend: Blue = home team win; Yellow = draw; Red = away team win.

== Top scorers ==
Player	Club	Goals
(Sweden) Henrik Larsson	Celtic	30
(England) Chris Sutton	Celtic	19
(Spain) Nacho Novo	Dundee	19
(Scotland) James Grady	Partick Thistle	15
(Scotland) Kris Boyd	Kilmarnock	15
(Scotland) Derek Riordan	Hibernian	15
(Scotland) Stevie Crawford	Dunfermline Athletic	13
(Suriname) Mark de Vries	Hearts	13
(Scotland) Derek Lilley	Livingston	12
(Georgia (country)) Shota Arveladze	Rangers	12
(Scotland) David Clarkson	Motherwell	11
(England) Alan Thompson	Celtic	11

Source: SPL official website

== Attendances ==
The average attendances for SPL clubs during the 2003/04 season are shown below:

Team	Average
Celtic	57,657
Rangers	48,992
Hearts	11,947
Aberdeen	10,389
Hibernian	9,137
Dundee United	7,785
Dundee	7,089
Kilmarnock	6,966
Dunfermline Athletic	6,235
Motherwell	6,225
Livingston	5,116
Partick Thistle	4,710

Source: SPL official website

== Awards ==
=== Monthly awards ===
Month	Manager	Player	Young Player
August	(Scotland) Alex McLeish (Rangers)	(England) Michael Ball (Rangers)	(Spain) Mikel Arteta (Rangers)
September	(Scotland) Alex McLeish (Rangers)	(Georgia (country)) Shota Arveladze (Rangers)	(Georgia (country)) Zurab Khizanishvili (Rangers)
October	(Northern Ireland) Martin O'Neill (Celtic)	(Scotland) Roddy McKenzie (Livingston)	(Republic of Ireland) Liam Miller (Celtic)
November	(Northern Ireland) Martin O'Neill (Celtic)	(England) Chris Sutton (Celtic)	(Scotland) Stephen Hughes (Rangers)
December	(Scotland) Steve Paterson (Aberdeen)	(Scotland) Craig Brewster (Dunfermline Athletic)	(Scotland) Craig Gordon (Hearts)
January	(Scotland) Jim Duffy (Dundee)	(Bulgaria) Stilian Petrov (Celtic)	(Scotland) David Clarkson (Motherwell)
February	(England) Terry Butcher (Motherwell)	(Scotland) Steven Pressley (Hearts)	(Scotland) Alexander Diamond (Aberdeen)
March	(Scotland) Ian McCall (Dundee United)	(Northern Ireland) Neil Lennon (Celtic)	(Scotland) David Marshall (Celtic)
April	(Scotland) Jimmy Calderwood (Dunfermline Athletic)	(Scotland) Barry Nicholson (Dunfermline Athletic)	(Scotland) Derek Riordan (Hibernian)

=== Annual awards ===
- Player awards

Award	Winner	Club
PFA Players' Player of the Year	(England) Chris Sutton	Celtic
PFA Young Player of the Year	(Scotland) Stephen Pearson	Celtic
SFWA Footballer of the Year	(Scotland) Jackie McNamara	Celtic
SFWA Young Player of the Year	(Scotland) Craig Gordon	Heart of Midlothian

- Manager awards

Award	Winner	Club
SFWA Manager of the Year	(Northern Ireland) Martin O'Neill	Celtic

== See also ==
- 2003–04 Celtic F.C. season
- 2003–04 Rangers F.C. season
- 2003–04 Dundee United F.C. season
