= John O'Neil (footballer) =

Scottish footballer

Personal information
- Full name: John Thomas O'Neil
- Date of birth: 7 June 1971 (age 55)
- Place of birth: Bellshill, Scotland
- Position: Midfielder

Senior career*
Years	Team	Apps	(Gls)
1988–1994	Dundee United	78	(4)
1994–2000	St Johnstone	186	(22)
2000–2003	Hibernian	86	(10)
2003–2006	Falkirk	70	(5)
2006–2007	Gretna	22	(2)
2007–2009	Cowdenbeath	31	(0)
2009	East Stirlingshire	2	(0)
Total		475	(43)

International career
1991	Scotland under-21	1	(0)
2001	Scotland	1	(0)
- * Club domestic league appearances and goals

John Thomas O'Neil (born 7 June 1971 in Bellshill, North Lanarkshire) is a Scottish former professional association footballer. He represented Scotland once, and played for Dundee United, St Johnstone, Hibernian and Falkirk in the top division.

== Career ==
O'Neil, a right-sided midfielder, began his career at Dundee United, where he progressed through the youth ranks. O'Neil scored for United after coming on as a substitute in their 1991 Scottish Cup final defeat against Motherwell, with his header reducing Motherwell's lead to 3–2. At the start of the 1994–95 season, he was signed by ex-United colleague Paul Sturrock for United's Tayside rivals St Johnstone. During his six years at McDiarmid Park, O'Neil became a regular. He played in nearly 200 league matches, over double his tally over the same length of time with United. In June 2000, O'Neil moved to Hibernian. It was during his spell with the Edinburgh club that O'Neil gained his only cap for Scotland, a start in a 1–1 draw against Poland in an away friendly on 25 April 2001. Ten years earlier, he won his sole under-21 cap.

After three years with Hibs, O'Neil joined Falkirk in 2003 and won a second Scottish First Division title in 2005 before joining Gretna in January 2006. O'Neil won a Second Division title and a third First Division title with The Borderers the following season, also collecting a third Scottish Cup runners-up medal in the defeat on penalties to Hearts. He left Gretna to join Cowdenbeath at the start of the 2007–08 season, signed by former Dundee United teammate Brian Welsh. He scored his first and only goal for Cowdenbeath in a Scottish League Cup loss at former club Gretna. O'Neil was released by Cowdenbeath in January 2009 and then signed for East Stirlingshire.

== Honours ==
Dundee United

- Scottish Cup runner-up: 1991

St Johnstone

- Scottish First Division winner: 1996–97

Hibernian

- Scottish Cup runner-up: 2001

Falkirk

- Scottish First Division winner: 2004–05,
- Scottish Challenge Cup winner: 2004–05

Gretna

- Scottish Cup runner-up: 2006
- Scottish First Division winner: 2006–07
- Scottish Second Division winner: 2005–06
