= David Zitelli =

French footballer (born 1968)

Personal information
- Date of birth: 30 October 1968 (age 58)
- Place of birth: Mont-Saint-Martin, France
- Height: 1.82 m (6 ft 0 in)
- Position: Striker

Senior career*
Years	Team	Apps	(Gls)
1985–1992	Nancy	164	(62)
1992–1995	Metz	92	(30)
1995–1998	Strasbourg	83	(31)
1998–1999	Karlsruher SC	6	(0)
1999–2000	Strasbourg	40	(4)
2000–2002	Hibernian	51	(10)
2002–2003	Istres	15	(2)
Total		451	(139)
- * Club domestic league appearances and goals

David Zitelli (born 30 October 1968) is a French former professional footballer who played as a striker. While at Strasbourg he won the Coupe de la Ligue in 1997, playing in the final.
