= Marc Libbra =

French footballer (born 1972)

Personal information
- Full name: Marc Libbra
- Date of birth: 5 August 1972 (age 54)
- Place of birth: Toulon, France
- Height: 1.89 m (6 ft 2 1/2 in)
- Position: Forward

Senior career*
Years	Team	Apps	(Gls)
1990–1997	Marseille	130	(31)
1992–1993	→ Istres (loan)	10	(1)
1997–1998	Guingamp	13	(1)
1998–1999	AS Cannes	29	(8)
1999–2001	Toulouse	49	(12)
2001	→ Hibernian (loan)	10	(5)
2001–2002	Norwich City	34	(7)
2002–2003	Créteil	30	(5)
2003–2004	Gazélec Ajaccio	25	(10)
2004–2005	Livingston	11	(0)
- * Club domestic league appearances and goals

Marc Libbra (born 5 August 1972) is a French former professional footballer who played as a forward. His previous clubs include Marseille, Norwich City, Toulouse and Hibernian.

Libbra scored a memorable goal on his debut for Norwich City, coming off the bench to score against Manchester City in August 2001. Seven days later he scored a late winner away at Wimbledon. However, he was unable to maintain such form and was released by the club shortly after the start of the 2002–03 season.

Since retiring as a player, Libbra has worked as a football pundit for French television.
