= 2000–01 Scottish Cup =

2000–01 Tennent's Scottish Cup
Tournament details
- Country: Scotland

Final positions
- Champions: Celtic
- Runners-up: Hibernian

Tournament statistics
- Top goal scorer: Henrik Larsson (9)

The 2000–01 Scottish Cup was the 116th staging of Scotland's most prestigious football knockout competition, also known for sponsorship reasons as the Tennent's Scottish Cup. The Cup was won by Celtic who defeated Hibernian in the final.

== First round ==
Home team	Score	Away team
Albion Rovers	1–1	East Fife
Brechin City	3–0	Forfar Athletic
Dumbarton	1–1	East Stirlingshire
Edinburgh City	0–1	Buckie Thistle
Montrose	0–0	Arbroath
Queen of the South	2–0	Clydebank
Stenhousemuir	1–4	Berwick Rangers
Whitehill Welfare	0–0	Peterhead

=== Replays ===
Home team	Score	Away team
East Fife	2–0	Albion Rovers
East Stirlingshire	0–1	Dumbarton
Arbroath	1–2	Montrose
Peterhead	3–0	Whitehill Welfare

== Second round ==
Home team	Score	Away team
Berwick Rangers	3–3	Cowdenbeath
Buckie Thistle	2–0	Hamilton Academical
Coldstream	2–6	Brechin City
East Fife	1–0	Queen's Park
Elgin City	0–1	Queen of the South
Montrose	1–1	Keith
Partick Thistle	3–0	Deveronvale
Peterhead	3–0	Cove Rangers
Spartans	1–3	Stirling Albion
Stranraer	2–0	Dumbarton

=== Replays ===
Home team	Score	Away team
Cowdenbeath	0–1	Berwick Rangers
Keith	0–1	Montrose

== Third round ==
Home team	Score	Away team
Alloa Athletic	0–3	Aberdeen
Berwick Rangers	0–0	Hearts
Dundee	0–0	Falkirk
East Fife	1–4	Livingston
Hibernian	6–1	Clyde
Inverness CT	4–3	Ayr United
Kilmarnock	1–0	Partick Thistle
Montrose	0–2	Dundee United
Peterhead	4–1	Greenock Morton
Queen of the South	1–3	Airdrieonians
Rangers	2–0	Brechin City
Ross County	2–1	Buckie Thistle
Stranraer	1–4	Celtic
St Johnstone	0–0	Dunfermline Athletic
St Mirren	1–2	Motherwell
Stirling Albion	2–0	Raith Rovers

=== Replays ===
Home team	Score	Away team
Dunfermline Athletic	3–2	St Johnstone
Falkirk	0–2	Dundee
Hearts	2–1	Berwick Rangers

== Fourth round ==
Peterhead	v^{1}	Airdrieonians

17 February 2001	Dunfermline	2–2	Celtic	East End Park, Dunfermline
	Skerla 83'; Nicholson 90'		Larsson 66', 88'

17 February 2001	Livingston	0–0	Aberdeen	West Lothian Courier Stadium, Livingston

17 February 2001	Stirling Albion	2–3	Hibernian	Forthbank Stadium, Stirling
	Templeman 4'; Graham 55'		Sauzee 10'; O'Neill 26'; McManus 78'

17 February 2001	Heart of Midlothian	1–1	Dundee	Tynecastle Stadium, Edinburgh
	Juanjo 81'		Sara 30'

17 February 2001	Inverness	1–1	Kilmarnock	Caledonian Stadium, Inverness
	Robson 90'		Hay 90'

17 February 2001	Motherwell	0–2	Dundee United	Fir Park, Motherwell
			Miller 4'; Easton 39'

18 February 2001	Ross County	2–3	Rangers	Victoria Park, Dingwall
	Bone 20', 54'		Flo 4', 17'; Barry Ferguson 62'

1.Peterhead given bye due to Airdrieonians not able to field a full team.

=== Replays ===
6 March 2001	Aberdeen	0–1	Livingston	Pittodrie Stadium, Aberdeen
			Crabbe 83'

6 March 2001	Kilmarnock	2–1	Inverness	Rugby Park, Kilmarnock
	McGowne 60'; Wright 65'		Xausa 51'

7 March 2001	Dundee	0–1	Heart of Midlothian	Dens Park, Dundee
			Tomaschek 71'

7 March 2001	Celtic	4–1	Dunfermline	Celtic Park, Glasgow
	Vega 24', 49'; Larsson 61' (pen.), 73' (pen.)		Thomson 29'

== Quarter-finals ==
10 March 2001	Kilmarnock	0–1	Hibernian	Rugby Park, Kilmarnock
			McManus 89'

10 March 2001	Livingston	3–1	Peterhead	West Lothian Courier Stadium, Livingston
	Anderson 21', 34'; Bingham 61'		Johnston 8'

11 March 2001	Celtic	1–0	Heart of Midlothian	Celtic Park, Glasgow
	Larsson 40'

11 March 2001	Dundee United	1–0	Rangers	Tannadice Park, Dundee
	Hannah 62'

== Semi-finals ==
14 April 2001	Hibernian	3–0	Livingston	Hampden Park, Glasgow
	O'Neil 2', 79'; Zitelli 69'	Report		Attendance: 24,658; Referee: Willie Young

15 April 2001	Celtic	3–1	Dundee United	Hampden Park, Glasgow
	Larsson 32', 79' (pen.); McNamara 80'	Report	Lilley 84'	Attendance: 38,699; Referee: Hugh Dallas

== Final ==
26 May 2001	Celtic	3–0	Hibernian	Hampden Park, Glasgow
	McNamara 39'; Larsson 48', 80' (pen.)	Report		Attendance: 51,824; Referee: Kenny Clark

== Largest Wins ==
A list of the largest wins from the competition.

Score	Home team	Away team	Stage
6-1	Hibernian	Clyde	Third Round
2-6	Coldstream	Brechin City	Second Round
1-4	Stenhousemuir	Berwick Rangers	First Round
1-4	East Fife	Livingston	Third Round
1-4	Stranraer	Celtic	Third Round
4-1	Peterhead	Greenock Morton	Third Round
4-1	Celtic	Dunfermline Athletic	Fourth Round

== Media coverage ==
- Domestically, both Sky Sports and BBC Sport Scotland broadcast selected live games, with both showing the final. Both also carry highlights of all games in every round.
- BBC Radio Scotland has exclusive domestic radio rights to the tournament.
- Through the SFA's international media partner IMG, the Scottish Cup is broadcast in various territories around the world. In Australia, for example, the Scottish Cup is currently available on Setanta Sports.

These matches were broadcast live on television.

Round	Sky Sports	BBC Scotland
Third round	Stranraer vs Celtic	
Fourth round	Ross County vs Rangers	
Quarter-finals	Dundee United vs Rangers	Celtic vs Heart of Midlothian
Semi-finals	Celtic vs Dundee United	
Final	Celtic vs Hibernian	
