= Giant axonal neuropathy =

Neurological disorder

- Other names: Giant axonal disease
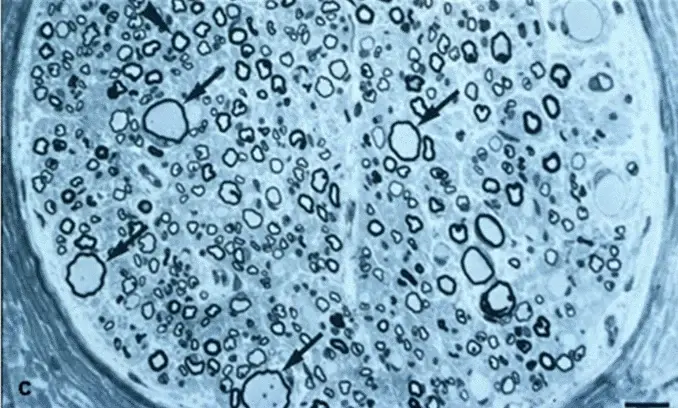
- In this illustration biopsy of the sural nerve can be seen. Electron microscopy of sural nerve biopsy shows enlarged axons (indicated by arrows) surrounded by relatively thin myelin sheaths in contrast to normal axons (indicated by arrowheads).
- Specialty: Neurology
- Usual onset: By age 3.
- Causes: Mutation in GAN gene.
- Differential diagnosis: Charcot-Marie-Tooth disease, Late-infantile metachromatic leukodystrophy,
- Prevention: Genetic counseling
- Prognosis: Generally poor

Giant axonal neuropathy is a rare, autosomal recessive neurological disorder that causes disorganization of neurofilaments. Neurofilaments form a structural framework that helps to define the shape and size of neurons and are essential for normal nerve function. A distinguishing feature is its association with kinky, or curly, hair; in such cases it has been called Giant axonal neuropathy with curly hair.

Approx. more than 100 patients have been recorded and 75 families as of 2024.

== Signs and symptoms ==
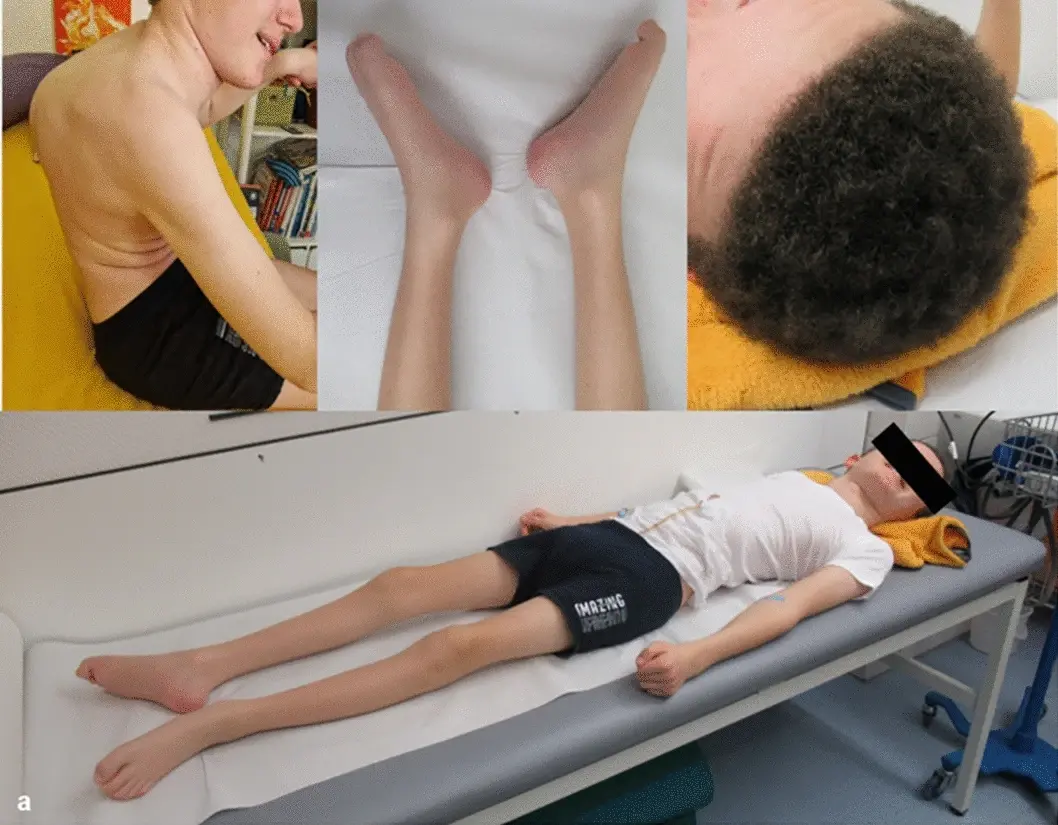
In this illustration patient with Giant Axonal Neuropathy who has typical signs of this disorder, such as contractures of interphalangeal joints, kyphoscoliosis, pes planus, generalised amyotrophy, and frizzy hair.

Very frequent signs of GAN include: Abnormality of the achilles tendon, absent reflexes, deficiency of myelin sheath in CNS, diffuse swelling of axon, impaired gait, kinky hair, generalized decreased muscle tone, weakness in muscles of upper arms and upper legs, hypermobile joint. Also, patients commonly experience cerebellar abnormalities, abnormal hand shape, distal senosory impairment and muscle weakness, spasticity, paralysis of facial nerves, cognitive impairment, scoliosis, cavus foot, and club feet; occasionally patients experience knock knees. Patients with mild form of GAN can have similar symptoms to Charcot-Marie-Tooth disease; also, they have milder curled hair than in those patients with classical form of GAN. Patients with classic GAN have abnormal signals in white matter of the brain and cerebellum.

Patients usually don't live more than 3rd decade due to complications.

== Genetics ==
Giant axonal neuropathy results from mutations in the GAN gene, which codes for the protein gigaxonin. This alters the shape of the protein, changing how it interacts with other proteins when organizing the structure of the neuron.

This disease is an autosomal recessive disorder, which means the defective gene is located on an autosome, and both parents must have one copy of the defective gene in order to have a child born with the disorder. The parents of a child with an autosomal recessive disorder are carriers, but are usually not affected by the disorder.

== Pathophysiology ==
Gigaxonin works by forming complex with CUL3 and RBX1 protein which targets many substrates such as neurofilaments (INA and NEFL) and actin filament–associated regulatory proteins (such as CNN2, TPM1) then promotes their degradation. Neurons affected by the mutated gigaxonin; accumulate excess neurofilaments in the axon, the long extension from the nerve cell that transmits its signal to other nerve cells and to muscles. These enlarged or 'giant' axons cannot transmit signals properly, and eventually deteriorate, resulting in the range of neurological anomalies associated with the disorder.

In one study, the zebrafish model showed the importance of gigaxonin in the SHH signaling pathway, which is important for the development of motor neurons; particularly, it induces degradation of Ptch, which in turn disinhibits another protein, SMO, which then transduces SHH signaling. In that model, SHH pathway was defective which in turn hampered motor neuron development.

== Diagnosis ==
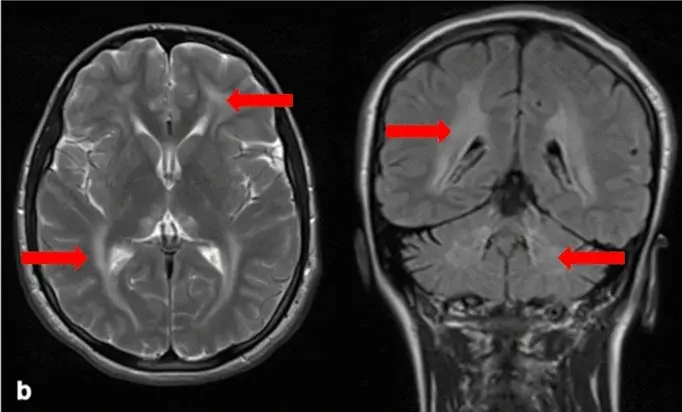
In this illustration brain MRI of the person with Giant Axonal Neuropathy can be seen. Hyperintesities in cerebellar and cerebral white matter can be seen.

Giant axonal neuropathy usually appears in infancy or early childhood, and is progressive. Early signs of the disorder often present in the peripheral nervous system, causing individuals with this disorder to have problems walking. Later, normal sensation, coordination, strength, and reflexes become affected. Hearing or vision problems may also occur. Abnormally kinky hair is characteristic of giant axonal neuropathy, appearing in almost all cases. As the disorder progresses, central nervous system becomes involved, which may cause a gradual decline in mental function, loss of control of body movement, and seizures.

== Treatment ==
Treatment of GAN is focused on symptomatic management (such as: anti-seizure medications, orthopedics, and rehabilitation).

== Research ==
In 2024, a trial for the gene therapy (based on AAV9) was performed for the people with GAN. In this trial, patients showed increased motor function.

== History ==
GAN was described in 1972, and gene that causes GAN was discovered in 2000.

== See also ==
- Polyneuropathy in dogs and cats
