= McWhirter =

McWhirter and Macwhirter, MacWhirter (also spelled McWherter and Macwherter, MacWherter) are Anglicisations of the Scottish Gaelic Mac an Chruiteir, meaning "son of the harpist or fiddler". Mawhorter and McWhorter are less common forms of this Scottish name, and are found in North America. The name is derived from the Gaelic cruitear, meaning "harpist", "fiddler". The Scottish name is generally found in Ayrshire. The surnames can be represented in modern Scottish Gaelic as Mac a' Chruiteir.

== People with the surnames ==
Macwhirter, MacWhirter

- Iain Macwhirter Scottish political commentator
- John MacWhirter (1839–1911), Scottish landscape painter

McWhirter

- Alastair McWhirter (born 1953), British police officer and chief constable
- Anthony McWhirter (1872–1932), Scottish footballer
- Douglas McWhirter (1886–1966), English Olympic football player
- George McWhirter (born 1939), Irish-Canadian writer
- David McWhirter (1948–2005), Texas A&M English Professor
- John McWhirter (contemporary), British mathematician and engineer
- Julie McWhirter (born 1947), American voice actress
- Kent Franklin McWhirter (Kent McCord) American Actor
- Louise McWhirter (1896–1957), writer on financial astrology
- Luella F. McWhirter (1859–1952), American philanthropist, clubwoman, and temperance leader
- Norrie McWhirter (born 1969), Scottish footballer (St. Mirren FC)
- Norris McWhirter (1925–2004), British writer and political activist; cofounder of the Guinness World Records; brother of Ross McWhirter
- Ross McWhirter (1925–1975), British cofounder of Guinness World Records; brother of Norris McWhirter; assassinated
- Steven McWhirter (born 1983), Northern Irish pipe band drummer

McWherter, Macwherter, MacWherter

- Ned McWherter (1930–2011), 46th governor of Tennessee

McWhorter, MacWhorter

- John McWhorter (born 1965), American linguist
- William A. McWhorter (1918–1944), US Army WWII (casualty) Medal of Honor recipient from Liberty, Pickens, South Carolina
- Alexander MacWhorter (1734–1807), American Clergyman
