= Gann =

Gann may refer to

== People ==
- Gann, in Irish mythology, king of the Fomorians
- Gann mac Dela (20th or 16th century BC), joint High King of Ireland
- Ernest K. Gann (1910-1991), author, sailor, fisherman and airline captain
- Kyle Gann (born 1955), composer and music critic
- Thomas Gann (1867–1938), medical doctor and amateur archaeologist
- William Delbert Gann (1878-1955), stock market analyst (see Gann angles)
- Lewis H. Gann, historian
- Dewell Gann Sr., namesake of the Gann Row Historic District in Benton, Arkansas

== Places ==
- Gann, Ohio, USA; former name of small village in Knox County
- Gann Valley, South Dakota, USA; a CDP

== Other uses ==
- Gann Academy (founded 1997), Jewish school

== See also ==
- McGann
- Gan (disambiguation)
