= Afghanistan (disambiguation) =

Afghanistan is a country located at the crossroads of Central Asia and South Asia.

Afghanistan may also refer to:

== States ==
- Durrani Empire (1747–1823), also known as the Kingdom of Afghanistan, a Pashtun-led state led by the Durrani dynasty of rulers
- Emirate of Afghanistan (1823–1926), Afghanistan under the Barakzai dynasty as Emirs
- Kingdom of Afghanistan (1926–1973), Afghanistan under the Barakzai dynasty as Kings
  - Emirate of Afghanistan (1929), a breakaway state during the Afghan Civil War of 1928–1929 run by the Saqqawist regime
- Republic of Afghanistan (1973–1978), Afghanistan under President Daud Khan
- Democratic Republic of Afghanistan (1978–1992), Afghanistan under a Soviet-friendly PDPA (communist) government. It was also known as the "Republic of Afghanistan" after 1987.
- Islamic State of Afghanistan (1992–2002), Afghanistan after the overthrow of communism; reduced to rump state and government-in-exile status from 1996 to 2002, only controlling part of the country
- Islamic Emirate of Afghanistan (1996–2001), Afghanistan under Taliban Islamist rule
- Transitional Islamic State of Afghanistan (2002–2004), a temporary administration of Afghanistan after the overthrow of the Taliban
- Islamic Republic of Afghanistan (2004–2021), Afghanistan under an internationally-backed democracy
- Islamic Emirate of Afghanistan (2021–present), a second period of Afghanistan under Taliban Islamist rule

== Other uses ==
- Afghanis-tan, a 2003–2005 manga series

== See also ==
- Afghan (disambiguation)
- Afghani (disambiguation)
