= Zubieta (surname) =

Zubieta is a surname. Notable people with the surname include:

- Ángel Zubieta (1918-1985), Spanish footballer and manager
- Carlos Goñi Zubieta (born 1963), Spanish philosopher, writer, and teacher
- Maite Zubieta (born 2004), Spanish footballer
- Roberto Alemán Zubieta (1921–2009), Panamanian lawyer, diplomat, politician, and businessman
