= Ghassan Ibrahim =

Syrian journalist (born 1977)

Ghassan Ibrahim غسان إبراهيم
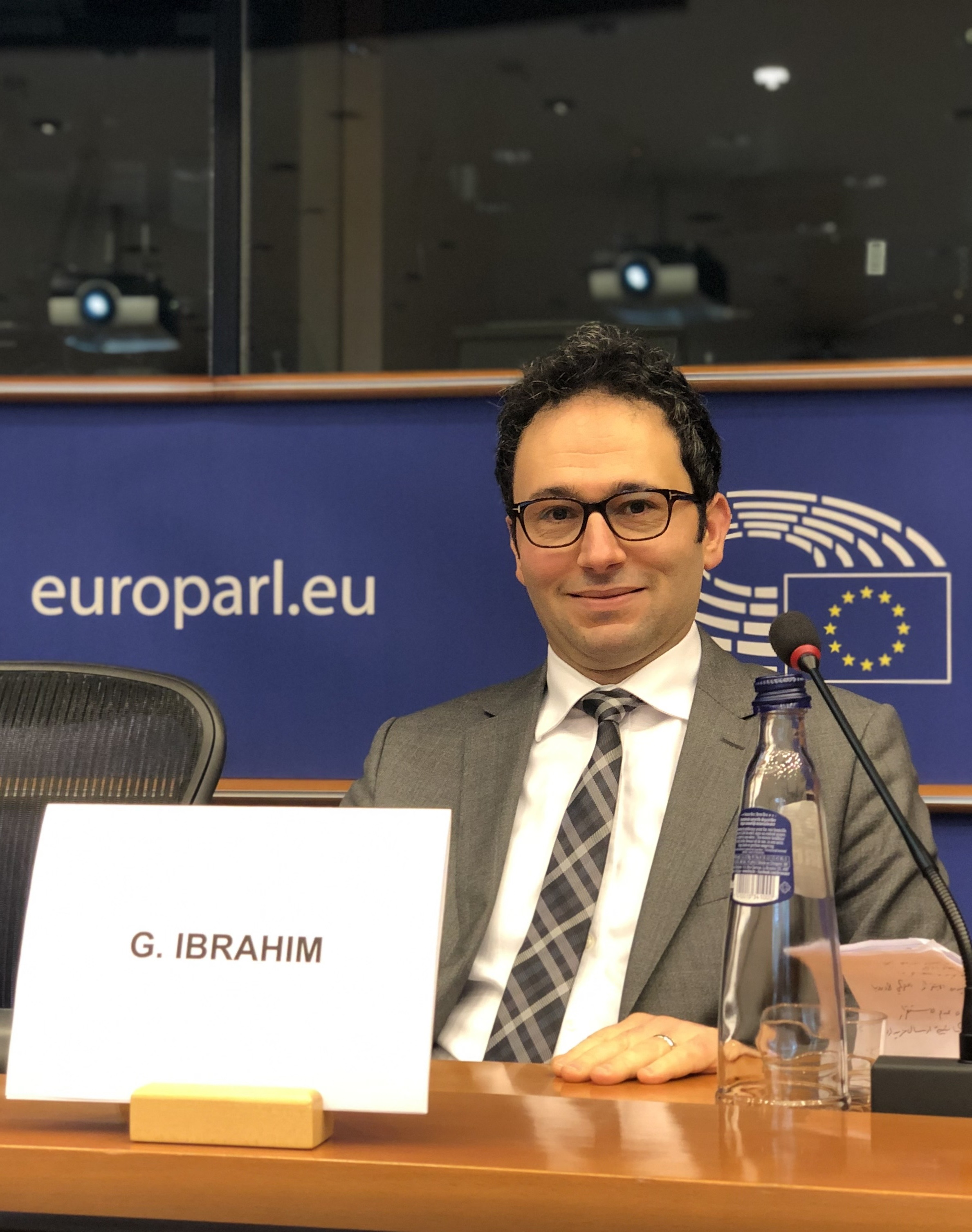
- Ibrahin speaking at the EU Parliament in 2019
- Born: 1977 (age 48–49); Damascus, Syria
- Occupation: Journalist
- Writing career
- Subjects: The Middle East and North Africa, (MENA), Syria
- Website: www.ghassanibrahim.com

Ghassan Ibrahim (born in Syria in 1977) is the Editor in Chief of Global Arab Network and a Syrian journalist.

== Education ==
He studied at Damascus University where he completed his BSc in Economics and a Postgraduate Degree in Finance. In 2000, he came to the UK to study at the University of London, where he completed Economics, Business and Media courses. In 2006 established Global Arab Network.

== Career ==
He is an Editor in Chief of Syria Focus news website about Syria. He was a Managing Editor of the Arabic Department at Ahval, based in London. Research Manager and Journalist at Al-Arab Newspaper, the first Arabic media organization in London, established in 1977. He works as an adviser for several Arab Businessmen and international organizations related to the Middle East and North Africa and appears regularly on British, European and Arab TV channels. He is also a writer about Arab affairs in politics, economics, business and media.
