= Gann angles =

Concept in stock market analysis

The Gann angles are named after W. D. Gann, a 20th-century market theorist. Gann described the use of the angles in the stock market in The Basis of My Forecasting Method, a 33-page course written in 1935. The legitimacy of Gann's techniques has been seriously questioned. Calculating a Gann angle is equivalent to finding the derivative of a particular line on a chart in a simple way.

A Gann angle is a straight line on a price chart, giving a fixed relation between time and price. For Gann the most important angle was the line which represented one unit of price for one unit of time, called the 1x1 or the 45° angle. The value of a commodity or stock following this angle will for example increase by one point per day. Other important angles were the 2x1 (moving up two points per day), the 3x1, the 4x1, the 8x1, and the 16x1. In addition to these value increases, the corresponding angles for value decrease are just as important. When several of these angles are drawn in a group, they are often called a Gann fan, which is usually drawn from a price bottom or a price top.

As with other forms of technical analysis of stock price movements, the Gann angle model contradicts the weakest form of the efficient-market hypothesis which states that past price movements cannot be used to forecast future price movements.

== Using Gann angles ==
Gann watched for important tops and bottoms to form on a daily, weekly, or monthly chart and drew his angles from these changes in trend. When the trend is up and the price stays in the space above an ascending angle without breaking below it, the market is strong; when the trend is down and the price remains below a descending angle without breaking above it, the market is weak. The market shows its relative strength or weakness according to the angle it is above or below. For example, if the price is above the 2x1 the market has shown itself to be much more bullish than if it is above the 1x1. In his angles course, Gann argues that when an uptrending price reverses and breaks under an ascending angle, the tendency of the price is to go to the next nearest angle below it; likewise, when a downtrending price reverses and breaks up through a descending angle, the tendency of the price is to go to the next nearest angle above it.

== Question of scale ==
It is not always practical to give the 1x1 a value of 1 point of price for each day, as Gann observed in his course. If, for example, the Dow Jones Industrial Average is trading around 10,000 points, it can be more helpful to apply a scale in which a certain number of points (like 100 or 1,000) is used as the price unit.

Critics note that Gann did not set down rules for such cases and that the positioning of the angles on a chart is therefore entirely arbitrary and not scientific. This may not necessarily invalidate the methods Gann used himself, as it is not known whether he intentionally left some parts undisclosed.

== See also ==
- Financial astrology
- W. D. Gann
