= Ghani =

Al-Ghani or Ghani (Arabic: الغني) means generous or bountiful in Arabic and is one of the names of God in Islam.

Ghani may refer to:

== People ==
=== Given name or mononym ===
- Ghani Animofoshe (born 1985), Nigerien footballer
- Ghani Yalouz (born 1968), French wrestler and Olympian
- Mullah Ghani (died 2014), briefly governor of Nimruz Province, Afghanistan in 1995
- Ghani Khan (Khan Abdul Ghani Khan, 1914–1996), Pashto language poet

=== Surname ===
- Abdul Ghani, a male Muslim given name, including a list of people with the name
- Ahmed Yasin Ghani (born 1991), Iraqi footballer of Kurdish descent
- Aishah Ghani (1923–2013), Malaysian politician and government minister
- Ali Ghani or Aly Goni (born 1991), Indian actor
- Ashraf Ghani (Mohammad Ashraf Ghani Ahmadzai, born 1949), former president of Afghanistan
- Cyrus Ghani (1929–2015), Iranian-born academic, lawyer, Iranian studies scholar, and film critic
- Hassan Ghani, (born 1985), Scottish broadcast journalist and documentary filmmaker
- Karim Ghani, politician in South-East Asia of Indian origin
- Nazneen Ghaani (born 1986), Indian actress
- Nus Ghani (born 1972), British Conservative Party politician, Member of Parliament (MP)
- Owais Ahmed Ghani (born 1951), former governor of the Khyber Pakhtunkhwa province of Pakistan
- Rula Ghani (born 1948), First Lady of Afghanistan and the wife of Ashraf Ghani
- Tanveer Ghani, British Asian actor
- Usman Ghani (born 1996), Afghanistan cricketer
- Yusof Ghani (born 1950), Malaysian painter, sculptor, writer, professor and curator

== Films ==
- Ghani (2006 film), or The Cycle, a Bangladeshi film
- Ghani (2022 film), an Indian Telugu-language film

== Other uses ==
- Ghani (letter), the 26th letter of the three Georgian scripts

== See also ==
- Goni (disambiguation), alternative transcription
- Banu Ghani, an Arab tribe
- Ghan (disambiguation)
- Afghani (disambiguation)
