= Louise McWhirter =

Financial astrologer

Louise McWhirter (October 19, 1896 – November 1, 1957) was a financial astrologer who purported to use astrology to forecast the financial markets. In 1937, she published her only book, Astrology and Stock Market Forecasting. Some believe that “Louise McWhirter” was only an alias of famous market forecaster W. D. Gann.

== McWhirter’s theory ==
The geocentric view of the movement of the Nodes, which has a cycle of 18.6 years approximately.

=== The Nodal cycle ===
McWhirter's main theory was that the major of primary trend of business volume and finance is clearly pointed out by the 18.6-year cycle of the North Node as it passes through the twelve signs of the zodiac. During a long-term trend, the four crucial points of the stock market are reached when the Node enters the four fixed signs respectively:

- Aquarius: This is the extreme low of business activity, the bottom of the cycle.
- Pisces: The business activity approaches the bottom of the cycle.
- Aries: The business activity starts to fall below the normal level.
- Taurus: The business activity reaches a normal level, but the trend is going down.
- Gemini: The business continues to fall lower towards the normal level.
- Cancer: The business activity fades from the top.
- Leo: This is the extreme high of business activity, the top of the cycle.
- Virgo: The business activity goes even higher.
- Libra: The business activity starts to go above the normal level.
- Scorpio: The business activity reaches a normal level, and the trend is going up.
- Sagittarius: The business continues to go higher towards the normal level.
- Capricorn: The business activity turns up from the bottom.

It has been noted that the four crucial signs (the top, bottom and two break-even points) correspond to the four heads of the cherubim in the Book of Ezekiel.

=== Aspects and positions of major planets ===
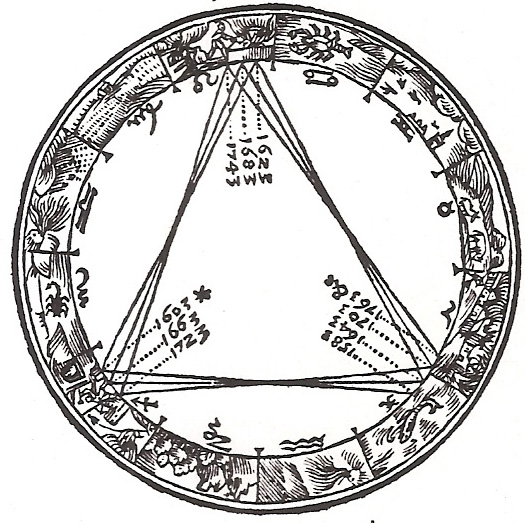
The Jupiter-Saturn conjunction, as depicted in the Kepler's trigon here, is one of the key factors in McWhirter's system.

McWhirter also lists several secondary factors which tend to raise or depress business, mostly related to aspects of major planets like Jupiter, Saturn, Uranus, Neptune and Pluto:

	Favourable	Unfavourable
North Node aspects	Conjunction with Jupiter	Conjunction, opposition, square with Saturn or Uranus
Jupiter aspects	Conjunction, trine, sextile with Saturn or Uranus	N/A
Saturn-Uranus aspects	Trine, sexile, semi-sextile	Conjunction, opposition, square, semi-square
Planet(s) in Gemini	Jupiter, North Node	Saturn, Uranus
Planet(s) in Cancer	Jupiter	N/A
Aspects to Pluto	Conjunction, trine, sextile	Opposition, square, semi-square

=== The NYSE natal chart ===
McWhirter maintained that one should pay attention when a planet moves to 14° Cancer (104°) and 24° Pisces (354°), because these places are where the Ascendant and Midheaven were when the New York Stock Exchange (NYSE) was initiated by an agreement on 17 May 1792, though only after rectifying the exact time to 7:52 am. Similarly, since the tenth house of the NYSE chart was in Pisces and Aries, which are ruled by Neptune and Mars respectively, she also thought that aspects to these two planets are important.

=== New moon analysis ===
In a shorter timeframe, McWhirter uses the new moon for timing market turns. The key idea is that she would pay attention to planets which make an astrological aspect to the new moon, and watch them as the moon passes through them later.

== Comparison with W. D. Gann ==
=== Identity suspicion ===
M. G. Bucholtz suspects that “Louise McWhirter” is not the author's real name. His reason is that he comes across no other books by McWhirter and finds no other sources mentioning this person. He believes that the real identity of Louise McWhirter was famous market forecaster W. D. Gann, whom Bucholtz believes used similar techniques in market predictions. According to Pythagorean numerology, the names “W. D. Gann” and “Louise McWhirter” share the same numerological root of “9”. It is possibly not a coincidence, since some people believe that Gann was an numerologist.

=== Gann’s financial timetable ===
One of the biggest connection between McWhirter and Gann is that McWhirter's Nodal cycle theory is very similar to Gann's “financial timetable”. It is timetable with alternating 18- and 19-year cycle, which mimics the Nodal cycle very closely. Like McWhirter's theory, Gann also found that the stock market follows a rhythm of 18–19 years. Here is a modernised example of the table:

Major Low	1990	2008	2027	2045
Major Low	1991	2009	2028	2046
Booming	1992	2010	2029	2047
Booming	1993	2011	2030	2048
Booming	1994	2012	2031	2049
Major High	1995	2013	2032	2050
Major High	1996	2014	2033	2051
Correction	1997	2015	2034	2052
Correction	1998	2016	2035	2053
Major Top	1999	2017	2036	2054
Major Top	2000	2018	2037	2055
Big Crash	2001	2019	2038	2056
Big Crash	2002	2020	2039	2057
Major Low	2003	2021	2040	2058
Major Low	2004	2022	2041	2059
Major High	2005	2023	2042	2060
Major High	2006	2024	2043	2061
Major Top	2007	2025	2044	2062
Major Top	--	2026	--	2063
