= The Tunnel Thru the Air; Or, Looking Back from 1940 =

1927 novel by William Delbert Gann

- Author: William Delbert Gann
- Set in: Science fiction
- Published: 1927

The Tunnel Thru the Air, Or, Looking Back from 1940 is a science fiction novel written by market forecaster William Delbert Gann in 1927. In the Foreword, Gann hinted that this book is more than just a novel because it "contains a valuable secret, clothed in veiled language. Some will find it the first time they read it, others will see it in the second reading, but the greatest number will find the hidden secret when they read it the third time." Some traders believe Gann has encoded some techniques of financial astrology into this book.

== Plot ==
The story is roughly divided into two parts: before and after 1927, the year in which it was written. The story begins in early morning of June 10, 1906, with the protagonist Robert Gordon's mother reflecting on his birth the evening before. The early part of the book is mostly about Robert's early life, including how he found and lost his true love, Marie Stanton, who was born on October 6, 1908. The loss of Marie Stanton inspired Robert to become the greatest inventor in history. After 1927, the book describes an imaginary war from April 1930 to July 1932, in which Robert single-handedly helps the United States to win with his amazing inventions.
