= Gan =

The word Gan or the initials GAN may refer to:

== Places ==
- Gan, a component of Hebrew placenames literally meaning "garden"

=== China ===
- Gan River (Jiangxi)
- Gan River (Inner Mongolia),
- Gan County, in Jiangxi province
- Gansu, abbreviated Gān (甘), province of China
- Jiangxi, abbreviated Gàn (赣), province of China

=== Maldives ===
- Gan (Addu Atoll)
- Gan (Gaafu Dhaalu Atoll)
- Gan (Huvadhu Atoll)
- Gan (Laamu Atoll)
- Gan International Airport

=== Elsewhere ===
- Gáň, a village and municipality in Galanta District, Trnava Region, south-west Slovakia
- Gan Island, an island in the Addu Atoll in the Indian Ocean that used to be an RAF airbase
- Gan, Norway, a village in Lillestrøm municipality, Norway
- Gan, Pyrénées-Atlantiques, a commune in the Pyrénées-Atlantiques département, France

== Science and technology ==
- GAN (gene)
- Gan (Martian crater)
- Gallium nitride, chemical formula GaN, a semiconductor used in electronics
- Generative adversarial network, a class of machine learning systems
- Generic Access Network, formerly known as Unlicensed Mobile Access (UMA)

== People ==
- Gan (surname), a surname in various cultures (including a list of people with the surname)
- Gamal Abdel Nasser (1918–1970), president of Egypt
- Gösta Adrian-Nilsson (1884–1965), Swedish painter, signature "GAN"
- Ga-Adangbe people
- Jiang Gan, a Chinese debater and scholar
- Luo Gan (born 1935), a Chinese politician

== Fictional characters ==
- Gan (Stephen King), in King's Dark Tower novel series
- Gan Isurugi, in the Rival Schools video game series
- Olag Gan, in the Blake's 7 television series and franchise

== Other ==
- GAN (cycling team), the former name of the Crédit Agricole cycling team
- Gan Chinese-speaking people
- Gan Chinese, a variety of spoken Chinese
- Gan International Airport, IATA code
- Global Apprenticeships Network, a not-for-profit association based in Geneva
- Global Arab Network, a London-based news service about the Arab world
- Grant Anticipation Note, a type of highway financing
- Great American Novel, commonly abbreviated as GAN
- GANCUBE, a Chinese speedcubing company, abbreviated as GAN

== See also ==
- Bryan McGan (1848–1894), Australian cricketer
- Gahan
- Gahn
- Ghan (disambiguation)
- Gann (disambiguation)
- 幹 (disambiguation)
