= Goñi =

Goñi may refer to:

- Goñi, Navarre, a village in northern Spain
- Almirante Goñi, the former name of the ship HMS Broke (1914)

== People with the surname ==
- Adrien Goñi (born 1988), Spanish football player
- Ainhoa Goñi (born 1979), Spanish tennis player
- Ana Goñi (born 1953), Venezuelan rally driver
- Antonio Peña y Goñi (1846–1896), Spanish musicologist
- Ascensión Nicol y Goñi (1868–1940), Spanish Roman Catholic religious sister
- Carlos Goñi Zubieta (born 1963), Spanish philosopher, writer and teacher
- Ernesto Goñi (born 1985), Uruguayan football player
- Eñaut Zubikarai (born 1984), Spanish football player
- Gonzalo Goñi (born 1998), Argentine football player
- Iker Muniain (born 1992), Spanish football player
- Iosu Goñi Leoz Leoz (born 1990), Spanish handball player
- Itsaso Leunda (born 1984), Spanish racing cyclist
- Javier Goñi Lopéz (born 1986), Spanish swimmer
- José Goñi, Chilean diplomat and politician
- Mayra Goñi, Peruvian actress and singer
- Ricardo Sanzol (born 1976), Spanish football player
- Samuel Goñi (born 1994), Spanish football player
- Tomás Garicano Goñi (1919–1988), Spanish military lawyer, governor and politician
- Uki Goñi (born 1953), Argentine author
- Wilson Elso Goñi (1938–2009), Uruguayan politician

== See also ==
- Goni (disambiguation)
