= Paul Lambert =

Scottish footballer and manager (born 1969)

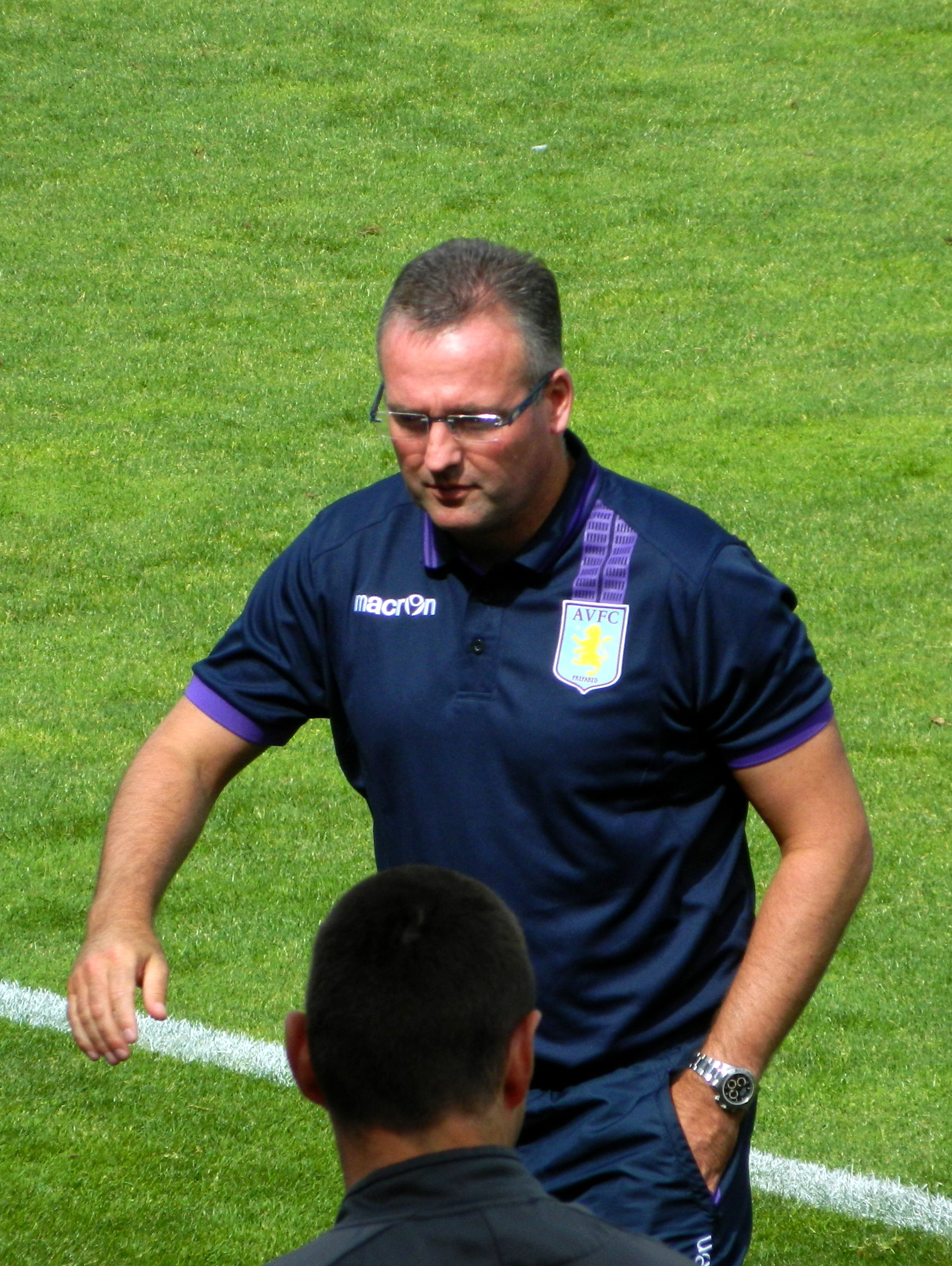
- Lambert in 2013

Personal information
- Full name: Paul Lambert
- Date of birth: 7 August 1969 (age 57)
- Place of birth: Paisley, Scotland
- Height: 5 ft 11 in (1.81 m)
- Position: Midfielder

Youth career
- 1985–1986: St Mirren

Senior career*
Years	Team	Apps	(Gls)
1986–1993	St Mirren	227	(14)
1993–1996	Motherwell	103	(6)
1996–1997	Borussia Dortmund	44	(1)
1997–2005	Celtic	193	(14)
2005–2006	Livingston	7	(0)
Total		574	(35)

International career
1990	Scottish League XI	1	(0)
1991–1992	Scotland U21	5	(2)
1995–1996	Scotland B	2	(2)
1995–2003	Scotland	40	(1)

Managerial career
- 2005–2006: Livingston
- 2006–2008: Wycombe Wanderers
- 2008–2009: Colchester United
- 2009–2012: Norwich City
- 2012–2015: Aston Villa
- 2015–2016: Blackburn Rovers
- 2016–2017: Wolverhampton Wanderers
- 2018: Stoke City
- 2018–2021: Ipswich Town
- * Club domestic league appearances and goals

Paul Lambert (born 7 August 1969) is a Scottish professional football manager and former player.

Lambert played as a midfielder and won the Scottish Cup in 1987 with St Mirren as a 17-year-old, the UEFA Champions League with Borussia Dortmund and all the Scottish domestic honours with Celtic. In his international career, Lambert earned 40 caps for Scotland and played in the 1998 FIFA World Cup.

Lambert had success managing Wycombe Wanderers. After a short spell managing Colchester United, he guided Norwich City into the English Premier League with successive promotions in 2009–10 and 2010–11. After keeping Norwich in the Premier League in 2011–12, he managed Aston Villa for three seasons. Lambert was appointed Blackburn Rovers manager in November 2015, before leaving the club in May 2016. Lambert became head coach of Wolverhampton Wanderers in November 2016 but was dismissed at the end of the season.

Lambert was appointed manager of Stoke City in January 2018, but he was unable to prevent relegation to the Championship and left the club soon afterwards. Six years after leaving Norwich, Lambert became manager of fellow East Anglia club Ipswich Town in October 2018. He was unable to prevent Ipswich's relegation to League One, and left the club in February 2021 after failing to mount a promotion challenge.

== Club career ==
=== St Mirren ===
Lambert was born in Paisley, and grew up inLinwood, Renfrewshire when he was a child. He played for Linwood Rangers Boys' Club before entering the professional game with St Mirren in 1985. With St Mirren, the 17-year-old Lambert won his first senior winner's medal courtesy of the 1987 Scottish Cup Final; Saints beat favourites and that season's UEFA Cup Finalists Dundee United, in what turned out to be the last time the Scottish Cup was won by a team composed entirely of Scottish players. Due to his age, manager Alex Smith had to send the youngster home early from the alcohol-fuelled celebrations. Lambert played with St Mirren for eight years, experiencing relegation from the top tier in 1992.

=== Motherwell ===
In September 1993, Lambert was signed by Tommy McLean for Motherwell for a fee of £250,000 in a transfer move that saw Jimmy Gardner move to St Mirren. The club finished in 3rd place at the end of the 1993–94 season in the Scottish Premier League.

With Alex McLeish replacing McLean for the 1994–95 season, Lambert and Motherwell went one place better finishing league runners-up, the club's highest finish since 1933–34. The club also qualified for a place in the 1994–95 UEFA Cup. After eliminating Faroese opponents, HB Tórshavn, Motherwell were drawn against German Bundesliga team Borussia Dortmund, managed by Ottmar Hitzfeld. In the away first leg, Motherwell lost to a solitary goal by Andreas Möller in the 58th minute. In the second leg, Motherwell were still in the contest, until Karl-Heinz Riedle scored twice in ten minutes during the second half.

Lambert won the club's Supporters Player of the Year, while he was also shortlisted for the SPFA Players' Players award in 1996. He left Motherwell at the end of the 1995–96 season under freedom of contract, as new rules were implemented following the Bosman ruling.

=== Borussia Dortmund ===
After leaving Motherwell, an agent arranged trial spells for Lambert with PSV Eindhoven and Borussia Dortmund. PSV did not sign Lambert as they were looking for a winger, but he signed for Dortmund after a pre-season tournament. Dortmund manager Ottmar Hitzfeld had previously been impressed by Lambert when the club had played Motherwell in the 1994–95 UEFA Cup. Portuguese international Paulo Sousa had also signed for Dortmund that summer. Sousa had been expected to play in Lambert's position, but Lambert performed well in early Bundesliga matches and kept a place in the team.

Dortmund had been the German champions in the previous two seasons, but struggled to keep pace with Bayern Munich in 1996–97, eventually finishing third in the Bundesliga. In the 1996–97 UEFA Champions League, though, Dortmund progressed through the group stage as runners-up. They then beat Auxerre and Manchester United to reach the Champions League final, against Juventus. He had scored one goal during the group stage, the first in a 2–2 draw at Widzew Łódź. His performance in the semi-final elimination of Manchester United, when Dortmund were missing several key players due to injuries, was later praised in the autobiography of United midfielder Roy Keane.

Lambert played in the Champions League final as a defensive midfielder, quelling the influence of Juve's French playmaker Zinedine Zidane. Lambert's cross also set up Karl-Heinz Riedle's opening goal as Dortmund won 3–1. His contribution has since been lauded as a Man of the Match performance. He became the first British person to win the European Cup with a non-UK team, and the first British person to win the tournament since its reformation as the Champions League in 1992.

It was announced the Champions League group stage game on 5 November 1997 against Parma, his 23rd in European club competitions, would be Lambert's last before he returned to Scotland. His departure was prompted by his son suffering a febrile seizure after the Champions League final: having previously experienced this when living in Scotland, the family decided to return home to be closer to relatives. He was given a rousing send off by the Dortmund fans, and reciprocated with a banner he had prepared thanking the Dortmund fans for their support. Lambert scored one domestic league goal during his time with Dortmund, against Bayer Leverkusen.

=== Celtic ===
In November 1997, after just over a year playing in the Bundesliga, appearing in 44 matches, he was signed by Wim Jansen for Celtic for a fee in the region of £2 million. Lambert made his debut on 8 November 1997 when he came on as a substitute in a league match at Ibrox against Rangers. Three weeks later on 30 November 1997, Lambert picked up his first winner's medal as a Celtic player when he came on as a late substitute in Celtic's 3–0 win over Dundee United in the Scottish League Cup Final. Thereafter, Lambert became a regular in the starting line-up and scored from 25 yards in a 2–0 win over Rangers at Parkhead in the New Year game. Lambert went on to help the Scottish giants win the championship that season, their first in ten years, halting Rangers' run of nine consecutive titles which had previously equalled the total achieved by Celtic in the Jock Stein era.

During his seven seasons with Celtic, he won four Scottish Premier League titles, two Scottish Cups, two Scottish League Cups and was Scottish Football Writer's Player of the Year and was shortlisted SPFA Player of the Year again in 2002 Lambert captained the team that reached the 2003 UEFA Cup Final in Seville; his team were drawing 2–2 after 90 minutes but after having a man sent off in extra time, conceded a third and decisive goal to José Mourinho's Porto.

== International career ==
During Lambert's international career, he was involved in a memorable Under-21 game against Germany. The young Scots drew 1–1 in Bochum in the 1992 UEFA European Under-21 Football Championship quarter-finals. In the return leg at Pittodrie, Germany were two up after 40 minutes before Duncan Ferguson set up Ray McKinnon to pull one back before half-time. Germany scored a third on the hour mark to seemingly put the tie out of reach. However, on 68 minutes, Gerry Creaney headed past Stefan Klos before Lambert himself equalised ten minutes later. Alex Rae scored two minutes from time to clinch the game 4–3.

As a full Scotland international, Lambert won 40 caps, scoring one goal. In the latter part of his international career, he captained the team 15 times. His international debut came whilst at Motherwell and awarded by Craig Brown in the 1995 Kirin Cup against host country, Japan. Lambert played a second game in the tournament three days later against Ecuador.

Whilst at Dortmund and during the 1998 FIFA World Cup qualification campaign Lambert started to appear as a regular. After missing the opening game of the campaign against Austria, Lambert appeared as a 46th-minute substitute in the 2–0 win in Latvia in October 1996. He was also in the starting line-up for the next fixture against Estonia in Tallinn four days later, but a scheduling dispute meant the home team did not adhere to a quickly-rearranged afternoon kick-off time, and the match was abandoned at kick-off with no caps awarded to the Scotland players (the fixture was re-arranged for the following February, but Lambert was an unused substitute). He was again a substitute in the next qualifier which was played, coming on in the 46th minute of a 1–0 home win against Sweden. For his next cap, he was promoted to the starting line-up for a 2–0 home victory in the qualifier against Austria. Lambert's only defeat of the campaign was the 2–1 reversal in Gothenburg against Sweden before two wins against Belarus and a second 2–0 win against Latvia clinched qualification.

He played in all three of Scotland's matches at the 1998 FIFA World Cup, a 2–1 defeat against Brazil in the tournament's opening match, a 1–1 draw against Norway and a 3–0 defeat against Morocco.

Lambert was part of the Scotland team that won away against Germany in April 1999 with the goal scored by Don Hutchison. Lambert and Scotland qualified for a play-off place in the 2000 UEFA European Football Championship qualifying campaign, but Lambert missed the play-offs against England due to suffering an injury in the Old Firm game played the weekend before. Craig Brown cited Lambert's absence as crucial to England's progression at Scotland's expense, since he intended to deploy Lambert directly against Paul Scholes, scorer of both England goals.

He scored his only goal for Scotland on 7 September 2002, in a Euro 2004 qualifier against the Faroe Islands, which ended in a 2–2 draw. Lambert was awarded Man of the Match in a 1–1 draw with Germany in June 2003. His final cap came in a 2–1 defeat against Germany in September 2003. The match was played in Dortmund, where he had achieved great success during his club career.

On 15 November 2009, he was inducted into the Scottish Football Hall of Fame.

== Managerial career ==
=== Livingston ===
After studying for football coaching qualifications in 2005, Lambert landed his first managerial job with Livingston on 1 June 2005, assisted by Norrie McWhirter. Although he had not intended to play for his new club, Lambert registered as a player in late August 2005 to cover for any injury shortages. His tenure ended in February 2006 when he resigned after only winning two league games since starting the job.

=== Wycombe Wanderers ===
Lambert was appointed manager of English team Wycombe Wanderers on 30 June 2006. He led Wycombe to the League Cup semi-finals after defeating Premier League teams Fulham and Charlton Athletic. The semi-final tie, against Premier League champions Chelsea, saw Wycombe hold Chelsea to a 1–1 draw at Adams Park before losing the away leg. This was the first time in over 30 years a fourth-tier team had reached that stage of the League Cup. Lambert resigned as Wycombe manager on 20 May 2008 following the club's elimination from the League Two play-offs by Stockport County.

=== Colchester United ===
On 9 October 2008, he was appointed as manager of League One team Colchester United to succeed Geraint Williams, before winning his first game 2–1 at Stockport County. Despite occasionally threatening to flirt with the League One play-offs, the U's eventually finished mid-table in Lambert's first season. On 8 August 2009, he began the 2009–10 season with an opening day 7–1 win over Norwich City. Lambert left the Essex club for Norwich shortly afterwards.

=== Norwich City ===
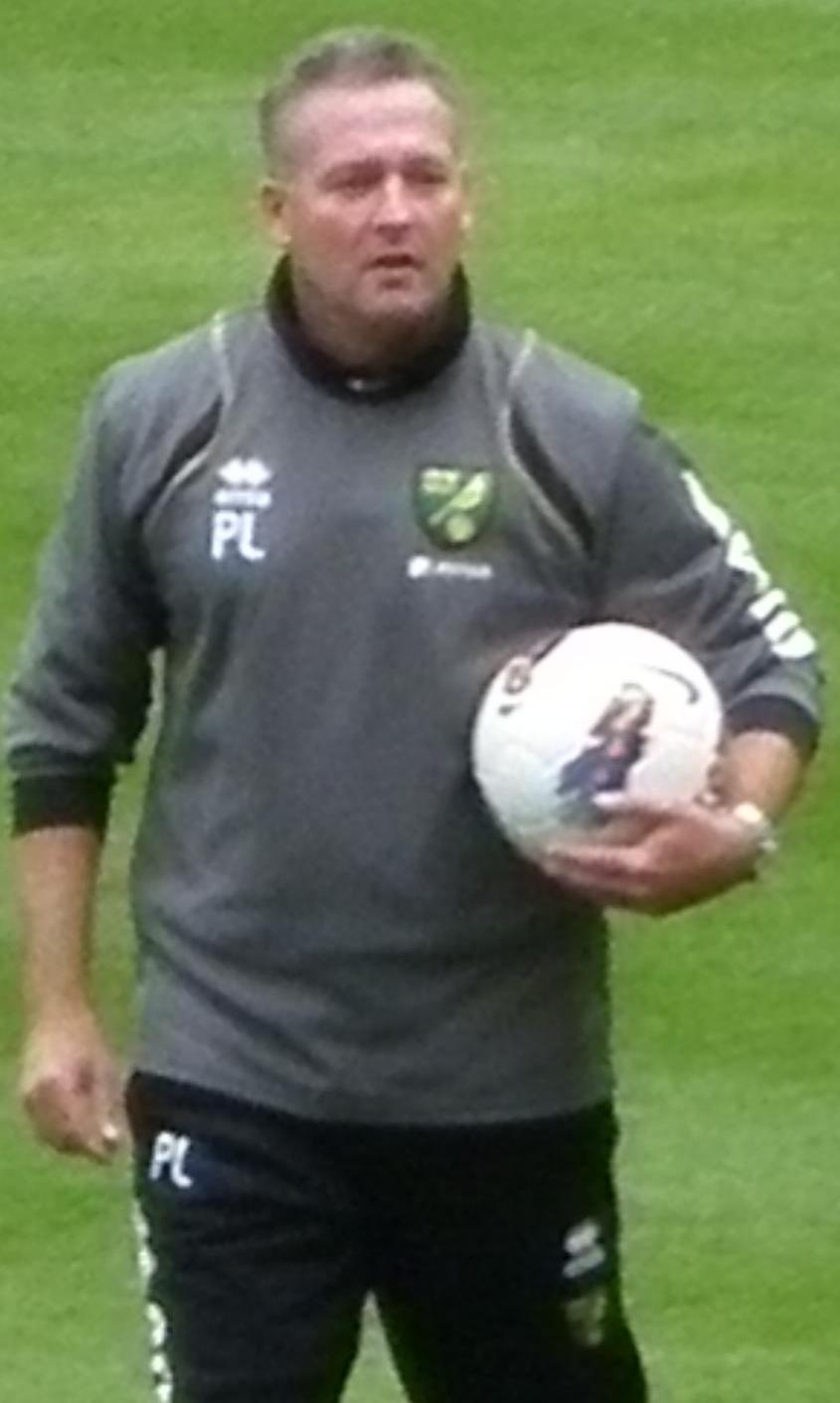
Lambert managing Norwich City in 2011

Lambert became the new manager of Norwich City on 18 August 2009, replacing Bryan Gunn, who was dismissed by the club shortly after the 7–1 home defeat to Lambert's Colchester. Lambert's new team would go on to win the return fixture 5–0 on their way to the League 1 title, earning promotion to the Championship, in April 2010.

On 1 June 2010, he signed an improved contract with Norwich after it was confirmed Colchester United were entitled to £425,000 in compensation, in addition to Norwich City being fined £75,000, with a further £125,000 suspended for two years.

Norwich's form from their 2009–10 promotion campaign continued into the 2010–11 season, which saw them gain a second successive promotion – becoming the first team to achieve a second successive promotion at this level since Manchester City 11 years earlier. During Lambert's first two seasons in charge, Norwich did not suffer two successive defeats in the league in the same season.

In January 2011, Norwich refused to allow Burnley permission to try to secure Lambert as their new manager, following the dismissal of Brian Laws. The Norwich statement read, in part, "The club will fight tooth and nail to retain the services of Paul Lambert and his team during this critical period of the season and whilst they remain employed under a long-term contract". On 2 May 2011, Lambert and Norwich secured promotion to the Premier League after a win over Portsmouth, taking the second automatic spot with one game to spare. Lambert signed a new contract to extend his stay with the Norfolk club. He was inducted into the Norwich City Hall of Fame in March 2012.

Following Norwich's survival in the Premier League in the 2011–12 season, Lambert offered his resignation on 31 May 2012, but the club declined it.

=== Aston Villa ===
==== 2012–13 season ====
On 2 June 2012, Lambert was confirmed as the new manager of Aston Villa replacing Alex McLeish, who was dismissed two weeks earlier. Lambert's first competitive match as Aston Villa manager came on the opening day of the Premier League season on 18 August 2012, a 1–0 defeat to newly promoted West Ham United at Upton Park. His first Premier League win came on 15 September 2012, a 2–0 victory against Swansea City at Villa Park. He was handed a one-match touchline ban on 21 November 2012 for comments relating to a penalty decision in Villa's defeat to Manchester City. On his first return to Carrow Road, Lambert received a mixed reception from the Norwich fans on 11 December 2012, in a League Cup quarter-final which his Villa team won 4–1.

On 23 December 2012, Villa were defeated 8–0 against Chelsea at Stamford Bridge, the club's heaviest ever defeat in top-flight football. This was followed by consecutive home defeats, with Villa losing 4–0 to Tottenham Hotspur and 3–0 to Wigan Athletic, leading to increased pressure on Lambert's position. On 22 January 2013, Villa played Bradford City in the second leg of the League Cup semi-final at Villa Park, having lost the first round tie 3–1 at Valley Parade. The final score on the night was a 2–1 win for Villa, leaving an aggregate score of 4–3 to Bradford.

Lambert kept his job despite the poor run as the team flirted with the relegation places continuously over the next few months. Lambert did however manage to get Villa to record back-to-back wins for the first time since May 2011, as they defeated fellow relegation rivals Reading and Queens Park Rangers. He then oversaw the club's biggest victory since 2008, as Villa thrashed Sunderland 6–1. Villa finished 15th with the youngest starting eleven in the Premier League, leading to praise from pundit Alan Hansen, who said that Lambert was "a contender for Manager of the Season." Highlights of the season included Lambert's summer acquisition of star striker Christian Benteke, the introduction of Villa's Player of the Season, goalkeeper Brad Guzan, reaching the semi-finals of the League Cup and securing Villa's place in the Premier League for the 2013–14 season.

==== 2013–14 season ====
Lambert's Aston Villa team began the season brightly, with a 3–1 win over Arsenal at Emirates Stadium on 17 August. Towards the end of 2013, the performances worsened greatly, especially home form, and Lambert was criticised by many fans and pundits for putting out a counter-attacking team with no plan B. Possession stats were biased towards the opposition in many games, including at home to Swansea; Villa had less than 30 percent of possession in a game which ended 1–1. In January 2014, Lambert made headlines by stating that "many Premier League clubs could do without the distraction of the FA Cup if they were being honest." Aston Villa subsequently lost 2–1 at home to Sheffield United, a team two divisions below them, marking the fourth consecutive year that Lambert has been eliminated from the FA Cup by lower league opposition. Lambert subsequently defended his comments, stating they were "taken out of context."

==== 2014–15 season ====
Lambert's third season in charge saw a different approach in the transfer market, with him opting to buy players with experience as opposed to the previous seasons, where the club would sign young prospects. Aston Villa started off well, with a 1–0 victory over Stoke City. This was then followed by a 0–0 draw against Newcastle United, a 2–1 win over Hull City and a 1–0 victory over Liverpool. During this time, the new back four of Alan Hutton, Ron Vlaar, Philippe Senderos and Aly Cissokho was praised by Lambert after gaining three clean sheets out of a possible four, whilst gaining ten points out of an available 12.

After Villa's good start to the season, however, they then went on to have a five-game long goal drought, losing to Arsenal, Chelsea, Manchester City, Everton and QPR before scoring in a 2–1 loss at Villa Park to Tottenham. Villa then went on to gain some valuable points, drawing 0–0 with West Ham and 1–1 against Southampton. They then won 1–0 against Crystal Palace at Selhurst Park, courtesy of a Christian Benteke goal, followed with a 2–1 victory over Leicester City at Villa Park.

On 11 February 2015, Villa announced they had parted company with Lambert after a 2–0 loss at Hull, leaving the club 18th in the Premier League table. His departure also meant that the top flight did not have a Scottish manager for the first time in 30 years. On 14 February, Tim Sherwood was announced as his successor.

=== Blackburn Rovers ===
Lambert was appointed manager of Championship club Blackburn Rovers on 15 November 2015 on a two-and-a-half-year deal, with the club in 16th place following the dismissal of Gary Bowyer. Lambert secured Championship safety for Blackburn with a 2–2 draw against Bristol City on 23 April 2016. Blackburn ended the season with two consecutive wins, finishing in 15th place. The club confirmed that Lambert had activated a release clause in his contract, and would step down as manager after their last match of the 2015–16 season on 7 May 2016.

=== Wolverhampton Wanderers ===
On 5 November 2016, Lambert was appointed head coach of Championship club Wolverhampton Wanderers, taking over with the team in 19th place. The team achieved an upset victory in the fourth round of the 2016–17 FA Cup, winning 2–1 against Liverpool at Anfield. The team finished the 2016–17 EFL Championship season in 15th place.

On 30 May 2017 the club announced that they and Lambert had "agreed to part company following a football review".

=== Stoke City ===
On 15 January 2018, Lambert was appointed manager of Premier League club Stoke City, signing a two-and-a-half-year contract with the Potters, and officially took up post the following day. He joined Stoke with the club in the relegation zone, having dismissed previous manager Mark Hughes due to a poor run of form. His first game in charge was a 2–0 victory over relegation rivals Huddersfield Town to move them out of the relegation places.

His only permanent signing in charge was the deadline day signing of Senegalese midfielder Badou Ndiaye from Turkish club Galatasaray for a fee of £14 million. Furthermore, the club completed the signing of Kostas Stafylidis on loan from FC Augsburg until the end of the season.

Lambert was unable to prevent Stoke's continued decline and relegation to the Championship, leaving the club via mutual agreement in May 2018 after four months in charge.

=== Ipswich Town ===
Six years after leaving Norwich, on 27 October 2018 Lambert was appointed manager of Championship club Ipswich Town. He was the first ever-person to manage both Norwich and Ipswich. He joined his new team on a contract until the summer of 2021, with the team bottom of the Championship. On 10 February 2019, Lambert was sent off following a touchline bust-up with the opposing team staff during a game against former club and rivals Norwich City. He was subsequently fined and handed a two match touchline ban by the FA. Lambert later stated he did not regret his actions that led to his dismissal. Lambert was ultimately unable to keep Ipswich in the division, as relegation was confirmed on 13 April 2019. This ended Ipswich's 17-year stay in the Championship, resulting in them playing third-tier football for the first time since 1957.

Despite the team's relegation, Lambert remained in charge and led Ipswich to the top of the League One table during the first month of the 2019–20 season, winning 14 league points out of possible 18 during August. He won the EFL League One Manager of the Month award for August 2019. On 1 January 2020, Lambert signed a new five-year contract with the club until 2025. Despite a strong start, Lambert failed to achieve promotion with the team finishing in 11th after the league was determined on a points-per-game basis due to the COVID-19 pandemic.

On 27 October 2020, he was given a one-match touchline ban for directing foul and abusive language towards referee Kevin Johnson. He was also fined £1,000. Lambert tested positive for COVID-19 in December 2020, which resulted in the postponement of two league matches. Despite winning his two last games in charge against Hull City and Doncaster Rovers, Lambert left Ipswich by mutual consent on 28 February 2021 after failing to mount a promotion push during the season due to inconsistent form.

== Career statistics ==
=== Club ===
Appearances and goals by club, season and competition
Club	Season	League			National cup		League cup		Continental		Total	
Club	Season	Division	Apps	Goals	Apps	Goals	Apps	Goals	Apps	Goals	Apps	Goals
St Mirren	1985–86	Scottish Premier Division	1	0					0	0	1+	0+
St Mirren	1986–87	Scottish Premier Division	36	2					—		36+	2+
St Mirren	1987–88	Scottish Premier Division	36	2					4 (Note: Appearances in UEFA Cup Winners' Cup)	0	40+	2+
St Mirren	1988–89	Scottish Premier Division	16	2					—		16+	2+
St Mirren	1989–90	Scottish Premier Division	25	3					—		25+	3+
St Mirren	1990–91	Scottish Premier Division	31	2					—		31+	2+
St Mirren	1991–92	Scottish Premier Division	40	2					—		40+	2+
St Mirren	1992–93	Scottish First Division	39	1					—		39+	1+
St Mirren	1993–94	Scottish First Division	3	0					—		3+	0+
St Mirren	Total		227	14					4	0	231+	14+
Motherwell	1993–94	Scottish Premier Division	32	3					="2"|—		32+	3+
Motherwell	1994–95	Scottish Premier Division	36	1					3 (Note: Appearances in UEFA Cup)	0	39+	1+
Motherwell	1995–96	Scottish Premier Division	35	2					2	0	37+	2+
Motherwell	Total		103	6					5	0	108+	6+
Borussia Dortmund	1996–97	Bundesliga	31	1	1	0	—		11 (Note: Appearances in UEFA Champions League)	1	43	2
Borussia Dortmund	1997–98	Bundesliga	13	0	3	0	2	0	3	0	21	0
Borussia Dortmund	Total		44	1	4	0	2	0	14	1	64	2
Celtic	1997–98	Scottish Premier Division	26	2	4	0	1	0	—		31	2
Celtic	1998–99	Scottish Premier League	33	1	5	0	1	0	8 (Note: Four appearances in UEFA Champions League, four appearances in UEFA Cup)	0	47	1
Celtic	1999–2000	Scottish Premier League	25	1	0	0	0	0	5	0	30	1
Celtic	2000–01	Scottish Premier League	27	1	6	0	2	0	5	0	40	1
Celtic	2001–02	Scottish Premier League	34	5	4	0	1	0	10 (Note: Eight appearances in UEFA Champions League, two appearances in UEFA Cup)	0	49	5
Celtic	2002–03	Scottish Premier League	31	3	1	0	3	1	13 (Note: Two appearances in UEFA Champions League, eleven appearances and two goals in UEFA Cup)	2	48	6
Celtic	2003–04	Scottish Premier League	13	1	1	1	2	0	6 (Note: Four appearances in UEFA Champions League, two appearances in UEFA Cup)	0	22	2
Celtic	2004–05	Scottish Premier League	4	0	2	0	1	1	0	0	7	1
Celtic	Total		193	14	23	1	11	2	46	2	273	19
Livingston	2005–06	Scottish Premier League	7	0	2	0	1	0	—		10	0
Career total			574	35	29+	1+	14+	2+	69	3	686+	41+

=== International ===
Appearances and goals by national team and year
National team	Year	Apps	Goals
Scotland	1994-95	2	0
Scotland	1995-96	0	0
Scotland	1996-97	5	0
Scotland	1997-98	8	0
Scotland	1998-99	5	0
Scotland	1999-00	4	0
Scotland	2000-01	2	0
Scotland	2001-02	4	0
Scotland	2002-03	8	1
Scotland	2003-04	2	0
Total		40	1

Scores and results list Scotland's goal tally first, score column indicates score after each Lambert goal.

List of international goals scored by Paul Lambert
No.	Date	Venue	Opponent	Score	Result	Competition	Ref.
1	7 September 2002	Svangaskarð, Toftir, Faroes	Faroe Islands	1–2	2–2	UEFA Euro 2004 qualifying	

=== Managerial record ===
As of match played 27 February 2021

Managerial record by team and tenure
Team	From	To	Record					Ref.
Team	From	To	P	W	D	L	Win %	Ref.
Livingston	1 June 2005	11 February 2006	32	5	7	20	15.6	
Wycombe Wanderers	30 June 2006	20 May 2008	108	44	29	35	40.7	
Colchester United	9 October 2008	18 August 2009	43	19	7	17	44.2	
Norwich City	18 August 2009	2 June 2012	142	70	35	37	49.3	
Aston Villa	2 June 2012	11 February 2015	115	34	26	55	29.6	
Blackburn Rovers	15 November 2015	7 May 2016	33	12	8	13	36.4	
Wolverhampton Wanderers	5 November 2016	30 May 2017	33	14	5	14	42.4	
Stoke City	16 January 2018	18 May 2018	15	2	7	6	13.3	
Ipswich Town	27 October 2018	28 February 2021	113	37	28	48	32.7	
Total			634	237	152	245	37.4	—

== Honours ==
=== Player ===
St Mirren

- Scottish Cup: 1986–87

Borussia Dortmund

- UEFA Champions League: 1996–97

Celtic

- Scottish Premier Division/Scottish Premier League: 1997–98, 2000–01, 2001–02, 2003–04
- Scottish Cup: 2000–01, 2003–04
- Scottish League Cup: 1997–98, 2000–01
- UEFA Cup runner-up: 2002–03

Scotland U21

- UEFA under-21 Euros: Bronze 1992
- Toulon Tournament: Bronze 1991

Individual

- Motherwell Player of the Year: 1996
- SFWA Footballer of the Year: 2002
- Scottish Football Hall of Fame: Inducted 2009
- Scottish Football League Player of the Month: January 1998

=== Manager ===
Norwich City

- Football League One: 2009–10
- Football League Championship runner-up: 2010–11

Individual

- Football League One Manager of the Month: January 2009, December 2009, January 2010, August 2019, September 2020
- Football League One Manager of the Year: 2009–10
- Football League Championship Manager of the Month: March 2017
- Football League Championship Manager of the Year: 2010–11
- Norwich City FC Hall of Fame

== See also ==
- List of footballers in Scotland by number of league appearances (500+)
- List of Scotland national football team captains

Sporting positions
Preceded by Tom Boyd	Celtic F.C captain 2002–2004	Succeeded by Jackie McNamara
