= Afghan =

Afghan or Afgan may refer to:

== Related to Afghanistan ==
- Afghans, historically refers to the Pashtun people. It is both an ethnicity and nationality. Ethnicity wise, it refers to the Pashtuns. In modern terms, it means both the citizens of Afghanistan and Afghans, a country in Central Asia (of any ethnicity)
  - Afghan (ethnonym), the historic term applied strictly to people of the Pashtun ethnicity
  - Ethnic groups in Afghanistan, people of various ethnicities that are nationally Afghan
- Afghan (biscuit)
- Afghan (blanket)
- Afghan coat
- Afghan cuisine
- Afghan Hound, a dog breed originating in parts of Afghanistan and the surrounding regions
- Afghan rug
- Afghanistan, shortened colloquial name in the Russosphere for the country during the Soviet-Afghan war

== People ==
=== Given name ===
- Afghan Muhammad (died 1648), Afghan khan in modern-day Russia

=== Surname ===
- Sediq Afghan (born 1958), Afghan philosopher
- Asghar Afghan (born 1987), former Afghan cricketer
- Azad Khan Afghan (died 1781), Afghan commander and ruler

=== Stage name ===
- Afgan (singer) (born 1989), Indonesian musician

== Other uses ==
- The Afghan, a 2006 thriller novel by Frederick Forsyth
- Afghan (Australia), camel drivers from Afghanistan and Pakistan who came to the Australian outback
- Afghan, Iran, a village in Sistan and Baluchestan Province, Iran

== See also ==
- Afghan Breakdown, 1991 Soviet film
- Afghan Girl, a 1984 photographic portrait of an Afghan refugee
- Afghani (disambiguation)
- Ghan (disambiguation)
- The Ghan, a passenger train in Australia
