= Goni =

Goni may refer to:

- Goni, Sardinia, Italy
- List of storms named Goni, a list of typhoons in the northwestern Pacific Ocean

== People with the name ==
- Aly Goni (born 1991), Indian actor
- Antigoni Goni (born 1969), Greek guitarist, recording artist and performer
- Arabi El Goni (1920–1973), Chadian politician
- Goni, nickname of Gonzalo Sánchez de Lozada (born 1930), Bolivian former president
- Mohammed Goni (born 1942), Nigerian civil servant
- Raúl Goni (born 1988), Spanish football player

== See also ==
- Goñi (disambiguation)
- Gony (disambiguation)
- Ghani (disambiguation)
- Gani, a name
