= Ghan =

Ghan or variation, may refer to:

== Places ==
- Ghan, Northern Territory, a locality in Australia

== People ==
- Ghans, a name sometimes used for Afghan cameleers in Australia
- Emiliano Ghan (born 1995) Uruguayan soccer player

=== Fictional characters ===
- Ghân-buri-Ghân (aka Ghân), a character from J.R.R.Tolkien's The Lord of the Rings

== Rail ==
- The Ghan, an Australian passenger train service
- The Old Ghan, an informal name for the former Central Australia Railway
- Old Ghan, a steam train tourist service in Australia - see Pichi Richi Railway

== See also ==
- Gahan
- Gahn
- Afghan (disambiguation)
- Ghani (disambiguation)
- Gan (disambiguation)
