= Gony =

Gony may refer to:

== People ==
- Manpreet Gony (born 1984), Indian cricket player

== Places ==
- Gony Point

== See also ==
- Goni (disambiguation)
