= Al-Arab =

London-based Arabic language newspaper

Al-Arab العرب
- العرب لكل العرب "Al-Arab for all Arabs"
- Type: Morning daily newspaper
- Owner: Ahmad Al Houni
- Publisher: Arab World Foundation for Press and Publication
- Founded: 1977; 49 years ago
- Language: Arabic
- Headquarters: London, England
- Website: alarab.co.uk thearabweekly.com

Al-Arab or Alarab (Arabic: العرب meaning The Arabs) is a pan-Arab newspaper published from London, England, and sold in a number of countries.

== History and profile ==
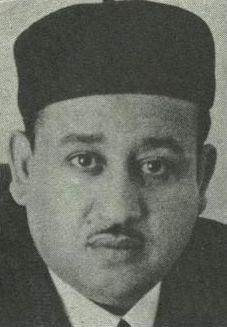
Ahmed el-Houni in 1968

The paper was launched in London on 1 June 1977, as a secular pan-Arab daily. Ahmed el-Houni, a former Libyan minister of information, was the owner and editor-in-chief of the daily. Al-Arab sometimes reflected official Libyan government views and was run, as of 2004, by the Hounis as a family business, producing 10,000 copies that were also being printed in Tunisia and distributed throughout the Arab world, with the exception of some countries where it was banned. It has undergone a series of expansions over the years, which included the launching of sister publications such as the magazine Al-Jadid and The Arab Weekly.

Its 10,000th issue, consisting of 24 pages, was published on 7 August 2015 and featured Egyptian president Abdel Fattah el-Sisi and the New Suez Canal on its front page. The Al-Arab media organization also helped fund Ahval, a news website launched by Yavuz Baydar, a Turkish journalist who left Turkey following the 2016 Turkish coup d'état attempt. Qantara.de suspected Al-Arab and the government of the United Arab Emirates of influencing the creation of Ahval's Arabic language service.
