= Ahval =

Online news portal focused on Turkey

- Website type: Digital Media
- Available in: English, Arabic, Turkish
- Editor: Yavuz Baydar Ghassan Ibrahim
- Website: ahvalnews.com
- Commercial: Yes
- Launched: 2017
- Content license: Copyright

Ahval is an Emirati-funded online news website that solely reports on Turkey. The site was launched in 2017. Turkish journalist Yavuz Baydar is the current editor-in-chief. The name Ahval means "events" and is a Turkish Arabism derivation from "ahwal".

In February 2018, Ahval was blocked by the Turkish government for users in Turkey. In an interview with observatoireturquie.fr, Baydar stated that the site has 230,000 daily visitors.

Talking to German newspaper Süddeutsche Zeitung, Baydar said that the creation of Ahval aimed "to fill a gap caused by media bans and self-censorship in Turkey."

The (English language) pages do not show any new articles since early November 2022.

== Ownership ==
The website is owned by Ahval News Ltd, which is based in Cyprus. According to Qantara.de Ahval are financially supported by London media organisation "Al Arab", who are subsidized by the United Arab Emirates. Qantara criticised Ahval's Arabic language service for not being as neutral as its English language version. Baydar responded to claims about Ahval's funding by an undemocratic regime by saying "whatever your financier, what matters is independence. When I worked in England, at the BBC World Service, it was never a problem for me to have this institution partially funded by the London government." The Turkish government claims that Ahval is used as a counter-propaganda tool against Turkey’s president.

== Criticism ==
=== Alleged links to Gülen movement ===
Ahval has been accused by Turkey of having links to the Gülen movement, which Turkey sees as a terrorist organization and blames it for the failed coup attempt in 2016. Editor-in-chief Yavuz Baydar, who left Turkey following the coup attempt in 2016, had prosecution cases opened against him in Turkey in 2016 on charges of ties to the Gülen movement.

In October 2018, the 27th High Criminal Court in Istanbul reportedly wanted Ilhan Tanır to be charged along with Can Dündar. Tanir, formerly head of Ahval's English desk, and Cumhuriyet's Washington correspondent at the time, denies these links. Editor Ergun Babahan is also accused of being a follower of Fethullah Gülen.

Yavuz Baydar denies that the site has any affiliation with Gülen. He states that "We are not the mouthpiece of any interest group nor are we part of any activist movement." Ahval has published critical commentary on Gülen's movement by authors like Nick Ashdown and Gökhan Bacık. Bacık had left the Gülen movement and "started writing critical and highly informative pieces on both the Gülen movement and Islamic conservatism." Turkish journalist Cengiz Candar, writing for al-Monitor, noted that "Police raids of residences have targeted many linked to the failed coup. But to associate Baydar with the coup is impossible."

=== Bias in Arabic version ===
The Arabic version of Ahval is criticized for not demonstrating political neutrality on topics regarded as sensitive subjects by the regimes in Saudi Arabia and United Arab Emirates such as the Muslim Brotherhood. An example is a piece by Al-Arab journalist Hisham al-Nagar which did not appear in the English and Turkish versions. In the article, the Egyptian journalist tried to associate President Erdogan with Islamist terrorism.
