= Norrie McWhirter =

Scottish footballer

Personal information
- Full name: Norrie McWhirter
- Date of birth: 4 September 1969 (age 57)
- Place of birth: Johnstone, Scotland
- Position: Defender

Senior career*
Years	Team	Apps	(Gls)
1985–2000	St Mirren	301	(84)

Managerial career
- 2002–2004: Ayr United (assistant)
- 2005–2006: Livingston (assistant)
- * Club domestic league appearances and goals

Norrie McWhirter (born 4 September 1969) is a Scottish former footballer, who played for St Mirren.

== Playing career ==
McWhirter played for St Mirren the entirety of his career which began in 1985 and ended due to injury in 2000, following 301 appearances for the club. He received a testimonial match against Kilmarnock in 1999.

McWhirter was inducted to the St Mirren Hall of Fame in 2009.

== Coaching career ==
Campbell Money appointed McWhirter as his assistant at Ayr United in 2002. The pair left the club in 2004 after refusing to take substantial pay cuts in their salaries and to go part-time.

He was appointed as Paul Lambert's assistant at Livingston in May 2005. They both left the club in 2006 when Lambert resigned from his role as manager.

== See also ==
- List of one-club men
