= Yusof Ghani =

Yusof Ghani (born 1950 in Johor, Malaysia) is a Malaysian painter, sculptor, writer, professor and curator. His career spans over three decades which resulted into diverse series that deals with Southeast Asian motifs with an Abstract Expressionist approach. His works blend painting and drawing into a visual entity with controlled play of sculptural and collage elements.

== Early life and education ==
As a young boy in a small town in Johor, he enjoyed watching movies in a small cinema close to his house that was run by a family member. Watching Western movies such as cowboy films developed his interest in painting to depict movement visually and a sense of time in his pictures early on. Originally a graphic artist in Malaysia between 1969 and 1979, Yusof Ghani's transition to fine arts started when he received a scholarship from the government of Malaysia to study graphic arts at George Mason University, Virginia, in 1979. It was there that he met Walter Kravitz, a professor in painting, who introduced him to fine arts.

He soon became interested in the works of the American Abstract Expressionist painters such as Jackson Pollock and Willem de Kooning. After receiving the Dr. Burt Amanda Scholarship for the most outstanding student of art, Yusof took classes in fine arts and eventually graduated with a bachelor's degree. He then continued to work for a master's degree at the Catholic University of America in Washington, D.C., and met Professor Tom Nakashima, who taught him the finer points in painting. While studying at the Catholic University, he be-friended the Malaysian artist Awang Damit whose style is influenced by Abstract Expressionism.

After he completed his master's degree, he had his first solo exhibition at the prestigious Anton Gallery in Washington, D.C. His Protest series, which protested the US intervention in Nicaragua and El Salvador at that time, was well received and even drew rave reviews from The Washington Post's art critic – Jo Ann Lewis.

== Career ==
Upon returning to Malaysia, Yusof continued to work with a series of collection called Tari (Dance), Topeng (Mask), Wayang (Theater), Hijau (Green), Segerak (A Movement), Biring (Fighting Cockerals), Wajah (Faces), and currently working on Ombak (Waves).

Currently, his mature works deals with contemporary issues concerning Malaysian society such as social issues regarding famine and injustice, the nation's history, distortions of Asian motifs and depiction of visual energy. Ghani was an associate professor at the Faculty of Art and Design, Universiti Teknologi MARA, Selangor, Malaysia. While at UiTM, He taught many young artists that became popular contemporary artists in Malaysia such as Yusri Sulaiman. He is currently represented by ESPI Fine Arts in Malaysia.

He has done a number of successful solo and group shows in-

Solo shows –

- Indonesia – Wajah II (2010)
- Canada – Wajah (2009)
- Hong Kong – Segerak IV (2008)
- Malaysia – Segerak III (2006), Segerak (2004), Hijau 1998 – 2002 (2002), Topeng (1993), Tari (1989)
- USA (Washington and San Francisco) – Topeng – Wayang (1997), Protest (1984)
- Singapore – Hijau – Rhythm of Nature (2000), Topeng III (1996)

Group Shows –

- Malaysia
- Beijing, China
- Wanchai, Hong Kong
- Karachi, Pakistan
- Bangkok, Thailand
- Singapore
- London, U.K
- New York City
- San Francisco, USA
- Abu Dhabi, UAE
- New Delhi, India
- Madrid, Spain
- Tokyo, Japan
- Baghdad, Iraq
- Washington, USA

His works are in numerous public collections such as –

- Amerada Hess, Kuala Lumpur Malaysia
- Anton Gallery, Washington DC, USA
- Artfolio Gallery, Singapore
- Ascott, Kuala Lumpur, Malaysia
- Bank Negara Malaysia, Kuala Lumpur, Malaysia
- BASF, Kuala Lumpur, Malaysia
- CCM, Kuala Lumpur, Malaysia
- Changi Airport, Singapore
- Concorde Hotel, Shah Alam, Malaysia
- DIGI Telecommunication, Kuala Lumpur, Malaysia
- Earl Lu Gallery, Singapore
- Equatorial Hotel, Penang/Kuala Lumpur, Malaysia
- Galeri Citra, Kuala Lumpur, Malaysia
- Galeri Shah Alam, Shah Alam, Malaysia
- HEITECH PADU, Subang Jaya, Malaysia
- Hijjaz Kasturi & Associates, Kuala Lumpur, Malaysia
- Istana Mestika, Shah Alam, Malaysia
- Istana Negara, Kuala Lumpur, Malaysia
- Jenkins Johnson Gallery, San Francisco, USA
- Kelab Darul Ehsan, Kuala Lumpur, Malaysia
- Malayan Banking, Kuala Lumpur, Malaysia
- Malaysia Mining Corporation, Kuala Lumpur, Malaysia
- Malaysian Airlines, Kuala Lumpur, Malaysia
- MTC, Kuala Lumpur, Malaysia
- National Art Gallery, Kuala Lumpur, Malaysia
- Oriental Bank, Kuala Lumpur, Malaysia
- Paremba, Kuala Lumpur, Malaysia
- PNB, Kuala Lumpur, Malaysia
- Petronas Refinery, Melaka, Malaysia
- Petronas KLCC, Kuala Lumpur, Malaysia
- Sapura Holding, Kuala Lumpur, Malaysia
- Sheraton Hotel, Subang Jaya, Malaysia
- Silterra Corporation, Malaysia
- Singapore Art Museum, Singapore
- Spanco Malaysia, Kuala Lumpur, Malaysia
- Solar Alert, Malaysia
- Southern Bank, Kuala Lumpur, Malaysia
- Standard Chartered Bank, Kuala Lumpur, Malaysia
- State Development Corporation, Kuching, Malaysia
- The Aliya & Farouk Khan Collection, Kuala Lumpur, Malaysia
- Tokyo Gas, Tokyo, Japan
- UMW Toyota, Kuala Lumpur, Malaysia
- UNILEVER, Kuala Lumpur, Malaysia
- Wisma Putra, Putrajaya, Malaysia
- Youth Center, Washington D.C, USA
- YTL Corporation, Kuala Lumpur, Malaysia
- Zain & Co, Kuala Lumpur, Malaysia

== Private life ==
Yusof Ghani currently lives in Shah Alam, Malaysia with his wife and four children. He regularly exhibits and also curates shows for mid-career and young artists in and around Kuala Lumpur, Malaysia.

== Yusof Ghani Paintings ==
Yusof Ghani artworks are displayed and exhibited in his Tapak Gallery in Shah Alam. To purchase his Ombak or Segerak series, browse through the stockroom of www.malaysianfineart.com

== Honour ==
=== Honour of Malaysia ===
- Selangor
  - Knight Companion of the Order of Sultan Sharafuddin Idris Shah (DSIS) – Dato' (2025)
