= Global Arab Network =

Global Arab Network (غلوبال اراب نتورك)
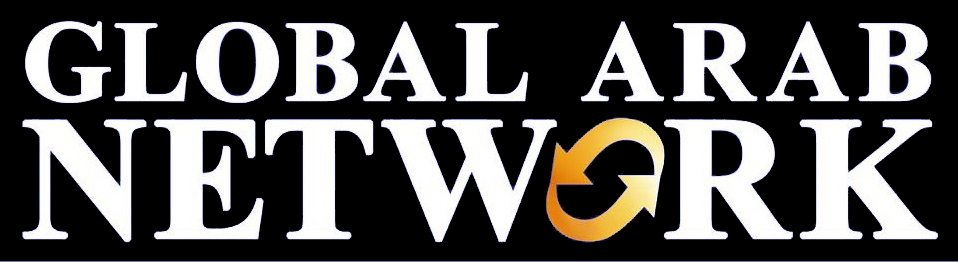
- Company type: International organizations, Business organizations
- Industry: Business
- Founded: 2006
- Headquarters: London, UK
- Area served: MENA, Worldwide
- Key people: Ghassan Ibrahim (editor in chief)
- Website: english.globalarabnetwork.com

Global Arab Network (GAN) (in Arabic غلوبال اراب نتورك) is a comprehensive news and information service about the Arab world in English and Arabic, registered and based in London, UK.

Founded in 2006, GAN covers news and information from the Middle East and North Africa concerning national and international affairs, relations between the Arab countries and the rest of the world, economy and business, foreign policy, science and technology, culture and society, entertainment and lifestyle. ".

Global Arab Network is one of the Strategic Partners of The Middle East Association
