= Interphalangeal joint =

Interphalangeal joint may refer to:

- Interphalangeal articulations of hand
- Interphalangeal articulations of foot
