= Yavuz Baydar =

Turkish journalist

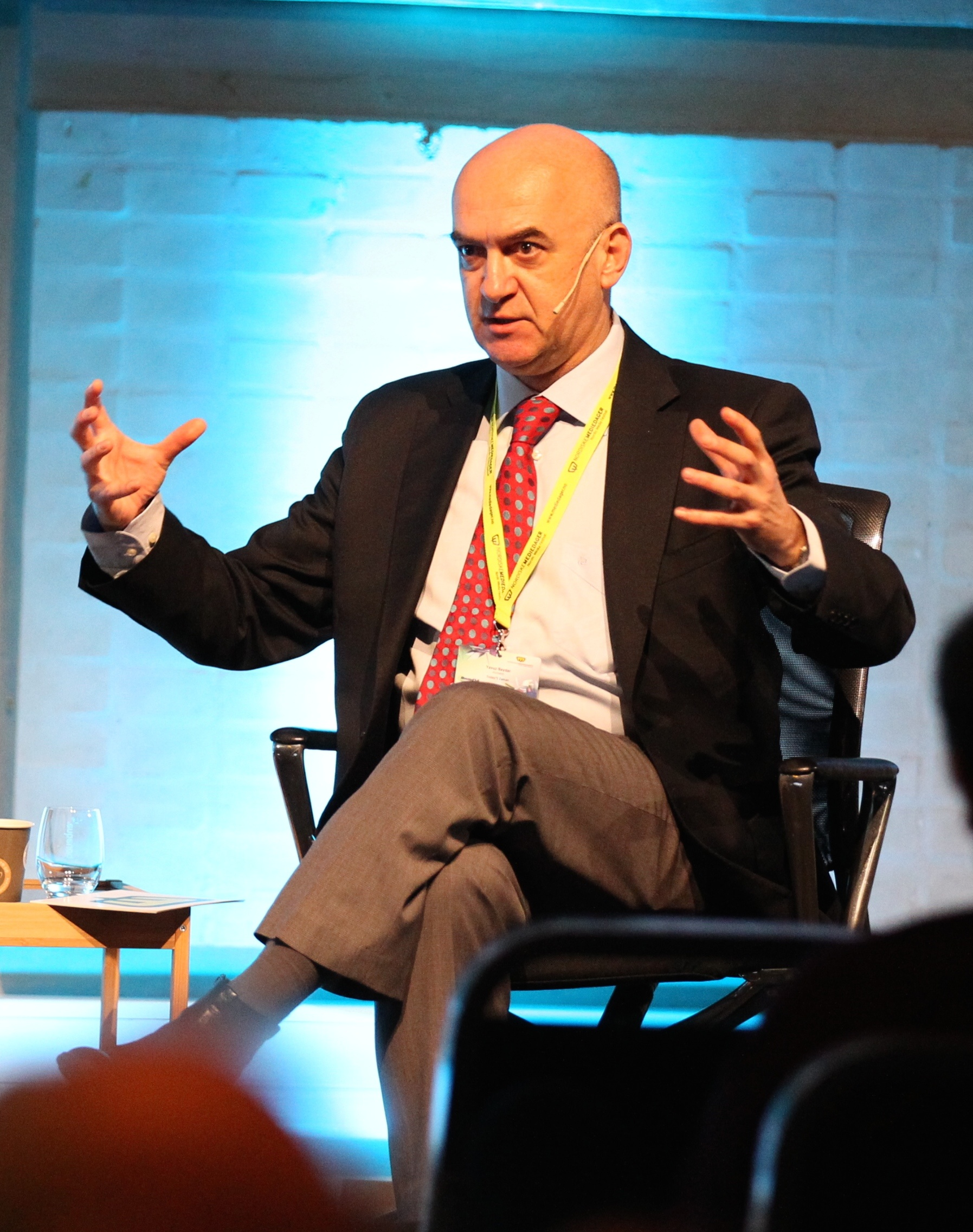
- Yavuz Baydar, 2014
- Occupation: Journalist
- Known for: Editor-in-chief of Ahval, co-founder of P24

Yavuz Baydar is the Editor-in-Chief of Ahval, an online news site published in English, Turkish and Arabic. Baydar is a Turkish journalist, blogger and an activist for media freedom and independence.

Baydar has lived outside Turkey since the 2016 failed Turkish coup d'etat. According to NordicMonitor, "Dozens of Turkey’s leading journalists and academics were the subject of criminal investigations on fabricated allegations of terrorism" following the 2016 failed coup, including Baydar.

== Awards ==
Over the years, Baydar was given several awards: In 2018, the prestigious 'Journalistenpreis' by the (Munich-based) SüdostEuropa Gesellschaft in Germany.

In 2014, he was delivered the Special Award by the European Press Prize for his censored criticism of the daily paper Sabah's Gezi Park protests. He received the Morris B Abram Human Rights Award by UN Watch in 2017.
