= Gigaxonin =

Protein-coding gene in the species Homo sapiens

GAN
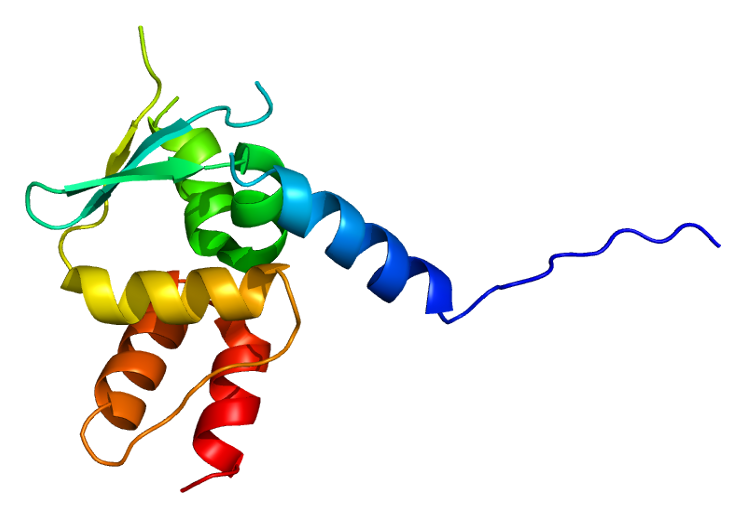

Identifiers
- Aliases: GAN, GAN1, KLHL16, gigaxonin, GIG, giant axonal neuropathy gene, GAN gene
- External IDs: OMIM: 605379; MGI: 1890619; GeneCards: GAN
Available structures
| PDB | Ortholog search: PDBe RCSB |
| PDB | List of PDB id codes 2PPI, 3HVE |

Gene location (Human)
| Chr. | Chromosome 16 (human) |
| Band | 16q23.2 | Start | 81,314,944 bp |
| Band | 16q23.2 | End | 81,390,809 bp |
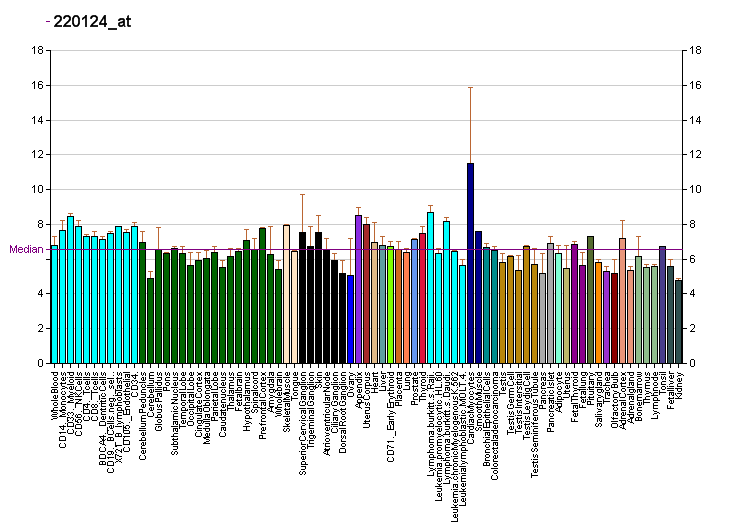
RNA expression pattern
| Bgee | Human / Mouse (ortholog); Top expressed in: skin of thigh; skin of hip; human penis; vulva; nipple; gingival epithelium; testicle; skin of abdomen; corpus callosum; oral cavity / n/a; More reference expression data |
| BioGPS | More reference expression data |
Gene ontology
| Molecular function | protein binding; ubiquitin-protein transferase activity; molecular function |
| Cellular component | cytoplasm; Cul3-RING ubiquitin ligase complex; cytoskeleton; cytosol |
| Biological process | cytoskeleton organization; protein ubiquitination; post-translational protein modification |
Sources:Amigo / QuickGO
Orthologs
| Databases | NCBI: entry; OMA: entry |
| Species | Human | Mouse |
| Entrez | 8139 | 209239 |
| Ensembl | ENSG00000261609 | ENSMUSG00000052557 |
| UniProt | Q9H2C0 | Q8CA72 |
| RefSeq (mRNA) | NM_022041; NM_001377486 | NM_001081151 |
| RefSeq (protein) | NP_071324 | NP_001074620 |
| Location (UCSC) | Chr 16: 81.31 – 81.39 Mb | n/a |
| PubMed search |
- Wikidata
| View/Edit Human | View/Edit Mouse |

Gigaxonin also known as kelch-like protein 16 is a protein that in humans is encoded by the GAN gene.

== Function ==
Gigaxonin is a member of the cytoskeletal BTB / kelch (Broad-Complex, Tramtrack and Bric a brac) repeat family. (Kelch repeats are predicted to form a beta-propeller shape.) Gigaxonin plays a role in neurofilament architecture and is mutated in giant axonal neuropathy.

== See also ==
- Giant axonal neuropathy with curly hair
