= Afghani =

Afghani may refer to:

- Afghan afghani, the official currency of Afghanistan
  - An Afghan, a person or thing of, from, or related to Afghanistan (although this usage is viewed as improper)
- al-Afghani, a nisba denoting a person from Afghanistan
- Pashto language
- Jamal al-Din al-Afghani, Muslim nationalist and modernist in the late 19th century
- Jamila Afghani, Afghan feminist and women's rights activist
- Sajjad Afghani, Pakistani militant
- Kevin Afghani, voice actor and current voice of Mario, Luigi, Wario, and Waluigi

== See also ==
- Afghan (disambiguation)
- Ghani (disambiguation)
