= Carlos Goñi Zubieta =

Spanish philosopher, writer and teacher (born 1963)

- Born: 7 April 1963 (age 61); Obanos, Navarra, Spain
- Occupation: Philosopher and teacher

Carlos Goñi Zubieta (born 7 April 1963) is a Spanish philosopher, writer and teacher. He has a doctor's degree in philosophy from Universitat de Barcelona.

Zubieta is married to Pilar Guembe, with whom he has two children, Adrián and Paula. With Pilar, Guembe has written books on child education, such as Educar entre los dos (2017), Educar sin castigar (2013), Aprender de los hijos (2012) and No me ralles (2007). He was awarded the Premio de Ensayo Becerro de Bengoa in 2010, and the Premi de Filosofía Arnau de Vilanova in 2005.

== Works ==
- Educar entre los dos (2017)
- Educar sin castigar (2013)
- El filósofo impertinente (2013)
- Crecer en felicidad (2013)
- Aprender de los hijos (2012)
- Cuéntame un mito (2012)
- Cuéntame una historia (2011)
- Las narices de los filósofos (2008)
- Una de romanos (2007)
- No me ralles (2007)
