= William Delbert Gann =

American businessman (1878–1955)

- Born: June 6, 1878; Lufkin, Texas, US
- Died: June 18, 1955 (aged 77)
- Other name: WD Gann
- Occupation: Finance trader

William Delbert Gann (June 6, 1878 – June 18, 1955) or WD Gann, was a finance trader who developed securities trading technical analysis methods.

Gann's market forecasting methods are purportedly based on geometry, astronomy, astrology, time cycle analysis, and other esoteric means.

Opinions are sharply divided on the value, profitability, and relevance of his work.

== Career ==
Gann moved to New York City in 1903, working as a cotton broker in Texarkana before opening his brokerage firm, W.D. Gann & Company, in 1908.

By 1919, Gann launched The Supply and Demand Letter, a daily market newsletter with stock and commodity forecasts, followed by The Busy Man’s Service in 1923 for trading recommendations. His 1924 book, Truth of the Stock Tape, gained praise from The Wall Street Journal as his best work.

Gann often wrote in an esoteric and indirect style that many found difficult to follow; it was supposed that he could be doing so deliberately to conceal his true method.

In his private communication, Gann was much more direct and candid about his use of astrology. For example, in a private letter to a student, he openly demonstrated how he used planetary cycles to make predictions in the coffee market.

== Effectiveness ==
Alexander Elder, in his book Trading for a Living, said "I interviewed W.D. Gann's son, an analyst for a Boston bank. He told me that his famous father could not support his family by trading but earned his living by writing and selling instructional courses. When W.D. Gann died in the 1950s, his estate, including his house, was valued at slightly over $100,000." Larry Williams, in the book The Right Stock at the Right Time, also stated he met W.D Gann's son. Larry Williams stated that John Gann said "He asked why if his dad was as good as everyone said, the son was still smiling and dialing calling up customers to trade". Larry Williams in the same book says "I also met F.B Thatcher who had been Gann's promoter and advance man who said that Gann was just a good promoter, not necessarily a good stock trader".

== Bibliography ==
- Speculation A Profitable Profession (1910)
- Truth of The Stock Tape (1923)
- Tunnel Thru The Air (1927)
- Wall Street Stock Selector (1930)
- New Stock Trend Detector (1936)
- Face Facts America (1940)
- How to Make Profits in Commodities (1941)
- How to Make Profits Trading In Put And Call (1941)
- 45 Years in Wall Street (1949)
- The Magic Word (1950)
- WD Gann Economic Forecaster (1954)
