= Financial astrology =

Astrology for events in financial markets

Financial astrology (also known as business astrology, economic astrology, and/or astro-economics) is a pseudoscientific practice of relating the movements of celestial bodies to events in financial markets. The use of astrology in any context is not empirically based and its use in predicting financial markets is at plain odds with standard economic and financial theory.

As with astrology in general, predictions are vague and hard dates are rarely given. Critics have pointed out that some astrological events that have been used in predictions occur so rarely that they may have never happened before within a human lifetime, thus having no precedent on which to predict results.

== History ==
In 1992, 1994, and 2008, a magazine by the name of Wall Street Forecaster was named as one of the top forecasters on Wall Street, as the superstition was being leaned on for luck. It was also rated the second best performing forecaster in 2002. It was reported that some clients asked for their copies to be delivered in 'brown paper' to avoid mockery. As of 2001, the Astro fund trading company, which handled $3.5-5 million worth of investor assets, claimed 10-15% of fund managers were using their service or a similar company. The majority of the market demand for this service has come from the US and Japan respectively. In 2000, Bloomberg News was host to a weekly show dedicated to financial astrology. The 2000 financial crash led to a surge in companies and investment bankers using the services of financial astrologers.

== Criticism ==
Large financial firms tend to ignore financial astrology. The practice was used by Goldman Sachs in a paper released in 1999, focusing specifically on the correlation between eclipses and the state of the financial market at that time. Though floated as an idea by the company at the time, analysis showed that random data produced similar results.

== See also ==
- Calendar effect
