= 2011–12 Partick Thistle F.C. season =

Partick Thistle
2011–12 season
- Chairman: David Beattie
- Manager: Jackie McNamara
- Stadium: Firhill Stadium
- Scottish First Division: Sixth place
- Challenge Cup: Second round, lost to Hamilton Academical
- League Cup: First round, lost to Berwick Rangers
- Scottish Cup: Fourth round, lost to Queen of the South
- Top goalscorer: League: Kris Doolan (13); All: Paul Cairney (14)
- Highest home attendance: 3,380 vs. Greenock Morton, 30 September 2011
- Lowest home attendance: 1,439 vs. Ayr United, 21 February 2012
- Average home league attendance: 2,345
Home colours	Away colours

The 2011–12 season was Partick Thistle's sixth consecutive season in the Scottish First Division, having been promoted from the Scottish Second Division at the end of the 2005–06 season. Partick Thistle also competed in the Challenge Cup, League Cup and the Scottish Cup.

== Summary ==
Partick Thistle finished sixth in the First Division. They reached the second round of the Challenge Cup, the first round of the League Cup and the fourth round of the Scottish Cup.

== Results and fixtures ==
Win Draw Loss Postponed

=== Preseason ===
2 July 2011 Friendly	Blyth Spartans	2–0	Partick Thistle	Croft Park
	Vipond 53'; Cave 83'	PTFC Report		Attendance: 590; Referee: Stockbridge

9 July 2011 Friendly	Partick Thistle	1 – 1	Fleetwood Town	Firhill Stadium, Glasgow
	Stewart 52'	PTFC Report	Mangan 6'

13 July 2011 Friendly	Motherwell	1 – 0	Partick Thistle	Fir Park, Motherwell
	Craigan 2' (pen.)	Motherwell Report		Attendance: 2,122; Referee: Muir

16 July 2011 Friendly	Partick Thistle	2 – 1	Celtic XI	Firhill Stadium, Glasgow
	Cairney 14'; Stewart 56'	PTFC Report	Spence 20'	Attendance: 5,231

19 July 2011 Friendly	Dumbarton	4 – 1	Partick Thistle	Strathclyde Homes Stadium, Dumbarton
	Sutherland 27'; Agnew 68'; Scully 82'; Brennan 90'	PTFC Report	Burns 61' (pen.)	Referee: Conroy

=== Scottish First Division ===
6 August 2011 First Division	Partick Thistle	0 – 1	Dundee	Firhill Stadium, Glasgow
		BBC Sport	Lockwood 90' (pen.)	Attendance: 3,065; Referee: Conroy

13 August 2011 First Division	Falkirk	2 – 1	Partick Thistle	Falkirk Stadium, Falkirk
	El Alagui 8'; Higginbotham 50'	BBC Sport	Doolan 36'	Attendance: 3,036; Referee: Allan

20 August 2011 First Division	Partick Thistle	1 – 1	Hamilton Academical	Firhill Stadium, Glasgow
	Elliott 66'	BBC Sport	Mensing 76'	Attendance: 2,501; Referee: Brines

27 August 2011 First Division	Partick Thistle	2 – 1	Queen of the South	Firhill Stadium, Glasgow
	Doolan 20'; Elliott 85'	BBC Sport	Campbell 61'	Attendance: 2,045; Referee: McKendrick

10 September 2011 First Division	Ross County	2 – 2	Partick Thistle	Victoria Park, Dingwall
	Brittain 13' (pen.); Gardyne 47'; Miller (red card) 72'	BBC Sport	Cairney 73' (pen.); Erskine 89'	Attendance: 2,189; Referee: Allan

17 September 2011 First Division	Partick Thistle	4 – 0	Ayr United	Firhill Stadium, Glasgow
	Rowson 49'; Cairney 65'; Erskine 73'; Doolan 90' (pen.)	BBC Sport		Attendance: 2,639; Referee: O'Reilly

24 September 2011 First Division	Livingston	2 – 1	Partick Thistle	Almondvale Stadium, Livingston
	Deuchar 29'; Kyle Jacobs 90'	BBC Sport	Elliott 51'	Attendance: 2,251; Referee: Salmond

30 September 2011 First Division	Partick Thistle	5 – 0	Greenock Morton	Firhill Stadium, Glasgow
	O’Donnell 3'; Doolan 29'; Elliott 76'; Erskine 82'; Stewart 89'	BBC Sport	Graham (red card) 74'	Attendance: 3,380; Referee: Charleston

15 October 2011 First Division	Raith Rovers	2 – 0	Partick Thistle	Stark's Park, Kirkcaldy
	Ellis 31'; Baird 56'	BBC Sport		Attendance: 1,769; Referee: Muir

22 October 2011 First Division	Partick Thistle	2 – 2	Falkirk	Firhill Stadium, Glasgow
	Rowson 48'; Erskine 90'	BBC Sport	El Alagui 35'; Higginbotham 85'	Attendance: 2,851; Referee: Collum

29 October 2011 First Division	Dundee	0 – 1	Partick Thistle	Dens Park, Dundee
	Douglas (red card) 25'	PTFC Report	Cairney 26' (pen.)	Attendance: 4,263; Referee: McLean

5 November 2011 First Division	Partick Thistle	0 – 1	Ross County	Firhill Stadium, Glasgow
		BBC Sport	Vigurs 26'	Attendance: 2,472; Referee: Norris

12 November 2011 First Division	Queen of the South	0 – 0	Partick Thistle	Palmerston Park, Dumfries
		BBC Sport		Attendance: 1,728; Referee: Murray

26 November 2011 First Division	Ayr United	P – P	Partick Thistle	Somerset Park, Ayr

30 November 2011 First Division	Ayr United	0 – 0	Partick Thistle	Somerset Park, Ayr
		SFL Report		Attendance: 1,122; Referee: Colvin

3 December 2011 First Division	Partick Thistle	2 – 1	Ross County	Firhill Stadium, Glasgow
	Balatoni 26'; Deuchar 33' (o.g.)	SFL Report	Deuchar 56'	Attendance: 2,026; Referee: Muir

10 December 2011 First Division	Greenock Morton	1 – 2	Partick Thistle	Cappielow Park, Greenock
	McGeouch 53'	SFL Report	Rowson 39'; Doolan 88'	Attendance: 1,849; Referee: McKendrick

17 December 2011 First Division	Partick Thistle	0 – 1	Raith Rovers	Firhill Stadium, Glasgow
		SFL Report	Baird 66'	Attendance: 1,918; Referee: Tumilty

26 December 2011 First Division	Partick Thistle	1 – 0	Queen of the South	Firhill Stadium, Glasgow
	Doolan 48'	SFL Report		Attendance: 2,261; Referee: Madden

2 January 2012 First Division	Ross County	P – P	Partick Thistle	Victoria Park, Dingwall

13 January 2012 First Division	Hamilton Academical	1 – 0	Partick Thistle	New Douglas Park, Hamilton
	Spence 87'	BBC Sport	Archibald (red card) 90'	Attendance: 2,401; Referee: Tumilty

21 January 2012 First Division	Partick Thistle	0 – 0	Dundee	Firhill Stadium, Glasgow
		BBC Sport		Attendance: 2,425; Referee: McKendrick

28 January 2012 First Division	Partick Thistle	P – P	Ayr United	Firhill Stadium, Glasgow

11 February 2012 First Division	Livingston	3 – 1	Partick Thistle	Almondvale Stadium, Livingston
	McNulty 37'; Watson 45'; Jacobs 52'	SFL Report	Cairney 88'	Attendance: 1,824; Referee: Conroy

18 February 2012 First Division	Partick Thistle	0 – 0	Greenock Morton	Firhill Stadium, Glasgow
		SFL Report		Attendance: 2,305; Referee: Crawford

21 February 2012 First Division	Partick Thistle	4 – 2	Ayr United	Firhill Stadium, Glasgow
	Doolan 55', 64'; Cairney 81', 90'	SFL Report	Parker 4'; McGowan 88'	Attendance: 1,439; Referee: Murray

25 February 2012 First Division	Raith Rovers	2 – 1	Partick Thistle	Stark's Park, Kirkcaldy
	Graham 63'; Baird 72'	BBC Sport	Doolan 28'; Paton (red card) 68'	Attendance: 1,535; Referee: Clancy

3 March 2012 First Division	Partick Thistle	2 – 0	Hamilton Academical	Firhill Stadium, Glasgow
	Doolan 18'; Erskine 65'	PTFC Report		Attendance: 2,111; Referee: Finnie

6 March 2012 First Division	Ross County	3 – 0	Partick Thistle	Victoria Park, Dingwall
	McMenamin 30'; Vigurs 36'; Gardyne 50'	SFL Report		Attendance: 2,200; Referee: Brines

10 March 2012 First Division	Falkirk	1 – 1	Partick Thistle	Falkirk Stadium, Falkirk
	Millar 52' (pen.); Duffie (red card) 56'	SFL Report	Cairney 45'	Attendance: 3,257; Referee: Collum

17 March 2012 First Division	Queen of the South	0 – 5	Partick Thistle	Palmerston Park, Dumfries
		SFL Report	Doolan 17', 64'; O'Donnell 42'; Erskine 69'; Elliott 85'	Attendance: 1,689; Referee: Salmond

24 March 2012 First Division	Partick Thistle	0 – 1	Ross County	Firhill Stadium, Glasgow
		BBC Sport	McMenamin 44'	Attendance: 2,480; Referee: Beaton

31 March 2012 First Division	Partick Thistle	2 – 3	Livingston	Firhill Stadium, Glasgow
	Cairney 7'; Sinclair 54'	BBC Sport	Boulding 20', 47'; Russell 50'	Attendance: 1,871; Referee: Charleston

7 April 2012 First Division	Ayr United	1 – 3	Partick Thistle	Somerset Park, Ayr
	Dodd 79' (red card) 85'	BBC Sport	Erskine 27'; Doolan 33'; McGuigan 90'	Attendance: 1,761; Referee: Madden

10 April 2012 First Division	Greenock Morton	1 – 0	Partick Thistle	Cappielow Park, Greenock
	MacDonald 8'	SFL Report		Attendance: 1,637; Referee: McLean

14 April 2012 First Division	Partick Thistle	1 – 1	Raith Rovers	Firhill Stadium, Glasgow
	Welsh 64'	BBC Sport	Paton 74' (o.g.)	Attendance: 1,832; Referee: Murray

21 April 2012 First Division	Dundee	0 – 3	Partick Thistle	Dens Park, Dundee
	McGregor (red card) 90'	BBC Sport	Cairney 35', 81', 90' (pen.)	Attendance: 3,682; Referee: Clancy

28 April 2012 First Division	Partick Thistle	1 – 1	Falkirk	Firhill Stadium, Glasgow
	McGuigan 24'	SFL Report	Alston 71'	Attendance: 2,586; Referee: O'Reilly

5 May 2012 First Division	Hamilton Academical	2 – 2	Partick Thistle	New Douglas Park, Hamilton
	Redmond 26'; McShane 30'; McLaughlin (red card) 77'	BBC Sport	Bannigan 36'; Welsh 42'	Attendance: 1,978; Referee: McKendrick

=== Scottish Cup ===
19 November 2011 Scottish Cup round 3	Culter	1 – 1	Partick Thistle	Crombie Park, Peterculter
	Stopp 19'	BBC Sport	Cairney 6'	Attendance: 1,113; Referee: Roache

26 November 2011 Scottish Cup round 3 Replay	Partick Thistle	4 – 0	Culter	Firhill Stadium, Glasgow
	Elliott 1'; Cairney 26', 29'; Erskine 47'	BBC Sport		Attendance: 1,864; Referee: Roache

7 January 2012 Scottish Cup round 4	Partick Thistle	0 – 1	Queen of the South	Firhill Stadium, Glasgow
		BBC Sport	Carmichael 89'	Attendance: 2,454; Referee: Roache

=== Scottish League Cup ===
30 July 2011 Scottish League Cup round 1	Partick Thistle	1 – 3	Berwick Rangers	Firhill Stadium, Glasgow
	Cairney 28'; Paton (red card) 47'; Balatoni (red card) 79'	BBC Sport	Gray 33'; Noble 73'; P. Currie 79' (pen.) McDonald (yellow card) 81' (red card)	Attendance: 1,255; Referee: McLean

=== Scottish Challenge Cup ===
23 July 2011 Scottish Challenge Cup round 1	Partick Thistle	2 – 1	Stenhousemuir	Firhill Stadium, Glasgow
	Rowson 20'; Stewart 82'	BBC Sport	Kean 86'	Attendance: 1,292; Referee: Finnie

9 August 2011 Scottish Challenge Cup round 2	Hamilton Academical	1 – 0	Partick Thistle	New Douglas Park, Hamilton
	Chambers 86' (pen.)	BBC Sport		Attendance: 1,362; Referee: Thomson

== Player statistics ==
=== Captains ===
No.	P	Name	Country	No. games	Notes
	DF	Archibald	(Scotland)	36	Club captain

Last updated: 5 May 2012
Source: Competitive match reports.
Competitive matches only
Matches started as captain only
Country: FIFA nationality; No.: Squad number; P: Position; Name: Player name; No. Games: Number of games started as captain.

=== Squad ===
Last updated 5 May 2012

No.	Pos	Nat	Player	Total		Scottish First Division		Scottish Cup		League Cup		Challenge Cup	
No.	Pos	Nat	Player	Apps	Goals	Apps	Goals	Apps	Goals	Apps	Goals	Apps	Goals
	GK	(Scotland) SCO	Scott Fox	37	0	31+0	0	3+0	0	1+0	0	2+0	0
	GK	(Scotland) SCO	Ryan Scully	5	0	5+0	0	0+0	0	0+0	0	0+0	0
	DF	(Scotland) SCO	Alan Archibald	36	0	33+0	0	3+0	0	0+0	0	0+0	0
	DF	(Scotland) SCO	Jonathan Lindsay	2	0	0+1	0	0+0	0	0+0	0	1+0	0
	DF	(England) ENG	Conrad Balatoni	28	1	21+3	1	1+0	0	1+0	0	2+0	0
	DF	(Scotland) SCO	Gavin Griffin	2	0	0+2	0	0+0	0	0+0	0	0+0	0
	DF	(Scotland) SCO	Darren Cole	6	0	6+0	0	0+0	0	0+0	0	0+0	0
	DF	(Scotland) SCO	Aaron Sinclair	36	1	30+0	1	3+0	0	1+0	0	2+0	0
	DF	(Scotland) SCO	William Kinniburgh	7	0	4+1	0	0+0	0	1+0	0	1+0	0
	DF	(Scotland) SCO	Paul Paton	39	0	33+0	0	3+0	0	1+0	0	2+0	0
	DF	(Scotland) SCO	Stephen O’Donnell	33	2	28+3	2	2+0	0	0+0	0	0+0	0
	MF	(Scotland) SCO	Paul Cairney	40	14	35+0	10	3+0	3	1+0	1	1+0	0
	MF	(Scotland) SCO	Chris Erskine	41	7	23+12	6	3+0	1	1+0	0	2+0	0
	MF	(Scotland) SCO	Iain Flannigan	9	0	2+3	0	1+0	0	1+0	0	1+1	0
	MF	(Scotland) SCO	Kyle Hutton	12	0	12+0	0	0+0	0	0+0	0	0+0	0
	MF	(Scotland) SCO	Ryan MacBeth	0	0	0+0	0	0+0	0	0+0	0	0+0	0
	MF	(Northern Ireland) NIR	Caolan McAleer	1	0	0+1	0	0+0	0	0+0	0	0+0	0
	MF	(Scotland) SCO	Stuart Bannigan	18	1	9+5	1	1+1	0	0+1	0	1+0	0
	MF	(Scotland) SCO	David Rowson	35	4	29+1	3	2+0	0	1+0	0	2+0	1
	MF	(Scotland) SCO	Jamie Campbell	4	0	0+2	0	0+0	0	0+1	0	0+1	0
	MF	(Scotland) SCO	Scott Robertson	26	0	18+3	0	2+1	0	0+1	0	1+0	0
	MF	(Scotland) SCO	Sean Welsh	12	2	10+2	2	0+0	0	0+0	0	0+0	0
	MF	(Scotland) SCO	Bradley Halsman	1	0	1+0	0	0+0	0	0+0	0	0+0	0
	FW	(Scotland) SCO	Kris Doolan	40	13	28+6	13	2+1	0	1+0	0	1+1	0
	FW	(Northern Ireland) NIR	Thomas Stewart	27	2	8+13	1	3+0	0	1+0	0	2+0	1
	FW	(Scotland) SCO	Kieran Burns	5	0	1+4	0	0+0	0	0+0	0	0+0	0
	FW	(Scotland) SCO	Shaun Fraser	0	0	0+0	0	0+0	0	0+0	0	0+0	0
	FW	(England) ENG	Christie Elliott	32	6	18+11	5	1+2	1	0+0	0	0+0	0
	FW	(Scotland) SCO	Craig Dargo	7	0	3+1	0	0+3	0	0+0	0	0+0	0
	FW	(Scotland) SCO	Kal Naismith	8	0	4+4	0	0+0	0	0+0	0	0+0	0
	FW	(Scotland) SCO	Mark McGuigan	7	2	4+3	2	0+0	0	0+0	0	0+0	0

=== Disciplinary record ===
Includes all competitive matches.

Last updated 5 May 2012

Nation	Position	Name	Scottish First Division		Scottish Cup		League Cup		Challenge Cup		Total	
Nation	Position	Name	Booked	Sent off (straight red)	Booked	Sent off (straight red)	Booked	Sent off (straight red)	Booked	Sent off (straight red)	Booked	Sent off (straight red)
(Scotland)	GK	Craig Hinchliffe	0	0	0	0	0	0	0	0	0	0
(Scotland)	GK	Scott Fox	0	0	0	0	0	0	0	0	0	0
(Scotland)	GK	Ryan Scully	0	0	0	0	0	0	0	0	0	0
(Scotland)	DF	Alan Archibald	4	1	0	0	0	0	0	0	4	1
(England)	DF	Conrad Balatoni	5	0	0	0	0	1	0	0	5	1
(Scotland)	DF	Gavin Griffin	0	0	0	0	0	0	0	0	0	0
(Scotland)	DF	Darren Cole	1	0	0	0	0	0	0	0	1	0
(Scotland)	DF	William Kinniburgh	0	0	0	0	1	0	0	0	1	0
(Scotland)	DF	Jonathan Lindsay	0	0	0	0	0	0	0	0	0	0
(Scotland)	DF	Paul Paton	5	1	0	0	0	1	0	0	5	2
(Scotland)	DF	Aaron Sinclair	5	0	1	0	0	0	1	0	7	0
(Scotland)	DF	Stephen O’Donnell	2	0	0	0	0	0	0	0	2	0
(Scotland)	MF	Paul Cairney	6	0	0	0	1	0	1	0	8	0
(Scotland)	MF	Chris Erskine	1	0	0	0	0	0	0	0	1	0
(Scotland)	MF	Iain Flannigan	0	0	0	0	0	0	1	0	1	0
(Scotland)	MF	Kyle Hutton	2	0	0	0	0	0	0	0	2	0
(Scotland)	MF	Stuart Bannigan	2	0	0	0	0	0	0	0	2	0
(Scotland)	MF	Ryan MacBeth	0	0	0	0	0	0	0	0	0	0
(Northern Ireland)	MF	Caolan McAleer	0	0	0	0	0	0	0	0	0	0
(Scotland)	MF	David Rowson	1	0	0	0	0	0	1	0	2	0
(Scotland)	MF	Jamie Campbell	0	0	0	0	0	0	0	0	0	0
(Scotland)	MF	Scott Robertson	7	0	1	0	0	0	0	0	8	0
(Scotland)	MF	Sean Welsh	3	0	0	0	0	0	0	0	3	0
(Scotland)	MF	Bradley Halsman	0	0	0	0	0	0	0	0	0	0
(Scotland)	FW	Kris Doolan	0	0	0	0	0	0	0	0	0	0
(Scotland)	FW	Martin Grehan	0	0	0	0	0	0	0	0	0	0
(Northern Ireland)	FW	Thomas Stewart	0	0	0	0	0	0	0	0	0	0
(Scotland)	FW	Simon Donnelly	0	0	0	0	0	0	0	0	0	0
(Scotland)	FW	Kieran Burns	0	0	0	0	0	0	0	0	0	0
(Scotland)	FW	Shaun Fraser	0	0	0	0	0	0	0	0	0	0
(England)	FW	Christie Elliott	1	0	0	0	0	0	0	0	1	0
(Scotland)	FW	Craig Dargo	0	0	0	0	0	0	0	0	0	0
(Scotland)	FW	Kal Naismith	1	0	0	0	0	0	0	0	1	0
(Scotland)	FW	Mark McGuigan	1	0	0	0	0	0	0	0	1	0

=== Awards ===
Last updated 14 May 2012

Nation	Name	Award	Month
(Scotland)	Aaron Sinclair	Young Player of the Month	October
(Scotland)	Jackie McNamara	First Division Manager of the Month	December
(Scotland)	Paul Cairney	Player of the Month	April

== League table ==
Pos	Team	Pld	W	D	L	GF	GA	GD	Pts
4	Hamilton Academical	36	14	7	15	55	56	−1	49
5	Livingston	36	13	9	14	56	54	+2	48
6	Partick Thistle	36	12	11	13	50	39	+11	47
7	Raith Rovers	36	11	11	14	46	49	−3	44
8	Greenock Morton	36	10	12	14	40	55	−15	42

Source: SPFL Archive
Rules for classification: 1) points; 2) goal difference; 3) number of goals scored.

== Transfers ==
=== Players in ===
Player	From	Fee
(Scotland) Jonathan Lindsay	(Scotland) St Johnstone	Free
(Scotland) Aaron Sinclair	(Scotland) Montrose	Undisclosed
(England) Conrad Balatoni	(Scotland) Heart of Midlothian	Loan
(Scotland) Scott Robertson	(Iceland) Fram Reykjavík	Free
(England) Christie Elliott	(England) Whitley Bay	Free
(Scotland) Stephen O’Donnell	(Scotland) Celtic	Free
(Scotland) Kyle Hutton	(Scotland) Rangers	Loan
(Scotland) Jordan Moffat	(Scotland) Celtic	Free
(Scotland) Dale Keenan	(Scotland) Celtic	Free
(Scotland) Bradley Halsman	(Scotland) Motherwell	Free
(Scotland) Gavin Griffin	(Scotland) Motherwell	Free
(Scotland) Craig Dargo	(Scotland) St Mirren	Free
(Scotland) James Wightman	(Scotland) Celtic	Free
(Scotland) Aaron Sekhon	(Scotland) Falkirk	Free
(Scotland) Darren Cole	(Scotland) Rangers	Loan
(Scotland) Kal Naismith	(Scotland) Rangers	Loan
(Scotland) Sean Welsh	(Scotland) Hibernian	Loan
(England) Conrad Balatoni	(Scotland) Heart of Midlothian	Free
(Northern Ireland) Caolan McAleer	(Northern Ireland) Linfield	Free
(Scotland) Mark McGuigan	(Scotland) Abertay University	Free

=== Players out ===
Player	To	Fee
(Scotland) Patrick Boyle	(Scotland) Dunfermline Athletic	Free
(Scotland) John Robertson	(Scotland) Ayr United	Free
(Scotland) Graeme Shepherd	Free agent	Free
(Scotland) Ross McGeough	(Scotland) Petershill	Free
(England) Bryn Halliwell	(Scotland) Sauchie	Free
(Scotland) Shaun Fraser	(Scotland) Stenhousemuir	Loan
(Scotland) Kieran Burns	(Scotland) Clydebank	Loan
(Scotland) Kyle Lochead	(Scotland) Kirkintilloch Rob Roy	Free
(Scotland) Martin Grehan	(Scotland) Stranraer	Free
(Scotland) Bryan Hodge	(Scotland) Brechin City	Free
(Scotland) Iain Flannigan	(Scotland) Greenock Morton	Free
(Scotland) Jonathan Lindsay	(Scotland) Brechin City	Loan
(Scotland) Craig Dargo	(Scotland) Dumbarton	Free
(Scotland) Ryan MacBeth	Free agent	Free
