= 2009–10 Partick Thistle F.C. season =

Partick Thistle
2009–10 season
- Chairman: Allan Cowan
- Manager: Ian McCall
- Scottish Cup: 4th Round
- League Cup: 2nd Round
- Challenge Cup: Quarter final

During the 2009–10 season, Partick Thistle participated in the Scottish First Division, having finished in 2nd place the previous season.

== Team kit ==
The team kit for the 2009–10 season will be produced by Puma in partnership with Greaves Sports and the main shirt sponsor will be Ignis Asset Management as per season 2008–09. The home kit will be the same as season 2008–09 and the away is a silver, black & pink camouflage design with black sleeves. A Centenary top was also announced to mark Thistle's 100th year at Firhill Stadium, to be worn against Dunfermline Athletic in the league match closest to the first ever game at the ground.

Home colours	Away colours

== Notable events ==
Season 2009–10 marks the Centenary of Partick Thistle at Firhill Stadium. A Centenary Top (in the club's original navy blue) is to be released by their official partners Greaves Sports and the club also set up a Centenary Fundraiser with the slogan "£100k for 100 Years".

With 2009 also being Alan Archibald's Testimonial Year, several functions were held and a Testimonial Match against a Liverpool XI played. This game took place on Tuesday 11 August, the match ending in a 1–1 draw.

Having been with the Club in a playing capacity until the end of season 2008–09, Simon Donnelly returned in a player-coach role following the departure of John Henry, First Team Coach, to Burnley F.C.

== Squad ==
Note: Flags indicate national team as defined under FIFA eligibility rules; some limited exceptions apply. Players may hold more than one non-FIFA nationality.

No.	Pos.	Nation	Player
—	GK	NIR	Jonathan Tuffey
—	GK	SCO	Craig Hinchliffe
—	DF	SCO	Alan Archibald
—	DF	SCO	Patrick Boyle
—	DF	SCO	Martyn Corrigan
—	DF	SCO	William Kinniburgh
—	DF	SCO	Ricky Little (on loan at Queen's Park)
—	DF	SCO	Ian Maxwell
—	DF	SCO	Paul Paton
—	DF	SCO	John Robertson
—	MF	SCO	Jamie Adams (on loan from Kilmarnock)

No.	Pos.	Nation	Player
—	MF	SCO	Paul Cairney
—	MF	SCO	Mark Corcoran
—	MF	SCO	Chris Erskine
—	MF	SCO	Bryan Hodge
—	MF	SCO	Stephen McKeown
—	MF	SCO	David Rowson
—	FW	SCO	Simon Donnelly
—	FW	SCO	Liam Buchanan
—	FW	SCO	Kris Doolan
—	FW	SCO	Jim Hamilton
—	FW	ENG	Steve Lovell

=== Youth Squad ===
Note: Flags indicate national team as defined under FIFA eligibility rules; some limited exceptions apply. Players may hold more than one non-FIFA nationality.

No.	Pos.	Nation	Player
—	GK	SCO	Ryan Scully
—	GK	SCO	Graeme Shepherd
—	DF	SCO	Kyle Lochhead
—	DF	SCO	Ross McGeough
—	DF	SCO	Colin Stevenson

No.	Pos.	Nation	Player
—	MF	SCO	Stuart Bannigan
—	MF	SCO	Jamie Campbell
—	MF	SCO	Ryan MacBeth
—	FW	SCO	Kieran Burns
—	FW	SCO	Philip Middlemiss

== Match results ==
=== Friendlies ===
Date	Opponent	Venue	Score	Scorers	Attendance
11 July 2009	Stirling Albion	Forthbank Stadium	1-1	Cairney (pen.)	604
14 July 2009	Dumbarton	Strathclyde Homes Stadium	2-0	Robertson, Doolan	
18 July 2009	Clyde	Broadwood Stadium	1-2	Doolan	
29 July 2009	Kilmarnock	Rugby Park	3-2	Donnelly (2), Doolan	1,832
11 August 2009	Liverpool XI†	Firhill Stadium	1-1	Erskine	2,529

† Alan Archibald's Testimonial

=== Scottish First Division ===
Date	Opponent	Venue	Score	Scorers	Attendance
8 August	Ayr United	Somerset Park	1-1	Donnelly	3,078
15 August	Ross County	Firhill Stadium	0-0		2,391
22 August	Queen of the South	Palmerston Park	0-1		2,915
29 August	Greenock Morton	Firhill Stadium	5-0	Buchanan (2), Corcoran (2), Cairney	2,986
12 September	Raith Rovers	Stark's Park	1-1	Doolan	2,387
19 September	Dunfermline Athletic	Firhill Stadium	2-0	Cairney, Donnelly	3,263
26 September	Inverness CT	Caledonian Stadium	3-2	Buchanan (2), Archibald	3,218
3 October	Airdrie Utd	Firhill Stadium	2-0	Hodge, Donnelly	2,839
10 October	Dundee	Dens Park	0-2		5,364
17 October	Ayr United	Firhill Stadium	2-0	Corcoran, Buchanan	3,055
24 October	Ross County	Victoria Park	2-2	Erskine, Buchanan	2,369
31 October	Raith Rovers	Firhill Stadium	1-2	Donnelly	3,084
7 November	Greenock Morton	Cappielow	2-0	Buchanan, Donnelly	2,738
14 November	Dunfermline Athletic	East End Park	1-3	Cairney	3,111
21 November	Inverness CT	Firhill Stadium	2-1	Adams, Lovell	2,353
5 December	Dundee	Firhill Stadium	0-2		4,453
12 December	Airdrie Utd	Excelsior Stadium	5-2	Donnelly, McKeown, Lovell (2), Cairney	1,321
26 December	Queen of the South	Firhill Stadium	2-2	Paton, Adams	2,766
4 January	Greenock Morton	Firhill Stadium	1-0	Cairney	2,192
16 January	Raith Rovers	Stark's Park	0-1		1,951
23 January	Dunfermline Athletic	Firhill Stadium	1-4	Buchanan	2,607
30 January	Inverness CT	Caledonian Stadium	1-2	Corcoran	3,107
13 February	Airdrie Utd	Firhill Stadium	2-0	Cairney (2)	2,404
20 February	Dundee	Dens Park	0-1		5,216
27 February	Ross County	Firhill Stadium	2-1	Buchanan, Hodge	2,192
6 March	Queen of the South	Palmerston Park	0-1		2,674
10 March	Ayr United	Somerset Park	0-1		1,505
20 March	Greenock Morton	Cappielow Park	0-1		2,163
23 March	Dunfermline Athletic	East End Park	2-1	Buchanan, Donnelly	2,401
27 March	Inverness CT	Firhill Stadium	0-1		2,380
3 April	Airdrie United	Excelsior Stadium	0-2		1,142
10 April	Dundee	Firhill Stadium	0-1		2,545
17 April	Ayr United	Firhill Stadium	0-1		1,877
19 April	Raith Rovers	Firhill Stadium	0-0		1,151
24 April	Ross County	Victoria Park	2-1	Donnelly, Grehan	2,175
1 May	Queen of the South	Firhill Stadium	1-0	Doolan	2,912

=== Scottish Cup ===
Round	Date	Opponent	Venue	Score	Scorers	Attendance
4	9 January 2010	Dundee United	Firhill	0-2		4,002

=== League Cup ===
Round	Date	Opponent	Venue	Score	Scorers	Attendance
1	1 August 2009	Berwick Rangers	Firhill	5-1	Hodge, Buchanan (2), Erskine (2)	1,472
2	25 August 2009	Queen of the South	Firhill	1-2	Donnelly	1,527

=== Challenge Cup ===
Round	Date	Opponent	Venue	Score	Scorers	Attendance
1	25 July 2009	Airdrie United	New Broomfield	1-0	Buchanan	1,325
2	19 August 2009	Forfar Athletic	Station Park	6-1	Doolan, Hamilton (2), Rowson, Donnelly, Cairney	532
Quarter-Final	6 September 2009	Inverness CT	Firhill Stadium	1-1 (ICT won 4-3 on pens)	Buchanan	1,746

== Player statistics ==
=== League Appearances ===
Player	Apps (Sub Apps)		Yellow card	Red card
(Scotland) Jamie Adams (loan Killie)	4 (1)	1	2	0
(Scotland) Alan Archibald	15 (0)	1	4	0
(Scotland) Patrick Boyle	1 (1)	0	0	0
(Scotland) Liam Buchanan	10 (1)	7	1	1
(Scotland) Paul Cairney	17 (0)	4	1	0
(Scotland) Martyn Corrigan	2 (2)	0	0	0
(Scotland) Mark Corcoran	14 (3)	3	0	0
(Scotland) Simon Donnelly	15 (2)	6	1	0
(Scotland) Kris Doolan	2 (9)	1	0	0
(Scotland) Chris Erskine	6 (11)	1	1	0
(Scotland) Jim Hamilton	2 (7)	0	2	0
(Scotland) Craig Hinchliffe	1 (0)	0	0	0
(Scotland) Bryan Hodge	10 (5)	1	0	0
(Scotland) Willie Kinniburgh	1 (1)	0	0	0
(Scotland) Ricky Little	0 (0)	0	0	0
(England) Steve Lovell	3 (2)	3	0	0
(Scotland) Ian Maxwell	17 (0)	0	3	0
(Scotland) Stephen McKeown	4 (2)	1	0	1
(Scotland) Paul Paton	15 (0)	0	5	0
(Scotland) John Robertson	15 (1)	0	1	0
(Scotland) David Rowson	17 (0)	0	1	0
(Northern Ireland) Jonathan Tuffey	16 (0)	0	0	0

=== Cup Appearances ===
Player	Scottish Cup				League Cup				Challenge Cup			
Player	Apps		Yellow card	Red card	Apps		Yellow card	Red card	Apps		Yellow card	Red card
(Scotland) Alan Archibald	0	0	0	0	1	0	0	0	3	0	1	0
(Scotland) Patrick Boyle	0	0	0	0	1	0	0	0	3	0	0	0
(Scotland) Liam Buchanan	0	0	0	0	2	2	0	0	2	2	1	0
(Scotland) Paul Cairney	0	0	0	0	2	0	0	0	3	1	2	0
(Scotland) Mark Corcoran	0	0	0	0	2	0	0	0	2	0	0	0
(Scotland) Martyn Corrigan	0	0	0	0	2	0	0	0	0	0	0	0
(Scotland) Simon Donnelly	0	0	0	0	2	1	0	0	2	1	0	0
(Scotland) Kris Doolan	0	0	0	0	0	0	0	0	2	1	0	0
(Scotland) Chris Erskine	0	0	0	0	2	2	0	0	3	0	0	0
(Scotland) Jim Hamilton	0	0	0	0	2	0	0	0	3	2	0	0
(Scotland) Craig Hinchliffe	0	0	0	0	0	0	0	0	1	0	0	0
(Scotland) Bryan Hodge	0	0	0	0	1	1	0	0	3	0	0	0
(Scotland) Willy Kinniburgh	0	0	0	0	0	0	0	0	1	0	0	0
(Scotland) Ricky Little	0	0	0	0	0	0	0	0	0	0	0	0
(Scotland) Ian Maxwell	0	0	0	0	1	0	0	0	2	0	0	0
(Scotland) Stephen McKeown	0	0	0	0	2	0	0	0	1	0	0	0
(Scotland) Paul Paton	0	0	0	0	2	0	1	0	3	0	0	0
(Scotland) John Robertson	0	0	0	0	2	0	0	0	3	0	0	0
(Scotland) David Rowson	0	0	0	0	2	0	0	0	3	1	0	0
(Northern Ireland) Jonathan Tuffey	0	0	0	0	2	0	0	0	2	0	0	0

=== Scorers ===
P	Player	League	Scottish Cup	League Cup	Challenge Cup	Total
1	Liam Buchanan	7	0	2	2	11
2	Simon Donnelly	6	0	1	1	8
3	Paul Cairney	4	0	0	1	5
4	Mark Corcoran	3	0	0	0	3
5	Steve Lovell	3	0	0	0	3
6	Chris Erskine	1	0	2	0	3
7	Jim Hamilton	0	0	0	2	2
8	Kris Doolan	1	0	0	1	2
9	Bryan Hodge	1	0	1	0	2
10	Alan Archibald	1	0	0	0	1
11	Jamie Adams	1	0	0	0	1
12	Stephen McKeown	1	0	0	0	1
13	David Rowson	0	0	0	1	1

== League table ==
Pos	Team	Pld	W	D	L	GF	GA	GD	Pts
4	Queen of the South	36	15	11	10	53	40	+13	56
5	Ross County	36	15	11	10	46	44	+2	56
6	Partick Thistle	36	14	6	16	43	40	+3	48
7	Raith Rovers	36	11	9	16	36	47	−11	42
8	Greenock Morton	36	11	4	21	40	65	−25	37

Source: Scottish Football League
Rules for classification: 1) points; 2) goal difference; 3) number of goals scored.
First Division play-offs: The 9th place team will be entered into a play-off with the 2nd, 3rd and 4th places of the Second Division. The winner gets a place in the 2010-11 First Division
