= 2010–11 Partick Thistle F.C. season =

Partick Thistle
2010–11 season
- Chairman: David Beattie
- Manager: Ian McCall; Jackie McNamara
- Stadium: Firhill Stadium
- Scottish First Division: Fifth place
- Challenge Cup: Semi-final, lost to Ross County
- League Cup: Second round, lost to Falkirk
- Scottish Cup: Fifth round, lost to St Johnstone
- Top goalscorer: League: Doolan (16); All: Doolan (20)
- Highest home attendance: 2,801vs. Dundee, 14 August 2010
- Lowest home attendance: 1,001vs. Queen of the South, 8 March 2011
- Average home league attendance: 2,024
Home colours	Away colours

The 2010–11 season was Partick Thistle's fifth consecutive season in the Scottish First Division, having been promoted from the Scottish Second Division at the end of the 2005–06 season. Partick Thistle also competed in the Challenge Cup, League Cup and the Scottish Cup.

== Summary ==
Partick Thistle finished fifth in the First Division. They reached the Semi-final of the Scottish Challenge Cup, the second round of the League Cup and the fifth round of the Scottish Cup.

=== Management ===
Thistle began the 2010–11 season under the management of Ian McCall. On 15 April 2011, McCall resigned as manager, with defender Jackie McNamara being appointed as caretaker manager. McNamara was appointed on a permanent basis at the end of the season, on a rolling one-year contract.

== Results and fixtures ==
Win Draw Loss

=== Scottish First Division ===
7 August 2010 First Division	Raith Rovers F.C.	4–0	Partick Thistle F.C.	Stark's Park
	Ferry 7'; Baird 31', 42' (pen.), 82'	Club Report	Kinniburgh (red card)	Attendance: 2,238; Referee: Euan Norris

14 August 2010 First Division	Partick Thistle F.C.	1–0	Dundee F.C.	Firhill Stadium
	Boyle 71'	Club Report		Attendance: 2,801; Referee: Frank McDermott

21 August 2010 First Division	Morton F.C.	2–0	Partick Thistle F.C.	Cappielow Park
	Kean 18'; Tidser 87'	Club Report		Referee: Brian Winter

28 August 2010 First Division	Cowdenbeath F.C.	2–1	Partick Thistle F.C.	Central Park
	Fairbairn 17'; Armstrong 53'	Club Report	Doolan 16'	Attendance: 881; Referee: Steven McLean

11 September 2010 First Division	Partick Thistle F.C.	1–2	Stirling Albion F.C.	Firhill Stadium
	Doolan 50'	SFL Report	Gibson 54'; Smith 75'	Attendance: 1,994; Referee: George Salmond

18 September 2010 First Division	Queen of the South F.C.	2–1	Partick Thistle F.C.	Palmerston Park
	Johnston 75'; Quinn 87'	Club Report	Flannigan 33'	Referee: Stephen Finnie

25 September 2010 First Division	Partick Thistle F.C.	0–2	Dunfermline F.C.	Firhill Stadium
		club Report	Clarke 29'; Kirk 71'	Attendance: 2,188; Referee: Bobby Madden

2 October 2010 First Division	Ross County F.C.	0–2	Partick Thistle F.C.	Victoria Park
		Club Report	Boyle 13'; Erskine 83'	Attendance: 2,263; Referee: David Somers

16 October 2010 First Division	Partick Thistle F.C.	1–0	Falkirk F.C.	Firhill Stadium
	Paton 16'	Club Report		Attendance: 2,783; Referee: David Somers

23 October 2010 First Division	Stirling Albion F.C.	4–2	Partick Thistle F.C.	Forthbank Stadium
	Smith 2', 27'; Aitken 30', 65'	club Report	Doolan 14', 78'	Referee: Crawford Allan

30 October 2010 First Division	Partick Thistle F.C.	1–0	Cowdenbeath F.C.	Firhill Stadium
	Buchanan 53'	Club Report		Attendance: 1,841; Referee: Craig Charleston

6 November 2010 First Division	Dundee F.C.	2–1	Partick Thistle F.C.	Dens Park
	Griffiths 13'; Adams 84'	Club Report	Hodge 57'	Attendance: 6,022; Referee: Charlie Richmond

13 November 2010 First Division	Partick Thistle F.C.	0–0	Morton F.C.	Firhill Stadium
		Club Report		Attendance: 2,536; Referee: Brian Winter

11 December 2010 First Division	Partick Thistle F.C.	1–1	Ross County F.C.	Firhill Stadium
	Erskine 40'	club Report	Brittain 18' (pen.)	Attendance: 1,509; Referee: Steve Conroy

14 December 2010 First Division	Dunfermline F.C.	0–0	Partick Thistle F.C.	East End Park
		Club Report		Attendance: 1,743; Referee: Craig Thomson

26 December 2010 First Division	Partick Thistle F.C.	0–0	Raith Rovers F.C.	Firhill Stadium
		Club Report		Attendance: 2,036; Referee: George Salmond

15 January 2011 First Division	Partick Thistle F.C.	6–1	Stirling Albion F.C.	Firhill Stadium
	Doolan 23'; Flannigan 34'; Buchanan 50' (pen.), 67'; Fraser 74'; Campbell 82'	Club Report	Aitken 90'	Attendance: 1,749; Referee: Stephen Finnie

29 January 2011 First Division	Partick Thistle F.C.	2–0	Dunfermline F.C.	Firhill Stadium
	Erskine 13'; Doolan 41'	Club Report		Attendance: 2,720; Referee: Alan Muir

12 February 2011 First Division	Queen of the South F.C.	3–3	Partick Thistle F.C.	Palmerston Park
	McLaren 43', 87'; Johnston 90'	Club Report	Grehan 33'; Doolan 40'; Flannigan 82'	Attendance: 1,860; Referee: Crawford Allan

15 February 2011 First Division	Cowdenbeath F.C.	1–1	Partick Thistle F.C.	Central Park
	Campbell 8' (pen.)	Club Report	Flannigan 85'	Attendance: 411; Referee: Craig Charleston

22 February 2011 First Division	Morton F.C.	1–0	Partick Thistle F.C.	Cappielow Park
	Lyle 15' (pen.)	Club Report		Attendance: 1,267; Referee: Steven Nicholls

26 February 2011 First Division	Ross County F.C.	0–0	Partick Thistle F.C.	Victoria Park
		Club Report		Attendance: 2,316; Referee: John McKendrick

5 March 2011 First Division	Partick Thistle F.C.	0–0	Dundee F.C.	Firhill Stadium
		Club Report		Attendance: 2,671; Referee: Bobby Madden

8 March 2011 First Division	Partick Thistle F.C.	3–1	Queen of the South F.C.	Firhill Stadium
	Doolan 34'; Erskine 84'; Fraser 87'	SFL Report	Carmichael 86'	Attendance: 1,001; Referee: Thomas Robertson

12 March 2011 First Division	Raith Rovers F.C.	0–2	Partick Thistle F.C.	Stark's Park
		Club Report	Kris Doolan 49'; Boyle 90'	Referee: Frank McDermott

19 March 2011 First Division	Partick Thistle F.C.	0–1	Cowdenbeath F.C.	Firhill Stadium
		Club Report	Stewart 50'	Attendance: 1,754; Referee: Steven McLean

22 March 2011 First Division	Stirling Albion F.C.	0–3	Partick Thistle F.C.	Forthbank Stadium
		Club Report	Kris Doolan 27', 73' (pen.); Balatoni 36'	Referee: George Salmond

26 March 2011 First Division	Dunfermline F.C.	0–0	Partick Thistle F.C.	East End Park
		Club Report		Attendance: 3,019; Referee: Charlie Richmond

2 April 2011 First Division	Partick Thistle F.C.	0– 0	Queen of the South F.C.	Firhill Stadium
		BBC SPORT		Attendance: 1,806; Referee: Crawford Allan

9 April 2011 First Division	Falkirk F.C.	2– 3	Partick Thistle F.C.	Falkirk Stadium
	McManus 66'; Finnigan 85'	BBC SPORT	Erskine 8', 24'; Doolan 62'	Attendance: 3,735; Referee: Iain Brines

12 April 2011 First Division	Partick Thistle F.C.	1– 2	Falkirk F.C.	Firhill Stadium
	Kinniburgh 90'	BBC SPORT	Alston 64'; Finnigan 67'	Attendance: 1,142; Referee: Charlie Richmond

16 April 2011 First Division	Partick Thistle F.C.	1– 1	Ross County F.C.	Firhill Stadium
	Doolan 4' (pen.)	BBC SPORT	Lawson 37'	Attendance: 1,714; Referee: Brian Colvin

19 April 2011 First Division	Falkirk F.C.	2– 0	Partick Thistle F.C.	Falkirk Stadium
	McManus 45'; Stewart 90'	BBC SPORT		Attendance: 3,439; Referee: Mat Northcroft

23 April 2011 First Division	Partick Thistle F.C.	2– 0	Morton F.C.	Firhill Stadium
	Erskine 60'; Boyle 72'	BBC SPORT		Attendance: 2,060; Referee: David Somers

30 April 2011 First Division	Dundee F.C.	3– 2	Partick Thistle F.C.	Dens Park
	Forsyth 59', 62'; Lockwood 71' (pen.)	BBC SPORT	Stewart 68'; Doolan 90'	Attendance: 7,746; Referee: Bobby Madden

7 May 2011 First Division	Partick Thistle F.C.	3– 0	Raith Rovers F.C.	Firhill Stadium
	Stewart 50'; Doolan 78' (pen.); Rowson 90'	BBC SPORT		Attendance: 2,279; Referee: Eddie Smith

=== Scottish Challenge Cup ===
24 July 2010 Challenge Cup round 1	Partick Thistle F.C.	2–1	Clyde F.C.	Firhill Stadium
	Buchanan 12'; MacBeth 71'	SFL Report	Strachan 31'	Attendance: 1,759; Referee: Steven Nicholls

10 August 2010 Challenge Cup round 2	Partick Thistle F.C.	2–1	Berwick Rangers F.C.	Firhill Stadium
	Cairney 40'; Rowson 80'	SFL Report	Andy McLean 28'	Attendance: 931; Referee: Anthony Law

4 September 2010 Challenge Cup QF	Partick Thistle F.C.	2–1	Ayr United F.C.	Firhill Stadium
	Doolan 2', 33'	SFL Report	Rodgers 36'	Attendance: 1,831; Referee: Stevie O'Reilly

10 October 2010 Challenge Cup SF	Ross County F.C.	2–2 Ross County win 4-3 on penalties	Partick Thistle F.C.	Victoria Park
	Morrison 54'; Barrowman 88'	SFL Report	Kinniburgh 8'; Boyle 63'	Attendance: 1,307; Referee: Steve Conroy

=== Scottish League Cup ===
31 July 2010 League Cup round 1	Annan Athletic F.C.	0–1	Partick Thistle F.C.	Galabank
		BBC SPORT	Donnelly 84'	Attendance: 1,025; Referee: Charlie Richmond

24 August 2010 League Cup round 2	Partick Thistle F.C.	0–1	Falkirk F.C.	Firhill Stadium
		BBC SPORT	Flynn 58'	Attendance: 1,619; Referee: Charlie Richmond

=== Scottish Cup ===
20 November 2010 Scottish Cup round 3	Stirling Albion F.C.	1–3	Partick Thistle F.C.	Forthbank Stadium
	Smith 73'	Club Report	Cairney 58'; Donnelly 86'; Grehan 90'	Attendance: 1,146; Referee: Anthony Law

11 January 2011 Scottish Cup round 4	Falkirk F.C.	2–2	Partick Thistle F.C.	Falkirk Stadium
	Millar 37'; Compton 72'	Club Report	Buchanan 7'; Doolan 85'	Attendance: 2,039; Referee: Brian Winter

18 January 2011 Scottish Cup round 4 replay	Partick Thistle F.C.	1–0	Falkirk F.C.	Firhill Stadium
	Erskine 6'	BBC SPORT		Attendance: 2,024; Referee: Brian Winter

9 February 2011 Scottish Cup round 5	St Johnstone F.C.	2–0	Partick Thistle F.C.	McDiarmid Park
	Davidson 42'; Craig 57'	Club Report		Attendance: 2,441; Referee: Iain Brines

== Squad ==
Note: Flags indicate national team as defined under FIFA eligibility rules; some limited exceptions apply. Players may hold more than one non-FIFA nationality.

No.	Pos.	Nation	Player
—	GK	ENG	Bryn Halliwell
—	GK	SCO	Craig Hinchliffe
—	GK	SCO	Scott Fox
—	DF	SCO	Alan Archibald
—	DF	SCO	Patrick Boyle
—	DF	SCO	William Kinniburgh
—	DF	SCO	Ian Maxwell
—	DF	AUS	Ryan McGowan (on loan from Heart of Midlothian)
—	DF	ENG	Conrad Balatoni (on loan from Heart of Midlothian)
—	DF	SCO	Paul Paton
—	DF	SCO	John Robertson
—	MF	SCO	Paul Cairney
—	MF	SCO	Simon Donnelly

No.	Pos.	Nation	Player
—	MF	SCO	Chris Erskine
—	MF	SCO	Sean Wright
—	MF	SCO	Bryan Hodge
—	MF	SCO	Ryan MacBeth
—	MF	SCO	Jackie McNamara
—	MF	SCO	David Rowson
—	MF	SCO	Iain Flannigan
—	MF	SCO	Jamie Campbell
—	FW	SCO	Kris Doolan
—	FW	SCO	Martin Grehan
—	FW	NIR	Tommy Stewart

== League table ==
Pos	Team	Pld	W	D	L	GF	GA	GD	Pts
3	Falkirk	36	17	7	12	57	41	+16	58
4	Queen of the South	36	14	7	15	54	53	+1	49
5	Partick Thistle	36	12	11	13	44	39	+5	47
6	Dundee	36	19	12	5	54	34	+20	44 (Note: Dundee were docked 25 points for entering administration. The deduction was temporarily lifted pending an appeal by the club, however the appeal failed and the deduction was reinstated.)
7	Greenock Morton	36	11	10	15	39	43	−4	43

Source: SPFL
Rules for classification: 1) points; 2) goal difference; 3) number of goals scored.
