= Ryan Scully =

Irish professional footballer (born 1992)

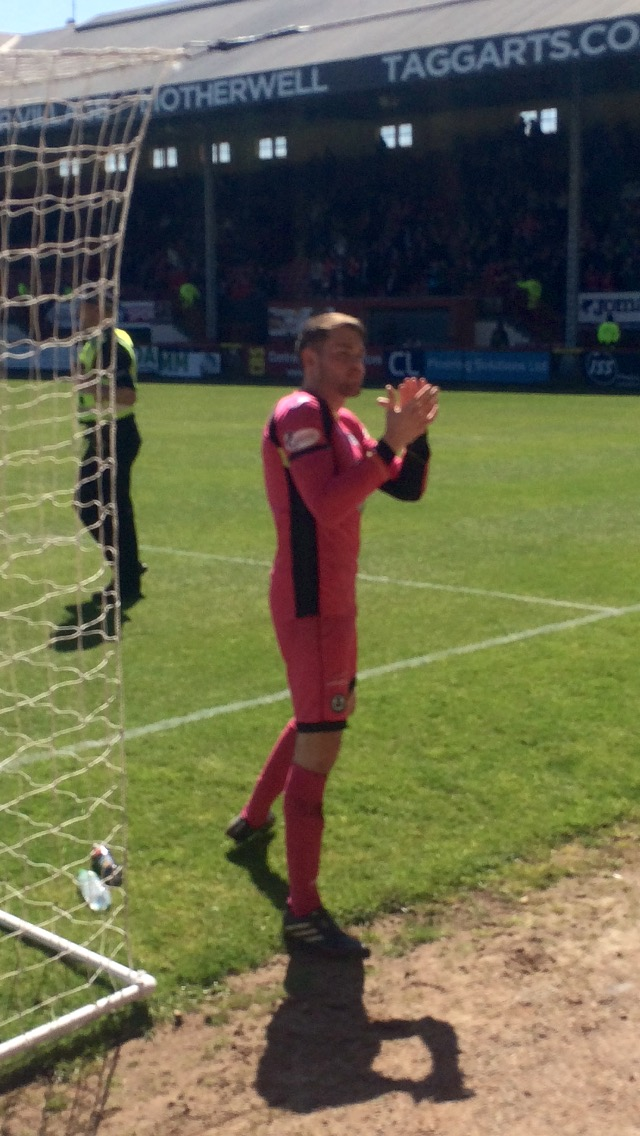

Personal information
- Date of birth: 29 October 1992 (age 34)
- Place of birth: Dublin, Ireland
- Height: 1.85 m (6 ft 1 in)
- Position: Goalkeeper

Youth career
- 2008–2009: Partick Thistle

Senior career*
Years	Team	Apps	(Gls)
2008–2018	Partick Thistle	30	(0)
2009–2010	→ Petershill (loan)		
2013	→ Albion Rovers (loan)	6	(0)
2013–2014	→ Dunfermline Athletic (loan)	34	(0)
2014–2015	→ Dunfermline Athletic (loan)	34	(0)
2018–2019	Greenock Morton	12	(0)
2019–2020	Dunfermline Athletic	26	(0)
2020–2021	Hamilton Academical	0	(0)
2022	Hamilton Academical	0	(0)
2022-	Drumchapel United	?	(?)
- * Club domestic league appearances and goals as of 17:03, 7 January 2025 (UTC)

Ryan Scully (born 29 October 1992) is an Irish professional footballer who played as a goalkeeper for Drumchapel United

Scully played for Drumchapel United, Partick Thistle, Greenock Morton, Dunfermline Athletic and Hamilton Academical, as well as Petershill and Albion Rovers on loan.

== Career ==
=== Partick Thistle ===
Scully joined Partick Thistle in 2008 and began playing for their under-17 squad. Before arriving at Firhill he had received no formal coaching.

Having been with Thistle for a year and a half Scully went on loan to West of Scotland Super League side Petershill for four weeks in 2009 to gain more first team experience.

In May 2010 he was part of the under–19 side who won the SFL Youth Cup. Thistle defeated Livingston 3–2 in the final with Scully making numerous saves. At the conclusion of the 2009–10 season, Scully, along with Ross McGeough and Ryan MacBeth, was promoted to the first team squad. Scully signed a new contract in September 2010 which would keep him with Thistle until May 2013.

During the 2010–11 season he appeared on the bench on several occasions before suffering a setback by dislocating a thumb ruling him out for number of weeks. After his recovery he made his senior début in the final game of the season on 7 May 2011 in a 3–0 victory against Raith Rovers in a Scottish First Division fixture where he kept a clean sheet.

Scully featured in pre-season friendly matches in advance of the 2011–12 season, the final of which was against Dumbarton in a 4–1 defeat. He made his first appearance of the season on his nineteenth birthday keeping another clean sheet against ten-man Dundee. After Scully's impressive displays his manager Jackie McNamara admitted to having a selection dilemma with first choice keeper Scott Fox fit again following a virus. Ultimately Scully was chosen in goal for the following match against league leaders Ross County, however the match ended in 1–0 defeat for Thistle with Scully conceding his first ever competitive goal. He lost his place in the team for the ensuing match having been ruled out after incurring a concussion in training from a boot to the head. Having remained on the bench for a number of games, Scully returned to the starting line-up with Fox having sustained a hand injury. Thistle defeated Queen of the South 5–0 with Scully earning his third clean sheet in four appearances.

Scully joined Albion Rovers in the 2013 winter transfer window on a sixth month loan. After that loan spell came to an end, Scully, along with David Wilson, signed a one-year contract extension.

At the start of 2013–14 season, Scully was among three players sent out on loan to gain first team experience. He joined relegated side Dunfermline Athletic on a six-month loan deal. Upon joining Dunfermline, he vowed to become the first choice goalkeeper. After establishing himself in the first team, the loan spell with Dunfermline was extended until the end of the season; Scully expressed his "delight" and had no hesitation in extending his loan with the club. After 46 appearances for Dunfermline in all competitions, Scully was awarded the club's Player of the Year award.

After returning from a successful loan spell with Dunfermline, Scully signed a two-year contract extension, keeping him at the club until 2016. In July 2014, he returned to Dunfermline on a season-long loan.

Scully made his Premiership debut for Thistle on 24 October 2019, coming on as a substitute for injured goalkeeper Tomáš Černý in a 1–1 draw with Hamilton Accies.

Thistle were relegated via the playoffs at the end of the 2017–18 season, and following that relegation, Scully was one of many players released by the club.

=== Greenock Morton ===
After his release from Thistle, Scully signed for fellow Championship side Greenock Morton. After losing his place in the first team to Derek Gaston, he asked to be released and was given a free transfer by mutual consent in January 2019.

=== Dunfermline Athletic ===
Scully become new Dunfermline manager Stevie Crawford's first signing in January 2019, returning to East End Park after three-and-a-half years. He signed on a six-month deal, with the option to extend for a further year. After 18 months with the club, he was released in May 2020 at the end of his contract.

=== Hamilton Academical ===
On 2 October 2020, Hamilton Academical announced the signing of Scully on a short-term deal until January 2021. On 19 May 2021 it was announced that he would leave Hamilton at the end of the season, following the expiry of his contract. However, in August 2021, Scully re-joined Accies in a player coach role. Scully remained at the club until November 2021, when he left to join the police.

He re-signed for Hamilton on 29 October 2022.

== Career statistics ==
As of 8 March 2020

Appearances and goals by club, season and competition
Club	Season	League			Scottish Cup		League Cup		Other		Total	
Club	Season	Division	Apps	Goals	Apps	Goals	Apps	Goals	Apps	Goals	Apps	Goals
Partick Thistle	2010–11	Scottish First Division	1	0	0	0	0	0	0	0	1	0
Partick Thistle	2011–12	Scottish First Division	5	0	0	0	0	0	0	0	5	0
Partick Thistle	2012–13	Scottish First Division	1	0	0	0	0	0	1 (Note: Appearances in the Scottish Challenge Cup)	0	2	0
Partick Thistle	2013–14	Scottish Premiership	0	0	0	0	0	0	—		0	0
Partick Thistle	2014–15	Scottish Premiership	0	0	0	0	0	0	—		0	0
Partick Thistle	2015–16	Scottish Premiership	10	0	0	0	0	0	—		10	0
Partick Thistle	2016–17	Scottish Premiership	7	0	0	0	1	0	—		8	0
Partick Thistle	2017–18	Scottish Premiership	6	0	0	0	1	0	—		7	0
Partick Thistle	Total		30	0	0	0	2	0	1	0	33	0
Albion Rovers (loan)	2012–13	Scottish Second Division	6	0	0	0	0	0	0	0	6	0
Dunfermline Athletic (loan)	2013–14	Scottish League One	34	0	4	0	2	0	6 (Note: Two appearances in the Scottish Challenge Cup and four in the Championship play-offs)	0	46	0
Dunfermline Athletic (loan)	2014–15	Scottish League One	34	0	3	0	2	0	2	0	41	0
Dunfermline Athletic (loan)	Total		68	0	7	0	4	0	8	0	87	0
Greenock Morton	2018–19	Scottish Championship	12	0	0	0	3	0	0	0	15	0
Dunfermline Athletic	2018–19	Scottish Championship	14	0	0	0	0	0	0	0	14	0
Dunfermline Athletic	2019–20	Scottish Championship	12	0	1	0	5	0	0	0	18	0
Dunfermline Athletic	Total		26	0	1	0	5	0	0	0	32	0
Hamilton Academical	2020–21	Scottish Premiership	0	0	0	0	0	0	0	0	0	0
Career total			142	0	8	0	14	0	9	0	173	0

== Honours ==
=== Individual ===
- Dunfermline Athletic Player of the Year: 2014; 2015
