= 2016–17 Partick Thistle F.C. season =

Partick Thistle
2016–17 season
- Manager: Alan Archibald
- Stadium: Firhill Stadium
- Premiership: Sixth Place
- League Cup: Second round
- Scottish Cup: Quarter-final
- Top goalscorer: League: Kris Doolan (14); All: Kris Doolan (15)
- Highest home attendance: 7,951 vs. Rangers, Premiership, 26 November 2016
- Lowest home attendance: 2,250 vs. Queen's Park, League Cup, 30 July 2016
- Average home league attendance: 3,946
Home colours	Away colours

The 2016–17 season was Partick Thistle's fourth consecutive season in the top flight of Scottish football and their fourth season Scottish Premiership, having been promoted from the Scottish First Division at the end of the 2012–13 season. Thistle also competed in the League Cup and the Scottish Cup.

== Scottish Premiership ==
6 August 2016 1	Partick Thistle	2 – 0	Inverness C.T.	Glasgow
15:00 BST (UTC+1)	Gordon (yellow card) 5'; Amoo (yellow card) 24' (goal) 60'; Erskine 36'	BBC Report	Polworth (yellow card) 69'	Stadium: Firhill Stadium; Attendance: 2,943; Referee: Nick Walsh

20 August 2016 3	Aberdeen	2 – 1	Partick Thistle	Aberdeen
15:00 BST (UTC+1)	McGinn 28' (yellow card) 66'; Storey 58'	BBC Report	Osman (yellow card) 27'; Devine (yellow card) 83'; Welsh (yellow card) 86' (yellow-red card) 87'; Erskine 90+1'	Stadium: Pittodrie Stadium; Attendance: 11,049

27 August 2016 4	Partick Thistle	1 – 2	Heart of Midlothian	Glasgow
15:00 BST (UTC+1)	Lindsay 55'; Osman (yellow card) 76'; Edwards (yellow card) 84'	BBC Report	Paterson 16'; Watt 90'	Stadium: Firhill Stadium; Attendance: 4,919; Referee: Willie Collum

10 September 2016 5	Partick Thistle	0 – 2	St Johnstone	Glasgow
15:00 BST (UTC+1)		BBC Report	Anderson 21'; MacLean 64'; Swanson (yellow card) 70'	Stadium: Firhill Stadium; Attendance: 2,885; Referee: Nick Walsh

17 September 2016 6	Kilmarnock	2 – 2	Partick Thistle	Kilmarnock
15:00 BST (UTC+1)	Boyd 17'; Hendrie (yellow card) 26'; Coulibaly 65'; Hawkshaw (yellow card) 68'	BBC Report	Lawless 32'; Gordon (yellow card) 54'; Lindsay 82'; Osman (yellow card) 85' (yellow-red card) 89'	Stadium: Rugby Park; Attendance: 4,169; Referee: Andrew Dallas

24 September 2016 7	Partick Thistle	1 – 1	Motherwell	Glasgow
15:00 BST (UTC+1)	Erskine 31'; Lindsay (yellow card) 63'	BBC Report	McDonald 83'; Cadden (yellow card) 86'	Stadium: Firhill Stadium; Attendance: 3,227; Referee: Craig Thomson

1 October 2016 8	Rangers	2 – 0	Partick Thistle	Glasgow
15:00 BST (UTC+1)	Kranjčar 33'; Halliday 40'; Senderos (yellow card) 45'	BBC Report	Erskine (yellow card) 44'; Gordon (yellow card) 57'	Stadium: Ibrox Stadium; Attendance: 49,680; Referee: Stephen Finnie

15 October 2016 9	Partick Thistle	2 – 2	Hamilton Academical	Glasgow
15:00 BST (UTC+1)	Edwards 22'; Lindsay 43'; Gordon (yellow card) 54'	BBC Report	Donati 14'; Sarris (yellow card) 40'; Docherty (yellow card) 58'; Brophy 83'	Stadium: Firhill Stadium; Attendance: 2,843; Referee: Greg Aitken

22 October 2016 10	Partick Thistle	1 – 1	Ross County	Glasgow
15:00 BST (UTC+1)	Welsh 24' (pen.); Azeez (yellow card) 58'	BBC Report	Davies (yellow card) 12'; Curran (yellow card) 50'; Dow (yellow card) 90+3'; Burke 90+5'	Stadium: Firhill Stadium; Attendance: 3,777; Referee: Don Robertson

26 October 2016 11	Dundee	0 – 2	Partick Thistle	Dundee
19:45 BST (UTC+1)	McGowan (yellow card) 78'	BBC Report	Azeez 29' (yellow card) 79'; Doolan 62'; Wilson (yellow card) 90+1'; Elliott (yellow card) 90+3'	Stadium: Dens Park; Attendance: 4,783; Referee: Steven McLean

29 October 2016 12	St Johnstone	1 – 2	Partick Thistle	Perth
15:00 BST (UTC+1)	MacLean 18'; Cummins (yellow card) 59'	BBC Report	Doolan 17'; Barton (yellow card) 77'; Lindsay (yellow card) 90'; Osman 90+1' (yellow card) 90+2'	Stadium: McDiarmid Park; Attendance: 3,096; Referee: Barry Cook

4 November 2016 13	Partick Thistle	1 – 2	Aberdeen	Glasgow
19:45 GMT (UTC)	Barton 51'; Devine (yellow card) 56'; Welsh (yellow card) 81'	BBC Report	O'Connor 39'; Stockley 53'	Stadium: Firhill Stadium; Attendance: 3,974; Referee: Bobby Madden

19 November 2016 14	Motherwell	2 – 0	Partick Thistle	Motherwell
15:00 GMT (UTC)	Moult 14'; McDonald 38'; Tait (yellow card) 90+2'	BBC Report	Devine (yellow card) 15'; Welsh (yellow card) 45+1'; Osman (yellow card) 86'; Booth (yellow card) 90+2'	Stadium: Fir Park; Attendance: 3,759; Referee: Andrew Dallas

26 November 2016 15	Partick Thistle	1 – 2	Rangers	Glasgow
12:15 GMT (UTC)	Elliott (yellow card) 40'; Doolan 76'	BBC Report	Garner (yellow card) 45'; Dodoo 81', 90+4' (yellow card) 81'; O'Halloran (yellow card) 90'; Wallace (yellow card) 90+2'	Stadium: Firhill Stadium; Attendance: 7,951; Referee: Nick Walsh

3 December 2016 16	Hamilton Academical	1 – 1	Partick Thistle	Hamilton
15:00 GMT (UTC)	D'Acol 15'; Gillespie (yellow card) 40'; MacKinnon (yellow card) 50'; Crawford (yellow card) 84'; Seaborne (yellow card) 87'	BBC Report	Welsh 61'; Lindsay (yellow card) 90'	Stadium: New Douglas Park; Attendance: 2,210; Referee: Don Robertson

9 December 2016 17	Partick Thistle	1 – 4	Celtic	Glasgow
19:45 GMT (UTC)	Gordon (yellow card) 36'; Lindsay 61'; Azeez (yellow card) 80'	BBC Report	Armstrong 39', 49'; Griffiths 50'; McGregor 82'	Stadium: Firhill Stadium; Attendance: 7,609; Referee: Craig Thomson

17 December 2016 18	Heart of Midlothian	1 – 1	Partick Thistle	Edinburgh
15:00 GMT (UTC)	Johnsen 17'	BBC Report	Devine (yellow card) 25'; Welsh 47'; Osman (yellow card) 64'	Stadium: Tynecastle Stadium; Attendance: 16,418; Referee: Don Robertson

20 December 2016 2	Celtic	1 – 0	Partick Thistle	Glasgow
19:45 GMT (UTC)	Sinclair 16'; Šimunović (yellow card) 42'; Izaguirre (yellow card) 68'	BBC Report	Booth (yellow card) 16'; Welsh (yellow card) 65'	Stadium: Celtic Park; Attendance: 55,733; Referee: Euan Anderson

23 December 2016 19	Ross County	1 – 3	Partick Thistle	Dingwall
19:45 GMT (UTC)	Boyce 83'; Routis (yellow card) 90+3'	BBC Report	Lindsay 50'; Doolan 62'; Erskine 78'	Stadium: Global Energy Stadium; Attendance: 2,935; Referee: John Beaton

28 December 2016 20	Partick Thistle	2 – 0	Dundee	Glasgow
19:45 GMT (UTC)	Booth 16' (yellow card) 75'; Doolan 44'; Elliott (yellow card) 65'; Devine (yellow card) 77'; Osman (yellow card) 83'; Welsh (yellow card) 90+5'	BBC Report	O'Dea (yellow card) 76'; Haber (yellow card) 81'	Stadium: Firhill Stadium; Attendance: 3,758; Referee: Alan Muir

31 December 2016 21	Partick Thistle	0 – 0	Kilmarnock	Glasgow
14:00 GMT (UTC)	Booth (yellow card) 43'	BBC Report	Adams (yellow card) 45'	Stadium: Firhill Stadium; Attendance: 3,584; Referee: Kevin Clancy

28 January 2017 22	Inverness Caledonian Thistle	0 – 0	Partick Thistle	Inverness
15:00 GMT (UTC)	Warren (yellow card) 66'; Anier (yellow card) 73'	BBC Report		Stadium: Caledonian Stadium; Attendance: 2,823; Referee: Stephen Finnie

1 February 2017 23	Partick Thistle	0 – 1	St Johnstone	Glasgow
19:45 GMT (UTC)	Edwards (yellow card) 70'; Elliott (red card) 90+2'	BBC Report	MacLean 40'; Swanson (yellow card) 60'; Anderson (yellow card) 69'	Stadium: Firhill Stadium; Attendance: 2,257; Referee: Crawford Allan

4 February 2017 24	Aberdeen	2 – 0	Partick Thistle	Aberdeen
15:00 GMT (UTC)	Jack (yellow card) 40'; Considine (yellow card) 54'; Stockley 72'; Christie 90+2'	BBC Report		Stadium: Pittodrie Stadium; Attendance: 10,094; Referee: Greg Aitken

18 February 2017 25	Partick Thistle	2 – 0	Hamilton Academical	Glasgow
15:00 GMT (UTC)	Doolan 68', 79'; Lawless (yellow card) 81'	BBC Report	Devlin (yellow card) 61'; Watson (yellow card) 64'; Skondras (yellow card) 76'	Stadium: Firhill Stadium; Attendance: 3,057; Referee: Willie Collum

25 February 2017 26	Partick Thistle	2 – 0	Heart of Midlothian	Glasgow
15:00 GMT (UTC)	Doolan 5'; Elliott (yellow card) 54'; Lindsay 73'; Lawless (yellow card) 86'; Azeez (yellow card) 88'	Report	Nicholson (yellow card) 47'; Gonçalves (yellow card) 49' (yellow-red card)	Stadium: Firhill Stadium; Attendance: 4,143; Referee: Nick Walsh

1 March 2017 27	Dundee	0 – 1	Partick Thistle	Dundee
19:45 GMT (UTC)		Report	Julen Etxabeguren 30' (o.g.); Barton (yellow card) 70'; Erskine (yellow card) 71'	Stadium: Dens Park; Attendance: 5,328; Referee: John Beaton

11 March 2017 28	Partick Thistle	1 – 1	Inverness Caledonian Thistle	Glasgow
15:00 GMT (UTC)	Doolan 56'; Amoo (yellow card) 83'	Report	Vigurs (yellow card) 21'; McCart (yellow card) 45+3'; Warren 90+2'	Stadium: Firhill Stadium; Attendance: 3,082; Referee: Willie Collum

18 March 2017 29	Kilmarnock	1 – 1	Partick Thistle	Kilmarnock
15:00 GMT (UTC)	Hendrie (yellow card) 36'; Sammon 87'	Report	Erskine 73'	Stadium: Rugby Park; Attendance: 4,519; Referee: John Beaton

1 April 2017 30	Partick Thistle	2 – 1	Ross County	Glasgow
15:00 BST (UTC+1)	Doolan 64', 79' (yellow card) 65'; Edwards (yellow card) 68'; Lawless (yellow card) 74'	Report	Curran 58'; Fraser	Stadium: Firhill Stadium; Attendance: 3,149; Referee: Willie Collum

5 April 2017 31	Celtic	1 – 1	Partick Thistle	Glasgow
19:45 BST (UTC+1)	Sinclair 50'; Bitton (yellow card) 90+2'	Report	Booth (yellow card) 51'; Azeez 64' (yellow card) 65'; Keown (yellow card) 89'	Stadium: Celtic Park; Attendance: 54,047; Referee: Greg Aitken

8 April 2017 32	Partick Thistle	1 – 0	Motherwell	Glasgow
15:00 BST (UTC+1)	Doolan 11'	Report		Stadium: Firhill Stadium; Attendance: 3,920; Referee: John Beaton

15 April 2017 33	Rangers	2 – 0	Partick Thistle	Glasgow
15:00 BST (UTC+1)	Miller 39'; Toral 54'	Report	Erskine (yellow card) 83'; Nisbet (yellow card) 90+2'	Stadium: Ibrox Stadium; Attendance: 49,748; Referee: Nick Walsh

29 April 2017 34	Heart of Midlothian	2 – 2	Partick Thistle	Edinburgh
15:00 BST (UTC+1)	Gonçalves 69' (pen.); Struna 88'; Walker (yellow card) 89'	Report	Doolan 50'; Devine (yellow card) 60' (yellow-red card) 68'; Černý (yellow card) 68'; Lawless 72'; McCarthy (yellow card) 83'; Edwards (yellow card) 84'	Stadium: Tynecastle Stadium; Attendance: 15,930; Referee: Andrew Dallas

7 May 2017 35	Partick Thistle	1 – 2	Rangers	Glasgow
12:15 BST (UTC+1)	Doolan 14'; Booth (yellow card) 70'	Report	McKay 83'; Garner 90+4' (yellow card) 90+5'	Stadium: Firhill Stadium; Attendance: 6,799; Referee: Crawford Allan

13 May 2017 36	St Johnstone	1 – 0	Partick Thistle	Perth
15:00 BST (UTC+1)	Swanson 33' (pen.) (yellow card) 83'; MacLean (yellow card) 60'; Craig (yellow card) 67'	Report	Devine (yellow card) 17'; Edwards (yellow card) 24'; Elliott (yellow card) 82'	Stadium: McDiarmid Park; Attendance: 3,630; Referee: Stephen Finnie

18 May 2017 37	Partick Thistle	0 – 5	Celtic	Glasgow
19:45 BST (UTC+1)		Report	Griffiths 18' (pen.); Rogic 26'; Roberts 41', 84'; McGregor 82'	Stadium: Firhill Stadium; Attendance: 7,847; Referee: Andrew Dallas

21 May 2017 38	Partick Thistle	0 – 6	Aberdeen	Glasgow
15:00 BST (UTC+1)	Edwards (yellow card) 34'; Lamont (yellow card) 70'	Report	Christie 7', 45'; Wright 11', 17', 51'; Hayes 26'; Considine (yellow card) 44'; Pawlett (yellow card) 56'	Stadium: Firhill Stadium; Attendance: 3,924; Referee: Euan Anderson

== Scottish League Cup ==
=== Group stage ===
Results

15 July 2016 1	Airdrieonians	0 – 1	Partick Thistle	Airdrie
19:30 BST (UTC+1)		Report	Doolan 55'; Edwards (yellow card) 80'; Devine (yellow card) 90+3'	Stadium: Excelsior Stadium; Attendance: 1,632; Referee: Kevin Clancy

23 July 2016 2	Partick Thistle	2 – 1	Queen of the South	Glasgow
15:00 BST (UTC+1)	Erskine 82'; Lawless 90'	Report	Lindsay 48' (o.g.); Tapping (yellow card) 58'	Stadium: Firhill Stadium; Attendance: 2,358; Referee: Alan Muir

26 July 2016 3	Stenhousemuir	1 – 4	Partick Thistle	Stenhousemuir
19:30 BST (UTC+1)	L.McCroary 73'	Report	Pogba 20'; Welsh 22' (pen.); Amoo 85'; Azeez 86'	Stadium: Ochilview Park; Attendance: 1,433; Referee: Don Robertson

30 July 2016 4	Partick Thistle	2 – 0	Queen's Park	Glasgow
15:00 BST (UTC+1)	Erskine 6'; Lindsay 78'	Report		Stadium: Firhill Stadium; Attendance: 2,250; Referee: Andrew Dallas

=== Group E Table ===
Pos	Team	Pld	W	PW	PL	L	GF	GA	GD	Pts	Qualification	PAR	QOS	AIR	QPA	STE
1	Partick Thistle (Q)	4	4	0	0	0	9	2	+7	12	Qualification for the Second Round	—	2–1	—	2–0	—
2	Queen of the South (Q)	4	3	0	0	1	6	2	+4	9	Qualification for the Second Round	—	—	2–0	—	1–0
3	Airdrieonians	4	1	1	0	2	5	7	−2	5		0–1	—	—	—	2–1
4	Queen's Park	4	1	0	1	2	5	7	−2	4		—	0–2	p3–3	—	—
5	Stenhousemuir	4	0	0	0	4	2	9	−7	0		1–4	—	—	0–2	—

Source: SPFL
(Q) Qualified to the phase indicated

== Knockout stage ==
9 August 2016 Last 16	Dundee United	3 – 1	Partick Thistle	Dundee
19:45 BST (UTC+1)	C Smith 10', 27', 30' (pen.); Flood (yellow card) 62'; Donaldson (yellow card) 64'	Report	Gordon (yellow card) 30'; Osman (yellow card) 54'; Welsh 65' (pen.); Devine (yellow card) 66'; Booth (yellow card) 73'; Edwards (yellow card) 87'	Stadium: Tannadice Park; Attendance: 5,036; Referee: Steven McLean

== Scottish Cup ==
21 January 2017 Fourth round	Partick Thistle	4 – 0	Formartine United	Glasgow
15:00 GMT (UTC)	Erskine 10', 31'; Lawless 30'; Osman 64'	BBC Report		Stadium: Firhill Stadium; Attendance: 2,782; Referee: Craig Charleston

11 February 2017 Fifth round	St Johnstone	0 – 1	Partick Thistle	Perth
15:00 GMT (UTC)	MacLean (yellow card) 40'; Swanson (yellow card) 75'	BBC Report	Barton 7'; Welsh (yellow card) 65'; Devine (yellow card) 72'	Stadium: McDiarmid Park; Attendance: 2,884; Referee: Steven McLean

5 March 2017 Quarter-final	Aberdeen	1 – 0	Partick Thistle	Aberdeen
15:00 GMT (UTC)	Shinnie 43'	Report	Erskine (yellow card) 37'; Edwards (yellow card) 45+1'; Devine (yellow card) 70' (yellow-red card); Osman (yellow card) 82'	Stadium: Pittodrie Stadium; Attendance: 11,333; Referee: Craig Thomson

== Squad statistics ==
=== Appearances ===
As of match played 21 May 2017

No.	Pos	Nat	Player	Total		Scottish Premiership		Scottish Cup		Scottish League Cup	
No.	Pos	Nat	Player	Apps	Goals	Apps	Goals	Apps	Goals	Apps	Goals
1	GK	(Czech Republic) CZE	Tomáš Černý	31	0	27	0	3	0	1	0
2	DF	(Sierra Leone) SLE	Mustapha Dumbuya	9	0	8	0	0+1	0	0	0
3	DF	(Scotland) SCO	Callum Booth	38	1	31	1	2	0	5	0
4	MF	(Scotland) SCO	Sean Welsh	28	5	18+3	3	2	0	5	2
5	DF	(Scotland) SCO	Liam Lindsay	42	7	36	6	2	0	4	1
6	MF	(Ghana) GHA	Abdul Osman	35	2	30+1	1	3	1	1	0
7	FW	(England) ENG	David Amoo	31	2	14+11	1	2	0	3+1	1
9	FW	(Scotland) SCO	Kris Doolan	45	10	29+8	9	2+1	0	4+1	1
10	MF	(Scotland) SCO	Chris Erskine	42	9	25+11	5	2	2	4	2
11	MF	(Scotland) SCO	Steven Lawless	38	3	24+6	1	2+1	1	5	1
12	GK	(Scotland) SCO	Ryan Scully	8	0	6+1	0	0	0	1	0
13	MF	(Northern Ireland) NIR	Adam Barton	34	2	30+1	1	3	1	0	0
14	FW	(England) ENG	Christie Elliott	33	0	26+5	0	2	0	0	0
15	DF	(Northern Ireland) NIR	Danny Devine	36	0	28+2	0	3	0	3	0
16	FW	(England) ENG	Ade Azeez	46	2	19+19	1	1+2	0	1+4	1
17	DF	(Republic of Ireland) IRL	Niall Keown	16	0	14	0	2	0	0	0
19	MF	(Australia) AUS	Ryan Edwards	45	1	33+5	1	2	0	2+3	0
20	MF	(Scotland) SCO	Declan McDaid	5	0	0+3	0	0	0	1+1	0
21	DF	(Scotland) SCO	David Syme	2	0	0	0	0	0	2	0
26	FW	(Scotland) SCO	Neil McLaughlin	1	0	0+1	0	0	0	0	0
27	FW	(Scotland) SCO	Kevin Nisbet	5	0	0+3	0	0+1	0	0+1	0
30	MF	(Scotland) SCO	Andrew McCarthy	6	0	3+2	0	0+1	0	0	0
32	FW	(Scotland) SCO	Mark Lamont	1	0	0+1	0	0	0	0	0
35	GK	(Scotland) SCO	Mark Ridgers	8	0	4+1	0	0	0	3	0
38	DF	(Scotland) SCO	Ross Fleming	1	0	0+1	0	0	0	0	0
Players away from the club on loan:
18	FW	(Scotland) SCO	David Wilson	4	0	0+1	0	0	0	3	0
Players who left Partick Thistle during the season:
23	DF	(Scotland) SCO	Ziggy Gordon	19	0	12+2	0	0	0	5	0
99	FW	(Guinea) GUI	Mathias Pogba	6	1	0+2	0	0	0	1+3	1

== Goal scorers ==
As of match played 21 May 2017

Ranking	Nation	Position	Number	Name	Scottish Premiership	Scottish Cup	Scottish League Cup	Total
1	FW	(Scotland)	9	Kris Doolan	14	0	1	15
2	MF	(Scotland)	10	Chris Erskine	5	2	2	9
3	DF	(Scotland)	5	Liam Lindsay	6	0	1	7
4	MF	(Scotland)	4	Sean Welsh	3	0	2	5
5	MF	(Scotland)	11	Steven Lawless	2	1	1	4
6	FW	(England)	16	Ade Azeez	2	0	1	3
7	MF	(Ghana)	6	Abdul Osman	1	1	0	2
7	MF	(Northern Ireland)	13	Adam Barton	1	1	0	2
7	FW	(England)	7	David Amoo	1	0	1	2
10	MF	(Australia)	19	Ryan Edwards	1	0	0	1
10	DF	(Scotland)	3	Callum Booth	1	0	0	1
10	FW	(Guinea)	99	Mathias Pogba	0	0	1	1
10				Own goal	1	0	0	1
TOTALS					38	4	10	52

== Disciplinary record ==
As of match played 21 May 2017

Nation	Position	Number	Name	Premier League		Scottish Cup		League Cup		Total	
Nation	Position	Number	Name	Yellow card	Red card	Yellow card	Red card	Yellow card	Red card	Yellow card	Red card
(Czech Republic)	GK	1	Tomáš Černý	1	0	0	0	0	0	1	0
(Scotland)	DF	3	Callum Booth	4	0	0	0	1	0	7	0
(Scotland)	MF	4	Sean Welsh	6	1	1	0	0	0	7	1
(Scotland)	DF	5	Liam Lindsay	3	0	0	0	0	0	3	0
(Ghana)	MF	6	Abdul Osman	8	1	1	0	1	0	10	1
(England)	FW	7	David Amoo	2	0	0	0	0	0	2	0
(Scotland)	FW	9	Kris Doolan	1	0	0	0	0	0	1	0
(Scotland)	MF	10	Chris Erskine	3	0	1	0	0	0	4	0
(Scotland)	MF	11	Steven Lawless	3	0	0	0	0	0	3	0
(Northern Ireland)	MF	13	Adam Barton	2	0	0	0	0	0	2	0
(England)	FW	14	Christie Elliott	5	1	0	0	0	0	5	1
(Northern Ireland)	DF	15	Danny Devine	8	1	3	1	2	0	13	2
(England)	FW	16	Ade Azeez	5	0	0	0	0	0	5	0
(Republic of Ireland)	DF	17	Niall Keown	1	0	0	0	0	0	1	0
(Scotland)	FW	18	David Wilson	1	0	0	0	0	0	1	0
(Australia)	MF	19	Ryan Edwards	6	0	1	0	2	0	9	0
(Scotland)	DF	23	Ziggy Gordon	5	0	0	0	1	0	6	0
(Scotland)	FW	27	Kevin Nisbet	1	0	0	0	0	0	1	0
(Scotland)	MF	30	Andrew McCarthy	1	0	0	0	0	0	1	0
(Scotland)	FW	32	Mark Lamont	1	0	0	0	0	0	1	0
			TOTALS	67	4	7	1	7	0	81	5

=== Results summary ===
Overall								Home						Away					
Pld	W	D	L	GF	GA	GD	Pts	W	D	L	GF	GA	GD	W	D	L	GF	GA	GD
38	10	12	16	38	54	−16	42	6	5	9	21	32	−11	4	7	7	17	22	−5

Source: See Results

== Transfers ==
=== In ===
Date	Position	Nationality	Name	From	Fee
16 June 2016	GK	(Northern Ireland)	Danny Devine	Inverness Caledonian Thistle	Free
16 June 2016	DF	(Scotland)	David Syme	Kilmarnock	Free
1 July 2016	FW	(England)	Ade Azeez	AFC Wimbledon	Free
11 July 2016	DF	(Scotland)	Ziggy Gordon	Hamilton Academical	Free
15 July 2016	GK	(Scotland)	David Crawford	Alloa Athletic	Free
31 August 2016	MF	(Northern Ireland)	Adam Barton	Portsmouth	Undisclosed
16 September 2016	GK	(Germany)	Thorsten Stuckmann	Doncaster Rovers	Free
3 January 2017	GK	(Scotland)	Mark Ridgers	Orlando City B	Free

=== Out ===
Date	Position	Nationality	Name	To	Fee
1 June 2016	FW	(Australia)	Chris Duggan	East Fife	Free
6 June 2016	DF	(Belgium)	Frédéric Frans	Lierse	Free
16 June 2016	GK	(Scotland)	Paul Gallacher	Heart of Midlothian	Free
23 June 2016	DF	(Scotland)	Gary Miller	Plymouth Argyle	Free
25 August 2016	DF	(England)	Danny Seaborne	Hamilton Academical	Free
31 August 2016	FW	(Guinea)	Mathias Pogba	Sparta Rotterdam	Free
29 October 2016	GK	(Scotland)	David Crawford	Stenhousemuir	Free
3 January 2017	GK	(Germany)	Thorsten Stuckmann	Chesterfield	Free
26 January 2017	DF	(Scotland)	Ziggy Gordon	Jagiellonia Białystok	Free

=== Loans in ===
Date from	Date to	Position	Nationality	Name	From
24 January 2017	End of season	DF	(Republic of Ireland)	Niall Keown	Reading

=== Loans out ===
Date from	Date to	Position	Nationality	Name	To
9 August 2016	14 January 2017	FW	(Scotland)	Kevin Nisbet	Ayr United

== See also ==
- List of Partick Thistle F.C. seasons
