= Kieran Burns =

Scottish footballer

Personal information
- Date of birth: 24 March 1992 (age 34)
- Place of birth: Glasgow, Scotland
- Position: Forward

Team information
- Current team: Clydebank

Youth career
- –2009: Partick Thistle

Senior career*
Years	Team	Apps	(Gls)
2009–2012	Partick Thistle	7	(0)
2011–2012	→ Clydebank (loan)	10	(5)
2012–2013	Irvine Meadow		
2013–	Clydebank		
- * Club domestic league appearances and goals as of 15:30, 5 April 2013 (UTC)

Kieran Burns (born 24 March 1992) is a Scottish professional footballer who plays as a forward for Clydebank in the Scottish Junior Football Association, West Region.

== Club career ==
Burns came through the youth system at Glasgow's Partick Thistle. He was promoted to the first team after agreeing a full-time contract with the club as a 17-year-old in the summer of 2009.

He made his first team league debut at the end of the 2009–10 season, replacing teammate Mark Corcoran as a 75th-minute substitute in a 0–0 home draw against Raith Rovers.

His first league start came in the following 2010–11 season, in a 0–0 home draw to Dundee in March 2011. He also represented Partick Thistle in the 2010–11 Scottish Challenge Cup, during which the team reached the semi-finals.

Burns featured in pre-season friendly matches in advance of the 2011–12 season, such as a 2–0 defeat away to Blyth Spartans. On 16 September 2011 he agreed a 93-day loan move to Scottish Junior side Clydebank. He made his Clydebank debut as a substitute in a league game versus Arthurlie F.C. on the following day.

After his release from Partick in the summer of 2012, Burns signed for West Region Junior champions Irvine Meadow however the player rejoined Clydebank in March 2013.

== Personal life ==
Burns's father died of cancer in April 2010. The news reached the player 20 minutes in advance of a home match against Dundee, during which he was expected to make his home debut. He left that match to be with his family, but did score the following day in an under-19 fixture with Dumbarton.

== Career statistics ==
As of 2 October 2011

Club statistics
Club	Season	League		National Cup		League Cup		Other		Total	
Club	Season	App	Goals	App	Goals	App	Goals	App	Goals	App	Goals
Partick Thistle	2009–10 season	5	0	0	0	0	0	0	0	5	0
Partick Thistle	2010–11 season	2	0	0	0	0	0	1	0	3	0
Partick Thistle	2011–12 season	0	0	0	0	0	0	0	0	0	0
Clydebank	2011–12 season	2	0	0	0	0	0	0	0	2	0
Total		9	0	0	0	0	0	1	0	10	0
