= Chris Erskine =

Scottish footballer (born 1987)

Personal information
- Date of birth: 8 February 1987 (age 39)
- Place of birth: Rutherglen, Scotland
- Position: Attacking midfielder

Youth career
- Clyde
- Calderwood Blue Star

Senior career*
Years	Team	Apps	(Gls)
2005–2009	Kilbirnie Ladeside		
2009–2013	Partick Thistle	137	(26)
2013–2016	Dundee United	57	(8)
2014	→ Partick Thistle (loan)	15	(2)
2016–2019	Partick Thistle	82	(13)
2019–2020	Livingston	19	(1)
2020–2022	East Kilbride	11	(3)
2021	→ Partick Thistle (loan)	2	(0)
2022–2023	St Cadoc's		
2024–2025	Glenafton Athletic	18	(3)
- * Club domestic league appearances and goals as of 22:10, 1 January 2022 (UTC)

Chris Erskine (born 8 February 1987) is a Scottish professional footballer who plays as an attacking midfielder.

He is most associated for his various spells with Partick Thistle. He has also previously played for junior side Kilbirnie Ladeside where he began his career, Dundee United, Livingston and East Kilbride.

== Early life ==
Erskine was born in Rutherglen. He was briefly a youth player with Clyde aged around 12 or 13 before joining Calderwood Blue Star, a boys' team in East Kilbride.

== Playing career ==
Erskine joined junior football team Kilbirnie Ladeside at the age of 18. Having spent four years at Kilbirnie while also working as a pipe fitter at Glasgow shipyards, he signed a one-year contract with Partick Thistle at the start of season 2009–10. He made his professional debut against Airdrie United, and in his home debut against Berwick Rangers scored twice in a 5–1 victory. On 9 April 2011, Erskine scored two goals in ten minutes against Falkirk. On 17 March 2012, he made his 100th appearance for Thistle and scored two goals in the 5–0 win at Palmerston Park over Queen of the South.

On 16 April 2013 it was announced that Erskine, along with Thistle teammate Paul Paton, had signed a pre-contract agreement with Dundee United and would join at the start of the 2013–14 season. He scored his first goal for Dundee United in a 4–0 win against St Mirren. On 20 January 2014, Erskine returned to Partick Thistle on loan until the end of the season, after failing to secure a regular place in the Dundee United team. Returning to Dundee United for the 2014–15 season, Erskine scored in their first game of the season, a 3–0 win against Aberdeen at Pittodrie.

After signing a pre-contract agreement in January 2016, Erskine rejoined Partick Thistle permanently in June 2016. The first goal of his third spell at the club came on the first day of the 2016–17 Scottish Premiership season, in a 2–0 victory at home to Inverness Caledonian Thistle. In December 2016 he made his 200th appearance for Thistle. The season ended with the club achieving a top six finish, Erskine making 42 appearances and scoring 9 goals in all competitions.

Erskine was confirmed as Thistle's player of the year for the 2017–18 season, despite having stated he was 'embarrassed' to be nominated after the club's poor performances over the campaign; ultimately they were relegated to the Championship after losing the play-off against Livingston. He left Partick Thistle in January 2019 after falling out of favour with new manager Gary Caldwell, joining Premiership club Livingston in January 2019 for a nominal transfer fee and signing an eighteen-month contract.

Erskine joined his hometown club, East Kilbride of the Lowland League, in July 2020. In March 2021, he began his fourth spell with Partick Thistle, now managed by Ian McCall, joining on loan from East Kilbride until the end of the season. He only made two substitute appearances, suffering a hamstring injury in a game against Forfar Athletic which ruled him out for the remainder of the season. After Thistle won the League One title, Erskine returned to East Kilbride. He left East Kilbride in June 2022 after being unable to agree terms on a new contract, subsequently signing for West of Scotland League club St Cadoc's.

In October 2024 Erskine signed for Scottish 6th tier side Glenafton Athletic.

== Personal life ==
His younger brother Liam McLaughlin is also a footballer who has played in the Junior leagues for East Kilbride Thistle.

== Career statistics ==
As of 21:24, 16 July 2020

Appearances and goals by club, season and competition
Club	Season	League			Scottish Cup		League Cup		Other		Total	
Club	Season	Division	Apps	Goals	Apps	Goals	Apps	Goals	Apps	Goals	Apps	Goals
Partick Thistle	2009–10	Scottish First Division	34	1	1	0	2	2	3 (Note: Appearances in the Scottish Challenge Cup)	0	40	3
Partick Thistle	2010–11	Scottish First Division	34	7	4	1	1	0	0	0	38	8
Partick Thistle	2011–12	Scottish First Division	35	7	3	1	2	0	2	0	42	8
Partick Thistle	2012–13	Scottish First Division	34	11	2	0	2	1	5	4	43	16
Partick Thistle	Total		137	26	10	2	7	3	10	4	164	35
Dundee United	2013–14	Scottish Premiership	8	1	0	0	1	0	—		9	1
Dundee United	2014–15	Scottish Premiership	34	6	4	1	3	1	—		41	8
Dundee United	2015–16	Scottish Premiership	15	1	3	0	0	0	—		18	1
Dundee United	Total		57	8	7	1	4	1	0	0	68	10
Partick Thistle (loan)	2013–14	Scottish Premiership	15	2	0	0	—		—		15	2
Partick Thistle	2016–17	Scottish Premiership	36	5	2	2	4	2	—		42	9
Partick Thistle	2017–18	Scottish Premiership	28	5	2	0	5	2	1 (Note: Appearances in the Scottish Premiership play-offs)	0	36	7
Partick Thistle	2018–19	Scottish Championship	18	3	0	0	4	0	2	0	24	3
Partick Thistle	Total		82	13	4	2	13	4	3	0	102	19
Livingston	2018–19	Scottish Premiership	10	1	1	0	0	0	—		11	1
Livingston	2019–20	Scottish Premiership	9	0	1	0	3	0	—		13	0
Livingston	Total		19	1	2	0	3	0	0	0	24	1
Career total			310	50	23	5	27	8	13	4	373	67

== Honours ==
=== Club ===
Partick Thistle

- Scottish First Division (second tier): 2012–13

=== Individual ===
- PFA Scotland First Division Team of the Year: 2012–13
