= Paul Paton =

Scottish footballer (born 1987)

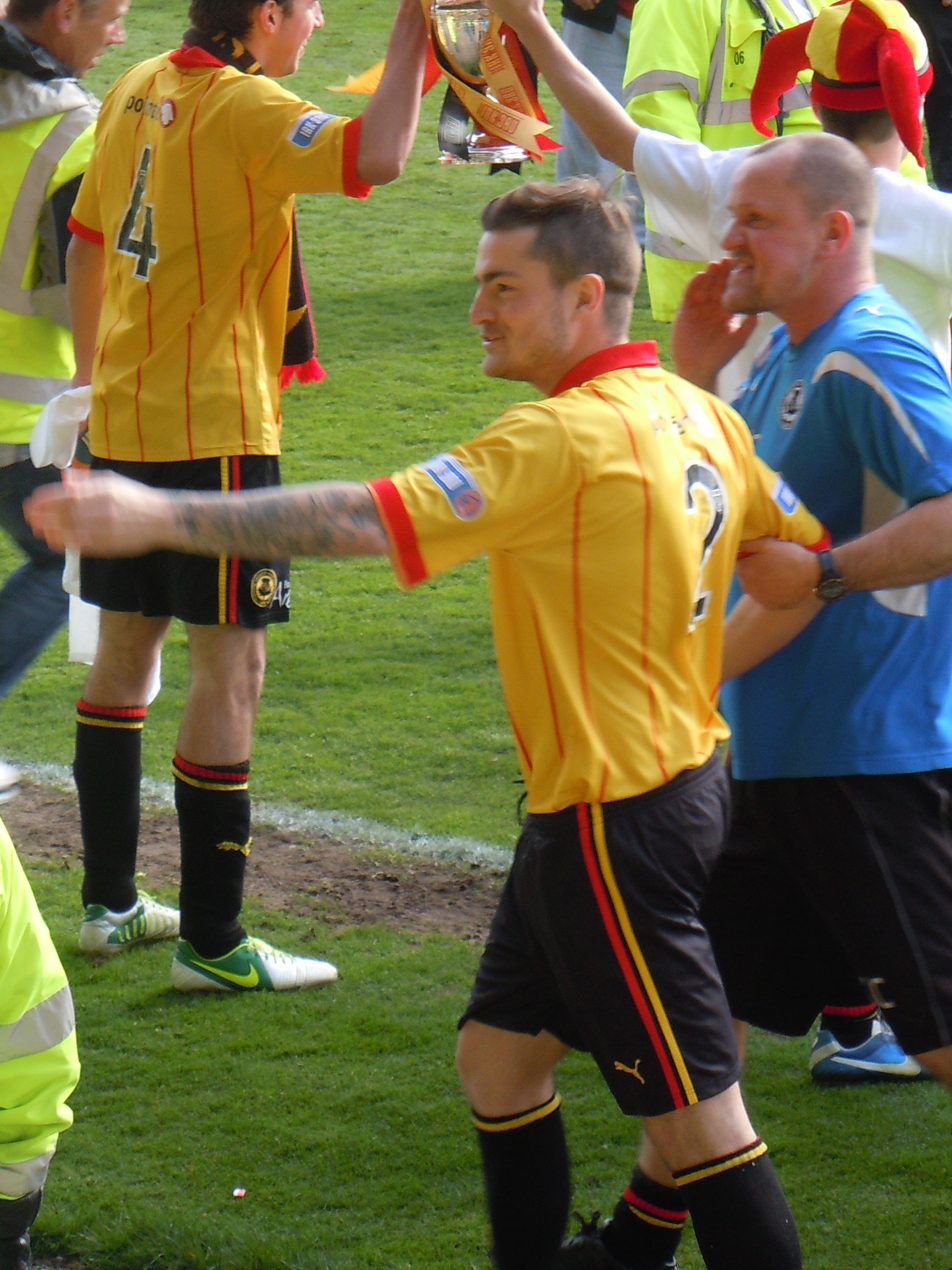
- Paton playing for Partick Thistle in 2013

Personal information
- Full name: Paul Raymond Paton
- Date of birth: 18 April 1987 (age 39)
- Place of birth: Paisley, Scotland
- Position: Defensive midfielder

Team information
- Current team: Glenafton Athletic (manager)

Senior career*
Years	Team	Apps	(Gls)
2005–2008	Queen's Park	88	(1)
2008–2013	Partick Thistle	147	(5)
2013–2016	Dundee United	75	(6)
2016–2018	St Johnstone	45	(1)
2018	Plymouth Argyle	3	(0)
2018–2019	Falkirk	29	(1)
2019–2020	Dunfermline Athletic	24	(0)
2020–2021	East Kilbride		
2021	→ Airdrieonians (loan)	6	(0)
2021–2022	Dumbarton	22	(3)
2022–2024	Glenafton Athletic		
2024	Irvine Meadow		

International career
2014–2017	Northern Ireland	4	(0)

Managerial career
- 2024-: Glenafton Athletic
- * Club domestic league appearances and goals

Paul Raymond Paton (born 18 April 1987) is a coach and former professional footballer who manages West of Scotland Football League club Glenafton Athletic.

He played as a defensive midfielder for Queen's Park, Partick Thistle, Dundee United, St Johnstone, Plymouth Argyle, Falkirk, Dunfermline Athletic, East Kilbride and Dumbarton, and had a spell on loan to Airdrieonians.

Born in Scotland, Paton represented Northern Ireland at international level.

== Club career ==
=== Queen's Park ===
Paton played for Queen's Park from 2005 until 2008. His displays at right back were key in Queen's winning promotion to the Second Division. He scored the goal which gave Queen's the lead in the second leg of the playoff final against East Fife at New Bayview.

=== Partick Thistle ===
Paton signed for Partick Thistle in May 2008, on a three-year contract. He played a significant role in Thistle winning promotion in the 2012–13 season, during which he was the club captain.

=== Dundee United ===
On 16 April 2013 it was announced that Paton would follow former Thistle manager Jackie McNamara, along with Thistle teammate Chris Erskine, to join Dundee United for the start of the 2013–14 season. Paton scored his first goal for the club in a 4–0 win against Motherwell. Having established himself as a first team regular, Paton was rewarded with a contract extension at the beginning of the following season to keep him at the club until 2017. In the 2014–15 season Paton was named as SPFL Player of the Month for September 2014.

On 18 December 2014, Paton was found guilty by an SFA Disciplinary Tribunal of spitting at Aberdeen player Jonny Hayes during the match between Dundee United and Aberdeen five days earlier, and was given a two-match suspension, despite Hayes saying that Paton had not spat at him. Dundee United announced they would be appealing the suspension but were told that the SFA's fast-track judicial system did not allow this.

In April 2015, Paton suffered a knee injury which kept him out for the rest of the season and most of the 2015–16 season. He made his return for United in the latter stages of a Scottish Cup fourth round match against Airdrieonians where United won 1–0 in January 2016. He scored his first goal of the season in the final minutes of a 2–1 win over Heart of Midlothian to put United into the lead with a 25-yard strike. United were relegated to the Scottish Championship at the end of the season. In June 2016, he left United by mutual agreement with the club.

=== St Johnstone ===
After leaving Dundee United, Paton signed a two-year contract with St Johnstone. Paton was released from his contract with St Johnstone on 31 January 2018.

=== Plymouth Argyle ===
Paton signed for English EFL League One club Plymouth Argyle in March 2018.

=== Return to Scotland ===
Paton signed a two-year contract with Scottish Championship club Falkirk in June 2018. After one season with Falkirk, Paton signed for rivals Dunfermline Athletic on 14 June 2019. Paton, who was appointed captain of the club, was released in May 2020 at the end of his contract. On 8 July 2020, Paton joined Lowland League side East Kilbride. With the Lowland League season suspended due to the COVID-19 pandemic, Paton joined League One club Airdrieonians on loan in March 2021, until the end of the 2020–21 season. After turning down a new deal at East Kilbride, Paton joined Dumbarton in June 2021. His first Sons goal was an injury time equaliser against former club Airdrieonians at a time where Dumbarton had just eight men, in a game they eventually lost 3-2. He left the club at the end of the 2021–22 season following the Sons' relegation to Scottish League Two. In June 2022, Paton signed for Glenafton Athletic of the West of Scotland Football League.

== International career ==
On 1 March 2014, Paton was called up to the full Northern Ireland squad for their friendly international against Cyprus. He qualifies to play for Northern Ireland through his father, who was born in Larne.

== Personal life ==
In October 2014, Paton was arrested in connection with an alleged assault on Celtic goalkeeper Lukasz Zaluska along with former Stenhousemuir goalkeeper Chris McCluskey. Two Dundee United players, Paton and Mark Wilson, had been dropped from the team pending a club investigation. Paton was subsequently charged with assaulting Zaluska. He later pleaded guilty on one charge of assault and was fined £500.

== Career statistics ==
As of 08:14, 8 May 2022 (UTC)

Appearances and goals by club, season and competition
Club	Season	League			Scottish Cup		League Cup		Other		Total	
Club	Season	Division	Apps	Goals	Apps	Goals	Apps	Goals	Apps	Goals	Apps	Goals
Queen's Park	2005–06	Scottish Third Division	23	0	2	0	0	0	0	0	25	0
Queen's Park	2006–07	Scottish Third Division	31	1	2	0	3	0	6 (Note: Two appearances and a goal in the Scottish Challenge Cup; four appearances and a goal in the Second Division play-offs) (Note: Includes 1 play-off match not recorded on Soccerbase "Queen's Park 4–2 East Fife". BBC Sport. 9 May 2007.)	2	42	3
Queen's Park	2007–08	Scottish Second Division	34	0	2	0	2	0	2 (Note: Appearances in the Scottish Challenge Cup)	0	40	0
Queen's Park	Total		88	1	6	0	5	0	8	2	107	3
Partick Thistle	2008–09	Scottish First Division	35	3	2	0	2	0	4 (Note: Includes 3 Scottish Challenge Cup matches not recorded on Soccerbase. "Partick Thistle 2–1 Queen's Park". BBC Sport. 26 July 2008., "Partick Thistle 4–2 Peterhead". BBC Sport. 12 August 2008. & "Livingston 0–2 Partick Thistle". BBC Sport. 7 September 2008.)	0	43	3
Partick Thistle	2009–10	Scottish First Division	29	1	1	0	2	0	3	0	35	1
Partick Thistle	2010–11	Scottish First Division	26	1	4	0	2	0	4	0	36	1
Partick Thistle	2011–12	Scottish First Division	33	0	3	0	1	0	2	0	39	0
Partick Thistle	2012–13	Scottish First Division	24	0	1	0	1	0	4	0	30	0
Partick Thistle	Total		147	5	11	0	8	0	17	0	183	5
Dundee United	2013–14	Scottish Premiership	37	2	5	0	3	0	—		45	2
Dundee United	2014–15	Scottish Premiership	24	2	4	0	4	0	—		32	2
Dundee United	2015–16	Scottish Premiership	14	2	4	0	0	0	—		18	2
Dundee United	Total		75	6	13	0	7	0	0	0	95	6
St Johnstone	2016–17	Scottish Premiership	28	1	0	0	6	0	—		34	1
St Johnstone	2017–18	Scottish Premiership	17	0	1	0	0	0	1 (Note: Appearance in the Europa League)	0	19	0
St Johnstone	Total		45	1	1	0	6	0	1	0	53	1
Plymouth Argyle	2017–18	EFL League One	3	0	0	0	0	0	0	0	3	0
Falkirk	2018–19	Scottish Championship	29	1	1	1	3	0	2	0	35	2
Dunfermline Athletic	2019–20	Scottish Championship	24	0	1	0	5	0	1	0	31	0
Airdrieonians (loan)	2020–21	Scottish League One	6	0	0	0	0	0	2	0	8	0
Dumbarton	2021–22	Scottish League One	22	3	1	0	0	0	3	0	26	3
Career total			439	17	34	1	34	0	34	2	541	20
