= Jonathan Lindsay =

Scottish footballer (born 1992)

Johnny Lindsay
Personal information
- Date of birth: 16 October 1992 (age 34)
- Place of birth: Bellshill, Scotland
- Position: Defender

Team information
- Current team: Arbroath

Youth career
- Hibernian
- St Johnstone

Senior career*
Years	Team	Apps	(Gls)
2009–2011	St Johnstone	1	(0)
2011	→ Dumbarton (loan)	2	(0)
2011–2012	Partick Thistle	2	(0)
2012	→ Brechin (loan)	9	(0)
2012–2013	Stalybridge Celtic	?	(?)
2013–	Arbroath	5	(0)
- * Club domestic league appearances and goals as of 18:22, 8 October 2013 (UTC)

Jonathan Lindsay (born 16 October 1992 in Bellshill, Scotland) is a professional footballer who plays for Larkhall Thistle.

== Career ==
Lindsay began his career with St Johnstone where he made his debut aged just sixteen before being sent out on loan to Dumbarton.

=== Dumbarton (loan) ===
In January 2011 Lindsay was sent out on an emergency loan to Dumbarton. The abandonment of matches due to poor weather led to him staying for an extra month. Due to this he only made two appearances for Dumbarton.

=== Partick Thistle ===
On 26 May 2011 after being freed by St Johnstone Lindsay joined Partick Thistle on a two-year contract, becoming the first signing made by new manager Jackie McNamara. On 9 August 2011 he made his debut against Hamilton in the Challenge Cup.

=== Stalybridge Celtic ===
Lindsay joined Stalybridge Celtic for the 2012–13 season.

== Career statistics ==
As of 21 August 2011

Club statistics
Club	Season	League		Scottish Cup		League Cup		Other		Total	
Club	Season	App	Goals	App	Goals	App	Goals	App	Goals	App	Goals
Dumbarton	2010–11 season	2	0	0	0	0	0	0	0	2	0
Partick Thistle	2011–12 season	1	0	0	0	0	0	1	0	2	0
Total		3	0	0	0	0	0	1	0	4	0
