= Craig Hinchliffe =

Scottish association football player

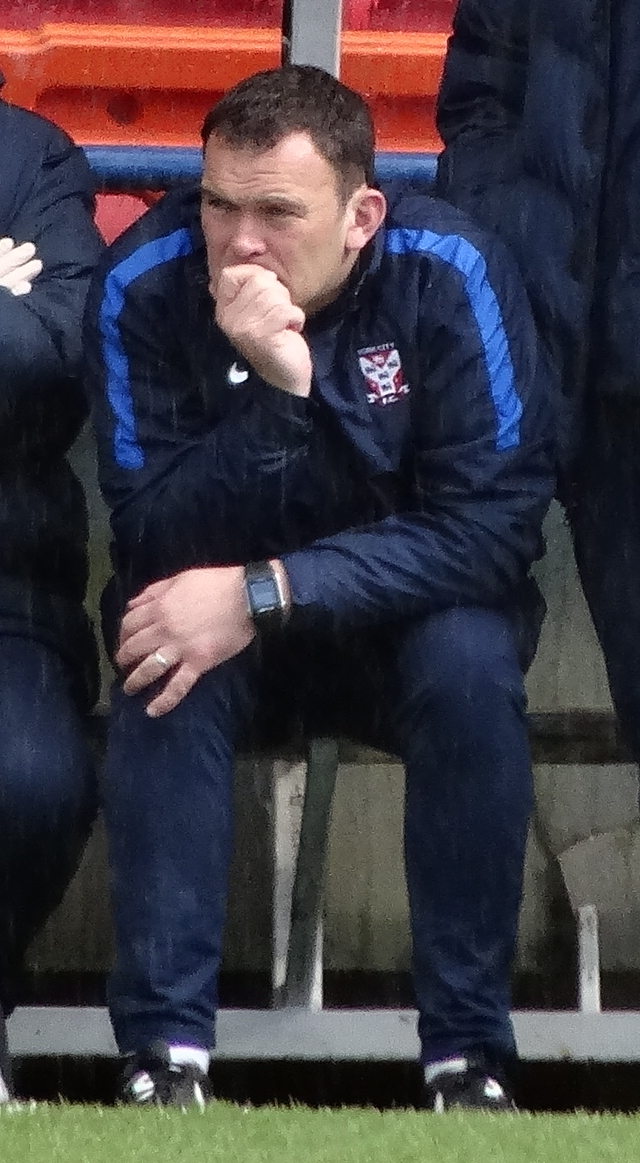
- Hinchliffe with York City in 2016

Personal information
- Full name: Craig Peter Hinchliffe
- Date of birth: 5 May 1972 (age 54)
- Place of birth: Glasgow, Scotland
- Position: Goalkeeper

Team information
- Current team: Aberdeen (goalkeeping coach)

Senior career*
Years	Team	Apps	(Gls)
1991–1992	Albion Rovers	1	(0)
1992–1995	Elgin City	104	(0)
1995–2003	Arbroath	164	(0)
2003–2007	St Mirren	65	(0)
2007	→ Queen of the South (loan)	5	(0)
2007–2013	Partick Thistle	13	(0)
- * Club domestic league appearances and goals

Craig Hinchliffe (born 5 May 1972) is a Scottish former professional footballer who played as a goalkeeper. He is currently the goalkeeping coach at Aberdeen.

== Playing career ==
Hinchliffe made one Scottish Football League (SFL) appearance for Albion Rovers in the 1991/92 season, before moving to Highland League club Elgin City. In 1995, he moved back into the SFL with Arbroath, where he made nearly 200 appearances for the club. In the summer of 2003 he transferred to St Mirren and made 70 appearances, including several in their promotion season in 2005–06. In the 2006–07 season, he played a handful of games for Queen of the South during a loan spell at the Dumfries club.

In the summer of 2007, he signed for Partick Thistle as goalkeeper and goalkeeper coach. Thistle's manager, Ian McCall, had also signed Hinchliffe (on loan) for Queen of the South. He was released at the end of the 2009/10 season but rejoined in a player-coach role in time for the 2010/11 season.

== Coaching career ==
In April 2011, Hinchliffe continued his role under the new management team of Jackie McNamara and Simon Donnelly. McNamara and Donnelly left Partick Thistle in January 2013, with the club sitting in 2nd place, to join Dundee United. Hinchliffe worked closely with new caretaker manager Alan Archibald. Archibald later guided Thistle to the Championship gaining the Jags promotion to the Scottish Premiership with a 16-game unbeaten run. Despite Thistle's attempts to secure Hinchliffe's services he opted to rejoin Jackie McNamara and Simon Donnelly at Dundee United, signing a three-year deal in time for season 2013–2014. Hinchliffe left Dundee United in September 2015, following McNamara's departure. In November 2015 he was appointed as goalkeeping coach at Airdrieonians, but a month later reunited with McNamara at League Two club York City. Returning to Scotland, he became goalkeeping coach at Motherwell in June 2017. On 13 May, after 5 successful seasons at Motherwell working with Trevor Carson, Mark Gillespie and Liam Kelly, Hinchliffe returned to Dundee Utd for a second spell under Thomas Courts. Before the 22/23 SPFL season began Courts left the club. On June 21 2023, he was announced as St Johnstone's

On June 24 2024 he signed for Aberdeen F.C. as goalkeeper coach.

== Honours ==
St Mirren

- Scottish Challenge Cup: 2005–06
