= Shaun Vipond =

English footballer

Personal information
- Full name: Shaun David Vipond
- Date of birth: 25 December 1988 (age 37)
- Place of birth: Hexham, England
- Position: Midfielder

Team information
- Current team: West Auckland Town

Senior career*
Years	Team	Apps	(Gls)
2006–2008	Carlisle United	4	(0)
2008	→ Workington (loan)	15	(3)
2008–2009	Workington	16	(0)
2009	Östersunds FK	3	(0)
2009–2011	Workington	75	(6)
2011–2013	Blyth Spartans	4	(0)
2013–	West Auckland Town		
- * Club domestic league appearances and goals as of 18:02, 10 February 2012 (UTC)

Shaun David Vipond (born 25 December 1988, in Hexham), is an English footballer who plays as a midfielder for West Auckland Town.

== Biography ==
Vipond started a youth team player at Carlisle United, where he progressed through their ranks and onto the first team stage. He was given the squad number 24 after being named to the substitutes bench in the 5–0 defeat against Swansea City on 10 December 2006, He made his Football League debut as a stoppage time substitute in the 2–0 defeat by Millwall on 10 March 2007. Vipond signed a two-year professional contract in May 2007 after breaking into the Brunton Park first team. making his first start in the league on 5 May 2007 in the 3–0 loss against Scunthorpe United at Glanford Park. Leeds United were reported to have bid £100,000 at the end of the season in 2007, but no move came about. He was loaned to Workington for three months in 2008. After being released by Carlisle, he signed for Workington on a permanent basis on 21 November 2008.

In 2009, he moved to the Swedish club Östersunds FK. He played three matches before a bad shoulder injury ended his time there.

In January 2010, Shaun scored the winning goal as Workington defeated Conference National side AFC Wimbledon in the 3rd Round of the FA Trophy.

In June 2011 he signed for Blyth Spartans. Unfortunately not long after Shaun suffered leg break which kept him out for the rest of the season. Unfortunately Shaun was never the same player after and was released by Blyth later the following season. He joined West Auckland Town in February 2013.

Shaun is now an apprentice electrician for Garwen Enterprises and works at Egger UK.
