= Jamie Campbell (Scottish footballer) =

Scottish footballer

Personal information
- Date of birth: 24 March 1992 (age 34)
- Place of birth: Scotland
- Positions: Defender; midfielder

Senior career*
Years	Team	Apps	(Gls)
2009–2013	Partick Thistle	19	(1)
2012	→ Stenhousemuir (loan)	7	(1)
2013	→ Stranraer (loan)	10	(0)
2013–2015	Clydebank	42	(16)
2015–	Greenock Juniors	24	(9)
2017–2018	Largs Thistle	19	(1)
- * Club domestic league appearances and goals as of 19:45, 1 July 2018 (UTC)

Jamie Campbell (born 24 March 1992) is a Scottish footballer who plays as a midfielder. He has previously played in the Scottish First Division with Partick Thistle, and in the Scottish Second Division during loan spells with both Stenhousemuir and Stranraer.

== Career ==
Having been part of the Partick Thistle youth set-up, he was signed in 2009 on the Modern Apprentice scheme. Making his first team debut as a substitute in the Scottish Cup on 20 November 2010 against Stirling Albion. Going on to score his first ever professional goal during a 6–1 home win against Stirling Albion on 15 January 2011. Jamie's contract was not renewed after 2013 and he made the choice to drop down to Junior football and play for Clydebank. He has also began a career as an officer in the Merchant Navy. After two years with Clydebank he transferred to his hometown team, Greenock Juniors. He spent the 2017–18 season with West of Scotland First Division club Largs Thistle.

== Career statistics ==
As of 21 August 2011

Appearances and goals by club, season and competition
Club	Season	League			Scottish Cup		League Cup		Other		Total	
Club	Season	Division	Apps	Goals	Apps	Goals	Apps	Goals	Apps	Goals	Apps	Goals
Partick Thistle	2010–11	Scottish First Division	12	1	0	0	0	0	2	0	14	0
Partick Thistle	2011–12	Scottish First Division	2	0	0	0	1	0	1	0	4	0
Career total			14	1	0	0	1	0	3	0	18	0
