= David Beattie (businessman) =

Scottish business executive (born 1955)

- Born: 1955 (age 70–71); Whiteinch, Glasgow, Scotland
- Occupations: Entrepreneur, business executive, ex -chairman of Partick Thistle F.C.

David Beattie (born 1955) is a British business executive who was the founder of Enterprise Foods Ltd and was previously chairman of Scottish Championship football club Partick Thistle.

== Early life ==
Born in Whiteinch in 1955, David's father (a Partick born-man) was determined that his son would be the new striker for Thistle. However a footballing career never came into fruition. Educated in Linwood, he achieved very little academically but has always harboured a determination to succeed at whatever he turned his hand to.

== Career ==
In the course of the last 30 years, he started and sold a number of companies in the food & drink industry, most recently creating the Enterprise Food Group Ltd in 1995 from the basement of his house.

He grew the company from a zero start to a position where it was employing over 500 people within the bakery sector, supplying supermarkets with cakes and related products and, in 2005, he sold the manufacturing arm of the company.

== Partick Thistle ==
He was formally the chairman of his boyhood team Partick Thistle. As director, he helped the club see off a debt of around £3 million and, along with a managerial team of Alan Archibald and Scott Paterson, led Thistle into the 2013–14 Scottish Premiership. He also introduced the club's popular under-16s go free to Firhill scheme along with the then manager Ian McCall.

In July 2019, Beattie returned to the club after the dismissal of the incumbent board led by Jacqui Low after a poor domestic season in the Scottish Championship and allegations of poor financial management. He will form a new executive board for the 2019–20 season.

In March 2024, Beattie has joined Ayr Rugby Football Club as a Director and Trustee.

== Personal life ==
Following taking over as chairman of Thistle, Beattie was diagnosed with throat cancer. He stated that the club and the fans saw him through the cancer, which is now in remission. He is divorced and has 3 children. He now lives in Alloway with his partner. In 1991, Beattie was team captain on an episode of Channel 4's The Crystal Maze.
