= Andy Gibson (footballer, born 1982) =

Scottish footballer

Personal information
- Date of birth: 2 March 1982 (age 44)
- Place of birth: Glasgow, Scotland
- Position: Midfielder

Youth career
- 1999–2002: Partick Thistle

Senior career*
Years	Team	Apps	(Gls)
2002–2005	Partick Thistle	44	(0)
2003–2004	→ Stirling Albion (loan)	16	(1)
2004–2005	→ Stirling Albion (loan)	7	(0)
2005–2006	Stenhousemuir	9	(1)
2006	Stirling Albion	3	(0)
2007–2009	Stranraer	72	(8)
2009–2012	Stirling Albion	54	(2)
- Glasgow Perthshire
Total		205	(12)
- * Club domestic league appearances and goals

Andy Gibson (born 2 March 1982) is a Scottish footballer, who played for Partick Thistle, Stirling Albion, Stenhousemuir and Stranraer.
