= Shaun Fraser =

Scottish footballer

Personal information
- Full name: Shaun Fraser
- Date of birth: 6 March 1988 (age 38)
- Place of birth: Glasgow, Scotland
- Position: Forward

Team information
- Current team: Pollok

Senior career*
Years	Team	Apps	(Gls)
2010–2012	Partick Thistle	14	(2)
2011	→ Stenhousemuir (loan)	3	(0)
2013–2014	Irvine Meadow XI	–	(–)
2014–2015	Queen's Park	31	(7)
2015–2016	Irvine Meadow XI	–	(1)
2016-2018	Kirkintilloch Rob Roy		
2018-	Pollok	79	(21)
- * Club domestic league appearances and goals as of 11 August 2012 ‡ National team caps and goals as of 14 August 2011

Shaun Fraser (born 6 March 1988) is a Scottish professional footballer for Pollok in the West of Scotland Super League Premier Division.

== Career ==
=== Partick Thistle ===
A member of Thistle's under 19 squad that won the SFL Youth Cup in May 2010, Fraser was given his first professional contract until May 2013. On 11 January 2011 he made his first team debut in the Scottish Cup as a substitute against Falkirk at the Falkirk Stadium. On 15 January he scored his first goal for the club against Stirling Albion. In all he made 17 appearances scoring twice before being loaned out to Stenhousemuir at the start of the next season.

On 19 August 2011 Fraser joined Stenhousemuir on loan until January 2012. Making his debut the following day as a substitute against Forfar Athletic.

=== Junior career ===
Fraser left Partick Thistle in 2012. He had two spells at West of Scotland Super League Premier Division side Irvine Meadow XI, his first spell at the North Ayrshire club was during 2013/14 which came before a season at Queen's Park of Scottish League Two.

=== Pollok ===
Fraser joined Pollok on an initial one-year deal from Kirkintilloch Rob Roy in 2018, making a goalscoring debut in September of that year in a 2–1 home defeat to Auchinleck Talbot. At the end of the 2019–20 season, curtailed due to the COVID-19 pandemic, he was named Members' Player of the Year and Players' Player of the year, having finished the season as the club's top scorer. At the end of the 2021–22 season, Fraser signed a one-year extension with the club, and played a key role in the club's run to the third round of the Scottish Cup. He started the matches against Huntly, Annan Athletic and Ayr United, opening the scoring against Annan with a looping header in front of the BBC cameras.
