= Simon Donnelly =

Scottish footballer (born 1974)

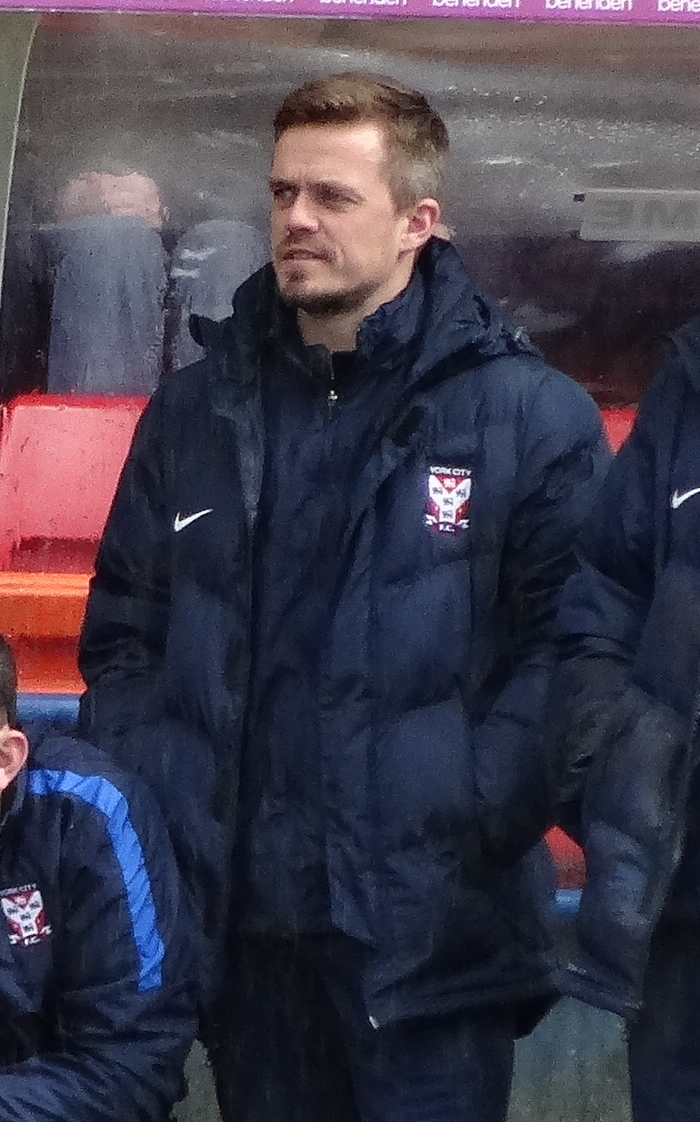
- Donnelly in 2016

Personal information
- Full name: Simon Thomas Donnelly
- Date of birth: 1 December 1974 (age 51)
- Place of birth: Glasgow, Scotland
- Height: 5 ft 9 in (1.75 m)
- Positions: Striker; midfielder

Senior career*
Years	Team	Apps	(Gls)
1992–1993	Queen's Park	0	(0)
1993–1999	Celtic	146	(30)
1999–2003	Sheffield Wednesday	53	(8)
2003–2004	St Johnstone	36	(8)
2004–2006	Dunfermline Athletic	39	(4)
2006–2011	Partick Thistle	122	(14)
Total		396	(64)

International career
1994–1996	Scotland U21	11	(3)
1997–1998	Scotland	10	(0)
- * Club domestic league appearances and goals

Simon Thomas Donnelly (born 1 December 1974) is a Scottish professional football coach and former player. He played as a forward or wide midfielder for Queen's Park, Celtic, Sheffield Wednesday, St Johnstone, Dunfermline Athletic, Partick Thistle and Scotland.

He established himself at Celtic, winning the Scottish League title in 1997–98 and being a member of the Scotland squad at the 1998 FIFA World Cup. In 1999 he moved to English football with Sheffield Wednesday, but struggled with injuries in his time there. Returning to Scotland, he played for St Johnstone, Dunfermline and Partick Thistle before his playing retirement in 2011.

He has since moved into coaching, acting as assistant manager to Jackie McNamara at Partick Thistle, Dundee United and York City, and Mark Wilson at Brechin City.

== Club career ==
A wide forward, Donnelly started his career at Queen's Park but left in 1993 to join Celtic. He made his league debut towards the end of the 1993–94 season, appearing as a substitute in a 0–0 draw against Hibernian. Playing in the majority of matches from March onwards, Donnelly scored five league goals in 12 appearances. He failed to improve on this tally in the following season as he did not score in 17 outings, although the team reached both domestic cup finals, and he was part of Celtic's Scottish Cup-winning side. In the 1995–96 season, Donnelly became a regular, missing only one league match and scoring six goals, and featured in the majority of the 1996–97 campaign.

The 1997–98 season saw Donnelly's best return of goals, scoring 10 goals in 30 league matches as Celtic won the Scottish Premier Division and Scottish League Cup. The following season, he scored five goals in 23 appearances in what was his final year at Celtic Park. In July 1999, Donnelly – along with Phil O'Donnell – joined Sheffield Wednesday on a Bosman free transfer.

Donnelly's time at Wednesday was interrupted by a series of injuries and he played only a dozen matches in the Premier League that season, scoring once as Wednesday were relegated. The following season, he featured in just three matches, although he played in 23 games in the 2001–02 season. In his final season at Hillsborough, Donnelly scored two goals in fifteen league matches before being released.

Joining Coventry City on trial, Donnelly instead returned to Scotland with St Johnstone, signing a one-year deal in August 2003. Surprisingly, given his injury history, he featured in every league match of that season, scoring eight goals before signing for Dunfermline Athletic in July. During his time at East End Park, his injuries returned and he was released two years later having made fewer than 40 league appearances.

He joined Partick Thistle in June 2006 and played regularly for three seasons. He was initially released at the end of the 2008–09 season, and made a substitute appearance for Greenock Morton in a friendly against Oxford United. However, following the departure of Partick coach John Henry to Burnley, Donnelly rejoined the Jags as a player-coach, scoring against Morton in a 2–0 win at Cappielow later that season. In a similar pattern, Donnelly was then released by Partick again at the end of the 2009–10 season, but soon re-signed once more on a one-year contract. In 2011 he ceased playing but continued at the club as a coach after his friend and teammate Jackie McNamara was appointed manager.

== International career ==
At end of the 1996–97 season, Donnelly made his Scotland debut, making substitute appearances in the friendly matches against Wales and Malta. The following season Donnelly also featured regularly for Scotland, playing in a number of friendlies ahead of the 1998 World Cup, although he failed to make an appearance during the tournament. Donnelly won ten Scotland caps during his career, and had played for Scotland under-21 before appearing for the senior side.

== Coaching career ==
On 30 January 2013, Donnelly left Partick Thistle and joined Dundee United as assistant manager, accompanying Jackie McNamara who had been appointed manager. He left Dundee United in September 2015, following McNamara's departure.

Donnelly was announced as York City's assistant manager two months later, following McNamara to Bootham Crescent. After McNamara's resignation as manager and appointment as chief executive, Donnelly left the club on 16 October 2016.

In September 2020, Donnelly landed the assistant manager's job at Scottish side Brechin City, working with another former Celtic player, Mark Wilson. Donnelly and Wilson were sacked by Brechin in October 2020.

== Personal life ==
Donnelly grew up in Burnside, Rutherglen, and attended Stonelaw High School. His father, Tom, was also a footballer who failed to break into the team at Rangers in the late 1960s but played for Motherwell and East Stirlingshire over the next decade before becoming a school teacher.

== Career statistics ==
As of 7 June 2011

Appearances and goals by club, season and competition
Club	Season	League			National cup		League cup		Other (Note: Includes the UEFA Champions League, UEFA Cup and Scottish Challenge Cup)		Total	
Club	Season	Division	Apps	Goals	Apps	Goals	Apps	Goals	Apps	Goals	Apps	Goals
Celtic	1993–94	Scottish Premier Division	12	4	0	0	0	0	0	0	12	4
Celtic	1994–95	Scottish Premier Division	17	0	2	0	5	0	0	0	24	0
Celtic	1995–96	Scottish Premier Division	35	6	4	1	3	1	4	2	46	10
Celtic	1996–97	Scottish Premier Division	29	5	2	0	3	0	2	0	36	5
Celtic	1997–98	Scottish Premier Division	30	10	3	0	5	3	6	3	44	16
Celtic	1998–99	Scottish Premier League	23	5	2	0	1	0	7	1	43	6
Celtic	Total		146	30	13	1	17	4	19	6	195	41
Sheffield Wednesday	1999–2000	Premier League	12	1	3	0	3	0	0	0	18	1
Sheffield Wednesday	2000–01	First Division	3	1	0	0	0	0	0	0	3	1
Sheffield Wednesday	2001–02	First Division	23	4	0	0	2	0	0	0	25	4
Sheffield Wednesday	2002–03	First Division	15	2	0	0	1	0	0	0	16	2
Sheffield Wednesday	Total		53	8	3	0	6	0	0	0	62	8
St Johnstone	2003–04	Scottish First Division	36	8	1	0	4	2	2	1	43	11
Dunfermline Athletic	2004–05	Scottish Premier League	21	3	0	0	1	0	1	0	23	3
Dunfermline Athletic	2005–06	Scottish Premier League	13	1	0	0	2	0	0	0	15	1
Dunfermline Athletic	Total		39	4	0	0	3	0	1	0	43	4
Partick Thistle	2006–07	Scottish First Division	24	4	1	0	2	0	1	0	28	4
Partick Thistle	2007–08	Scottish First Division	18	1	5	0	2	0	0	0	25	1
Partick Thistle	2008–09	Scottish First Division	31	1	2	0	3	0	2	1	38	2
Partick Thistle	2009–10	Scottish First Division	35	8	1	0	2	1	1	1	39	10
Partick Thistle	2010–11	Scottish First Division	14	0	2	0	1	0	0	0	17	0
Partick Thistle	Total		122	14	11	0	10	1	4	2	147	17
Career total			396	64	28	1	40	7	26	9	490	81

== Honours ==
Celtic

- Scottish Premier Division: 1997–98
- Scottish Cup: 1994–95
- Scottish League Cup: 1997–98; runner-up: 1994–95
