= Bryan Hodge =

Scottish footballer

Personal information
- Full name: Bryan Johnstone Hodge
- Date of birth: 23 September 1987 (age 39)
- Place of birth: Hamilton, Scotland
- Height: 5 ft 11 in (1.80 m)
- Position: Midfielder

Youth career
- –2004: Blackburn Rovers

Senior career*
| Years | Team | Apps | (Gls) |
| 2004–2009 | Blackburn Rovers | 0 | (0) |
| 2007 | → Mansfield Town (loan) | 9 | (0) |
| 2007–2008 | → Millwall (loan) | 10 | (0) |
| 2008 | → Darlington (loan) | 7 | (0) |
| 2009–2011 | Partick Thistle | 45 | (3) |
| 2011 | Greenock Morton (trial) | 0 | (0) |
| 2011–2012 | Brechin City | 25 | (2) |
| 2012–2015 | Stenhousemuir | 85 | (6) |
| 2015–2016 | Forfar Athletic | 28 | (6) |
| 2016 | Stirling Albion | 11 | (0) |
| 2017 | Arbroath | 14 | (0) |
| Total | | 234 | (17) |

International career
- Scotland U17
- Scotland U18
- Scotland U19
| 2007 | Scotland U20 | 2 | (0) |
- * Club domestic league appearances and goals

Bryan Johnstone Hodge (born 23 September 1987) is a Scottish former footballer.

Hodge is a versatile midfielder who has represented Scotland at under-17, under-18, under-19 and under-20 levels. He started his career at Blackburn Rovers and in his time there had loan spells at Mansfield Town, Millwall and Darlington. He then returned to Scotland, signing for Partick Thistle, and from there moved to Brechin City and then Stenhousemuir. Hodge signed a pre-contract agreement to sign for Forfar Athletic in the summer of 2015, where he stayed for one season before moving to Stirling Albion. Hodge spent just 6 months with Albion, signing for Arbroath in January 2017.

== Career ==
Born in Hamilton, Hodge began his professional footballing career as a trainee with Blackburn Rovers in August 2006. He was loaned to Mansfield Town in late February 2007 in order to gain first-team experience, and made nine appearances before returning to Blackburn in April 2007. He joined Millwall on loan in November 2007, for whom he made 13 league and cup appearances in a two-month spell. He signed a new contract with Blackburn before joining Darlington on loan in February 2008. Hodge made his Blackburn Rovers debut as an 83rd minute substitution for Matt Derbyshire in the FA Cup against Blyth Spartans in January 2009.

On 4 July 2009, Hodge signed a two-year contract with Partick Thistle. In August 2011, Hodge appeared as an unused substitute on the bench, as a trialist, for Greenock Morton in two league games. However, after not being offered a contract at Cappielow, Hodge signed with Second Division side Brechin City.

On 8 June 2012, Hodge signed for Scottish Second Division side Stenhousemuir. At the end of the 2014–15 season, Hodge left The Warriors, after signing a pre-contract agreement with Forfar Athletic, joining the Station Park side at the end of the 2014–15 season.

After one year with Forfar, which saw the side relegated to Scottish League Two, Hodge signed for fellow League Two club Stirling Albion in May 2016. Hodge left Stirling Albion after 6 months with the side, signing for Arbroath on 1 January 2017.

== Representative honours ==
Hodge has represented Scotland at under-17, under-18, under-19 and under-20 levels.

== Honours ==
Arbroath

- Scottish League Two : 2016–17
