= Paul Cairney =

Scottish footballer (born 1987)

Personal information
- Date of birth: 29 August 1987 (age 39)
- Place of birth: Glasgow, Scotland
- Position: Midfielder

Youth career
- 2003–2005: St Mirren

Senior career*
Years	Team	Apps	(Gls)
2005–2008	Queen's Park	56	(8)
2008–2012	Partick Thistle	96	(18)
2008–2009	→ Queen's Park (loan)	33	(8)
2012–2014	Hibernian	47	(3)
2014–2015	Kilmarnock	16	(0)
2015–2016	Stranraer	35	(0)
2016–2017	Ayr United	30	(5)
2017–2018	Peterhead	34	(1)
2020–2021	Albion Rovers	1	(0)
- * Club domestic league appearances and goals

Paul Cairney (born 29 August 1987) is a Scottish footballer, who plays as a midfielder.

Cairney has previously played for Queen's Park, Partick Thistle, Hibernian, Kilmarnock, Stranraer, Ayr United, Peterhead and Albion Rovers.

== Career ==
Born in Glasgow, Cairney was registered with St Mirren as a youth player, but was released by the club aged 17. He then signed for amateur club Queen's Park and made his first senior appearance in December 2005. He began to play more frequently for the Spiders in the 2006–07 season and helped the club win promotion to the Second Division.

Cairney signed a three-year deal with Partick Thistle in 2008, but was loaned back to Queen's Park for six months. This loan was subsequently extended in January to the end of the 2008–09 season.

Cairney made his debut for Thistle in a Scottish Challenge Cup tie against Airdrie United, coming on as a substitute. His full and home debut came against Berwick Rangers in the Scottish League Cup. Cairney scored 12 goals for Thistle during the 2011–12 season, including a hat-trick in a 3–0 win against Dundee. He was nominated for player of the year in the 2011–12 Scottish First Division.

Cairney signed a two-year contract with Hibernian in July 2012. He scored his first goal for the club on 1 September, in a 2–2 draw against Celtic. Cairney struggled to consistently hold a place in the Hibernian first team due to injuries. He was released by the club at the end of the 2013–14 season.

Cairney signed a two-year contract with Kilmarnock in June 2014. After being released by Kilmarnock, Cairney signed for Scottish League One side Stranraer in July 2015, and after one season with the club, signed for recently promoted Ayr United. Cairney signed for Peterhead in July 2017. He left Peterhead after one season.

After two years out of football, Cairney signed for Albion Rovers in July 2020.

== Career statistics ==
As of 29 May 2016

Appearances and goals by club, season and competition
Club	Season	League			Cup		League Cup		Other		Total	
Club	Season	Division	App	Goals	App	Goals	App	Goals	App	Goals	App	Goals
Queen's Park	2005–06	Third Division	1	0	0	0	0	0	0	0	1	0
Queen's Park	2006–07	Third Division	20	1	0	0	0	0	4	1	24	2
Queen's Park	2007–08	Second Division	35	7	2	0	2	0	2	0	41	7
Queen's Park	Total		56	8	2	0	2	0	6	1	66	9
Partick Thistle	2008–09	First Division	0	0	0	0	0	0	0	0	0	0
Partick Thistle	2009–10	First Division	32	7	1	0	2	0	3	1	38	8
Partick Thistle	2010–11	First Division	29	0	4	1	2	0	2	1	37	2
Partick Thistle	2011–12	First Division	35	11	3	3	1	1	1	0	40	15
Partick Thistle	Total		96	18	8	4	5	1	6	2	115	25
Queen's Park (loan)	2008–09	Second Division	33	8	3	2	1	0	2	0	39	10
Hibernian	2012–13	Premier League	29	2	3	0	1	0	0	0	33	2
Hibernian	2013–14	Premiership	18	1	1	0	0	0	1	0	20	1
Hibernian	Total		47	3	4	0	1	0	1	0	53	3
Kilmarnock	2014–15	Premiership	16	0	0	0	0	0	0	0	16	0
Stranraer	2015–16	League One	35	0	2	0	1	0	5	1	43	1
Ayr United	2016–17	Championship	30	5	4	1	5	0	3	0	42	6
Peterhead	2017–18	League Two	34	1	0	0	4	1	0	0	38	2
Career total			318	43	23	7	19	2	22	4	382	55
