= Ryan MacBeth =

Scottish footballer

Personal information
- Date of birth: 29 April 1991 (age 35)
- Place of birth: Scotland
- Position: Midfielder

Team information
- Current team: Pollok

Senior career*
Years	Team	Apps	(Gls)
2008–2012	Partick Thistle	4	(0)
2011	→ Clyde (loan)	5	(0)
2012–2014	Clyde	16	(0)
2014–	Pollok		
- * Club domestic league appearances and goals as of 17:23, 1 September 2014 (UTC)

Ryan MacBeth (born 29 April 1991) is a Scottish football midfielder who plays for Scottish Junior club Pollok.

== Career ==
Having been part of the Partick Thistle youth set-up, he was signed at the start of the 2008-09 season on the Modern Apprentice scheme. He made his first team début against Stirling Albion at Forthbank, coming on as a substitute for Alan Archibald in the second half of the Third Round Scottish Cup match on Saturday 29 November 2008.

In February 2011, he joined Clyde on loan for a month. He was released by Partick Thistle in March 2012.

MacBeth signed for Clyde on a permanent deal on 27 June 2012 and made his début starting the second half in the 2–1 win over Annan Athletic at Broadwood. He was released by Clyde at the end of the 2013–14 season.

In August 2014, MacBeth signed for Junior club Pollok.
