= Alan Archibald =

Scottish footballer & coach

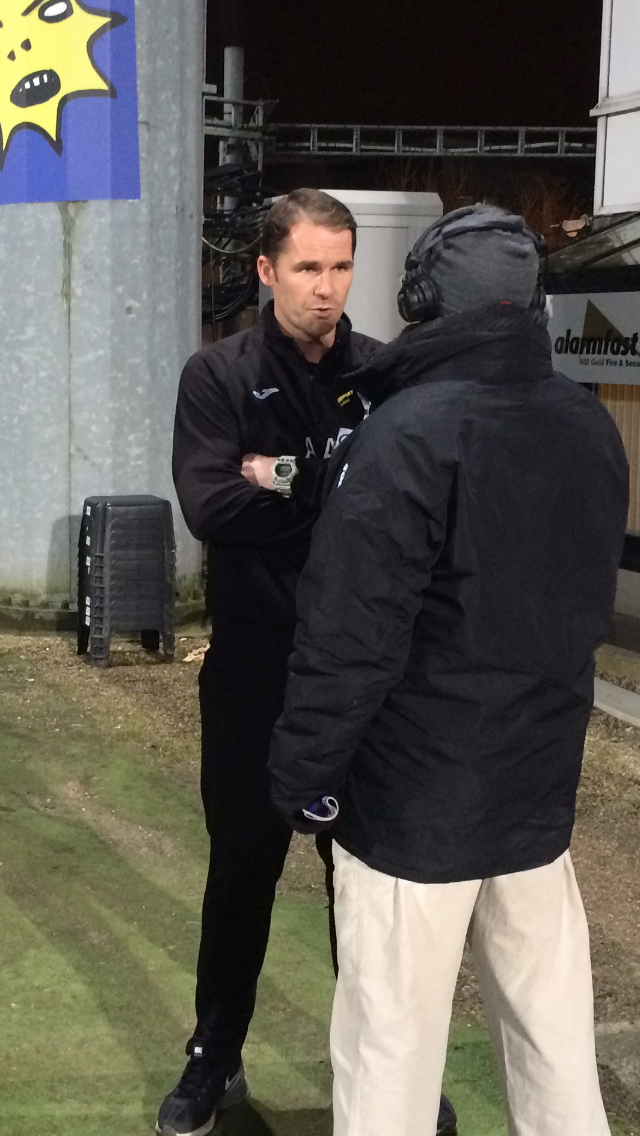
- Archibald (left) is interviewed by Chick Young of BBC Radio Scotland.

Personal information
- Full name: Alan Maxwell Archibald
- Date of birth: 13 December 1977 (age 48)
- Place of birth: Glasgow, Scotland
- Position: Centre-back

Team information
- Current team: Rangers FC (Assistant Coach)

Youth career
- 1994–1996: Partick Thistle

Senior career*
Years	Team	Apps	(Gls)
1996–2003	Partick Thistle	200	(8)
2003–2007	Dundee United	125	(6)
2007–2013	Partick Thistle	159	(1)
Total		484	(15)

International career
1998–1999	Scotland U21	5	(0)

Managerial career
- 2013–2018: Partick Thistle
- 2019–2023: Partick Thistle (Assistant)
- 2023–2025: Kilmarnock (Assistant)
- 2025–2026: Heart of Midlothian (Assistant)
- 2026–: Rangers (Assistant)
- * Club domestic league appearances and goals

Alan Archibald (born 13 December 1977) is a Scottish football coach and former player, who is currently assistant coach at Rangers. Archibald, who played as a defender, has been associated with Partick Thistle for most of his career. Beginning his professional career with the club as a teenager, he went on to make 423 appearances for Thistle in two spells, placing him tenth on the club's all-time list of most appearances. His only other professional club was Dundee United, where he played between 2003 and 2007 before rejoining Thistle. Archibald also played five times for the Scotland national under-21 team.

Following his retirement from playing, Archibald became Partick Thistle manager in 2013 and went on to win the Scottish Football League First Division title that year. Thistle stayed in the top flight for four seasons under Archibald, but the club were relegated in 2018, he was kept on as manager despite relegation but on 6 October 2018 he was sacked as manager after a poor start to their Scottish Championship campaign. Archibald returned to Partick Thistle a year later, as assistant manager to Ian McCall. They both left the club in February 2023. In total, as both a player and coach, Archibald has achieved four divisional titles and promotions with Partick Thistle.

== Career ==
=== Partick Thistle ===
Archibald was born in Glasgow. A left-footed defender, he started his professional career with Partick Thistle as an eighteen-year-old. He had arrived at the club in May 1994 but wouldn't go onto become a regular part of the first team for another two years, his development years stuttered somewhat due to the precarious financial situation occurring at Thistle in the 90s. Alan made 231 appearances scoring eight goals during this period with the Jags where, until leaving, he was their longest-serving player. During this time he also gained caps as a Scotland U-21 international. As a player in this stint he was a vital part of the side who won two back-to-back titles under gaffer John Lambie, the Scottish Second Division title in 2001, and the Scottish First Division title in 2002, the latter securing promotion to the top flight for the first time since Thistle's relegation in 1995.

=== Dundee United ===
Archibald was signed by then-manager Ian McCall for Dundee United on 3 June 2003. In his first season at Tannadice – 2003–04 – Archibald was the only player to feature in every match for United, and his assured performances earned him a contract extension. Archibald's first United goal came against Hearts in a 2–1 win at Tannadice. He also scored against Celtic in a narrow defeat for the Tangerines at Celtic Park.

Archibald was one of the club's most consistent performers in 2003–04 and his contribution in the side that achieved a fifth-place finish was marked with the Player of the Year award at the club's annual dinner and he also received recognition from the Federation and other supporters' clubs. During the 2004–05 season, Archibald continued his ever-present run by appearing in every match that season as United reached the Scottish Cup Final and secured their place in the SPL following a long battle with relegation. In the Scottish Cup Final Archibald almost scored an injury time equaliser to take the game to extra time when he hit the bar. He also added a further four goals to his United tally, including the opener in the 4–1 Scottish Cup win over Aberdeen at Tannadice.

=== Return to Partick Thistle ===
At the end of the 2005–06 season, it was rumoured that Archibald might be returning to former club Partick Thistle. However, following the signing of fullback Christian Kalvenes early into the 2006–07 season, Archibald was moved to his preferred position in the centre of defence. Up until 26 November 2006, all of Archibald's United appearances had been from the starting eleven; he finally made a substitute appearance in the 1–0 win over St Mirren. On 24 January 2007, Archibald was informed by Dundee United manager Craig Levein that his contract, due to expire in June 2007, would not be renewed.

On 31 January 2007, Archibald signed a contract to return to Partick Thistle, lasting until the end of the 2008–09 season. Although a March 2008 knee injury kept him injured for eight months, he was granted a testimonial season by the club. In September 2009 he scored his first goal for the club in a 3–2 win at Inverness Caledonian Thistle.

== Coaching career ==
=== Partick Thistle ===
On 30 January 2013, he was appointed interim manager with former player Scott Paterson as assistant following the departure of Jackie McNamara to Dundee United. On 22 March, the duo were given the job on a permanent basis signing a one-year rolling contract. Archibald later guided Thistle to the First Division title (now known as the Championship) gaining the Jags promotion to the Scottish Premiership. Thistle also lost the Scottish Challenge Cup final to Queen of the South on penalties in April 2013.

Thistle's performance in the Premiership was mixed. The club went seven months without a win at home. However, the club had more success away from home with a total of six wins. Their run of success near the end of the Premiership season saw them secure their top-flight status for the 2014–15 Scottish Premiership season. After a poor start to the 2015–16 season, the team had a run of success, winning seven from nine points, in which Archibald picked up the Premiership Manager of the Month award for November. Since Jackie McNamara's departure from Dundee United in September 2015, Archibald has been the longest serving current manager at any Premiership club.

On 7 May 2016, Thistle secured their Premiership status with a 2–0 away victory to Kilmarnock, with goals coming from Steven Lawless and Kris Doolan. This result meant that Archibald overtook former manager Davie McParland as the record holder of top-flight victories. On 8 April 2017, Thistle beat Motherwell 1–0 to secure a place in the top six for the first time since the league split was first introduced to the Scottish top flight in 2000–01.

Thistle suffered a poor 2017–18 season, finishing 11th in the Premiership with 33 points. This meant that they went into a promotion/relegation play-off with Livingston, who had finished second in the Championship. Thistle lost 3–1 on aggregate and were relegated, but the Thistle board decided to continue with Archibald as manager for the following season anyway. Following a slow start to the 2018–19 Scottish Championship season, Archibald was sacked on 6 October 2018.

In September 2019, less than a year after his sacking, Archibald returned to Thistle as assistant manager to Ian McCall and after an initial difficult spell, Thistle won the Scottish League One title for 2020–21, Archibald's fourth overall promotion involvement at the club. McCall and his coaching staff were dismissed in February 2023.

After leaving Thistle, Archibald became a lead development coach at Motherwell. In June 2023 he moved to Kilmarnock to become a first-team coach.

== Career statistics ==
=== Player ===
As of 25 January 2013

Club	Season	Competition	League		Cup		League Cup		Other (Note: Includes the Scottish Challenge Cup and UEFA Cup competitions.)		Total	
Club	Season	Competition	Apps	Goals	Apps	Goals	Apps	Goals	Apps	Goals	Apps	Goals
Partick Thistle	1996–97	Scottish First Division	1	0	0	0	0	0	0	0	1	0
Partick Thistle	1997–98	Scottish First Division	29	1	0	0	0	0	1	0	30	1
Partick Thistle	1998–99	Scottish Second Division	32	1	3	0	1	0	0	0	36	1
Partick Thistle	1999–2000	Scottish Second Division	35	0	4	0	1	0	1	0	41	0
Partick Thistle	2000–01	Scottish Second Division	34	2	2	0	1	0	1	0	38	2
Partick Thistle	2001–02	Scottish First Division	33	2	5	0	2	0	3	0	43	2
Partick Thistle	2002–03	Scottish Premier League	36	2	1	0	3	0	0	0	40	2
Partick Thistle	Total		200	8	15	0	8	0	6	0	229	8
Dundee United	2003–04	Scottish Premier League	38	2	1	0	2	0	0	0	41	2
Dundee United	2004–05	Scottish Premier League	38	3	5	1	4	0	0	0	47	4
Dundee United	2005–06	Scottish Premier League	33	1	1	0	1	0	2	0	37	1
Dundee United	2006–07	Scottish Premier League	16	0	1	0	2	0	0	0	19	0
Dundee United	Total		125	6	8	1	9	0	2	0	144	7
Partick Thistle	2006–07	Scottish First Division	9	0	0	0	0	0	0	0	9	0
Partick Thistle	2007–08	Scottish First Division	27	0	6	0	3	0	1	0	37	0
Partick Thistle	2008–09	Scottish First Division	20	0	2	0	0	0	0	0	22	0
Partick Thistle	2009–10	Scottish First Division	27	1	1	0	1	0	2	0	31	1
Partick Thistle	2010–11	Scottish First Division	27	0	3	0	0	0	0	0	30	0
Partick Thistle	2011–12	Scottish First Division	33	0	1	0	0	0	0	0	34	0
Partick Thistle	2012–13	Scottish First Division	16	0	1	0	2	0	0	0	19	0
Partick Thistle	Total		159	1	14	0	6	0	3	0	182	1
Partick Thistle	Combined Total		359	9	29	0	14	0	9	0	411	9
Career total			484	15	37	1	23	0	11	0	555	16

=== Manager ===
As of match played 6 October 2018

Team	From	To	Record				
Team	From	To	G	W	D	L	Win %
Partick Thistle	January 2013	October 2018	250	84	62	104	33.60

== Honours and achievements ==
=== Player ===
Partick Thistle

- Scottish Second Division: 2000–01
- Scottish First Division: 2001–02

Dundee United

- Scottish Cup runner-up: 2005

=== Manager ===
Partick Thistle

- Scottish First Division: 2012–13

=== Assistant Manager ===
Partick Thistle

- Scottish League One: 2020–21
