= 2015–16 Partick Thistle F.C. season =

Partick Thistle
2015–16 season
- Manager: Alan Archibald
- Stadium: Firhill Stadium
- Premiership: 9th
- League Cup: Second round
- Scottish Cup: Fifth round
- Top goalscorer: League: Kris Doolan (14); All: Kris Doolan (14)
- Highest home attendance: 7,238 vs. Celtic, Premiership, 12 March 2016
- Lowest home attendance: 2,221 vs. Falkirk, League Cup, 25 August 2015
- Average home league attendance: 3,797
Home colours	Away colours

The 2015–16 season is Partick Thistle's third season in the Scottish Premiership, having been promoted from the Scottish First Division at the end of the 2012–13 season. Partick Thistle will also compete in the League Cup and the Scottish Cup.

== Results & fixtures ==
Win Draw Loss Postponed

=== Scottish Premiership ===
1 August 2015	Hamilton Academical	0–0	Partick Thistle	New Douglas Park
15:00		BBC Report		Attendance: 2,872; Referee: Colvin

9 August 2015 Premiership	Partick Thistle	0–2	Celtic	Firhill Stadium
		BBC Report	Rogić 28'; Commons 63'	Attendance: 7,088; Referee: Beaton

12 August 2015	Inverness Caledonian Thistle	0–0	Partick Thistle	Caledonian Stadium
19:45		BBC Report		Attendance: 3,141; Referee: Finnie

15 August 2015 Premiership	Partick Thistle	2–2	Kilmarnock	Firhill Stadium
15:00	Doolan 9', 78'; Lindsay (red card) 65'	BBC Report	McKenzie 38'; Boyd 85'	Attendance: 3,600; Referee: Muir

22 August 2015	Heart of Midlothian	3–0	Partick Thistle	Tynecastle Stadium
15:00	Sow 29'; Nicholson 69'; Juanma 71'	BBC Report		Attendance: 16,657; Referee: Beaton

29 August 2015	Partick Thistle	0–2	Aberdeen	Firhill Stadium
15:00		BBC Report	Rooney 49'; McLean 58'	Attendance: 4,940; Referee: Finnie

12 September 2015	Partick Thistle	0–1	Dundee	Firhill Stadium
15:00		BBC Report	Stewart 77'	Attendance: 2,946; Referee: Collum

19 September 2015	Ross County	1–0	Partick Thistle	Victoria Park
15:00	Boyce 18'	BBC Report		Attendance: 3,531; Referee: Aitken

26 September 2015	Motherwell	2–1	Partick Thistle	Fir Park
15:00	Frans 22' (o.g.); McDonald 69'	BBC Report	Amoo 78'	Attendance: 3,963; Referee: McLean

3 October 2015	Partick Thistle	3–0	Dundee United	Firhill Stadium
15:00	Amoo 15'; Dumbuya 55'; Bannigan 65'	BBC Report		Attendance: 3,675; Referee: Thomson

17 October 2015	St Johnstone	1–2	Partick Thistle	McDiarmid Park
15:00	MacLean 48'	BBC Report	Miller 28'; Lawless 34'	Attendance: 3414; Referee: Beaton

24 October 2015	Partick Thistle	1–1	Hamilton Academical	Firhill Stadium
15:00	Pogba 60'	BBC Report	Imrie 78'	Attendance: 3,122; Referee: Anderson

31 October 2015	Partick Thistle	0–4	Heart of Midlothian	Firhill Stadium
15:00	Scully (red card) 85'	BBC Report	Juanma 38', 64' (pen.); Sow 51', 86' (pen.)	Attendance: 4,776; Referee: McLean

7 November 2015	Dundee	1–1	Partick Thistle	Dens Park
15:00	Hemmings 85'	BBC Report	Lindsay 5'	Attendance: 5,067; Referee: Collum

21 November 2015	Partick Thistle	2–1	Inverness Caledonian Thistle	Firhill Stadium
15:00	Doolan 42'; Stevenson 90'	BBC Report	Storey 6'	Attendance: 2,864; Referee: Robertson

28 November 2015	Kilmarnock	2–5	Partick Thistle	Rugby Park
15:00	Magennis 23'; Connolly 72'	BBC Report	Doolan 7', 15'; Fraser 52'; Muirhead 62', 75'	Attendance: 3,860; Referee: Thomson

12 December 2015	Dundee United	0–1	Partick Thistle	Tannadice Park
15:00		BBC Report	Doolan 51'	Attendance: 6,256; Referee: McLean

19 December 2015	Partick Thistle	1–0	Ross County	Firhill Stadium
15:00	Davies 52' (o.g.)	BBC Report		Attendance: 2,762; Referee: Dallas

30 December 2015	Aberdeen	0–0	Partick Thistle	Pittodrie Stadium
15:00		BBC Report		Attendance: 12,583; Referee: Clancy

2 January 2016	Celtic	1–0	Partick Thistle	Celtic Park
	Bitton (yellow card) 68' (yellow-red card); Griffiths 90'	BBC Report		Attendance: 46,067; Referee: Finnie

16 January 2016	Partick Thistle	2–4	Dundee	Firhill Stadium
15:00	Amoo 23'; Lindsay (yellow card) 77' (yellow-red card); Doolan 90'	BBC Report	Hemmings 7' (pen.); Harkins 10', 37'; Stewart 15'	Attendance: 3,222; Referee: Anderson

23 January 2016	Inverness Caledonian Thistle	0–0	Partick Thistle	Caledonian Stadium
15:00		BBC Report		Attendance: 3,556; Referee: Aitken

2 February 2016	Partick Thistle	1–0	Motherwell	Firhill Stadium
	Lawless 90+1'	BBC Report		Attendance: 2,487; Referee: Cook

23 February 2016	Partick Thistle	2–0	St Johnstone	Firhill Stadium
	Doolan 72'; Amoo 87'	Report	Anderson (yellow card) 75'; Wotherspoon (yellow card) 90'	Attendance: 2,320; Referee: (Scotland) John Beaton

27 February 2016	Motherwell	3–1	Partick Thistle	Fir Park
	Moult 37' (pen.) 52'; Johnson 69'	Report	Nisbet (yellow card) 36'; Booth 76'	Attendance: 4,302; Referee: (Scotland) Stephen Finnie

2 March 2016	St Johnstone	1–2	Partick Thistle	McDiarmid Park
	Kane 67'; Craig (yellow card) 90'	Report	Booth 6'; Lawless 13'; Welsh (yellow card) 42'	Attendance: 2,569; Referee: (Scotland) Craig Thomson (referee)

5 March 2016	Heart of Midlothian	1–0	Partick Thistle	Tynecastle Stadium
	Djoum 25'	Report	Edwards (yellow card) 53'	Attendance: 16,558; Referee: (Scotland) Bobby Madden

8 March 2016	Partick Thistle	1–2	Aberdeen	Firhill Stadium
	Booth (yellow card) 31'; Osman (yellow card) 37'; Lawless 60'	Report	Reynolds (yellow card) 41'; Considine 74'; Church 76'	Attendance: 3,915; Referee: (Scotland) Alan Muir

12 March 2016	Partick Thistle	1–2	Celtic	Firhill Stadium
	Amoo (yellow card) 25'; Miller (yellow card) 29'; Welsh 85' (pen.)	Report	Griffiths 45'; McGregor 54'; Brown (yellow card) 78'; Sviatchenko (yellow card) 84'; Bitton (yellow card) 90'	Attendance: 7,238; Referee: (Scotland) Stephen Finnie

19 March 2016	Hamilton Academical	1–2	Partick Thistle	New Douglas Park
	Docherty 10'	Report	Pogba 50'; Edwards 84'	Attendance: 3,055; Referee: Willie Collum

2 April 2016	Partick Thistle	0–0	Kilmarnock	Firhill Stadium
		Report		Attendance: 4,359; Referee: Don Robertson

5 April 2016	Partick Thistle	1–0	Dundee United	Firhill Stadium
	Doolan 71'	Report		Attendance: 4,533; Referee: Andrew Dallas

9 April 2016	Ross County	1–0	Partick Thistle	Victoria Park, Dingwall
	Schalk 14'	Report		Attendance: 3,603; Referee: Nick Walsh

23 April 2016	Partick Thistle	1–2	Dundee	Firhill Stadium
	Doolan 70'	Report	Hemmings 34', 81'	Attendance: 2,769; Referee: Nick Walsh

23 April 2016	Partick Thistle	1–4	Inverness CT	Firhill Stadium
	Doolan 83'	Report	Tremarco 14'; Storey 46'; Meekings 76'; Roberts 85'	Attendance: 2,609; Referee: Euan Anderson

7 May 2016	Kilmarnock	0–2	Partick Thistle	Rugby Park, Kilmarnock
		Report	Lawless 32'; Doolan 66'	Attendance: 5,729; Referee: Andrew Dallas

10 May 2016	Dundee United	3–3	Partick Thistle	Tannadice Park, Dundee
	Frans 67' (o.g.); Ofere 86'; Johnson 90+1'	Report	Frans 6'; Doolan 34'; Edwards 76'	Attendance: 4,689; Referee: Craig Thomson

14 May 2016	Partick Thistle	2–2	Hamilton Academical	Firhill Stadium
	Doolan 3'; Amoo 19'	Report	Brophy 10' (pen.), 20'	Attendance: 2,971; Referee: Alan Muir

=== Scottish League Cup ===
25 August 2015 League Cup round 2	Partick Thistle	0–1	Falkirk	Firhill Stadium
19:45		BBC Report	Grant 32'	Attendance: 2,221; Referee: Thomson

=== Scottish Cup ===
8 January 2015 Fourth round	St Mirren	1–2	Partick Thistle	St Mirren Park
19:30	Watson 88'	BBC Report	Seaborne 62'; Amoo 73'	Attendance: 4,572; Referee: Thomson

6 February 2016 Fifth round	Dundee United	1–0	Partick Thistle	Tannadice Park
15:00	Fraser 85'	BBC Report		Attendance: 5,803; Referee: Collum

== Squad statistics ==
During the 2015–16 season, Partick Thistle have used twenty-five different players in competitive games. The table below shows the number of appearances and goals scored by each player.

=== Appearances ===
As of 14 May 2016

No.	Pos	Nat	Player	Total		Premiership		League Cup		Scottish Cup	
No.	Pos	Nat	Player	Apps	Goals	Apps	Goals	Apps	Goals	Apps	Goals
1	GK	(Czech Republic) CZE	Tomas Cerny	31	0	28+0	0	1+0	0	2+0	0
2	DF	(Scotland) SCO	Gary Miller	24	1	20+1	1	1+0	0	2+0	0
3	DF	(England) ENG	Danny Seaborne	35	1	31+1	0	1+0	0	2+0	1
4	MF	(Scotland) SCO	Sean Welsh	36	0	32+2	0	0+0	0	2+0	0
5	DF	(Scotland) SCO	Callum Booth	37	0	34+0	0	1+0	0	2+0	0
6	MF	(Ghana) GHA	Abdul Osman	36	0	32+1	0	1+0	0	2+0	0
7	MF	(England) ENG	David Amoo	40	4	27+10	3	1+0	0	1+1	1
8	MF	(Scotland) SCO	Stuart Bannigan	28	1	26+0	1	0+0	0	2+0	0
9	FW	(Scotland) SCO	Kris Doolan	39	14	24+12	14	1+0	0	2+0	0
10	MF	(Scotland) SCO	Ryan Stevenson	11	1	6+4	1	1+0	0	0+0	0
11	MF	(Scotland) SCO	Steven Lawless	40	5	36+1	5	1+0	0	2+0	0
12	GK	(Ireland) EIR	Ryan Scully	10	0	9+1	0	0+0	0	0+0	0
13	DF	(Belgium) BEL	Frederic Frans	22	1	17+4	1	0+0	0	1+0	0
14	FW	(England) ENG	Christie Elliott	12	0	5+7	0	0+0	0	0+0	0
15	DF	(Sierra Leone) SLE	Mustapha Dumbuya	21	1	19+2	1	0+0	0	0+0	0
17	DF	(Scotland) SCO	Liam Lindsay	27	1	25+0	1	0+0	0	2+0	0
18	MF	(Scotland) SCO	David Wilson	12	0	4+7	0	0+1	0	0+0	0
19	DF	(Scotland) SCO	Jack Hendry	4	0	1+2	0	1+0	0	0+0	0
19	MF	(Australia) AUS	Ryan Edwards	17	2	10+7	2	0+0	0	0+0	0
20	MF	(Scotland) SCO	Declan McDaid	5	0	1+3	0	0+1	0	0+0	0
22	MF	(Scotland) SCO	Gary Fraser	14	1	7+5	1	1+0	0	0+1	0
23	FW	(Scotland) SCO	Robbie Muirhead	8	2	4+4	2	0+0	0	0+0	0
27	FW	(Scotland) SCO	Kevin Nisbet	9	0	0+8	0	0+0	0	0+1	0
35	GK	(Scotland) SCO	Paul Gallacher	1	0	1+0	0	0+0	0	0+0	0
99	FW	(Guinea) GUI	Mathias Pogba	30	2	13+15	2	0+1	0	0+1	0

=== Disciplinary record ===
As of 14 May 2016

Number	Nation	Position	Name	Premiership		League Cup		Scottish Cup		Total	
Number	Nation	Position	Name	Booked	Sent off (straight red)	Booked	Sent off (straight red)	Booked	Sent off (straight red)	Booked	Sent off (straight red)
2	(Scotland)	DF	Gary Miller	5	0	0	0	0	0	5	0
3	(England)	DF	Danny Seaborne	8	0	0	0	0	0	8	0
4	(Scotland)	MF	Sean Welsh	6	0	0	0	0	0	6	0
5	(Scotland)	DF	Callum Booth	5	0	0	0	0	0	5	0
6	(Ghana)	MF	Abdul Osman	11	1	0	0	1	0	12	1
7	(England)	MF	David Amoo	1	0	0	0	0	0	1	0
8	(Scotland)	MF	Stuart Bannigan	10	0	0	0	0	0	10	0
11	(Scotland)	MF	Steven Lawless	3	0	0	0	0	0	3	0
12	(Republic of Ireland)	GK	Ryan Scully	0	1	0	0	0	0	0	1
13	(Belgium)	DF	Frederic Frans	4	1	0	0	0	0	4	1
15	(Sierra Leone)	DF	Mustapha Dumbuya	3	0	0	0	0	0	'2	0
17	(Scotland)	DF	Liam Lindsay	7	2	0	0	0	0	7	3
18	(Scotland)	MF	David Wilson	1	0	0	0	0	0	1	0
19	(Australia)	MF	Ryan Edwards	1	0	0	0	0	0	1	0
23	(Scotland)	FW	Robbie Muirhead	2	0	0	0	0	0	2	0
29	(Scotland)	MF	James Penrice	1	0	0	0	0	0	1	0
99	(Guinea)	FW	Mathias Pogba	2	0	0	0	1	0	3	0
			TOTALS	54	5	0	0	2	0	56	5

== Team statistics ==
=== League table ===
Pos	Team	Pld	W	D	L	GF	GA	GD	Pts	Qualification or relegation (Note: Teams play each other three times (33 matches), before the league is split into two groups (the top six and the bottom six).)
7	Inverness Caledonian Thistle	38	14	10	14	54	48	+6	52	
8	Dundee	38	11	15	12	53	57	−4	48	
9	Partick Thistle	38	12	10	16	41	50	−9	46	
10	Hamilton Academical	38	11	10	17	42	63	−21	43	
11	Kilmarnock (O)	38	9	9	20	41	64	−23	36	Qualification for the Premiership play-off final

Source: Scottish Premiership, Soccerway (first phase), Soccerway (second phase)
Rules for classification: 1) Points; 2) Goal difference; 3) Goals scored; 4) Play-off (only if deciding champion, UEFA competitions qualification and second stage group allocation).
(O) Play-off winners

=== Division summary ===
Round	1	2	3	4	5	6	7	8	9	10	11	12	13	14	15	16	17	18	19	20	21	22	23	24	25	26	27	28	29	30	31	32	33	34	35	36	37	38
Ground	A	H	A	H	A	H	H	A	A	H	A	H	H	A	H	A	A	H	A	A	H	A	H	H	A	A	A	H	H	A	H	H	A	H	H	A	A	H
Result	D	L	D	D	L	L	L	L	L	W	W	D	L	D	W	W	W	W	D	L	L	D	W	W	L	W	L	L	L	W	D	W	L	L	L	W	D	D
Position	7	11	10	8	10	11	12	12	12	11	11	11	11	11	10	9	8	7	7	9	9	8	8	8	9	7	8	8	8	7	8	7	8	8	9	9	9	9

Updated to match(es) played on 14 May 2016. Source:
A = Away; H = Home; W = Win; D = Draw; L = Loss

=== Management statistics ===
Last updated on 14 May 2016

Name	From	To	P	W	D	L	Win% (Note: Win% is the percentage of matches won rounded to two decimal places.)
Alan Archibald	1 August 2015	Present	38	12	10	16	31.58

== Transfers ==
=== In ===
Player	From	Fee
(Scotland) Gary Miller	(Scotland) St Johnstone	Free
(Czech Republic) Tomáš Černý	(Scotland) Hibernian	Free
(England) David Amoo	(England) Carlisle United	Free
(Scotland) Callum Booth	(Scotland) Hibernian	Free
(Guinea) Mathias Pogba	(England) Crawley Town	Free
(Scotland) Robbie Muirhead	(Scotland) Dundee United	Loan
(Sierra Leone) Mustapha Dumbuya	Free agent	Free
(Australia) Ryan Edwards	(England) Reading	Free
(Scotland) Aidan Nesbitt	(Scotland) Celtic	Loan
(England) Antonio German	(India) Kerala Blasters	Free

=== Out ===
Player	To	Fee
(England) Kallum Higginbotham	(Scotland) Kilmarnock	Free
(Scotland) Scott Fox	(Scotland) Ross County	Free
(Scotland) Stephen O'Donnell	(England) Luton Town	Free
(England) James Craigen	(Scotland) Raith Rovers	Free
(England) Ben Richards-Everton	(Scotland) Dunfermline Athletic	Free
(Scotland) Dale Keenan	(Scotland) Stranraer	Free
(England) Conrad Balatoni	(Scotland) Kilmarnock	Free
(Scotland) Ryan Finnie	(Scotland) Annan Athletic	Free
(Scotland) Chris Dillon	Released	Free
(Scotland) Jack Hendry	(England) Wigan Athletic	Undisclosed
(Scotland) Ryan Stevenson	(Scotland) Ayr United	Loan
(Scotland) Ryan Stevenson	(Scotland) Ayr United	Free
(Australia) Chris Duggan	(Scotland) Queen's Park	Loan

== See also ==
- List of Partick Thistle F.C. seasons
