= Stuart Bannigan =

Scottish footballer

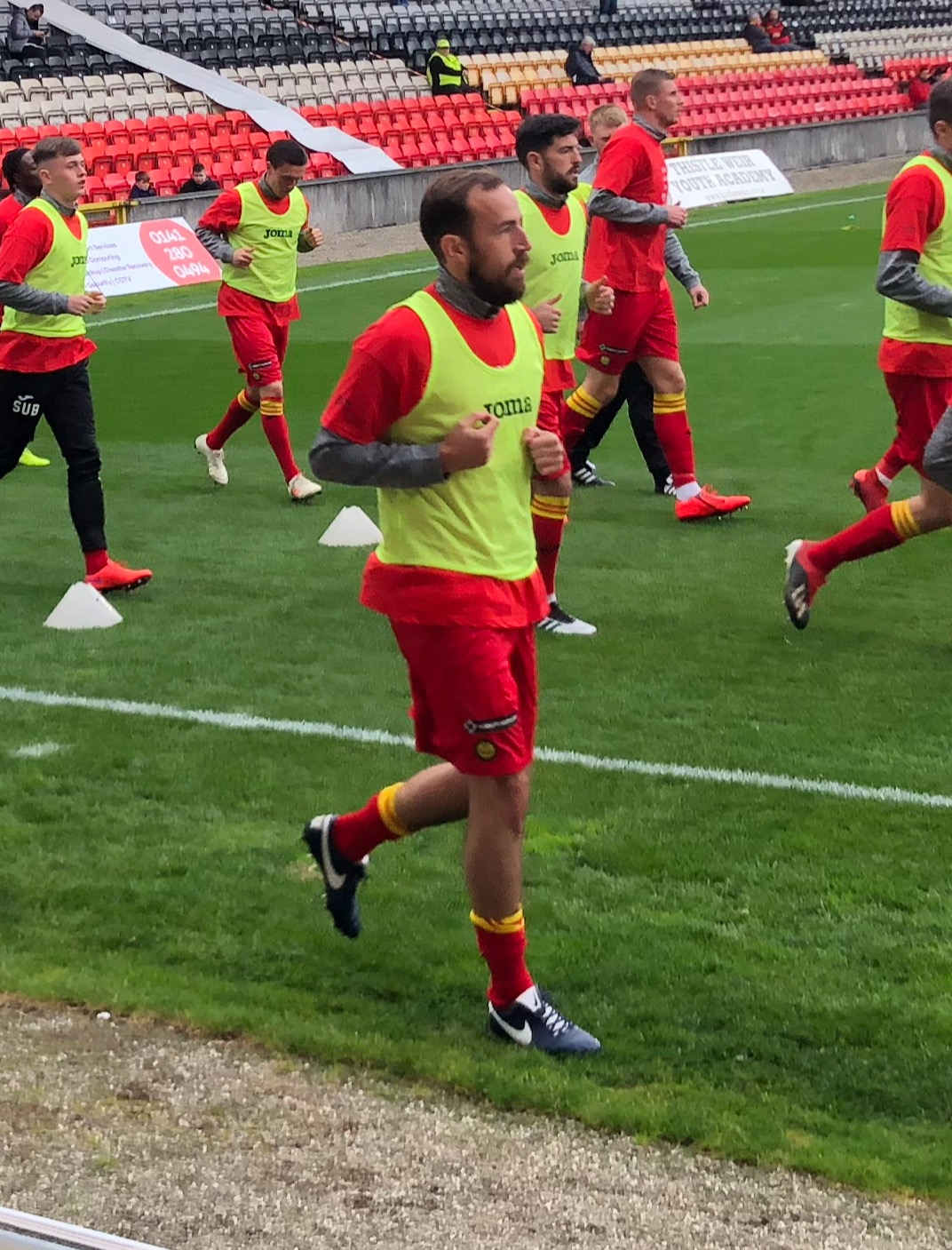

Personal information
- Date of birth: 17 September 1992 (age 34)
- Place of birth: Bishopbriggs, Scotland
- Height: 1.80 m (5 ft 11 in)
- Position: Defensive midfielder

Team information
- Current team: Hamilton Academical
- Number: 17

Youth career
- 2008–2010: Partick Thistle

Senior career*
| Years | Team | Apps | (Gls) |
| 2010–2025 | Partick Thistle | 349 | (16) |
| 2010–2011 | → Ayr United (loan) | 17 | (4) |
| 2025–2026 | Ayr United | 29 | (0) |
| 2026– | Hamilton Academical | 14 | (1) |

International career
| 2013 | Scotland U21 | 3 | (0) |
- * Club domestic league appearances and goals as of 16:44, 13 November 2026 (UTC)

Stuart Bannigan (born 17 September 1992) is a Scottish professional footballer who plays for Scottish League One club Hamilton Academical. A product of Partick Thistle’s youth setup, Bannigan spent 15 years at the club. He also played for the Scotland U21 team.

== Career ==
=== Partick Thistle ===
Bannigan signed permanently for the Partick Thistle youth development team, full-time, in May 2009, following a period of trialling prior to a full-time contract. playing in the U17s side, Bannigan made his first team debut as a substitute on 24 July 2010 against Clyde in the Scottish Challenge Cup. He went on to make his league debut for Partick Thistle on 11 September 2010 against Stirling in the Scottish First Division. He made one more appearance before being sent out on loan.

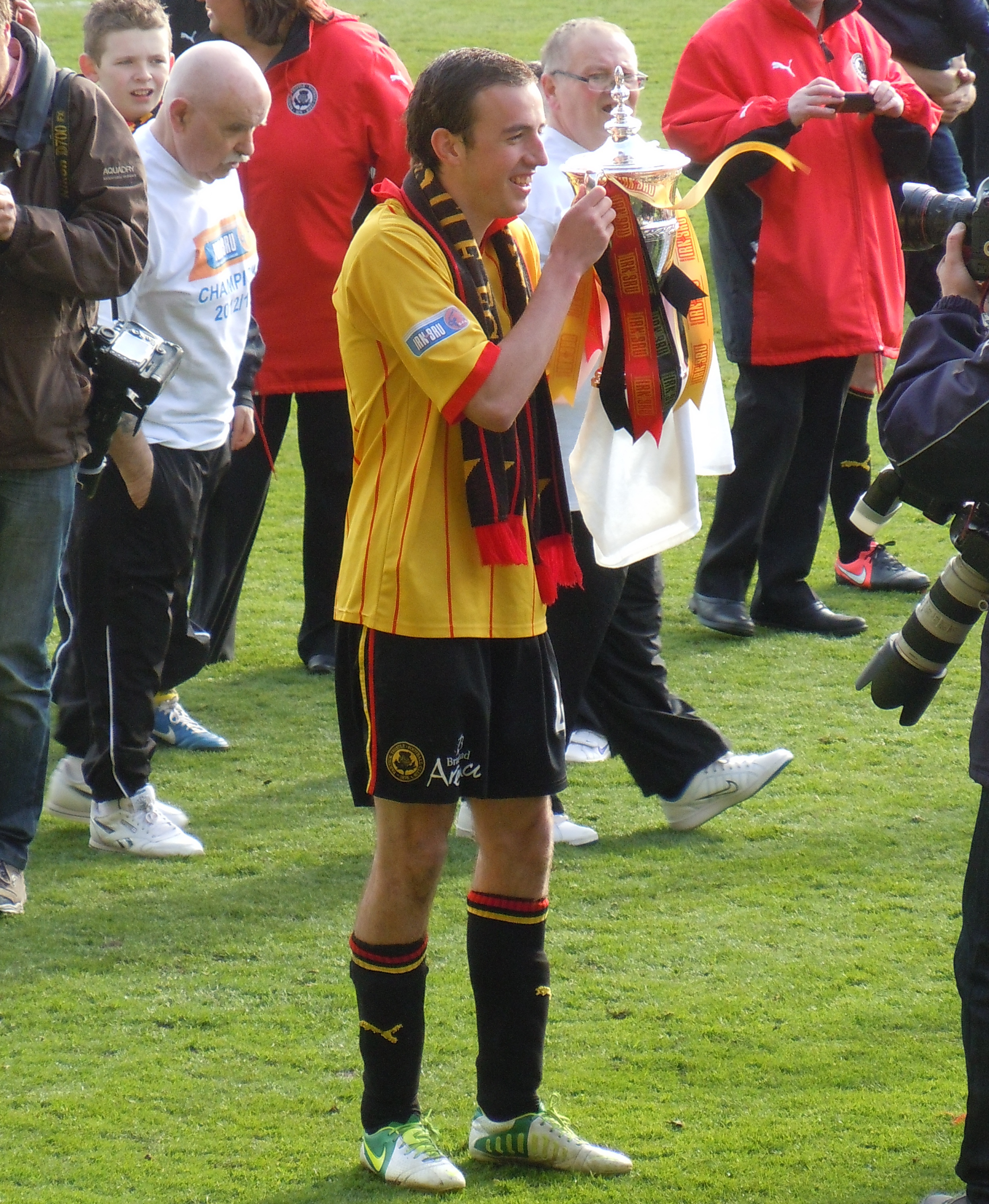
Bannigan holding the Scottish First Division trophy in 2013.

On 4 November 2010 Bannigan joined Scottish Second Division side Ayr United on a one-month loan deal. He made his debut against Dumbarton on 13 November 2010. After only 5 games his loan was extended until the end of the season. Bannigan made 24 Appearances scoring 4 goals to help Ayr gain promotion to the Scottish First Division via the play-offs.

Following his loan spell at Ayr United, Bannigan would be used intermittently in the Partick first team during the 2011–12 season. He scored his first Thistle goal against Hamilton Academical, in which the result was 2–2. In 2012–13, Bannigan scored his first goal of the season against Queens Park at Hampden Park in a 5–4 thriller in the second round of the Scottish Challenge Cup. A a week later, on 25 August 2012, Bannigan set up a goal for Kris Doolan before scoring himself in a 3–0 win over Dumbarton. In a match against Falkirk on 27 October 2012, Bannigan suffered a leg injury in the first half and was substituted. Forty-eight-hour later, Bannigan revealed he passed his driving test. Though it was serious at first, Bannigan managed to escape the injury, which he describe it as "relieved". On 24 November 2012, Bannigan scored his second league goal of the season, in a 2–0 win over Livingston. In the next game on 15 December 2012, he scored again in a 3–2 win over Raith Rovers. He was substituted during the extra-time period of the 2013 Scottish Challenge Cup Final, which Thistle lost to Queen of the South. At the end of the 2012–13 season, Bannigan was named in the PFA Scotland Team of the Year, and won the club's young player of the year award. He signed a new two-year contract in June 2013.

In September 2013, Bannigan was awarded the Scottish Premiership Young Player of the Month award. On 14 May 2014, he signed a new two-year deal with the Jags.

Bannigan scored his first Scottish Premiership goal opening the scoring in a 4–0 win over Ross County in Thistle's first game of the 2014–15 season. He made his 100th league appearance for Partick Thistle against Hamilton Academical at Firhill on 23 August 2014.

Bannigan decided to leave Partick Thistle at the end of his contract in May 2016, having rejected their offer of a new deal; However, on 27 June 2016, he reversed his decision to leave and committed to the club for a further two years. As of the 2018–19 season, Bannigan became the new club captain, as Kris Doolan returned to his role as vice-captain, having stood in for Abdul Osman for the previous season. In late 2018, Bannigan signed an 18-month extension to remain at Partick Thistle until 2020.

In early 2020, under the new management of Ian McCall, Bannigan penned a new 2-year contract extension, to remain at Partick Thistle until 2022, which would see him earn a testimonial at the club due to his decade of service.

After the 2019–20 season finished early due to the Coronavirus pandemic, Partick Thistle were relegated for the second time in three seasons, being relegated to League One. Bannigan chose to stay at the club following their relegation, making him and teammate James Penrice the only two players left at the club from their time in the Premiership. Bannigan scored his first goal in League One curling a free kick into the top corner in a 5–0 win over Montrose. After winning Scottish League One with the Jags in 2020–21, Bannigan (now the longest-serving player) signed a new contract adding an extra year to his deal, extending it until 2023.

In 2022, it was announced that alongside former teammate Chris Erskine, Bannigan would be inducted into the Partick Thistle Hall of Fame ahead of a testimonial to take place the following year.

Bannigan was part of the Thistle squad that made it to the 2023 Scottish Premiership promotion play off final, which Thistle eventually lost on penalties to Ross County, meaning Thistle remained in the Scottish Championship. Following this, Bannigan signed a new two-year contract extension with the club until 2025.

Bannigan scored his first goal of the 2023–24 season with a 25-yard volley into the top corner, in a 3–0 away win over Premiership side Ross County in the Scottish Cup.

=== Ayr United ===
14 years after his initial loan spell, Bannigan signed a one-year deal with Ayr United in June 2025, ending his 15-year stay with Partick Thistle.

== Style of play ==
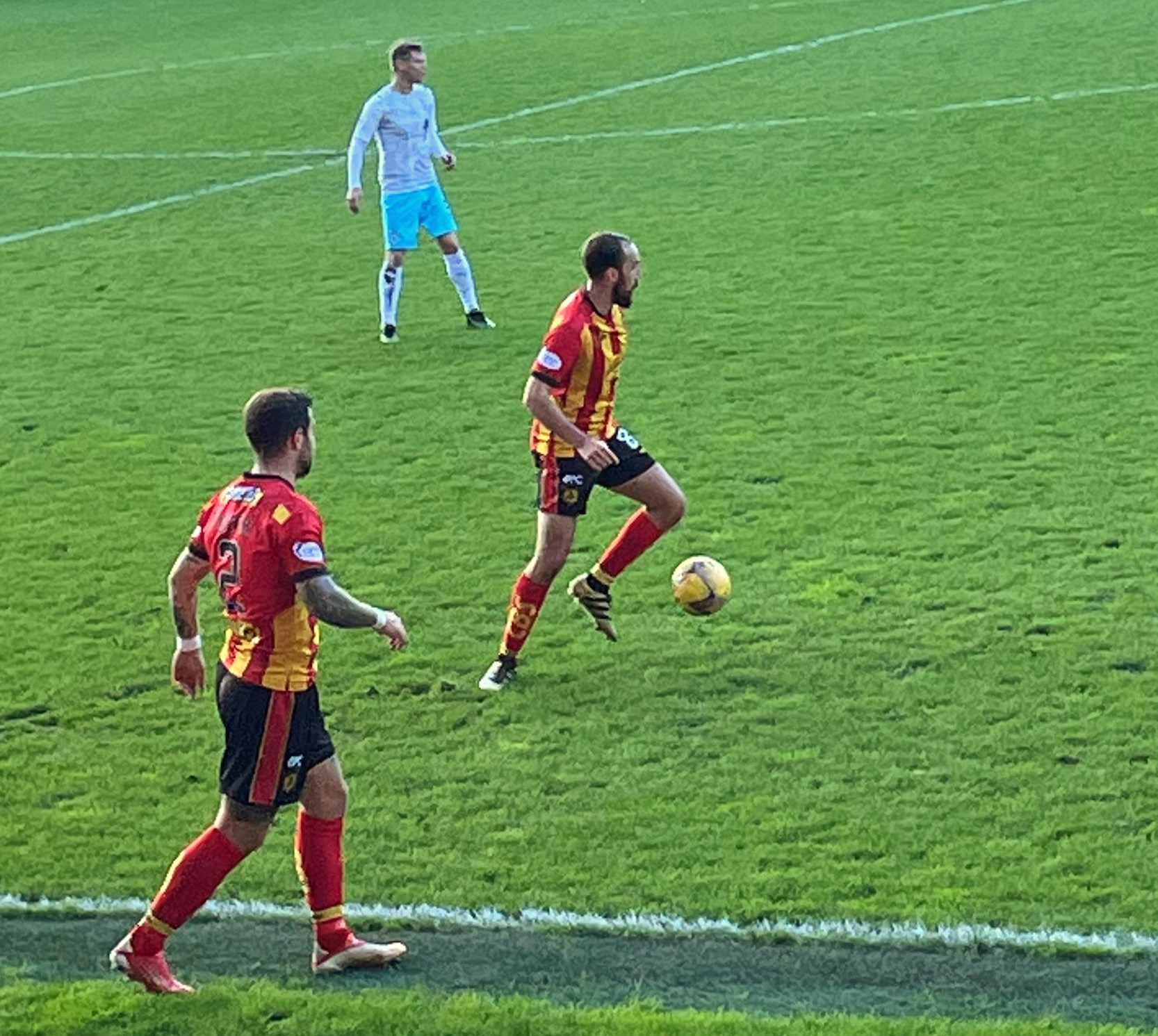
Bannigan playing for Partick Thistle in 2021.

Bannigan is known for his flicks, passing, creative instinct and leadership. He has been described as a tough and tenacious player who is a consistently strong midfielder. He has struggled with a knee injury, being sidelined for the second half of the 2015–16 season, all of 2016–17 and most of 2017–18 before making a gradual return in late 2018.

== International career ==
Along with teammate Stephen O'Donnell, Bannigan was called up by Billy Stark for the Scotland U21 squad. Bannigan played his first match international debut, in a 1–1 draw against Greece U21. He was also called up for an under-21 match against England.

== Career statistics ==
=== Club ===
As of match played 8 November 2025

Appearances and goals by club, season and competition
| Club | Season | League | | | Scottish Cup | | League Cup | | Other | | Total | |
| Club | Season | Division | Apps | Goals | Apps | Goals | Apps | Goals | Apps | Goals | Apps | Goals |
|---|---|---|---|---|---|---|---|---|---|---|---|---|
| Partick Thistle | 2010–11 | Scottish First Division | 2 | 0 | 0 | 0 | 0 | 0 | 0 | 0 | 2 | 0 |
| Partick Thistle | 2011–12 | Scottish First Division | 14 | 1 | 0 | 0 | 1 | 0 | 1 (Note: Appearance(s) in Scottish Challenge Cup) | 0 | 16 | 1 |
| Partick Thistle | 2012–13 | Scottish First Division | 33 | 3 | 1 | 0 | 2 | 0 | 3 | 1 | 39 | 4 |
| Partick Thistle | 2013–14 | Scottish Premiership | 33 | 0 | 0 | 0 | 2 | 0 | — | | 35 | 0 |
| Partick Thistle | 2014–15 | Scottish Premiership | 36 | 3 | 2 | 0 | 3 | 0 | — | | 41 | 3 |
| Partick Thistle | 2015–16 | Scottish Premiership | 26 | 1 | 2 | 0 | 0 | 0 | — | | 28 | 1 |
| Partick Thistle | 2016–17 | Scottish Premiership | 0 | 0 | 0 | 0 | 0 | 0 | — | | 0 | 0 |
| Partick Thistle | 2017–18 | Scottish Premiership | 6 | 0 | 0 | 0 | 6 | 0 | 0 | 0 | 12 | 0 |
| Partick Thistle | 2018–19 | Scottish Championship | 28 | 2 | 3 | 0 | 0 | 0 | 0 | 0 | 31 | 2 |
| Partick Thistle | 2019–20 | Scottish Championship | 25 | 4 | 1 | 1 | 6 | 0 | 2 | 0 | 34 | 5 |
| Partick Thistle | 2020–21 | Scottish League One | 19 | 1 | 2 | 0 | 4 | 0 | 0 | 0 | 25 | 1 |
| Partick Thistle | 2021–22 | Scottish Championship | 35 | 0 | 3 | 0 | 4 | 0 | 4 (Note: Two appearances in Scottish Challenge Cup; Two appearances in Scottish Premiership play-offs) | 0 | 46 | 0 |
| Partick Thistle | 2022–23 | Scottish Championship | 34 | 1 | 3 | 0 | 5 | 0 | 4 (Note: One appearance in Scottish Challenge Cup; Three appearances in Scottish Premiership play-offs) | 0 | 46 | 1 |
| Partick Thistle | 2023–24 | Scottish Championship | 29 | 0 | 3 | 1 | 5 | 0 | 5 (Note: One appearance in Scottish Challenge Cup; Four appearances in Scottish Premiership play-offs) | 0 | 42 | 1 |
| Partick Thistle | 2024–25 | Scottish Championship | 29 | 0 | 1 | 0 | 3 | 0 | 5 (Note: One appearance n Scottish Challenge Cup; Four appearances in Scottish Premiership play-offs) | 0 | 38 | 0 |
| Partick Thistle | Total | | 349 | 16 | 21 | 2 | 41 | 0 | 24 | 1 | 435 | 19 |
| Ayr United (loan) | 2010–11 | Scottish Second Division | 17 | 4 | 3 | 0 | — | | 4 (Note: Appearance(s) in Scottish First Division play-offs) | 0 | 24 | 4 |
| Ayr United | 2025–26 | Scottish Championship | 9 | 0 | 0 | 0 | 1 | 0 | 0 | 0 | 10 | 0 |
| Career total | | | 375 | 20 | 24 | 2 | 42 | 0 | 28 | 1 | 469 | 23 |

== Honours ==
Partick Thistle

- Scottish First Division: 2012–13
- Scottish League One: 2020–21

Individual

- Scottish Football League Young Player of the Month: January 2013
- PFA Scotland First Division Team of the Year: 2012–13
- Partick Thistle: Hall of Fame: 2023
