= Christie Elliott =

English footballer

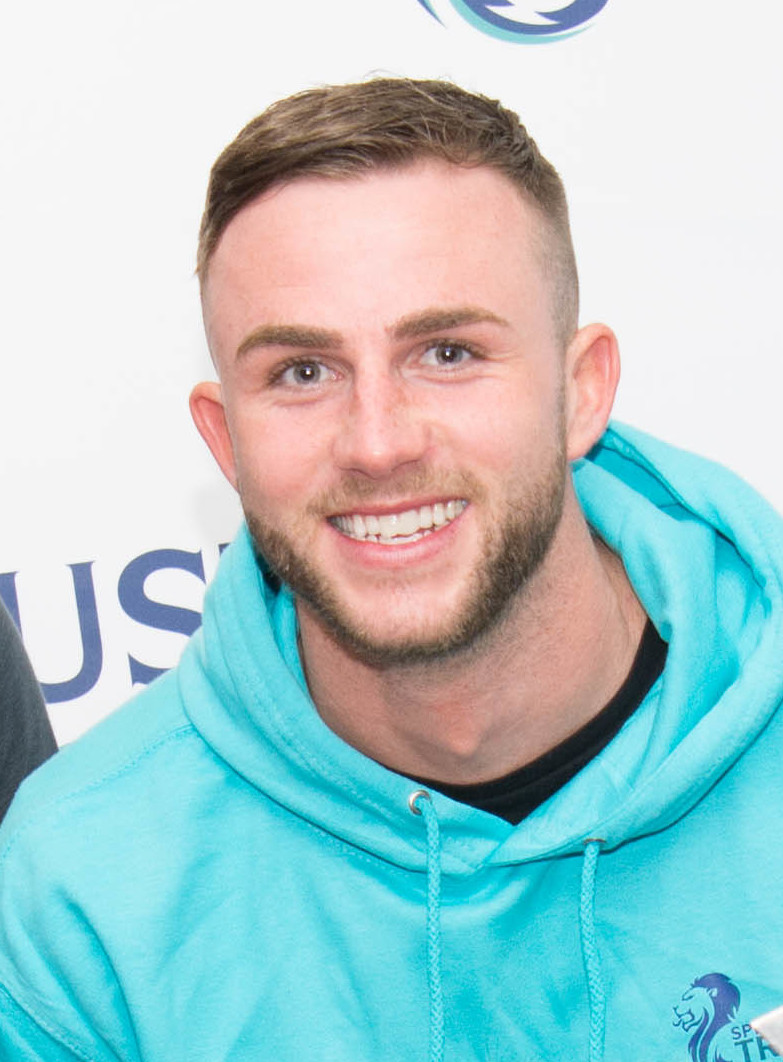

Personal information
- Full name: Christie James Elliott
- Date of birth: 26 May 1991 (age 35)
- Place of birth: South Shields, England
- Positions: Full-back; wing-back

Senior career*
Years	Team	Apps	(Gls)
2008–2009	Jarrow		
2009–2011	Whitley Bay		
2011–2019	Partick Thistle	200	(11)
2012	→ Albion Rovers (loan)	6	(1)
2019–2020	Carlisle United	16	(1)
2020–2022	Dundee	44	(1)
- * Club domestic league appearances and goals as of 13:30, 22 May 2022 (UTC)

Christie James Elliott (born 26 May 1991) is an English former professional footballer. Having previously played for English lower league sides Jarrow and Whitley Bay, Elliott signed a two-year deal with then Scottish First Division side Partick Thistle. He was loaned in 2012 to Scottish Second Division side Albion Rovers before returning to Firhill in January 2013. After a stint with Carlisle United after a lengthy term with Partick, he returned to Scotland with Dundee. Having started his career as a striker, he primarily played as a defender for most of it, playing the majority of games at right-back and providing the occasional cover at left-back. Christie announced his retirement from professional football at age 31 on 16 August 2022 after leaving Dundee in the summer.

== Career ==
Born in South Shields, Elliott began his career at local lower league club Jarrow before moving to Whitley Bay.

=== Partick Thistle ===
On 19 August 2011, Partick Thistle manager Jackie McNamara signed the 20-year-old on a two-year deal. The following day he scored a goal within five minutes of his debut during a 1–1 draw with Hamilton Academical on 20 August 2011. During the 2012–13 season, Elliott scored two goals, one against Hamilton and the other a ninetieth-minute winner against Airdrie United after Conrad Balatoni had equalised for Thistle in the 89th minute, as Thistle won 2–1 to close in on the First Division title.

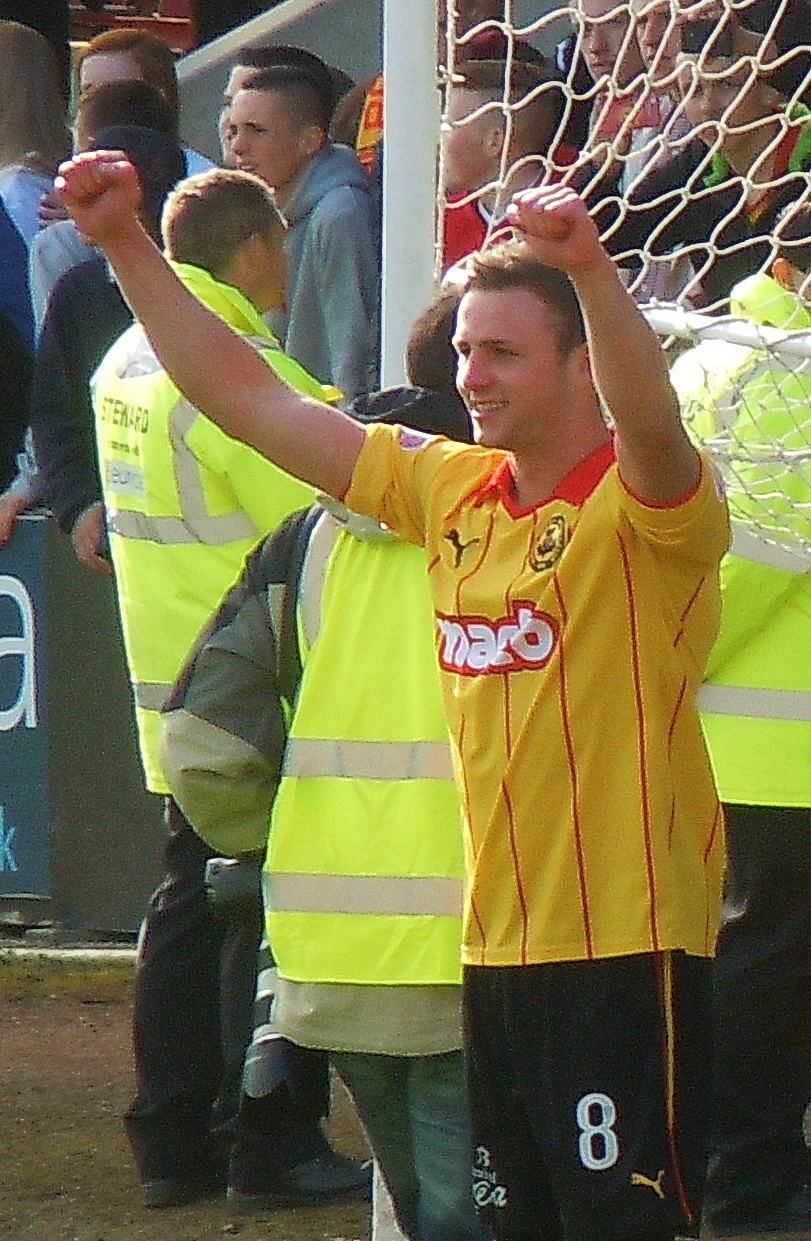
Elliott celebrating in 2012.

After Thistle had won promotion to the Scottish Premiership, on 28 May 2013, Elliott agreed a new deal with the club. In the 2013–14 season he scored his first Premiership goal in a 5–1 defeat to Celtic. In the 2014–15 season, Elliot scored a goal in a 3–3 draw with Hamilton making the score 3–2 in favour of his side who had been 2–0 down. Elliott scored his second goal of the season in a 1–0 away win against St Mirren, scoring the winner in the 75th minute.

On 14 May 2015, Elliott signed a new two-year contract extension with the Jags to keep him at Firhill until the end of the 2016–17 football season. he later further extended his contract until 2019. On 29 July 2017 he scored his first goal in two seasons in a League Cup game against Stranraer, scoring an 87th-minute winner in a 1–0 result.

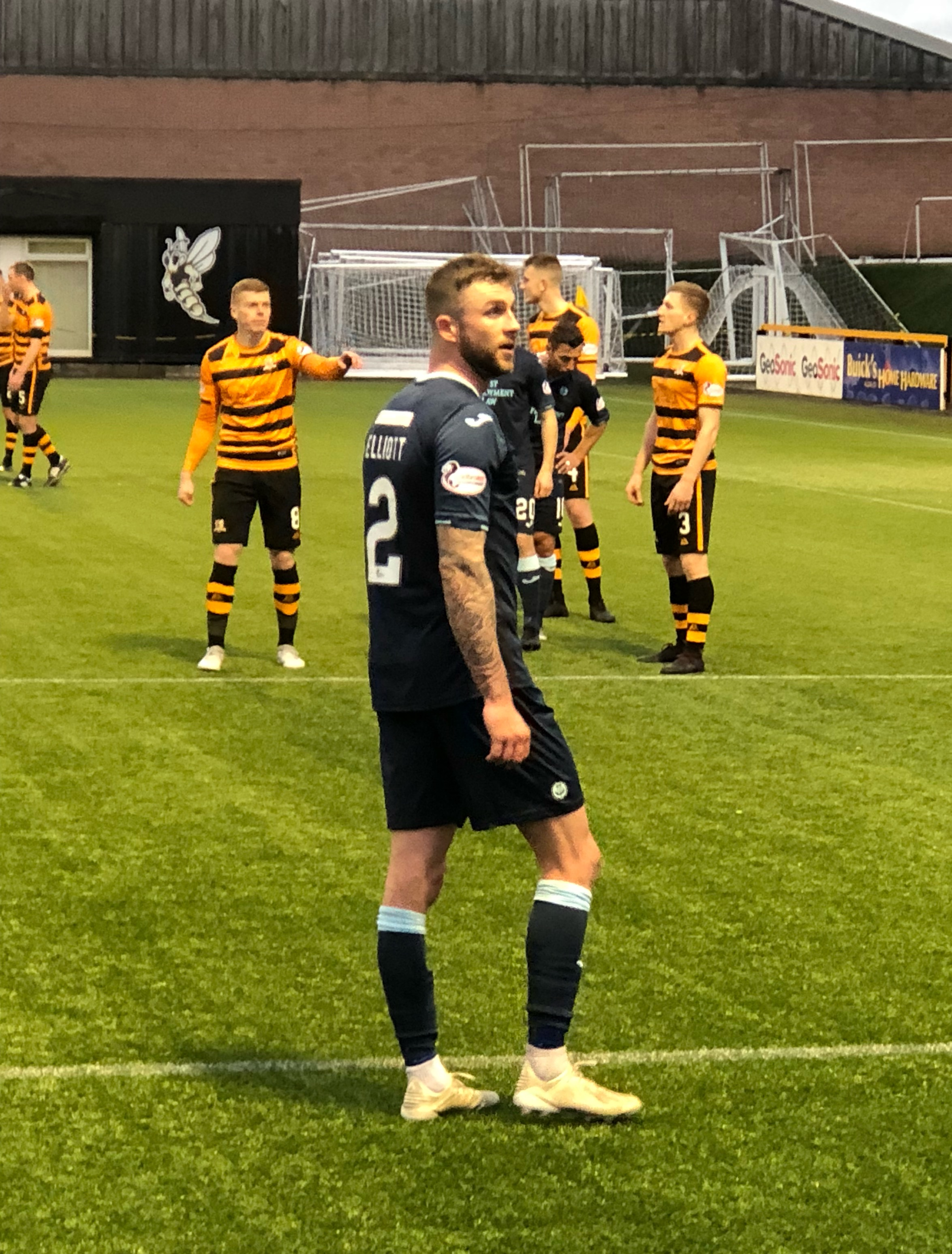
Elliott in 2019 playing for Partick Thistle

Elliott was made captain of Partick Thistle in the early stages of the 2018–19 season, however stood down from the role after the departure of manager Alan Archibald, as he said it was affecting his game. He scored his first goal of the season in a 4–2 defeat to league leaders Ross County, his second in a Scottish Cup quarter-final against Hearts, earning the Jags a replay.

Following a disappointing season for Partick Thistle on their return to the Championship, Elliott left the club in May 2019, having rejected a new contract which would have seen him to his testimonial year.

=== Albion Rovers loan ===
On 22 November 2012, Elliott joined Scottish Second Division side Albion Rovers on loan for one month. The loan was then extended until 19 January 2013.

=== Carlisle United ===
Carlisle United announced on 14 May 2019 that Elliott had signed a one-year deal, subject to all relevant international clearances.

=== Dundee ===
After agreeing to leave Carlisle by mutual consent after struggling with injury and lack of game time, Elliott immediately headed back north and signed with Scottish Championship side Dundee for the remainder of the season, with an option to extend. After the premature conclusion of the season due to the COVID-19 pandemic, Dundee triggered the extension clause in Elliott's contract, keeping him at the club for the following year.

In January 2021, Dundee announced Elliott had triggered an appearance clause in his contract, triggering a further one-year extension and keeping him at the club until 2022. He would be a part of the team which would win the Premiership play-offs and help Dundee gain promotion to the Scottish Premiership. In March 2022, Elliott would finally score his first league goal for Dundee in a league game against Rangers. Elliott would leave Dundee following the end of his contract in May 2022.

== Career statistics ==
As of 9 April 2022

Appearances and goals by club, season and competition
Club	Season	League			National Cup		League Cup		Other		Total	
Club	Season	Division	Apps	Goals	Apps	Goals	Apps	Goals	Apps	Goals	Apps	Goals
Partick Thistle	2011–12	Scottish First Division	29	5	3	1	0	0	0	0	32	6
Partick Thistle	2012–13	Scottish First Division	22	2	1	0	1	0	5 (Note: Appearances in the Scottish Challenge Cup)	1	29	3
Partick Thistle	2013–14	Scottish Premiership	30	1	1	0	3	2	—		34	3
Partick Thistle	2014–15	Scottish Premiership	26	2	2	0	3	0	—		31	2
Partick Thistle	2015–16	Scottish Premiership	12	0	0	0	0	0	—		12	0
Partick Thistle	2016–17	Scottish Premiership	31	0	2	0	0	0	—		33	0
Partick Thistle	2017–18	Scottish Premiership	17	0	0	0	6	1	1 (Note: Appearances in the Premiership play-offs)	0	24	1
Partick Thistle	2018–19	Scottish Championship	33	1	4	1	5	0	2	0	40	2
Partick Thistle	Total		200	11	13	2	18	3	7	1	235	17
Albion Rovers (loan)	2012–13	Scottish Second Division	6	1	0	0	0	0	0	0	6	1
Carlisle United	2019–20	EFL League Two	16	1	1	0	2	0	3	0	22	1
Dundee	2019–20	Scottish Championship	6	0	0	0	0	0	0	0	6	0
Dundee	2020–21	Scottish Championship	25	0	0	0	4	1	3 (Note: Appearances in the Premiership play-offs)	0	32	1
Dundee	2021–22	Scottish Premiership	13	1	2	0	3	1	—		18	2
Dundee	Total		44	1	2	0	7	2	3	0	56	3
Career total			266	14	16	2	26	5	13	1	318	22
