= 2014–15 Partick Thistle F.C. season =

Partick Thistle
2014–15 season
- Manager: Alan Archibald
- Stadium: Firhill Stadium
- Premiership: 8th
- League Cup: Second round
- Scottish Cup: Fifth round
- Top goalscorer: League: Kris Doolan (9); All: Kris Doolan (10)
- Highest home attendance: 5,776 vs. Celtic, Premiership, 11 February 2015
- Lowest home attendance: 1,879 vs. St Mirren, League Cup, 23 September 2014
- Average home league attendance: 3,586
Home colours	Away colours

The 2014–15 season was Partick Thistle's second consecutive season in the Scottish Premiership and their second season back in the top-flight of Scottish football, having been promoted from the First Division at the end of the 2012–13 season. Thistle also competed in the League Cup and the Scottish Cup.

== Summary ==
=== Season ===
Partick Thistle finished in eighth place in the Scottish Premiership with 46 points, they also reached quarter-final of the League Cup and the fifth round of the Scottish Cup.

== Results and fixtures ==
Win Draw Loss Postponed

=== Pre Season ===
12 July 2014	Brighton & Hove Albion	4–0	Partick Thistle	Pinatar Arena, San Pedro del Pinatar, Spain
19:00	Mackail-Smith 43'; Greer 45'; Fenelon 51'; Harris 73'	Report

19 July 2014	Dumbarton	1–1	Partick Thistle	Dumbarton Football Stadium, Dumbarton
19:00	Prunty 56'	Report	Stevenson 68'

27 July 2014	Glentoran	1–3	Partick Thistle	The Oval, Belfast
16:00	Stewart 43 pen.'	Report	Doolan 34'; Fraser 70'; Higginbotham 87 pen.'

2 August 2014	Fleetwood Town	0–0	Partick Thistle	Highbury Stadium, Fleetwood
15:00		Report

6 August 2014	Partick Thistle	3–1	Sunderland	Firhill Stadium, Glasgow
19:30		Report

=== Scottish Premiership ===
13 August 2014 1	Partick Thistle	4–0	Ross County	Firhill Stadium, Glasgow
19:45	Bannigan 40'; Frempah 55 o.g.' Fraser 73'; O'Donnell 90+2'	Report		Attendance: 3,261; Referee: Andrew Dallas

16 August 2014 2	Dundee	1–1	Partick Thistle	Dens Park, Dundee
15:00	Wighton 54'	Report	Fraser 4'; Fox (red card) 61'	Attendance: 6,453; Referee: Craig Charleston

23 August 2014 3	Partick Thistle	1–2	Hamilton Academical	Firhill Stadium, Glasgow
15:00	Higginbotham 85'	Report	Andreu 87'; Scotland 90+2'	Attendance: 3,578; Referee: Kevin Clancy

30 August 2014 4	Aberdeen	2–0	Partick Thistle	Pittodrie Stadium, Aberdeen
15:00	Low 47'; McGinn 66'	Report		Attendance: 11,003; Referee: Brian Colvin

13 September 2014 5	Partick Thistle	3–1	Inverness CT	Firhill Stadium, Glasgow
15:00	Lawless 19'; Osman 23'; Higginbotham 72'	Report		Attendance: 2,917; Referee: Stephen Finnie

19 September 2014 6	Partick Thistle	1–2	St Mirren	Firhill Stadium, Glasgow
15:00	Doolan 22'	Report	Ball 60'; McLean 90+5 pen.'	Attendance: 3,821; Referee: Willie Collum

27 September 2014 7	Kilmarnock	3–0	Partick Thistle	Rugby Park, Kilmarnock
15:00	Obadeyi 25', 57'; Pascali 51'	Report		Attendance: 3,980; Referee: Andrew Dallas

4 October 2014 8	Partick Thistle	3–1	Motherwell	Firhill Stadium, Glasgow
15:00	Bannigan 16'; Doolan 63'; O’Donnell 82'	Report	Ainsworth 72'	Attendance: 3,405; Referee: Bobby Madden

18 October 2014 9	Dundee United	1–0	Partick Thistle	Tannadice Park, Dundee
15:00	Ciftci 84 pen.'	Report	Seaborne 83'	Attendance: 6,756; Referee: Steven McLean

25 October 2014 10	Partick Thistle	0–0	St Johnstone	Firhill Stadium, Glasgow
15:00		Report		Attendance: 3,090; Referee: Calum Murray

1 November 2014 11	Hamilton Academical	3–3	Partick Thistle	New Douglas Park, Hamilton
15:00	MacKinnon 22'; Redmond 23'; Andreu 90+4'	Report	McMillan 32'; Craigen 68'; Elliott 72'	Attendance: 2,855; Referee: Brian Colvin

8 November 2014 12	St Mirren	0–1	Partick Thistle	St Mirren Park, Paisley
15:00		Report	Elliott 75'	Attendance: 4,636; Referee: John Beaton

23 November 2014 13	Partick Thistle	0–1	Aberdeen	Firhill Stadium, Glasgow
15:00		Report	Rooney 34 pen.'	Attendance: 4,145; Referee: Willie Collum

3 December 2014 14	Celtic	1–0	Partick Thistle	Celtic Park, Glasgow
19:45	Van Dijk 60'	Report		Attendance: 40,633; Referee: Brian Colvin

6 December 2014 15	Partick Thistle	1–1	Kilmarnock	Firhill Stadium, Glasgow
15:00	Seaborne 19'	Report	Obadeyi 11'	Attendance: 3,054; Referee: Steven McLean

13 December 2014 16	Inverness CT	0–4	Partick Thistle	Caledonian Stadium, Inverness
15:00		Report	Stevenson 12', 40'; Fraser 49'; Balatoni 56'	Attendance: 2,723; Referee: John Beaton

20 December 2014 17	Partick Thistle	1–1	Dundee	Firhill Stadium, Glasgow
15:00	Craigen 58'	Report	Balatoni 90 o.g.'	Attendance: 3,203; Referee: Craig Thomson

27 December 2014 18	Motherwell	1–0	Partick Thistle	Fir Park, Motherwell
15:00	Sutton 14 pen.'	Report		Attendance: 5,236; Referee: Brian Colvin

4 January 2015 19	Partick Thistle	2–2	Dundee United	Firhill Stadium, Glasgow
15:00	Stevenson 24'; Doolan 32'	Report	Mackay-Steven 10'; Ciftci 73'	Attendance: 3,761; Referee: John Beaton

17 January 2015 20	St Johnstone	2–0	Partick Thistle	McDiarmid Park, Perth
15:00	Mackay 4'; Anderson 49'	Report		Attendance: 2,994; Referee: Greg Aitken

21 January 2015 21	Partick Thistle	5–0	Hamilton Academical	Firhill Stadium, Glasgow
19:45	Doolan 29', 44', 60', 62'; Eccleston 89'	Report		Attendance: 2,138; Referee: Craig Thomson

24 January 2015 22	Kilmarnock	2–2	Partick Thistle	Rugby Park, Kilmarnock
15:00	Magennis 33'; Pascali 79'	Report	Stevenson 2'; Frans 84'	Attendance: 4,130; Referee: Willie Collum

30 January 2015 23	Partick Thistle	0–1	St Mirren	Firhill Stadium, Glasgow
19:45		Report	Dayton 6'	Attendance: 3,864; Referee: Kevin Clancy

11 February 2015 24	Partick Thistle	0–3	Celtic	Firhill Stadium, Glasgow
19:45		Report	Mackay-Steven 1'; Armstrong 30'; Johanen 66'	Attendance: 5,776; Referee: Crawford Allan

14 February 2015 25	Dundee	1–0	Partick Thistle	Dens Park, Dundee
15:00	McGowan 90+1'	Report		Attendance: 5,560; Referee: Craig Thomson

21 February 2015 26	Partick Thistle	1–3	Ross County	Firhill Stadium, Glasgow
15:00	Taylor 68'	Report	Curran 11'; De Vita 65'; Fraser 71'	Attendance: 2,951; Referee: Stephen Finnie

28 February 2015 27	Dundee United	0–2	Partick Thistle	Tannadice Park, Dundee
15:00		Report	O'Donnell 34'; McGowan 41 o.g.'	Attendance: 6,517; Referee: Greg Aitken

7 March 2015 28	Ross County	1–0	Partick Thistle	Victoria Park, Dingwall
15:00	Craig Curran 33'	Report	Higginbotham (red card) 59'	Attendance: 3,358; Referee: Alan Muir

14 March 2015 29	Partick Thistle	3–0	St Johnstone	Firhill Stadium, Glasgow
15:00	Doolan 3'; Balatoni 9'; Bannigan 65'	Report		Attendance: 3,196; Referee: Willie Column

21 March 2015 30	Partick Thistle	1–0	Inverness CT	Firhill Stadium, Glasgow
15:00	Lawless 84'	Report		Attendance: 2,603; Referee: Steven McLean

4 April 2015 31	Aberdeen	0–0	Partick Thistle	Pittodrie Stadium, Aberdeen
15:00		Report		Attendance: 12,727; Referee: Kevin Clancy

8 April 2015 32	Celtic	2–0	Partick Thistle	Celtic Park, Glasgow
15:00	Commons 45 pen.' Johansen 63'	Report	Craigen (red card) 44'	Attendance: 43,784; Referee: Willie Collum

11 April 2015 33	Partick Thistle	2–0	Motherwell	Firhill Stadium, Glasgow
15:00	Taylor 54', 61'	Report	Carswell (red card) 89'	Attendance: 5,003; Referee: Bobby Madden

25 April 2015 34	Ross County	1–2	Partick Thistle	Victoria Park, Dingwall
15:00	Gardyne 21'	Report	Frans 26'; O'Donnell 54'	Attendance: 3,315; Referee: Don Robertson

2 May 2015 35	Partick Thistle	3–0	St Mirren	Firhill Stadium, Glasgow
15:00	Stevenson 68'; Doolan 82'; Lawless 90+1'	Report		Attendance: 3,865; Referee: Craig Thomson

9 May 2015 36	Hamilton Academical	1–1	Partick Thistle	New Douglas Park, Hamilton
15:00	Docherty 85'	Report	O'Donnell 72'	Attendance: 2,342; Referee: Stephen Finnie

16 May 2015 37	Partick Thistle	1–4	Kilmarnock	Firhill Stadium, Glasgow
15:00	Balatoni 67'	Report	Hamill 25'; Obadeyi 37', 63'; Magennis 71'	Attendance: 3,865; Referee: Craig Thomson

23 May 2015 38	Motherwell	0–0	Partick Thistle	Fir Park, Motherwell
15:00		Report		Attendance: 3,711; Referee: Steven McLean

=== Scottish League Cup ===
26 August 2014 Second Round	Greenock Morton	0–1	Partick Thistle	Cappielow, Greenock
19:45		Report	Doolan 45+1'	Attendance: 2,005; Referee: Steven McLean

23 September 2014 Third Round	Partick Thistle	1–0 (a.e.t.)	St Mirren	Firhill Stadium, Glasgow
19:45	Eccleston 100'	Report		Attendance: 1,879; Referee: Calum Murray

29 October 2014 Quarter-Final	Celtic	6–0	Partick Thistle	Celtic Park, Glasgow
19:45	Guidetti 31', 52', 56 pen.' Izaguirre 48'; Griffiths 62', 68'	Report	Bannigan (red card) 44'	Attendance: 16,805; Referee: Kevin Clancy

=== Scottish Cup ===
23 September 2014 Fourth Round	Partick Thistle	2–0	Hamilton Academical	Firhill Stadium, Glasgow
15:00	Stevenson 19', 54'	Report	Imrie (red card) 89'	Attendance: 2,467; Referee: Kevin Clancy

23 September 2014 Fifth Round	Partick Thistle	1–2	Inverness CT	Firhill Stadium, Glasgow
15:00	Taylor 67'	Report	Watkins 16'; Tansey 27'	Attendance: 2,915; Referee: Willie Collum

== Player statistics ==
As of 23 May 2015 (UTC)

No.	Pos	Nat	Player	Total		Premiership		League Cup		Scottish Cup	
No.	Pos	Nat	Player	Apps	Goals	Apps	Goals	Apps	Goals	Apps	Goals
1	GK	(Scotland) SCO	Scott Fox	24	0	22+0	0	0+0	0	2+0	0
2	DF	(Scotland) SCO	Stephen O'Donnell	38	5	34+0	5	2+0	0	2+0	0
3	DF	(England) ENG	Danny Seaborne	22	1	18+0	1	2+0	0	2+0	0
4	MF	(Scotland) SCO	Sean Welsh	3	0	1+2	0	0+0	0	0+0	0
5	DF	(Scotland) SCO	Callum Booth	14	0	14+0	0	0+0	0	0+0	0
6	DF	(England) ENG	Conrad Balatoni	35	3	32+0	3	0+0	0	3+0	0
7	MF	(England) ENG	James Craigen	31	2	19+7	2	0+2	0	3+0	0
8	MF	(Scotland) SCO	Stuart Bannigan	41	3	34+2	3	2+0	0	2+1	0
9	FW	(Scotland) SCO	Kris Doolan	40	10	18+17	9	0+2	0	2+1	1
10	FW	(Scotland) SCO	Ryan Stevenson	36	7	28+4	5	2+0	2	0+2	0
11	MF	(Scotland) SCO	Steven Lawless	38	3	28+5	3	1+1	0	3+0	0
12	GK	(Scotland) SCO	Paul Gallacher	21	0	16+2	0	2+0	0	1+0	0
13	DF	(Belgium) BEL	Frédéric Frans	22	2	20+0	2	2+0	0	0+0	0
14	MF	(England) ENG	Christie Elliott	31	2	18+8	2	2+0	0	1+2	0
15	MF	(England) ENG	Kallum Higginbotham	35	2	24+6	2	2+0	0	2+1	0
16	DF	(Scotland) SCO	Jordan McMillan	13	1	11+0	1	0+0	0	2+0	0
18	MF	(Ghana) GHA	Abdul Osman	39	1	34+0	1	2+0	0	3+0	0
21	DF	(England) ENG	Ben Richards-Everton	2	0	1+1	0	0+0	0	0+0	0
22	MF	(England) ENG	Gary Fraser	26	3	13+10	3	2+0	0	1+0	0
23	MF	(Scotland) SCO	David Wilson	6	0	1+5	0	0+0	0	0+0	0
24	DF	(Scotland) SCO	Jack Hendry	1	0	1+0	0	0+0	0	0+0	0
26	DF	(Scotland) SCO	Liam Lindsay	1	0	1+0	0	0+0	0	0+0	0
28	MF	(Scotland) SCO	Declan McDaid	16	3	5+11	3	0+0	0	0+0	0
29	FW	(Montserrat) MSR	Lyle Taylor	16	4	10+5	3	0+1	1	0+0	0
30	DF	(Scotland) SCO	Dale Keenan	6	3	4+1	3	0+0	0	1+0	0
33	FW	(Scotland) SCO	Neil McLaughlin	1	0	0+1	0	0+0	0	0+0	0
36	MF	(Australia) AUS	Chris Duggan	0	0	0+0	0	0+0	0	0+0	0
Players who left the club during the 2014–15 season
5	DF	(Scotland) SCO	Aaron Muirhead	6	0	3+2	0	0+0	0	1+0	0
17	DF	(Republic of Ireland) IRL	Jake Carroll	13	1	8+2	1	1+0	0	1+1	0
19	FW	(England) ENG	Nathan Eccleston	11	2	0+9	1	0+0	0	1+1	1

== Team statistics ==
=== League table ===
Pos	Team	Pld	W	D	L	GF	GA	GD	Pts
6	Dundee (Note: Teams in the bottom six at the time of the split (33 games) cannot pass teams in the top six)	38	11	12	15	46	57	−11	45
7	Hamilton Academical	38	15	8	15	50	53	−3	53
8	Partick Thistle	38	12	10	16	48	44	+4	46
9	Ross County	38	12	8	18	46	63	−17	44
10	Kilmarnock	38	11	8	19	44	59	−15	41

Source: SPFL
Rules for classification: 1) points; 2) goal difference; 3) number of goals scored

=== Division summary ===
Round	1	2	3	4	5	6	7	8	9	10	11	12	13	14	15	16	17	18	19	20	21	22	23	24	25	26	27	28	29	30	31	32	33	34	35	36	37	38
Ground	H	A	H	A	H	H	A	H	A	H	A	H	H	A	H	A	H	A	H	A	H	A	H	H	A	H	A	A	H	H	A	A	H	A	H	A	H	A
Result	W	D	L	L	W	L	L	W	L	D	D	W	L	L	D	W	D	L	D	L	W	D	L	L	L	L	W	L	W	W	D	L	W	W	W	D	L	D
Position	4	5	8	9	8	9	9	7	8	8	9	8	9	9	9	9	9	9	9	9	9	9	9	9	9	9	9	9	9	9	9	9	8	8	8	8	8	8

Updated to match(es) played on 23 May 2015. Source:
A = Away; H = Home; W = Win; D = Draw; L = Loss
