= Bradley Halsman =

Scottish footballer

Personal information
- Date of birth: 12 April 1993 (age 33)
- Place of birth: Glasgow, Scotland
- Height: 1.85 m (6 ft 1 in)
- Position: Midfielder

Team information
- Current team: Nairn County

Youth career
- Aberdeen
- –2011: Motherwell
- 2011–2012: Partick Thistle

Senior career*
| Years | Team | Apps | (Gls) |
| 2012–2013 | Partick Thistle | 1 | (0) |
| 2012–2013 | → Albion Rovers (loan) | 7 | (0) |
- * Club domestic league appearances and goals as of 7 February 2014

Bradley Halsman (born 12 April 1993) is a Scottish footballer, who plays as a midfielder for Nairn County in the Highland League.

== Career ==
Halsman began his career as a youth player with Aberdeen, before joining Motherwell where he was captain of their under 17–squad.

=== Partick Thistle ===
He was released by Motherwell in June 2011, before joining Scottish First Division side Partick Thistle on a Modern Apprenticeship deal, where he initially joined up with their under 19–squad. On 28 April 2012, he was promoted to the first team where he made his debut from the start in a 1–1 draw with Falkirk.

In November 2012, Halsman joined Albion Rovers on loan until 6 January 2013. After making five appearances so far, Halsman loan spell was extended until 20 February 2013. After making seven appearances, Halsman returned to Partick Thistle.

In conclusion of 2012–13 season, Halsman was released along with many youngsters as Partick Thistle prepares to play in the Scottish Premier League.

=== Nairn County ===
After appearing as a trialist for a few games, Halsman signed for Nairn County in 2014.

=== Career statistics ===
As of 4 August 2012

Club statistics
| Club | Season | Division | League | | Scottish Cup | | League Cup | | Other | | Total | |
| Club | Season | Division | App | Goals | App | Goals | App | Goals | App | Goals | App | Goals |
|---|---|---|---|---|---|---|---|---|---|---|---|---|
| Partick Thistle | 2011–12 | SFL1 | 1 | 0 | 0 | 0 | 0 | 0 | 0 | 0 | 1 | 0 |
| Partick Thistle | 2012–13 | SFL1 | 0 | 0 | 0 | 0 | 1 | 0 | 0 | 0 | 1 | 0 |
| Total | | | 1 | 0 | 0 | 0 | 1 | 0 | 0 | 0 | 2 | 0 |

== Personal life ==
He is the brother of fellow footballer Jordan Halsman.
