= Sean Welsh =

Scottish footballer (born 1990)

Personal information
- Date of birth: 15 March 1990 (age 36)
- Place of birth: Edinburgh, Scotland
- Position: Midfielder

Team information
- Current team: The Spartans
- Number: 4

Youth career
- Hibernian

Senior career*
Years	Team	Apps	(Gls)
2010–2012	Hibernian	0	(0)
2010	→ Stenhousemuir (loan)	2	(0)
2011	→ Stirling Albion (loan)	17	(1)
2012	→ Partick Thistle (loan)	12	(2)
2012–2017	Partick Thistle	93	(6)
2018	Falkirk	11	(0)
2018–2024	Inverness Caledonian Thistle	109	(12)
2024–2025	Queen's Park	48	(4)
2025–	The Spartans	24	(0)
- * Club domestic league appearances and goals as of 4 May 2026

Sean Welsh (born 15 March 1990) is a Scottish footballer, who plays as a midfielder for The Spartans. He has previously played for Hibernian, Stenhousemuir, Stirling Albion, Partick Thistle, Falkirk and Inverness Caledonian Thistle.

== Career ==
=== Hibernian ===
A lifelong Hibs fan, Welsh was captain of the Hibs under-19 squad who won a league and cup double in 2008–09. He was awarded under 19 League Player of the Season. A series of injuries, including a double leg break, limited his first team chances Welsh was sent on loan spells at Stenhousemuir and Stirling Albion. In May 2011, Welsh agreed a new one-year contract with Hibs.

In July 2011, Welsh was punched during a training session by teammate Martin Scott, which resulted in Welsh needing four operations to repair a fractured cheekbone. During one operation he suffered an infection that threatened his eyesight, but he recovered. Once recovered Welsh was an unused substitute on eight occasions and joined Partick Thistle on loan to play in more matches. After returning from his loan to Thistle, Welsh was released at the end of his contract in May 2012.

=== Stenhousemuir (loan) ===
Welsh joined Scottish Second Division club Stenhousemuir on a month's loan in January 2010 along with fellow youngster Lee Currie. He made his debut as a 61st-minute substitute against Dunfermline in the Scottish Cup, with his league debut coming on 16 January 2010 playing from the start against Arbroath. In all he made 3 appearances for the club.

=== Stirling (loan) ===
In February 2011 Welsh Scottish First Division club Stirling Albion on loan, going on to make his debut on 19 February as a substitute in their 1–0 defeat to Dundee. He scored his first goal for the club on 5 March 2011 scoring the opening goal in a 4–3 defeat to Cowdenbeath. In all he made 17 appearances scoring once. In November Stirling tried to bring Welsh back for a second loan spell however this was rejected by Hibs.

=== Partick Thistle ===
After impressing in training on 7 February 2012 Welsh joined Scottish First Division club Partick Thistle on loan until the end of March. He made his debut from the start on 11 February against Livingston. Welsh's initial spell was disrupted by injury, and on 30 March 2012 after 5 appearances, his loan was extended until the end of the season.

After Welsh was released by Hibs in May 2012, he signed a two-year contract with Partick Thistle. Welsh played an integral part in guiding Thistle to the 2012–13 Scottish First Division championship, which led to the Jags being promoted to the top flight for the first time in nine years.

Welsh was handed the Thistle captaincy before the start of the 2013–14 Scottish Premiership season. On 14 August, Welsh extended his contract with Thistle until the end of the 2014/15 season. He struggled with a knee injury during the 2013–14 season. The Thistle captaincy was handed to Paul Gallacher whilst Welsh remained out. Welsh made his return for Thistle in November 2014, starting against St Mirren in Paisley. However, during the match, Welsh suffered a further knee injury, which kept him out for a further month.

He also struggled with further injuries during the 2014/15 season, as he made only three first team appearances. Welsh and Partick Thistle agreed to a short-term extension to his contract in June 2015, in an effort to prove his fitness. Welsh scored his first goal in the top flight converting thistle's first penalty in 69 games in a 2–1 defeat against Celtic. Welsh scored his first goal of the 2016–17 season converting a first half penalty in a 1–1 draw with Ross county at Firhill. Welsh scored his second goal of the 2016–17 season, his first in open play since Partick Thistle's promotion in 2013, scoring the equaliser in a 1–1 draw away to Hamilton Accidemical. Welsh left Thistle in May 2017, after his contract with the club ended.

=== Falkirk ===
After almost eight months without a club, Welsh signed with struggling Scottish Championship side Falkirk on a short-term deal. Welsh left Falkirk at the end of the 2017–18 season.

=== Inverness Caledonian Thistle ===
Soon after leaving Falkirk, Welsh joined fellow Championship side Inverness Caledonian Thistle. Welsh scored his first goal for the club in August 2018, as he scored a penalty against Alloa Athletic F.C.

=== Queen's Park ===
On 12 January 2024, Welsh mutually terminated his contract at Inverness CT and joined Queen's Park, scoring on his debut in a 2–1 away win to league leaders, Raith Rovers.

== Career statistics ==
As of match played 30 April 2021

Appearances and goals by club, season and competition
Club	Season	League			Scottish Cup		League Cup		Other		Total	
Club	Season	Division	Apps	Goals	Apps	Goals	Apps	Goals	Apps	Goals	Apps	Goals
Stenhousemuir	2009–10	Second Division	2	0	1	0	0	0	0	0	3	0
Stirling Albion	2010–11	First Division	17	1	0	0	0	0	0	0	17	1
Partick Thistle (loan)	2011–12	First Division	12	2	0	0	0	0	0	0	12	2
Partick Thistle	2012–13	First Division	25	2	0	0	2	0	3 (Note: Appearance(s) in the Scottish Challenge Cup)	0	30	2
Partick Thistle	2013–14	Premiership	10	0	1	0	2	0	—		13	0
Partick Thistle	2014–15	Premiership	3	0	0	0	0	0	—		3	0
Partick Thistle	2015–16	Premiership	34	1	2	0	0	0	—		36	1
Partick Thistle	2016–17	Premiership	21	3	2	0	5	2	—		28	5
Partick Thistle	Total		105	8	5	0	9	2	3	0	122	10
Falkirk	2017–18	Championship	11	0	0	0	0	0	0	0	11	0
Inverness Caledonian Thistle	2018–19	Championship	28	4	5	0	0	0	1	0	34	4
Inverness Caledonian Thistle	2019–20	Championship	5	2	1	1	0	0	1	0	7	3
Inverness Caledonian Thistle	2020–21	Championship	21	1	3	1	2	0	0	0	26	2
Inverness Caledonian Thistle	Total		54	7	9	2	2	0	2	0	67	9
Career total			189	16	15	2	11	2	5	0	220	20

== Honours ==
Partick Thistle

- Scottish First Division: 2012/13

Inverness CT

- Scottish Cup Runner Up: 2023

Queen's Park

- Scottish Challenge Cup runner-up: 2024–25
