= 2012–13 Partick Thistle F.C. season =

Partick Thistle
2012–13 season
- Chairman: David Beattie
- Manager: Jackie McNamara (Until 30 January 2013); Alan Archibald (From 30 January 2013)
- Stadium: Firhill Stadium
- First Division: First place
- Challenge Cup: Final, lost to Queen of the South
- League Cup: Second round, lost to Hamilton Academical
- Scottish Cup: Fourth round, lost to Dunfermline Athletic
- Top goalscorer: League: Kris Doolan (13); Steven Lawless (13); All: Kris Doolan (15); Chris Erskine (15)
- Highest home attendance: 8,875 vs. Greenock Morton, First Division, 10 April 2013
- Lowest home attendance: 1,807 vs. Raith Rovers, Challenge Cup, 19 February 2013
- Average home league attendance: League: 3,705
Home colours	Away colours

The 2012–13 season was Partick Thistle's seventh consecutive season in the Scottish First Division, having been promoted from the Scottish Second Division at the end of the 2005–06 season. Partick Thistle also competed in the Challenge Cup, League Cup and the Scottish Cup.

== Summary ==
=== Season ===
Partick Thistle finished first in the Scottish First Division, and were promoted to the Scottish Premier League. They reached the final of the Challenge Cup, losing 6–5 on penalties to Queen of the South, the second round of the League Cup and the fourth round of the Scottish Cup.

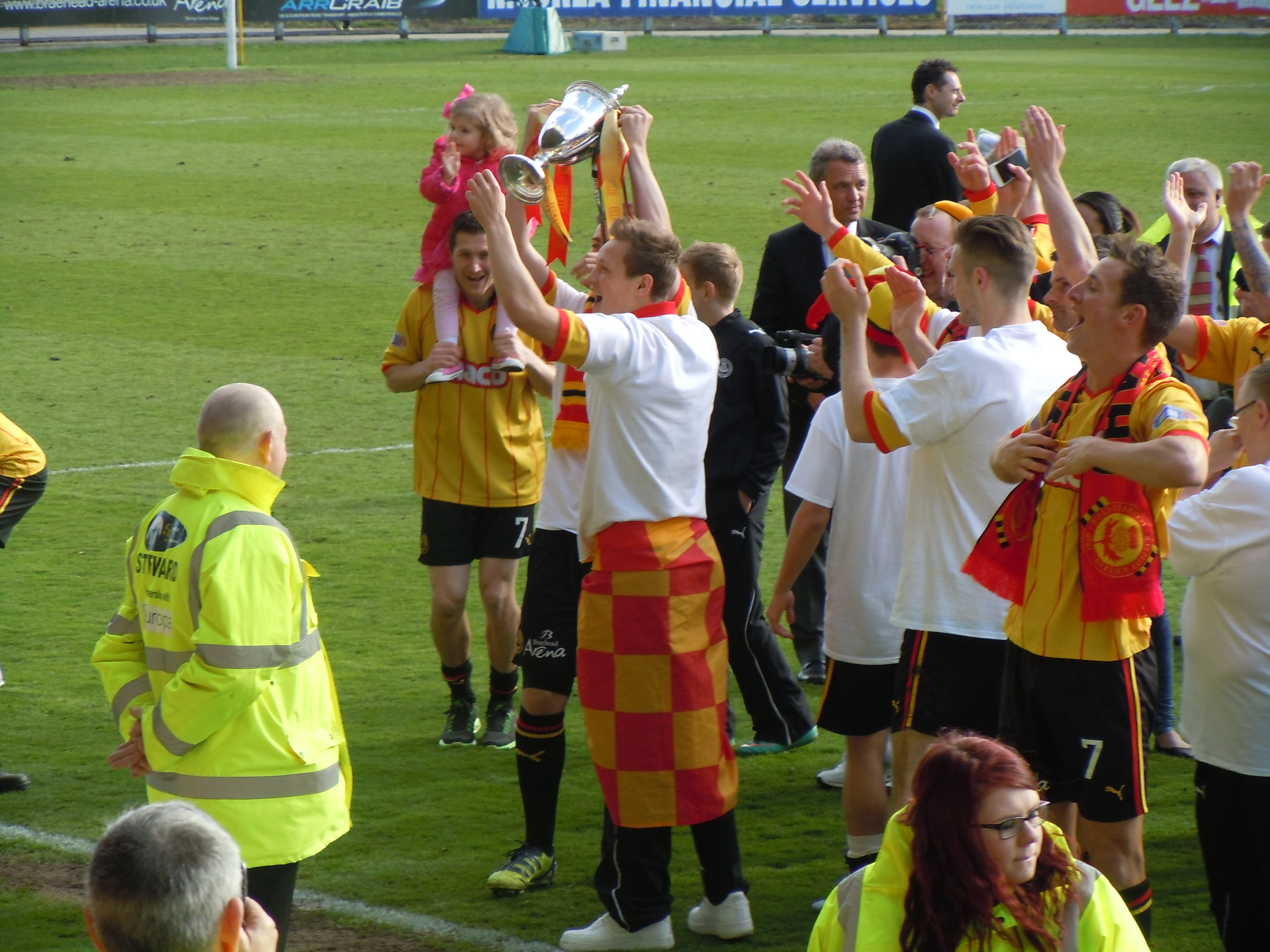
Thistle are crowned champions. James Craigen holds the trophy.

=== Management ===
Thistle began the season under the management of Jackie McNamara. On 29 January 2013, the club gave permission to Dundee United to speak to McNamara about becoming their new manager. The following day McNamara and his assistant Simon Donnelly resigned, to become the new management team at United. Later the same day the club announced that Alan Archibald and Scott Paterson would take over as the club's interim management team. On 22 March, the duo were given the job on a permanent basis signing a one-year rolling contract.

== Results and fixtures ==
Win Draw Loss Postponed

=== Preseason ===
10 July 2012 Friendly	Alloa Athletic	1 – 2	Partick Thistle	Recreation Park
	Munn 52'	Partick Report	Lawless 26'; Sinclair 50'

17 July 2012 Friendly	Ayr United	1 – 4	Partick Thistle	Somerset Park
19:45	Kasubandi 34'	Partick Report	Welsh 8'; Lawless 76', 84'; Elliott 81'

21 July 2012 ARR Craib Cup	Partick Thistle	2 – 0	Celtic XI	Firhill Stadium
12:00	Welsh 32'; Lawless 49'	Celtic Report

22 July 2012 ARR Craib Cup Final	Partick Thistle	3 – 1	Everton XI	Firhill Stadium
14:45	Welsh 2', 48' (pen.) Bannigan 54'		McAleny 52'

=== Scottish First Division ===
11 August 2012 Scottish First Division	Partick Thistle	3 – 1	Falkirk	Firhill Stadium
15:00	Lawless 4'; Doolan 7', 57'	SFL Report	Taylor 53'	Attendance: 3,487; Referee: Salmond

18 August 2012 Scottish First Division	Dunfermline Athletic	0 – 1	Partick Thistle	East End Park
15:00		SFL Report	Lawless 24'	Attendance: 3,540; Referee: Brines

25 August 2012 Scottish First Division	Partick Thistle	3 – 0	Dumbarton	Firhill Stadium
15:00	Doolan 16'; Erskine 63'; Bannigan 70'	SFL Report		Attendance: 2,944; Referee: Finnie

1 September 2012 Scottish First Division	Partick Thistle	4 – 0	Hamilton Academical	Firhill Stadium
15:00	Welsh 41'; Craig 56', 86'; Lawless 65'	SFL Report		Attendance: 2,603; Referee: McLean

15 September 2012 Scottish First Division	Livingston	1 – 2	Partick Thistle	Almondvale Stadium
15:00	Morton 59'	SFL Report	Lawless 38', 48'	Attendance: 1,745; Referee: Thomson

22 September 2012 Scottish First Division	Partick Thistle	2 – 1	Cowdenbeath	Firhill Stadium
15:00	Muirhead 25' (Penalty); Linton 70' (Own goal)	SFL Report	Stevenson 49'	Attendance: 2,510; Referee: Collum

29 September 2012 Scottish First Division	Raith Rovers	1 – 1	Partick Thistle	Stark's Park
15:00	Spence 66'	BBC Report; Partick Report	Doolan 90'	Attendance: 1,957; Referee: Clancy

6 October 2012 Scottish First Division	Greenock Morton	3 – 1	Partick Thistle	Cappielow
15:00	Rutkiewicz 14'; McLaughlin 39'; O'Brien 86'	SFL Report	Craig 20'; Murray (yellow card) 55' (yellow-red card)	Attendance: 3,445; Referee: Roache

20 October 2012 Scottish First Division	Partick Thistle	7 – 0	Airdrie United	Firhill Stadium
15:00	Erskine 4', 45'; Muirhead 11' (Penalty); Lawless 30'; Welsh 42'; Doolan 57'; Forbes 80'	SFL Report	Sally (red card) 76'	Attendance: 2,545; Referee: Norris

27 October 2012 Scottish First Division	Falkirk	0 – 0	Partick Thistle	Falkirk Stadium
15:00		SFL Report		Attendance: 3,818; Referee: Madden

10 November 2012 Scottish First Division	Partick Thistle	5 – 1	Dunfermline Athletic	Firhill Stadium
15:00	Lawless 5', 75'; Balatoni 34'; O'Donnell 39'; Forbes 56'	BBC Report	Muirhead 24' (Own goal)	Attendance: 5,268; Referee: Murray

16 November 2012 Scottish First Division	Hamilton Academical	1 – 0	Partick Thistle	New Douglas Park
19:45	Smith 41' (Own goal)	BBC Report; SFL Report	Paton (red card) 75'	Attendance: 2,450; Referee: Finnie

24 November 2012 Scottish First Division	Partick Thistle	2 – 0	Livingston	Firhill Stadium
15:00	Sinclair 54'; Bannigan 63'	SFL Report		Attendance: 2,508; Referee: McKendrick

8 December 2012 Scottish First Division	Cowdenbeath	P – P	Partick Thistle	Central Park
15:00		BBC Report

15 December 2012 Scottish First Division	Partick Thistle	3 – 2	Raith Rovers	Firhill Stadium
15:00	Bannigan 21'; Lawless 32'; Craig 87'	SFL Report	Spence 13'; Graham 81'	Attendance: 2,221; Referee: Clancy

26 December 2012 Scottish First Division	Partick Thistle	1 – 2	Greenock Morton	Firhill Stadium
15:00	Craig 28'; Forbes (yellow card) 70' (yellow-red card)	SFL Report	Hardie 64'; Taggart 84'	Attendance: 4,955; Referee: Madden

29 December 2012 Scottish First Division	Airdrie United	1 – 1	Partick Thistle	Excelsior Stadium
15:00	Boyle 41'	SFL Report	Erskine 79'	Attendance: 1,617; Referee: Muir

2 January 2013 Scottish First Division	Partick Thistle	P – P	Hamilton Academical	Firhill Stadium
15:00		BBC Report
Note: Postponed due to waterlogged pitch

5 January 2013 Scottish First Division	Livingston	2 – 2	Partick Thistle	Almondvale Stadium
15:00	Andreu 29'; McNulty 90+2'	SFL Report	Doolan 25'; Craig 32'; Welsh (red card) 89'	Attendance: 1,762; Referee: Salmond

12 January 2013 Scottish First Division	Dumbarton	2 – 0	Partick Thistle	Dumbarton Football Stadium
15:00	Balatoni 21' (Own goal); Prunty 63'	SFL Report		Attendance: 1,530; Referee: Roache

19 January 2013 Scottish First Division	Partick Thistle	4 – 1	Falkirk	Firhill Stadium
15:00	Balatoni 4', 62'; Erskine 20', 64'	SFL Report	Taylor 18'	Attendance: 3,280; Referee: Beaton

26 January 2013 Scottish First Division	Partick Thistle	2 – 1	Cowdenbeath	Firhill Stadium
15:00	Craig 25'; Balatoni 44'	SFL Report	Hemmings 9'	Attendance: 2,543; Referee: Allan

2 February 2013 Scottish First Division	Cowdenbeath	P – P	Partick Thistle	Central Park
15:00		BBC Report
Note: Postponed due to a waterlogged pitch

9 February 2013 Scottish First Division	Raith Rovers	P – P	Partick Thistle	Stark's Park
15:00		BBC Report
Note: Postponed due to a waterlogged pitch

16 February 2013 Scottish First Division	Greenock Morton	2 – 2	Partick Thistle	Cappielow
15:00	MacDonald 57', 81' (Penalty)	SFL Report	Erskine 9'; Craig 46'; Murray (yellow card) 84' (yellow-red card)	Attendance: 5,647; Referee: Norris

19 February 2013 Scottish First Division	Partick Thistle	1 – 0	Hamilton Academical	Firhill Stadium
19:45	Muirhead 55' (Penalty)	SFL Report		Attendance: 2,046; Referee: McKendrick

23 February 2013 Scottish First Division	Partick Thistle	1 – 0	Airdrie United	Firhill Stadium
15:00	Erskine 76'	SFL Report		Attendance: 3,021; Referee: Tumilty

26 February 2013 Scottish First Division	Cowdenbeath	A – A	Partick Thistle	Central Park
19:45	Moore 4', 64'	SFL Report	Lawless 23'	Attendance: 719; Referee: Charleston
Note: Abandoned due to fog

2 March 2013 Scottish First Division	Dunfermline Athletic	0 – 4	Partick Thistle	East End Park
15:00		SFL Report	Craig 4', 22', 33'; Forbes 15'	Attendance: 2,822; Referee: Madden

9 March 2013 Scottish First Division	Partick Thistle	3 – 0	Dumbarton	Firhill Stadium
15:00	Lawless 9', 74'; Doolan 81'	SFL Report		Attendance: 2,715; Referee: Brines

12 March 2013 Scottish First Division	Raith Rovers	P – P	Partick Thistle	Stark's Park
19:45		BBC Report
Note: Postponed due to a frozen pitch

16 March 2013 Scottish First Division	Hamilton Academical	0 – 2	Partick Thistle	New Douglas Park
15:00		SFL Report	Balatoni 44'; Elliott 84'	Attendance: 1,852; Referee: Finnie

19 March 2013 Scottish First Division	Cowdenbeath	P – P	Partick Thistle	Central Park
19:45		BBC Report
Note: Postponed due to snow

23 March 2013 Scottish First Division	Partick Thistle	6 – 1	Livingston	Firhill Stadium
15:00	Muirhead 19' (Penalty); Craig 22'; Craigen 36'; Lawless 43'; Erskine 57'; Doolan 69'	SFL Report	Watson 45'	Attendance: 2,897; Referee: Salmond

27 March 2013 Scottish First Division	Cowdenbeath	0 – 3	Partick Thistle	Central Park
19:45	O'Brien (red card) 70'	SFL Report	O'Donnell 24'; Doolan 30', 79'	Attendance: 716; Referee: Charleston

30 March 2013 Scottish First Division	Cowdenbeath	1 – 2	Partick Thistle	Central Park
15:00	Moore 31'	SFL Report	Doolan 12', 62'	Attendance: 1,214; Referee: Muir

2 April 2013 Scottish First Division	Raith Rovers	0 – 0	Partick Thistle	Stark's Park
19:45		SFL Report	Muirhead (yellow card) 58' (yellow-red card)	Attendance: 1,761; Referee: Murray

10 April 2013 Scottish First Division	Partick Thistle	1 – 0	Greenock Morton	Firhill Stadium
19:45	Craigen 41'	SFL Report		Attendance: 8,875; Referee: Colvin
Note: Kick of delayed to 20:00 due to large crowd still waiting to get in

13 April 2013 Scottish First Division	Airdrie United	1 – 2	Partick Thistle	Excelsior Stadium
15:00	Watt 35'	SFL Report	Balatoni 89'; Elliott 90+1'	Attendance: 1,648; Referee: Robertson

16 April 2013 Scottish First Division	Partick Thistle	0 – 0	Raith Rovers	Firhill Stadium
19:45		SFL Report		Attendance: 4,963; Referee: Clancy

20 April 2013 Scottish First Division	Falkirk	0 – 2	Partick Thistle	Falkirk Stadium
15:00		SFL Report	Dowie 50'; Doolan 78'	Attendance: 4,804; Referee: Finnie

27 April 2013 Scottish First Division	Partick Thistle	3 – 3	Dunfermline Athletic	Firhill Stadium
15:00	McMillan 27'; Erskine 84'; Lawless 90+5'	SFL Report	Wallace 65'; Geggan 72'; Thomson 80'	Attendance: 5,663; Referee: Collum

4 May 2013 Scottish First Division	Dumbarton	0 – 0	Partick Thistle	Dumbarton Football Stadium
15:00		SFL Report; Partick Report		Attendance: 1,528; Referee: Beaton

=== Scottish Challenge Cup ===
28 July 2012 Scottish Challenge Cup round 1	Clyde	0 – 1	Partick Thistle	Recreation Park
15:00		SFL Report	Doolan 73'	Attendance: 1,065; Referee: Muir

14 August 2012 Scottish Challenge Cup round 2	Queens Park	4 – 5	Partick Thistle	Hampden Park
19:30	Shankland 18'; Longworth 53'; Quinn 78'; Little 85'	SFL Report	Sinclair 34'; Elliott 40'; Erskine 65', 90'; Bannigan 90'	Attendance: 1,605; Referee: Allan

9 September 2012 Scottish Challenge Cup QF	Partick Thistle	3 – 0	Raith Rovers	Firhill Stadium
16:05	Erskine 50', 58'; Craig 53'	SFL Report		Attendance: 1,807; Referee: Charleston

14 October 2012 Scottish Challenge Cup SF	Cowdenbeath	0 – 1	Partick Thistle	Central Park
16:05		SFL Report	Craig 74'	Attendance: 1,159; Referee: McKendrick

7 April 2013 Scottish Challenge Cup Final	Queen of the South	1 – 1 (a.e.t.) (6 – 5 p)	Partick Thistle	Braidwood Motor Company Stadium
16:05	Clark 101'	SFL Report	Muirhead (red card) 119'; Doolan 120'	Attendance: 9,452; Referee: Allan
	Penalties
	Young (penalty scored); Carmichael (penalty missed); Fitzpatrick (penalty scored); Robinson (penalty scored); Reilly (penalty scored); Mitchell (penalty scored); Higgins (penalty scored)		(penalty missed) O'Donnell; (penalty scored) Erskine; (penalty scored) Welsh; (penalty scored) Sinclair; (penalty scored) Forbes; (penalty scored) Doolan; (penalty missed) Balatoni

=== Scottish League Cup ===
4 August 2012 Scottish League Cup round 1	Forfar Athletic	0 – 2	Partick Thistle	Station Park
15:00		SFL Report	Erskine 18'; Lawless 37'; Murray (red card) 44'	Attendance: 693; Referee: Northcroft

28 August 2012 Scottish League Cup round 2	Hamilton Academical	1 – 0 (a.e.t.)	Partick Thistle	New Douglas Park
19:45	Crawford 107'	SFL Report		Attendance: 1,268; Referee: O'Reilly

=== Scottish Cup ===
3 November 2012 Scottish Cup round 3	Partick Thistle	2 – 1	Cove Rangers	Firhill Stadium
15:00	Forbes 13'; Craig (red card) 27'; Redford 38' (o.g.)	BBC Report	Milne 86'	Attendance: 1,957; Referee: Tumilty

1 December 2012 Scottish Cup round 4	Partick Thistle	0 – 1	Dunfermline Athletic	Firhill Stadium
15:00	Muirhead (red card) 27'	BBC Report	Barrowman 35'; Barrowman (red card) 90'	Attendance: 3,197; Referee: McLean

== Player statistics ==
=== Captains ===
No.	P	Name	Country	No. games	Notes
	DF	Archibald	(Scotland)	22	Club captain
	MF	Paton	(Scotland)	8	Club captain
	MF	Murray	(Scotland)	2	Club captain
	FW	Craig	(Scotland)	5	Club captain
	MF	Erskine	(Scotland)	6	Club captain

Last updated: 4 May 2013
Source: Competitive match reports.
Competitive matches only
Matches started as captain only
Country: FIFA nationality; No.: Squad number; P: Position; Name: Player name; No. Games: Number of games started as captain.

=== Squad ===
Last updated 4 May 2013

No.	Pos	Nat	Player	Total		First Division		Challenge Cup		League Cup		Scottish Cup	
No.	Pos	Nat	Player	Apps	Goals	Apps	Goals	Apps	Goals	Apps	Goals	Apps	Goals
	GK	(Belgium) BEL	Glenn Daniels	1	0	1+0	0	0+0	0	0+0	0	0+0	0
	GK	(Scotland) SCO	Scott Fox	36	0	29+0	0	4+0	0	2+0	0	1+0	0
	GK	(Scotland) SCO	Ryan Scully	2	0	0+1	0	1+0	0	0+0	0	0+0	0
	GK	(Scotland) SCO	Graeme Smith	7	0	6+0	0	0+0	0	0+0	0	1+0	0
	DF	(Scotland) SCO	Alan Archibald	22	0	17+0	0	2+0	0	2+0	0	0+1	0
	DF	(England) ENG	Conrad Balatoni	35	6	28+1	6	3+1	0	0+0	0	2+0	0
	DF	(Scotland) SCO	Andy Dowie	5	1	5+0	1	0+0	0	0+0	0	0+0	0
	DF	(Scotland) SCO	Liam Lindsay	1	0	1+0	0	0+0	0	0+0	0	0+0	0
	DF	(Scotland) SCO	Jordan McMillan	3	1	2+1	1	0+0	0	0+0	0	0+0	0
	DF	(Scotland) SCO	Aaron Muirhead	39	4	29+1	4	5+0	0	2+0	0	2+0	0
	DF	(Scotland) SCO	Stephen O’Donnell	37	2	26+2	2	5+0	0	2+0	0	2+0	0
	DF	(Scotland) SCO	Paul Paton	30	0	24+0	0	4+0	0	1+0	0	1+0	0
	DF	(Scotland) SCO	Aaron Sinclair	40	2	28+5	1	2+1	1	2+0	0	2+0	0
	MF	(Scotland) SCO	Stuart Bannigan	41	4	32+1	3	5+0	1	2+0	0	1+0	0
	MF	(Scotland) SCO	Jonathan Black	1	0	0+1	0	0+0	0	0+0	0	0+0	0
	MF	(Scotland) SCO	Jamie Campbell	0	0	0+0	0	0+0	0	0+0	0	0+0	0
	MF	(Scotland) SCO	Chris Erskine	43	15	31+3	10	4+1	4	2+0	1	2+0	0
	MF	(Scotland) SCO	Ross Forbes	30	4	22+4	3	1+1	0	0+0	0	2+0	1
	MF	(Scotland) SCO	Bradley Halsman	1	0	0+0	0	0+0	0	0+1	0	0+0	0
	MF	(Scotland) SCO	Steven Lawless	44	14	30+5	13	4+1	0	2+0	1	2+0	0
	MF	(Scotland) SCO	Jordan Leyden	1	0	0+1	0	0+0	0	0+0	0	0+0	0
	MF	(Northern Ireland) NIR	Caolan McAleer	0	0	0+0	0	0+0	0	0+0	0	0+0	0
	MF	(Scotland) SCO	Hugh Murray	16	0	12+0	0	2+0	0	1+0	0	1+0	0
	MF	(Scotland) SCO	David Rowson	1	0	0+0	0	0+0	0	0+0	0	0+1	0
	MF	(Scotland) SCO	Paul Slane	4	0	0+2	0	0+1	0	0+0	0	0+1	0
	MF	(Scotland) SCO	Sean Welsh	32	2	22+3	2	5+0	0	2+0	0	0+0	0
	MF	(Scotland) SCO	David Wilson	1	0	0+1	0	0+0	0	0+0	0	0+0	0
	FW	(Scotland) SCO	Steven Craig	30	14	18+7	12	3+0	2	0+0	0	1+1	0
	FW	(England) ENG	James Craigen	24	2	10+9	2	2+1	0	0+2	0	0+0	0
	FW	(Scotland) SCO	Kris Doolan	41	15	18+15	13	0+4	2	2+0	0	2+0	0
	FW	(England) ENG	Christie Elliott	28	3	4+17	2	3+2	1	0+1	0	0+1	0
	FW	(Scotland) SCO	Mark McGuigan	16	0	1+11	0	1+0	0	0+2	0	0+1	0

=== Disciplinary record ===
Includes all competitive matches.

Last updated 4 May 2013

Nation	Position	Name	First Division		Challenge Cup		League Cup		Scottish Cup		Total	
Nation	Position	Name	Booked	Sent off (straight red)	Booked	Sent off (straight red)	Booked	Sent off (straight red)	Booked	Sent off (straight red)	Booked	Sent off (straight red)
(Belgium)	GK	Glenn Daniels	0	0	0	0	0	0	0	0	0	0
(Scotland)	GK	Scott Fox	1	0	0	0	0	0	0	0	1	0
(Scotland)	GK	Ryan Scully	0	0	0	0	0	0	0	0	0	0
(Scotland)	GK	Graeme Smith	0	0	0	0	0	0	0	0	0	0
(Scotland)	DF	Alan Archibald	1	0	0	0	0	0	0	0	1	0
(England)	DF	Conrad Balatoni	1	0	0	0	0	0	1	0	2	0
(Scotland)	DF	Andy Dowie	0	0	0	0	0	0	0	0	0	0
(Scotland)	DF	Liam Lindsay	0	0	0	0	0	0	0	0	0	0
(Scotland)	DF	Jordan McMillan	2	0	0	0	0	0	0	0	2	0
(Scotland)	DF	Aaron Muirhead	3	1	0	1	0	0	0	1	3	3
(Scotland)	DF	Stephen O’Donnell	0	0	0	0	0	0	0	0	0	0
(Scotland)	DF	Paul Paton	7	1	1	0	0	0	0	0	8	1
(Scotland)	DF	Aaron Sinclair	2	0	1	0	0	0	0	0	3	0
(Scotland)	MF	Stuart Bannigan	7	0	1	0	1	0	0	0	9	0
(Scotland)	MF	Jonathan Black	0	0	0	0	0	0	0	0	0	0
(Scotland)	MF	Jamie Campbell	0	0	0	0	0	0	0	0	0	0
(Scotland)	MF	Chris Erskine	3	0	0	0	0	0	0	0	3	0
(Scotland)	MF	Ross Forbes	2	1	0	0	0	0	0	0	2	1
(Scotland)	MF	Bradley Halsman	0	0	0	0	0	0	0	0	0	0
(Scotland)	MF	Steven Lawless	2	0	0	0	1	0	0	0	3	0
(Scotland)	MF	Jordan Leyden	0	0	0	0	0	0	0	0	0	0
(Northern Ireland)	MF	Caolan McAleer	0	0	0	0	0	0	0	0	0	0
(Scotland)	MF	Hugh Murray	5	2	1	0	0	1	0	0	6	3
(Scotland)	MF	David Rowson	0	0	0	0	0	0	0	0	0	0
(Scotland)	MF	Paul Slane	0	0	0	0	0	0	1	0	1	0
(Scotland)	MF	Sean Welsh	2	1	1	0	0	0	0	0	3	1
(Scotland)	MF	David Wilson	0	0	0	0	0	0	0	0	0	0
(Scotland)	FW	Steven Craig	2	0	0	0	0	0	0	1	2	1
(England)	FW	James Craigen	0	0	1	0	0	0	0	0	1	0
(Scotland)	FW	Kris Doolan	0	0	0	0	0	0	0	0	0	0
(England)	FW	Christie Elliott	0	0	2	0	0	0	0	0	2	0
(Scotland)	FW	Mark McGuigan	0	0	0	0	0	0	0	0	0	0

=== Awards ===
Last updated 3 May 2013

Nation	Name	Award	Month
(Scotland)	Jackie McNamara	First Division Manager of the Month	August
(Scotland)	Steven Lawless	Young Player of the Month	August
(Scotland)	Stuart Bannigan	Young Player of the Month	January
(Scotland)	Alan Archibald	First Division Manager of the Month	February
(Scotland)	Alan Archibald	First Division Manager of the Month	March
(Scotland)	Kris Doolan	Player of the Month	March
(Scotland)	Scott Fox, Stephen O’Donnell, Aaron Sinclair, Stuart Bannigan & Chris Erskine (Note: Jordan McMillan was also included but for his time as a Dunfermline Athletic player.)	PFA Scotland First Division Team of the Year	Season

== Team statistics ==
=== League table ===
Pos	Team	Pld	W	D	L	GF	GA	GD	Pts	Promotion or relegation
1	Partick Thistle (C, P)	36	23	9	4	76	28	+48	78	Promotion to the Premiership
2	Greenock Morton	36	20	7	9	73	47	+26	67	
3	Falkirk	36	15	8	13	52	48	+4	53	
4	Livingston	36	14	10	12	58	56	+2	52	
5	Hamilton Academical	36	14	9	13	52	45	+7	51	

Source: SPFL Archive
Rules for classification: 1) points; 2) goal difference; 3) number of goals scored.
(C) Champions; (P) Promoted

=== Division summary ===
Round	1	2	3	4	5	6	7	8	9	10	11	12	13	14	15	16	17	18	19	20	21	22	23	24	25	26	27	28	29	30	31	32	33	34	35	36
Ground	H	A	H	H	A	H	A	A	H	A	H	A	H	H	H	A	A	A	H	H	A	H	H	A	H	A	H	A	A	A	H	A	H	A	H	A
Result	W	W	W	W	W	W	D	L	W	D	W	L	W	W	L	D	D	L	W	W	D	W	W	W	W	W	W	W	W	D	W	W	D	W	D	D
Position	3	3	1	1	1	1	1	2	1	2	1	1	1	1	1	2	3	3	2	2	2	2	2	2	2	2	2	1	1	1	1 (Note: Dunfermline were deducted 15 points shortly prior to this fixture altering league standings. This was as a result of them entering administration.)	1	1	1	1	1

Updated to match(es) played on 4 May 2013. Source:
A = Away; H = Home; W = Win; D = Draw; L = Loss

== Transfers ==
=== Players in ===
Player	From	Fee
(Scotland) Hugh Murray	(Scotland) St Mirren	Free
(Scotland) Aaron Muirhead	(Scotland) Annan Athletic	Undisclosed
(Scotland) Steven Lawless	(Scotland) Motherwell	Free
(Scotland) Sean Welsh	(Scotland) Hibernian	Free
(England) James Craigen	(Scotland) Edinburgh University	Free
(Scotland) Steven Craig	(Scotland) Ross County	Loan
(Scotland) Ross Forbes	(Scotland) Motherwell	Free
(Scotland) Paul Slane	(Scotland) Celtic	Loan
(Scotland) Graeme Smith	(Azerbaijan) Gabala	Free
(Scotland) Steven Craig	(Scotland) Ross County	Free
(Belgium) Glenn Daniels	(Scotland) Celtic	Loan
(Scotland) Dominic Green	(Scotland) Motherwell	Loan
(Scotland) Jordan McMillan	(Scotland) Dunfermline Athletic	Free
(Scotland) Andy Dowie	(Scotland) Dunfermline Athletic	Free

=== Players out ===
Player	To	Fee
(Northern Ireland) Thomas Stewart	(Republic of Ireland) Shamrock Rovers	Free
(Scotland) Kieran Burns	(Scotland) Irvine Meadow XI	Free
(Scotland) Gavin Griffin	(Scotland) Airdrie United	Free
(Scotland) William Kinniburgh	(Scotland) Irvine Meadow XI	Free
(Scotland) Mark Burbidge	Free Agent	Free
(Scotland) Chris Ketterer	Free Agent	Free
(Scotland) Jordan McGrotty	Free Agent	Free
(Scotland) Colin Stevenson	(Scotland) Irvine Meadow XI	Free
(Scotland) Paul Cairney	(Scotland) Hibernian	Free
(Scotland) Scott Robertson	(Scotland) Arbroath	Free
(Scotland) Jonathan Lindsay	(England) Stalybridge Celtic	Free
(Scotland) Shaun Fraser	Free Agent	Free
(Northern Ireland) Caolan McAleer	(Scotland) Arthurlie	Loan
(Scotland) Mark McGuigan	(Scotland) Albion Rovers	Loan
(England) James Craigen	(Scotland) Forfar Athletic	Loan
(England) Christie Elliott	(Scotland) Albion Rovers	Loan
(Scotland) Bradley Halsman	(Scotland) Albion Rovers	Loan
(Scotland) David Rowson	(Scotland) Stenhousemuir	Loan
(Scotland) Graeme Smith	(Scotland) Ayr United	Free
(Scotland) Jamie Campbell	(Scotland) Stranraer	Loan
(Scotland) Ryan Scully	(Scotland) Albion Rovers	Loan
(Scotland) Dale Keenan	(Scotland) East Fife	Loan
(Scotland) David Rowson	(Scotland) Stenhousemuir	Free
