= Scott Fox (footballer) =

Scottish footballer (born 1987)

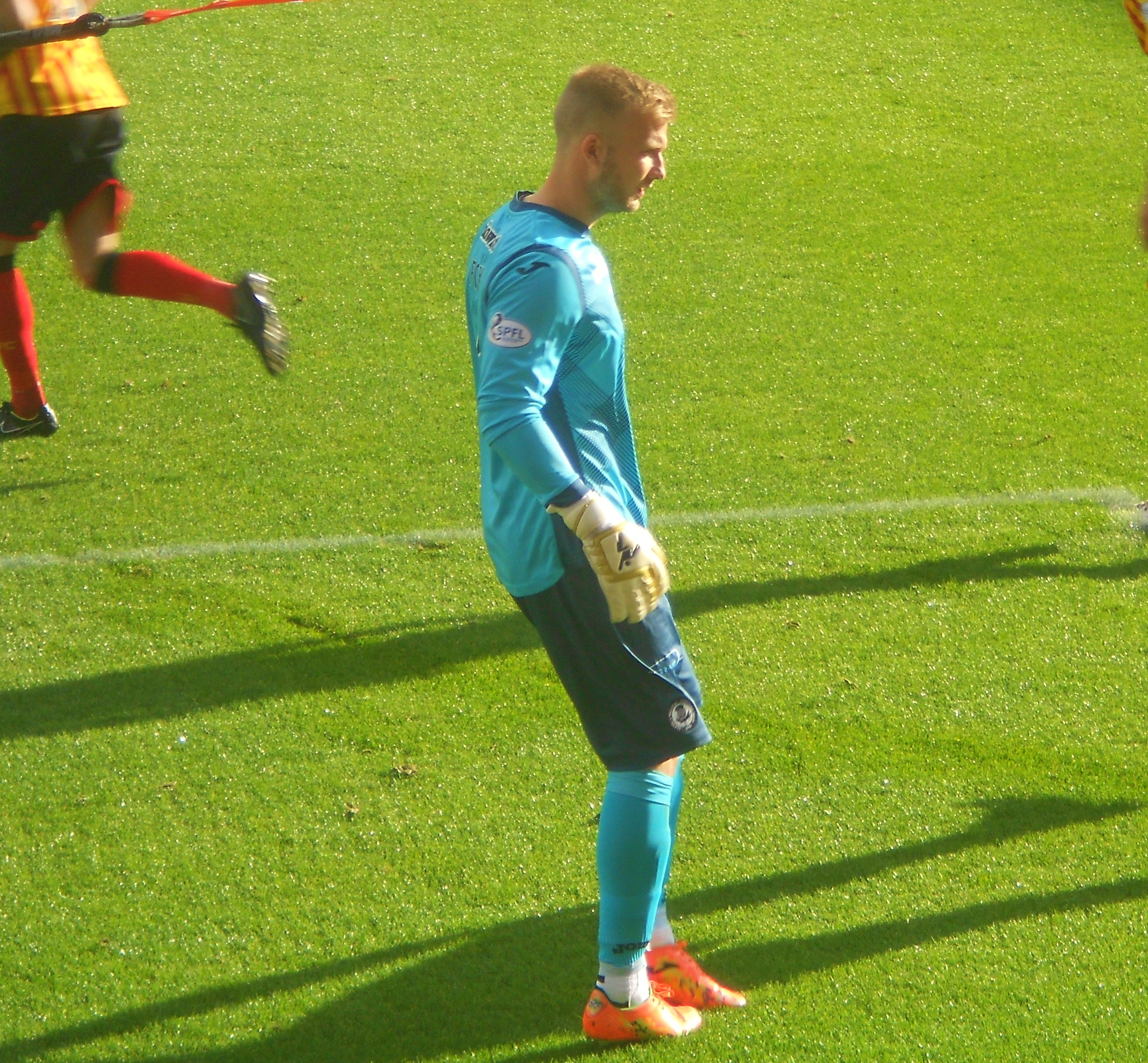

Personal information
- Date of birth: 28 June 1987 (age 39)
- Place of birth: Bellshill, Scotland
- Height: 1.82 m (6 ft 0 in)
- Position: Goalkeeper

Senior career*
Years	Team	Apps	(Gls)
2007–2010	Celtic	0	(0)
2007–2008	→ East Fife (loan)	11	(0)
2010	Queen of the South	6	(0)
2010	Dundee	2	(0)
2010–2015	Partick Thistle	127	(0)
2015–2019	Ross County	125	(0)
2019–2020	Partick Thistle	22	(0)
2020–2022	Motherwell	0	(0)
2020–2021	→ Greenock Morton (loan)	2	(0)
2022	→ Queen of the South (loan)	4	(0)
2023	Cove Rangers	10	(0)

International career
2007	Scotland U20	3	(0)
- * Club domestic league appearances and goals as of 17:00, 8 April 2023 (UTC)

Scott Fox (born 28 June 1987) is a Scottish professional goalkeeper who is a free agent. He has previously played for Celtic, East Fife, Queen of the South, Dundee, Ross County, Partick Thistle, Greenock Morton, Motherwell and Cove Rangers. Fox was selected by Scotland National Football Team manager Gordon Strachan to be part of the national squad to face Norway in 2013.

== Club career ==
=== Celtic ===
Fox began his career at Celtic. However, he never made an appearance for the club. During his time at Celtic, he was part of the side that won the double of under-19 league and the Scottish Youth Cup in 2005 and 2006. On 20 August 2007, he signed for the Third Division club East Fife on loan. While he was at East Fife, he won the Scottish Football League Young Player of the Month Award for November 2007. On 15 January 2008, he agreed to move to Ayr United on loan for the rest of the season. However, Celtic cancelled the loan and the transfer never took place.

With his contract at Celtic having expired in Summer 2009, Fox went on trial at Exeter City and Lincoln City. However, due to Celtic being entitled to a development fee and still holding his registration as he was under 23, there was no contract offer. Fox eventually took his case to FIFA although he ultimately lost and spent six months without playing.

=== Queen of the South ===
On 29 January 2010, Gordon Chisholm signed Fox for Dumfries club Queen of the South from Celtic on amateur forms. On 16 February 2010, Fox debuted for the Doonhamers, in place of the suspended David Hutton, in a 3–0 win versus Ayr United at Palmerston.

On 3 April 2010, Fox replaced Hutton as a substitute in the 36th minute, due to a back injury, in a 3–3 draw versus Morton at Cappielow, under the management of Kenny Brannigan. Altogether, Fox played six league matches for the Doonhamers, although he was not retained at the end of the season.

=== Dundee ===
Fox joined up for the second time with manager Gordon Chisholm at the start of July 2010 when he joined Dundee.

He was released in October when the club entered administration.

=== Partick Thistle ===
Fox was on trial for Partick Thistle during a 4–0 reserve team victory against Ayr United. He made his first team debut as a trialist on 30 October 2010, in a 1–0 victory for Partick Thistle against Cowdenbeath. At the end of the 2010–11 season, Fox received the Player of the Year award from the club.

In April 2013, Fox signed a new contract keeping him at Partick Thistle until 2015. At the end of the 2012–13 season, with Partick Thistle having won the First Division, gaining promotion to the Scottish Premier League, Fox was named in the PFA Scotland 2012–13 First Division Team of the Year.

Following a bad ankle injury in late 2013, Fox was replaced by substitute keeper and ex-Scotland international Paul Gallacher for the remainder of the 2013–14 Scottish Premiership season. Fox made an appearance on the final day of the season in a 3–2 loss to Ross County at Firhill, however, he collided heavily with County's Jordan Slew and was stretchered off with ankle trauma.

On 16 August 2014, Fox was sent off against Dundee in the second game of Thistle's 2014–15 Scottish Premiership campaign following an incident with Paul McGowan. He was replaced by Paul Gallacher, who saved the subsequent Gary Harkins penalty. In November 2014, Fox called off the day before Thistle were due to play Aberdeen due to apparent food poisoning. Gallacher subsequently took his place in goals, however, Thistle went on to lose the match 1–0.

Fox left the club in May 2015, having made 135 appearances in total for Thistle.

=== Ross County ===
On 29 May 2015, Fox made the switch to Scottish Premiership rivals Ross County, signing a two-year deal. During his time at the club, Fox helped County win the Scottish League Cup, though he missed the final due to injury. Fox also won the Scottish Championship and the Scottish Challenge Cup. Fox left County in May 2019 having not agreed a new contract with the club.

=== Return to Partick Thistle ===
Fox signed a two-year contract with Partick Thistle on 1 July 2019. He made his first appearance in his second spell at Thistle in a 2–2 draw with Hamilton Academical on 20 July 2019. He started the league season as backup goalkeeper to Jamie Sneddon, however, he soon became the club's permanent No.1 goalkeeper from the arrival of new manager Ian McCall.

Following Partick Thistle's early relegation to League One as a result of the Coronavirus Pandemic, Fox invoked a relegation release clause on 6 June 2020, ending his second spell at the club.

=== Motherwell ===
On 22 June 2020, Fox signed a one-year deal with Scottish Premiership outfit Motherwell on a free transfer. During pre-season training he suffered an anterior cruciate ligament (ACL) injury that prevented him from playing for most of the 2020–21 season.

Fox was loaned on an emergency basis to Greenock Morton in May 2021 for their play-off with Airdrieonians.

Upon his return to Motherwell, he signed a new one-year contract. On 23 February 2022, Fox signed a new contract with Motherwell, until the summer of 2023.

On 1 September 2022, Fox was loaned out to Scottish League One club Queen of the South for the remainder of the 2022–23 season. This was due to goalkeeper Tom Ritchie's recall by Aberdeen, early from his loan spell in Dumfries. Ritchie has since been sent out on loan to Peterhead. On 24 November, Fox was recalled by Motherwell after his loan was cancelled by mutual consent. On 22 December 2022, Fox left Motherwell by mutual agreement.

=== Cove Rangers ===
On 17 January 2023, Fox joined Scottish Championship club Cove Rangers on an 18-month deal.

== International career ==
Fox was part of the Scotland under-19 squad that made it to the final of the 2006 European Under-19 Championship in Poland. He was also named in the squad that took part in the 2007 Under-20 World Cup. He played in Scotland's final match of the tournament, a 2–1 defeat against Costa Rica that saw them exit the tournament at the group stage.

Fox was selected for the full Scotland squad for the first time in November 2013 for the matches against USA and Norway.

== Career statistics ==
As of 10 April 2023

Appearances and goals by club, season and competition
Club	Season	League			Cup		League Cup		Other		Total	
Club	Season	Division	Apps	Goals	Apps	Goals	Apps	Goals	Apps	Goals	Apps	Goals
Celtic	2007–08	Scottish Premier League	0	0	0	0	0	0	0	0	0	0
Celtic	2008–09	Scottish Premier League	0	0	0	0	0	0	0	0	0	0
Celtic	Total		0	0	0	0	0	0	0	0	0	0
East Fife (loan)	2007–08	Scottish Third Division	11	0	2	0	0	0	0	0	13	0
Queen of the South	2009–10	Scottish First Division	6	0	0	0	0	0	0	0	6	0
Dundee	2010–11	Scottish First Division	2	0	0	0	0	0	2 (Note: Appearances in the Scottish Challenge Cup)	0	4	0
Partick Thistle	2010–11	Scottish First Division	24	0	4	0	0	0	0	0	28	0
Partick Thistle	2011–12	Scottish First Division	31	0	3	0	1	0	2	0	37	0
Partick Thistle	2012–13	Scottish First Division	29	0	1	0	2	0	4	0	36	0
Partick Thistle	2013–14	Scottish Premiership	21	0	1	0	3	0	0	0	25	0
Partick Thistle	2014–15	Scottish Premiership	22	0	0	0	2	0	0	0	24	0
Partick Thistle	Total		127	0	9	0	8	0	6	0	150	0
Ross County	2015–16	Scottish Premiership	27	0	2	0	2	0	0	0	31	0
Ross County	2016–17	Scottish Premiership	35	0	2	0	3	0	0	0	40	0
Ross County	2017–18	Scottish Premiership	27	0	0	0	4	0	0	0	31	0
Ross County	2018–19	Scottish Championship	36	0	3	0	5	0	1	0	45	0
Ross County	Total		125	0	7	0	14	0	1	0	147	0
Partick Thistle	2019–20	Scottish Championship	22	0	2	0	4	0	4	0	32	0
Motherwell	2020–21	Scottish Premiership	0	0	0	0	0	0	0	0	0	0
Motherwell	2021–22	Scottish Premiership	0	0	0	0	0	0	0	0	0	0
Motherwell	Total		0	0	0	0	0	0	0	0	0	0
Greenock Morton (loan)	2020–21	Scottish Championship	0	0	0	0	0	0	2 (Note: Appearances in the Scottish Championship play-offs)	0	2	0
Queen of the South (loan)	2022–23	Scottish League One	4	0	0	0	0	0	0	0	4	0
Cove Rangers	2022–23	Scottish Championship	10	0	0	0	0	0	0	0	10	0
Career total			307	0	20	0	26	0	13	0	368	0

== Honours ==
=== Club ===
Celtic

- SPL Under-19 League: 2004–05, 2005–06
- Scottish Youth Cup: 2004–05, 2005–06

Partick Thistle

- Scottish First Division: 2012–13

Ross County

- Scottish League Cup: 2015–16
- Scottish Championship: 2018–19
- Scottish Challenge Cup: 2018–19

=== Individual ===
- Scottish Football League Young Player of the Month: November 2007
- Scottish Football League Player of the Month: January 2011
- PFA Scotland First Division Team of the Year: 2012–13, 2018–19
