= Stephen O'Donnell (footballer, born 1992) =

Scottish association football player

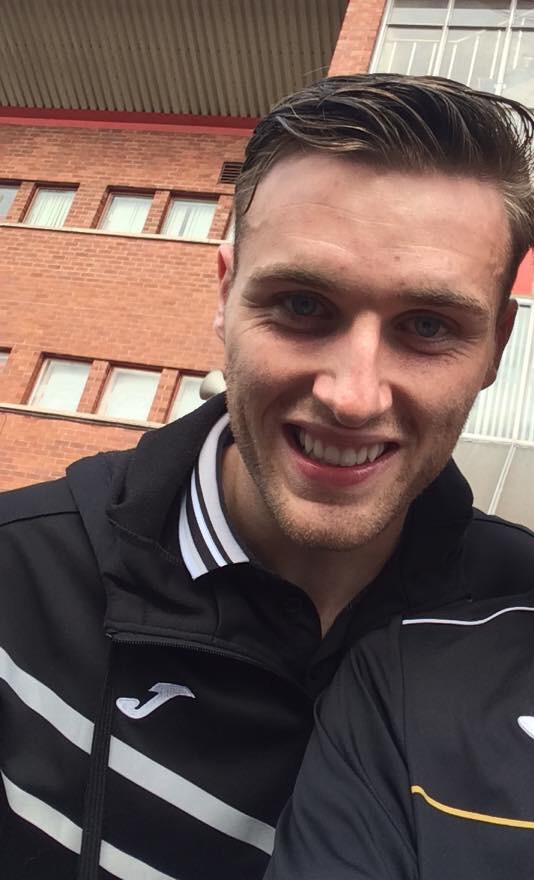
- O'Donnell in 2015

Personal information
- Full name: Stephen Gerard O'Donnell
- Date of birth: 11 May 1992 (age 34)
- Place of birth: Bellshill, Scotland
- Height: 6 ft 0 in (1.83 m)
- Position: Right-back

Team information
- Current team: Motherwell
- Number: 2

Youth career
- 1998–2002: Wishaw Wycombe Wanderers
- 2002–2009: Aberdeen
- 2009–2011: Celtic

Senior career*
Years	Team	Apps	(Gls)
2011–2015	Partick Thistle	121	(9)
2015–2017	Luton Town	60	(1)
2017–2020	Kilmarnock	101	(5)
2020–	Motherwell	190	(2)

International career^{‡}
2013	Scotland U21	1	(0)
2018–2022	Scotland	26	(0)
- * Club domestic league appearances and goals as of 20 May 2026 ‡ National team caps and goals as of 16:09, 10 March 2023 (UTC)

Stephen Gerard O'Donnell (born 11 May 1992) is a Scottish professional footballer who plays as a right-back for Scottish Premiership club Motherwell and the Scotland national team. He has previously played for Partick Thistle, Luton Town and Kilmarnock, and was capped once by the Scotland under-21 team in 2013 before being selected 26 times at full level from 2018, including at the UEFA Euro 2020 tournament.

== Club career ==
=== Early career ===
A pupil at St Aidan's High School in Wishaw, O'Donnell began his career as a youth player with Wishaw Wycombe Wanderers and captained the Aberdeen under-17 team. He then joined Celtic, where he was part of the team that won the Scottish Youth Cup and under-19 league title in 2010–11.

=== Partick Thistle ===
O'Donnell was released by Celtic in 2011 and on 23 August 2011 signed for Partick Thistle on a one-year contract after impressing on trial. He went on to make his debut on 17 September as a substitute in a 4–0 win at home to Ayr United. In 2012–13, O'Donnell played in 38 matches as Partick Thistle won promotion to the Scottish Premiership and reached the final of the Scottish Challenge Cup. He was named in the PFA Scotland First Division Team of the Year as a result of his performances.

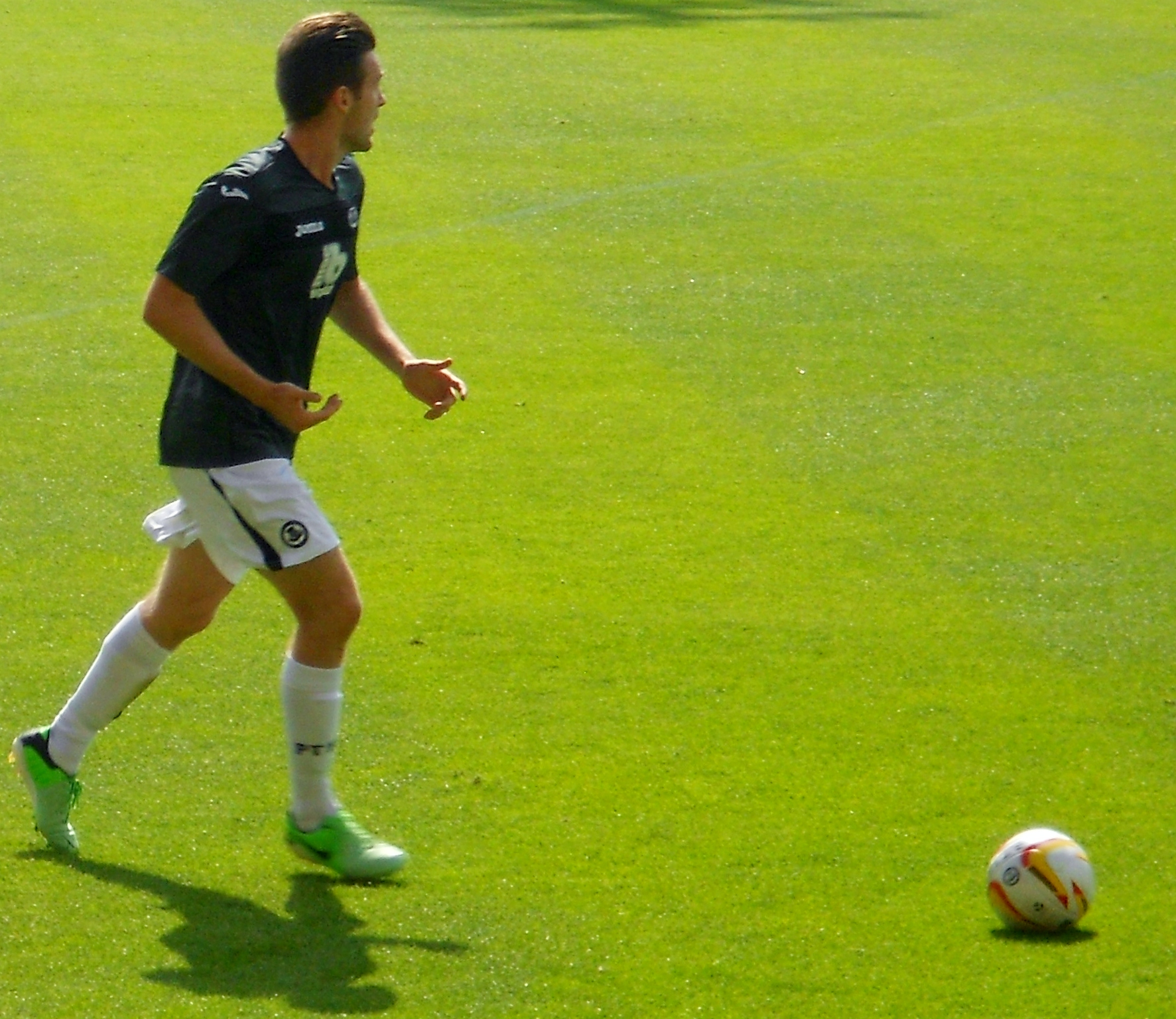
O'Donnell playing for Partick Thistle against AEL Limassol during a friendly in 2013.

On 27 January 2015, Championship club Blackpool upped an initial offer of £50,000 for O'Donnell to £125,000. This offer was accepted by Partick Thistle; however, O'Donnell rejected the personal terms on offer at Blackpool in favour of seeing out the remaining six months of his contract. He left Partick Thistle upon the expiry of his contract at the end of the 2014–15 season, having made 139 appearances for the club.

=== Luton Town ===
On 22 June 2015, O'Donnell signed a two-year contract with League Two club Luton Town. He made his Luton debut in a 3–1 win at home to newly promoted Championship club Bristol City in the League Cup on 11 August. O'Donnell's first goal for the club was a 90th-minute winner in a 2–1 win at home to Leyton Orient in the Football League Trophy on 1 September. He finished the 2015–16 season with 33 appearances and one goal. O'Donnell netted his second Luton goal in 2016–17 from a 25-yard shot in a 1–1 draw at home to Yeovil Town on 13 August 2016.

However, a loss of form saw O'Donnell lose his place in the team to academy graduate James Justin after a 2–0 defeat away to Crawley Town on 17 September. He regained his place in the team to make his first league start in five matches after Justin suffered a calf injury in the warm up before Luton's 2–1 win away to Leyton Orient on 15 October. O'Donnell lost his place once more when Justin returned from injury for Luton's 3–1 win away to Exeter City in the FA Cup on 5 November, but a half-time substitute appearance in the next round at home to National League club Solihull Moors on 3 December saw him score twice as Luton overturned a 2–0 deficit to win 6–2. He was then recalled to the starting lineup by manager Nathan Jones for the subsequent league match at home to Carlisle United, which resulted in a 1–1 draw. O'Donnell was released when his contract expired at the end of 2016–17.

=== Kilmarnock ===
O'Donnell signed a three-year contract with Scottish Premiership club Kilmarnock on 4 July 2017. O'Donnell performed well following the appointment of Steve Clarke as Kilmarnock manager, and he was selected for the Scotland squad in May 2018. Kilmarnock offered O'Donnell a new three-year contract in August 2019, but he opted to evaluate his contract situation at the end of the season. During January 2020 Oxford United made an offer for O'Donnell, but a deal was not completed before the closure of the transfer window. He rejected a new contract with Kilmarnock at the end of the 2019–20 season.

=== Motherwell ===
On 13 August 2020, Motherwell announced the signing of O'Donnell on a contract until the next transfer window. On 1 February 2021, he agreed a new contract with Motherwell until the end of the season. On 13 April 2021, O'Donnell signed a new two-year contract with Motherwell, keeping him at the club until the summer of 2023.

On 3 June 2024, Motherwell announced that O'Donnell had signed a new two-year contract with the club. On 18 March 2025, Motherwell announced that they had triggered their one-year contract extension with O'Donnell.

== International career ==
O'Donnell made one appearance for the Scotland under-21 team in February 2013. He received his first call-up to the Scotland national team in May 2018, for friendly matches against Peru and Mexico. O'Donnell made his full Scotland debut on 29 May 2018, in a 2–0 defeat to Peru. He retained his place in the squad for the matches in September 2018, and "excelled" in the 2–0 win against Albania on 10 September.

O'Donnell was selected in the Scotland squad for UEFA Euro 2020 and played in all three of their matches at the tournament. His performance in the opening game against the Czech Republic was criticised, but was then praised after the goalless draw against England in the second match. In September 2021 he gained his 23rd cap overall and 12th as a Motherwell player in a 1–0 away win over Austria during 2022 FIFA World Cup qualification; as well as being praised for aspects of his performance against the highly regarded David Alaba, he also equalled a long-standing Motherwell club caps record set by George Stevenson in the 1930s.

== Career statistics ==
=== Club ===
As of match played 20 August 2026

Appearances and goals by club, season and competition
Club	Season	League			National Cup		League Cup		Other		Total	
Club	Season	Division	Apps	Goals	Apps	Goals	Apps	Goals	Apps	Goals	Apps	Goals
Partick Thistle	2011–12	Scottish First Division	31	2	2	0	0	0	0	0	33	2
Partick Thistle	2012–13	Scottish First Division	29	2	2	0	2	0	5 (Note: Appearances in Scottish Challenge Cup)	0	38	2
Partick Thistle	2013–14	Scottish Premiership	27	0	0	0	3	1	0	0	30	1
Partick Thistle	2014–15	Scottish Premiership	34	5	2	0	2	0	0	0	38	5
Partick Thistle	Total		121	9	6	0	7	1	5	0	139	10
Luton Town	2015–16	EFL League Two	30	0	0	0	2	0	1 (Note: Appearance in Football League Trophy)	1	33	1
Luton Town	2016–17	EFL League Two	30	1	3	2	2	0	4 (Note: Appearances in EFL Trophy)	0	39	3
Luton Town	Total		60	1	3	2	4	0	5	1	72	4
Kilmarnock	2017–18	Scottish Premiership	36	2	4	2	4	0	—		44	4
Kilmarnock	2018–19	Scottish Premiership	37	0	2	0	4	0	—		43	0
Kilmarnock	2019–20	Scottish Premiership	28	3	3	0	2	0	2 (Note: Appearances in UEFA Europa League)	0	35	3
Kilmarnock	Total		101	5	9	2	10	0	2	0	122	7
Motherwell	2020–21	Scottish Premiership	34	1	3	1	1	0	3	1	41	3
Motherwell	2021–22	Scottish Premiership	28	0	2	0	4	0	—		34	0
Motherwell	2022–23	Scottish Premiership	27	0	1	0	0	0	0	0	28	0
Motherwell	2023–24	Scottish Premiership	37	0	2	0	5	0	0	0	44	0
Motherwell	2024–25	Scottish Premiership	29	1	1	0	6	1	0	0	36	2
Motherwell	2025–26	Scottish Premiership	35	0	2	0	6	1	0	0	43	1
Motherwell	2026–27	Scottish Premiership	0	0	0	0	0	0	1 (Note: Appearances in UEFA Conference League)	0	1	0
Motherwell	Total		190	2	11	1	18	1	4	1	227	6
Career total			444	17	29	5	41	3	16	2	560	27

=== International ===
As of match played 29 March 2022

Appearances and goals by national team and year
National team	Year	Apps	Goals
Scotland	2018	6	0
Scotland	2019	5	0
Scotland	2020	5	0
Scotland	2021	8	0
Scotland	2022	2	0
Total		26	0

== Honours ==
Partick Thistle

- Scottish First Division: 2012–13
- Scottish Challenge Cup runner-up: 2012–13

Individual

- PFA Scotland Team of the Year: 2012–13 Scottish First Division
