= Conrad Balatoni =

English footballer (born 1991)

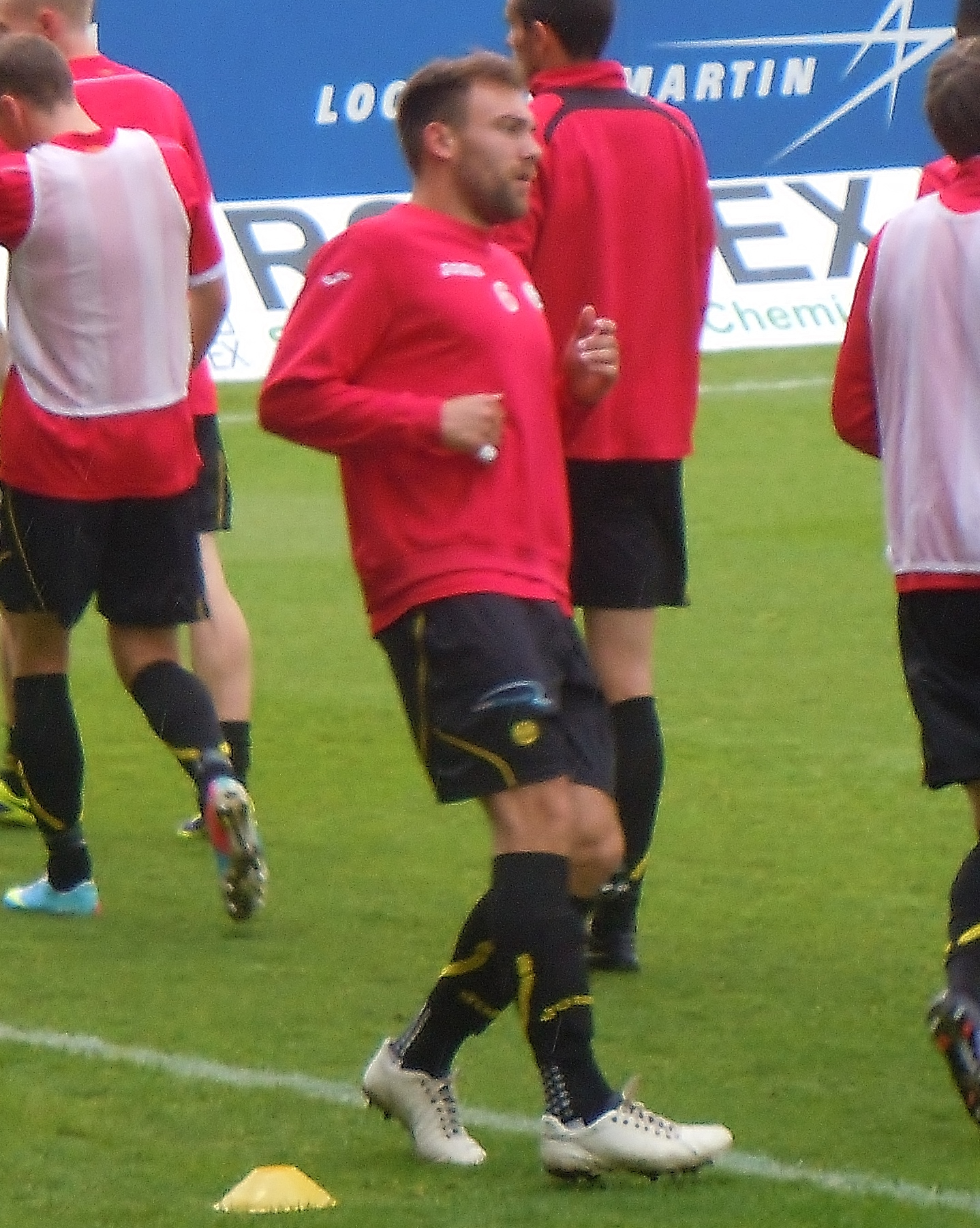
- Conrad warming up for Partick Thistle

Personal information
- Date of birth: 27 January 1991 (age 35)
- Place of birth: Leeds, England
- Position: Defender

Team information
- Current team: Civil Service Strollers

Youth career
- 2007–2010: Heart of Midlothian

Senior career*
Years	Team	Apps	(Gls)
2010–2012	Heart of Midlothian	0	(0)
2010–2011	→ Partick Thistle (loan)	22	(1)
2011–2012	→ Partick Thistle (loan)	16	(1)
2012–2015	Partick Thistle	100	(10)
2015–2016	Kilmarnock	35	(3)
2016–2017	Ayr United	30	(1)
2017	Falkirk	8	(0)
2018	Torquay United	16	(0)
2018–2021	Edinburgh City	74	(6)
2021–2022	Clyde	10	(0)
2022	→ Berwick Rangers (loan)	0	(0)
2022–	Civil Service Strollers	0	(0)
- * Club domestic league appearances and goals as of 23:19, 24 February 2022

Conrad Balatoni (born 27 January 1991) is an English professional footballer who plays as a defender for the Civil Service Strollers. He started his career in the youth teams of Heart of Midlothian. Having failed to break into the Hearts first team, Balatoni joined Partick Thistle in 2012 after spending two loan spells there.

After a five-year stint with the Maryhill side, Balatoni joined Kilmarnock in 2015, then moved to Ayr United a year later. Short-term deals with Falkirk in the SPFL Championship and then Torquay United in the National League followed before Balatoni returned to Scottish football with Edinburgh City. Balatoni joined Scottish League One side Clyde in June 2021. Then moved to Berwick Rangers on loan and onto Civil Service Strollers.

== Career ==
=== Hearts ===
Born in Leeds, Balatoni moved to Edinburgh where he attended James Gillespies High School. Balatoni grew up supporting Hearts before becoming a member of the youth team. Balatoni was promoted to the first team squad on 12 November 2008, being named as a substitute against Hamilton but he didn't make an appearance. He was named on the bench on four other occasions. In August 2010, Balatoni was sent on loan to Partick Thistle to gain first team experience. On his return he was included in the first team squad to travel to Hearts pre-season camp in Tuscany. In July 2011, he was sent on loan to Partick Thistle for a second spell. During his second term at Partick Thistle, with Hearts in financial difficulty, he was informed that he was free to find a new club. Despite this he returned to Hearts at the end of his loan spell.

On 31 January 2012, he became a free agent having negotiated an early release from his contract. He made no first team appearances for the club.

=== Partick Thistle ===
Having yet to make a first team appearance for Hearts, Balatoni joined Scottish First Division side Partick Thistle on a season-long loan in August 2010, having impressed in a friendly against Celtic. He made his debut against Raith Rovers on 7 August, as a substitute, He scored his first goal for Thistle against Stirling Albion on 22 March 2011. His appearances were limited due to a hamstring injury that forced him to return to Hearts for treatment. Over the course of the season he made 25 appearances in all competitions, scoring 1 goal.

In July 2011, Balatoni rejoined Partick Thistle for a second loan spell until 1 January 2012. He made his second debut on 23 July against Stenhousemuir in the Challenge Cup. His league debut coming on 6 August 2011, as a 56th-minute substitute against Dundee. With his Hearts future in doubt, Partick Thistle boss Jackie McNamara expressed his hope that he would be able to keep Balatoni. However, he returned to Hearts at the end of his loan spell.

After being released by Hearts in January 2012, on 16 February 2012, Balatoni signed for Partick Thistle until the end of the season. At the end of the 2011–12 season, he signed a two-year contract with the club. In the 2012–13 season, Balatoni quickly became a fans favourite at Firhill scoring goals coming from the back and being solid in the defence. In January 2013, he scored a double, in a 4–1 win against Falkirk, then scored again in the next game, in a 2–1 win over Cowdenbeath. In the final of the Scottish Challenge Cup against Queen of the South, Balantoni missed the seventh penalty in a penalty-shootout following a 1–1 draw after extra-time, allowing Queen of the South to win the penalty shootout. Despite the loss, the club recovered and earned promotion to the Scottish Premier League for the first time in over nine years. Balatoni had a clean sweep of all the club's player of the year awards. Supporters have reworked 1984 Black Lace hit, "Do The Conga", in his honour to now feature the refrain: "Do do do, Conrad Balatoni". Ahead of the new season, Balatoni signed a new two-year contract.

In the 2013–14 season, Balatoni was in central defence alongside Aaron Muirhead, the pair making their Scottish Premiership debut, in the opening game of the season, against Dundee United and after the match, Manager Alan Archibald commented on the partnership as "outstanding". Towards the end of the 2014–15 season, with his contract expiring, Balatoni suggested that he may not stay sign a new contract. At the end of the season, Alan Archibald said it was unlikely that Balatoni would be staying with the club.

After leaving Partick Thistle, Balatoni played for Bradford City during pre-season and had an offer from Dunfermline Athletic.

=== Kilmarnock ===
On 12 September 2015, Balatoni signed for Kilmarnock, agreeing a short-term contract until January 2016. He signed a contract extension on 23 November 2015, keeping him at the club until summer 2018. In April 2016, Balatoni was criticised by Kilmarnock manager Lee Clark following a match away to Inverness Caledonian Thistle when, with Kilmarnock 1–0 ahead at the time, his backpass was intercepted leading to a red card for goalkeeper Jamie Macdonald and Kilmarnock went on to lose the match 3–1.

At the end of the 2015–16 season, Kilmarnock announced that Balatoni was one of a number of players they would listen to offers for. On 30 August 2016, he left Kilmarnock, with his contract being cancelled by mutual consent.

=== Ayr United ===
On 2 September 2016, Balatoni signed for Ayr United on a contract until the end of the season. Balatoni's contract was not renewed, and in May 2017 he was released after the club's relegation from the Scottish Championship.

=== Falkirk ===
During August 2017, Balatoni played as a trialist for Scottish League One side Airdrieonians. He then signed a short-term contract with Falkirk. He made his debut in a 2–1 win against Sligo Rovers in the Challenge Cup on 2 September 2017. Balatoni scored his first goal for the club on 7 October 2017 in a 2–0 victory over Dunfermline in the Challenge Cup. He left the club at the end of December 2017 after his contract ended and due to fitness issues.

=== Torquay United ===
On 10 January 2018, Balotoni signed for National League strugglers Torquay United.

He was released by Torquay at the end of the 2017–18 season.

=== Edinburgh City ===
On 16 June 2018, Balatoni signed for Scottish League Two side Edinburgh City on a two-year deal.

=== Clyde ===
On 15 June 2021, Balatoni signed a one-year contract with Scottish League One side Clyde. On 24 February 2022, Balatoni joined Lowland League side Berwick Rangers on loan until the end of the season, and signed a pre-contract agreement with them for the following season.

== Career statistics ==
As of match played 16 October 2021

Appearances and goals by club, season and competition
Club	Season	League			Cup		League Cup		Other		Total	
Club	Season	Division	Apps	Goals	Apps	Goals	Apps	Goals	Apps	Goals	Apps	Goals
Heart of Midlothian	2010–11	Scottish Premier League	0	0	0	0	0	0	0	0	0	0
Heart of Midlothian	2011–12	Scottish Premier League	0	0	0	0	0	0	0	0	0	0
Heart of Midlothian	Total		0	0	0	0	0	0	0	0	0	0
Partick Thistle (loan)	2010–11	Scottish First Division	22	1	0	0	1	0	2 (Note: Appearances in the Scottish Challenge Cup)	0	25	1
Partick Thistle (loan)	2011–12	Scottish First Division	16	1	1	0	1	0	2	0	20	1
Partick Thistle	2011–12	Scottish First Division	8	0	0	0	0	0	0	0	8	0
Partick Thistle	2012–13	Scottish First Division	29	6	2	0	0	0	4	0	35	6
Partick Thistle	2013–14	Scottish Premiership	31	1	1	0	2	1	0	0	34	2
Partick Thistle	2014–15	Scottish Premiership	32	3	0	0	3	0	0	0	35	3
Partick Thistle	Total		100	10	3	0	5	1	4	0	112	11
Kilmarnock	2015–16	Scottish Premiership	30	3	3	0	1	0	0	0	34	3
Ayr United	2016–17	Scottish Championship	30	1	6	1	0	0	3	1	39	3
Falkirk	2017–18	Scottish Championship	8	0	0	0	0	0	3	1	11	1
Torquay United	2017–18	National League	16	0	0	0	0	0	0	0	16	0
Edinburgh City	2018–19	Scottish League Two	35	4	3	0	4	1	7 (Note: Five appearances in the Scottish Challenge Cup and two in the Scottish League One play-offs)	0	49	5
Edinburgh City	2019–20	Scottish League Two	26	1	3	0	4	0	1	0	34	1
Edinburgh City	2020–21	Scottish League Two	13	1	1	0	4	0	2 (Note: Appearances in the Scottish League One play-offs)	0	20	1
Edinburgh City	Total		74	6	7	0	12	1	10	0	103	7
Clyde	2021–22	Scottish League One	10	0	0	0	4	0	1	0	15	0
Career total			306	22	20	1	24	2	25	2	375	27

== Honours ==
Partick Thistle

- Scottish First Division: 1

2012–13
