= Andrew McCarthy (disambiguation) =

Andrew McCarthy (born 1962) is an American actor.

Andrew McCarthy may also refer to:

- Andrew C. McCarthy (born 1959), American attorney and author
- Andrew McCarthy (footballer), Scottish athlete
