= Ross Stewart =

Ross Stewart may refer to:

- Ross Stewart (footballer, born 1995) (Ross M. Stewart), Scottish football goalkeeper for Queen of the South F.C.
- Ross Stewart (footballer, born 1996) (Ross C. Stewart), Scottish football forward for Swansea City A.F.C.
