= 2020–21 Livingston F.C. season =

Livingston
2020–21 season
- Chairman: Robert Wilson
- Manager: Gary Holt (until 26 Nov 20); David Martindale (from 21 Dec 20)
- Stadium: Almondvale Stadium
- Scottish Premiership: 6th
- Scottish Cup: Fourth round
- Scottish League Cup: Runners–up
- Top goalscorer: League: Scott Pittman (7); All: Alan Forrest (11)
Home colours	Away colours

The 2020–21 season was the club's third consecutive season in the Scottish Premiership, the top flight of Scottish football. Livingston also competed in the Scottish Cup and the League Cup.

== Season summary ==
Goalkeeper Gary Maley signed a new contract after a Twitter poll "joke" vote from fans. Marvin Bartley was named as new captain for the season. On 19 August, Lyndon Dykes left the club to join Queens Park Rangers for £2,000,000, breaking the record for the fee of a player sold by the club but part of the fee will go to Queen of the South as a sell-on clause. Having signed on 22 August, Anthony Stokes left the club on 15 September without making an appearance for the club. After the defeat to Celtic, Livi were bottom of the table but back to back wins seen them move up to the top six before the October International break. On 26 November, Gary Holt resigned as manager after failing to win in five matches. David Martindale and Tony Caig took over as caretakers with Martindale insisting he was "a changed man". Martindale’s appointment saw the club’s form improve dramatically, with the club getting 8 consecutive wins and going 10 consecutive games unbeaten after a 2-2 draw with Celtic. Livi reached the League Cup final for the first time since 2004 after beating St Mirren at Hampden Park. The SFA's 'Fit and proper person' hearing was a positive outcome for manager Martindale, who was turned down in his application to be a club official a year earlier but had since been supported publicly. The winning run continued as Livi won at Pittodrie for the first time since 2004, making it 14 matches unbeaten. Livi progressed into the Top Six cut-off but finished Sixth, failing to win any of their post-split matches, dropping one place from last season. But still, a top-half finish and their second-highest points total in the Premiership is not to be scoffed at. Martindale has exceeded expectations this season and then some.

== Results & fixtures ==
Win Draw Loss Postponed

=== Pre-season ===
18 July 2020 Friendly	Dundee United	0–0	Livingston	Tannadice Park
		Report		Attendance: 0

22 July 2020 Friendly	Kilmarnock	1–2	Livingston	Rugby Park
	McKenzie 25'	Report	Forrest 24'; Ambrose 60'	Attendance: 0

25 July 2020 Friendly	Livingston	2–2	Ross County	Almondvale Stadium
14:00	Dykes 32'; Kouider-Aïssa 49'	Report	Stewart 55'; Fontaine 75'	Attendance: 0

=== Scottish Premiership ===
1 August 2020 1	St Mirren	1–0	Livingston	St Mirren Park
15:00 BST	Tait 30'	Report		Attendance: 50; Referee: Don Robertson

8 August 2020 2	Livingston	1–4	Hibernian	Almondvale Stadium
15:00 BST	Dykes 60' (pen.)	Report	Nisbet 24', 37', 88' (pen.); Doidge 41'	Referee: Euan Anderson

12 August 2020 3	Motherwell	2–2	Livingston	Fir Park
19:45 BST	Turnbull 8'; Campbell 35'	Report	Dykes 10' (pen.); Forrest 69'	Referee: Colin Steven

16 August 2020 4	Livingston	0–0	Rangers	Almondvale Stadium
16:30 BST		Report		Referee: Nick Walsh

23 August 2020 5	Aberdeen	2–1	Livingston	Pittodrie Stadium
15:00 BST	Ferguson 49'; Wright 55'	Report	Sibbald (yellow card) 42'; Devlin (yellow card) 43'; Pittman 69'

29 August 2020 6	Livingston	1–0	Ross County	Almondvale Stadium
15:00 BST	Guthrie 64'; Serrano (yellow card) 67'	Report	Draper (yellow card) 18'; Tremarco (red card) 51'; Gardyne (yellow card) 65'; Donaldson (yellow card) 90+3'	Referee: John Beaton

12 September 2020 7	Livingston	1–2	Hamilton Academical	Almondvale Stadium
15:00 BST	Pittman 1'	Report	Templeton 57'; Munro 85'	Referee: Don Robertson

19 September 2020 8	Celtic	3–2	Livingston	Celtic Park
15:00 BST	McGregor 20'; Christie 23'; Ajeti 52'	Report	Holt 16' (pen.); Serrano 78'	Referee: Gavin Duncan

26 September 2020 9	Livingston	2–0	St Johnstone	Almondvale Stadium
15:00 BST	Tiffoney 34'; Forrest 35'	Report		Referee: Craig Napier

2 October 2020 10	Dundee United	1–2	Livingston	Tannadice Park
19:45 BST	Clark 18'	Report	Guthrie 53'; Forrest 90'	Referee: John Beaton

17 October 2020 11	Livingston	1–3	Kilmarnock	Almondvale Stadium
15:00 BST	Pittman 11'	Report	Tshibola 24'; Burke 37' (pen.); Kiltie 57'	Referee: Greg Aitken

25 October 2020 12	Rangers	2–0	Livingston	Ibrox Stadium
15:00 BST	Aribo 9'; Defoe 16'; Jack (yellow card) 89'	Report	Guthrie (yellow card) 68'	Referee: Nick Walsh

31 October 2020 13	Livingston	0–2	Motherwell	Almondvale Stadium
15:00 GMT	Guthrie (yellow card) 45+1'; Bartley (yellow card) 66'	Report	Lang 22'; Watt 45+2', (yellow card) 73'; Maguire (yellow card) 70'	Referee: John Beaton

6 November 2020 14	Ross County	1–1	Livingston	Global Energy Stadium
19:45 GMT	Shaw 28'; Kelly (yellow card) 90'	Report	Devlin 56'; Bartley (yellow card) 70'	Attendance: 300; Referee: Kevin Clancy

21 November 2020 15	Livingston	0–1	St Mirren	Almondvale Stadium
15:00 GMT		Report	Doyle-Hayes 56'	Referee: Willie Collum

5 December 2020 16	Livingston	2–0	Dundee United	Almondvale Stadium
15:00 GMT	Pittman 57'; Bartley 73'	Report		Referee: Don Robertson

12 December 2020 17	St Johnstone	1–2	Livingston	McDiarmid Park
15:00 GMT	Kane 54'	Report	Guthrie 48'; Robinson 65'	Attendance: 0 Referee: John Beaton

23 December 2020 19	Hamilton Academical	0–2	Livingston	New Douglas Park
18:00 GMT		Report	Guthrie 51'; Mullin 90+1'	Attendance: 0 Referee: Gavin Duncan

26 December 2020 20	Kilmarnock	1–2	Livingston	Rugby Park
15:00 GMT	Burke 48 pen.'	Report	Emmanuel-Thomas 51'; Robinson 90+2'	Attendance: 0 Referee: Kevin Clancy

2 January 2021 22	Hibernian	0–3	Livingston	Easter Road
15:00 GMT		Report	Mullin 9'; Guthrie 16'; Robinson 47'	Attendance: 0 Referee: David Munro

9 January 2021 23	Livingston	3–1	Ross County	Almondvale Stadium
15:00 GMT	Robinson 9'; Forrest 81'; Hamilton 90+1'	Report	Lakin 28'	Attendance: 0 Referee: Alan Muir

16 January 2021 24	Celtic	0–0	Livingston	Celtic Park
15:00 GMT		Report		Attendance: 0 Referee: John Beaton

20 January 2021 18 (Note: Rearranged match after postponement)	Livingston	2–2	Celtic	Almondvale Stadium
20:15 GMT	Brown 15'; Emmanuel-Thomas 60'	Report	Elyounoussi 28'; Bitton 28'; Brown (red card) 83'	Attendance: 0 Referee: Willie Collum
Note: Game televised on Sky Sports.

27 January 2021 25	Livingston	2–0	Kilmarnock	Almondvale Stadium
19:45 GMT	Kabia 89'; Pittman 90'	Report		Attendance: 0 Referee: Steve Kirkland

30 January 2021 21	Livingston	0–0	Aberdeen	Almondvale Stadium
15:00 GMT	Holt (yellow card) 85'	Report		Attendance: 0 Referee: Steven McLean

2 February 2021 26	Aberdeen	0–2	Livingston	Pittodrie Stadium
18:00GMT	Ferguson (yellow card) 32'; Hoban (yellow card) 77'	Report	Lewis 7' (o.g.); Devlin 16'; Longridge (yellow card) 44'	Referee: Nick Walsh

6 February 2021 27	Livingston	1–2	St Johnstone	Almondvale Stadium
15:00 GMT	Pittman 83'	Report	Tanser 45+2'; Rooney 51'	Attendance: 0 Referee: Euan Anderson

13 February 2021 28	Dundee United	3–0	Livingston	Tannadice Park, Dundee
15:00	Sporle 1'; Pawlett (red card) 31'; Shankland 35', 83'	Report	Fitzwater (red card) 61'	Attendance: 0 Referee: Nick Walsh

20 February 2021 29	St Mirren	1–1	Livingston	St Mirren Park, Paisley
15:00	MacPherson 32'	Report	McCarthy 8 o.g.'	Attendance: 0 Referee: Willie Collum

3 March 2021 30	Livingston	0–1	Rangers	Almondvale Stadium
18:00 GMT		Report	Morelos 87'	Attendance: 0 Referee: John Beaton

6 March 2021 31	Motherwell	3–1	Livingston	Fir Park, Motherwell
15:00	Cole 31 pen.', 59'; Long 69'	Report	Fitzwater 60'	Attendance: 0 Referee: Colin Steven

13 March 2021 32	Livingston	2–1	Hamilton Academical	Almondvale Stadium
15:00 GMT	Emmanuel-Thomas 16'; Pittman 36'	Report	Smith 30'	Attendance: 0 Referee: Kevin Clancy

20 March 2021 33	Livingston	1–1	Hibernian	Almondvale Stadium
15:00 GMT	Sibbald 28'	Report	Doidge 41'	Attendance: 0 Referee: Nick Walsh

10 April 2021 34	Celtic	6–0	Livingston	Celtic Park
15:00	Forrest 30'; Turnbull 38'; Fitzwater 50 o.g.' Elyounoussi 54', 66'; Christie 87'	Report		Attendance: 0 Referee: Nick Walsh

21 April 2021 35	Hibernian	2–1	Livingston	Easter Road
15:00	Nisbet 8'; Boyle 26 pen.'	Report	Emmanuel-Thomas 85 pen.'	Attendance: 0 Referee: Craig Napier

1 May 2021 36	Livingston	1–2	Aberdeen	Almondvale Stadium
15:00 GMT	Emmanuel-Thomas 80'	Report	Hendry 52'; Hedges 74'	Attendance: 0 Referee: Grant Irvine

12 May 2021 37	Livingston	0–3	Rangers	Almondvale Stadium
18:00 GMT		Report	Tavernier 42 pen.' Kent 57'; Hagi 83'	Attendance: 0 Referee: Don Robertson

15 May 2021 38	St Johnstone	0–0	Livingston	McDiarmid Park
12:30		Report		Attendance: 0 Referee: Craig Napier

=== Scottish League Cup ===
==== Group stage ====
6 October 2020 Group H	Edinburgh City	1–5	Livingston	Ainslie Park
19:45	Handling 70' (pen.)	Report	Robinson 7'; Mullin 22', 40'; Poplatnik 65'; Lokotsch 77'	Attendance: 0 Referee: Willie Collum

10 October 2020 Group H	Livingston	2–1	Alloa Athletic	Almondvale Stadium
15:00	Forrest 46'; Mullin 50'	Report	Thomson 31'	Attendance: 0 Referee: Alan Muir

10 November 2020 Group H	Stenhousemuir	0–4	Livingston	Ochilview Park
19:30		Report	Forrest 1', 8'; Poplatnik 30'; Taylor-Sinclair 65'	Attendance: 0 Referee: Colin Steven

14 November 2020 Group H	Livingston	4–1	Airdrieonians	Almondvale Stadium
15:00	Forrest 57', 83'; Emmanuel-Thomas 58' (pen.), 67'	Report	Robert 52'	Attendance: 0 Referee: David Munro

==== Knockout rounds ====
28 November 2020 Second round	Livingston	4–0	Ayr United	Almondvale Stadium
15:00	Chalmers 4' (o.g.); Fitzwater 6', 12'; Forrest 44'	Report		Attendance: 0 Referee: David Munro

15 December 2020 Quarter-final	Livingston	2–0	Ross County	Almondvale Stadium
19:45	Sibbald 4'; Forrest 24'	Report		Attendance: 0 Referee: Steven McLean

24 January 2021 Semi-final	Livingston	1–0	St Mirren	Hampden Park
16:00	Robinson 9'	Report		Attendance: 0 Referee: David Munro; Man of the Match: Robinson

28 February 2021 Final	St Johnstone	1–0	Livingston	Hampden Park
14:00	Rooney 32'	Report		Attendance: 0 Referee: Don Robertson

=== Scottish Cup ===
3 April 2021 Third Round	Livingston	2–1 (a.e.t.)	Raith Rovers	Almondvale Stadium
15:00	Fitzwater 70'; Poplatnik 109'	Report	Vaughan 13'	Attendance: 0 Referee: Bobby Madden

17 April 2021 Fourth Round	Aberdeen	2–2 (5–3 p)	Livingston	Pittodrie Stadium
17:30	McGinn 77'; Kamberi 95'	Report	Emmanuel-Thomas 37', 93 pen.'	Attendance: 0 Referee: Colin Steven

== Squad statistics ==
=== Appearances ===
As of 15 May 2021

No.	Pos	Nat	Player	Total		Premiership		League Cup		Scottish Cup	
No.	Pos	Nat	Player	Apps	Goals	Apps	Goals	Apps	Goals	Apps	Goals
1	GK	(Scotland) SCO	Robby McCrorie	18	0	16	0	1	0	1	0
2	DF	(Scotland) SCO	Nicky Devlin	46	2	35+1	2	7+1	0	2	0
3	DF	(Northern Ireland) NIR	Ciaron Brown	18	1	13+3	1	0+2	0	0	0
4	DF	(Scotland) SCO	Alan Lithgow	3	0	1+1	0	0	0	0+1	0
5	DF	(England) ENG	Jack Fitzwater	27	4	20	1	4+1	2	2	1
6	MF	(England) ENG	Marvin Bartley (c)	41	1	32+1	1	6	0	2	0
8	MF	(Scotland) SCO	Scott Pittman	47	7	37+1	7	7	0	2	0
9	FW	(England) ENG	Jay Emmanuel-Thomas	31	9	14+10	5	3+2	2	2	2
10	MF	(Scotland) SCO	Craig Sibbald	41	2	29+3	1	5+2	1	2	0
11	MF	(Scotland) SCO	Alan Forrest	38	11	21+8	4	7	7	2	0
12	DF	(France) FRA	Julien Serrano	30	2	19+5	2	5+1	0	0	0
14	FW	(Scotland) SCO	Josh Mullin	30	6	16+6	3	7	3	0+1	0
15	FW	(Slovenia) SVN	Matej Poplatnik	25	3	5+14	0	2+2	2	0+2	1
17	MF	(Scotland) SCO	Scott Robinson	31	6	16+10	4	5	2	0	0
18	MF	(Scotland) SCO	Jason Holt	37	1	24+4	1	4+3	0	2	0
19	FW	(Scotland) SCO	Salim Kouider-Aissa	4	0	0+4	0	0	0	0	0
20	FW	(Scotland) SCO	Gavin Reilly	7	0	3+2	0	0+2	0	0	0
21	DF	(Scotland) SCO	Jack McMillan	12	0	4+4	0	2+1	0	0+1	0
22	MF	(Scotland) SCO	Scott Tiffoney	13	1	4+7	1	1+1	0	0	0
23	MF	(Scotland) SCO	Jackson Longridge	13	0	9+1	0	0+1	0	2	0
25	DF	(Nigeria) NGA	Efe Ambrose	28	0	17+5	0	4+2	0	0	0
27	DF	(England) ENG	Jon Guthrie	42	4	34	4	6	0	2	0
28	MF	(France) FRA	Djibril Diani	5	0	2+2	0	0+0	0	0+1	0
29	DF	(Scotland) SCO	Aaron Taylor-Sinclair	11	1	6	0	2+2	1	0+1	0
32	GK	(Poland) POL	Max Stryjek	27	0	21	0	5	0	1	0
33	DF	(Togo) TOG	Steve Lawson	16	0	7+7	0	2	0	0	0
37	FW	(Republic of Ireland) IRL	Jaze Kabia	9	1	1+7	1	0	0	0+1	0
39	MF	(Scotland) SCO	Carlo Pignatiello	3	0	0+1	0	0+2	0	0	0
40	GK	(Scotland) SCO	Gary Maley	2	0	0	0	2	0	0	0
Players who left the club during the season
9	FW	(Scotland) SCO	Lyndon Dykes	3	2	3	2	0	0	0	0
13	FW	(Germany) GER	Lars Lokotsch	5	1	2+2	0	0+1	1	0	0
16	MF	(Scotland) SCO	Robbie Crawford	1	0	0+1	0	0	0	0	0
20	FW	(Tunisia) TUN	Aymen Souda	2	0	0+2	0	0	0	0	0
23	MF	(Italy) ITA	Raffaele De Vita	0	0	0+0	0	0+0	0	0	0
30	GK	(United States) USA	Brian Schwake	0	0	0	0	0	0	0	0
38	FW	(Scotland) SCO	Jack Hamilton	5	1	2+3	1	0	0	0	0

== Team statistics ==
=== League table ===
Pos	Team	Pld	W	D	L	GF	GA	GD	Pts	Qualification or relegation (Note: Teams play each other three times (33 matches), before the league is split into two groups (the top six and the bottom six).)
4	Aberdeen	38	15	11	12	36	38	−2	56	Qualification for the Europa Conference League second qualifying round
5	St Johnstone	38	11	12	15	36	46	−10	45	Qualification for the Europa League third qualifying round (Note: St Johnstone qualified as the 2020–21 Scottish Cup winners.)
6	Livingston	38	12	9	17	42	54	−12	45	
7	St Mirren	38	11	12	15	37	45	−8	45	
8	Motherwell	38	12	9	17	39	55	−16	45	

Rules for classification: 1) Points; 2) Goal difference; 3) Goals scored; 4) Head-to-head points; 5) Head-to-Head goal difference; 6) Play-off (only if deciding champion, UEFA competitions qualification, second stage group allocation or relegation).

=== League Cup table ===
Pos	Team	Pld	W	PW	PL	L	GF	GA	GD	Pts	Qualification	LIV	ALO	EDI	AIR	STE
1	Livingston	4	4	0	0	0	15	3	+12	12	Qualification for the Second round	—	2–1	—	4–1	—
2	Alloa Athletic	4	3	0	0	1	9	5	+4	9	Qualification for the Second round	—	—	2–1	—	4–2
3	Edinburgh City	4	1	0	1	2	5	9	−4	4		1–5	—	—	—	2–2p
4	Airdrieonians	4	1	0	0	3	3	7	−4	3		—	0–2	0–1	—	—
5	Stenhousemuir	4	0	1	0	3	4	12	−8	2		0–4	—	—	0–2	—

Rules for classification: 1) points, 2) goal difference, 3) goals scored, 4) away goals scored, 5) matches won, 6) away matches won, 7) drawing of lots.

== Transfers ==
=== Players in ===
Player	From	Fee
(Scotland) Alan Forrest	(Scotland) Ayr United	Free
(England) Jack Fitzwater	(England) West Bromwich Albion	Free
(Slovenia) Matej Poplatnik	(India) Kerala Blasters	Free
(Scotland) Salim Kouider-Aissa	(Scotland) Queen's Park	Free
(Poland) Max Stryjek	(England) Eastleigh	Free
(Scotland) Jason Holt	(Scotland) Rangers	Free
(Germany) Lars Lokotsch	(Germany) SV Rödinghausen	Free
(Republic of Ireland) Anthony Stokes	(Iran) Persepolis	Free
(England) Jay Emmanuel-Thomas	(Thailand) PTT Rayong	Free
(Scotland) Josh Mullin	(Scotland) Ross County	Free
(Scotland) Gavin Reilly	(England) Carlisle United	Free
(Republic of Ireland) Jaze Kabia	(Republic of Ireland) Shelbourne	Free
(Scotland) Jackson Longridge	(England) Bradford City	Free

=== Players out ===
Player	To	Fee
(Scotland) Craig Henderson	(Scotland) East Stirlingshire	Free
(Scotland) Ricki Lamie	(Scotland) Motherwell	Free
(Scotland) Steven Lawless	(England) Burton Albion	Free
(Scotland) Chris Erskine	(Scotland) East Kilbride	Free
(England) Hakeem Odoffin	(Scotland) Hamilton Academical	Undisclosed
(Scotland) Lyndon Dykes	(England) Queens Park Rangers	£2,000,000
(Angola) Dolly Menga		Free
(France) Cécé Pepe		Free
(Republic of Ireland) Anthony Stokes	Retired	
(Tunisia) Aymen Souda		Free
(Germany) Lars Lokotsch	(Germany) FSV Zwickau	Free
(Scotland) Robbie Crawford	(Scotland) Motherwell	Free

=== Loans in ===
Player	From	Fee
(Scotland) Robby McCrorie	(Scotland) Rangers	Loan
(Northern Ireland) Ciaron Brown	(Wales) Cardiff City	Loan
(France) Julien Serrano	(France) AS Monaco	Loan
(France) Djibril Diani	(Switzerland) Grasshopper	Loan

=== Loans out ===
Player	To	Fee
(Scotland) Ross Stewart	(Scotland) Heart of Midlothian	Loan
(Scotland) Jack Hamilton	(Scotland) East Fife	Loan
(United States) Brian Schwake	(Scotland) Linlithgow Rose	Loan
(Scotland) Salim Kouider-Aissa	(Scotland) Partick Thistle	Loan
(Scotland) Robbie Crawford	(Scotland) Motherwell	Loan
(Italy) Raffaele De Vita	(Scotland) Edinburgh City	Loan
(Germany) Lars Lokotsch	(Scotland) Raith Rovers	Loan
(Scotland) Jack Hamilton	(Scotland) Arbroath	Loan
(Scotland) Salim Kouider-Aissa	(Scotland) Queen's Park	Loan

== See also ==
List of Livingston F.C. seasons
