= Mark Hurst =

Mark Hurst may refer to:

- Mark Hurst (footballer, born 1985), English football defender
- Mark Hurst (footballer, born 1995), Scottish football goalkeeper
