= Niall Keown =

English professional footballer

Personal information
- Full name: Niall Martin Keown
- Date of birth: 5 April 1995 (age 31)
- Place of birth: Oxford, England
- Position: Defender

Youth career
- 2011–2013: Reading

Senior career*
Years	Team	Apps	(Gls)
2013–2017	Reading	2	(0)
2017	→ Partick Thistle (loan)	14	(0)
2017–2019	Partick Thistle	44	(2)
2019	→ St Johnstone (loan)	0	(0)
Total		60	(2)

International career^{‡}
2016	Republic of Ireland U21	2	(0)
- * Club domestic league appearances and goals as of 07:53, 29 January 2019 (UTC) ‡ National team caps and goals as of 17:46, 19 April 2016 (UTC)

Niall Martin Keown (born 5 April 1995) is a professional football coach and former player, who works as a youth coach at Oxford United. Keown played as a defender, beginning his career with Reading before joining Partick Thistle in 2017, initially on loan. Born in England, he has represented the Republic of Ireland under-21 team. He is the son of former Arsenal and England international Martin Keown.

== Club career ==
=== Reading ===
Keown joined the Reading Academy in 2011.

He made his debut, for Reading in their 2–1 Championship victory over Brighton & Hove Albion on 10 March 2015, coming on as a 92nd-minute substitute for Danny Williams.

Keown signed a new three-year contract with Reading on 14 July 2015.

=== Partick Thistle ===
In January 2017, Keown went on trial with Partick Thistle, featuring for them in their friendly against Lokeren, before signing on loan with Partick Thistle for the remainder of the season on 24 January 2017.

On 1 July 2017, Keown moved to Partick Thistle permanently on a two-year contract from Reading for an undisclosed fee. Following Partick Thistle's relegation at the end of the 2017–18 season, Keown was put up for sale by Thistle.

With his contract due to expire at the end of the 2018–19 season, Keown was loaned to St Johnstone in January 2019.

== International career ==
In March 2015, Keown was called up to the Republic of Ireland U21 squad being eligible through his grandmother, having previously been a back up for the England U18s. He is also eligible to play for Northern Ireland as his grandfather was from County Fermanagh. He has indicated he wishes to switch international allegiance and represent Northern Ireland.

== Career statistics ==
As of match played 10 February 2019

Appearances and goals by club, season and competition
Club	Season	League			National Cup		League Cup		Other		Total	
Club	Season	Division	Apps	Goals	Apps	Goals	Apps	Goals	Apps	Goals	Apps	Goals
Reading	2014–15	Championship	2	0	0	0	0	0	–		2	0
Reading	2015–16	Championship	0	0	0	0	0	0	–		0	0
Reading	2016–17	Championship	0	0	0	0	0	0	–		0	0
Reading	Total		2	0	0	0	0	0	0	0	2	0
Partick Thistle (loan)	2016–17	Scottish Premiership	14	0	2	0	0	0	–		16	0
Partick Thistle	2017–18	Scottish Premiership	30	2	1	0	2	0	–		33	2
Partick Thistle	2018–19	Scottish Championship	14	0	0	0	1	0	1 (Note: One appearance in the Scottish Challenge Cup)	0	16	0
Partick Thistle	Total		58	2	3	0	3	0	1	0	65	2
St Johnstone (loan)	2018–19	Scottish Premiership	0	0	1	0	–		–		1	0
Career total			60	2	4	0	3	0	1	0	68	2

== Honours ==
=== Club ===
Reading U21

- U21 Premier League Cup: 2013–14

== Personal life ==
Niall is the son of former England international Martin Keown. Through his paternal grandmother, he is eligible to play for the Republic of Ireland, and he is also eligible to play for Northern Ireland because his paternal grandfather was born in County Fermanagh.
