= Dan Pybus =

English footballer (born 1997)

Personal information
- Full name: Daniel Joseph Pybus
- Date of birth: 12 December 1997 (age 28)
- Place of birth: South Shields, England
- Height: 5 ft 10 in (1.79 m)
- Position: Midfielder

Team information
- Current team: Farnham Town
- Number: 17

Youth career
- 2014–2017: Sunderland
- 2016: → Derby County (youth loan)

Senior career*
Years	Team	Apps	(Gls)
2017–2018	Bradford City	2	(0)
2018	→ Bradford Park Avenue (loan)	4	(0)
2018	Blyth Spartans	0	(0)
2018	Tønsberg	4	(0)
2019–2021	Queen of the South	42	(1)
2021–2022	Dunfermline Athletic	32	(1)
2022–2023	York City	41	(0)
2023–2026	Dorking Wanderers	74	(2)
2024	Dorking Wanderers B	3	(1)
2025	→ Hemel Hempstead Town (loan)	3	(0)
2026–	Farnham Town	0	(0)

International career
2024	England C	1	(0)
- * Club domestic league appearances and goals as of 22:07, 22 October 2026 (UTC)

Daniel Joseph Pybus (born 12 December 1997) is an English professional footballer who plays as a midfielder for National League South club Farnham Town.. Pybus has previously played for Bradford City, Blyth Spartans, Tønsberg in Norway, Queen of the South, Dunfermline Athletic, York City and Dorking Wanderers.

== Club career ==
In March 2017, after playing youth football for Sunderland and Derby County, Pybus signed for Bradford City and debuted on 30 April 2017, as a substitute in the final league match of the 2016–17 season. In May 2017, Pybus signed a one-year extension to his contract with the Bantams. In February 2018, Pybus was sent out on loan to Bradford Park Avenue and departed the Bantams by mutual consent in April 2018.

On 8 September 2018, Pybus signed for National League North club Blyth Spartans and only stayed at the club for four days and signed for the Norwegian club Tønsberg later that week.

In July 2019, Pybus signed a one-year contract with Scottish Championship club Queen of the South. On 21 December 2019, Pybus scored his first senior career goal in the 33rd minute versus Arbroath at Palmerston Park in a 2–0 win in the Scottish Championship. After initially being released by the Doonhamers in the wake of the COVID-19 pandemic in Scotland, on 24 August 2020, Pybus signed once again for the Palmerston Park club on a one-year deal until 31 May 2021.

After departing from the Dumfries club at the end of his contract, Pybus signed for fellow Scottish Championship side Dunfermline Athletic on a one-year deal. Following the team's relegation in the play-offs, his contract was not extended and he left the club at the end of the season.

On 2 August 2022, Pybus signed for newly promoted National League club York City. Pybus made 41 appearances for York City before joining Dorking Wanderers on a three-year contract in August 2023. In February 2025, Pybus joined Hemel Hempstead Town on an initial one-month loan deal. On 19 November 2026, Pybus departed Dorking Wanderers by mutual consent.

The day after departing Dorking Wanderers, Pybus completed a move to Farnham Town, signing a contract until June 2029.

== International career ==
Pybus was called up to represent the England C team in March 2024. On 19 March, he made his debut in the 1–0 defeat to the Wales C team at Stebonheath Park.

== Career statistics ==
As of 10 October 2026

Appearances and goals by club, season and competition
Club	Season	League			National cup		League cup		Other		Total	
Club	Season	Division	Apps	Goals	Apps	Goals	Apps	Goals	Apps	Goals	Apps	Goals
Bradford City	2016–17	League One	1	0	0	0	0	0	0	0	1	0
Bradford City	2017–18	League One	1	0	0	0	1	0	4	0	6	0
Bradford City	Total		2	0	0	0	1	0	4	0	7	0
Bradford Park Avenue (loan)	2017–18	National League North	4	0	0	0	0	0	0	0	4	0
Blyth Spartans	2018–19	National League North	0	0	0	0	0	0	0	0	0	0
Queen of the South	2019–20	Scottish Championship	26	1	1	0	4	0	1	0	32	1
Queen of the South	2020–21	Scottish Championship	16	0	1	0	3	0	0	0	20	0
Queen of the South	Total		42	1	2	0	7	0	1	0	52	1
Dunfermline Athletic	2021–22	Scottish Championship	32	1	0	0	5	0	1	0	38	1
York City	2022–23	National League	39	0	1	0	—		3	0	43	0
York City	2023–24	National League	2	0	0	0	—		0	0	2	0
York City	Total		41	0	1	0	0	0	3	0	45	0
Dorking Wanderers	2023–24	National League	33	1	1	0	—		1	0	35	1
Dorking Wanderers	2024–25	National League South	11	0	1	0	—		0	0	12	0
Dorking Wanderers	2025–26	National League South	23	1	3	0	—		3	0	29	1
Dorking Wanderers	2026–27	National League South	7	0	3	0	—		0	0	10	0
Dorking Wanderers	Total		74	2	8	0	0	0	4	0	86	2
Dorking Wanderers B	2024–25	Southern Combination League Division One	3	1	—		—		0	0	3	1
Hemel Hempstead Town (loan)	2024–25	National League South	3	0	0	0	—		0	0	3	0
Farnham Town	2026–27	National League South	0	0	—		—		—		0	0
Career total			201	5	11	0	13	0	13	0	229	5
