= 2017–18 Partick Thistle F.C. season =

Partick Thistle
2017–18 season
- Chairman: David Beattie
- Manager: Alan Archibald
- Stadium: Firhill Stadium, Glasgow
- Scottish Premiership: 11th (Relegated)
- League Cup: Quarter-final
- Scottish Cup: Fifth round
- Top goalscorer: League: Kris Doolan & Conor Sammon (7); All: Kris Doolan (11)
- Highest home attendance: 8,264 vs. Rangers, Premiership, 15 September 2017
- Lowest home attendance: 2,185 vs. Stranraer, League Cup, 29 July 2017
- Average home league attendance: 4,441
Home colours	Away colours

The 2017–18 season was Partick Thistle's fifth consecutive season in the top flight of Scottish football and the fifth in the newly established Scottish Premiership, having been promoted from the Scottish First Division at the end of the 2012–13 season.

== Season summary ==
Thistle competed in the 2017–18 Scottish League Cup where they finished second in Group H behind Livingston by 1 point and qualified for the Second Round. In the second round they surpassed St Johnstone and in the Quarter Finals took Rangers to extra time after Kris Doolan scored an injury time equaliser to make it 1–1, however lost 3–1 after extra time. Partick Thistle also competed in the Scottish Cup, where they lost in an away tie to Celtic in the fifth round. They ended the season being relegated from the Premiership via the play-offs, dropping to the Scottish Championship.

== Competitions ==
=== Scottish Premiership ===
5 August 2017 1	Hibernian	3 – 1	Partick Thistle	Edinburgh
15:00 BST (UTC+1)	Boyle 14'; Whittaker 33'; Ambrose (yellow card) 45+1'; S.Murray 52' (pen.); McGinn (yellow card) 84'	Report	Erskine 7' (yellow card) 70'; Bannigan (yellow card) 34'; Elliott (yellow card) 55'	Stadium: Easter Road; Attendance: 17,634; Referee: Nick Walsh

11 August 2017 2	Partick Thistle	0 – 1	Celtic	Glasgow
19:45 BST (UTC+1)	Bannigan (yellow card) 71'	Report	Ntcham 25'; Tierney (yellow card) 86'	Stadium: Firhill Stadium; Attendance: 8,041; Referee: Andrew Dallas

19 August 2017 3	St Johnstone	1 – 0	Partick Thistle	Perth
15:00 BST (UTC+1)	O'Halloran 33'	Report	Lawless (yellow card) 44'; Storey (yellow card) 86'	Stadium: McDiarmid Park; Attendance: 3,470; Referee: Barry Cook

26 August 2017 4	Partick Thistle	3 – 4	Aberdeen	Glasgow
15:00 BST (UTC+1)	Erskine 8'; Doolan 13'; Keown 54' (yellow card) 49' (yellow-red card) 90+1'; Turnbull (yellow card) 68'	Report	Christie 5'; McLean 42' (pen.); Wright 52'; Rooney 84'	Stadium: Firhill Stadium; Attendance: 4,768; Referee: Bobby Madden

9 September 2017 5	Ross County	1 – 1	Partick Thistle	Dingwall
15:00 BST (UTC+1)	Davies (yellow card) 45'; Kelly (yellow card) 58'; Routis (yellow card) 61'; Schalk 86' (pen.)	Report	Devine (yellow card) 7'; Spittal 22'	Stadium: Global Energy Stadium; Attendance: 3,660; Referee: John Beaton

15 September 2017 6	Partick Thistle	2 – 2	Rangers	Glasgow
19:45 BST (UTC+1)	McGinn (yellow card) 45'; Keown (yellow card) 46'; Spittal 50'; Erskine 60' (red card) 67'; Turnbull (yellow card) 79'; Elliott (yellow card) 83'; Bannigan (yellow card) 88'	Report	Morelos 19'; Dorrans 77'	Stadium: Firhill Stadium; Attendance: 8,264; Referee: Willie Collum

23 September 2017 7	Partick Thistle	1 – 1	Heart of Midlothian	Glasgow
16:00 BST (UTC+1)	Spittal 18'; Devine (yellow card) 88'	Report	Berra (yellow card) 35'; Walker (yellow card) 75'; Callachan 80'	Stadium: Firhill Stadium; Attendance: 4,671; Referee: Don Robertson

30 September 2017 8	Motherwell	3 – 0	Partick Thistle	Motherwell
15:00 BST (UTC+1)	Hartley 7'; Tanner 56'; Bowman 82'	Report	Černý (yellow card) 6'; Barton (yellow card) 33'; Lawless (yellow card) 85'; Edwards (yellow card) 87'	Stadium: Fir Park; Attendance: 4,692; Referee: Greg Aitken

14 October 2017 9	Partick Thistle	0 – 2	Kilmarnock	Glasgow
15:00 BST (UTC+1)	Barton (yellow card) 13'	Report	Boyd 39'; Frizzell 63'; Taylor (yellow card) 81'	Stadium: Firhill Stadium; Attendance: 3,662; Referee: Kevin Clancy

21 October 2017 10	Partick Thistle	2 – 1	Dundee	Glasgow
15:00 BST (UTC+1)	Černý (yellow card) 21'; Turnbull (yellow card) 45'; Edwards 75' (yellow card) 81'; Keown (yellow card) 90'; Storey 90+2'	Report	Leitch-Smith 8' (penalty missed) 22'; Deacon (yellow card) 59'; O'Dea (yellow card) 83'	Stadium: Firhill Stadium; Attendance: 3,358; Referee: Euan Anderson

24 October 2017 11	Hamilton Academical	0 – 0	Partick Thistle	Hamilton
19:45 BST (UTC+1)	Boyd (yellow card) 14'	Report	Keown (yellow card) 45'; Turnbull (yellow card) 65'	Stadium: New Douglas Park; Attendance: 2,236; Referee: Steven McLean

28 October 2017 12	Partick Thistle	1 – 0	St Johnstone	Glasgow
15:00 BST (UTC+1)	Storey 74'	Report	Craig (yellow card) 45+1'	Stadium: Firhill Stadium; Attendance: 2,870; Referee: John Beaton

4 November 2017 13	Rangers	3 – 0	Partick Thistle	Glasgow
15:00 GMT (UTC)	McCrorie 30'; Candeias 39'; Windass 47'	Report	Doolan (yellow card) 60'; Devine (yellow card) 82'	Stadium: Ibrox Stadium; Attendance: 49,502; Referee: Willie Collum

19 November 2017 14	Heart of Midlothian	1 – 1	Partick Thistle	Edinburgh
15:00 GMT (UTC)	Gonçalves 54'; Brandon (yellow card) 71'	Report	Barton (yellow card) 8'; Doolan 85'; Devine (yellow card) 86'	Stadium: Tynecastle Stadium; Attendance: 16,999; Referee: Andrew Dallas

25 November 2017 P	Celtic	P – P	Partick Thistle	Glasgow
GMT (UTC)				Stadium: Partick Thistle

2 December 2017 15	Partick Thistle	0 – 1	Hibernian	Glasgow
15:00 GMT (UTC)	Turnbull (yellow card) 47'	Report	Barton 48' (o.g.)	Stadium: Firhill Stadium; Attendance: 4,997; Referee: Craig Thomson

9 December 2017 16	Kilmarnock	5 – 1	Partick Thistle	Kilmarnock
15:00 GMT (UTC)	Boyd 12', 79' (pen.); Brophy 20', 65'; Keown 60' (o.g.)	Report	Erskine 16'; Edwards (yellow card) 65'; Turnbull (yellow card) 79'; McGinn (yellow card) 89'	Stadium: Rugby Park; Attendance: 4,339; Referee: Bobby Madden

13 December 2017 17	Partick Thistle	3 – 2	Motherwell	Glasgow
19:45 GMT (UTC)	Spittal 16'; Edwards 22'; Sammon 28'; McGinn (yellow card) 90+2'	Report	Bowman 56' (yellow card) 70'; Tanner 79'	Stadium: Firhill Stadium; Attendance: 2,452; Referee: Don Robertson

16 December 2017 18	Dundee	3 – 0	Partick Thistle	Dundee
15:00 GMT (UTC)	Moussa 19' (pen.), 65' (pen.); O'Hara 35'	Report		Stadium: Dens Park; Attendance: 5,101; Referee: Greg Aitken

20 December 2017 19	Celtic	2 – 0	Partick Thistle	Glasgow
GMT (UTC)	Armstrong 35'; Tierney 67'	BBC Sport; Celtic Report		Stadium: Celtic Park; Attendance: 54,187; Referee: Alan Muir

23 December 2017 20	Partick Thistle	1 – 0	Hamilton	Glasgow
15:00	Keown 26'	BBC Report		Stadium: Firhill Stadium; Attendance: 2,912; Referee: Bobby Madden

27 December 2017 21	Aberdeen	1 – 0	Partick Thistle	Aberdeen
	Rooney 61'	BBC Report	Devine (yellow card) 86'	Stadium: Pittodrie Stadium; Attendance: 14,830; Referee: Euan Anderson

30 December 2017 22	Ross County	0 – 2	Partick Thistle	Dingwall
15:00 GMT		BBC Report	Doolan 35'; Sammon 86'	Stadium: Global Energy Stadium; Attendance: 2,870; Referee: Stephen Finnie

23 January 2018 23	Partick Thistle	1 – 2	Celtic	Glasgow
	Sammon 34' (pen.)	BBC Sport; Celtic Report	Sinclair 55' (pen.); Griffiths 70'	Stadium: Firhill Stadium; Attendance: 6,920; Referee: John Beaton

27 January 2018 24	St Johnstone	1 – 3	Partick	Perth
15:00	Craig 74' (pen.)	BBC Report	Lawless 13'; Sammon 64'; Edwards 90+4'	Stadium: McDiarmid Park; Attendance: 2,848; Referee: Gavin Duncan

3 February 2018 25	Motherwell	1 – 1	Partick Thistle	Motherwell
15:00 GMT (UTC)	Tait (yellow card) 52'; McHugh (yellow card) 66'; Çiftçi 79'	Report	Osman (yellow card) 43'; Doolan 53'; McGinn (yellow card) 61'; Dumbuya (yellow card) 74'; Edwards (yellow card) 89'	Stadium: Fir Park; Attendance: 4,607; Referee: Nick Walsh

6 February 2018 26	Partick Thistle	0 – 2	Rangers	Glasgow
19:45		BBC Report	Windass 39'; Tavernier 58'	Stadium: Firhill Stadium; Attendance: 7,332; Referee: Alan Muir

17 February 2018 27	Partick Thistle	1 – 2	Dundee	Glasgow
	Sammon 42'	BBC Report	Murray 84', 90'	Stadium: Firhill Stadium; Attendance: 4,267; Referee: William Collum

24 February 2018 28	Hamilton Academical	2 – 1	Partick Thistle	Hamilton
	Sarris (yellow card) 9'; Rojano 11'; Imrie (yellow card) 41'; Ferguson (yellow card) 56'; Jenkins (yellow card) 69'; Templeton 90'	BBC Report	Sammon 9' (pen.); Osman (yellow card) 85'; Erskine (yellow card) 88'	Stadium: New Douglas Park; Attendance: 2,243; Referee: Walsh

10 March 2018 29	Partick Thistle	0 – 0	Aberdeen	Glasgow
15:00 GMT	Elliott (yellow card) 84'	BBC Report		Stadium: Firhill Stadium; Attendance: 3,931; Referee: Greg Aitken

17 March 2018 30	Heart of Midlothian	3 – 0	Partick Thistle	Edinburgh
15:00	Lafferty 17'; Naismith 21'; Souttar 44'	BBC Report		Stadium: Tynecastle Park; Attendance: 17,179; Referee: Anderson

31 March 2018 31	Hibernian	2 – 0	Partick Thistle	Edinburgh
	Maclaren 71'; Hanlon 76'	BBC Sport	Devine (red card) 86'	Stadium: Easter Road; Attendance: 17,497; Referee: Dallas

3 April 2018 32	Ross County	4 – 0	Partick Thistle	Dingwall
	Lindsay (yellow card) 14'; Schalk 35', 56', 72'; Draper 41'	BBC Report	Keown (yellow card) 65'	Stadium: Global Energy Stadium; Attendance: 3,944; Referee: William Collum

7 April 2018 33	Partick Thistle	0 – 1	Kilmarnock	Glasgow
	Elliott (yellow card) 64'	Report	Findlay 35'; Mulumbu (yellow card) 48'	Stadium: Firhill Stadium; Attendance: 3,662; Referee: Kevin Clancy

21 April 2018 34	Partick Thistle	2 – 1	Hamilton	Firhill Stadium
	Doolan 64'; Edwards 72'	Report	Templeton 43'	Attendance: 3,839; Referee: John Beaton

28 April 2018 35	St Johnstone	1 – 1	Partick Thistle	McDiarmid Park
	Shaughnessy 39'	Report	Sammon 89' (pen.)	Attendance: 2,925; Referee: Alan Muir

4 May 2018 36	Partick Thistle	1 – 1	Ross County	Firhill Stadium
	Erskine 21'	Report	Mckay 42'	Attendance: 4,312; Referee: Kevin Clancy

8 May 2018 37	Partick Thistle	0 – 1	Motherwell	Firhill Stadium
	Edwards (yellow card) 90+1'	Report	Bowman 60' (yellow card) 75'; Campbell (yellow card) 67'	Attendance: 3,320; Referee: Bobby Madden

12 May 2018 38	Dundee	0 – 1	Partick Thistle	Dens Park
		Report	Doolan 63'	Attendance: 6,756; Referee: Steven McLean

=== Premiership Play-off Final ===
17 May 2018 First leg	Livingston	2 – 1	Partick Thistle	Livingston
19:45	Jacobs 13'; Byrne (yellow card) 42'; Thompson (yellow card) 45+1'; Pittman 74'	BBC Report	Doolan 10'; Devine (yellow card) 51'	Stadium: Almondvale Stadium; Attendance: 5,469; Referee: Craig Thomson

20 May 2018 Second leg	Partick Thistle	0 – 1 (1–3 agg.)	Livingston	Glasgow
15:30	Elliott (yellow card) 4'; Barton (yellow card) 31'	BBC Report	Thompson (yellow card) 32'; Jacobs 46'; Lithgow (yellow card) 90'	Stadium: Firhill Stadium; Attendance: 7,122; Referee: John Beaton

=== Scottish League Cup ===
==== Group stage ====
15 July 2017 1	Livingston	1 – 1 (3 – 1 p)	Partick Thistle	Livingston
15:00 BST (UTC+1)	Jacobs 46'; Mackin (yellow card) 87'	Report	Erskine 14'; Devine (yellow card) 90+1'	Stadium: Almondvale Stadium; Attendance: 1,119; Referee: Kevin Clancy
	Penalties
	Mackin (penalty scored); J.Mullin (penalty scored); Jacobs (penalty scored)		(penalty scored) Bannigan; (penalty missed) Elliott; (penalty missed) Spittal; (penalty missed) Doolan

22 July 2017 2	Partick Thistle	5 – 0	St Mirren	Glasgow
15:00 BST (UTC+1)	Doolan 12'; Lawless 23', 33'; Spittal 38', 59'; Bannigan (yellow card) 43'; Osman (yellow card) 47' (yellow-red card) 58'	Report	Baird (yellow card) 37'; Smith (yellow card) 46'	Stadium: Firhill Park; Attendance: 2,727; Referee: Stephen Finnie

25 July 2017 3	Airdrieonians	1 – 2	Partick Thistle	Airdrie
19:45 BST (UTC+1)	D.Cairns 55'	Report	Doolan 10'; Spittal 40'	Stadium: Excelsior Stadium; Attendance: 1,255; Referee: Don Robertson

29 July 2017 4	Partick Thistle	1 – 0	Stranraer	Glasgow
15:00 BST (UTC+1)	Elliott 87'	Report		Stadium: Firhill Park; Attendance: 2,185; Referee: John Beaton

==== Knockout round ====
8 August 2017 Second round	St Johnstone	0 – 3	Partick Thistle	Perth
19:45 BST (UTC+1)	Lawless 50' (pen.); Edwards 62'; Erskine 90'; Nisbet (yellow card) 90+2'	Report	O'Halloran (yellow card) 23'; Davidson (yellow card) 82'; Foster (yellow card) 85'	Stadium: McDiarmid Park; Attendance: 2,619; Referee: Euan Anderson

19 September 2017 Quarter Final	Partick Thistle	1 – 3 (a.e.t.)	Rangers	Glasgow
19:45 BST (UTC+1)	Lawless (yellow card) 13'; Doolan 90+1'; Elliott (yellow card) 109'	Report	Peña 55'; Candeias 94'; Herrera 99'; Hodson (yellow card) 114'	Stadium: Firhill Stadium; Attendance: 7,394; Referee: Steven McLean

=== Scottish Challenge Cup ===
15 August 2017 First Round	Partick Thistle U20s	6 – 1	University of Stirling	Glasgow
19:45 BST (UTC+1)	McLaughlin 15', 57', 79' (yellow card) 22'; M.Lamont 52'; Nisbet 60'; Fitzpatrick 67'; Penrice (yellow card) 90'	Report	Lyons 75'	Stadium: Firhill Stadium; Referee: Stewart Luke

1 September 2017 Second Round	Stranraer	2 – 0	Partick Thistle U20s	Stranraer
19:45 BST (UTC+1)	Wallace 33'; D.Stoney 90+1'	Report	McCarthy (yellow card) 57'; M.Lamont (yellow card) 72'	Stadium: Stair Park; Attendance: 228; Referee: Steven Reid

=== Scottish Cup ===
20 January 2018 Fourth round	Queen of the South	1 – 2	Partick Thistle	Dumfries
15:00 GMT (UTC)	Dykes (yellow card) 51'; Fergusson 55'	BBC Report	Sammon 42', 81'; McGinn (yellow card) 68'	Stadium: Palmerston Park; Attendance: 2,338; Referee: Collum

10 February 2018 Fifth round	Celtic	3 – 2	Partick Thistle	Glasgow
	Forrest 3', 10', 54'	BBC Sport	Doolan 20'; Sammon 84'	Stadium: Celtic Park; Attendance: 24,191; Referee: Steven McLean

== Squad statistics ==
=== Appearances ===
No.	Pos	Nat	Player	Total		Scottish Premiership		Scottish Cup		Scottish League Cup	
No.	Pos	Nat	Player	Apps	Goals	Apps	Goals	Apps	Goals	Apps	Goals
1	GK	(Czech Republic) CZE	Tomáš Černý	43	0	36	0	2	0	5	0
2	DF	(Sierra Leone) SLE	Mustapha Dumbuya	5	0	4+1	0	0	0	0	0
3	DF	(Scotland) SCO	Callum Booth	20	0	12+2	0	2	0	4	0
4	DF	(England) ENG	Baily Cargill	19	0	18	0	1	0	0	0
5	DF	(Republic of Ireland) IRL	Niall Keown	33	2	30	2	1	0	1+1	0
6	MF	(Ghana) GHA	Abdul Osman	18	0	12+1	0	1+1	0	3	0
7	MF	(Scotland) SCO	Blair Spittal	42	6	25+10	4	2	0	5	2
8	MF	(Scotland) SCO	Stuart Bannigan	12	0	4+2	0	0	0	3+3	0
9	FW	(Scotland) SCO	Kris Doolan	42	11	20+15	7	1+1	1	3+2	3
10	MF	(Scotland) SCO	Chris Erskine	36	7	20+9	5	2	0	5	2
11	MF	(Scotland) SCO	Steven Lawless	36	4	23+6	1	1	0	6	3
12	GK	(Scotland) SCO	Ryan Scully	7	0	4+2	0	0	0	1	0
13	MF	(Northern Ireland) NIR	Adam Barton	43	0	29+6	0	2	0	6	0
14	DF	(England) ENG	Christie Elliott	24	1	18	0	0	0	6	1
15	DF	(Northern Ireland) NIR	Danny Devine	34	0	27	0	1	0	6	0
16	DF	(Scotland) SCO	Paul McGinn	31	0	27+1	0	2	0	1	0
18	FW	(Republic of Ireland) IRL	Conor Sammon	36	10	22+11	7	1+1	3	1	0
19	MF	(Australia) AUS	Ryan Edwards	46	5	31+7	4	2	0	4+2	1
23	GK	(Scotland) SCO	Jamie Sneddon	0	0	0	0	0	0	0	0
24	MF	(Scotland) SCO	Andrew McCarthy	20	0	11+5	0	0+2	0	0+2	0
31	MF	(Scotland) SCO	Callum Wilson	0	0	0	0	0	0	0	0
37	MF	(Scotland) SCO	Martin Woods	21	0	18+2	0	1	0	0	0
39	FW	(England) ENG	Miles Storey	35	2	24+11	2	0	0	0	0
Players who left the club during the season:
4	DF	(England) ENG	Jordan Turnbull	21	0	19	0	0	0	2	0
17	DF	(Czech Republic) CZE	Milan Nitrianský	7	0	4+3	0	0	0	0	0
20	FW	(Scotland) SCO	Kevin Nisbet	12	0	0+6	0	0	0	2+4	0
21	DF	(Scotland) SCO	James Penrice	4	0	2	0	0	0	2	0
22	MF	(Scotland) SCO	Gary Fraser	5	0	0+5	0	0	0	0	0
26	FW	(Scotland) SCO	Neil McLaughlin	1	0	0	0	0	0	0+1	0

- Scottish Premiership matches includes play-off games against Livingston.

=== Goal Scorers ===
Ranking	Position	Nation	Number	Name	Scottish Premiership	Scottish Cup	Scottish League Cup	Total
1	FW	(Scotland)	9	Kris Doolan	7	1	3	11
2	FW	(Republic of Ireland)	18	Conor Sammon	7	3	0	10
3	MF	(Scotland)	7	Blair Spittal	4	0	3	7
4	MF	(Scotland)	10	Chris Erskine	5	0	2	7
5	MF	(Australia)	19	Ryan Edwards	4	0	1	5
5	MF	(Scotland)	11	Steven Lawless	1	0	3	4
7	DF	(Republic of Ireland)	5	Niall Keown	2	0	0	2
7	FW	(England)	39	Miles Storey	2	0	0	2
9	DF	(England)	14	Christie Elliott	0	0	1	1
TOTALS					32	4	13	49

=== Disciplinary record ===
Position	Nation	Number	Name	Scottish Premiership		Scottish Cup		League Cup		Total	
Position	Nation	Number	Name	Yellow card	Red card	Yellow card	Red card	Yellow card	Red card	Yellow card	Red card
GK	(Czech Republic)	1	Tomáš Černý	4	0	0	0	0	0	4	0
DF	(Sierra Leone)	2	Mustapha Dumbuya	1	0	0	0	0	0	1	0
DF	(England)	3	Callum Booth	1	0	0	0	0	0	1	0
DF	(England)	4	Jordan Turnbull	7	0	0	0	0	0	7	0
DF	(England)	4	Baily Cargill	1	0	0	0	0	0	1	0
DF	(Republic of Ireland)	5	Niall Keown	8	1	0	0	0	0	8	1
MF	(Ghana)	6	Abdul Osman	3	0	0	0	2	1	5	1
MF	(Scotland)	8	Stuart Bannigan	3	0	0	0	1	0	4	0
FW	(Scotland)	9	Kris Doolan	1	0	0	0	0	0	1	0
MF	(Scotland)	10	Chris Erskine	4	1	0	0	0	0	4	1
MF	(Scotland)	11	Steven Lawless	2	0	0	0	1	0	3	0
MF	(Northern Ireland)	13	Adam Barton	5	0	0	0	0	0	5	0
DF	(England)	14	Christie Elliott	6	0	0	0	1	0	7	0
DF	(Northern Ireland)	15	Danny Devine	8	1	1	0	1	0	10	1
DF	(Scotland)	16	Paul McGinn	6	0	1	0	0	0	7	0
FW	(Republic of Ireland)	18	Conor Sammon	1	0	0	0	0	0	1	0
MF	(Australia)	19	Ryan Edwards	6	0	0	0	0	0	6	0
FW	(Scotland)	20	Kevin Nisbet	0	0	0	0	1	0	1	0
DF	(Scotland)	21	James Penrice	1	0	0	0	0	0	1	0
MF	(Scotland)	22	Gary Fraser	1	0	0	0	0	0	1	0
MF	(Scotland)	24	Andrew McCarthy	2	0	0	0	0	0	2	0
MF	(Scotland)	37	Martin Woods	4	0	0	0	0	0	4	0
FW	(England)	39	Miles Storey	3	0	0	0	0	0	3	0
TOTALS				78	3	2	0	7	1	87	4

== Team statistics ==
=== League table ===
Pos	Team	Pld	W	D	L	GF	GA	GD	Pts	Qualification or relegation (Note: Teams play each other three times (33 matches) before the league is split into two groups (the top six and the bottom six).)
8	St Johnstone	38	12	10	16	42	53	−11	46	
9	Dundee	38	11	6	21	36	57	−21	39	
10	Hamilton Academical	38	9	6	23	47	68	−21	33	
11	Partick Thistle (R)	38	8	9	21	31	61	−30	33	Qualification for the Premiership play-off final
12	Ross County (R)	38	6	11	21	40	62	−22	29	Relegation to the Championship

Source: Soccerway BBC
Rules for classification: 1) Points; 2) Goal difference; 3) Goals scored; 4) Play-off (only if deciding champion, UEFA competitions qualification and second-stage group allocation).
(R) Relegated

=== League Cup Table ===
Pos	Team	Pld	W	PW	PL	L	GF	GA	GD	Pts	Qualification	LIV	PAR	STM	AIR	STR
1	Livingston (Q)	4	3	1	0	0	8	3	+5	11	Qualification for the Second Round	—	p1–1	—	2–0	—
2	Partick Thistle (Q)	4	3	0	1	0	9	2	+7	10	Qualification for the Second Round	—	—	5–0	—	1–0
3	St Mirren	4	2	0	0	2	9	7	+2	6		0–1	—	—	5–0	—
4	Airdrieonians	4	1	0	0	3	4	10	−6	3		—	1–2	—	—	3–1
5	Stranraer	4	0	0	0	4	4	12	−8	0		2–4	—	1–4	—	—

Rules for classification: 1) goal difference, 2) goals scored, 3) away goals scored, 4) matches won, 5) away matches won, 6) drawing of lots.
(Q) Qualified to the phase indicated

== Transfers ==
=== In ===
Date	Position	Nationality	Name	From	Fee
15 June 2017	GK	(Scotland)	Jamie Sneddon	Cowdenbeath	Free
15 June 2017	MF	(Scotland)	Blair Spittal	Dundee United	Free
1 July 2017	DF	(Republic of Ireland)	Niall Keown	Reading	Undisclosed
4 August 2017	DF	(Czech Republic)	Milan Nitrianský	Bohemians 1905	Free
11 August 2017	FW	(England)	Miles Storey	Aberdeen	Undisclosed
31 August 2017	DF	(Scotland)	Paul McGinn	Chesterfield	Free
27 October 2017	MF	(Scotland)	Martin Woods	Ross County	Free

=== Out ===
Date	Position	Nationality	Name	To	Fee
24 May 2017	FW	(England)	David Amoo	Cambridge United	Free
31 May 2017	DF	(Scotland)	Dominic Docherty	Queen's Park	Free
31 May 2017	DF	(Scotland)	Matthew McInally	Cowdenbeath	Free
31 May 2017	DF	(Scotland)	Michael McMullin	Albion Rovers	Free
31 May 2017	MF	(Scotland)	Sean Welsh	Falkirk	Free
22 June 2017	DF	(Scotland)	Liam Lindsay	Barnsley	Undisclosed
26 June 2017	MF	(Scotland)	David Wilson	Dumbarton	Free
3 July 2017	GK	(Scotland)	Mark Ridgers	Inverness Caledonian Thistle	Free
5 July 2017	FW	(England)	Ade Azeez	Cambridge United	Undisclosed
2 January 2018	MF	(Scotland)	Sean Welsh	Falkirk	Free
31 January 2018	DF	(Czech Republic)	Milan Nitrianský	České Budějovice	Free

=== Loans in ===
Date from	Date to	Position	Nationality	Name	From
31 July 2017	End of season	DF	(England)	Jordan Turnbull	Coventry City
11 August 2017	End of season	FW	(Republic of Ireland)	Conor Sammon	Heart of Midlothian
23 January 2018	End of season	DF	(England)	Baily Cargill	Bournemouth

=== Loans out ===
Date from	Date to	Position	Nationality	Name	To
31 August 2017		FW	(Scotland)	Mark Lamont	Clyde
17 August 2017	End of season	FW	(Scotland)	Neil McLaughlin	Stirling Albion
18 August 2017	7 January 2018	DF	(Scotland)	James Penrice	Livingston
22 January 2018	End of season	FW	(Scotland)	Kevin Nisbet	Dumbarton
13 March 2018	21 May 2018	DF	(Scotland)	Gary Fraser	Greenock Morton

== See also ==
- List of Partick Thistle F.C. seasons
