= Salim Kouider-Aïssa =

Scottish footballer

Personal information
- Date of birth: 22 March 1996 (age 30)
- Place of birth: Glasgow, Scotland
- Position: Forward

Youth career
- Heart of Midlothian
- Motherwell

Senior career*
Years	Team	Apps	(Gls)
2013–2014	Stenhousemuir	8	(0)
2014–2015	Queen of the South	0	(0)
2015–2018	Stirling Albion	3	(0)
2018	Lenzie Thistle		
2018–2019	Kilsyth Rangers		
2019–2020	Queen's Park	28	(13)
2020–2021	Livingston	4	(0)
2020–2021	→ Partick Thistle (loan)	1	(0)
2021	→ Queens Park (loan)	13	(3)
2021–2023	Airdrieonians	18	(4)
2022–2023	→ Stranraer (loan)	9	(1)
- * Club domestic league appearances and goals as of 18:04, 21 May 2023 (UTC)

Salim Kouider-Aïssa (born 22 March 1996) is a Scottish professional footballer who plays as a forward. In May 2023 he was convicted of sexual assault.

== Career ==
Born in Glasgow, Kouider-Aïssa played youth football with Heart of Midlothian and Motherwell, and spent his early senior career with Stenhousemuir, Queen of the South and Stirling Albion. After a spell in non-league football with Lenzie Thistle and Kilsyth Rangers and time back in the League with Queen's Park, he signed for Livingston in July 2020 following a successful trial with the club. Prior to signing for Livingston, he worked as a scaffolder on construction sites.

On 16 September 2020 he signed on loan for Partick Thistle for the 2020–21 season. However, after making just one league appearance for Thistle, Kouider-Aïssa was recalled by his parent club on 15 January 2021, after suffering a 'freak' injury. On 9 March 2021, Kouider-Aïssa returned to former club Queens Park, on loan until the end of the season.

Kouider-Aïssa moved to Airdrieonians on 8 July 2021, but he suffered a knee ligament injury that prevented him from playing for most of the 2021–22 season. He was loaned to Stranraer in September 2022, and would remain there until January 2023. He was sacked by Airdrie in May 2023, days after he had been convicted of sexual assault.

== Personal life ==
Kouider-Aïssa's father is Algerian and his mother is Scottish. He is the nephew of fellow footballer Kevin McGoldrick, who was also his manager at Kilsyth Rangers.

=== Sexual assault conviction ===
In May 2023, Kouider-Aïssa was convicted of sexually assaulting a sleeping woman. On 21 July 2023, he was sentenced to two years in prison.

== Career statistics ==
As of 15 May 2021

Appearances and goals by club, season and competition
Club	Season	League			Cup		League Cup		Other		Total	
Club	Season	Division	Apps	Goals	Apps	Goals	Apps	Goals	Apps	Goals	Apps	Goals
Stenhousemuir	2012–13	Scottish Division Two	7	0	0	0	0	0	—		7	0
Stenhousemuir	2013–14	Scottish League Two	1	0	0	0	0	0	—		1	0
Stenhousemuir	Total		8	0	0	0	0	0	0	0	8	0
Queen of the South	2014–15	Scottish Championship	0	0	0	0	0	0	—		0	0
Stirling Albion	2015–16	Scottish League Two	3	0	0	0	2	0	—		5	0
Queens Park	2019–20	Scottish League Two	28	13	3	2	4	1	1	1	36	17
Livingston	2020–21	Scottish Premiership	4	0	0	0	0	0	—		4	0
Partick Thistle (loan)	2020–21	Scottish League One	1	0	0	0	2	0	—		3	0
Queens Park (loan)	2020–21	Scottish League Two	13	3	0	0	0	0	—		13	3
Career total			57	16	3	2	8	1	1	1	69	20
