= Callum Semple =

English footballer

Personal information
- Date of birth: 20 September 1998 (age 28)
- Place of birth: Sheffield, England
- Height: 1.85 m (6 ft 1 in)
- Position: Centre-back

Youth career
- Sheffield United

Senior career*
Years	Team	Apps	(Gls)
2018–2019	Sheffield United	0	(0)
2018–2019	→ Queen of the South (loan)	18	(1)
2019	Ross County	4	(0)
2019–2020	Queen of the South	11	(2)
- * Club domestic league appearances and goals

Callum Semple (born 20 September 1998) is an English former professional footballer, who played as a centre-back. Semple has previously played for Sheffield United's youth academy, Ross County and Queen of the South.

== Background ==
Callum Semple was born and raised in Sheffield. Semple's parents are from Scotland, giving him eligibility to represent England and Scotland at international level.

== Career ==
=== Sheffield United and Queen of the South loan ===
Semple is a product of the Blades youth academy. On 13 July 2018, Semple was sent out on loan by Sheffield United to Queen of the South in Dumfries until early January 2019. On 4 August 2018, Semple scored his solitary goal for Queens in their first league match of the 2018-19 season at Cappielow versus Greenock Morton in a 2–2 draw. On 6 January 2019, Semple returned to Bramall Lane after playing for the Doonhamers in their 2–1 away win versus Inverness Caledonian Thistle. Semple played in 27 competitive matches and scored one goal for Queens.

=== Ross County ===
On 22 January 2019, Semple signed for the Doonhamers rivals in the Scottish Championship, the Dingwall club Ross County on an 18-month deal.

In his first interview with the Staggies, Semple said that the club had chatted with Gary Naysmith at Queens and he had given Semple a glowing reference.

=== Queen of the South ===
On 24 June 2019, Semple signed a one-year contract with Queen of the South after being released by the Staggies.

On 28 December 2019, Semple scored the opening goal in the fourth minute at Somerset Park versus the Honest Men, as Queens won 2–1.

== Career statistics ==
As of 11 March 2020

Appearances and goals by club, season and competition
Club	Season	League			National Cup		League Cup		Other		Total	
Club	Season	Division	Apps	Goals	Apps	Goals	Apps	Goals	Apps	Goals	Apps	Goals
Sheffield United	2018–19	EFL Championship	0	0	0	0	0	0	0	0	0	0
Queen of the South (loan)	2018–19	Scottish Championship	18	1	1	0	5	0	3 (Note: Appearances in the Scottish Challenge Cup)	0	27	1
Ross County	2018-19	Scottish Championship	4	0	0	0	0	0	0	0	4	0
Queen of the South	2019-20	Scottish Championship	11	2	0	0	1	1	0	0	12	3
Career total			33	3	1	0	6	1	3	0	43	4

== Honours ==
Ross County

- Scottish Championship: 2018–19
