= Mark Hurst (footballer, born 1995) =

Scottish footballer (born 1995)

Personal information
- Full name: Mark Hurst
- Date of birth: 21 October 1995 (age 31)
- Place of birth: Edinburgh, Scotland
- Position: Goalkeeper

Youth career
- Tynecastle
- 2011-2013: Livingston
- 2013-2015: St Johnstone

Senior career*
Years	Team	Apps	(Gls)
2015-2019	St Johnstone	0	(0)
2015-2016	→ Elgin City (loan)	35	(0)
2016-2017	→ East Fife (loan)	24	(0)
2017-2018	→ East Fife (loan)	14	(0)

International career
2014	Scotland U19	1	(0)
- * Club domestic league appearances and goals

Mark Hurst (born 21 October 1995) is a Scottish former footballer who played as a goalkeeper for East Fife and Livingston.

== Career ==
=== Tynecastle and Livingston ===
Hurst began his career in the Tynecastle youth academy before leaving to join Livingston in 2011.

=== St Johnstone and loan spells ===
He transferred to St Johnstone's youth academy in 2013 and signed a professional deal with the club in 2015. Later that year, Hurst went out on loan to Elgin City in search of playing time. He made 35 appearances for the Black and Whites before returning to his parent club.

The following season, Hurst went out on loan again. This time he headed to East Fife where he made 24 appearances for the Fifers.

Hurst returned to Bayview Stadium the following season for another loan spell, this time turning out 14 times for East Fife.

In 2019, Hurst decided to leave St Johnstone, much to his manager Tommy Wright's surprise and disappointment. It is believed Hurst left the club to move to USA to be with his girlfriend.

== International career ==
Hurst made one appearance for Scotland U19, coming on as a 70th-minute substitute for Ross Stewart in a 4–2 win over Switzerland on 5 March 2014 at the Almondvale Stadium.
