= Milan Nitrianský =

Czech footballer

Personal information
- Date of birth: 13 December 1990 (age 35)
- Place of birth: Prachatice, Czechoslovakia
- Height: 1.90 m (6 ft 3 in)
- Position: Right back

Team information
- Current team: Slavoj Vyšehrad
- Number: 23

Senior career*
Years	Team	Apps	(Gls)
2009–2011	České Budějovice	20	(2)
2009–2010	→ Čáslav (loan)	15	(0)
2011–2015	Slavia Prague	82	(4)
2015	→ Příbram (loan)	12	(1)
2015–2016	Avellino	9	(1)
2016–2017	Slovan Liberec	7	(0)
2017	Bohemians 1905	4	(0)
2017–2018	Partick Thistle	7	(0)
2018	České Budějovice	14	(1)
2018–2019	1. FK Příbram	21	(1)
2019–	Slavoj Vyšehrad	9	(3)

International career
2007–2008	Czech Republic U18	10	(1)
2008–2009	Czech Republic U19	11	(0)
2011	Czech Republic U20	1	(0)
2011–2012	Czech Republic U21	7	(1)
- * Club domestic league appearances and goals as of 21:34, 18 February 2020 (UTC)

Milan Nitrianský (born 13 December 1990) is a Czech professional footballer who plays for FC Slavoj Vyšehrad. He has also represented his country at youth level.

== Club career ==
Nitrianský has previously played for several clubs in the Czech league, including Slavia Prague, and Italian club Avellino with which he signed a three-year contract. The first match took place on 9 August against Casertana F.C. during the 2015–16 Coppa Italia at the Palermo stadium. On 15 August he disputed the last match against the S.S.D. Palermo which was won 2–0 by Avellino. On 2 March 2016 he decided to consensually resolve the contract with the club.

In July 2016 Nitriansky signed a contract with FC Slovan Liberec that played in the Czech First League. On 28 July he disputed its first match with the new team, replacing Daniel Bartl at the 78th minute of the Europa League winning match against the Austrian Admira Wacker Mödling. In January 2017 he moved to the Bohemians 1905 with which he made a first appearance on 15 March against Viktoria Plzeň.

He signed for Scottish Premiership club Partick Thistle on a one-year deal in August 2017. Nitriansky was released by Thistle on 31 January 2018, after making 7 appearances for the Jags.

== International career ==
Nitrianský has represented the Czech Republic at youth level. He scored his first international goal at U-18 level in a 2–2 draw against Turkey in 2008. He participated in the 2013 UEFA European Under-21 Championship qualification campaign, scoring in an 8–0 win over Andorra.

== Career statistics ==
As of match played 14 October 2017

Appearances and goals by club, season and competition
Club	Season	League			National Cup		League Cup		Other		Total	
Club	Season	Division	Apps	Goals	Apps	Goals	Apps	Goals	Apps	Goals	Apps	Goals
České Budějovice	2008–09	Czech First League	4	0	0	0	~	~	0	0	4	0
České Budějovice	2010–11	Czech First League	13	2	0	0	~	~	0	0	13	2
České Budějovice	2011–12	Czech First League	3	0	0	0	~	~	0	0	3	0
České Budějovice	Total		20	2	0	0	~	~	0	0	20	2
Čáslav (loan)	2009–10	Druhá Liga	16	0	0	0	~	~	0	0	16	0
Slavia Prague	2011–12	Czech First League	25	0	0	0	~	~	0	0	25	0
Slavia Prague	2012–13	Czech First League	25	4	0	0	~	~	0	0	25	4
Slavia Prague	2013–14	Czech First League	23	0	4	0	~	~	0	0	27	0
Slavia Prague	2014–15	Czech First League	9	0	0	0	~	~	0	0	9	0
Slavia Prague	Total		82	4	4	0	~	~	0	0	86	4
Příbram (loan)	2014–15	Czech First League	12	0	0	0	~	~	0	0	12	0
Avellino	2015–16	Serie B	9	1	2	0	~	~	~	~	11	1
Slovan Liberec	2016–17	Czech First League	7	0	1	0	~	~	3 (Note: Appearances in the Europa League)	0	11	0
Bohemians 1905	2016–17	Czech First League	3	0	1	0	~	~	0	0	4	0
Partick Thistle	2017–18	Scottish Premiership	7	0	0	0	0	0	~	~	7	0
Career total			156	7	8	0	0	0	3	0	167	7
