= 2019–20 Queen of the South F.C. season =

Queen of the South
2019–20 season
- Chairman: Billy Hewitson
- Manager: Allan Johnston
- Stadium: Palmerston Park
- Scottish Championship: 9th
- Scottish Cup: Third round
- League Cup: Group stages
- Challenge Cup: Third round
- Top goalscorer: League: Stephen Dobbie (8); All: Stephen Dobbie (11)
- Highest home attendance: 2,041 vs. Dundee United, 4 January 2020
- Lowest home attendance: 1,094 vs. Arbroath, 21 December 2019
- Average home league attendance: 1,396
Home colours	Away colours	Third colours

The 2019–20 season was Queen of the South's seventh consecutive season back in the second tier of Scottish football and their seventh season in the Scottish Championship, having been promoted as champions from the Scottish Second Division at the end of the 2012–13 season. Queens also competed in the Scottish Cup, the League Cup, and the Challenge Cup.

== Summary ==
Queens finished ninth in the Scottish Championship, although there were no play-offs due to the COVID-19 pandemic. Queens retained their place in the Championship after the leagues were ended by utilising a points-per-game ratio to determine the final league standings.

Queens reached the third round of the Challenge Cup, losing 3–2 away to Clyde.

The Doonhamers were knocked out after the first round of the League Cup after the completion of fixtures in Group E that included Annan Athletic, Dumbarton, Greenock Morton and Motherwell.

Queens reached the third round of the Scottish Cup, losing 2–1 to Queen's Park at Palmerston.

On 13 March 2020, all SPFL leagues were indefinitely suspended due to the COVID-19 pandemic.

On 8 April 2020, the SPFL proposed to end the 2019–20 season by utilising a points-per-game ratio to determine the final league standings.

On 15 April 2020, the plan was approved, with this declaration that the season was concluded, as Dundee United were declared title winners, with Partick Thistle relegated to League One.

== Results & fixtures ==
Win Draw Loss Abandoned or Postponed

=== Preseason ===
29 June 2019 Friendly	Airdrieonians	1–2	Queen of the South	Excelsior Stadium
14:00	Fordyce	QOSFC Report	Dobbie	Attendance: Closed doors

2 July 2019 Friendly	East Fife	1–2	Queen of the South	Bayview Stadium
19:45	Dowds 60'	QOSFC Report	Dobbie 18'; Mercer 26'	Attendance: 350; Referee: Dallas

6 July 2019 Friendly	Queen of the South	3–1	Clyde	Palmerston Park
14:00	Pybus; Oliver; Dobbie	QOSFC Report	Syvertsen	Attendance: Closed doors

=== Scottish Championship ===
3 August 2019 Match 1	Arbroath	0–0	Queen of the South	Gayfield Park
15:00		QOSFC Report; BBC Sport Report; Red Lichties Photos		Attendance: 1,100; Referee: Ross; Man of the Match: Pybus

10 August 2019 Match 2	Queen of the South	1–1	Dunfermline Athletic	Palmerston Park
15:00	Oliver 62'	QOSFC Report; BBC Sport Report; Pars Photos	Turner 8'	Attendance: 1,562; Referee: Reid; Man of the Match: Holt

24 August 2019 Match 3	Ayr United	1–0	Queen of the South	Somerset Park
15:00	Kelly 26'	QOSFC Report; BBC Sport Report; Honest Men Photos		Attendance: 2,005; Referee: Kirkland; Man of the Match: Murray

31 August 2019 Match 4	Queen of the South	0–1	Alloa Athletic	Palmerston Park
15:00		QOSFC Report; BBC Sport Report; Wasps Photos	Trouten 58'	Attendance: 1,294; Referee: Duncan; Man of the Match: Holt

14 September 2019 Match 5	Queen of the South	1–0	Greenock Morton	Palmerston Park
15:00	El Bakhtaoui 16'	QOSFC Report; BBC Sport Report; Ton Photos		Attendance: 1,302; Referee: Beaton; Man of the Match: McCrorie

21 September 2019 Match 6	Inverness Caledonian Thistle	2–0	Queen of the South	Caledonian Stadium
15:00	Welsh 15'; Walsh 19'	QOSFC Report; BBC Sport Report; Caley Jags Photos		Attendance: 1,760; Referee: Newlands; Man of the Match: McCrorie

27 September 2019 Match 7	Queen of the South	1–1	Dundee	Palmerston Park
19:05	Hamilton 6'	QOSFC Report; BBC Sport Report; Dee Photos	McGhee 11'	Attendance: 1,249; Referee: Collum; Man of the Match: McCrorie

5 October 2019 Match 8	Partick Thistle	0–1	Queen of the South	Firhill Stadium
15:00		QOSFC Report; BBC Sport Report; Harry Wraggs Photos	Brownlie 60'	Attendance: 2,910; Referee: Dallas; Man of the Match: Brownlie

19 October 2019 Match 9	Queen of the South	4–0	Dundee United	Palmerston Park
15:00	Dobbie 18', 70'; Holt 28'; Paton 77'	QOSFC Report; BBC Sport Report; Terrors Photos		Attendance: 1,909; Referee: Duncan; Man of the Match: El Bakhtaoui

26 October 2019 Match 10	Alloa Athletic	2–2	Queen of the South	Indodrill Stadium
15:00	Trouten 64'; O'Hara 65'	QOSFC Report; BBC Sport Report; Wasps Photos	Dobbie 35'; Hamilton 36'	Attendance: 875; Referee: Lowe; Man of the Match: Pybus

29 October 2019 Match 11	Queen of the South	0–2	Inverness Caledonian Thistle	Palmerston Park
19:45		QOSFC Report; BBC Sport Report; Caley Jags Photos	Doran 30'; Todorov 90+3'	Attendance: 1,221; Referee: Kirkland; Man of the Match: Kilday

2 November 2019 Match 12	Dunfermline Athletic	2–0	Queen of the South	East End Park
15:00	Dow 57'; Nisbet 82'	QOSFC Report; BBC Sport Report; Pars Photos		Attendance: 3,621; Referee: Dallas; Man of the Match: McCrorie

9 November 2019 Match 13	Queen of the South	3–1	Ayr United	Palmerston Park
15:00	Holt 18'; Murray 67'; Oliver 74'	QOSFC Report; BBC Sport Report; Honest Men Photos	Moffat 38'; McCowan (red card) 78'	Attendance: 1,850; Referee: D Robertson; Man of the Match: Dobbie

16 November 2019 Match 14	Dundee United	3–0	Queen of the South	Tannadice Park
15:00	McMullan 22'; Clark 45+1'; Stanton 49'	QOSFC Report; BBC Sport Report; Terrors Photos		Attendance: 7,675; Referee: Collum; Man of the Match: Holt

30 November 2019 Match 15	Dundee	1–2	Queen of the South	Dens Park
15:00	Johnson 90+2'	QOSFC Report; BBC Sport Report; Dee Photos	Dobbie 29', 90+3'	Attendance: 4,517; Referee: Muir; Man of the Match: Dobbie

7 December 2019 Match 16	Queen of the South	1–2	Partick Thistle	Palmerston Park
15:00	Murray 20'	QOSFC Report; BBC Sport Report; Harry Wraggs Photos	Cardle 70'; Cole 85'	Attendance: 1,314; Referee: McLean; Man of the Match: Brownlie

14 December 2019	Greenock Morton	P–P	Queen of the South	Cappielow Park
15:00		BBC Sport
Note: Postponed due to waterlogged pitch

21 December 2019 Match 17	Queen of the South	2–0	Arbroath	Palmerston Park
15:00	Pybus 33'; Little 87' (o.g.)	QOSFC Report; BBC Sport Report; Red Lichties Photos		Attendance: 1,094; Referee: Irvine; Man of the Match: Dobbie

28 December 2019 Match 18	Ayr United	1–2	Queen of the South	Somerset Park
15:00	Muirhead 77' (pen.)	QOSFC Report; BBC Sport Report; Honest Men Photos	Semple 4'; Dobbie 58' (pen.)	Attendance: 2,062; Referee: Lowe; Man of the Match: Pybus

4 January 2020 Match 19	Queen of the South	0–1	Dundee United	Palmerston Park
15:00		QOSFC Report; BBC Sport Report; Terrors Photos	Connolly 48'	Attendance: 2,041; Referee: Steven; Man of the Match: Holt

11 January 2020	Inverness Caledonian Thistle	P–P	Queen of the South	Caledonian Stadium
15:00		QOSFC News
Note: Postponed due to waterlogged pitch

25 January 2020 Match 20	Queen of the South	2–3	Alloa Athletic	Palmerston Park
15:00	Hamilton 52'; Dobbie 58'	QOSFC Report; BBC Sport Report; Wasps Photos	O'Hara 8', 81'; Thomson 14'	Attendance: 1,169; Referee: Duncan; Man of the Match: Lyon

1 February 2020 Match 21	Queen of the South	2–3	Dunfermline Athletic	Palmerston Park
15:00	Oliver 10'; Dobbie 59' (pen.)	QOSFC Report; BBC Sport Report; Pars Photos	McGill 14'; Devine 45'; Ashcroft 82'	Attendance: 1,302; Referee: Napier; Man of the Match: Lyon

8 February 2020 Match 22	Greenock Morton	2–2	Queen of the South	Cappielow Park
15:00	McHugh 59' (pen.); Nesbitt 76'	QOSFC Report; BBC Sport Report; Ton Photos	Petravicius 18'; Hamilton 73'	Attendance: 1,380; Referee: Collum; Man of the Match: Wilson

15 February 2020 Match 23	Arbroath	2–0	Queen of the South	Gayfield Park
15:00	Gold 6'; Hilson 35'	QOSFC Report; BBC Sport Report; Red Lichties Photos		Attendance: 801; Referee: Reid; Man of the Match: Petravicius

22 February 2020 Match 24	Queen of the South	0–1	Dundee	Palmerston Park
15:00		QOSFC Report; BBC Sport Report; Dee Photos	Forster 72'	Attendance: 1,126; Referee: D Robertson; Man of the Match: Semple

29 February 2020 Match 25	Queen of the South	0–4	Greenock Morton	Palmerston Park
15:00		QOSFC Report; BBC Sport Report; Ton Photos	Tumilty 25'; Nesbitt 44'; Cadden 77'; McGuffie 88'	Attendance: 1,116; Referee: Anderson; Man of the Match: Hamilton

3 March 2020 Match 26	Partick Thistle	0–0	Queen of the South	Firhill Stadium
19:45		QOSFC Report; BBC Sport Report; Harry Wraggs Photos		Attendance: 2,122; Referee: Lowe; Man of the Match: Wilson

7 March 2020 Match 27	Dunfermline Athletic	1–1	Queen of the South	East End Park
15:00	Afolabi 46' (pen.)	QOSFC Report; BBC Sport Report; Pars Photos	Oliver 3'	Attendance: 3,597; Referee: Aitken; Man of the Match: Oliver

10 March 2020 Match 28	Inverness Caledonian Thistle	3–1	Queen of the South	Caledonian Stadium
19:45	Vincent 30'; Keatings 57'; Storey 79'	QOSFC Report; BBC Sport Report; Caley Jags Photos	Semple 72'	Attendance: 1,811; Referee: Reid; Man of the Match: Semple

=== Scottish League Cup ===
13 July 2019 Round 1;Group E-1	Queen of the South	0–3	Motherwell	Palmerston Park
15:00		QOSFC Report; BBC Sport Report; Well Photos	Donnelly 71' (pen.); Seedorf 90+1'; Hylton 90+2'	Attendance: 1,956; Referee: D Robertson; Man of the Match: Brownlie

16 July 2019 Round 1;Group E-2	Queen of the South	3–3 (5–4 p)	Annan Athletic	Palmerston Park
19:45	Murray 23'; Mercer 26'; Dobbie 42'	QOSFC Report; BBC Sport Report; Galabankies Photos	Douglas 34'; McLear 54'; Wooding-Holt 81'	Attendance: 1,115; Referee: Muir; Man of the Match: McCrorie
	Penalties
	Dobbie (penalty scored); Oliver (penalty scored); Murray (penalty scored); Holt (penalty scored); Kidd (penalty scored)		McLean (penalty scored); Muir (penalty scored); Bradley (penalty scored); Nade (penalty scored); Sonkur (penalty missed)

20 July 2019 Round 1;Group E-3	Dumbarton	1–4	Queen of the South	The C&G Systems Stadium
15:00	Crossan 8'	QOSFC Report; BBC Sport Report; Sons Photos	Paton 10'; Oliver 13'; Dobbie 17'; Murray 22'	Attendance: 580; Referee: Duncan; Man of the Match: Murray

27 July 2019 Round 1;Group E-4	Greenock Morton	3–3 (4–3 p)	Queen of the South	Cappielow Park
15:00	Sutton 31'; Cadden 45' (pen.); McHugh 56'	QOSFC Report; BBC Sport Report; Ton Photos	Kilday 4'; McAlister 62' (o.g.); Semple 78'	Attendance: 1,388; Referee: Kirkland; Man of the Match: Holt
	Penalties
	Nesbitt (penalty scored); Jacobs (penalty scored); Sutton (penalty missed); Tumilty (penalty scored); Cadden (penalty scored)		Mercer (penalty scored); Oliver (penalty missed); Murray (penalty scored); Holt (penalty scored); Kidd (penalty missed)

=== Scottish Challenge Cup ===
7 September 2019 Round 3	Clyde	3–2	Queen of the South	Broadwood Stadium
15:00	McStay 62'; Goodwillie 76' (pen.); McNiff 78'	QOSFC Report; SPFL Report; Bully Wee Photos	Murray 4'; Dobbie 47' (pen.)	Attendance: 667; Referee: Steven; Man of the Match: Murray

=== Scottish Cup ===
23 November 2019 Round 3	Queen of the South	1–2	Queen's Park	Palmerston Park
15:00	Murray 90+2'	QOSFC Report; BBC Sport Report; Spiders Photos	Kouider-Aissa 15', 30'	Attendance: 1,066; Referee: Dickinson; Man of the Match: Murray

== Player statistics ==
=== Captains ===
No.	P	Name	Country	No. games	Notes
11	FW	Stephen Dobbie	(Scotland)	30	Club Captain
5	DF	Darren Brownlie	(Scotland)	3	Vice Captain
3	DF	Kevin Holt	(Scotland)	1	Vice Captain

Last updated: 10 March 2020
Source: Competitive match reports.
Competitive matches only
Matches started as captain only
Country: FIFA nationality; No.: Squad number; P: Position; Name: Player name; No. Games: Number of games started as captain.

=== Squad ===
As of 10 March 2020

No.	Pos	Nat	Player	Total		Scottish Championship		Challenge Cup		League Cup		Scottish Cup	
No.	Pos	Nat	Player	Apps	Goals	Apps	Goals	Apps	Goals	Apps	Goals	Apps	Goals
*1	GK	(Scotland) SCO	Robby McCrorie	24	0	19+0	0	0+0	0	4+0	0	1+0	0
1	GK	(Scotland) SCO	Ross Stewart	9	0	9+0	0	0+0	0	0+0	0	0+0	0
2	DF	(Scotland) SCO	Scott Mercer	28	1	23+0	0	1+0	0	3+0	1	1+0	0
3	DF	(Scotland) SCO	Kevin Holt	33	2	27+0	2	1+0	0	4+0	0	1+0	0
4	DF	(Scotland) SCO	Lee Kilday	30	1	25+0	0	1+0	0	4+0	1	0+0	0
*5	DF	(Scotland) SCO	Darren Brownlie	23	1	18+0	1	1+0	0	3+0	0	1+0	0
5	DF	(England) ENG	Michael Ledger	5	0	5+0	0	0+0	0	0+0	0	0+0	0
6	MF	(England) ENG	Dan Pybus	32	1	26+0	1	1+0	0	3+1	0	1+0	0
7	FW	(Scotland) SCO	Connor Murray	25	6	15+4	2	1+0	1	4+0	2	1+0	1
8	DF	(Scotland) SCO	Lewis Kidd	25	0	15+5	0	0+0	0	4+0	0	1+0	0
9	FW	(Scotland) SCO	Jack Hamilton	27	4	11+11	4	0+1	0	2+2	0	0+0	0
10	FW	(Scotland) SCO	Gary Oliver	24	5	13+7	4	0+0	0	3+0	1	1+0	0
11	FW	(Scotland) SCO	Stephen Dobbie	30	11	25+0	8	1+0	1	3+0	2	1+0	0
*14	MF	(Scotland) SCO	Andrew McCarthy	9	0	0+4	0	0+0	0	3+1	0	1+0	0
14	DF	(Scotland) SCO	David Devine	5	0	5+0	0	0+0	0	0+0	0	0+0	0
15	MF	(Scotland) SCO	Darren Lyon	23	0	16+5	0	1+0	0	0+0	0	1+0	0
17	MF	(Ghana) GHA	Abdul Osman	11	0	9+2	0	0+0	0	0+0	0	0+0	0
18	DF	(England) ENG	Callum Semple	12	3	9+2	2	0+0	0	1+0	1	0+0	0
*19	FW	(France) FRA	Faissal El Bakhtaoui	16	1	15+0	1	1+0	0	0+0	0	0+0	0
19	FW	(Lithuania) LTU	Deimantas Petravicius	7	1	3+4	1	0+0	0	0+0	0	0+0	0
20	GK	(Scotland) SCO	Jack Leighfield	1	0	0+0	0	1+0	0	0+0	0	0+0	0
21	FW	(Scotland) SCO	Ross Irving	5	0	0+3	0	0+0	0	0+2	0	0+0	0
22	DF	(Scotland) SCO	Ewan Gourlay	1	0	0+0	0	0+0	0	0+1	0	0+0	0
*23	MF	(Scotland) SCO	Daniel Irving	0	0	0+0	0	0+0	0	0+0	0	0+0	0
23	MF	(Scotland) SCO	Iain Wilson	8	0	8+0	0	0+0	0	0+0	0	0+0	0
24	MF	(England) ENG	Callum Williams	0	0	0+0	0	0+0	0	0+0	0	0+0	0
25	MF	(Scotland) SCO	Michael Paton	27	2	12+10	1	1+0	0	3+0	1	0+1	0
26	DF	(France) FRA	Benjamin Luissint	0	0	0+0	0	0+0	0	0+0	0	0+0	0
29	FW	(England) ENG	Michael Williamson	0	0	0+0	0	0+0	0	0+0	0	0+0	0
30	GK	(Scotland) SCO	Craig Burns	0	0	0+0	0	0+0	0	0+0	0	0+0	0

=== Disciplinary record ===
As of 10 March 2020 (UTC)

Number	Nation	Position	Name	Scottish Championship		Challenge Cup		League Cup		Scottish Cup		Total	
Number	Nation	Position	Name	Yellow card	Red card	Yellow card	Red card	Yellow card	Red card	Yellow card	Red card	Yellow card	Red card
1	(Scotland)	GK	Ross Stewart	1	0	0	0	0	0	0	0	1	0
2	(Scotland)	DF	Scott Mercer	4	0	0	0	0	0	0	0	4	0
3	(Scotland)	DF	Kevin Holt	4	0	0	0	1	0	0	0	5	0
*5	(Scotland)	DF	Darren Brownlie	0	0	1	0	2	0	0	0	3	0
5	(England)	DF	Michael Ledger	2	0	0	0	0	0	0	0	2	0
6	(England)	MF	Dan Pybus	9	0	0	0	1	0	0	0	10	0
7	(Scotland)	FW	Connor Murray	2	0	0	0	0	0	0	0	2	0
8	(Scotland)	DF	Lewis Kidd	3	0	0	0	0	0	1	0	4	0
11	(Scotland)	FW	Stephen Dobbie	3	0	1	0	0	0	0	0	4	0
*14	(Scotland)	MF	Andrew McCarthy	1	0	0	0	0	0	0	0	1	0
14	(Scotland)	DF	David Devine	1	0	0	0	0	0	0	0	1	0
17	(Ghana)	MF	Abdul Osman	2	0	0	0	0	0	0	0	2	0
18	(England)	DF	Callum Semple	1	0	0	0	0	0	0	0	1	0
19	(France)	FW	Faissal El Bakhtaoui	4	0	0	0	0	0	0	0	4	0
23	(Scotland)	MF	Iain Wilson	1	0	0	0	0	0	0	0	1	0
25	(Scotland)	MF	Michael Paton	3	0	0	0	0	0	0	0	3	0
Totals				41	0	2	0	4	0	1	0	48	0

=== Top scorers ===
Last updated 10 March 2020

Position	Nation	Name	Scottish Championship	Challenge Cup	League Cup	Scottish Cup	Total
1	(Scotland)	Stephen Dobbie	8	1	2	0	11
2	(Scotland)	Connor Murray	2	1	2	1	6
3	(Scotland)	Gary Oliver	4	0	1	0	5
4	(Scotland)	Jack Hamilton	4	0	0	0	4
5	(England)	Callum Semple	2	0	1	0	3
6	(Scotland)	Kevin Holt	2	0	0	0	2
=	(Scotland)	Michael Paton	1	0	1	0	2
8	(Scotland)	Darren Brownlie	1	0	0	0	1
=	(France)	Faissal El Bakhtaoui	1	0	0	0	1
=	(Scotland)	Lee Kilday	0	0	1	0	1
=	(Scotland)	Scott Mercer	0	0	1	0	1
=	(Lithuania)	Deimantas Petravicius	1	0	0	0	1
=	(England)	Dan Pybus	1	0	0	0	1

=== Clean sheets ===
R	Pos	Nat	Name	Scottish Championship	Challenge Cup	League Cup	Scottish Cup	Total
*1	GK	(Scotland)	Robby McCrorie	5	0	0	0	5
1	GK	(Scotland)	Ross Stewart	1	0	0	0	1
20	GK	(Scotland)	Jack Leighfield	0	0	0	0	0
			Totals	6	0	0	0	6

Last updated: 10 March 2020
Source: Match reports in Competitive matches

== Team statistics ==
=== League table ===
Pos	Team	Pld	W	D	L	GF	GA	GD	Pts	PPG	Promotion, qualification or relegation (Note: All play-off matches were cancelled, as clubs voted to curtail the season due to the COVID-19 pandemic in Scotland.)
6	Dunfermline Athletic	28	10	7	11	41	36	+5	37	1.32	
7	Greenock Morton	28	10	6	12	45	52	−7	36	1.29	
8	Alloa Athletic	28	7	10	11	33	43	−10	31	1.11	
9	Queen of the South	28	7	7	14	28	40	−12	28	1.00	
10	Partick Thistle (R)	27	6	8	13	32	47	−15	26	0.96	Relegation to League One

Source: SPFL
Rules for classification: 1) Points per game.
(R) Relegated

=== League Cup table ===
Pos	Team	Pld	W	PW	PL	L	GF	GA	GD	Pts	Qualification	MOT	GMO	QOS	DUM	ANN
1	Motherwell	4	4	0	0	0	13	0	+13	12	Qualification for the Second Round	—	4–0	—	—	4–0
2	Greenock Morton	4	2	1	0	1	14	8	+6	8	Qualification for the Second Round	—	—	p3–3	6–1	—
3	Queen of the South	4	1	1	1	1	10	10	0	6		0–3	—	—	—	p3–3
4	Dumbarton	4	1	0	0	3	3	12	−9	3		0–2	—	1–4	—	—
5	Annan Athletic	4	0	0	1	3	3	13	−10	1		—	0–5	—	0–1	—

Rules for classification: 1) goal difference, 2) goals scored, 3) away goals scored, 4) matches won, 5) away matches won, 6) drawing of lots.

=== Division summary ===
Round	1	2	3	4	5	6	7	8	9	10	11	12	13	14	15	16	17	18	19	20	21	22	23	24	25	26	27	28
Ground	A	H	A	H	H	A	H	A	H	A	H	A	H	A	A	H	H	A	H	H	H	A	A	H	H	A	A	A
Result	D	D	L	L	W	L	D	W	W	D	L	L	W	L	W	L	W	W	L	L	L	D	L	L	L	D	D	L
Position	8	7	7	8	7	8	8	6	4	6	7	7	7	7	7	7	6	6	6	8	8	8	8	9	9	9	9	9

Updated to match(es) played on 1 June 2020. Source:
A = Away; H = Home; W = Win; D = Draw; L = Loss

=== Management statistics ===
Last updated 10 March 2020

Name	From	To	P	W	D	L	Win% (Note: Win% is the percentage of matches won rounded to two decimal places.)
Allan Johnston	13 July 2019	10 March 2020	34	8	9	17	23.53

== Transfers ==
=== Players in ===
Player	From	Fee
(Scotland) Kevin Holt	(Cyprus) Pafos	Free
(Scotland) Gary Oliver	(Scotland) Greenock Morton	Free
(England) Callum Semple	(Scotland) Ross County	Free
(Scotland) Lewis Kidd	(Scotland) Falkirk	Free
(Scotland) Jack Hamilton	(Scotland) Livingston	Loan
(Scotland) Lee Kilday	(Scotland) Greenock Morton	Free
(Scotland) Robby McCrorie	(Scotland) Rangers	Loan
(England) Dan Pybus	(Norway) Tonsberg	Free
(Scotland) Andrew McCarthy	(Scotland) Partick Thistle	Free
(Scotland) Michael Paton	(Scotland) Dumbarton	Free
(France) Faissal El Bakhtaoui	(Scotland) Dundee	Free
(Scotland) Darren Lyon	(England) Peterborough United	Free
(Ghana) Abdul Osman	(Scotland) Falkirk	Free
(Scotland) Ross Stewart	(Scotland) Livingston	Loan
(Scotland) David Devine	(Scotland) Motherwell	Loan
(Lithuania) Deimantas Petravicius	(Kazakhstan) Okzhetpes	Free
(Scotland) Iain Wilson	(Scotland) Kilmarnock	Loan
(England) Michael Ledger	(Norway) Notodden	Free

=== Players out ===
Player	To	Fee
(Scotland) Callum Fordyce	(Scotland) Airdrieonians	Free
(South Africa) Kyle Jacobs	(Scotland) Greenock Morton	Free
(England) Josh Todd (footballer)	(Scotland) Dundee	Free
(Scotland) Nicky Low	(Scotland) East Stirlingshire	Free
(Australia) Lyndon Dykes	(Scotland) Livingston	Free
(England) Jordan Marshall	(Scotland) Dundee	Free
(Scotland) Andy Stirling	(Scotland) Alloa Athletic	Free
(Scotland) Michael Doyle	(Scotland) Falkirk	Free
(Scotland) Alan Martin	(Scotland) East Kilbride	Free
(Turkey) Deniz Mehmet	(Scotland) Dundee United	Free
(Scotland) Daniel Irving	Free Agent	Free
(France) Benjamin Luissint	(Scotland) Gretna 2008	Loan
(Scotland) Andrew McCarthy	(Scotland) Peterhead	Free
(France) Faissal El Bakhtaoui	(Morocco) Difaa El Jadidi	Undisclosed
(England) Michael Williamson	(Scotland) Gretna 2008	Loan
(Scotland) Robby McCrorie	(Scotland) Livingston	Loan
(Scotland) Darren Brownlie	(Scotland) Partick Thistle	Undisclosed
(France) Benjamin Luissint	(Scotland) Gretna 2008	Loan

== See also ==
- List of Queen of the South F.C. seasons
