= Petravičius =

Petravičius (masculine), Petravičienė (surname by husband), Petravičiūtė (maiden name) is a Lithuanian-language surname. Notable people with this surname include:

- Deimantas Petravičius (born 1995), Lithuanian footballer
- Marijonas Petravičius (born 1979), Lithuanian basketball player
