= Robby McCrorie =

Scottish footballer (born 1998)

Personal information
- Full name: Robby McCrorie
- Date of birth: 18 March 1998 (age 28)
- Place of birth: Dailly, Scotland
- Height: 1.93 m (6 ft 4 in)
- Position: Goalkeeper

Team information
- Current team: Varaždin
- Number: 1

Youth career
- 2013–2017: Rangers

Senior career*
Years	Team	Apps	(Gls)
2015–2024	Rangers	5	(0)
2017–2018	→ Berwick Rangers (loan)	33	(0)
2018–2019	→ Greenock Morton (loan)	15	(0)
2019–2020	→ Queen of the South (loan)	19	(0)
2020	→ Livingston (loan)	8	(0)
2020–2021	→ Livingston (loan)	16	(0)
2024–2026	Kilmarnock	21	(0)
2025–2026	→ Esbjerg fB (loan)	25	(0)
2026–	Varaždin	1	(0)

International career
2012	Scotland U15	3	(0)
2012–2013	Scotland U16	9	(0)
2013–2015	Scotland U17	17	(0)
2015–2017	Scotland U19	9	(0)
2018	Scotland U20	1	(0)
2018–2020	Scotland U21	7	(0)
- * Club domestic league appearances and goals as of 2 June 2026

Robby McCrorie (born 18 March 1998) is a Scottish professional footballer who plays as a goalkeeper who plays for Croatian Football League club Varaždin.

McCrorie previously had loan spells with Berwick Rangers, Greenock Morton, Queen of the South, Livingston and Esbjerg fB.

== Club career ==
From the village of Dailly in South Ayrshire, McCrorie was scouted by Rangers, the team his family supported, at a young age and started training with the Govan club at the age of fourteen.

On 17 June 2017, after being involved in match-day squads over the previous two seasons without making an appearance, McCrorie was loaned out to Berwick Rangers. In December 2017, McCrorie signed a contract extension with the Light Blues until May 2022. Despite the Wee Gers finishing third last in the league, McCrorie played a major role that season, winning the club's player of the year award.

On 25 January 2019, McCrorie was loaned to Greenock Morton, alongside fellow Rangers youth player Andy Dallas until the end of the 2018–19 season.

On 4 July 2019, McCrorie went on loan to Queen of the South on a deal that was due to run for the whole of the 2019–20 season but he was recalled by Rangers during January 2020. McCrorie was then loaned out to Scottish Premiership club Livingston until 31 May 2020, making eight appearances for the club.

After signing a new contract at Rangers until 2023, McCrorie returned to Livingston on loan for the 2020–21 season on 9 July 2020.

After a first team debut in the UEFA Europa League against FC Alashkert, McCrorie made his first league start for Rangers against Old Firm rivals Celtic on 29 August 2021. McCrorie kept a clean sheet and made vital saves to help Rangers to a 1–0 victory.

In July 2024, McCrorie signed for Kilmarnock. On 29 August 2025, McCrorie joined Danish 1st Division side Esbjerg fB on a one-year loan deal with an option to buy.

On August 28th, 2026 he signed with NK Varaždin of the Croatian Football League. He made his debut in the second round of the Croatian Football Cup against NK Zagora Unešić and kept a clean sheet. In his second appearance, he made two stops in the penalty shootout to help NK Varazdin progress over NK Lokomotiva Zagreb into the quarter final of the cup.

== International career ==
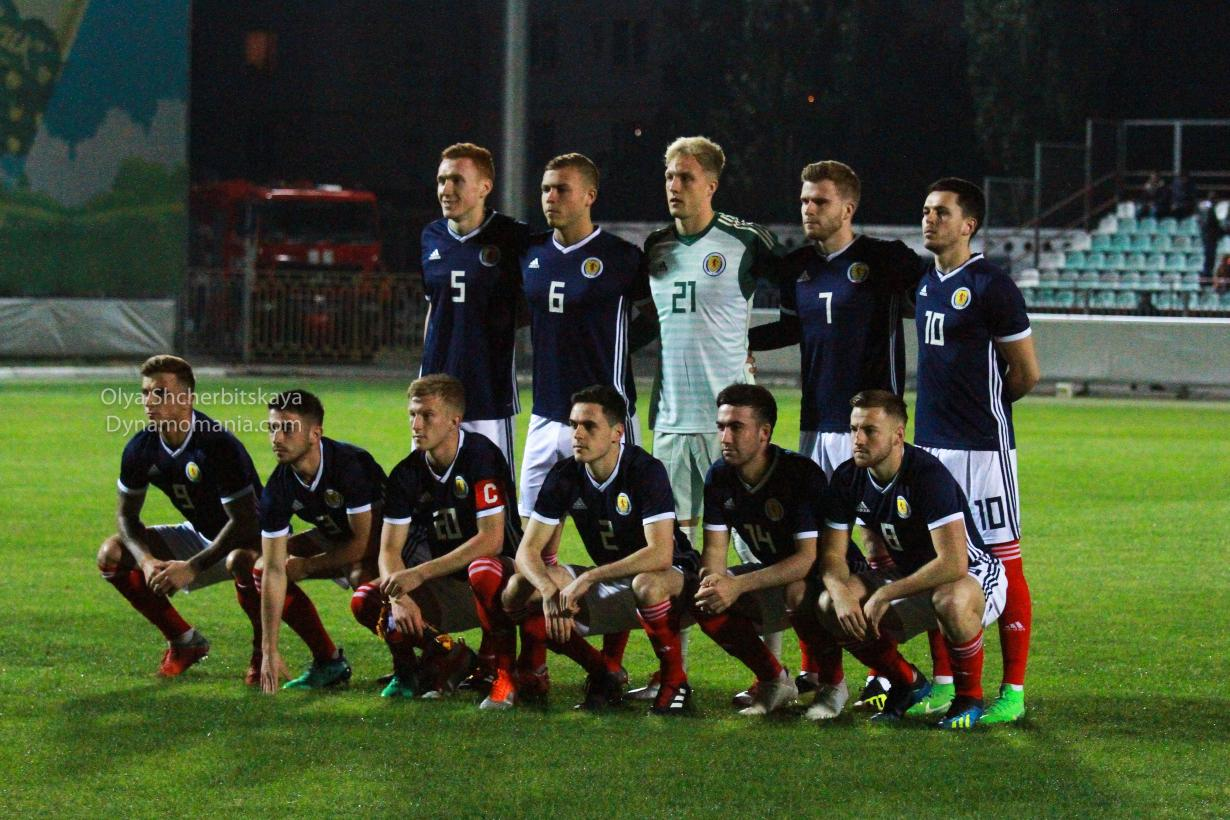
McCrorie (No 21, goalkeeper) with Scotland U21s in Ukraine, 2018, alongside twin brother Ross (No 20, captain)

McCrorie has represented Scotland at various youth levels.

He played for Scotland U16 in the Victory Shield in 2012–13 and 2013–14. With his brother Ross, Scotland won it in 2013–14. McCrorie was selected for the Scotland U17 team in the UEFA under-17 Championship in 2014, where the Netherlands beat in the semi-finals, and 2015, this time with his brother in the squad.

Chosen for the under-21 squad in the 2018 Toulon Tournament, the team lost to Turkey in a penalty-out and finished fourth. He was added to the senior squad for the first time in September 2020. In September 2022 he was booked for delaying the play during a 2022–23 UEFA Nations League match against Ukraine, while among the Scotland substitutes and still awaiting his debut for the national team.

== Personal life ==
Robby is the twin brother of Rangers player Ross McCrorie.

== Career statistics ==
As of match played 18 May 2025

Appearances and goals by club, season and competition
Club	Season	League			National cup		League cup		Other		Total	
Club	Season	Division	Apps	Goals	Apps	Goals	Apps	Goals	Apps	Goals	Apps	Goals
Rangers	2016–17	Scottish Premiership	0	0	0	0	0	0	—		0	0
Rangers	2017–18	Scottish Premiership	0	0	0	0	0	0	0	0	0	0
Rangers	2018–19	Scottish Premiership	0	0	0	0	0	0	0	0	0	0
Rangers	2019–20	Scottish Premiership	0	0	0	0	0	0	0	0	0	0
Rangers	2020–21	Scottish Premiership	0	0	0	0	0	0	0	0	0	0
Rangers	2021–22	Scottish Premiership	1	0	0	0	0	0	1 (Note: Appearance in the UEFA Europa League)	0	2	0
Rangers	2022–23	Scottish Premiership	4	0	0	0	0	0	0	0	4	0
Rangers	2023–24	Scottish Premiership	0	0	1	0	0	0	0	0	1	0
Rangers	Total		5	0	1	0	0	0	1	0	7	0
Rangers Under-20s	2016–17	—			—		—		2 (Note: Appearances in the Scottish Challenge Cup)	0	2	0
Berwick Rangers (loan)	2017–18	Scottish League Two	33	0	2	0	4	0	2	0	41	0
Rangers Under-20s	2018–19	—			—		—		1	0	1	0
Greenock Morton (loan)	2018–19	Scottish Championship	15	0	0	0	0	0	0	0	15	0
Queen of the South (loan)	2019–20	Scottish Championship	19	0	1	0	4	0	0	0	24	0
Livingston (loan)	2019–20	Scottish Premiership	8	0	0	0	0	0	—		8	0
Livingston (loan)	2020–21	Scottish Premiership	16	0	1	0	1	0	—		18	0
Kilmarnock	2024–25	Scottish Premiership	21	0	1	0	0	0	4	0	26	0
Career total			117	0	6	0	9	0	10	0	142	0

== Honours ==
Livingston

- Scottish League Cup runner-up: 2020–21

Rangers

- Scottish League Cup: 2023–24
- UEFA Europa League runner-up: 2021–22
