= Andrew McCarthy (footballer) =

Scottish footballer (born 1998)

Personal information
- Date of birth: 20 October 1998 (age 28)
- Place of birth: Bishopbriggs, Scotland
- Position: Defensive midfielder

Team information
- Current team: Peterhead
- Number: 8

Senior career*
Years	Team	Apps	(Gls)
2017–2019	Partick Thistle	27	(0)
2019–2020	Queen of the South	4	(0)
2020–	Peterhead	155	(5)
- * Club domestic league appearances and goals as of 4 May 2026

Andrew McCarthy (born 20 October 1998) is a Scottish footballer who plays for Scottish League One club Peterhead. McCarthy has previously played for Partick Thistle and Queen of the South.

McCarthy started his career with Partick Thistle and debuted in January 2017 in a 4–0 win versus Formartine United in the fourth round of the Scottish Cup. McCarthy started his first Scottish Premiership match in April 2017, in a 1–1 draw versus Celtic at Celtic Park. and was released by the Harry Wraggs at the end of the 2018-19 season.

On 12 July 2019, McCarthy signed a one-year deal with Dumfries club Queen of the South. On 9 January 2020, McCarthy was released early from his contract by Queens due to a lack of first-team football and then signed for Peterhead.

== Career statistics ==
As of match played 18 October 2025

Appearances and goals by club, season and competition
Club	Season	League			Scottish Cup		League Cup		Other		Total	
Club	Season	Division	Apps	Goals	Apps	Goals	Apps	Goals	Apps	Goals	Apps	Goals
Partick Thistle U20	2016–17	—			—		—		2 (Note: Appearance(s) in Scottish Challenge Cup)	0	2	0
Partick Thistle U20	2017–18	—			—		—		2	0	2	0
Partick Thistle U20	Total		—		—		—		4	0	4	0
Partick Thistle	2016–17	Scottish Premiership	5	0	1	0	0	0	—		6	0
Partick Thistle	2017–18	Scottish Premiership	15	0	2	0	2	0	1 (Note: Appearance(s) in Scottish Premiership play-offs)	0	20	0
Partick Thistle	2018–19	Scottish Championship	7	0	0	0	4	0	0	0	11	0
Partick Thistle	Total		27	0	3	0	6	0	1	0	37	0
Queen of the South	2019–20	Scottish Championship	4	0	1	0	4	0	0	0	9	0
Peterhead	2019–20	Scottish League One	3	0	—		—		—		3	0
Peterhead	2020–21	Scottish League One	19	0	1	0	4	0	0	0	24	0
Peterhead	2021–22	Scottish League One	29	1	3	1	1	0	2	0	35	2
Peterhead	2022–23	Scottish League One	23	0	1	0	0	0	0	0	24	0
Peterhead	2023–24	Scottish League Two	29	0	1	0	3	0	4 (Note: Two appearances, two goals in Scottish Challenge Cup; Two appearances in Scottish League One play-offs)	2	37	2
Peterhead	2024–25	Scottish League Two	28	2	2	1	3	0	0	0	33	3
Peterhead	2025–26	Scottish League One	9	1	0	0	4	0	3	1	16	2
Peterhead	Total		140	4	8	2	15	0	9	3	172	9
Career total			171	4	12	2	25	0	14	3	222	9
