= Lars Lokotsch =

German footballer

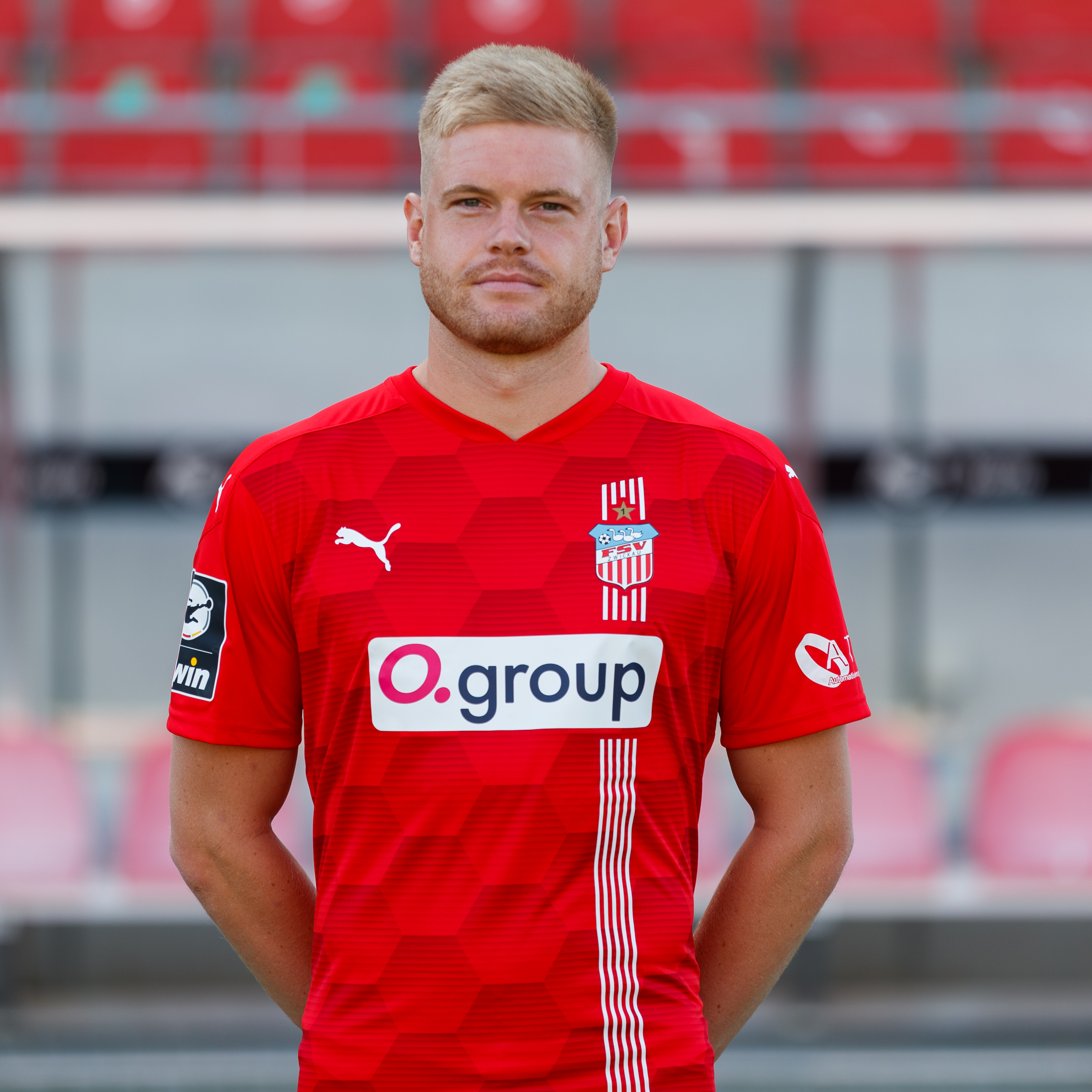
- Lokotsch in 2021

Personal information
- Date of birth: 17 May 1996 (age 30)
- Place of birth: Bad Honnef, Germany
- Height: 1.90 m (6 ft 3 in)
- Position: Forward

Team information
- Current team: FC Ingolstadt
- Number: 13

Youth career
- 2010–2014: FC Hennef 05

Senior career*
Years	Team	Apps	(Gls)
2014–2015	FC Hennef 05 II	2	(2)
2015–2016	FV Bad Honnef	0	(0)
2016–2017	TuS 05 Oberpleis	41	(34)
2017–2018	Bonner SC	28	(4)
2018–2019	TV Herkenrath	19	(9)
2019–2020	SV Rödinghausen	34	(9)
2020–2021	Livingston	4	(0)
2020–2021	→ Raith Rovers (loan)	7	(1)
2021–2022	FSV Zwickau	48	(6)
2022–2023	Fortuna Köln	31	(13)
2023–2025	SC Verl	62	(20)
2025–2026	Preußen Münster	23	(1)
2026–	FC Ingolstadt	0	(0)
- * Club domestic league appearances and goals as of 18 May 2026

Lars Lokotsch (born 17 May 1996) is a German professional footballer who plays as a forward for 3. Liga club FC Ingolstadt.

== Career ==
Born in Bad Honnef, Lokotsch spent his early career in the German lower leagues, playing for FC Hennef 05, FV Bad Honnef, TuS 05 Oberpleis, Bonner SC, TV Herkenrath and SV Rödinghausen.

In August 2020 he signed for Scottish club Livingston. He moved on loan to Raith Rovers in October 2020.

He returned to Germany in January 2021, joining 3. Liga club FSV Zwickau.

On 5 June 2023, Lokotsch agreed to join SC Verl for the 2023–24 season.

On 18 June 2025, Lokotsch signed with Preußen Münster in 2. Bundesliga.
