= Ross Stewart (footballer, born 1995) =

Scottish footballer

Personal information
- Full name: Ross Mark Stewart
- Date of birth: 10 April 1995 (age 31)
- Place of birth: Glasgow, Scotland
- Height: 1.88 m (6 ft 2 in)
- Position: Goalkeeper

Team information
- Current team: Alloa Athletic
- Number: 1

Senior career*
Years	Team	Apps	(Gls)
2012–2015	Motherwell	1	(0)
2015–2017	Albion Rovers	72	(0)
2017–2018	St Mirren	0	(0)
2018–2021	Livingston	9	(0)
2019–2020	→ Queen of the South (loan)	9	(0)
2020–2021	→ Heart of Midlothian (loan)	1	(0)
2021–2023	Heart of Midlothian	5	(0)
2024	Partick Thistle	3	(0)
2024–2026	Queen of the South	68	(0)
2026–	Alloa Athletic	10	(0)

International career^{‡}
2011	Scotland U17	1	(0)
2013	Scotland U18	1	(0)
2014	Scotland U19	1	(0)
- * Club domestic league appearances and goals as of 17 October 2026 ‡ National team caps and goals as of 22:00, 10 March 2020 (UTC)

Ross Mark Stewart (born 10 April 1995) is a Scottish professional footballer who plays as a goalkeeper for Scottish League One club Alloa Athletic.

== Career ==
=== Motherwell ===
Stewart is a graduate from the Motherwell youth system and was in direct competition with first-team back-up goalkeeper Lee Hollis for a place on the bench during the 2012–13 season.

On 12 May 2013, Stewart made his first-team debut from the bench, replacing goalkeeper Darren Randolph in a 2–0 win versus Ross County.

=== Albion Rovers ===
In June 2015, Stewart signed for newly promoted Scottish League One club Albion Rovers from Coatbridge, after being released by the Fir Park club.

=== St Mirren ===
On 24 May 2017, after two years at Cliftonhill, Stewart signed a two-year deal with St Mirren.

=== Livingston ===
In July 2018, Stewart signed for Livingston and on 4 May 2019, debuted for the Lions in a 1–1 draw versus St Johnstone at McDiarmid Park.

==== Queen of the South (loan) ====
On 23 January 2020, Stewart was loaned out to Dumfries club Queen of the South until 31 May 2020. On 8 February, Stewart faced two penalties against Bob McHugh in the Doonhamers league match at Cappielow versus Greenock Morton in a 2–2 draw, conceding the first in the 59th minute, then saving the second in the 67th minute.

==== Hearts (loan) ====
On 13 August 2020, Stewart signed a six-month loan deal with Heart of Midlothian until January 2021. On 22 January 2021, the loan was extended for the remainder of the 2020-21 season.

=== Hearts ===
On 4 May 2021, Stewart signed a pre-contract agreement with Hearts, securing a two-year contract. On 1 July 2023, he was released at the end of this contract.

In November 2023, he started training with EFL League One club Carlisle United; he was on the verge of signing with an English club for the first time in his career, until a contract issue scuppered the move.

=== Partick Thistle ===
In January 2024 Stewart signed for Scottish Championship club Partick Thistle on a deal until the end of the season.

=== Queen of the South ===
On 3 June 2024, Stewart rejoined Queen of the South on a one-year contract.

=== Alloa Athletic ===
On 7 June 2026, Stewart signed for Scottish League One side Alloa Athletic.

== Career statistics ==
As of 20 February 2022

Appearances and goals by club, season and competition
Club	Season	League			Scottish Cup		League Cup		Other		Total	
Club	Season	Division	Apps	Goals	Apps	Goals	Apps	Goals	Apps	Goals	Apps	Goals
Motherwell	2012–13	Scottish Premier League	1	0	0	0	0	0	0	0	1	0
Motherwell	2013–14	Scottish Premiership	0	0	0	0	0	0	0	0	0	0
Motherwell	2014–15	Scottish Premiership	0	0	0	0	0	0	0	0	0	0
Motherwell	Total		1	0	0	0	0	0	0	0	1	0
Albion Rovers	2015–16	Scottish League One	36	0	1	0	1	0	0	0	38	0
Albion Rovers	2016–17	Scottish League One	36	0	2	0	4	0	2 (Note: Appearances in the Scottish Challenge Cup)	0	44	0
Albion Rovers	Total		72	0	3	0	5	0	2	0	82	0
St Mirren	2017–18	Scottish Championship	0	0	0	0	1	0	3	0	4	0
Livingston	2018–19	Scottish Premiership	2	0	0	0	0	0	0	0	2	0
Livingston	2019–20	Scottish Premiership	7	0	0	0	2	0	0	0	9	0
Livingston	2020–21	Scottish Premiership	0	0	0	0	0	0	0	0	0	0
Livingston	Total		9	0	0	0	2	0	0	0	11	0
Queen of the South (loan)	2019-20	Scottish Championship	9	0	0	0	0	0	0	0	9	0
Heart of Midlothian (loan)	2020–21	Scottish Championship	1	0	1	0	2	0	0	0	4	0
Heart of Midlothian	2021–22	Scottish Premiership	2	0	0	0	0	0	0	0	2	0
Career total			93	0	3	0	10	0	5	0	111	0
