= Johnny Gibson (footballer) =

English footballer

Personal information
- Date of birth: 23 December 1950 (age 75)
- Place of birth: Hull, England
- Position: Right winger

Youth career
- Clydebank B.G.

Senior career*
Years	Team	Apps	(Gls)
1968–1975	Partick Thistle	93	(13)
1975–1976	Ayr United	5	(0)
1976–1977	St Mirren	1	(0)
1977–1978	Celtic	3	(0)
1978–1980	East Fife	24	(2)
1980–1981	Forfar Athletic	8	(0)
1981–1982	Stirling Albion	4	(0)
- Sauchie
Total		138	(15)
- * Club domestic league appearances and goals

Johnny Gibson (born 23 December 1950) is an English former footballer, who played for Partick Thistle, Ayr United, St Mirren, Celtic, East Fife, Forfar Athletic and Stirling Albion in the Scottish Football League. Gibson was part of the Partick Thistle team that won the 1971–72 Scottish League Cup, defeating Celtic 4–1 in the cup final.
