= 1971 Scottish League Cup final =

- Event: 1971–72 Scottish League Cup
Partick Thistle	Celtic
4	1
- Date: 23 October 1971
- Venue: Hampden Park, Glasgow
- Referee: W.J. Mullan (Dalkeith)
- Attendance: 62,470

The 1971 Scottish League Cup final was played on 23 October 1971 and was the final of the 26th Scottish League Cup competition. Newly promoted Partick Thistle beat Celtic, who had played in the European Cup final in 1970, in a major upset. Sam Leitch, a presenter of BBC sports show Grandstand, previewed the game by saying that:

In Scotland, it's League Cup final day at Hampden Park, where Celtic meet Partick Thistle, who have no chance.

Thistle went 4–0 up inside 37 minutes, causing the reported crowd of 62,470 to allegedly be swelled by many thousands of Rangers fans who were keen to see their Old Firm rivals be humiliated. Kenny Dalglish pulled a goal back for Celtic in the second half, but Thistle held on to win 4–1.

== Match details ==
23 October 1971

Partick Thistle	4–1	Celtic
Rae 10'; Lawrie 15'; McQuade 28'; Bone 37'	Report (page 4)	Dalglish 70'

Hampden Park, Glasgow
Attendance: 62,470

PARTICK THISTLE:
GK	1	Alan Rough
DF	2	John Hansen
DF	3	Alex Forsyth
MF	4	Ronnie Glavin	Substituted off
DF	5	Jackie Campbell
DF	6	Hugh Strachan
MF	7	Denis McQuade
FW	8	Frank Coulston
FW	9	Jimmy Bone
MF	10	Alex Rae (c)
MF	11	Bobby Lawrie
Substitutes:
MF	?	Johnny Gibson	Substituted on
Manager:
Davie McParland

CELTIC:
GK	1	Evan Williams
DF	2	David Hay
DF	3	Tommy Gemmell
MF	4	Bobby Murdoch (c)
MF	5	George Connelly
DF	6	Jim Brogan
MF	7	Jimmy Johnstone	Substituted off
FW	8	Kenny Dalglish
MF	9	Harry Hood
MF	10	Tommy Callaghan
FW	11	Lou Macari
Substitutes:
DF	?	Jim Craig	Substituted on
Manager:
Jock Stein
