= Frank Coulston =

Scottish footballer

Personal information
- Date of birth: 5 October 1942 (age 84)
- Place of birth: Stranraer, Scotland
- Position: Forward

Youth career
- Stranraer Juniors

Senior career*
Years	Team	Apps	(Gls)
1963–1964	Queen's Park	0	(0)
1964–1967	Stranraer		
1967–1975	Partick Thistle	183	(58)
1975–1976	Stranraer	20	(3)
1976–1977	Stenhousemuir	34	(7)
Total		237	(68)
- * Club domestic league appearances and goals

Frank Coulston (born 5 October 1942) is a Scottish former footballer who played for Partick Thistle, Stranraer, and Stenhousemuir in the Scottish Football League in the 1960s and 1970s. Coulston was part of the Partick Thistle side that surprisingly won the Scottish League Cup Final by 4–1 against Celtic in 1971.
