= Robert Law =

Robert Law may refer to:

- Robert Law (British Army officer) (c. 1788–1874), British Army officer and colonial administrator
- Robert Adger Law (1879–1961), American Shakespeare scholar and professor
- Robert D. Law (1944–1969), United States Medal of Honor recipient
- Bobby Law (born 1965), Scottish footballer
- Bob Law (1934–2004), artist
- Rob Law (born 1997), Canadian international lawn and indoor bowler
- Robert T. Law, American lawyer and U.S. government official
