= 1971–72 Scottish League Cup =

Tournament details
- Country: Scotland

Final positions
- Champions: Partick Thistle
- Runners-up: Celtic

The 1971–72 Scottish League Cup was the twenty-sixth season of Scotland's second football knockout competition. The competition was won by Partick Thistle, who defeated Celtic in the Final.

== First round ==
=== Group 1 ===
| Team | Pld | W | D | L | GF | GA | GD | Pts |
|---|---|---|---|---|---|---|---|---|
| Hibernian | 6 | 5 | 1 | 0 | 14 | 3 | +11 | 11 |
| Kilmarnock | 6 | 2 | 1 | 3 | 7 | 9 | −2 | 5 |
| Dundee United | 6 | 2 | 1 | 3 | 9 | 13 | −4 | 5 |
| Motherwell | 6 | 1 | 1 | 4 | 7 | 12 | −5 | 3 |

| Home team | Score | Away team | Date |
|---|---|---|---|
| Dundee United | 1–0 | Kilmarnock | 14 August 1971 |
| Motherwell | 0–3 | Hibernian | 14 August 1971 |
| Hibernian | 2–0 | Dundee United | 18 August 1971 |
| Kilmarnock | 2–1 | Motherwell | 18 August 1971 |
| Dundee United | 2–2 | Motherwell | 21 August 1971 |
| Hibernian | 3–1 | Kilmarnock | 21 August 1971 |
| Dundee United | 1–4 | Hibernian | 25 August 1971 |
| Motherwell | 2–0 | Kilmarnock | 25 August 1971 |
| Hibernian | 2–1 | Motherwell | 28 August 1971 |
| Kilmarnock | 4–2 | Dundee United | 28 August 1971 |
| Kilmarnock | 0–0 | Hibernian | 1 September 1971 |
| Motherwell | 1–3 | Dundee United | 1 September 1971 |

=== Group 2 ===
| Team | Pld | W | D | L | GF | GA | GD | Pts |
|---|---|---|---|---|---|---|---|---|
| Falkirk | 6 | 4 | 1 | 1 | 12 | 6 | +6 | 9 |
| Dundee | 6 | 3 | 2 | 1 | 10 | 5 | +5 | 8 |
| Aberdeen | 6 | 3 | 1 | 2 | 11 | 7 | +4 | 7 |
| Clyde | 6 | 0 | 0 | 6 | 2 | 17 | −15 | 0 |

| Home team | Score | Away team | Date |
|---|---|---|---|
| Aberdeen | 1–1 | Dundee | 14 August 1971 |
| Falkirk | 5–2 | Clyde | 14 August 1971 |
| Clyde | 0–2 | Aberdeen | 18 August 1971 |
| Dundee | 2–2 | Falkirk | 18 August 1971 |
| Aberdeen | 1–0 | Falkirk | 21 August 1971 |
| Clyde | 0–1 | Dundee | 21 August 1971 |
| Aberdeen | 5–0 | Clyde | 25 August 1971 |
| Falkirk | 1–0 | Dundee | 25 August 1971 |
| Clyde | 0–1 | Falkirk | 28 August 1971 |
| Dundee | 3–1 | Aberdeen | 28 August 1971 |
| Dundee | 3–0 | Clyde | 1 September 1971 |
| Falkirk | 3–1 | Aberdeen | 1 September 1971 |

=== Group 3 ===
| Team | Pld | W | D | L | GF | GA | GD | Pts |
|---|---|---|---|---|---|---|---|---|
| St Johnstone | 6 | 3 | 1 | 2 | 8 | 7 | +1 | 7 |
| Heart of Midlothian | 6 | 3 | 0 | 3 | 12 | 6 | +6 | 6 |
| Airdrieonians | 6 | 3 | 0 | 3 | 7 | 9 | −2 | 6 |
| Dunfermline Athletic | 6 | 2 | 1 | 3 | 4 | 9 | −5 | 5 |

| Home team | Score | Away team | Date |
|---|---|---|---|
| Dunfermline Athletic | 2–1 | Airdrieonians | 14 August 1971 |
| Heart of Midlothian | 4–1 | St Johnstone | 14 August 1971 |
| Airdrieonians | 1–3 | Heart of Midlothian | 18 August 1971 |
| St Johnstone | 1–1 | Dunfermline Athletic | 18 August 1971 |
| Airdrieonians | 1–3 | St Johnstone | 21 August 1971 |
| Dunfermline Athletic | 1–0 | Heart of Midlothian | 21 August 1971 |
| Dunfermline Athletic | 0–2 | St Johnstone | 25 August 1971 |
| Heart of Midlothian | 1–2 | Airdrieonians | 25 August 1971 |
| Airdrieonians | 1–0 | Dunfermline Athletic | 28 August 1971 |
| St Johnstone | 1–0 | Heart of Midlothian | 28 August 1971 |
| Heart of Midlothian | 4–0 | Dunfermline Athletic | 1 September 1971 |
| St Johnstone | 0–1 | Airdrieonians | 1 September 1971 |

=== Group 4 ===
| Team | Pld | W | D | L | GF | GA | GD | Pts |
|---|---|---|---|---|---|---|---|---|
| Celtic | 6 | 5 | 0 | 1 | 13 | 2 | +11 | 10 |
| Rangers | 6 | 4 | 0 | 2 | 11 | 5 | +6 | 8 |
| Morton | 6 | 2 | 1 | 3 | 4 | 5 | −1 | 5 |
| Ayr United | 6 | 0 | 1 | 5 | 2 | 18 | −16 | 1 |

| Home team | Score | Away team | Date |
|---|---|---|---|
| Ayr United | 1–1 | Morton | 14 August 1971 |
| Celtic | 2–0 | Rangers | 14 August 1971 |
| Morton | 0–1 | Celtic | 18 August 1971 |
| Rangers | 4–0 | Ayr United | 18 August 1971 |
| Ayr United | 0–3 | Celtic | 21 August 1971 |
| Rangers | 2–0 | Morton | 21 August 1971 |
| Ayr United | 0–4 | Rangers | 25 August 1971 |
| Celtic | 0–1 | Morton | 25 August 1971 |
| Morton | 2–0 | Ayr United | 28 August 1971 |
| Rangers | 0–3 | Celtic | 28 August 1971 |
| Celtic | 4–1 | Ayr United | 1 September 1971 |
| Morton | 0–1 | Rangers | 1 September 1971 |

=== Group 5 ===
| Team | Pld | W | D | L | GF | GA | GD | Pts |
|---|---|---|---|---|---|---|---|---|
| Clydebank | 6 | 4 | 2 | 0 | 17 | 9 | +8 | 10 |
| Queen's Park | 6 | 2 | 2 | 2 | 8 | 8 | 0 | 6 |
| Cowdenbeath | 6 | 1 | 2 | 3 | 8 | 10 | −2 | 4 |
| Berwick Rangers | 6 | 1 | 2 | 3 | 7 | 13 | −6 | 4 |

| Home team | Score | Away team | Date |
|---|---|---|---|
| Berwick Rangers | 2–2 | Clydebank | 14 August 1971 |
| Queen's Park | 1–0 | Cowdenbeath | 14 August 1971 |
| Clydebank | 3–2 | Queen's Park | 18 August 1971 |
| Cowdenbeath | 2–2 | Berwick Rangers | 18 August 1971 |
| Berwick Rangers | 2–3 | Queen's Park | 21 August 1971 |
| Clydebank | 2–1 | Cowdenbeath | 21 August 1971 |
| Berwick Rangers | 0–1 | Cowdenbeath | 25 August 1971 |
| Queen's Park | 1–1 | Clydebank | 25 August 1971 |
| Clydebank | 5–0 | Berwick Rangers | 28 August 1971 |
| Cowdenbeath | 1–1 | Queen's Park | 28 August 1971 |
| Cowdenbeath | 3–4 | Clydebank | 1 September 1971 |
| Queen's Park | 0–1 | Berwick Rangers | 1 September 1971 |

=== Group 6 ===
| Team | Pld | W | D | L | GF | GA | GD | Pts |
|---|---|---|---|---|---|---|---|---|
| Stirling Albion | 6 | 5 | 1 | 0 | 14 | 7 | +7 | 11 |
| Queen of the South | 6 | 3 | 0 | 3 | 9 | 8 | +1 | 6 |
| Stenhousemuir | 6 | 2 | 0 | 4 | 9 | 13 | −4 | 4 |
| Dumbarton | 6 | 1 | 1 | 4 | 8 | 12 | −4 | 3 |

| Home team | Score | Away team | Date |
|---|---|---|---|
| Dumbarton | 1–1 | Stirling Albion | 14 August 1971 |
| Queen of the South | 3–2 | Stenhousemuir | 14 August 1971 |
| Stenhousemuir | 2–3 | Dumbarton | 18 August 1971 |
| Stirling Albion | 2–1 | Queen of the South | 18 August 1971 |
| Queen of the South | 1–0 | Dumbarton | 21 August 1971 |
| Stenhousemuir | 1–3 | Stirling Albion | 21 August 1971 |
| Dumbarton | 1–2 | Stenhousemuir | 25 August 1971 |
| Queen of the South | 1–2 | Stirling Albion | 25 August 1971 |
| Stenhousemuir | 1–0 | Queen of the South | 28 August 1971 |
| Stirling Albion | 3–2 | Dumbarton | 28 August 1971 |
| Dumbarton | 1–3 | Queen of the South | 1 September 1971 |
| Stirling Albion | 3–1 | Stenhousemuir | 1 September 1971 |

=== Group 7 ===
| Team | Pld | W | D | L | GF | GA | GD | Pts |
|---|---|---|---|---|---|---|---|---|
| Partick Thistle | 6 | 4 | 2 | 0 | 18 | 6 | +12 | 10 |
| Arbroath | 6 | 2 | 2 | 2 | 11 | 11 | 0 | 6 |
| Raith Rovers | 6 | 1 | 3 | 2 | 5 | 13 | −8 | 5 |
| East Fife | 6 | 0 | 3 | 3 | 7 | 11 | −4 | 3 |

| Home team | Score | Away team | Date |
|---|---|---|---|
| Partick Thistle | 4–0 | Arbroath | 14 August 1971 |
| Raith Rovers | 2–1 | East Fife | 14 August 1971 |
| Arbroath | 4–0 | Raith Rovers | 18 August 1971 |
| East Fife | 2–3 | Partick Thistle | 18 August 1971 |
| Arbroath | 2–2 | East Fife | 21 August 1971 |
| Raith Rovers | 1–1 | Partick Thistle | 21 August 1971 |
| Partick Thistle | 1–1 | East Fife | 25 August 1971 |
| Raith Rovers | 1–1 | Arbroath | 25 August 1971 |
| Arbroath | 2–4 | Partick Thistle | 28 August 1971 |
| East Fife | 1–1 | Raith Rovers | 28 August 1971 |
| East Fife | 0–2 | Arbroath | 1 September 1971 |
| Partick Thistle | 5–0 | Raith Rovers | 1 September 1971 |

=== Group 8 ===
| Team | Pld | W | D | L | GF | GA | GD | Pts |
|---|---|---|---|---|---|---|---|---|
| St Mirren | 6 | 4 | 0 | 2 | 10 | 5 | +5 | 8 |
| Montrose | 6 | 2 | 2 | 2 | 10 | 10 | 0 | 6 |
| Stranraer | 6 | 2 | 1 | 3 | 9 | 11 | −2 | 5 |
| Albion Rovers | 6 | 2 | 1 | 3 | 5 | 8 | −3 | 5 |

| Home team | Score | Away team | Date |
|---|---|---|---|
| Albion Rovers | 2–1 | Stranraer | 14 August 1971 |
| St Mirren | 4–1 | Montrose | 14 August 1971 |
| Montrose | 1–1 | Albion Rovers | 18 August 1971 |
| Stranraer | 2–0 | St Mirren | 18 August 1971 |
| Montrose | 2–2 | Stranraer | 21 August 1971 |
| St Mirren | 1–0 | Albion Rovers | 21 August 1971 |
| Albion Rovers | 0–2 | Montrose | 25 August 1971 |
| St Mirren | 3–0 | Stranraer | 25 August 1971 |
| Montrose | 0–1 | St Mirren | 28 August 1971 |
| Stranraer | 2–0 | Albion Rovers | 28 August 1971 |
| Albion Rovers | 2–1 | St Mirren | 1 September 1971 |
| Stranraer | 2–4 | Montrose | 1 September 1971 |

=== Group 9 ===
| Team | Pld | W | D | L | GF | GA | GD | Pts |
|---|---|---|---|---|---|---|---|---|
| Alloa Athletic | 4 | 1 | 3 | 0 | 5 | 2 | +3 | 5 |
| Forfar Athletic | 4 | 1 | 2 | 1 | 7 | 5 | +2 | 4 |
| East Stirlingshire | 4 | 1 | 2 | 1 | 9 | 10 | −1 | 4 |
| Brechin City | 4 | 1 | 2 | 1 | 6 | 8 | −2 | 4 |
| Hamilton Academical | 4 | 1 | 1 | 2 | 9 | 11 | −2 | 3 |

| Home team | Score | Away team | Date |
|---|---|---|---|
| Alloa Athletic | 3–0 | Hamilton Academical | 14 August 1971 |
| Forfar Athletic | 2–2 | East Stirlingshire | 14 August 1971 |
| East Stirlingshire | 1–1 | Alloa Athletic | 18 August 1971 |
| Hamilton Academical | 2–2 | Brechin City | 18 August 1971 |
| Alloa Athletic | 1–1 | Brechin City | 21 August 1971 |
| Hamilton Academical | 1–4 | Forfar Athletic | 21 August 1971 |
| Brechin City | 1–4 | East Stirlingshire | 25 August 1971 |
| Forfar Athletic | 0–0 | Alloa Athletic | 25 August 1971 |
| Brechin City | 2–1 | Forfar Athletic | 28 August 1971 |
| East Stirlingshire | 2–6 | Hamilton Academical | 28 August 1971 |

== Supplementary round ==
=== First leg ===
| Home team | Score | Away team | Date |
|---|---|---|---|
| Partick Thistle | 4–1 | Alloa Athletic | 6 September 1971 |

=== Second leg ===
| Home team | Score | Away team | Date | Agg |
|---|---|---|---|---|
| Alloa Athletic | 1–1 | Partick Thistle | 8 September 1971 | 2–5 |

== Quarter-finals ==
=== First leg ===
| Home team | Score | Away team | Date |
|---|---|---|---|
| Clydebank | 0–5 | Celtic | 8 September 1971 |
| Falkirk | 2–0 | Hibernian | 8 September 1971 |
| St Johnstone | 2–0 | Partick Thistle | 20 September 1971 |
| St Mirren | 2–0 | Stirling Albion | 8 September 1971 |

=== Second leg ===
| Home team | Score | Away team | Date | Agg |
|---|---|---|---|---|
| Celtic | 6–2 | Clydebank | 22 September 1971 | 11–2 |
| Hibernian | 1–0 | Falkirk | 22 September 1971 | 1–2 |
| Partick Thistle | 5–1 | St Johnstone | 22 September 1971 | 5–3 |
| Stirling Albion | 0–3 | St Mirren | 22 September 1971 | 0–5 |

== Semi-finals ==
| Home team | Score | Away team | Date |
|---|---|---|---|
| Celtic | 3–0 | St Mirren | 6 October 1971 |
| Partick Thistle | 2–0 | Falkirk | 4 October 1971 |

== Final ==
23 October 1971

| Partick Thistle | 4–1 | Celtic |
|---|---|---|
| Rae 10'; Lawrie 15'; McQuade 28'; Bone 37' | | Dalglish 70' |

Hampden Park, Glasgow
Attendance: 62,470
