= Jackie Campbell =

Scottish footballer

Personal information
- Full name: John Campbell
- Date of birth: 27 February 1946 (age 80)
- Place of birth: Airdrie, Scotland
- Position: Central defender

Youth career
- Greengairs United

Senior career*
Years	Team	Apps	(Gls)
1963–1982	Partick Thistle	406	(1)
- * Club domestic league appearances and goals

John Campbell (born 27 February 1946) is a Scottish former professional footballer. He played his entire career at Partick Thistle for whom he played 578 times in all competitions as a central defender (he is third on the club's all-time appearances list).

His honours are a Scottish Division Two winner's medal in 1970–71, a Scottish League Cup winner's medal in 1971, a Scottish First Division winner's medal in 1975–76 and a Glasgow Cup winner's medal in 1981. His testimonial game came in season 1980–81 and ended in a 6–6 draw.

== See also ==
- List of one-club men
