= John Harvey (footballer, born 1933) =

Scottish footballer

Personal information
- Date of birth: 21 January 1933 (age 93)
- Place of birth: Clydebank, Scotland
- Height: 6 ft 1 in (1.85 m)
- Position: Right half

Senior career*
| Years | Team | Apps | (Gls) |
| 1950–1966 | Partick Thistle | 296 | (15) |
| 1950–1951 | → Baillieston Juniors | | |
| 1966–1967 | Third Lanark | 19 | (1) |

International career
| 1960 | SFA trial v SFL | 1 | (0) |
- * Club domestic league appearances and goals

John Harvey (born 21 January 1933) is a Scottish former footballer, who played primarily for Partick Thistle. He ranks ninth in the club's all-time appearances list with over 400 matches played in all competitions, and was inducted into their 'Hall of Fame' in 2009. He was at the club during a relatively successful era for the Jags across the 1950s and early 60s, but was not selected for any of their three Scottish League Cup final appearances (all of which were lost). He did win the Glasgow Cup on two occasions.

Harvey retired from playing after a single year with Third Lanark who then went out of business. He operated public houses and remained involved in Partick Thistle as manager of their social club, while maintaining a keen interest in other sports including golf, tennis and bowls, living in Bearsden for many years.
