= Bobby Lawrie =

Scottish footballer

Personal information
- Date of birth: 14 November 1947 (age 78)
- Place of birth: Irvine, Scotland
- Position: Left winger

Youth career
- Irvine Meadow
- Troon

Senior career*
Years	Team	Apps	(Gls)
1969–1975	Partick Thistle	141	(14)
1975–1976	Stranraer	15	(3)
- Ardeer Thistle
Total		156	(17)

Managerial career
- 1991–1993: Troon
- 1996–: Whitletts Victoria
- * Club domestic league appearances and goals

Bobby Lawrie (born 14 November 1947) is a Scottish former footballer, who played for Partick Thistle and Stranraer in the Scottish Football League in the 1960s and 1970s. Lawrie was part of the Partick Thistle side that surprisingly won the 1971 Scottish League Cup Final by 4–1 against Celtic, with Lawrie scoring the second Thistle goal.
