= Alan Rough =

Scottish footballer (born 1951)

Alan Rough MBE
Personal information
- Full name: Alan Roderick Rough
- Date of birth: 25 November 1951 (age 74)
- Place of birth: Glasgow, Scotland
- Position: Goalkeeper

Youth career
- Lincoln Youth Club
- Sighthill Amateurs

Senior career*
Years	Team	Apps	(Gls)
1969–1982	Partick Thistle	409	(0)
1982–1988	Hibernian	175	(0)
1988	Orlando Lions		
1988	Celtic	5	(0)
1989	Hamilton Academical	5	(0)
1989–1990	Ayr United	1	(0)
1990–1991	Glenafton Athletic		
Total		596	(0)

International career
1973–1976	Scotland under-23	9	(0)
1976–1986	Scotland	53	(0)
1978	Scottish League XI	1	(0)

Managerial career
- 1990–1995: Glenafton Athletic
Medal record
Scotland
UEFA European U-18 Championship
Bronze medal – third place	1970 Scotland	Team Competition
- * Club domestic league appearances and goals

Alan Roderick Rough (/rʌf/; born 25 November 1951) is a Scottish former professional footballer who played as a goalkeeper. He won 53 caps for Scotland and played in two FIFA World Cups. He also had a long club career, principally with Partick Thistle and Hibernian.

Since retiring as a player, Rough had a spell as manager of junior club Glenafton Athletic and has worked in the media, particularly on radio phone-in shows.

== Early life ==
Rough was born in Glasgow and was educated at Knightswood Secondary School.

== Club career ==
After making his debut at the end of season 1969–70, Rough went on to play 631 games for Partick Thistle in all competitions (409 in the league), which are all-time club records. He was a member of the Partick Thistle team that defeated Celtic 4–1 in the 1971 Scottish League Cup Final.

Rough told The Scotsman in 2010: "I loved playing for Thistle, loved winning the League Cup with them, and maybe I stayed there too long but that was me. I never thought about 'career' and I never bothered about money. All of my business ventures – the pub in Maryhill, the sports shop in Musselburgh – failed. But I absolutely loved standing in the Wembley tunnel next to these English stars like Kevin Keegan and Emlyn Hughes when I was on 40 quid a week at Thistle, when the previous week at Firhill the crowd had been 2100, and we were about to walk on to the park and enjoy a famous win."

Shortly after his testimonial game in 1982 (Scotland XI vs Celtic), Rough transferred to Hibernian for a £60,000 fee. He was eventually replaced by Andy Goram, who also took his place in the Scotland squad.

After leaving Hibs in 1988, Rough played in the United States with Orlando Lions. He also had spells with Celtic (covering for the injured Pat Bonner), Hamilton Academical and Ayr United before leaving senior football.

In 1981, he won the SFWA Footballer of the Year and finished runner-up (separated by a single vote) for Scottish Football Personality of the Year.

== International career ==
Rough was chosen for the Scotland under-18s for the UEFA under-18 Euros held on home soil in 1970.

Rough played in two FIFA World Cup tournaments for Scotland, in 1978 and 1982. He played 53 times for his country, keeping a clean sheet in 16 of those games. Rough was Scotland's most capped goalkeeper at the time of his retirement, but that record was broken by Jim Leighton.

Rough's penultimate cap was won in the tragic circumstances of the 1–1 draw with Wales at Ninian Park, Cardiff in 1985. Rough came on as a half-time substitute because Leighton had lost his contact lenses. The result, secured by a late Davie Cooper penalty kick, meant that Scotland qualified for a play-off against Australia, but manager Jock Stein collapsed and died at the end of the match. Rough was selected for the finals squad by Alex Ferguson, but only played in one further international.

== After playing ==
=== Coaching ===
Rough had a successful five-year spell as the manager (initially player-manager) of Junior club Glenafton Athletic after being appointed in 1990. He led the team to three Scottish Junior Cup finals in a row between 1991–92 to 1993–94, also reaching the semi-finals in 1990–91 and 1994–95. Glenafton lost 4–0 to Auchinleck Talbot in the 1992 final and 1–0 to Largs Thistle in the 1994 final, but did beat Tayport 1–0 in the 1993 final at Firhill Stadium (Rough's home ground for much of his playing career), winning the trophy for the first time. The team also added the Ayrshire First Division title and the Ayrshire Cup to make it a treble in 1992–93, the most successful season in the club's history.

=== Media work ===
Alongside Ewen Cameron, Rough co-presented a football phone-in show on Real Radio Scotland until July 2012, when the station replaced the phone-in with music. From August 2006 to June 2009, the Irish sports broadcaster Setanta Sports simulcasted the show live twice a week on Setanta Sports 1.

He later co-presented a football show along with Peter Martin shown on STV2, STV. The Football Show was eventually moved to YouTube on the channel PLZ Soccer. Alan Rough continues to be a co-host on the show with Peter Martin on Mondays and Fridays covering Scottish football.

=== Director ===
Rough was appointed to the Partick Thistle board of directors in June 2018. He resigned from this position in July 2019 following a boardroom coup which saw chairman Jacqui Low ousted. Rough was re-appointed to the board later in 2019, when Low returned to the chairperson role after the purchase of club shares by her friend Colin Weir. Rough remained a non-executive director at the club until December 2022, when several board members were forced to resign due to fan discontent at the lack of movement on a promise of fan ownership that had been made by Weir before his death.

== Personal life ==
Rough married Margaret Barry, a Daily Mirror reporter, in 2009 after a seventeen-year engagement. Barry has two children from a previous relationship. Rough was previously married to Michelle, a former model and Tennent's girl. Michelle and Alan had one son.

In an interview with Shoot magazine in 1986, Rough said that during his childhood he had supported Partick Thistle and that Chelsea goalkeeper Peter Bonetti was a hero. He was an electrician before playing football professionally, and he liked to play golf and tennis in his spare time. His favourite television shows included Black Adder and Only Fools and Horses, and his favourite musicians were Dire Straits and ELO.

Rough was appointed Member of the Order of the British Empire (MBE) in the 2022 Birthday Honours for services to association football and to charity in Scotland.

== Career statistics ==
Appearances and goals by national team and year
National team	Year	Apps	Goals
Scotland	1976	7	0
Scotland	1977	9	0
Scotland	1978	7	0
Scotland	1979	7	0
Scotland	1980	7	0
Scotland	1981	7	0
Scotland	1982	7	0
Scotland	1983	—	
Scotland	1984	—	
Scotland	1985	1	0
Scotland	1986	1	0
Total		53	0

== Honours ==
=== Player ===
Partick Thistle

- Scottish League Cup: 1971–72
- Scottish First Division: 1970–71, 1975–76 (second tier)
- Glasgow Cup: 1980–81

Scotland national team

- British Home Championship: 1975–76, 1976–77
- Rous Cup: 1985

=== Manager ===
Glenafton Athletic

- Scottish Junior Cup: 1992–93
- Ayrshire First Division: 1992–93
- Ayrshire Junior Cup: 1992–93
- Ayrshire District Cup: 1993–94

=== Individual ===
- SFWA Footballer of the Year: 1980–81
- Scottish FA International Roll of Honour: 1982
- Partick Thistle Hall of Fame: Inducted, 2010
- Hibernian Hall of Fame: Inducted, 2012
- Scottish Football Hall of Fame: Inducted, 2013
- Glenafton Athletic Hall of Fame: Inducted, 2017

== See also ==
- List of footballers in Scotland by number of league appearances (500+)
