= ARR Craib Cup =

Football tournament held in 2012

- Founded: 2012
- Region: Europe
- Teams: 4
- Current champions: (Scotland) Partick Thistle (1st title)
- Most championships: (Scotland) Partick Thistle (1 title)

The ARR Craib Cup was an invitational football tournament held at Firhill, Glasgow, sponsored by and named after a local transport company headquartered in Aberdeen. The only edition took place between 21 and 22 July 2012. It was contested by four teams from the United Kingdom, including three from the host nation Scotland.

== Tournament ==
=== Bracket ===
Semi-finals
21 July – Glasgow (Firhill)
(Scotland) Partick Thistle	2
(Scotland) Celtic	0
21 July – Glasgow (Firhill)
(Scotland) Airdrie United	1
(England) Everton	2

Final
22 July – Glasgow (Firhill)
(Scotland) Partick Thistle	3
(England) Everton	1
Third place
22 July – Glasgow (Firhill)
(Scotland) Celtic	4
(Scotland) Airdrie United	0

=== Results ===
21 July 2012 Semi Final	Partick Thistle	2 – 0	Celtic	Firhill Stadium
12:00	Welsh 32'; Lawless 49'	Celtic Report

21 July 2012 Semi Final	Airdrie United	1 – 2	Everton	Firhill Stadium
14:45	Di Giacomo 63'	Report	Barkley 56'; Garbutt 63'	Attendance: 1,467; Referee: Roache

22 July 2012 3rd/4th Place	Airdrie United	0 – 4	Celtic	Firhill Stadium
12:00		Report	Twardzik 7'; McGregor 71'; Eadie 75'; Watt 85'	Referee: Clancy

22 July 2012 Final	Partick Thistle	3 – 1	Everton	Firhill Stadium
14:45	Welsh 2, 48(pen)' Bannigan 54'		McAleny 52'

== Scorers ==
3 Goals

- Sean Welsh (Partick)

1 Goal

- (Scotland) Callum McGregor (Celtic)
- (England) Conor McAleny (Everton)
- (Scotland) Glen Eadie (Celtic)
- (England) Luke Garbutt (Everton)

1 Goal (cont)

- (Czech Republic) Patrik Twardzik (Celtic)
- (Scotland) Paul Di Giacomo (Airdrie)
- (England) Ross Barkley (Everton)
- (Scotland) Steven Lawless (Partick)
- (Scotland) Stuart Bannigan (Partick)
- (Scotland) Tony Watt (Celtic)
