= Davie McParland =

Scottish footballer and manager

Personal information
- Date of birth: 5 May 1935
- Date of death: 14 July 2018 (aged 83)
- Position: Winger

Youth career
- Larkhall Thistle

Senior career*
Years	Team	Apps	(Gls)
1953–1969	Partick Thistle	416	(71)

International career
1955	Scotland U23	1	(0)
1961–1964	SFL trial v SFA	2	(2)
1962–1964	Scottish League XI	3	(0)

Managerial career
- 1970–1974: Partick Thistle
- 1974–1976: Queen's Park
- 1976–1978: Celtic (assistant)
- 1978–1982: Hamilton Academical
- * Club domestic league appearances and goals

Davie McParland (5 May 1935 – 14 July 2018) was a Scottish football player and manager. He played for Partick Thistle for his whole senior career, making over 400 league appearances.

After retiring as a player, he took over from Scott Symon as manager at Partick Thistle in 1970. McParland led Thistle to promotion to the top division in his first season as manager, and the following year guided them to arguably their greatest triumph, a 4–1 win in the 1971 Scottish League Cup Final against Celtic. Following mid-table finishes in 1972-73 and 1973–74, McParland walked out on Thistle after a disagreement with the board.

In June 1974 McParland left Partick Thistle to become head coach at lower league Queens Park. This was the first time at Queens Park that team selection was handed over totally to the coach. In his first season, Queens Park could only finish 16th in the old Scottish Second Division, well away from getting into the new First Division as the League structure was altered to three divisions. The following year saw them finish fourth in the new Scottish Second Division (third tier), still short of winning promotion.

McParland joined Celtic for the start of season 1976-77 as assistant manager, working under Jock Stein. McParland took charge of the 'tracksuit' aspects of coaching at Celtic whilst Stein watched from the touchline, still not fully recovered from the serious car smash he was involved in the year before. His first season saw Celtic win a league and cup double, however the club finished trophy-less the following season and slumped to a fifth place league finish. He was released by the club at the end of that season.

McParland then became manager of Hamilton Accies, where he spent four seasons before leaving in the autumn of 1982. He had spells as Head of Youth Development at Airdire, Dunfermline and Motherwell. In October 2001 McParland was appointed Director of Football at Dumbarton but was released from his role in May 2002 amidst rumours that he did not get on with manager Tom Carson.

McParland died in July 2018, just days after Thistle had announced their new training ground would be named after him.

== See also ==
- List of one-club men in association football
