= Bobby Law =

Scottish footballer

Personal information
- Full name: Robert Shearer Law
- Date of birth: 24 December 1965 (age 60)
- Place of birth: Bellshill, Scotland
- Height: 5 ft 9 1/2 in (1.77 m)
- Positions: Midfielder; right back

Senior career*
Years	Team	Apps	(Gls)
–	Stonehouse Violet		
1984–1995	Partick Thistle	252	(9)
1995–1996	St Mirren	20	(0)
1996–1997	Ayr United	22	(0)
1997–1998	Stenhousemuir	25	(1)
–	Kilsyth Rangers		
Total		319	(10)
- * Club domestic league appearances and goals

Robert Shearer Law (born 24 December 1965) is a Scottish former footballer who played as a midfielder or right back; his longest spell was with Partick Thistle where he spent eleven seasons, making over 300 appearances and scoring ten goals for the Jags in all competitions. He also played for St Mirren, Ayr United and Stenhousemuir towards the end of his career, which was bookended by time in the junior leagues in Lanarkshire.
