= Denis McQuade =

Scottish footballer

Personal information
- Date of birth: 6 January 1951 (age 75)
- Place of birth: Glasgow, Scotland
- Position: Left winger

Youth career
- St. Roch's

Senior career*
Years	Team	Apps	(Gls)
1969–1978	Partick Thistle	195	(48)
1978–1979	Heart of Midlothian	22	(4)
1979–1980	Hamilton Academical	13	(2)
Total		230	(54)

International career
1972	Scottish League XI	1	(1)
- * Club domestic league appearances and goals

Denis McQuade (born 6 January 1951, in Glasgow) is a Scottish former footballer, who played for Partick Thistle, Hearts and Hamilton. McQuade scored one of the goals for Partick Thistle in their shock 4–1 victory against Celtic in the 1971 Scottish League Cup Final.
