= Alex Rae (footballer, born 1946) =

Scottish footballer and manager

Alex Rae (born 23 August 1946) is a Scottish former football player and manager. Rae played for East Fife, Bury, Partick Thistle, Cowdenbeath and Forfar Athletic. He then managed Forfar Athletic between 1980 and 1983.
