= Partick Thistle F.C. =

Association football club in Glasgow, Scotland

Partick Thistle
- Full name: Partick Thistle Football Club
- Nicknames: The Jags; The Maryhill Magyars; The Harry Wraggs
- Short name: Thistle
- Founded: 1876; 150 years ago
- Ground: Firhill Stadium
- Capacity: 10,887
- Owner: PTFC Trust
- Head coach: Mark Wilson
- League: Scottish Championship
- 2025–26: Scottish Championship, 2nd of 10
- Website: ptfc.co.uk
Home colours

Partick Thistle Football Club are a professional football club from Glasgow, Scotland, and currently plays in the Scottish Championship. Despite their name, the club are based at Firhill Stadium in the Maryhill area of the city, and have not played in Partick since 1908. The club have been members of the Scottish Professional Football League (SPFL) since its formation in 2013, having previously been members of the Scottish Football League.

Since 1936, Thistle have played in their distinctive red-and-yellow jerseys of varying designs, with hoops, stripes and predominantly yellow tops with red trims having been used, although in 2009 a centenary kit was launched in the original navy-blue style to commemorate 100 years at Firhill. Since 1908 the club have won the Scottish Second Division (third tier, now Scottish League One) twice and the Scottish First Division (second tier, now the Scottish Championship) six times, most recently in 2013. Thistle have won the Scottish Cup and the Scottish League Cup in 1921 and 1971 respectively.

In 2013, they became inaugural members of the newly-formed Scottish Premiership under the management of Alan Archibald, and remained there for five consecutive seasons. During this period, Thistle secured major investment and, in 2017, finished in the top six of Scottish football for the first time in over three decades. In the 2020–21 season, Thistle won Scottish League One, the third tier of the SPFL structure, and returned to the Scottish Championship, having been relegated from there in 2019–20.

== History ==
=== Formation and early years ===
Chart of yearly table positions of Partick Thistle in the Scottish football league.

Partick Thistle Football Club was formed in 1876 in the burgh of Partick, which was at that time administratively independent of Glasgow (Partick was not subsumed into Glasgow until 1912). The club's first recorded match (and victory) took place in February against a local junior team, named Valencia. The location of this match, and thereby Thistle's first home ground, was recorded as 'Overnewton Park', which is thought to have been located next to Overnewton Road, just south of Kelvingrove Park. Having established themselves as the most popular team locally ahead of the likes of Partick F.C., in 1891 Partick Thistle joined the Scottish Football Alliance, one of several competitions set up immediately after the formation of the Scottish Football League in 1890. The club won the Second Division championship in 1897 and were elected to the First Division. The following season they were re-elected after finishing in eighth place. In 1900 they were elected back to the top level, having finished as Second Division champions again, but were relegated the following season and then promoted in second place in 1902. This would be the last time Thistle changed their division for almost 70 years. Since joining the Scottish professional leagues in 1893, Thistle had been an unpredictable side, spending four years in the First Division and five in the Second, winning promotion three times. It was during the 1902–03 Scottish Division One season that Thistle set their highest finish in the Scottish league structure, finishing 8th in the table with 19 points. In their first 33 years, they moved from home to home, using parks at Kelvingrove, Jordanvale, Muirpark, Inchview among others. In 1897 they moved to Meadowside, where they played until 1908. After being homeless for over a season, they moved to their present home, Firhill Stadium, in the Maryhill district of Glasgow. They played their first home match at Firhill, on 18 September 1909, in a 3–1 victory against Dumbarton Harp.

=== Cup success and league progress ===
In 1921 Thistle won the Scottish Cup, beating Rangers 1–0 in the final. Johnny Blair scored the only goal of the game, which was held at Celtic Park. The Jags reached the final again nine years later, facing the same opposition, but Rangers won 2–1 in a replay following a 0–0 draw in the first match. In 1935 the Jags won both the Glasgow Cup and the Charity Cup, competitions that were taken seriously at the time.

Although it was over 30 years before Thistle achieved further cup success they not only maintained their top tier status during this period but finished third in the league in 1947–48, 1953–54 and 1962–63. On 23 October 1971 Davie McParland's team secured the club's most famous result against Jock Stein's Celtic in the League Cup final at Hampden Park, Glasgow. 62,470 fans watched Thistle take a dramatic 4–0 lead at half time with goals from Alex Rae, Bobby Lawrie and Jimmy Bone amongst the many emerging talents in the Thistle squad including Alan Rough, Alex Forsyth and Denis McQuade. Kenny Dalglish pulled a goal back for Celtic, however the final result was never in doubt as Thistle eased to a 4–1 victory. Ironically before the match, former BBC sport broadcaster Sam Leitch stated that "In Scotland, it's League Cup final day at Hampden Park, where Celtic meet Partick Thistle, who have no chance."

=== Decline and "Save the Jags" campaign ===
Thistle's fortunes on the pitch declined during the 1980s. Although the club had experienced difficult times before, having dropped into the second tier of Scottish football twice in the 1970s, they had bounced straight back up on both occasions. The relegation of 1982 led to the club's first sustained period outside the top tier since the late 19th century. Between 1986 and 1989, Thistle were owned by Ken Bates, chairman of Chelsea, whose intention was to use Thistle as a feeder club for the English team; however few players moved between the clubs during those years, which were also unsuccessful on the field (they finished 8th in the second tier for five seasons running between 1985–86 and 1989–90).

Although this period of exile ended with promotion in 1992, mounting financial problems, including a debt of over £1.5 million, threatened to put the club out of existence. In 1998 in particular the club was close to going bankrupt and was only kept afloat by the fan-organised "Save the Jags" campaign. Despite avoiding financial oblivion Thistle were relegated to the third tier of Scottish Football in 1997–98 and only narrowly avoided a further relegation the following season, finishing in eighth place.

=== Revival under John Lambie ===
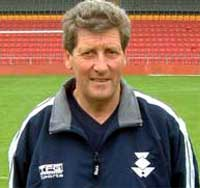
John Lambie

In 1999 John Lambie commenced his third period as manager of the club and under his stewardship Thistle enjoyed a brief revival, winning back-to-back promotions in 2000–01 and 2001–02, the second of which earned the club a place in the Scottish Premier League. SPL guidelines at the time stipulated that clubs would only be eligible for promotion to the league if their stadium had a minimum 10,000 seated capacity. To comply with these guidelines the terraced section at the north end of Firhill was replaced with a 2000-seat stand. Speaking in 2004, Thistle chairman Tom Hughes argued the club did not at the time require a stadium with such a large capacity and building the new stand 'seriously affected [their] competitiveness'. Thistle maintained their place in the SPL under Lambie by finishing 10th in 2002–03, despite being favourites for relegation.

=== Successive relegations and play-off promotion ===
Following Lambie's retirement at the end of the 2002–03 season, Thistle struggled. Gerry Collins (Lambie's previous assistant) was sacked mid-season and replaced with joint player-managers Derek Whyte and Gerry Britton. This change was not enough to revive the team, and Thistle were relegated at the end of the 2003–04 season after Inverness, having won the First Division title, were permitted to groundshare with Aberdeen. In season 2004–05 the team continued to struggle and Whyte and Britton were dismissed mid-season. Dick Campbell, their successor, was unable to avoid relegation to the Second Division. He did return the club to the First Division the following season, through the newly introduced play-off system, having finished 4th in the league. This brought to a close the club's most unpredictable decade, in footballing terms at least: between 1996 and 2006 Thistle had been promoted three times and relegated four times. They were the second team in Scottish football to be relegated from the top flight through successive subsequent relegations, excluding those caused by league reconstruction, after St. Johnstone in the 1980s.

=== Ian McCall's first tenure (2007–2011) ===
McCall managing Thistle

Despite starting well upon returning to the First Division, Dick Campbell was sacked on 27 March 2007, following a succession of poor results. A caretaker management team of Jimmy Bone and Terry Butcher saw out the season before Ian McCall, a former player, was unveiled as manager. McCall's first season saw Thistle finish 6th in the First Division and embark on a successful Scottish Cup campaign, reaching the quarter-finals before being defeated by eventual winners Rangers after a 1–1 draw at Ibrox, Thistle lost the replay 2–0 at Firhill. League form further improved in season 2008–09 with Thistle exceeding expectations to finish 2nd in the First Division, behind St Johnstone. This season saw midfielder Gary Harkins win the Irn Bru Phenomenal Player of the Year and Northern Ireland's Jonny Tuffey become the club's first full international for several years.

McCall quit his post as manager in April 2011, citing personal reasons. Jackie McNamara was initially appointed as caretaker manager before being made full-time manager of the club at the end of the 2010–11 season.

=== Jackie McNamara (2011–2013) ===
McNamara and assistant Simon Donnelly guided Thistle to a sixth-place finish in the 2011–12 season. The following season Thistle started well and emerged as promotion candidates, competing with Dunfermline and Greenock Morton for a place in the following season's top flight. On 29 January 2013 the club gave permission to Dundee United to speak to McNamara about becoming their new manager. The following day McNamara and his assistant Simon Donnelly resigned, to become the new management team at United. Along with Donnelly, Jackie McNamara brought goalkeeper Craig Hinchliffe, Paul Paton and Chris Erskine to Tannadice. Thistle were second in the league at the time and, because McNamara was under contract, compensation was owed to the club.

=== Archibald era and the Scottish Premiership (2013–2018) ===
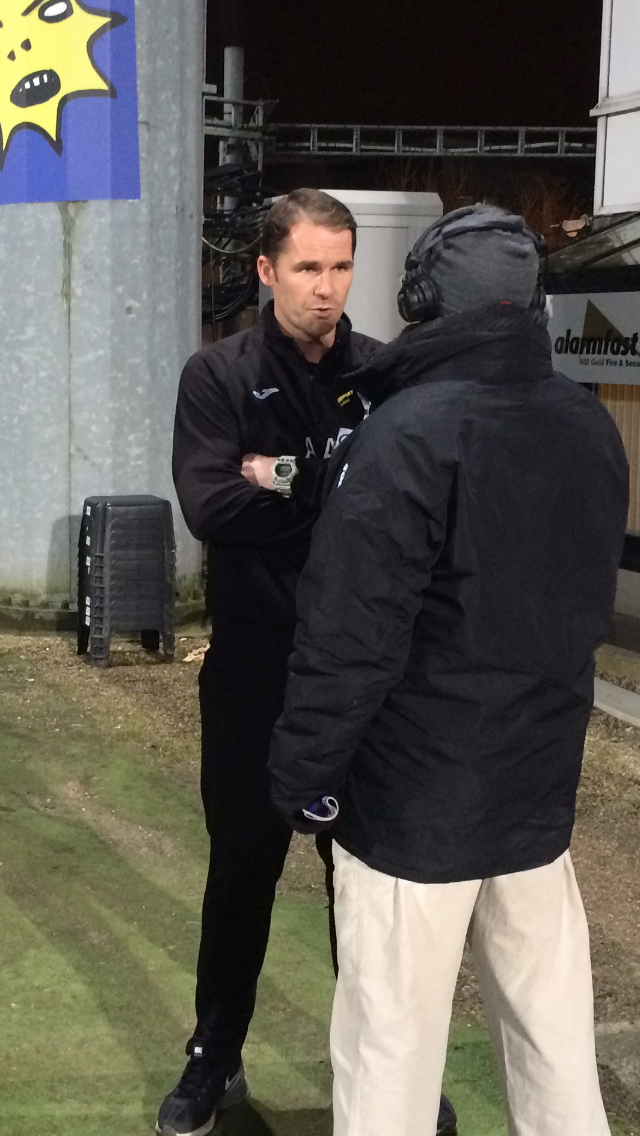
Alan Archibald is interviewed before a match.

On 30 January 2013, Alan Archibald was appointed as the club's interim manager, with former Thistle player Scott Paterson as his assistant. On 22 March, the duo were given the job on a permanent basis signing a one-year rolling contract. The following month on 20 April 2013, the club clinched promotion to the Scottish Premiership having sealed the First Division championship with a 2–0 victory away to Falkirk. The title win meant Thistle returned to the top flight of Scottish football for the first time in nine years. The team also lost the Scottish Challenge Cup final to Queen of the South on penalties in April 2013.

Thistle's initial return to the Premiership had mixed success. The team managed to maintain a relatively positive away record, however it was months before Thistle finally secured a home win, with them beating Aberdeen 3–1 at Firhill in February 2014. Thistle managed to avoid the relegation and play-off spots, eventually finishing third-bottom, following a 4–2 win away to Hearts at Tynecastle. Thistle announced the club were completely free of debt in November 2015.

The 2015–16 Scottish Premiership season saw Thistle secure long-term contracts for many of their key players, including Kris Doolan, Callum Booth, Tomáš Černý and Mustapha Dumbuya.

On 7 May 2016, Thistle secured their Premiership status with a 2–0 away victory to Kilmarnock, with goals coming from Steven Lawless and Kris Doolan. This result meant that Archibald overtook former manager Davie McParland as the record holder of top-flight victories. On 8 April 2017, Thistle beat Motherwell 1–0 to secure a place in the top six for the first time since the league split was first introduced to the Scottish top flight in 2000–01.

In the 2017–18 Scottish Premiership, Thistle finished in 11th position, narrowly avoiding 12th place with Ross County being automatically relegated. Thistle subsequently went into the Scottish Premiership play-offs against Livingston, who had finished second in the Scottish Championship in their first season of returning to the league. On 17 May 2018, Thistle lost the first leg 2–1 away at Almondvale Stadium, with Kris Doolan getting Thistle's goal. Livingston then came to face Thistle at Firhill on 20 May 2018. Livingston won the away leg 0–1 after Keaghan Jacobs scored in the 46th minute. Thistle were relegated to the Scottish Championship after a stay in the top flight of five years. Subsequently, speculation surrounded whether or not Archibald would remain as Thistle's manager. On 24 May, Thistle announced on their website Archibald would remain as Partick Thistle's manager going into the Championship next season. As a result of Thistle's poor season, a number of players were not offered a new contract by the club including captain Abdul Osman, Callum Booth, Steven Lawless, Mustapha Dumbuya, Paul McGinn and Ryan Scully. Transfer listed players were Adam Barton, Niall Keown and Miles Storey. Australian midfielder Ryan Edwards triggered a relegation contract clause, allowing him to leave the club immediately. After a poor start to their 2018–19 Scottish Championship season, Archibald was sacked as manager on 6 October 2018 following a 2–0 loss to Ross County, leaving Thistle 8th in the Championship.

=== Gary Caldwell (2018–2019) ===
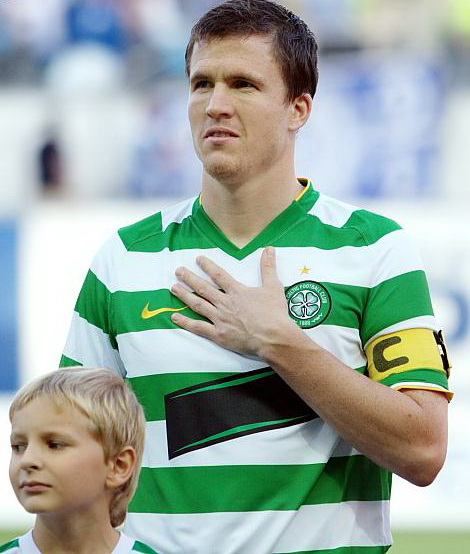
Gary Caldwell took over in 2018.

On 15 October 2018, Thistle announced that former Celtic and Scotland international Gary Caldwell had been appointed as Archibald's replacement. Chairman Jacqui Low said "Put simply, he plans to build a strong defence that allows us to then push forward and play attacking football."

Thistle's first season in the Scottish Championship after relegation was a difficult one; the club were one of the promotion favourites but after a poor first half of the season they were sitting bottom by December and facing the possibility of back to back relegations. Caldwell performed a large squad overhaul in January including the key signing of Scott McDonald who went on to score 7 goals in 13 games. Caldwell managed to turn the season around with the club finishing in 6th position and avoiding further relegation to League One with a 3–0 away win to Queen of the South thus removing the threat of the relegation play-offs. Although safe, Caldwell released striker Kris Doolan who ended his decade-long stay at the club after being informed that his contract would not be renewed. Other players to depart included Miles Storey, Scott McDonald, Niall Keown and Souleymane Coulibaly.

From June 2019 and during the run up to the start of the 2019–20 season, a consortium led by Chinese American billionaire Chien Lee and American businessman Paul Conway looked to buy Partick Thistle, with talks going on throughout the beginning of the season. Partick Thistle Trust, a supporters group and the single biggest shareholder at the time with 19.28% of the club, released a statement urging shareholders not to support the potential takeover bid. By November, the takeover had not taken place.

Thistle made another poor start to the Championship season, picking up two points in the opening five games. Following a 1–1 draw away to Arbroath, Caldwell was sacked as manager.

=== Ian McCall return (2019–2023) and club takeover ===
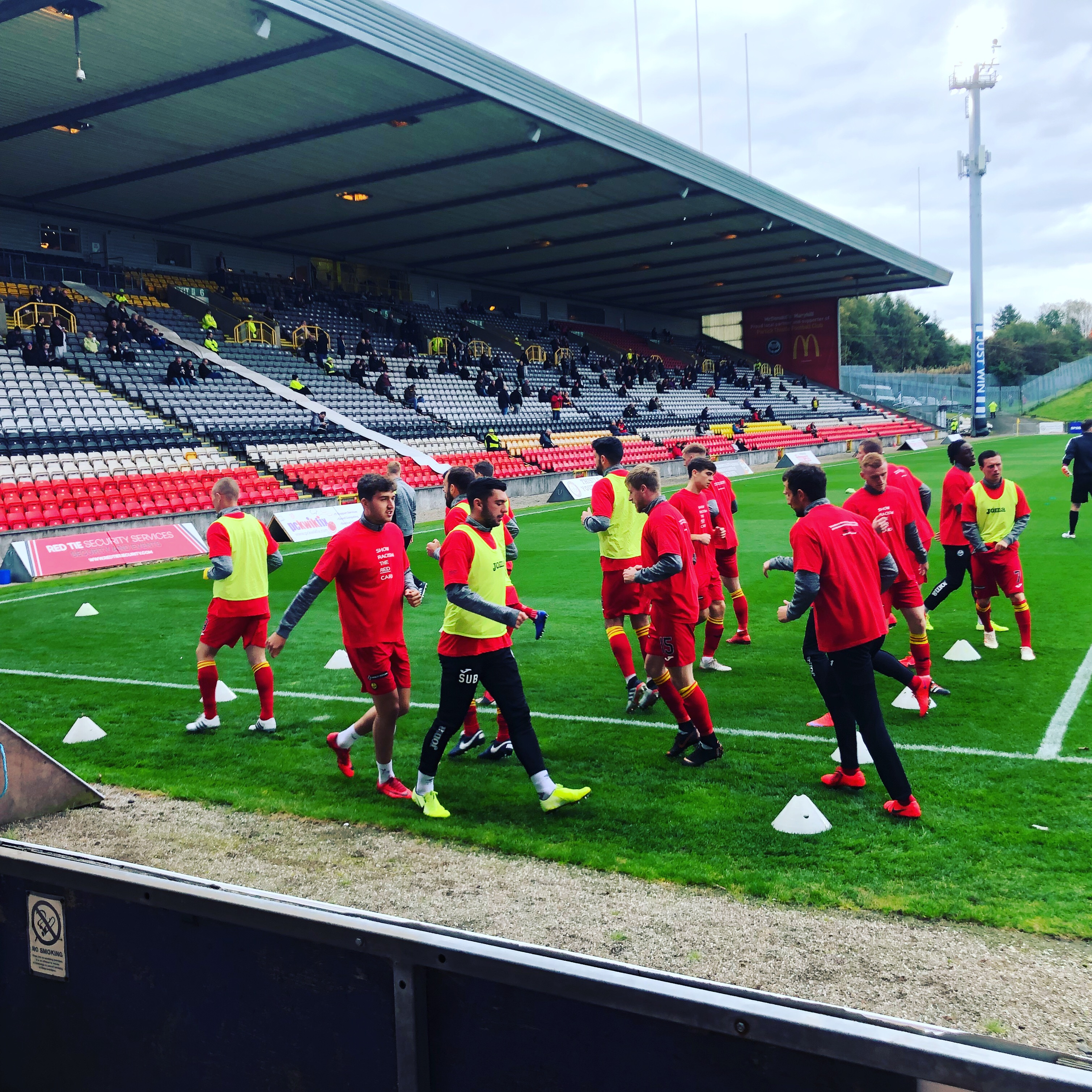
Thistle warm up in 2019

After the sacking of Caldwell, Partick Thistle appointed Ayr United boss Ian McCall as their manager on 23 September 2019.

On 21 November, Euromillions winner Colin Weir completed the takeover of Partick Thistle, instead of the consortium led by Chien Lee and Paul Conway. Weir purchased a majority shareholding and a holding in land at Firhill, Weir then immediately gave the land back to the club. Weir's takeover included the plan to gift the shares of the club back to the fans, to ensure Partick Thistle became a fan owned club, with a Working Group of The PTFC Trust and Thistle Forever plus an interim board overseeing the transfer of shares. After Weir's takeover the club announced that the plans for Partick Thistle's own training ground were to be shelved with the focus instead on completing the takeover and transfer of shares to the fans. In December 2019, majority shareholder and lifelong Jags fan Weir died at the age of 71.

McCall made several changes during the January 2020 transfer window, including bringing in the likes of Brian Graham, Zak Rudden and Darren Brownlie, with veteran striker Kenny Miller among those leaving, but Thistle continued to struggle. Thistle were knocked out of the Scottish Cup in a 2–1 home defeat against Celtic, and later lost in the Scottish Challenge Cup semi final to League One side Raith Rovers.

Scottish football was stopped in March 2020 due to the COVID-19 pandemic, at which time Thistle were in last place in the Championship (two points behind 9th place Queen of the South, although Thistle had a game in hand). A vote was subsequently taken to curtail the Championship, League One and League Two seasons, which meant that Thistle were relegated to League One. After talks of league reconstruction (which would have prevented Thistle being relegated) fell through, and following an anonymous donation, Thistle joined a legal action by Heart of Midlothian (who were relegated from the Scottish Premiership) against the SPFL. After a hearing at the Court of Session, a Scottish Football Association arbitration panel ruled that the SPFL had acted within its powers and therefore confirmed the relegations of Hearts and Thistle, meaning Thistle had now been relegated twice in the space of three seasons, dropping from the Premiership to League One.

The 2020–21 Scottish League One season was a stop-start affair due to COVID-19 and shutdown mid-season for a number of months before restarting in March, with the clubs agreeing to a further reduced 22-game season rather than the 27-game season originally planned. After a mixed first half of the campaign in League One, Thistle went on a fantastic run of form in April, winning six games and drawing two, as they secured the 2020–21 Scottish League One title on 29 April 2021 after defeating Falkirk 5–0 (their first trophy for eight years) and promotion back to the Scottish Championship at the first time of asking. Thistle manager Ian McCall described the title win as the most satisfying of his career.

On their return to the Championship Thistle finished 4th in the league securing a promotion play-off place. Thistle lost 3–1 on aggregate to eventual finalists Inverness in the Premiership to end the 2021–22 season.

Thistle made a good start to the 2022–23 season, sitting top of the Championship after the first 10 games. However, a poor run of form followed. Despite picking up slightly in later weeks, following back to back home defeats to Hamilton Academical and Cove Rangers and a 3–2 defeat to Rangers at Ibrox in the Scottish cup, manager Ian McCall and assistants Alan Archibald and Neil Scally were sacked with Thistle sitting 5th in the Championship table. It was also confirmed former player and hall of famer Kris Doolan had been appointed interim manager.

=== Kris Doolan (2023–2025) ===
After the departure of McCall it was announced that former player and club hall of famer Kris Doolan would take over as interim manager with Paul MacDonald as his assistant. After winning twice away at Ayr United and Dundee and a goalless draw with Arbroath as interim, Doolan was appointed permanent manager of Thistle on 3 March 2023. In Doolan's first game as permanent manager, he guided Thistle to a 3–0 home win over Raith Rovers.

Thistle finished the 2022–23 season in 4th place under Doolan, meaning they entered the play offs at the quarter-final stage. Thistle won the quarter-finals 8–3 on aggregate over 3rd place Queen's Park, becoming the first ever 4th place team to progress past this stage in the Premiership play offs. Thistle then followed this up with an 8–0 aggregate win over 2nd place Ayr United in the semi finals, to advance to the Premiership play off finals. Thistle faced Ross County in the playoff finals. Despite winning the first leg 2–0, Thistle lost the second leg 3–1, taking the tie to extra time, no winner could be found and the match went to penalties, which Ross County won 5–4, meaning Thistle remained in the Scottish Championship.

In Doolan's first full season in charge, Thistle finished 3rd in the Scottish Championship, meaning they once again entered the Scottish Premiership play offs. Thistle beat 4th place Airdrie 3–2 on aggregate to progress to the play-off semi-finals, where they faced 2nd placed Raith Rovers. Thistle lost the first leg at home to Raith 2–1, but won the away leg 2–1, meaning the tie went to extra time. No winner could be found by either side, therefore the tie progressed to a penalty shootout, which Raith won 4–3.

Thistle struggled for consistency in the 2024–25 season, spending much of the season in 4th place. Following a poor run of form Doolan left his position as manager on the 18th of February 2025.

=== Mark Wilson (2025–) ===
Following the departure of Kris Doolan, Thistle confirmed that the duo of men's first team player and captain and Partick Thistle Women's team manager Brian Graham and Thistle under 18s coach Mark Wilson would take interim charge of the first team.

On 31 March, following six games in charge including three wins and three draws, Thistle announced that the interim duo of Graham and Wilson would remain in charge of the first team until the end of the 2024–25 season.

On 7 April Thistle confirmed the appointment of former Northern Ireland and Motherwell manager Ian Baraclough as the club's first ever sporting director.

Following back to back wins over Falkirk and Livingston, Graham and Wilson guided Thistle to the play offs with a 4th place finish. After losing the first leg of the play off quarter-finals 1–0 at home to Ayr, Thistle won the away leg 2–0 to advance to the semi-finals, in which player-manager Brian Graham scored his 99th and 100th goals for the club. In the semi-finals Thistle lost both legs 2–0 to Livingston, ending the club's season.

On 30 May 2025 it was confirmed that Mark Wilson would become the permanent head coach of Partick Thistle. Brian Graham was initially offered the position as a player coach role but turned the offer down. In June 2025, Thistle announced that Alex Rae had joined the club as assistant head coach to Mark Wilson.

In Wilson's first game in permanent charge he guided Thistle to a 4–1 away victory over Edinburgh City in the Scottish League Cup group stages.

In Wilson’s first season in charge he led the club to a 2nd place finish in the Championship, as well as the quarter finals of both the Scottish Cup and League Cup. During the 2025–26 season Thistle went the entire league campaign unbeaten at home.

Under Wilson, Thistle once again reached the Scottish Premiership Play Off Final in May 2026, after beating Dunfermline Athletic 3–2 on aggregate in the semi final. Thistle faced Premiership side St Mirren, after drawing the first leg 1–1 at Firhill, Thistle lost the second leg 1–0 in Paisley, meaning the club remained in the Scottish Championship.

== Club crest and colours ==
The first crest to appear on a Partick Thistle kit was a thistle design, and every logo since has featured a thistle. The thistle appeared first in 1902, then again in 1909. It remained until 1978, when a new logo with the thistle housed inside a roundel was used. A modernist logo with the thistle on a rectangle was introduced in 1990, and the current crest was introduced in 2008.

The Jags flirted with a number of colour schemes in their early years. From their inception until 1900 the kits were predominantly blue with red and white trimmings. There was then a brief period in which the players wore an orange and black striped top with white shorts and black socks. This was replaced in 1905 by a colour scheme close to that used by Aston Villa, before the club reverted to the predominantly blue kits in 1909. In season 1936–37 they changed to, and settled upon, the red-yellow-and-black attire for which they are best known, this change having been triggered initially by the club borrowing kits from the local rugby union team, West of Scotland Football Club.

In 2008–09 and 2009–10, Thistle became the first football club in Scotland to use pink as the primary colour in their away kit. In 2008–09 this took the form of silver- and pink-hooped tops.

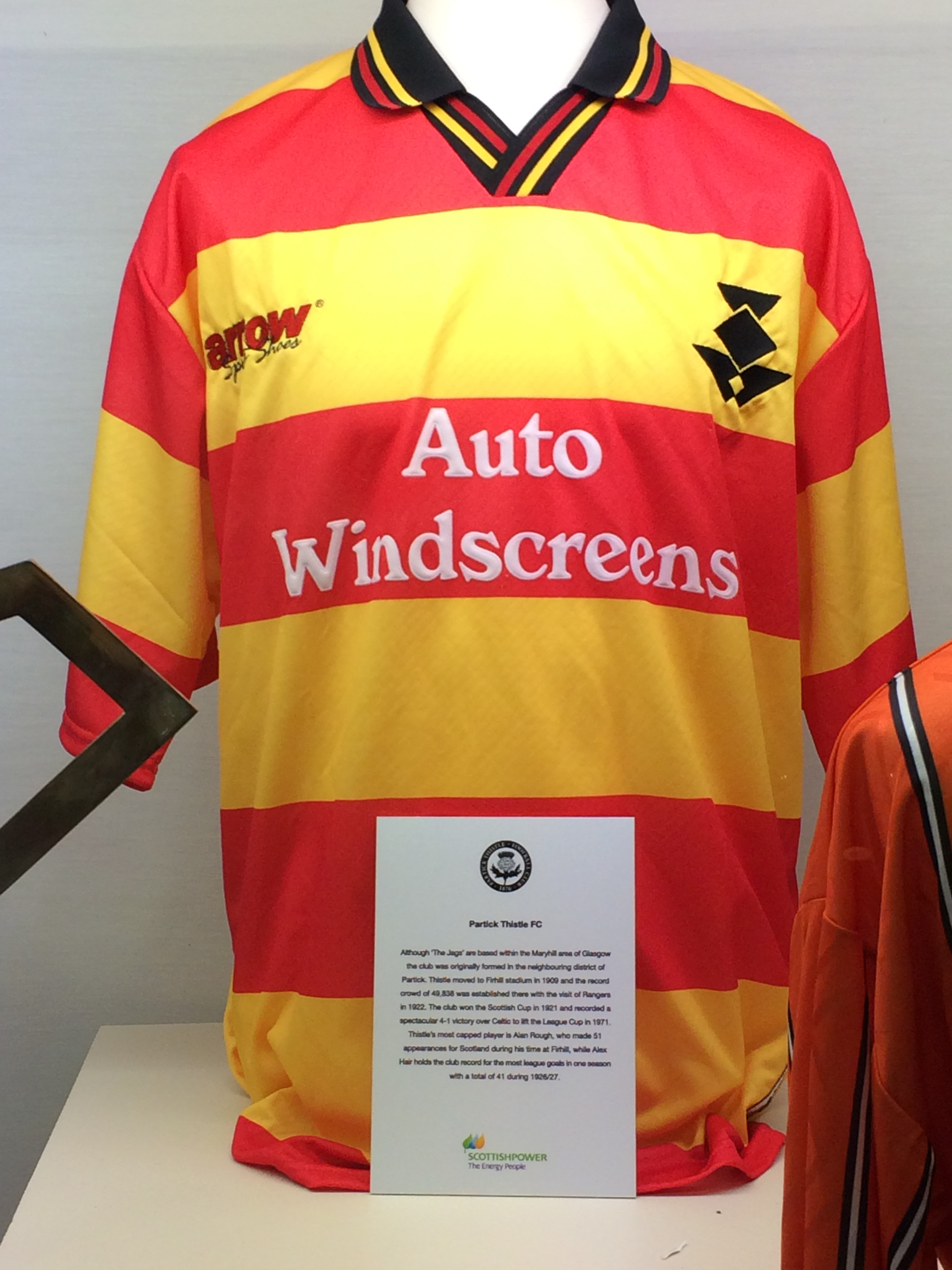
A Partick Thistle home jersey on display at the Scottish Football Museum at Hampden Park.

During the 2014–15 season, Partick Thistle supported the Breast Cancer Care Charity by wearing a black and pink away shirt, with the charity ribbon on the shirt. The partnership saw a portion of kit sale revenue being donated to Breast Cancer Care.

For the 2019–20 season, Partick Thistle released their new away kit which featured a Rainbow flag design under the sleeves to show support for the LGBT movement. By doing so, they became the first Scottish club to incorporate the flag on a football jersey. Club executive Gerry Britton said: "We are really pleased with how the strips look and hope the supporters will like them as much as we do. We were very clear when putting together the design, that we wanted to make a statement about inclusivity and that's what inspired the rainbow feature on the away shirt." It gained global publicity, including from United States goalkeeper Hope Solo.

== Stadium ==
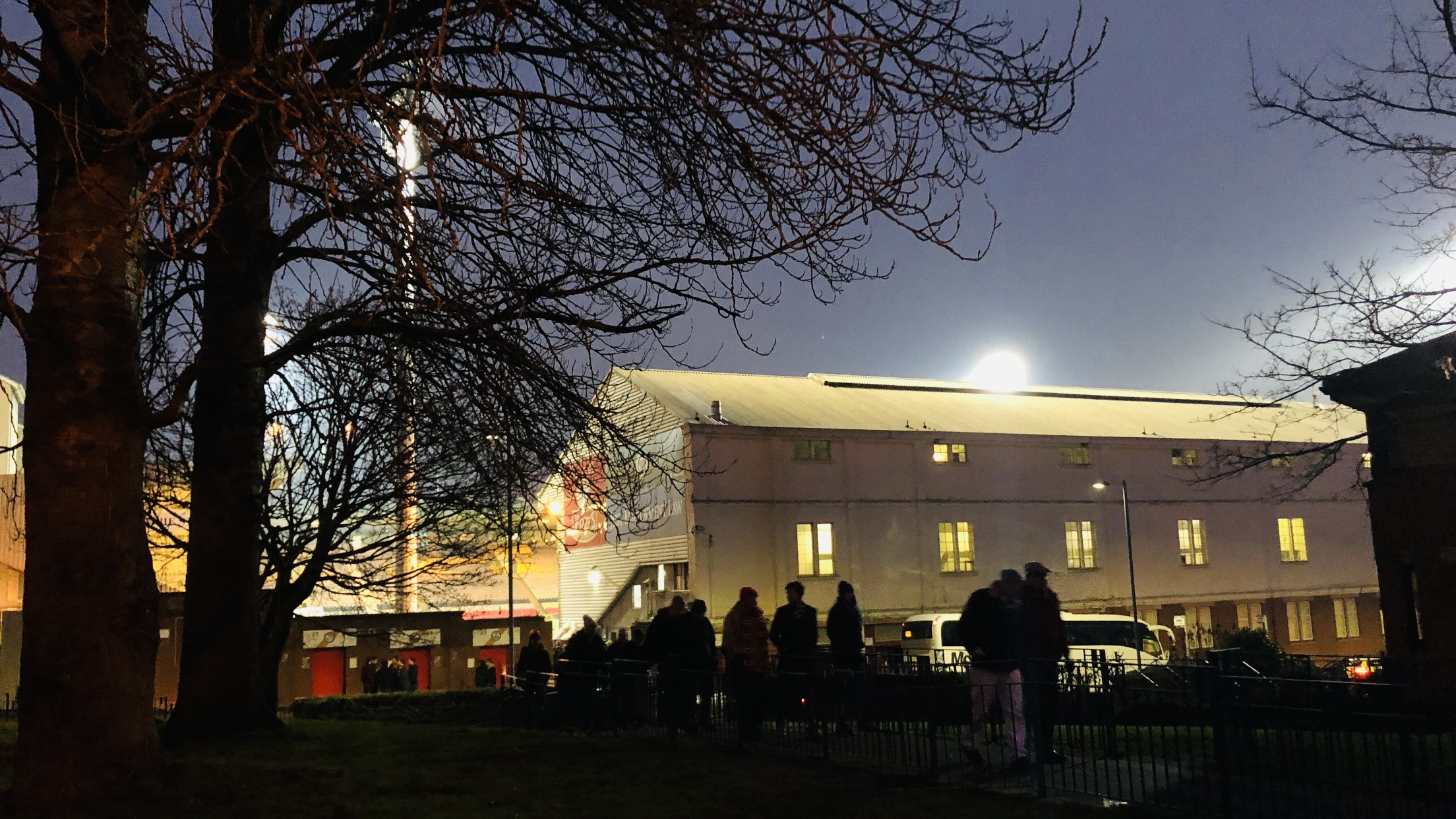
Fans leave Firhill after an evening match in 2019.

Before moving to the Maryhill area in 1909, Partick Thistle hosted their home games over numerous sites in and around Glasgow including Kelvingrove Park, Jordanvale Park and Muir Park. In 1897, the club moved to Meadowside, near the River Clyde. However, in 1908 Thistle were forced to vacate the area to make way for a new shipyard.

After playing at numerous other grounds in Glasgow, Greenock, Port Glasgow, Kilmarnock, Edinburgh and even Aberdeen for over a season, Partick Thistle moved to their present home, Firhill Stadium, in 1909, when they purchased some spare Caledonian Railway land in Maryhill for £5,500. The stadium consists of three stands: the Main Stand which was built in 1927 and can seat around 2,900 supporters; the Jackie Husband Stand, which was built in 1994 and has a capacity of approximately 6,263; and the North Stand, renamed the John Lambie Stand in 2018 in tribute to the legendary club manager who died that year, which can house just over 2000 supporters. On the south side of the stadium there is a grass embankment, known to home fans as "The Bing", which had been open terracing until this was demolished in 2006 due to the stand failing to meet the criteria of Scottish Football Association safety regulations. There have been various plans to redevelop the south end of the stadium but thus far none have come to fruition.

Firhill has been used by other football teams and for rugby over the years. Between 1986 and 1991 Clyde ground shared with Thistle, following their eviction from Shawfield. Hamilton Academical also ground shared for two spells over seven years, following them being forced out of Douglas Park in 1994. In December 2005, Firhill also became the home of Glasgow's professional rugby union team, Glasgow Warriors, when they moved from their previous base at Hughenden. After returning to Hughenden in 2006, the Warriors took up a two-year residency at Firhill from the start of the 2007–08 Celtic League season. This was extended in April 2009 for a further five years. Glasgow Warriors left Firhill after the 2011–12 season and moved to Scotstoun Stadium. During the 2012–13 season the ground was also used by Celtic's under-20 squad as their home ground, but following Thistle's promotion this stopped for the 2013–14 season.

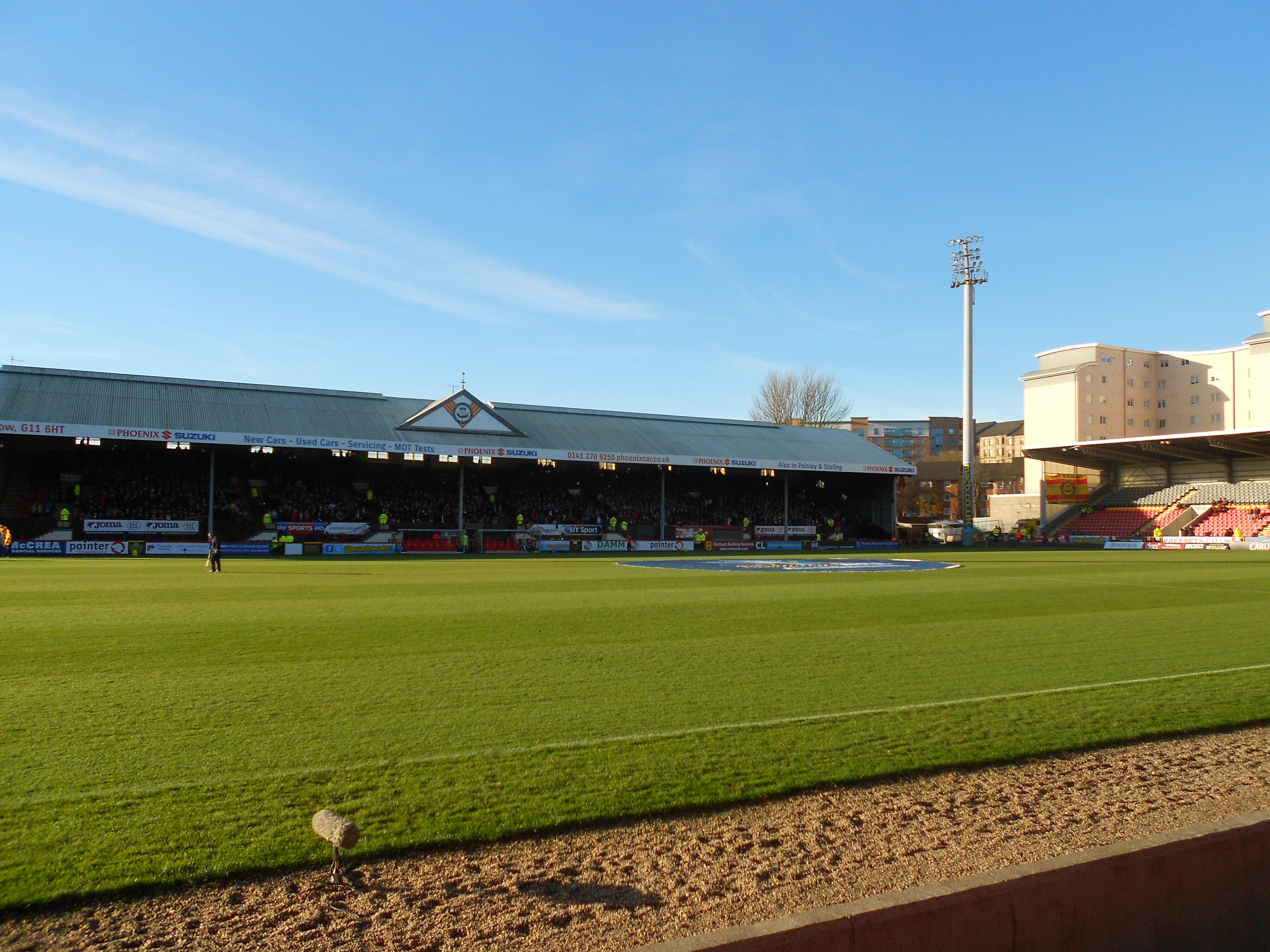
Firhill Stadium

During the 2013–14 season, the Main Stand was re-opened to seat the high number of away supporters. In one instance, the North Stand was used for Celtic supporters as fears grew over fire dangers. During early June 2016 the Main Stand was renamed The Colin Weir Stand in honour of Colin Weir who was made the first ever patron of Partick Thistle after making numerous donations to the club's youth system, the Thistle Weir Academy.

On the Glasgow Subway network, Kelvinbridge and St George's Cross are within 15 minutes walk of the stadium. The A81 road (Maryhill Road), leading to Firhill Road, runs from the M8 motorway and is also the route of several local buses from the city centre. Maryhill and Possilpark & Parkhouse, served by trains from Glasgow Queen Street, are the nearest railway stations to Firhill, but are not particularly close; the walk between the two sites takes around 30 minutes.

=== Training facilities ===
For many years, Thistle struggled to find a permanent training ground at which to base themselves. Subsequently, the club relied on independently owned facilities that usually restricted Thistle's ability to train freely.

As of 2014, the club trained at the University of Glasgow's Garscube Sports Complex on the northern periphery of the city (near Bearsden, East Dunbartonshire).

Thistle's fortunes improved however in April 2017, the month they secured their top-six Premiership status. Millionaire couple Colin and Christine Weir invested in the club again, allowing plans for a new £4 million purpose-built training centre for the club to use as a permanent base. Thistle expected to lease this from the Weirs' company Three Black Cats.

In July 2018, it was announced that the new training facility would be named after Thistle's 1971 Scottish League Cup final manager Davie McParland, who died just days after the announcement was made. The new facility was to be located near the town Kirkintilloch. Plans for the new facility were abandoned in December 2019 as the investment money was instead used by Colin Weir to purchase the club and to operate a fan-owned business model. A short time after this announcement, Weir died at the age of 71.

In preparation for the 2020–21 Scottish League One season, Thistle trained at Burnbrae Stadium in Milngavie, which is the home of rugby union club West of Scotland FC.

== Notable former players ==
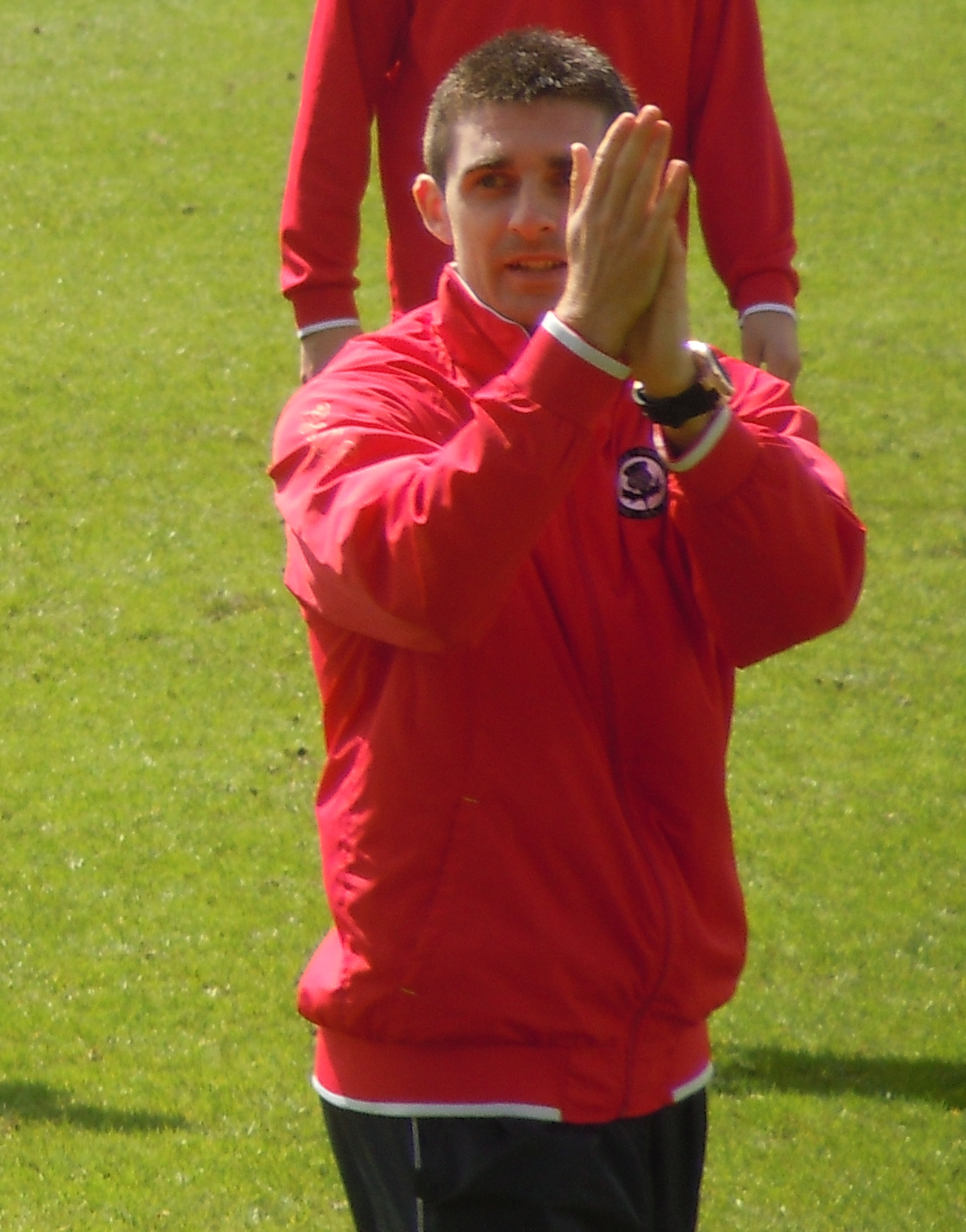
Striker Kris Doolan became the most recent inductee to the club hall of fame in 2019. This was to be his final year at the club after a decade-long stay.

All former players or managers listed have been inducted into either the Scottish Football Hall of Fame or Partick Thistle's own Hall of Fame. These include players who participated in both the 1921 Scottish Cup final and the 1971 Scottish League Cup final.

=== Scottish Hall of Fame ===
- (Scotland) Alan Hansen
- (Scotland) Mo Johnston
- (Scotland) Alan Rough

=== Club Hall of Fame ===
Partial list of those in the Club Hall of Fame.

- (Scotland) Andy Anderson
- (Scotland) Alan Archibald
- (Scotland) Kenny Arthur
- (Scotland) Bertie Auld
- (Scotland) Gerry Britton
- (Scotland) Jackie Campbell
- (Scotland) Chic Charnley
- (Scotland) Nobby Clark
- (Scotland) Kris Doolan
- (Scotland) Neil Duffy
- (Scotland) Chris Erskine
- (Scotland) John Harvey
- (Scotland) Bobby Houston
- (Scotland) Jackie Husband
- (Scotland) John Lambie
- (Scotland) Bobby Law
- (Scotland) Danny Lennon
- (Scotland) Peter McKennan
- (Scotland) Johnny MacKenzie
- (Scotland) Davie McParland
- (Scotland) Denis McQuade
- (Scotland) Alex O'Hara
- (Scotland) Alex Rae
- (Scotland) Doug Somner
- (Scotland) Kenny Watson

== Club culture and fanbase ==
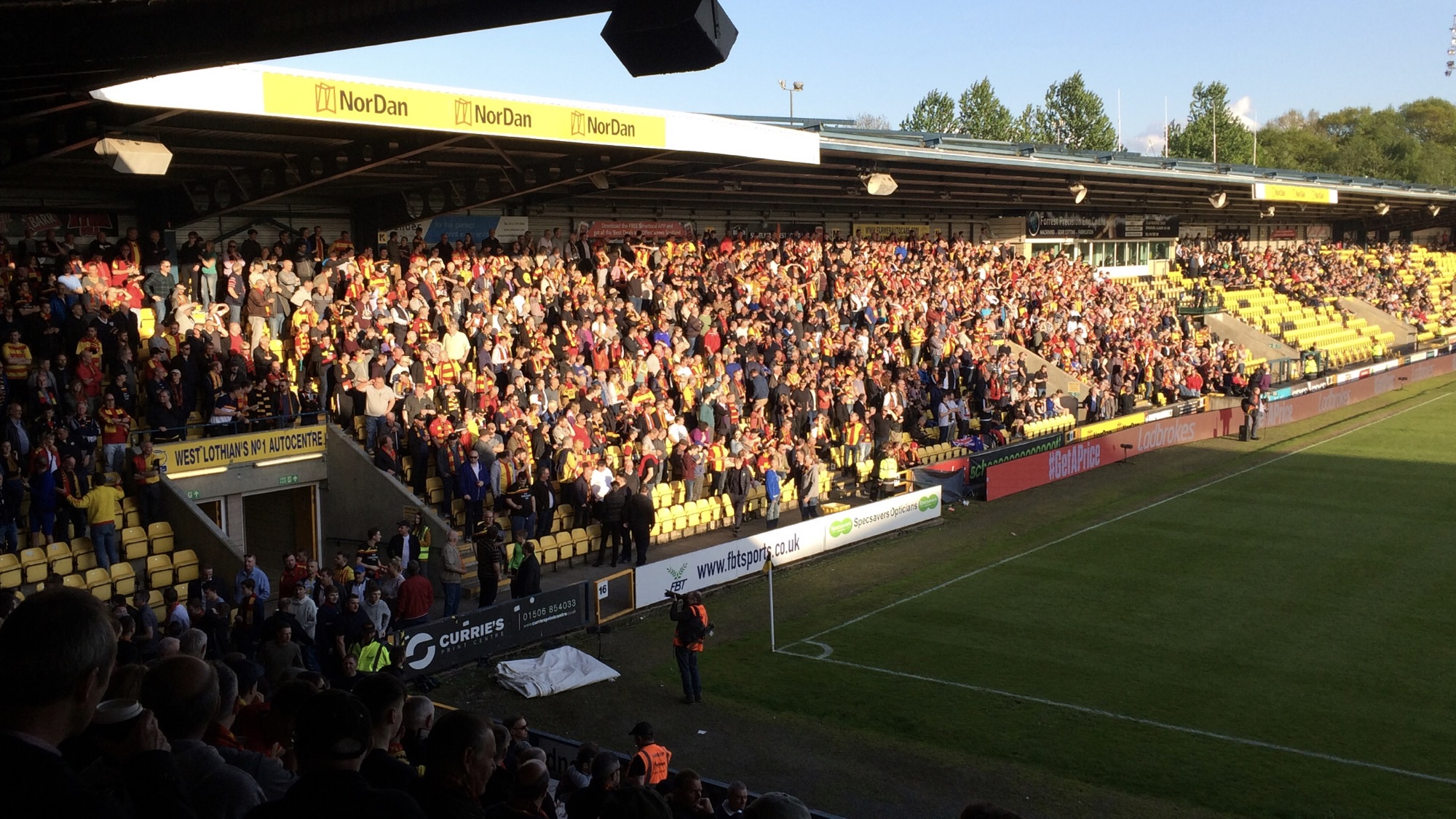
Thistle fans at Almondvale Stadium in May 2018.

The club has a relatively modest fanbase which is mostly centred around Northern Glasgow, although they do have pockets of fans from across the globe. Being in close proximity to a large student population the club attracts many new fans from the local universities.

The club prides itself on being non-sectarian and, therefore, not involved in the Old Firm division.

Since the 1980s, the club has a small hooligan firm called the North Glasgow Express.

=== Rivalries ===
Although the club competes with neighbours Rangers and Celtic, due to the vast differences in team size and fortunes those rivalries are not reciprocated. The "Glasgow derby" is therefore contested with Clyde, sometimes dubbed the "Old Firm alternative". One of the fiercest rivals were Airdrieonians with past violent clashes between fans including Airdrie's Section B group, however this rivalry has faded with time. Strong rivalries also previously existed with Clydebank due to the geographic proximity and controversial ownership in the past (with plans which almost saw both clubs bankrupt); and also Kilmarnock. The club has a more modern rivalry with Morton, which stemmed from the 2012–13 title race; Thistle won the First Division and Morton finished runners-up.

=== Chants and songs ===
Thistle fans sing songs during matches, some of which are relatively generic but others which are unique. Choruses of "He Wears Number 9", "Rellow Army", "Mary fae Maryhill", "Over Land and Sea", "Forever and Ever", "We've Followed the Thistle for Many a Day" (to the tune of "The Wild Rover"), "Oh Maryhill Is Wonderful", "We're a Well Known Glasgow Football Team", "Super Ian McCall", "We Score When We Want" and "Gerry Britton Is the King of Spain" are commonly heard in the singing section of the home support, in the John Lambie stand.

The song "Return to Firhill Road" recorded by the Lambie McParlands (Ian MacKinnon, Neil Donaldson and Ciaran Black) is a more recent addition to the match day songs.

=== Notable supporters ===
- American actor David Hasselhoff said he is a fan of the club, and likes the club's values. Mr Hasselhoff also met some of the team for a live TV interview.
- Maryhill-born actor Robert Carlyle (Trainspotting, The Full Monty and The 51st State) is also a famous supporter, stating he would rather watch the Jags than watch Arsenal or Manchester United.
- Craig Ferguson, former host of the popular American chat show The Late Late Show with Craig Ferguson.
- The historian Niall Ferguson was a supporter while growing up in Glasgow.
- Laura Kuenssberg, BBC Political editor.
- Hollyoaks actor Chris Fountain.
- Jack Revill, DJ from Glasgow better known as Jackmaster.
- Former tennis player Colin Fleming is a self proclaimed Jags fan, following in his family's footsteps as he attended games when he was younger and kept track of Thistle's results while on tour.
- Former Labour leader Jeremy Corbyn was pictured wearing a Partick Thistle scarf on a train and has mentioned the club in the past.

== Sponsors ==
The club's main sponsor is Just Employment Law, taking over from Kingsford Capital Management. MacB resumed sponsorship of Partick Thistle in the summer of 2012, and subsequently signed a two-year extension, keeping them as main sponsors until the end of the 2014–15 season. Scottish security system company Alarmfast also started sponsoring Thistle for the 2014–15 season.

Thistle's kit maker is Irish manufacturers O'Neills, having replaced Spanish company Joma at the start of the 2020–21 season.

Kit suppliers
Dates	Supplier
1977–1983	Umbro
1983–1984	Unbranded
1984–1989	Umbro
1989–1993	Spall Sports
1993–1994	Bukta
1994–1995	Matchwinner
1995–1997	Le Coq Sportif
1997–1999	Arrow
1999–2000	Rossco
2000–2002	Secca Sports
2002–2006	TFG Sports
2006–2008	Diadora
2008–2013	Puma
2013–2020	Joma
2020–	O'Neills

Shirt sponsors
Dates	Sponsor
1983–1986	Morton Rolls
1986–1987	Ashoka West End
1987–1989	Colonel Gee's Carpets
1989–1990	Watson Towers
1990–1996	Texstyle World
1996–1997	DLS
1997–1999	Auto Windscreens
1999–2007	D.H.Morris Group
2007–2008	Resolution Asset Management
2008–2011	Ignis Asset Management
2011–2012	MacB Water
2012	Just Employment Law
2012–2015	MacB Water
2015–2018	Kingsford Capital Management
2018–	Just Employment Law

== Mascot ==
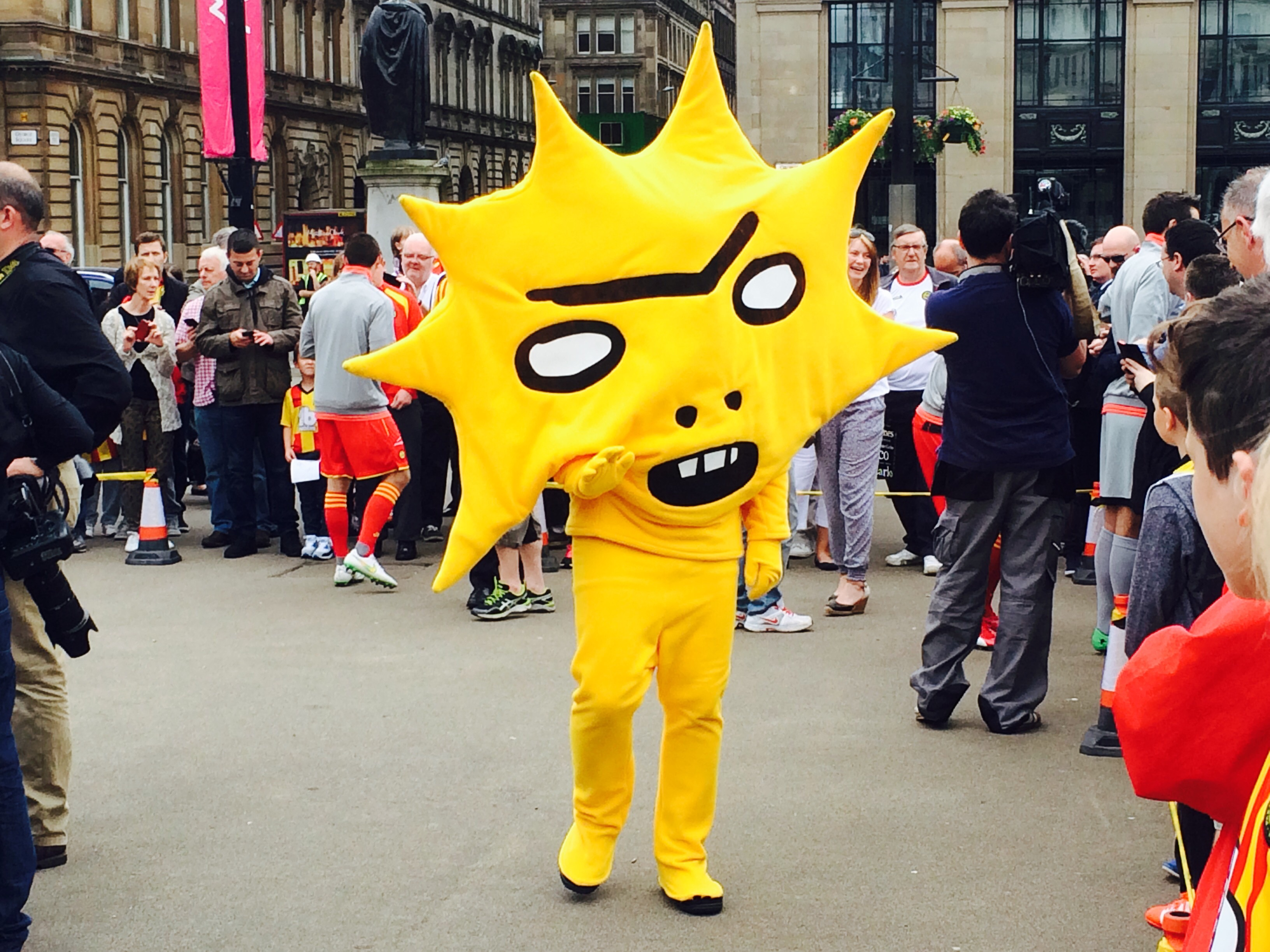
Kingsley at a media event in George Square, Glasgow

Partick Thistle's current mascot is a sun-shaped character named Kingsley, and was designed by the Turner Prize–nominated artist David Shrigley. Kingsley was unveiled on 22 June 2015 to coincide with Thistle's new sponsorship with California-based investment firm Kingsford Capital Management. Kingsley succeeded Jaggy MacBee, a bumble bee who had been the club's mascot from 2011 to 2015, as part of the club's sponsorship with Scottish beverage company MacB. Prior to that the mascot was a brightly coloured toucan called Pee Tee.

Kingsley gained widespread notoriety online, having trended worldwide on Twitter, as well as being publicised by major networks such as CNN, The Washington Post, and Time magazine. The launch, and subsequent pictures, appeared across the UK media including in The Daily Telegraph, The Times, BBC, Sky Sports, The Herald, and Talksport.

Partick Thistle's general manager Ian Maxwell hailed the success of Kingsley in drawing attention to the club, stating that the worldwide interest and TV coverage amounted to the "biggest amount of publicity from a sponsorship launch in Scottish football history". The Kingsley mascot has become a major source of merchandising potential for the club, with demand outstripping supply.

== Community trust ==
=== Partick Thistle Women ===
Thistle Weir Ladies Football Club was officially founded as part of the Thistle Weir Academy in 2014, having previously existed as part of the Charitable Trust for one year prior to that. In October 2018, the team gained promotion to the Scottish Women's Premier League 2 (SWPL 2), which is the second highest tier for women's football in Scotland. In January 2019, the club rebranded as Partick Thistle Women's Football Club.

The team train at the Firhill Complex in Maryhill, but play their matches at Petershill Park in Springburn.

=== Thistle Weir Youth Academy ===
In October 2013, millionaires and long time Thistle fans Chris and Colin Weir donated £750,000 to Partick Thistle to set up a new advanced youth academy. The academy was named the Thistle Weir Youth Academy. Graduates of the academy include James Penrice, Aidan Fitzpatrick, Jack Hendry and Kevin Nisbet.

== Current squad ==
=== First-team squad ===
As of 31 August 2026

Note: Flags indicate national team as defined under FIFA eligibility rules; some limited exceptions apply. Players may hold more than one non-FIFA nationality.

No.	Pos.	Nation	Player
1	GK	SCO	Lewis Budinauckas
2	DF	SCO	Cammy Logan
3	DF	SCO	Patrick Reading
5	DF	SCO	Lee Ashcroft (captain)
6	MF	ENG	Ben Dempsey
7	MF	ENG	Seb Drozd
8	MF	NIR	Oisin Smyth
9	FW	WAL	Alex Samuel
10	FW	SCO	Euan Henderson
11	MF	SCO	Gary Mackay-Steven
12	GK	SCO	Liam McFarlane (on loan from Hearts)
14	MF	SCO	Robbie Crawford

No.	Pos.	Nation	Player
17	DF	ENG	Ethan Ingram
20	DF	IRL	Dan O'Reilly
21	MF	SCO	Aidan Fitzpatrick
22	DF	CAN	Cale Loughrey
24	DF	SCO	Ben McPherson
26	MF	SCO	Ben Stanway
31	DF	SCO	Jamie Low
32	FW	SCO	Tony Watt
34	MF	SCO	Steven Docherty
35	MF	SCO	Josh Miller
64	MF	SCO	Ts'oanelo Lets'osa

=== On loan ===
Note: Flags indicate national team as defined under FIFA eligibility rules; some limited exceptions apply. Players may hold more than one non-FIFA nationality.

No.	Pos.	Nation	Player
18	FW	SCO	Ricco Diack (on loan at Ross County)
25	MF	SCO	Matthew Falconer (on loan at Kelty Hearts)
27	GK	SCO	Conor Storey (on loan at Arthurlie)
29	DF	SCO	Liam Rooney (on loan at Clyde)
30	DF	SCO	Liam Dolan (on loan at Albion Rovers)
33	FW	SCO	Daniel Gray (on loan at Kilwinning Rangers)
37	FW	SCO	Thomas Horn (on loan at Cumbernauld Colts)

No.	Pos.	Nation	Player
—	GK	NIR	Josh Clarke (on loan at Doncaster Rovers)
—	DF	SCO	Charlie Waddell (on loan at Rutherglen Glencairn)
—	MF	SCO	Kyle Murray (on loan at St Roch's)
—	MF	SCO	Ryan Paterson (on loan at St Roch's)
—	FW	SCO	Chris Mackay (on loan at Rutherglen Glencairn)
—	FW	ESP	Gabriel Nosa Erhabor (on loan at St Roch's)
—	FW	SCO	Flynn O'Brien (on loan at St Roch's)

== Club staff ==
As of October 2026

=== Boardroom ===
Name	Role
Dr Alan Robertson	Honorary vice president
Sandy Fyfe	Director
Alistair Gray	Director
Craig Liddell	Director
Caroline Mackie	Director
Donald McClymont	Director
Grant Russell	Director
Ian Baraclough	Sporting director
Graham McRoberts	Acting general manager
Lee Turnbull	Head of recruitment

=== Coaching and backroom staff ===
Name	Role
Mark Wilson	Head coach
Alex Rae	Assistant head coach
Kenny Arthur	Goalkeeping coach
Craig Dargo	Partick Thistle Youth Academy director
Gary Irvine	Head of professional phase
Richard Tran	Club doctor
Scott Anderson	Physiotherapist
Connor McGown	Sports scientist
Allan Findlay	Head groundsman
Paul McDonald	Kit manager
The Rev. Jonathan de Groot	Club chaplain

== Managers ==
Name	Years	Honours
George Easton	1903–1929	Scottish Cup (1920–21)
Donald Turner	1929–1947	
David Meiklejohn	1947–1959	3rd in the Scottish League (1947–48 & 1953–54)
Willie Thornton	1959–1968	3rd in the Scottish League (1962–63)
Scot Symon	1968–1970	
Davie McParland	1970–1974	League Cup (1971), Division Two (1970–71)
Bertie Auld	1974–1980	Division One (1975–76)
Peter Cormack	1980–1984	
Benny Rooney	1984–1986	
Bertie Auld	1986	
Derek Johnstone	1986–1987	
Billy Lamont	1987–1988	
John Lambie	1988–1989	
Sandy Clark	1989–1990	
John Lambie	1990–1995	Promotion to Premier Division (1991–92)
Murdo MacLeod	1995–1997	
John McVeigh	1997–1998	
Tommy Bryce	1998–1999	
John Lambie	1999–2003	First Division (2001–02), Second Division (2000–01)
Gerry Collins	2003	
Gerry Britton	2003–2005	
Derek Whyte	2003–2005	
Dick Campbell	2005–2007	First Division Playoffs (2005–06)
Ian McCall	2007–2011	
Jackie McNamara	2011–2013	
Alan Archibald	2013–2018	First Division (2012–13)
Gary Caldwell	2018–2019	
Ian McCall	2019–2023	League One (2020–21)
Kris Doolan	2023–2025	
Mark Wilson (head coach)	2025–	

== Individual achievements ==
=== Most appearances ===
Name	Apps	Career
Alan Rough	624	1969–1982
Davie McParland	587	1953–1974
Jackie Campbell	579	1963–1982
Willie Sharp	571	1939–1957
Jimmy McGowan	543	1941–1956
Eddie McLeod	495	1926–1940
Willie Bulloch	471	1909–1923
Alex Elliott	454	1927–1940
Stuart Bannigan	441	2010–2025
John Harvey	435	1951–1966
Alan Archibald	423	1997–2003, 2007–2013
Kris Doolan	401	2009–2019

=== All-time top goalscorers ===
Name	Goals	Career
Willie Sharp	229	1939–1957
Willie Paul	186	1884–1899
George Smith	125	1953–1964
Jimmy Walker	121	1946–1957
Kris Doolan	121	2009–2019
Johnny Torbet	116	1924–1933
Willie Newall	101	1938–1945
Dougie Somner	101	1974–1979
Brian Graham	100	2020–2025
Alex Hair	98	1923–1928
David Ness	97	1923–1935

== Honours ==
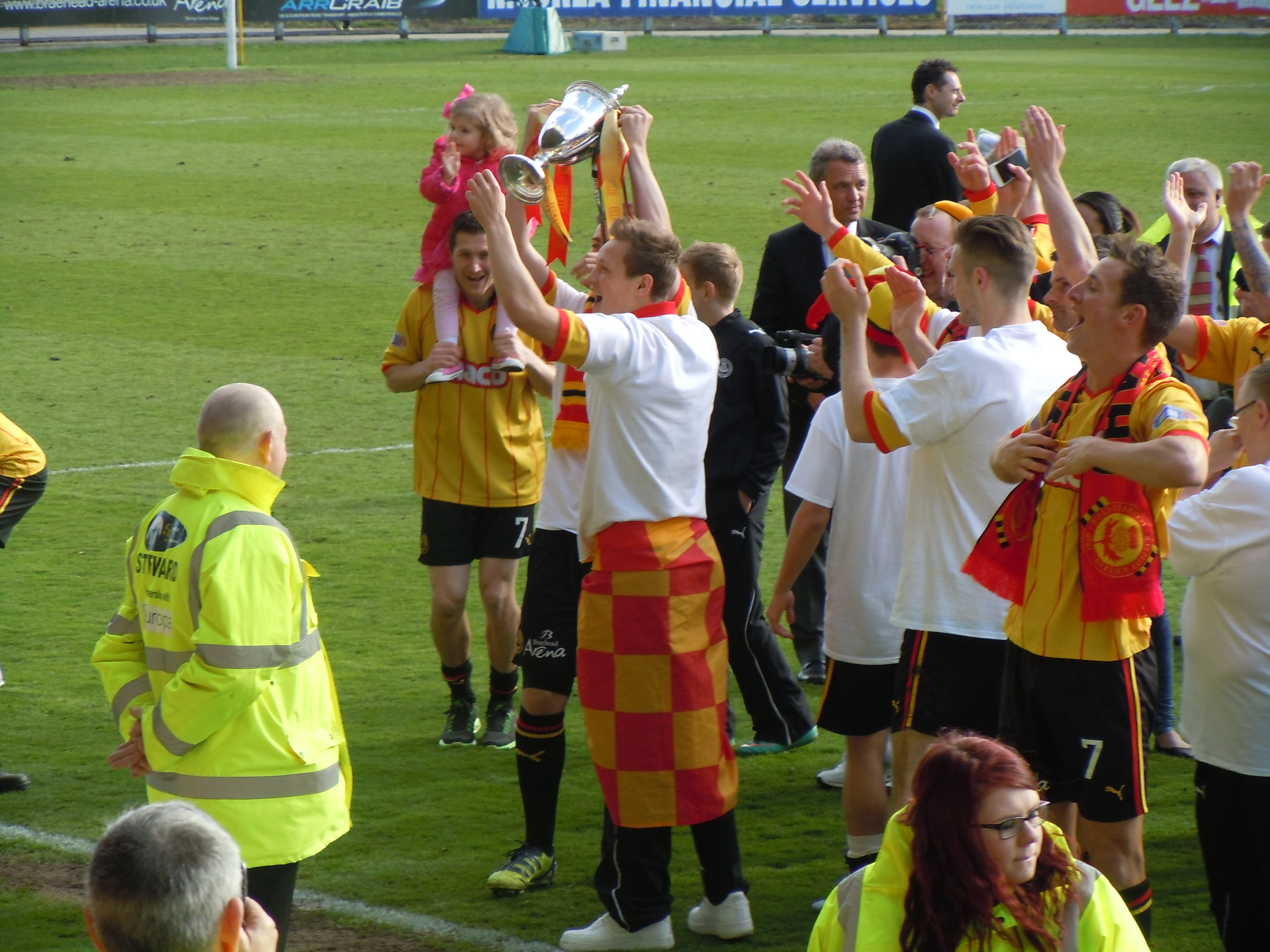
Thistle win the 2012–13 Scottish First Division.

=== Major ===
- Scottish Cup:
  - Winners (1): 1920–21
  - Runners-up (1): 1929–30
- Scottish League Cup:
  - Winners (1): 1971–72
  - Runners-up (3): 1953–54, 1956–57, 1958–59

=== Minor ===
- Scottish Championship / Scottish Football League First Division, second tier:
  - Winners (6): 1896–97, 1899–1900, 1970–71, 1975–76, 2001–02, 2012–13
  - Runners-up (4): 1901–02, 1991–92, 2008–09, 2025–26
- Scottish League One / Scottish Football League Second Division, third tier:
  - Winners (2): 2000–01, 2020–21
  - Play-off Winners: 2005–06
- Scottish Challenge Cup:
  - Runners-up: 2012–13

=== Other ===
- Glasgow Cup
  - Winners (7): 1934–35, 1950–51, 1952–53, 1954–55, 1960–61, 1980–81, 1988–89
  - Runners-up (11): 1888–89, 1900–01, 1911–12, 1914–15, 1917–18, 1919–20, 1932–33, 1936–37, 1959–60, 1966–67, 1968–69
- Glasgow Merchants Charity Cup
  - Winners (3): 1926–27, 1934–35, 1948–49
  - Runners-up (7): 1904–05, 1915–16, 1917–18, 1940–41, 1950–51, 1955–56, 1959–60
- Summer Cup: 1945
- Glasgow Dental Hospital Cup: 1928
- West of Scotland FA Cup: 1879
- Yoker Cup: 1881, 1882, 1883
- Partick Championship: 1884
- Greenock Charity Cup: 1893
- Paisley Charity Cup: 1936
- British Cup-Winners' Challenge: 1921
- Tennents' Sixes: 1993 (last winners)
- Coronation Cup: 1928, 1929
- ARR Craib Cup: 2012

== Club records ==
- Highest record home attendance: 49,838 vs Rangers, Scottish First Division, 18 February 1922
- Most league appearances: Alan Rough, 410
- Most league goals in a season: Alex Hair, 41, 1926–27
- Record defeat: 0–10 v Queen's Park, Scottish Cup, 3 December 1881
- Record victory: 16–0 v Royal Albert, Scottish Cup 1st round, 17 January 1931
- Record points total: 78, Scottish First Division, 2012–13
- Record transfer fee paid: £85,000 to Celtic for Andy Murdoch, February 1991
- Record transfer fee received: £350,000 from Barnsley for Liam Lindsay, June 2017 / £350,000 from Norwich City for Aidan Fitzpatrick, July 2019

== European record ==
Thistle have participated in European competition on three different occasions. On the first occasion, they qualified having finished third in the First Division. They progressed to the second round of the Fairs Cup before being eliminated by Spartak Brno. They qualified for the UEFA Cup in 1972–73 after winning the League Cup the previous season; Hungarian side Honvéd eliminated them in the first round. Their most recent European campaign was the 1995 UEFA Intertoto Cup, when they finished 4th with four points in Group 6.

Season	Competition	Round	Opponent	Home	Away	Aggregate
1963–64	Inter-Cities Fairs Cup	First round	(Northern Ireland) Glentoran	3–0	4–1	7–1
1963–64	Inter-Cities Fairs Cup	Second round	(Czechoslovakia) Spartak Brno	3–2	0–4	3–6
1972–73	UEFA Cup	First round	(Hungary) Budapest Honvéd	0–3	0–1	0–4
1995–96	UEFA Intertoto Cup	Group 6	(Austria) LASK	–	2–2	–
1995–96	UEFA Intertoto Cup	Group 6	(Iceland) Keflavík	3–1	–	–
1995–96	UEFA Intertoto Cup	Group 6	(France) Metz	–	0–1	–
1995–96	UEFA Intertoto Cup	Group 6	(Croatia) NK Zagreb	1–2	–	–
